= List of Italian films of 1945 =

A list of films produced in Italy in 1945 (see 1945 in film):

Title	Director	Cast	Genre	Notes
1945
07... Tassì	Alberto D'Aversa, Marcello Pagliero, Riccardo Freda	Vera Carmi, Tito Gobbi, Rosetta D'este	—	
L'abito nero da sposa	Luigi Zampa	Fosco Giachetti, Jacqueline Laurent	—	
Aldo dice 26x1				
Come Back to Sorrento	Carlo Ludovico Bragaglia	Gino Bechi, Adriana Benetti	Musical	
Down with Misery	Gennaro Righelli	Anna Magnani, Nino Besozzi	Comedy drama	
Fear No Evil	Giuseppe Maria Scotese	Fosco Giachetti, Adriana Benetti, Nino Pavese	Drama	
The Gates of Heaven	Vittorio De Sica	Marina Berti, Massimo Girotti	Drama	
The Innocent Casimiro	Carlo Campogalliani	Erminio Macario, Lea Padovani, Olinto Cristina	Comedy	
Life Begins Anew	Mario Mattoli	Alida Valli, Fosco Giachetti	Drama	
My Widow and I	Carlo Ludovico Bragaglia	Vittorio De Sica, Isa Miranda	Comedy	
No Turning Back	Alessandro Blasetti	Elisa Cegani, Doris Duranti, Valentina Cortese	Drama	
Non canto più	Riccardo Freda	Enzo Fiermonte, Vera Bergman, Paola Borboni	—	
Rome, Open City (Roma città aperta)	Roberto Rossellini	Anna Magnani, Aldo Fabrizi, Marcello Pagliero, Maria Michi, Giovanna Galletti	Italian neorealism	Palme d'Or winner, Academy Award nominee for Best Script, New York Film Critics Circle Awards, National Board of Review
Romulus and the Sabines	Mario Bonnard	Totò, Carlo Campanini	Comedy	
The Song of Life	Carmine Gallone	Alida Valli, Carlo Ninchi, María Mercader	Drama	
The Twentieth Duke	Lucio De Caro	Paola Veneroni, Roberto Villa, Paola Borboni	Comedy	
Tutta la città canta	Riccardo Freda	Nino Taranto, Vivi Gioi	Musical-comedy	
Two Anonymous Letters	Mario Camerini	Clara Calamai, Andrea Checchi	Drama	
What a Distinguished Family	Mario Bonnard	Gino Cervi, Assia Noris	Comedy	

== Bibliography ==
- Curti, Roberto (2017). Riccardo Freda: The Life and Works of a Born Filmmaker. McFarland. ISBN 978-1476628387.
