= There's Room Up Ahead =

1942 film

- Directed by: Mario Bonnard
- Written by: Aldo Fabrizi; Piero Tellini; Federico Fellini; Cesare Zavattini; Mario Bonnard
- Produced by: Giuseppe Amato
- Starring: Aldo Fabrizi; Andrea Checchi; Adriana Benetti; Virgilio Riento
- Cinematography: Vincenzo Seratrice
- Edited by: Maria Rosada
- Music by: Giulio Bonnard
- Production company: Società Italiana Cines
- Distributed by: ENIC
- Release date: 30 April 1942
- Running time: 90 minutes
- Country: Italy
- Language: Italian

There's Room Up Ahead (Italian: Avanti c'è posto...) is a 1942 Italian comedy film directed by Mario Bonnard and starring Aldo Fabrizi, Andrea Checchi and Adriana Benetti. It was made at Cinecittà in Rome.

== Plot ==
A young girl - Rosella - loses her wallet on a tram. Cesare, the conductor, is trying to help her after she's left without a dime and homeless. Soon he and his tram driver friend Bruno are competing for the attention of the girl.

== Cast ==
- Aldo Fabrizi as Cesare Montani
- Andrea Checchi as Bruno Bellini
- Adriana Benetti as Rosella
- Virgilio Riento as The Boss
- Carlo Micheluzzi as Angelo Pandolin
- Cesira Vianello as Cecilia Pandolin
- Jone Morino as The woman who vanished
- Pina Gallini as The misstres of Rosella
- Gioconda Stari as Teresa
- Arturo Bragaglia as Tullio
- Giulio Battiferri as Pietro, tram driver
- Giulio Calì as A passenger
- Wanda Capodaglio as Mrs. Camilla
- Olga Capri
- Giuseppe Ciabattini
- Enrico Luzi as A passenger
- Vinicio Sofia as The hotel porter
- Anna Maria Zuti

== Bibliography ==
- Moliterno, Gino. A to Z of Italian Cinema. Scarecrow Press, 2009.
- Reich, Jacqueline & Garofalo, Piero. Re-viewing Fascism: Italian Cinema, 1922-1943. Indiana University Press, 2002.
