= Aroldo Tieri =

Italian actor (1917–2006)

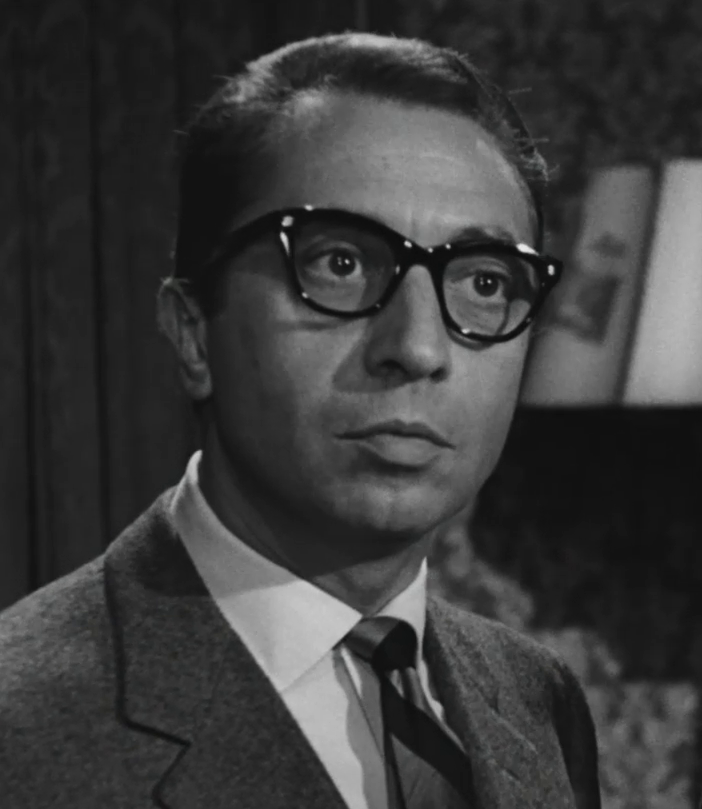
- Aroldo Tieri in the movie Chi si ferma è perduto (1960)
- Born: 28 August 1917; Corigliano Calabro, province of Cosenza, Kingdom of Italy
- Died: 28 December 2006 (aged 89); Rome, Italy
- Occupation: Actor
- Years active: 1939–1969

Aroldo Tieri (28 August 1917 – 28 December 2006) was an Italian actor. He appeared in more than 100 films between 1939 and 1969.

== Life and career ==
Born in Corigliano Calabro, province of Cosenza, son of the journalist and playwright Vincenzo Tieri, Aroldo Tieri moved in Rome at 18 to study law at university, and in the meanwhile approached acting and enrolled the Accademia Nazionale di Arte Drammatica Silvio D'Amico. Graduated in 1938, he almost immediately made his debut in theater and in film. Soon Tieri became one of the most popular and appreciated young actors, with a predisposition to the comic genre. In cinema Tieri specialized in roles on jealous, irascible, nervous boyfriends, and this characterization limited his career and caused his retirement from films in the late 1960s. His versatility was revealed especially on stage and on television, that at the end of the 1950s gave him notoriety with a successful adaptation of the Dickens' novel Nicholas Nickleby and then as host of Canzonissima in 1960. Companion for many years on the scene of the actress Giuliana Lojodice, later his wife, Tieri formed a stage company with her in 1965 and the couple was very active in multiple projects at theater, radio and TV.

== Selected filmography ==
- Mad Animals (1939)
- Manon Lescaut (1940) - Il segretario di De Brienne
- The Hussar Captain (1940)
- Sancta Maria (1942)
- Disturbance (1942) - Aurelio
- Document Z-3 (1942)
- Music on the Run (1943) - Piero - lo spasimante di Maria
- Il nostro prossimo (1943) - Il promesso sposo di Paola
- Redemption (1943) - Giuseppe Bongiovanni
- C'è sempre un ma! (1943) - Carletto
- Non sono superstizioso... ma! (1943) - Lo spasimante vevrastenico
- Il fidanzato di mia moglie (1943) - Enrico Paoletti
- Music on the Run (1943) - Luciano
- Chi l'ha visto? (1945)
- What a Distinguished Family (1945) - Duca Lothar Scintillati
- Come Back to Sorrento (1945) - L'altro Mario Bianchi
- The Voice of Love (1946) - Osvaldo
- Felicità perduta (1946) - Nicola
- Last Love (1947) - Il sergente d'aviazione
- When Love Calls (1947) - Pacini
- Crossroads of Passion (1948) - Franciolini
- Mad About Opera (1948) - Guido Marchi
- Toto Looks for a House (1949) - Checchino, il fidanzato
- I peggiori anni della nostra vita (1949) - Sacha
- Little Lady (1949) - Un ladro
- Sicilian Uprising (1949) - Folco
- Ho sognato il paradiso (1950) - Adriano
- Toto Looks for a Wife (1950) - Pippo, il pittore
- The Elusive Twelve (1950) - Il dottor Giechi
- Night Taxi (1950) - Conte Tattini
- The Transporter (1950) - Alberto
- Toto the Sheik (1950) - Il marchese Gastone
- 47 morto che parla (1950)
- Beauties on Bicycles (1951) - Aroldo - difanzato de Delia
- Song of Spring (1951) - Nino
- Milano miliardaria (1951) - Il marito geloso
- It's Love That's Ruining Me (1951) - Carlo
- Accidents to the Taxes!! (1951) - Il principe Oli
- Toto the Third Man (1951) - Anacleto - il sarto
- Auguri e figli maschi! (1951) - Ruggero
- Cameriera bella presenza offresi... (1951) - Luigino, il segretario di Leonardi
- Beauties in Capri (1952) - Zalasky
- The Reluctant Magician (1951) - Mago Trapani
- Amor non ho... però... però (1951) - Giuliano
- Il microfono è vostro (1951) - Filippo
- Tizio, Caio, Sempronio (1951) - Sempronio
- Mademoiselle Gobete (1952) - Luciano Pinglet, il giudice istruttore
- Toto and the King of Rome (1952) - Ferruccio
- I morti non pagano tasse (1952) - Nicola, Il locandiere
- Il tallone di Achille (1952) - Pazzo della Reincarnazione
- Cavalcade of Song (1953) - L'innamorato della dattilografa
- Matrimonial Agency (1953) - Mario
- Sins of Casanova (1955) - José
- Noi siamo le colonne (1956) - Archimede
- Un angelo è sceso a Brooklyn (1957) - Bruno
- The Adventures of Nicholas Nickleby (1958, TV Series) - Wackford Squeers
- Toto, Peppino and the Fanatics (1958) - The Psychiatric Medical Director
- Gli zitelloni (1958) - Suo marito
- Tuppe tuppe, Marescià! (1958) - Angiolino Angelucci
- Non perdiamo la testa (1959) - Ispettore di Scotland Yard
- Ciao, ciao bambina! (1959) - Il conduttore dei vagoni letto
- Le cameriere (1959) - Il ragioniere
- Le confident de ces dames (1959) - Le journaliste
- La cambiale (1959) - Commendator Pierluigi Bruscatelli
- Juke box urli d'amore (1959) - Anzillotto, the accountant
- Il raccomandato di ferro (1959) - The head clerk
- I baccanali di Tiberio (1960) - Lacone
- Messalina (1960) - Pirgo Pollinice
- Letto a tre piazze (1960) - Avv. Vacchi
- Chi si ferma è perduto (1960) - Matteo Rossi (II)
- Un dollaro di fifa (1960) - Mayor
- Le ambiziose (1961) - Goffredo Innamorati - un produttore
- The Joy of Living (1961) - 2. Anarchist
- Vacanze alla baia d'argento (1961) - Aroldo
- Che femmina!! E... che dollari! (1961)
- Cacciatori di dote (1961) - Alfonso Martini
- Mina... fuori la guardia (1961) - Renato Pacchioni
- Dreams Die at Dawn (1961) - Antonio
- No Man's Land (1962) - Tassoni
- Colpo gobbo all'italiana (1962) as Titillo (lit. 'The Tickler')
- Lo smemorato di Collegno (1962) - Dott. ALessandro Zannini
- I motorizzati (1962) - Dino
- Terrible Sheriff (1962) - Fats Missouri
- Gli eroi del doppio gioco (1962) - Primo Rossi
- Avventura al motel (1963) - Giorgio
- The Shortest Day (1963) - Tenente Farsardi (uncredited)
- La donna degli altri è sempre più bella (1963) - Marcello Mancini (segment "La luna di miele")
- I magnifici tre (1963) - Bonarios
- The Swindlers (1963) - Mr. Taverna (segment "Società calcistica, La")
- Gli onorevoli (1963) - Saverio Fallopponi
- La ballata dei mariti (1963) - Armando Tirreni
- I due mafiosi (1964) - Commissario Dupont
- Two Thousand Maniacs! (1964) - Mr. Bonfanti (segment "La cambiale") / Mario (segment "La protesta")
- Two Mafiamen in the Far West (1964) - Ramirez
- Le sette vipere (Il marito latino) (1964) - Barbikian
- Oh! Those Most Secret Agents! (1964) - Dr. Nicola Cirillo
- Salome '73 (1965)
- Two Sergeants of General Custer (1965) - Specialista
- Con rispetto parlando (1965)
- La vedovella (1965) - Ambrogino
- Non son degno di te (1965) - RCA Manager
- Se non avessi più te (1965) - Neris
- Questo pazzo, pazzo mondo della canzone (1965)
- Spiaggia libera (1966) - Mario
- La feldmarescialla (1967) - Maj. Kurt von Baum
- Soldati e capelloni (1967) - Sergente Alberto Caputo
