= Come Back to Sorrento (1945 film) =

1945 film

- Directed by: Carlo Ludovico Bragaglia
- Written by: Aldo De Benedetti
- Starring: Gino Bechi; Adriana Benetti; Aroldo Tieri
- Cinematography: Mario Albertelli; Giuseppe La Torre
- Edited by: Alma Del Pezzo
- Music by: Cesare A. Bixio; Felice Montagnini
- Production company: Manenti Film
- Distributed by: Nazionalcine
- Release date: November 1945
- Running time: 95 minutes
- Country: Italy
- Language: Italian

Come Back to Sorrento (Italian: Torna... a Sorrento) is a 1945 Italian musical comedy film directed by Carlo Ludovico Bragaglia and starring Gino Bechi, Adriana Benetti and Aroldo Tieri. It takes its name from a popular song.

The film's sets were designed by Alberto Boccianti.

== Cast ==
- Gino Bechi as Mario Bianchi
- Adriana Benetti as Paola
- Aroldo Tieri as Il fidenzato di Paola
- Guglielmo Barnabò as Il padre di Paola
- Marcella Rovena as La madre di Paola
- Camillo Pilotto
- Arturo Bragaglia
- Loris Gizzi
- Marcello Giorda

== Bibliography ==
- Orio Caldiron. Il Paradosso Dell'autore. Bulzoni, 1999.
