= Four Steps in the Clouds =

1942 film

- Theatrical release poster
- Directed by: Alessandro Blasetti
- Written by: Giuseppe Amato; Alessandro Blasetti; Aldo De Benedetti; Piero Tellini; Cesare Zavattini
- Produced by: Giuseppe Amato
- Starring: Gino Cervi; Adriana Benetti
- Cinematography: Václav Vích
- Music by: Alessandro Cicognini
- Production company: Società Italiana Cines
- Distributed by: ENIC
- Release date: 23 December 1942
- Running time: 95 minutes
- Country: Italy
- Language: Italian

Four Steps in the Clouds (Italian: Quattro passi fra le nuvole) is a 1942 Italian comedy-drama film directed and co-written by Alessandro Blasetti, starring Gino Cervi and Adriana Benetti. It tells the story of a married man who agrees to act as the husband of a young pregnant woman who has been abandoned by her boyfriend. Aesthetically, it is close to Italian neorealism. It was shot at Cinecittà Studios in Rome. The film's sets were designed by Virgilio Marchi.

In 2008, the film was included on the Italian Ministry of Cultural Heritage’s 100 Italian films to be saved, a list of 100 films that "have changed the collective memory of the country between 1942 and 1978."

It was nominated for BAFTA as Best Film from any Source. It was also responsible for popularizing English-language dubbing in Europe thanks to the dubbed version overseen by Gisella Matthews. The movie was remade several times, including The Virtuous Bigamist in 1956 and as A Walk in the Clouds in 1995.

== Plot ==
The story deals with Paolo Bianchi, a married agent for a candy manufacturer, played by Gino Cervi. He leads a stable, if somewhat boring, family life in a large unnamed city in the North of Italy.

While travelling on a South-bound train on company business, he sees a young woman, Maria, about to be put off by the conductor. She has no ticket and cannot afford to buy one. Bianchi helps Maria stay on the train, and she asks if he could do her one more favour. Maria has just been abandoned by her boyfriend upon becoming pregnant and she is now on her way back to the family farm. She has nowhere else to go but is certain that her father will throw her out as soon as he realizes that Maria is unmarried.

She is terrified and begs Bianchi to come home with her and pass himself off as her husband. The deception needs only last a couple of days, after which he can go back to his normal life and job and Maria can claim to have been abandoned. Bianchi decides that taking a couple of days off work is a small price to pay for saving Maria's honour for the rest of her life and gets off the train with her.

Arriving on the farm, Bianchi finds it hard to maintain the lie, but in an impassioned speech, convinces Maria's father to let her stay at home. After which, he goes back to his wife and family without mentioning the incident.

== Cast ==
- Gino Cervi as Paolo Bianchi
- Adriana Benetti as Maria
- Giuditta Rissone as Clara Bianchi
- Carlo Romano as Antonio, l'autista della corriera
- Guido Celano as Pasquale – Fratello di Maria
- Margherita Seglin as Luisa, madre di Maria e Pasquale
- Aldo Silvani as Luca, padre di Maria e Pasquale
- Mario Siletti as Il fattorino della corriera
- Oreste Bilancia as Il droghiere di Campolo
- Gildo Bocci as Il contadino sulla corriera
- Arturo Bragaglia as Il viaggiatore nervoso
- Anna Carena as La maestra sulla corriera
- Pina Gallini as Signora Clelia
- Luciano Manara as Il settentrionale
- Armando Migliari as Antonio, il capostazione

== Release ==
The film premiered in Italy on 23 December 1942. It was released in the United States on 20 November 1948.

== Reception ==
The New York Times wrote in 1948: "Although the Italian film artisans have been garnering justifiable acclaim here for the biting realism of their topical portraits, kudos has not been the rule where other themes were concerned. So it is pleasant to report that Four Steps in the Clouds rates a round of applause for its sensitive treatment of a thoroughly unspectacular subject." The critic described Cervi's performance as "a beautifully wrought characterization" and Benetti's as "finely etched" and "poignant". Concerning the storyline, the critic wrote that "the improbability is outweighed by the performances of the cast and adeptness of direction, which makes Four Steps in the Clouds both believable and diverting."

Jacek Klinowski and Adam Garbicz covered the film in their 2012 book Feature Cinema in the 20th Century, where they assessed it as a break from the "banal" cinema of Blasetti's preceding period, and a return to a style he had employed ten years before, which they described as "innovative". Klinowski and Garbicz acknowledged that Four Steps in the Clouds, and Blasetti in general, had been important in the development of the Italian neorealist movement, but came up with several reservations about the film, and wrote how they would have preferred if the neorealists to a greater extent had been inspired by Luchino Visconti's Ossessione instead of Blasetti's films. The critics wrote about Four Steps in the Clouds:

Especially the first part of Blasetti's comedy, which takes place in a crowded bus, comes across (despite its unrefined observations) as a striking novelty and a veritable photograph of life. But the fact remains that the director seems to have been carried away by his enthusiasm, although Four Steps in the Clouds is certainly a film of quality. Its second lyrical-nostalgic part is not weaker that the first, although with its popular-generic tone it shows only the surface of events and reduces feelings to simple opposites: dislike and friendship, obstinacy and tolerance, despair and joy.

== Remakes ==
The film was remade as The Virtuous Bigamist in 1956, as A Walk in the Clouds in 1995, as Mungarina Minchu in 1997, as Pooveli in 1998, as Alludugaaru Vachcharu in 1999 and as Dhai Akshar Prem Ke in 2000.
