= The Prisoner of Santa Cruz =

- Directed by: Carlo Ludovico Bragaglia
- Written by: Sergio Amidei; Piero Ballerini; Giacomo De Benedetti; Guido Paolucci
- Starring: Juan de Landa; María Mercader; Giuseppe Rinaldi
- Cinematography: Rodolfo Lombardi
- Edited by: Ines Donarelli
- Music by: Giulio Bonnard
- Production company: Lux Film
- Distributed by: Lux Film
- Release date: 2 March 1941
- Running time: 78 minutes
- Country: Italy
- Language: Italian

The Prisoner of Santa Cruz (Italian: Il prigioniero di Santa Cruz) is a 1941 Italian drama film directed by Carlo Ludovico Bragaglia and starring Juan de Landa, María Mercader, and Giuseppe Rinaldi.

It was shot at Cinecittà Studios in Rome. The film's sets were designed by the art directors Ivo Battelli and Gino Brosio.

== Cast ==
- Juan de Landa as Pietro
- María Mercader as Carmela
- Giuseppe Rinaldi as Paolo Costa
- Carmen Navasqués as Estellita
- Enrico Glori as Luigi Bolli
- Amelia Chellini as Concetta
- Cesare Polacco as Sandro, suo marito
- Giulio Donadio as Michele Galdera
- Guglielmo Sinaz as Salvatore
- Luis Gonzales as Simone Costa
- Mariù Gleck as Zia Rosa
- Arturo Bragaglia as L'impiegato dell'agenzia marittima
- Amalia Pellegrini as Maria
- Lora Silvani as Ines
- Ugo Sasso as Il marinaio della "Manuela"
- Aristide Garbini as Rodriguez
- Emilio Petacci as Il medico
- Giulio Battiferri as Il capitano Leroux
- Carlo Mariotti as Il capitano Riva
- Marisa Malvi as Un' amica di Carmela

== Bibliography ==
- Roberto Chiti & Roberto Poppi. I film: Tutti i film italiani dal 1930 al 1944. Gremese Editore, 2005.
