= Song of Spring (1951 film) =

1951 Italian film by Mario Costa

- Directed by: Mario Costa
- Written by: Mario Costa; Fulvio Palmieri; Paolo Salviucci
- Produced by: Matteo Jankolovicz
- Starring: Leonardo Cortese; Delia Scala; Tamara Lees
- Cinematography: Mario Bava
- Edited by: Otello Colangeli
- Music by: Carlo Innocenzi
- Production company: Zeus Film
- Distributed by: Zeus Film
- Release date: 13 March 1951
- Running time: 89 minutes
- Country: Italy
- Language: Italian

Song of Spring (Italian: Canzone di primavera) is a 1951 Italian melodrama film directed by Mario Costa and starring Leonardo Cortese, Delia Scala and Tamara Lees. The film's sets were designed by the art director Alberto Boccianti.

== Partial cast ==
- Leonardo Cortese as Mario
- Delia Scala as Rosetta
- Tamara Lees as Evi
- Claudio Villa as himself
- Laura Gore as Maria
- Aroldo Tieri as Nino
- Ludmilla Dudarova as Elena
- Checco Durante as Pippo
- Dante Maggio as Gigetto
- Paola Borboni as Lidia
- Arturo Bragaglia
- Piero Lulli as Ugo
- Enrico Glori
- Franco Pesce
- Jone Morino as Fanny
- Felice Romano
- Giuseppe Pierozzi
- Aldo Silvani
- Vittorio Sanipoli as Max

== Bibliography ==
- Pasquale Sorrenti. Il cinema e la Puglia. Schena, 1984.
