= The Virtuous Bigamist =

- Directed by: Mario Soldati
- Cinematography: Nicolas Hayer
- Music by: Paul Miraski
- Release date: 1956
- Language: Italian

The Virtuous Bigamist (French: Sous le ciel de Provence, Italian: Era di venerdì 17) is a 1956 French-Italian comedy drama film directed by Mario Soldati. It is a remake of the Italian film Four Steps in the Clouds, and like the original is co-written by Alessandro Blasetti. The other co-writers are Giuseppe Amato, Aldo De Benedetti, Piero Tellini and Cesare Zavattini.

== Cast ==
- Fernandel as Paul Verier
- Giulia Rubini as Maria
- Fosco Giachetti as Antonio
- Leda Gloria as Lucia
- Renato Salvatori as Gino
- Andrex as Frederic
- Tina Pica as Zia Camilla
- Alberto Sordi as Mario
- Suzet Maïs as Juliette Verdier
- Jean Brochard as the car salesman
