= A Walk in the Clouds =

- Theatrical release poster
- Directed by: Alfonso Arau
- Screenplay by: Robert Mark Kamen; Mark Miller; Harvey Weitzman
- Based on: Four Steps in the Clouds by Piero Tellini; Cesare Zavattini; Vittorio de Benedetti
- Produced by: Gil Netter; David Zucker; Jerry Zucker
- Starring: Keanu Reeves; Aitana Sánchez-Gijón; Anthony Quinn; Giancarlo Giannini
- Cinematography: Emmanuel Lubezki
- Edited by: Don Zimmerman
- Music by: Maurice Jarre
- Production company: Zucker Brothers Productions
- Distributed by: 20th Century Fox
- Release dates: May 27, 1995 (Japan); August 11, 1995 (U.S.)
- Running time: 102 minutes
- Countries: United States; Mexico
- Language: English
- Budget: $20 million
- Box office: $91 million

A Walk in the Clouds is a 1995 period romantic drama film directed by Alfonso Arau and starring Keanu Reeves, Aitana Sánchez-Gijón, Giancarlo Giannini, Angélica Aragón, Evangelina Elizondo, Debra Messing and Anthony Quinn. An international co-production film between the United States and Mexico, it was an English-language remake of the 1942 Italian film Four Steps in the Clouds.

A Walk in the Clouds was released in theaters on August 11, 1995, by 20th Century Fox. It received mixed reviews from critics, but it was a commercial success, grossing $91 million against a $20 million budget. Maurice Jarre's musical score earned him a Golden Globe Award for Best Original Score.

== Plot ==
In 1945, after World War II, United States Army Sgt. Paul Sutton, a former candy salesman, returns to San Francisco to reunite with his wife, Betty, whom he married following a whirlwind courtship the day before he departed for the Pacific. The war has left him with emotional scars, and he experiences flashbacks on a regular basis.

Paul's reunion with Betty is strained, especially after he discovers that, although he has written her “almost every day,” she stopped reading his letters after the first few and keeps the hundreds of unopened envelopes in a footlocker. He is determined to make a go of the marriage, however, and hopes to establish a new career for himself. She insists he continue to sell chocolates door-to-door, and he sets off to Sacramento. En route, he meets fellow train passenger Victoria Aragon, a graduate student whose Mexican American family owns a vineyard in the Napa Valley. When Victoria is accosted by two men on their bus to Sacramento, Paul intervenes and eventually beats up the men in self-defense. After the three men are kicked off the bus as a result, Paul finds a crying Victoria alone, further down the road. When he learns she is pregnant by her professor, Paul offers to introduce himself to her very traditionalist family as her husband.

Victoria's father, Alberto, is infuriated, not only that she married a man below her social standing, but without his permission as well. Paul's initial plan to quietly slip away and continue on his journey, leaving her family to believe he abandoned her, is derailed when her grandfather, Don Pedro, encourages him to stay and help with the harvest. During the harvest, Paul (an orphan) grows closer to the family and learns the joys that come with their tradition, roots, and way of life. He and Victoria try to ignore their growing attraction and feelings for each other, but with little success. After a couple of days together, she finds the courage to ultimately come clean and reveal the truth to her family, further angering her father.

Paul's honor prompts him to attempt to salvage his marriage and return home, but when he does, he discovers Betty has long been having an affair with another man. She has applied for an annulment, to which he happily agrees, and returns to the Aragon estate to ask Victoria to marry him.

When Paul returns, an argument with an angry and drunk Alberto leads to a disastrous fire which destroys the vineyard. However, Paul remembers one plant that may still have its roots intact, races off to retrieve it, and carries it to the family. The disaster, as well as Paul's bravery and dedication during it, has led to Alberto realizing his errors, and accepting Paul as one of his own, saying the roots of the plant are now officially Paul's “roots.” Victoria and Paul are married in the presence of the entire Aragon family, and all set out to replant and rebuild with the help of their newest member.

== Cast ==
- Keanu Reeves as Sgt. Paul Sutton
- Aitana Sánchez-Gijón as Victoria Aragon
- Anthony Quinn as Don Pedro Aragon
- Giancarlo Giannini as Alberto Aragon
- Angélica Aragón as Maria Jose Aragon
- Evangelina Elizondo as Guadalupe Aragon
- Freddy Rodriguez as Pedro "Peter" Aragon, Jr.
- Debra Messing as Betty Sutton
- Febronio Covarrubias as Jose Manuel
- Roberto Huerta as Jose Luis
- Juan Jiménez as Jose Marie
- Alejandra Flores as Consuelo
- Gema Sandoval as Maria
- Don Amendolia as Father Coturri
- Gregory Martin as Armistead Knox
- Mary Pat Gleason as Bus Driver
- John Dennis Johnston as Lout #1
- Macon McCalman as Conductor

== Production ==
=== Screenplay ===
The screenplay for the film was written by Robert Mark Kamen, Mark Miller, and Harvey Weitzman. It was based on the 1942 Italian film Four Steps in the Clouds, written by Piero Tellini, Cesare Zavattini, and Vittorio de Benedetti. The film had a budget of $20 million.

=== Filming ===
Principal photography took place on location among the wineries of Napa Valley and in the towns of Napa, St. Helena, and Sonoma. The Napa wineries included Mayacamas Vineyards and Mount Veeder Winery. The St. Helena wineries included Beringer Vineyards, the Redwood Cellar of the Charles Krug Winery, and the Duckhorn Vineyards. In Sonoma, the Haywood Vineyards was also used.

Additional filming outside the Napa Valley region took place in San Pedro, the harbor to the south of Los Angeles. The wine festival scene was actually staged in the Large Courtyard of Pasadena City Hall in Pasadena, east of Los Angeles.

- Alverno High School, 200 North Michillinda Avenue, Sierra Madre, California, USA
- Beringer Vineyards, 2000 Main Street, St. Helena, Napa Valley, California, USA
- City Hall, 100 N. Garfield Avenue, Pasadena, California, USA
- Duckhorn Vineyards, 1000 Lodi Lane, St. Helena, Napa Valley, California, USA
- Haywood Vineyards, 18000 Old Winery Road, Sonoma, California, USA
- Mayacamas Vineyards, 1155 Lokoya Road, Napa, Napa Valley, California, USA
- Mount Veeder Winery, 1999 Mount Veeder Road, Napa, Napa Valley, California, USA
- Redwood Cellar, Charles Krug Winery, 2800 Main Street, St. Helena, Napa Valley, California, USA
- San Pedro, Los Angeles, California, USA

=== Soundtrack ===
The film score was written by Maurice Jarre, but included four songs by other composers:

- "Crush the Grapes" (Alfonso Arau and Leo Brouwer) performed by Roberto Huerta, Juan Jiménez, Febronio Covarrubias, and Ismael Gallegos
- "Beer Barrel Polka" (Wladimir A. Timm, Jaromir Vejvoda, and Lew Brown)
- "Canción mixteca" (José López Alavés) performed by Ismael Gallegos
- "Mariachi's Serenade" (Alfonso Arau and Leo Brouwer) performed by Roberto Huerta, Juan Jiménez, Febronio Covarrubias, and Ismael Gallegos

== Release and critical reception ==
=== Box office ===
The film grossed $50,008,143 in the United States and Canada and $91 million worldwide.

=== Critical reception ===
Roger Ebert of the Chicago Sun-Times gave the film four out of four stars, his highest rating, writing:

A Walk in the Clouds is a glorious romantic fantasy, aflame with passion and bittersweet longing. One needs perhaps to have a little of these qualities in one's soul to respond fully to the film, which to a jaundiced eye might look like overworked melodrama, but that to me sang with innocence and trust...At a time when movies seem obligated to be cynical, when it is easier to snicker than to sigh, what a relief this film is!

Mick LaSalle of the San Francisco Chronicle wrote:

A couple of turns of plot—including the histrionic ending—seem less magical than overwrought, but A Walk in the Clouds is for the most part a beautiful, well-acted and emotionally rich picture...In this very warm-hearted film, Reeves' face is the movie's focus of kindness and decency—and he stands up to scrutiny. There's not just sweetness there but depth.

On the other hand, Hal Hinson of The Washington Post called it "a phenomenally atrocious movie—so bad, in fact, that you might actually manage to squeeze a few laughs out of it...The film has the syrupy, Kodak magic-moment look of a Bo Derek movie, and pretty much the same level of substance."

Variety described the film as "a glossy, fairy-tale romance that's longer on wishfulness than believability" and "a modest but sharply-mounted comedy/melodrama."

As of January 2022, A Walk in the Clouds holds a rating of 46% on Rotten Tomatoes from 28 reviews with the consensus: "A Walk in the Clouds aims for sweeping period romance, but quickly unravels thanks to a miscast leading man and a story that relies on cheap melodrama."

=== Awards and nominations ===
Maurice Jarre won the Golden Globe Award for Best Original Score. Conversely, Reeves's performance in the film earned him a Golden Raspberry Award nomination for Worst Actor (also for Johnny Mnemonic), but lost to Pauly Shore for Jury Duty.

=== Sexual harassment allegation ===
Debra Messing later claimed she was tricked into signing a nudity waiver after being assured by the producers that no nudity scenes would be required because it was going to be a PG-13 movie. She only learned on set that for the international release version those scenes nevertheless would be filmed. Asking director Alfonso Arau about what angles would be shot since she wanted to be prepared, he told her that as an actress she had no right to ask about his shots and it was her job to get naked. Messing described this experience as sexual harassment which she only realized afterward since she thought it was part of the business at the time. Arau dismissed the claim, saying it had "nothing to do with reality."

Messing also said that Arau belittled her for her appearance and body. Arau later denied the allegation. Messing reinforced these claims during an episode of the PBS documentary Finding Your Roots which aired in February 2025.

== Cultural reference ==
The 1997 Indonesian television series Melangkah Di Atas Awan contains a literal translation of the film's title.
