= Gildo Bocci =

Italian actor (1886–1964)

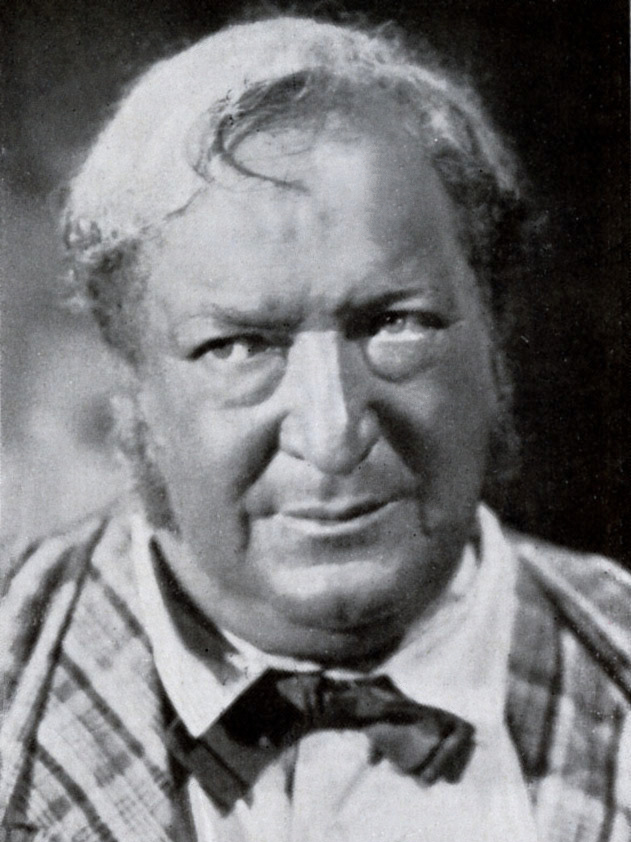
- Born: 1 September 1886; Rome, Italy
- Died: 22 July 1964 (aged 77); Rome, Italy
- Occupation: Actor
- Years active: 1913–1959

Gildo Bocci (1 September 1886 – 22 July 1964) was an Italian film actor. He appeared in 60 films between 1913 and 1959. He was born and died in Rome, Italy.

== Partial filmography ==
- Messalina (1924) - Apollonio
- Quo Vadis (1924) - Vittelius
- The Last Days of Pompeii (1926) - Diomede
- Da Icaro a de Pinedo (1927)
- Boccaccesca (1928)
- The Storyteller of Venice (1929)
- Maratona (1929) - Giovanne, Il Massaggiatore
- Everybody's Woman (1934) - Il regista
- L'avvocato difensore (1935) - Angelo
- Ho perduto mio marito (1939)
- Dora Nelson (1940) - Pasquale, il tassista
- Arditi civili (1940) - Il vigile del fuoco a riposo Checco Focone
- Validità giorni dieci (1940) - Il cuoco dell'albergo Mondiale
- The Palace on the River (1940) - Un terzo barbone
- Antonio Meucci (1940)
- La donna perduta (1940) - Galileo
- Captain Fracasse (1940) - Il capitano delle guardie
- L'uomo del romanzo (1940) - Il fattore
- Marco Visconti (1941) - Il taverniere
- The Mask of Cesare Borgia (1941) - Ramiro d'Orca
- Scampolo (1941) - Il fioraio
- Confessione (1941)
- The King's Jester (1941) - Il Gran Visir
- The Jester's Supper (1942) - Il taverniere
- Cat People (1942) - Il sergente Mack
- Street of the Five Moons (1942) - Federico, padre di Ines
- Sleeping Beauty (1942) - Un mercante
- Rossini (1942) - Il duca di Sforza-Cesarini
- After Casanova's Fashion (1942) - Pacchialone
- The Black Panther (1942) - Il sergente Mack
- Four Steps in the Clouds (1942) - Il contadino sulla corriera
- Music on the Run (1943) - Il vagabondo
- The White Angel (1943) - Domenico, il mugnaio
- The Valley of the Devil (1943) - Il postiglione
- Life Is Beautiful (1943) - Il fattore
- Non mi muovo! (1943) - Il portiere della casa vecchia
- Tutta la vita in ventiquattr'ore (1943) - Cesare, il padre di Giulio
- Zazà (1944) - Malardot, l'impresario teatrale
- The Gates of Heaven (1945)
- L'invasore (1949) - Custode di Villa Valfreda
- 47 morto che parla (1950) - Il macellaio
- Sambo (1950)
- Seven Hours of Trouble (1951) - L'ubriaco
- O.K. Nero! (1951)
- I'm the Hero (1952) - Proprietario carrettino gelati
- The Secret of Three Points (1952) - Mercante
- Il romanzo della mia vita (1952) - The Trattoria Owner
- La figlia del diavolo (1952) - Il signor Fratta
- Una donna prega (1953)
- Roman Holiday (1953) - Flower Seller (uncredited)
- Easy Years (1953)
- Noi cannibali (1953)
- Gran varietà (1954) - direttore del cinematografo (segment: 'Il fine dicitore')
- Days of Love (1954) - Il maresciallo
- Queen of Babylon (1954)
- Are We Men or Corporals? (1955)
- La ladra (1955) - Lo Professore
- Uncle Hyacynth (1955) - Dueño de la relojería
- The Band of Honest Men (1956) - Tabaccaio (uncredited)
- Due sosia in allegria (1956)
- Time of Vacation (1956) - Zio Santino
- Poor, But Handsome (1957) - Father of Romolo
- Pretty But Poor (1957) - Sor Nerone Toccacieli
- Onore e sangue (1957) - Giannone Ferretti - the usurer
- Tuppe tuppe, Marescià! (1958) - Bar Customer
- Conspiracy of the Borgias (1959)
- Poor Millionaires (1959)
