= The Employee =

1959 film

- Directed by: Gianni Puccini
- Produced by: Tonino Cervi; Alessandro Jacovoni
- Starring: Nino Manfredi
- Cinematography: Carlo Di Palma
- Edited by: Nino Baragli
- Music by: Piero Piccioni
- Release date: 1959
- Running time: 95 minutes
- Country: Italy
- Language: Italian

The Employee (Italian: L'impiegato) is a 1959 Italian comedy film directed by Gianni Puccini. The film is loosely inspired by The Secret Life of Walter Mitty.

== Cast ==
- Nino Manfredi as Nando
- Eleonora Rossi Drago as Inspector Jacobetti
- Anna Maria Ferrero as Joan
- Gianrico Tedeschi as Director
- Andrea Checchi as Francesco
- Anna Campori as Lisetta
- Sergio Fantoni as Sergio Jacobetti
- Gianni Bonagura as Pipetto
- Arturo Bragaglia as Nando's Father
- Pietro De Vico as McNally
- Cesare Polacco as Inspector Rock
- Franco Giacobini as Rotondi
- Polidor
- Enrico Glori
- Ignazio Leone
- Gianni Minervini as a gangster
