= Non ti pago! =

1942 film

- Film poster
- Directed by: Carlo Ludovico Bragaglia
- Written by: Carlo Ludovico Bragaglia; Eduardo De Filippo (play)
- Starring: Eduardo De Filippo
- Cinematography: Rodolfo Lombardi
- Edited by: Gabriele Varriale
- Release date: 7 October 1942
- Running time: 72 minutes
- Country: Italy
- Language: Italian

Non ti pago! [lit. I am not paying you!] is a 1942 Italian comedy film directed by Carlo Ludovico Bragaglia, who also wrote the screenplay after a theater play of the same name (Non ti pago (play), without "!", written in 1940) by Eduardo De Filippo, who is also the star of the film. It was shown as part of a retrospective on Italian comedy film at the 67th Venice International Film Festival.

== Cast ==
- Eduardo De Filippo - Don Ferdinando Quagliolo
- Titina De Filippo - Concetta Quagliolo
- Peppino De Filippo - Procopio Bertolini
- Vanna Vanni - Stella Quagliolo
- Paolo Stoppa - The attorney Lorenzo Strumillo
- Giorgio De Rege - Aglitiello
- Vasco Creti - Don Raffaele, the priest
- Italia Marchesini - Zia Erminia
- Ernesto Bianchi -One of the Cingallegra brothers
- Aristide Garbini - The man who is robbed
- Lina Marengo - Employee of the lottery bank
- Dolores Palumbo - Carmela
- Rosita Pisano - Lottery player 1
- Margherita Pisano - Lottery player 2

== Reception ==
"The paradoxical story is made psychologically plausible by the skill of the protagonists who have been able to infuse their character with a character of immediacy and spontaneity. Good direction and excellent distribution of the supporting characters.", wrote the Segnalazioni cinematografiche in 1942.
