= Dante Maggio =

Italian actor

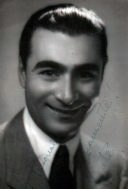
- Born: 2 March 1909; Naples, Kingdom of Italy
- Died: 3 March 1992 (aged 83); Rome, Italy
- Occupation: Actor
- Years active: 1940–1975

Dante Maggio (2 March 1909 – 3 March 1992) was an Italian film actor. He appeared in 115 films between 1940 and 1975.

Born in Naples into a family of actors, Maggio had a turbulent adolescence that led his father to send him in an institute for problematic minors. He debuted on stage aged 18 years old. He worked on stage in several sceneggiate and with the companies of Anna Fougez and Raffaele Viviani before creating his own revue company.

Maggio was the brother of actors Enzo, Rosalia, Beniamino and Pupella Maggio.

== Selected filmography ==
- The Palace on the River (1940)
- Un giorno nella vita (1946) - Carlo
- The Ways of Sin (1946) - La guardia carceraria (uncredited)
- The Great Dawn (1947)
- Last Love (1947) - Il partner di Maria
- Tombolo, paradiso nero (1947) - Agostino
- Le avventure di Pinocchio (1947) - Il Gendarme
- The Street Has Many Dreams (1948) - Emilio
- I contrabbandieri del mare (1948) - Paolino
- Il cavaliere misterioso (1948) - Gennaro, il servo di Casanova
- Guarany (1948) - Rossi
- The Firemen of Viggiù (1949) - Fireman from Naples
- The Wolf of the Sila (1949) - Gennaro
- Se fossi deputato (1949)
- Napoli eterna canzone (1949) - Giulio
- Botta e risposta (1950)
- Cavalcade of Heroes (1950) - Ciccillo
- No Peace Under the Olive Tree (1950) - Salvatore Capuano
- Side Street Story (1950) - Il rosticciere
- Father's Dilemma (1950) - Metropolitano che regola il trafico
- His Last Twelve Hours (1950) - Il calzolaio
- Feathers in the Wind (1950) - Gennaro
- 47 morto che parla (1950) - Dante Cartoni, il partener de la canzonettista
- Variety Lights (1951) - Remo
- Beauties on Bicycles (1951) - Altro ladro
- Song of Spring (1951) - Gigetto
- Milano miliardaria (1951) - Peppino Avallone
- Trieste mia! (1951)
- Repentance (1952)
- Viva il cinema! (1952) - Ciccillo
- Tragic Return (1952) - Nicola
- The City Stands Trial (1952) - Armando Capezzuto
- In Olden Days (1952) - un testimone
- We're Dancing on the Rainbow (1952) - Gennaro
- Final Pardon (1952)
- Don Lorenzo (1952) - Beniamino
- Delitto al luna park (1952)
- Perdonami! (1953) - Michele
- Siamo ricchi e poveri (1953)
- Lasciateci in pace (1953)
- La pattuglia dell'Amba Alagi (1953) - Ciccillo
- Casta Diva (1954) - Il pazzariello
- The Captain of Venice (1954) - Papele Scaramuzza
- La città canora (1954) - Pasquale
- Il grande addio (1954)
- Napoli piange e ride (1954) - Ciccillo
- Goodbye Naples (1955) - Pasquale
- Il cantante misterioso (1955) - Gennaro
- Toto in Hell (1955) - Pacifico
- Carovana di canzoni (1955) - Lord Mister
- La rossa (1955) - Maggiolino - il barbiere
- The Song of the Heart (1955) - Carletto, il giardiniere
- Scapricciatiello (1955) - Gennarino - Barber
- Songs of Italy (1955)
- Incatenata dal destino (1956) - Chitarrista
- Canzone proibita (1956) - Dante
- Occhi senza luce (1956) - Dante
- Mamma sconosciuta (1956) - Dante
- Cantando sotto le stelle (1956)
- Arriva la zia d'America (1956) - Dante
- Sette canzoni per sette sorelle (1957) - Don Ciccillo
- La canzone del destino (1957)
- C'è un sentiero nel cielo (1957) - Gennaro Percuoco
- The Lady Doctor (1957) - Un cameriere
- La zia d'America va a sciare (1957) - Dante
- Buongiorno primo amore! (1957) - Zio Gaetano
- Non sono più Guaglione (1958) - Don Pasqualino - Vincenzino's employer
- Quando gli angeli piangono (1958)
- Captain Falcon (1958) - Civetta
- Sorrisi e canzoni (1958) - Gennarino
- Mia nonna poliziotto (1958) - Padre di Ileana
- Ferdinando I° re di Napoli (1959)
- David and Goliath (1960) - Cret
- Pesci d'oro e bikini d'argento (1961)
- Boccaccio '70 (1962) - Foreman (segment "Le tentazioni del dottor Antonio") (uncredited)
- Toto and Peppino Divided in Berlin (1962) - Un magliaro
- Twist, lolite e vitelloni (1962) - Leone Remigi
- Rififi in Tokyo (1963)
- Siamo tutti pomicioni (1963) - Napoli - the host in the nightclub (segment "Pomicioni di provincia")
- The Visit (1964) - Cadek
- Bullet in the Flesh (1964) - Cliente bar
- Tears on Your Face (1964)
- Saul e David (1964) - Abdon
- La vendetta dei gladiatori (1964) - Ubriaco nella taverna
- For a Few Dollars More (1965) - carpenter in cell with El Indio
- Gold Train (1965) - Billy - telegrapher
- 3 colpi di Winchester per Ringo (1966) - Walcom Partner
- Un gangster venuto da Brooklyn (1966)
- Treasure Island (1966-1967, TV Mini-Series) - Bill Bones
- Treasure of San Gennaro (1966) - A Captain
- Ballad of a Gunman (1967) - Explosion / Esplotion / 'Knallfrosch'
- Wanted Johnny Texas (1967) - Sam More
- Operation St. Peter's (1967) - The Captain
- Comandamenti per un gangster (1968) - Old Man
- Caprice Italian Style (1968) - (segment "Mostro della domenica, Il")
- Anzio (1968) - Neapolitan street hawker (uncredited)
- May God Forgive You... But I Won't (1968) - Joe - Bartender
- Run, Man, Run (1968) - Mateos Gonzalez
- I 2 pompieri (1968) - Megatone
- Italiani! È severamente proibito servirsi della toilette durante le fermate (1969)
- A Sword for Brando (1970)
- Pray to Kill and Return Alive (1971) - Jonathan
- Black Killer (1971) - Judge Wilson
- Holy Water Joe (1971) - The Banker
- My Dear Killer (1972) - Mattia Guardapelle
- Trinità e Sartana figli di... (1972) - Bud Benny Bud
- Man Called Amen (1972) - Professor
- Alleluja & Sartana are Sons... Sons of God (1972) - The General
- Holy God, Here Comes the Passatore! (1973) - Prelato derubato
- Sentivano uno strano, eccitante, pericoloso puzzo di dollari (1973)
- Ci risiamo, vero Provvidenza? (1973) - Judge
- The Five Days (1973) - Old man in jail (uncredited)
- Oremus, Alleluia e Così Sia (1973)
- The Fighting Fist of Shanghai Joe (1973) - Doctor
- Long Lasting Days (1973) - 'Uncle' Giuseppe
- Di Tresette ce n'è uno, tutti gli altri son nessuno (1974) - Drakeman
