= Aldo Silvani =

Italian actor (1891–1964)

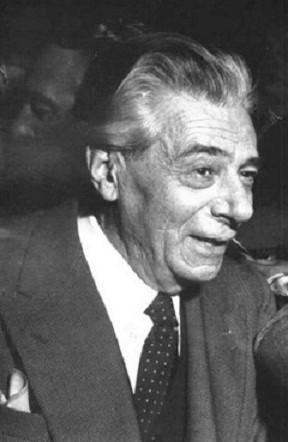
- Silvani in 1960
- Born: 21 January 1891; Turin, Kingdom of Italy
- Died: 11 December 1964 (aged 73); Milan, Italy
- Occupation: Actor
- Years active: 1934–1964

Aldo Silvani (21 January 1891 – 12 November 1964) was an Italian stage, film and voice actor. He appeared in more than 110 films between 1934 and 1964.

== Selected filmography ==
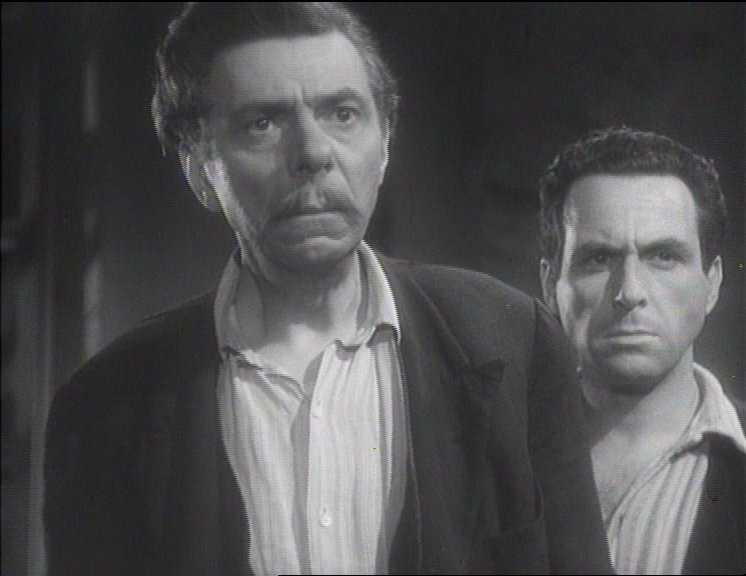
Aldo Silvani, left, and Guido Celano in the film Four Steps in the Clouds (1942)

- Cardinal Lambertini (1934)
- The Ancestor (1936)
- The Three Wishes (1937)
- The King of England Will Not Pay (1941)
- Carmela (1942)
- The Jester's Supper (1942)
- The Two Orphans (1942)
- Four Steps in the Clouds (1942)
- Lively Teresa (1943)
- Anything for a Song (1943)
- Calafuria (1943)
- Maria Malibran (1943)
- The Son of the Red Corsair (1943)
- Romulus and the Sabines (1945)
- L'abito nero da sposa (1945)
- The Ten Commandments (1945)
- Life Begins Anew (1945)
- The Ways of Sin (1946)
- The Courier of the King (1947)
- To Live in Peace (1947)
- The Captain's Daughter (1947)
- Difficult Years (1948)
- Mad About Opera (1948)
- Little Lady (1949)
- A Night of Fame (1949)
- Sicilian Uprising (1949)
- Chains (1949)
- The Dynamite Brothers (1949) - Narrator
- Paolo e Francesca (1950)
- L' Amore di Norma (1950)
- The Merry Widower (1950)
- Song of Spring (1951)
- Tomorrow Is Another Day (1951)
- The Mad Marechiaro (1952)
- Noi peccatori (1953)
- La pattuglia dell'Amba Alagi (1953)
- For You I Have Sinned (1953)
- Beat the Devil (1953) as Charles, restaurant owner
- Casta Diva (1954)
- On Trial (1954)
- The Lovers of Manon Lescaut (1954)
- Storm (1954)
- La Strada (1954)
- House of Ricordi (1954)
- Desperate Farewell (1955)
- Rigoletto e la sua tragedia (1956)
- Nights of Cabiria (1957)
- Ben Hur (1959) as Man in Nazareth (uncredited)
- Carthage in Flames (1960)
- Damon and Pythias (1962)
