= Tomb of the Angels =

1937 film

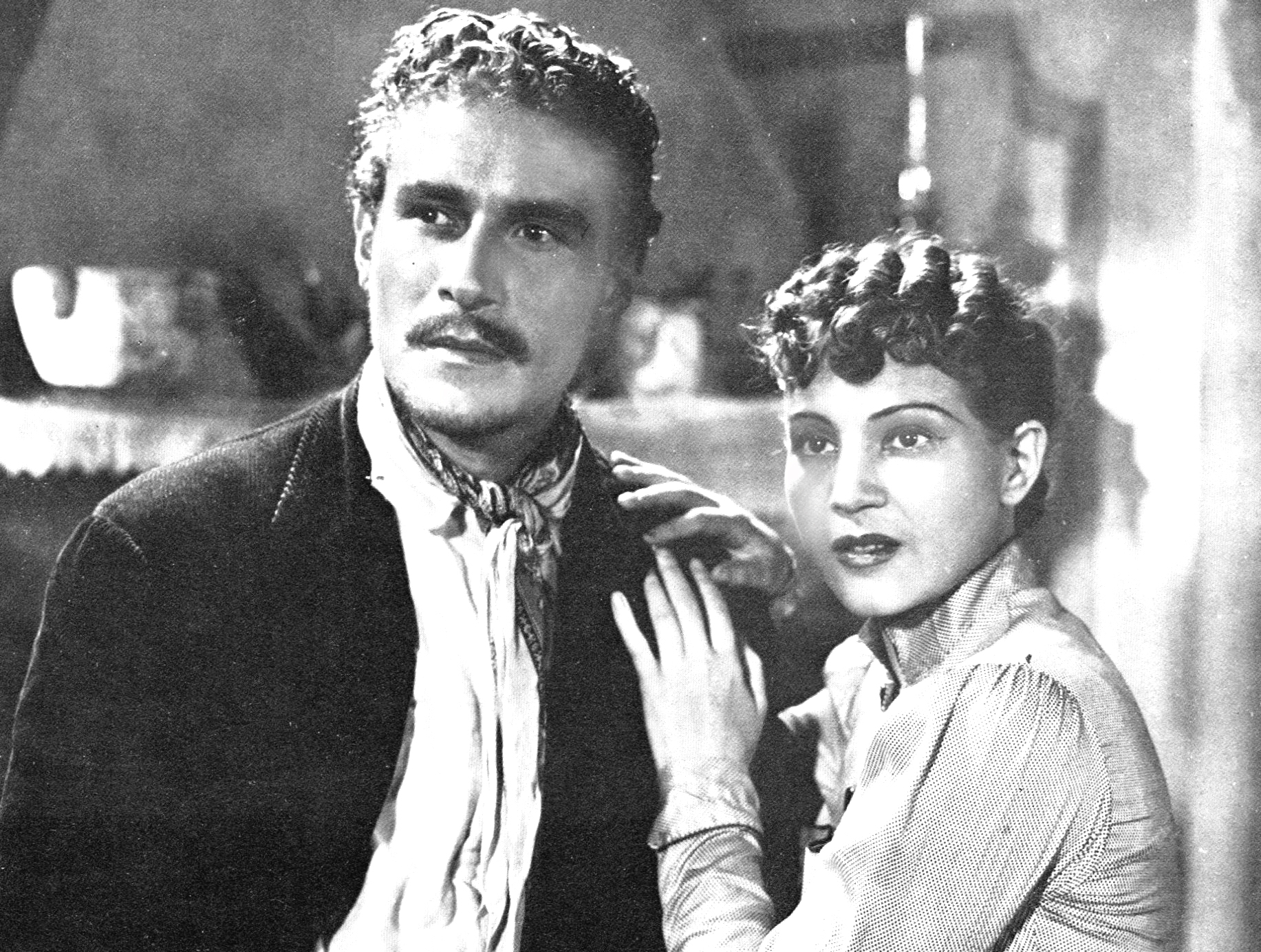
- Directed by: Carlo Ludovico Bragaglia
- Written by: Curt Alexander; Carlo Ludovico Bragaglia; Cesare Ludovici; Roberto Rossellini
- Produced by: Francesco Salvi
- Starring: Amedeo Nazzari; Luisa Ferida; Antonio Gradoli
- Cinematography: Mario Albertelli
- Edited by: Ferdinando Maria Poggioli
- Music by: Enzo Masetti
- Production company: Diorama Film
- Distributed by: Lux Film
- Release date: 1937
- Running time: 84 minutes
- Country: Italy
- Language: Italian

Tomb of the Angels (Italian: La fossa degli angeli) is a 1937 Italian drama film directed by Carlo Ludovico Bragaglia and starring Amedeo Nazzari, Luisa Ferida, and Antonio Gradoli. Roberto Rossellini co-wrote the screenplay and served as assistant director. It was shot on location in the Apuan Alps in Liguria, and is set amidst the marble quarries of the area. It marked an early attempt at realism in Italian cinema, anticipating neorealism of the postwar era. It is similar in style to Walter Ruttmann's Steel of 1933, in it celebrated Italy's industrial strength in line with the propaganda of the Mussolini regime.

== Cast ==
- Amedeo Nazzari as Pietro
- Luisa Ferida as Luisa
- Antonio Gradoli as Domenico
- Annette Ciarli as La madre di Luisa
- Vinicio Sofia as Angiolino
- Leo Chiostri

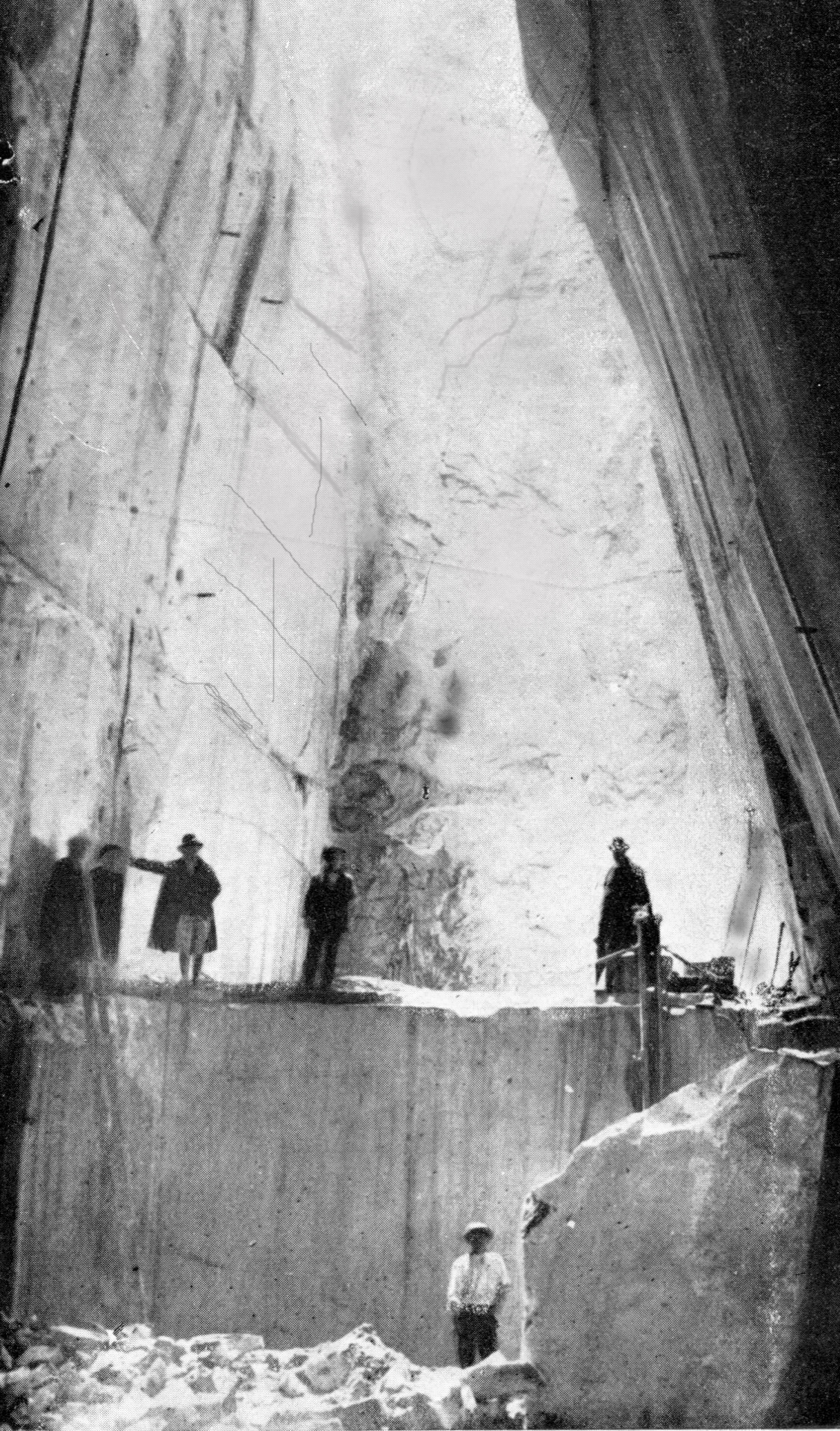

== Bibliography ==
- Brunetta, Gian Piero. The History of Italian Cinema: A Guide to Italian Film from Its Origins to the Twenty-first Century. Princeton University Press, 2009.
