= Rigoletto (1956 film) =

1956 film

- Directed by: Flavio Calzavara
- Written by: Flavio Calzavara; Jacopo Corsi; Paola Ojetti
- Produced by: Francesco Granata-Vigo
- Starring: Aldo Silvani; Gérard Landry; Loris Gizzi
- Cinematography: Bitto Albertini
- Edited by: Otello Colangeli
- Music by: Giuseppe Verdi
- Production company: Diva Film
- Distributed by: Felix Film
- Release date: 1956
- Running time: 91 minutes
- Country: Italy
- Language: Italian

Rigoletto or Rigoletto and His Tragedy (Italian: Rigoletto e la sua tragedia) is a 1956 Italian musical melodrama film written and directed by Flavio Calzavara and starring Aldo Silvani and Gerard Landry. It is based on the 1851 Giuseppe Verdi opera Rigoletto and incorporated music from that work.

The film's sets were designed by the art director Franco Lolli.

== Cast ==
- Aldo Silvani as Rigoletto
- Janet Vidor as Gilda
- Gérard Landry as Duke of Mantua
- Loris Gizzi as Count of Ceprano
- Cesare Polacco as Sparafucile
- Franca Tamantini as Maddalena
- Gualtiero Tumiati as Count of Monterone
- Nietta Zocchi as Giovanna
- Vittorio Vaser as Marullo
- Renato Chiantoni as The Poet
- Mario Terribile as Borsa
