= Salome '73 =

- Directed by: Odoardo Fiory
- Release date: 1965
- Country: Italy
- Language: Italian

Salome '73 is a 1965 Italian comedy film.

== Cast ==
- Aroldo Tieri
- Olimpia Cavalli
- Beverly Garland
- Jane De Clerc
