= Life Is Beautiful (1943 film) =

1943 film

- Directed by: Carlo Ludovico Bragaglia
- Written by: Carlo Ludovico Bragaglia; Aldo De Benedetti
- Produced by: Valentino Brosio
- Starring: Alberto Rabagliati; María Mercader; Anna Magnani
- Cinematography: Rodolfo Lombardi
- Edited by: Ines Donarelli
- Music by: Gino Filippini
- Production companies: Fono Roma; Lux Film
- Distributed by: Lux Film
- Release date: 26 May 1943
- Running time: 76 minutes
- Country: Italy
- Language: Italian

Life Is Beautiful (Italian: La vita è bella) is a 1943 Italian comedy film directed by Carlo Ludovico Bragaglia and starring Alberto Rabagliati, María Mercader and Anna Magnani. It was shot at the Palatino Studios in Rome. The film's sets were designed by the art director Gastone Medin.

== Synopsis ==
A count, broke through his addiction to gambling and suicidal, is offered a deal by a professor. He can have as much money for ten days as he likes as long as he agrees to act at the end of them as the subject of a new experimental drug which might have dangerous side effects. However, during these ten days the count undergoes a transformation of his worldview after falling in with a vagabond and staying in the countryside with two sisters.

== Cast ==
- Alberto Rabagliati as Il conte Alberto Morandi
- María Mercader as Nadina
- Anna Magnani as Virginia
- Carlo Campanini as Leone
- Gualtiero Tumiati as Il professore Luca Lecedius
- Virgilio Riento as Matteo Boccaloni
- Gildo Bocci as Il fattore
- Arturo Bragaglia as Il commissario
- Armando Furlai as L'assistente di Lucedius

== Bibliography ==
- Bonsaver, Guido. America in Italian Culture: The Rise of a New Model of Modernity, 1861-1943. Oxford University Press, 2024.
- Hochkofler, Matilde. Anna Magnani. Gremese Editore, 2001.
- Whittaker, Tom & Wright, Sarah (ed.) Locating the Voice in Film: Critical Approaches and Global Practices. Oxford University Press, 2017.
