= Cesare Polacco =

Italian actor (1900–1086)

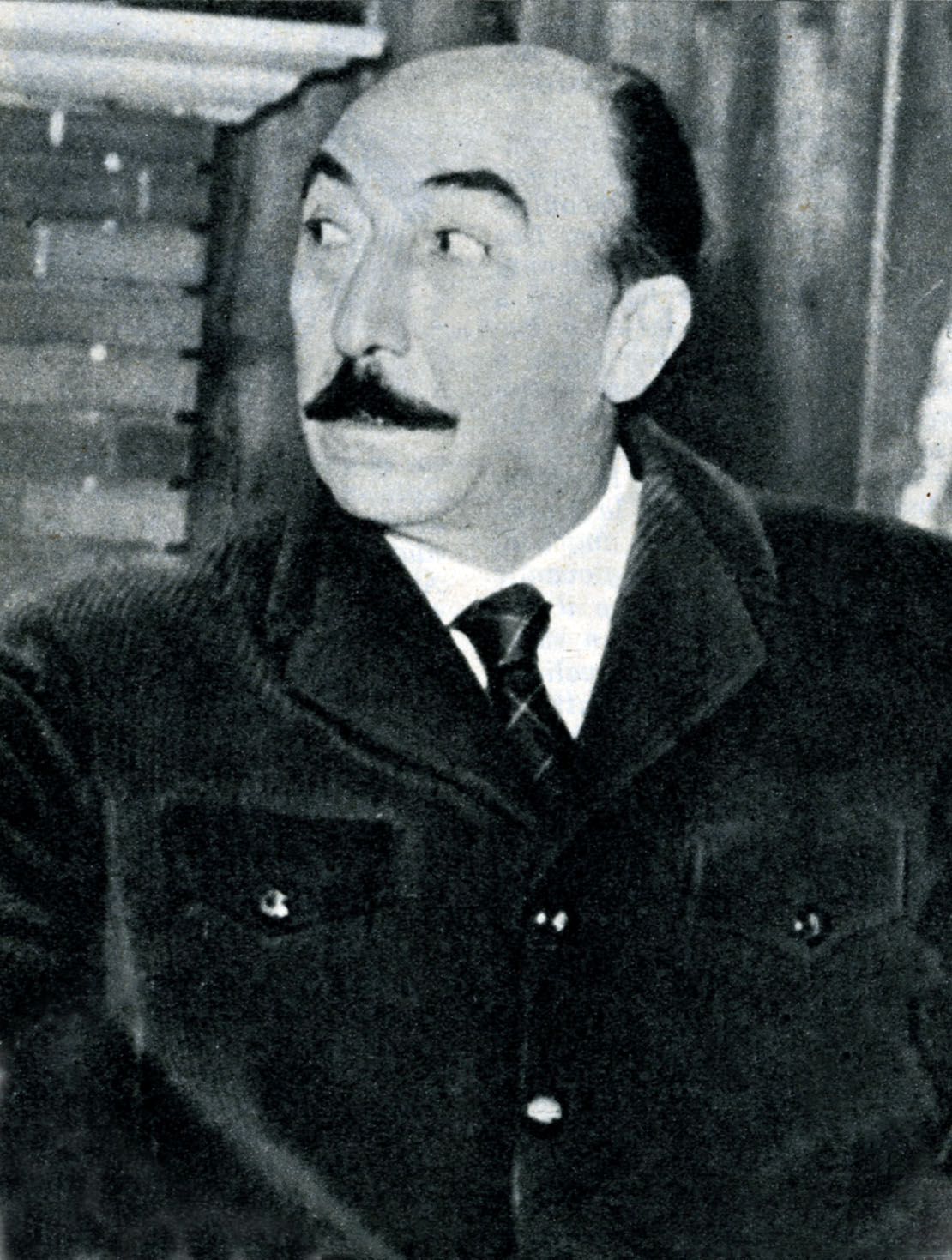
- Polacco in 1956
- Born: 14 May 1900; Venice, Italy
- Died: 2 March 1986 (aged 85); Rome, Italy
- Occupations: Actor; voice actor
- Years active: 1928–1986
- Spouse(s): Eugenia Zorn (died 1940) Clelia Bernacchi (m. 1947)
- Children: 3

Cesare Polacco (14 May 1900 – 2 March 1986) was an Italian actor and voice actor.

== Biography ==
Born in Venice, Polacco started his career in 1920 in the stage company of Emilio Zago, with whom he played most of the Goldoni's repertoire. In 1928 he moved to Rome, where in addition to theatre he started appearing in films and working as a dubber. Being of Jewish origin, he was temporarily forced to abandon acting because of the 1938 Fascist racial laws, resuming his activities at the end of the war, in 1945. Also active on radio and television, he got a large popularity thanks to the Inspector Rock character he played in Carosello, in a series of giallo-comedy shorts aired between 1957 and 1968.

Polacco was also a voice actor, having dubbed a number of actors which include Ward Bond, Anthony Quinn, Chill Wills, Howard da Silva, Louis Calhern, Richard Boone and Boris Karloff in several of their films. In his animated roles, he provided the Italian voice of Happy in Snow White and the Seven Dwarfs as well as one of the crows in Dumbo.

=== Personal life ===
Polacco was married to the actress Eugenia Zorn until her death in 1940. They had three daughters; Elena, Arduina and Marina. In 1947, he married the actress Clelia Bernacchi.

== Partial filmography ==
- Loyalty of Love (1934) – Il banditore al patibolo
- Golden Arrow (1935) – Casellante stazione ferroviaria
- Lo squadrone bianco (1936) – El Fennek
- Hands Off Me! (1937) – Il capomastro
- The Former Mattia Pascal (1937) – Un ospite della pensione
- Tonight at Eleven (1938) – Il benzinaio
- A Thousand Lire a Month (1939) – Carletto, l'altro padrino
- Mad Animals (1939) – Il creditore
- The Fornaretto of Venice (1939) – Barnaba
- Torna, caro ideal! (1939) – Il medico
- Manon Lescaut (1940) – Un dei tre creditori
- La última falla (1940)
- Il signore della taverna (1940)
- Kean (1940) – Il medico
- Il ponte dei sospiri (1940)
- Il Bazar delle idee (1940)
- The Siege of the Alcazar (1940) – Venegas
- Eternal Melodies (1940) – Haydn
- Pinocchio (1940) – The Coachman (Italian version)
- La forza bruta (1941) – Paolo Perego
- The Prisoner of Santa Cruz (1941) – Sandro, suo marito
- Marco Visconti (1941)
- Merchant of Slaves (1942) – Un mercante
- Fedora (1942) – L'usuraio Barnstein
- We the Living (1942) – Member of the Epuration Commission
- O sole mio (1946)
- The Adulteress (1946) – Il vecchio dei gioielli
- Black Eagle (1946) – Il segretario Sputing
- Fury (1947) – Lawyer
- L'ebreo errante (1948)
- Fear and Sand (1948) – Banderillero
- The Earth Cries Out (1949) – Jafrem
- Buried Alive (1949) – Ferdinando
- A Night of Fame (1949) – Israelian Delegate
- Toto Looks for a House (1949) – Vice custode
- Toto the Sheik (1950) – Mohamed
- Fugitive in Trieste (1951)
- La prigioniera di Amalfi (1954)
- La campana di San Giusto (1954)
- Rigoletto (1956) – Sparafucile
- Tipi da spiaggia (1959) – Prince Joakim
- The Employee (1960) – Police Inspector Rock
- Those Two in the Legion (1962) – Police Commissioner
- The Godfather (1972) – Don Carlo Tramonti (uncredited)
