= Carmela (film) =

- Directed by: Flavio Calzavara
- Screenplay by: Corrado Alvaro; Flavio Calzavara; Italo Cremona
- Based on: "Vita Militare" by Edmondo De Amicis
- Produced by: Mario Borghi
- Cinematography: Gábor Pogány
- Edited by: Ignazio Ferronetti
- Music by: Franco Casavola
- Release date: 3 December 1942
- Running time: 90 minutes
- Country: Italy
- Language: Italian

Carmela is a 1942 Italian drama film directed by Flavio Calzavara, starring Doris Duranti and Pál Jávor. It is set on a small island in the Strait of Sicily in 1893, and tells the story of a young woman who is seduced by a soldier who promises to marry her, only to be abandoned soon after. When a new soldier is stationed on the island she tries to convince him to make the first soldier return. The film is based on Edmondo De Amicis' 1869 short story "Vita Militare".

== Cast ==
- Doris Duranti as Carmela Ferrari
- Pál Jávor as Il tenente Carlo Salvini
- Aldo Silvani as Il dottor Giulio Cavagnetti
- Egisto Olivieri as Il sindaco
- Anna Capodaglio as La madre di Carmela
- Bella Starace Sainati as Mamma Ada, la fattuchierra
- Enza Delbi as Teresita, la figlia del sindaco
- Lola Braccini as La moglie del sindaco
