= Ivo Battelli =

Italian architect

- Born: 12 March 1904; São Paulo, Brazil
- Died: 3 November 1994 (aged 90)
- Occupation: Architect

Ivo Battelli (12 March 1904 – 3 November 1994) was an Italian architect and set decorator. His work was part of the architecture event in the art competition at the 1932 Summer Olympics.

== Selected filmography ==
- The Dream of Butterfly (1939)
- The Birth of Salome (1940)
- Manon Lescaut (1940)
- The Palace on the River (1940)
- Beyond Love (1940)
- The Prisoner of Santa Cruz (1941)
- Black Gold (1942)
- To Live in Peace (1947)
- Buried Alive (1949)
- The Two Sisters (1950)
- Redemption (1952)
- A Mother Returns (1952)
- The Song of the Heart (1955)
- Goodbye Naples (1955)
