= The Palace on the River =

- Directed by: Alberto Salvi
- Written by: Guido Paolucci; Alberto Salvi
- Produced by: Edoardo Brescia
- Starring: Ferdinand Guillaume; Leda Gloria; Gildo Bocci
- Cinematography: Renato Del Frate
- Edited by: Ettore Salvi
- Music by: Alberto Paoletti
- Production company: Fotovox
- Distributed by: Consorzio Italiano Noleggiatori Filmi
- Release date: 30 June 1940
- Running time: 82 minutes
- Country: Italy
- Language: Italian

The Palace on the River (Italian: La Reggia sul fiume) is a 1940 Italian comedy film directed by Alberto Salvi and starring Ferdinand Guillaume, Leda Gloria and Gildo Bocci. Three penniless friends live in a slum by a river which they nickname "the palace". Taking pity on a struggling orphaned young woman, they take her in and look after her. In order to raise money so she can marry her sweetheart, they decide to try and collect a reward for capturing a notorious thief.

The film's sets were designed by the art director Ivo Battelli. It was shot at Cinecittà Studios in Rome.

== Cast ==
- Ferdinand Guillaume as Un barbone
- Gino Bianchi as L'altro barbone
- Gildo Bocci as Un terzo barbone
- Liana Persi as L'orfana
- Renzo Merusi as Il disoccupato
- Renato Chiantoni as Le scrittore illuso
- Giulio Alfieri
- Iginia Armilli
- Giulio Battiferri
- Oreste Bilancia
- Carlo De Cristofaro
- Leda Gloria
- Dante Maggio
- Guglielmina Marchi
- Carlo Seralessandri
- Giuseppe Zago

== Bibliography ==
- Francesco Savio. Ma l'amore no: realismo, formalismo, propaganda e telefoni bianchi nel cinema italiano di regime (1930-1943). Sonzogno, 1975.
