= Toto Looks for a Wife =

- Theatrical film poster
- Italian: Totò cerca moglie
- Directed by: Carlo Ludovico Bragaglia
- Written by: Agenore Incrocci; Sandro Continenza; Furio Scarpelli; Vittorio Metz
- Starring: Totò; Ave Ninchi; Aroldo Tieri
- Cinematography: Mario Albertelli
- Edited by: Renato Cinquini
- Music by: Franco Colosimo; Amedeo Escobar; Italia Savona
- Production company: Forum Film
- Distributed by: Variety Film
- Release date: 15 March 1950
- Running time: 76 minutes
- Country: Italy
- Language: Italian

Toto Looks for a Wife (Italian: Totò cerca moglie) is a 1950 Italian comedy film directed by Carlo Ludovico Bragaglia and starring Totò, Ave Ninchi and Marisa Merlini.

The film's art director was Alberto Boccianti.

== Plot ==
In 1950 in Australia, Aunt Agatha writes to her nephew Toto, informing him she won't send him more money to live in Italy until he gets married. Toto is in fact a happy bachelor who dabbles in sculpture and lives in luxury off his aunt's money. Now Toto's lifestyle is threatened and he's forced to find a partner before his aunt comes to Rome to meet the new couple. Thanks to a friend (Aroldo Tieri), Toto is helped, but the women are horrible or already ammogliate, which causes many misunderstandings. At the end bull is mistaken for a delinquent because of mistaken identity and misunderstanding continues when they come into the house of Toto's aunt and the new "wife", or a woman who is made to pay for pretending to be his wife Toto.

== Cast ==
- Totò as Toto
- Ave Ninchi as La zia
- Marisa Merlini as Luisa, the model
- Aroldo Tieri as Pippo, the painter
- Paul Muller as Carlo secret agent Z-15
- Mario Castellani as Filippo
- Nerio Bernardi as Giacinto
- Bruno Cantalamessa
- Giovanna Galletti as secret agent K-8
- Enzo Garinei as the son of Bellavista (as Vincenzo Garinei)
- Zoe Incrocci
- Elvi Lissiak as Adelina
- Anna Maestri as La nera australiana
- Nino Marchesini as signor Marco
- Mario Meniconi as Alberto
