= Beauties on Bicycles =

1951 film directed by Carlo Campogalliani

- Directed by: Carlo Campogalliani
- Written by: Mario Amendola; Marcello Marchesi; Vittorio Metz; Carlo Campogalliani
- Produced by: Aleandro Di Paolo
- Starring: Silvana Pampanini; Delia Scala
- Cinematography: Mario Montuori; Fernando Risi
- Edited by: Fernando Tropea
- Music by: Amedeo Escobar
- Production company: Edizione Distribuzione Italiana Cinematografica
- Distributed by: Edizione Distribuzione Italiana Cinematografica
- Release date: 27 February 1951
- Running time: 91 minutes
- Country: Italy
- Language: Italian

Beauties on Bicycles (Italian: Bellezze in bicicletta) is a 1951 Italian comedy film directed by Carlo Campogalliani and starring Silvana Pampanini and Delia Scala. It was filmed at the Cinecittà Studios in Rome with sets designed by Alfredo Montori. The film was one of the more popular productions released that year and was a financial success.

== Synopsis ==
Two young women travelling towards Milan to try to secure roles in a new musical comedy show enjoy a series of adventures which involve pretending to be soldiers and taking part in a bicycle race.

== Partial cast ==
- Silvana Pampanini as Silvana
- Delia Scala as Delia
- Franca Marzi as Maria
- Peppino De Filippo as First thief
- Renato Rascel as The mechanic's son
- Aroldo Tieri as Aroldo
- Carlo Ninchi as The manager
- Carlo Croccolo as Pinotto
- Arnoldo Foà as The sergeant
- Luigi Pavese as Reporter
- Dante Maggio as Second thief
- Carlo Romano as Darelli Manager
- Renato Valente as Giulio Darelli
- Oscar Andriani
- Nico Pepe
- Nerio Bernardi

== Bibliography ==
- Parish, Robert. Film Actors Guide. Scarecrow Press, 1977.
