= C'è sempre un ma! =

1942 film

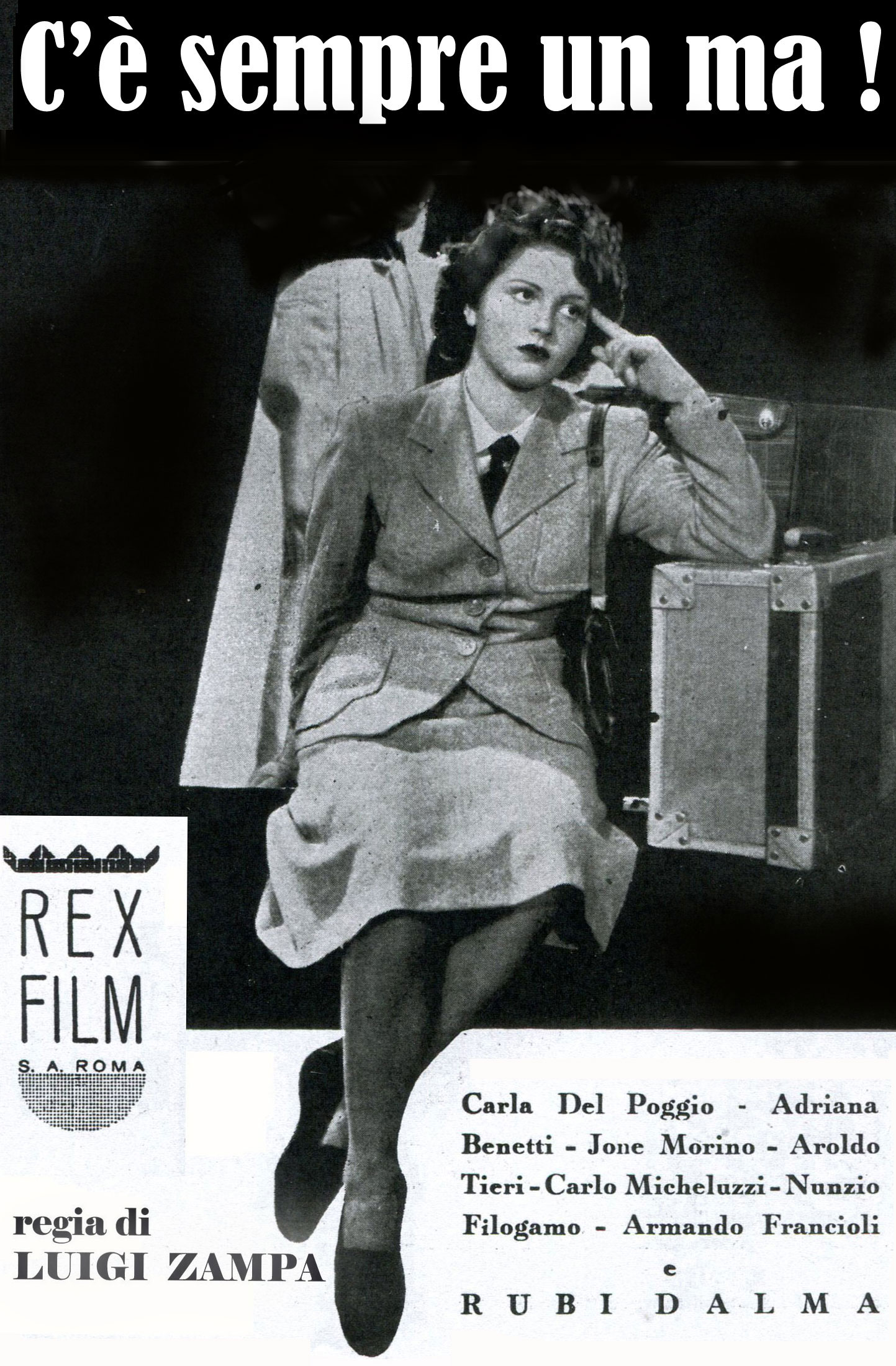
- Directed by: Luigi Zampa
- Written by: Gherardo Gherardi; Luigi Zampa; Cesare Zavattini
- Produced by: Carlo Borsari
- Starring: Carla Del Poggio
- Cinematography: Alberto Fusi
- Edited by: Rolando Benedetti
- Release date: 1942
- Running time: 83 minutes
- Country: Italy
- Language: Italian

C'è sempre un ma! is a 1942 Italian "white-telephones" drama film directed by Luigi Zampa and starring Carla Del Poggio.

== Cast ==
- Carla Del Poggio as Carla
- Adriana Benetti as Giulia
- Rubi Dalma as Laura
- Jone Morino as Isabella
- Aroldo Tieri as Carletto
- Armando Francioli as Fabrizio
- Carlo Micheluzzi as Il padre di Fabrizio
