= Rodolfo Lombardi =

Italian cinematographer

- Born: 27 September 1908; Rome, Lazio, Italy
- Died: 17 May 1985 (aged 76); Rome, Lazio, Italy
- Occupation: Cinematographer
- Years active: 1938–1966 (film)

Rodolfo Lombardi (1908–1985) was an Italian cinematographer.

== Selected filmography ==
- The Prisoner of Santa Cruz (1941)
- After Casanova's Fashion (1942)
- Non ti pago! (1942)
- Music on the Run (1943)
- Life Is Beautiful (1943)
- Special Correspondents (1943)
- Down with Misery (1945)
- The Black Eagle (1946)
- Desire (1946)
- Eleonora Duse (1947)
- The White Devil (1947)
- Eleven Men and a Ball (1948)
- Les Misérables (1948)
- The Mysterious Rider (1948)
- Cavalcade of Heroes (1950)
- The Lion of Amalfi (1950)
- Nobody's Children (1951)
- Seven Hours of Trouble (1951)
- Who Is Without Sin (1952)
- Falsehood (1952)
- Three Girls from Rome (1952)
- I Chose Love (1953)
- The World Condemns Them (1953)
- Vortice (1953)
- Cardinal Lambertini (1954)
- Theodora, Slave Empress (1954)
- The Mighty Crusaders (1957)

== Bibliography ==
- Bondanella, Peter. The Films of Roberto Rossellini. Cambridge University Press, 1993.
