= The Transporter (1950 film) =

1950 film

- Directed by: Giorgio Simonelli
- Written by: Pietro Garinei; Sandro Giovannini; Dino Maiuri; Mario Amendola; Ruggero Maccari; Vittorio Metz
- Produced by: Antonio Altoviti; Raffaele Colamonici; Umberto Montesi
- Starring: Peppino De Filippo; Silvana Pampanini; Lída Baarová; Aroldo Tieri
- Cinematography: Sergio Pesce
- Edited by: Giuseppe Vari
- Music by: Gino Filippini
- Production company: C.M. Produzione Film
- Distributed by: Regionale
- Release date: 4 November 1950
- Country: Italy
- Language: Italian

The Transporter (Italian: La bisarca) is a 1950 Italian comedy science fiction film directed by Giorgio Simonelli and starring Peppino De Filippo, Silvana Pampanini, Lída Baarová and Aroldo Tieri. It is based on a radio program with the same name.

It was shot at the Farnesina Studios in Rome. The film's sets were designed by the art director Alberto Boccianti. It earned 182 and a half million lira at the Italian box office.

== Synopsis ==
A barber is engaged to a manicurist working in the shop, but he grows jealous and picks a quarrel with one of the customers. Struck on the head he crashes into a radio playing a serial programme. Knocked unconscious he begins to have bizarre dreams about a deluge and a car transporter which functions as a Noah's Ark.

== Production ==
The film was based on the homonymous radio broadcast by Pietro Garinei and Sandro Giovannini, broadcast for two seasons from 1949 to 1951. A theatrical magazine was also taken from the radio broadcast, staged for the first time at the Sistina Theater in Rome. The film was shot in the Titanus studios at the Farnesina.

== Cast ==
- Peppino De Filippo as Toni La Motta
- Lída Baarová as Greta
- Clelia Matania as Dolores Garcia
- Silvana Pampanini as Mirella
- Aroldo Tieri as Alberto
- Carlo Campanini as Salvador Garcia
- Enrico Viarisio as Georges Durand
- Kay Medford as Anna Paperiska
- Maria Donati as Georges Durand's Wife
- Riccardo Billi as Noè
- Franco Coop as Otto Krüger
- Paul Muller as Complice di Anna Paperiska
- Galeazzo Benti as Cliente galante
- Tino Buazzelli as Dimitri
- Arturo Bragaglia as Mayor
- Virgilio Riento as Capo della banda di Arcachon
- Vittorio Sanipoli as Johnny
- Nietta Zocchi as Cliente di La Motta
- Bruno Corelli
- Mario Siletti
- Giulio Donnini
- Franco Pesce

== Bibliography ==
- Chiti, Roberto & Poppi, Roberto. Dizionario del cinema italiano: Dal 1945 al 1959. Gremese Editore, 1991.
- Gundle, Stephen. Fame Amid the Ruins: Italian Film Stardom in the Age of Neorealism. Berghahn Books, 2019.
