= Alberto Boccianti =

Italian art director

- Occupation: Art director
- Years active: 1942–1977 (film)

Alberto Boccianti was an Italian art director who designed the sets for more than a hundred films during his career.

== Selected filmography ==
- Two Hearts Among the Beasts (1943)
- Special Correspondents (1943)
- Come Back to Sorrento (1945)
- O sole mio (1946)
- The Brothers Karamazov (1947)
- The Street Has Many Dreams (1948)
- Toto Looks for a Wife (1950)
- Red Seal (1950)
- Figaro Here, Figaro There (1950)
- The Transporter (1950)
- The Young Caruso (1951)
- Toto the Third Man (1951)
- The Steamship Owner (1951)
- Free Escape (1951)
- Song of Spring (1951)
- My Heart Sings (1951)
- Don Lorenzo (1952)
- Poppy (1952)
- Sardinian Vendetta (1952)
- Red Love (1952)
- The Enchanting Enemy (1953)
- It Was She Who Wanted It! (1953)

== Bibliography ==
- Bayman, Louis. Directory of World Cinema: Italy. Intellect Books, 2011.
