= O sole mio (film) =

1946 film by Giacomo Gentilomo

- Directed by: Giacomo Gentilomo
- Written by: Mario Amendola; Gaspare Cataldo; Vincenzo Rovi; Mario Sequi; Ákos Tolnay
- Produced by: Luciano Doria
- Starring: Tito Gobbi; Adriana Benetti; Vera Carmi
- Cinematography: Anchise Brizzi; Tonino Delli Colli
- Edited by: Guido Bertoli
- Music by: Ezio Carabella
- Production company: Rinascimento Film
- Distributed by: Independenti Regionali; Les Films Corona (France)
- Release date: 7 January 1946
- Running time: 92 minutes
- Country: Italy
- Language: Italian

My Sun (Italian: O sole mio) is a 1946 Italian war drama film directed by Giacomo Gentilomo. It is considered one of the earliest films belonging to the genre of Italian neorealism, due to its use of exterior scenes and the inclusion of non-professional actors. It was shot at the Scalera Studios in Rome and on location around Naples. The film's sets were designed by the art director Alberto Boccianti. The film is set during the Four days of Naples in September 1943. Its title refers to the Neapolitan song "’O sole mio".

== Synopsis ==
Tito Gobbi stars as an Italian-American officer who is parachuted behind Axis lines to gather information on the movements of the German army and facilitate the allied landing. In Naples he comes into contact with local resistance groups and ordinary citizens, who then join in the revolt against the German occupiers.

== Cast ==
- Tito Gobbi as Giovanni, il cantante
- Adriana Benetti as La giovane padrona di casa
- Vera Carmi as Clara, la spia
- Arnoldo Foà as Peppino
- Carlo Ninchi as Il fratello di Clara
- Ernesto Almirante
- Vittorio Caprioli
- Salvatore Cuffaro
- Lily Granado
- Heinrich Bode
- Cesare Fantoni
- Armando Francioli
- Giovanni Petrucci
- Cesare Polacco
- Vittorio Sanipoli
- Domenico Serra

== See also ==
- Cinema of Italy

== Bibliography ==
- Moliterno, Gino. The A to Z of Italian Cinema. Scarecrow Press, 2009.
