= I'm the Hero =

1952 film

- Directed by: Carlo Ludovico Bragaglia
- Written by: Agenore Incrocci; Furio Scarpelli
- Produced by: Domenico Forges Davanzati
- Starring: Renato Rascel; Delia Scala; Marisa Merlini
- Cinematography: Marco Scarpelli
- Edited by: Mario Serandrei
- Music by: Renzo Rossellini
- Production company: Società Italiana Cines
- Distributed by: Lux Film
- Release date: 29 February 1952
- Running time: 85 minutes
- Country: Italy
- Language: Italian

I'm the Hero (Italian: L' eroe sono io) is a 1952 Italian comedy film directed by Carlo Ludovico Bragaglia and starring Renato Rascel, Delia Scala and Marisa Merlini. It was shot at the Cinecittà Studios in Rome. The film's sets were designed by the art director Alberto Tavazzi.

== Synopsis ==
Righetto falls in love with Silvia, who mistakenly believes him to be a photo novel star. When she discovers the truth she leaves him. However he becomes a hero by rescuing her from a gang of criminals.

== Cast ==
- Renato Rascel as Righetto
- Delia Scala as Silvia
- Andrea Checchi as Busatti
- Achille Togliani as Bob D'Alba
- Marisa Merlini as Lucille
- Francesco Golisano as Giuseppe
- Enzo Biliotti as De Santis
- Pasquale Fasciano as Tony Flanaghan
- Arturo Bragaglia as Medico condotto
- Gildo Bocci as Proprietario carrettino gelati
- Peppino De Martino as Er Pirata
- Gianni Baghino as Osvaldo, lo scassinatore

== Reception ==
An Italian review of the time states that ”This is a comedy that does not often provoke hilarity in the audience."

== Bibliography ==
- Chiti, Roberto & Poppi, Roberto. Dizionario del cinema italiano: Dal 1945 al 1959. Gremese Editore, 1991.
- Stewart, John. Italian Film: A Who's Who. McFarland, 1994.
