= Teresa Venerdì =

1941 film by Vittorio De Sica

- Film poster
- Directed by: Vittorio De Sica
- Written by: Gherardo Gheradi; Franco Riganti; Margherita Maglione; Vittorio De Sica; Rezső Török (novel)
- Produced by: Franco Magli
- Starring: Vittorio De Sica; Adriana Benetti; Anna Magnani; Irasema Dilián
- Cinematography: Mario Albertelli
- Edited by: Mario Bonotti
- Music by: Nuccio Fiorda; Renzo Rossellini
- Distributed by: Artisti Associati
- Release date: 1941
- Running time: 79 minutes
- Country: Italy
- Language: Italian

Teresa Venerdì is a 1941 Italian "white-telephones" comedy film directed by Vittorio De Sica. It is a remake of the 1938 Hungarian film Rézi Friday [the name of the character, Venerdi, meaning Friday in Italian].

== Cast ==
- Vittorio De Sica as Dr. Pietro Vignali
- Adriana Benetti as Teresa Venerdì
- Irasema Dilián as Lilli Passalacqua
- Guglielmo Barnabò as Agostino Passalacqua
- Olga Vittoria Gentilli as Rosa Passalacqua
- Anna Magnani as Maddalena Tentini/Loretta Prima
- Elvira Betrone as the director of the orphanage
- Giuditta Rissone as Anna (teacher)
- Virgilio Riento as Antonio
- Annibale Betrone as Umberto Vignali
- Nico Pepe as Dr. Pasquale Grosso
- Clara Auteri as Giuseppina
- Zaira La Fratta as Alice
- Alessandra Adari as Caterina (teacher)
- Lina Marengo as Mrs. Ricci

== See also ==
- Rézi Friday (1938)
