= Don Lorenzo (film) =

1952 film

- Directed by: Carlo Ludovico Bragaglia
- Written by: Agenore Incrocci Furio Scarpelli; Steno; Luigi Viganotti
- Produced by: Carlo Ludovico Bragaglia; Francesco Genovese Laboccetta
- Starring: Luciano Tajoli; Rossana Podestà; Andrea Checchi
- Cinematography: Anchise Brizzi
- Edited by: Roberto Cinquini
- Music by: Luciano Maraviglia
- Production company: Pincio Film
- Distributed by: Pincio Film
- Release date: 23 October 1952
- Running time: 90 minutes
- Country: Italy
- Language: Italian

Don Lorenzo is a 1952 Italian musical melodrama film directed by Carlo Ludovico Bragaglia and starring Luciano Tajoli, Rossana Podestà and Andrea Checchi. It was shot at the Cinecittà Studios in Rome. The film's sets were designed by the art director Alberto Boccianti.

== Cast ==
- Luciano Tajoli as Don Lorenzo
- Franco Interlenghi as Franco
- Rossana Podestà as Luisa
- Andrea Checchi as Carlo
- Arturo Bragaglia
- Dante Maggio as Beniamino
- Lea Padovani as Mara
- Carlo Ninchi
- Guglielmo Barnabò
- Liana Del Balzo

== Bibliography ==
- Accardo, Alessio. Age & Scarpelli: la storia si fa commedia. A.N.C.C.I., 2001.
