= It Was She Who Wanted It! =

1953 film

- Directed by: Marino Girolami
- Written by: Marcello Marchesi; Vittorio Metz
- Produced by: Isidoro Broggi
- Starring: Walter Chiari; Lucia Bosè; Carlo Campanini
- Cinematography: Riccardo Pallottini
- Edited by: Franco Fraticelli
- Music by: Giovanni D'Anzi; Vittorio Mascheroni
- Production company: Excelsa Film
- Distributed by: Minerva Film
- Release date: 1 April 1953
- Running time: 89 minutes
- Country: Italy
- Language: Italian

It Was She Who Wanted It! (Italian: Era lei che lo voleva!) is a 1953 Italian comedy film directed by Marino Girolami and starring Walter Chiari, Lucia Bosè and Carlo Campanini. The film's sets were designed by the art director Alberto Boccianti. It involves the emotional bickering between a psychiatrist and a rather brusque boxer.

== Plot ==
After seeing the famous Dinamite boxer in a sports magazine, a girl has visions, seeing in every person she meets the face of the boxer. Her doctor manages to remind her of having met him in a fleeting and unpleasant occasion, but concludes that the visions are the result of her unconscious love for the boxer.

== Cast ==
- Walter Chiari as Walter Martini
- Lucia Bosé as Nausicaa
- Carlo Campanini as Antonio
- Jone Morino as Donna Eva
- Giuseppe Porelli as Comm. Invernaghi
- Carmen de Lirio as Carmen
- Mario Ruspoli as The Cousin Raoul
- Belle Tildy as The Maid at Invernaghi's
- Giovanni D'Anzi as Kid Tartufi
- Rolf Tasna as Dr Rossi
- Enzo Fiermonte as a Puglie
- Ettore Bevilacqua as Galba
- Aldo Spoldi as Franco
- Tiberio Mitri as The Boxer Raoul
- Egisto Peire as Self
- Leone Jacovacci as The Punch-Drunk Boxer
- Carlo Orlandi as Boxer Guest at the Wedding Breakfast

== Bibliography ==
- Chiti, Roberto & Poppi, Roberto & Lancia, Enrico. Dizionario del cinema italiano: Dal 1945 al 1959. Gremese Editore, 1991.
- Hennessey, Brendan. Luchino Visconti and the Alchemy of Adaptation. State University of New York Press, 2021.
