= La pattuglia dell'Amba Alagi =

1953 film by Flavio Calzavara

- Directed by: Flavio Calzavara
- Screenplay by: Fulvio Palmieri; Flavio Calzavara; Guglielmo Santangelo
- Story by: Fulvio Palmieri; Francesco Granata-Vigo
- Starring: Luciano Tajoli; Milly Vitale
- Cinematography: Carlo Carlini
- Music by: Luciano Maraviglia
- Release date: 1953
- Language: Italian

La pattuglia dell'Amba Alagi (i. e. "The Patrol of Amba Alagi") is a 1953 Italian war melodrama film written and directed by Flavio Calzavara and starring Luciano Tajoli and Milly Vitale. It was a commercial success, as it grossed 469,2 million lire at the Italian box office.

== Cast ==
- Luciano Tajoli as Luciano
- Milly Vitale as Maria
- Dante Maggio as Ciccillo
- Giorgio De Lullo as Carlo
- Olga Solbelli as Carmela
- Aldo Silvani as Giovanni's Old Teacher
- Roberto Mauri as Turi
- Carla Calò as Elena
- Nino Pavese as The Major
- Anna Campori as The Major's Wife
- Mario Terribile as Giovanni
- Annette Ciarli as Marianina
- Nino Milano as Carmine
