= Flavio Calzavara =

Italian film director

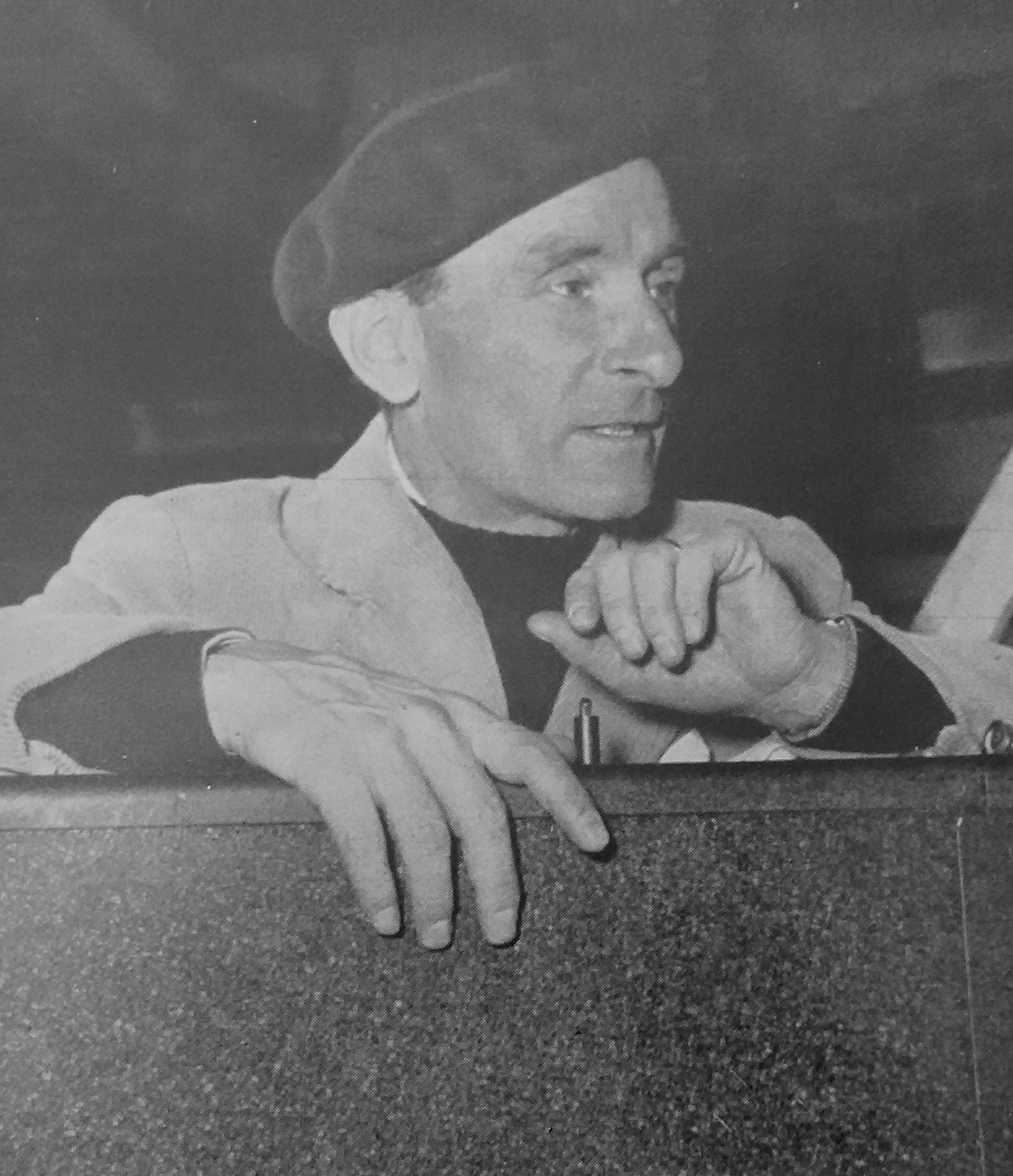
- Born: 21 February 1900; Istrana, Italy
- Died: 10 March 1981 (aged 81); Treviso, Italy
- Occupations: Film director, screenwriter
- Years active: 1939-1956

Flavio Calzavara (21 February 1900 – 10 March 1981) was an Italian film director and screenwriter. He directed 21 films between 1939 and 1956.

== Filmography ==
- Canzone proibita (1956)
- Gli occhi senza luce (1956)
- Napoli piange e ride (1954)
- Rigoletto e la sua tragedia (1954)
- El curioso impertinente (1953)
- Dieci canzoni d'amore da salvare (1953)
- La pattuglia dell'Amba Alagi (1953)
- I due derelitti (1951) Adaptation of the novel by Pierre Decourcelle
- Contro la legge (1950)
- Red Seal (1950)
- Peccatori (1945)
- Resurrection (1944)
- Calafuria (1943)
- Dagli Appennini alle Ande (1943)
- Carmela (1942)
- The Countess of Castiglione (1942)
- Confessione (1941)
- Don Buonaparte (1941)
- Il signore a doppio petto (1941)
- Il ladro sono io (1940)
- Piccoli naufraghi (1939)
