= Orio Caldiron =

Italian film critic (1938–2025)

- Born: 24 September 1938; Padua, Italy
- Died: 28 March 2025 (aged 86); Rome, Italy
- Occupation: Film critic

Orio Caldiron (24 September 1938 – 28 March 2025) was an Italian film critic, film historian and academic.

== Life and career ==
Caldiron graduated in philosophy from the University of Padua. He is best known for the book Il cinema italiano negli anni sessanta ('Italian cinema in the 1960s', 1969), which was described as "a fundamental analysis of an era of massive transformation for national cinema". His works include monographies about Totò, Vittorio De Sica, Pietro Germi, Cesare Zavattini, Isa Miranda, Carlo Ludovico Bragaglia, Giuseppe Rotunno. His last work was Sorprese di una grande stagione. Cinema, storie e miti tra Cinecittà e Hollywood ('Surprises of a Great Season: Cinema, stories and myths between Cinecittà and Hollywood', 2024).

During his career, he was editor-in-chief of the magazine Bianco e Nero, and served as president of the Centro Sperimentale di Cinematografia and as professor of film history and criticism at Sapienza University of Rome. He died on 28 March 2025, at the age of 86.
