= It's Love That's Ruining Me =

1951 film

- Directed by: Mario Soldati
- Written by: Enrico Blasi; Mario Monicelli; Steno; Bernardino Zapponi
- Produced by: Niccolò Theodoli
- Starring: Walter Chiari; Lucia Bosè; Aroldo Tieri
- Cinematography: Mario Montuori
- Edited by: Roberto Cinquini
- Music by: Mario Nascimbene
- Production company: Industrie Cinematografiche Sociali
- Distributed by: Industrie Cinematografiche Sociali
- Release date: 8 September 1951
- Running time: 101 minutes
- Country: Italy
- Language: Italian

It's Love That's Ruining Me (Italian: È l'amor che mi rovina) is a 1951 Italian comedy film directed by Mario Soldati and starring Walter Chiari, Lucia Bosè and Aroldo Tieri.

The film's sets were designed by the art director Guido Fiorini. Shooting took place in Turin and at the ski resort of Sestriere in the Alps. It earned around 137 million lira at the Italian box office.

== Synopsis ==
Walter, a salesman in a sports shop who is far from sporty, falls in love with the ski instructor Clara. In order to try and woo her he follows Clara to a ski resort where he gets mixed up with network of foreign spies trying to smuggle a stolen explosive out of the country.

== Cast ==
- Walter Chiari as Walter Palaccioni
- Lucia Bosé as Clara Montesi
- Aroldo Tieri as Carlo
- Eduardo Ciannelli as Capo delle spie
- Jackie Frost as Olga Voronowska
- Virgilio Riento as Proprietario Negozio

== Bibliography ==
- Aprà, Adriano. The Fabulous Thirties: Italian cinema 1929-1944. Electa International, 1979.
- Chiti, Roberto & Poppi, Roberto. Dizionario del cinema italiano: Dal 1945 al 1959. Gremese Editore, 1991.
