= Jone Morino =

Italian actress (1896–1978)

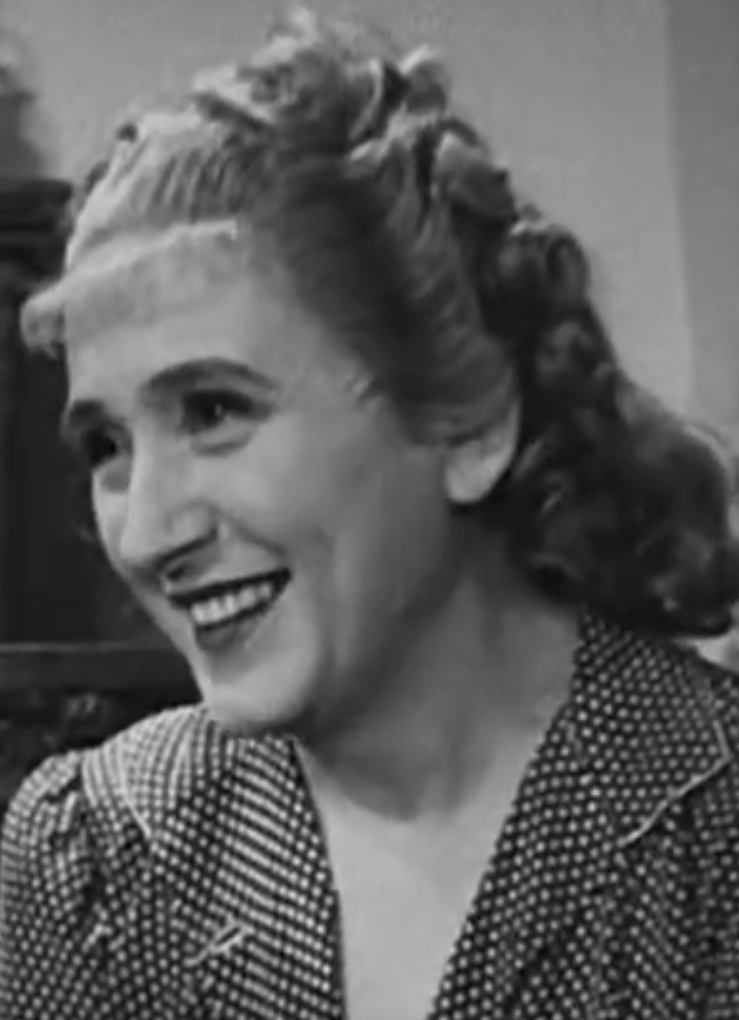
- Morino in Before the Postman (1942)
- Born: Jone Nicola Morino; 28 April 1896; Rome, Kingdom of Italy
- Died: 14 September 1978 (aged 82); Rome, Italy
- Occupation: Actress

Jone Morino (28 April 1896 – 14 September 1978) was an Italian film and stage actress.

== Life and career ==
Born in Rome, at young age Morino started working on stage alongside her sister Maria, best known as 'Mariola'. She worked in important theatrical companies, including those by Eleonora Duse, Ruggero Ruggeri, Peppino De Filippo and Giorgio Strehler. In cinema, she started being active in the 1920s, appearing in a few silent films, and after a long pause reprised her film career in the late 1930s, specializing in comedic character roles. Between 1954 and 1969, she served as an acting teacher at the Accademia Nazionale d'Arte Drammatica Silvio D'Amico. In 1978, while living in a nursing home and battling depression, she committed suicide by jumping into the Tiber.

== Filmography ==
- The House of Shame (1938)
- Validita Giorni 10 (1940) - Signora Torquada
- Manovre d'amore (1941) - Matilde
- Turbine (1941) - Giovanna
- Piccolo mondo antico (1941) - Donna Eugenia
- Solitudine (1941) - Contessa Carli
- Margherita fra i tre' (1942) - Renata
- C'e sempre un ma! (1942) - Isabella
- Invisible Chains (1942) - La madre di Enrico
- Signorinette (1942)
- Soltanto un bacio (1942) - La Contessa Matilde
- Alone at Last (1942) - Signora Mariani
- Se io fossi onesto (1942) - Magda Englesh
- L'Ultino addio (1942) - Madre Di Irene
- Le bie del cuore (1942) - L'Amica Pettegola
- L'Amico delle donne (1942) - Ortensia Leverdet
- Avanti c'è posto / Before the Postman (1942) - Signora svampita
- Senza una donna (1943) - Donna Gloria
- Il fidanzato di mia moglie (1943) - Matilde Sarti
- Non sono superstizioso... ma! (1943) - La madre di Rosetta
- La sua strada (1943)
- Inquietudine (1946)
- Il delitto di Giovanni Episcopo (1947)
- I pirati di Capri (1948)
- Duello senza onore (1949)
- Lo sparviero del Nilo / Hawk of the Nile (1949) - Madame Corinne
- Taxi di notte / Night Taxi (1950)
- Canzone di primavera / Song of Spring (1950) - Fanny
- Domenica d'agosto (1950)
- Stasera Sciopero (1951)
- Altri tempi (1951) - Zia Maddalena ("L'idillio")
- Romanzano d'amore (1951) - Signora Contini
- Il segreto delle tre punte (1952)
- A fil di spada (1952)
- It Was She Who Wanted It! (1953) - Donna Eva
- Questa è la vita (1954) - La moglie dell'amministratore ("Marsina stretta")
- Sette canzoni per sette sorelle (1956)
