= María Mercader =

Spanish actress (1918–2011)

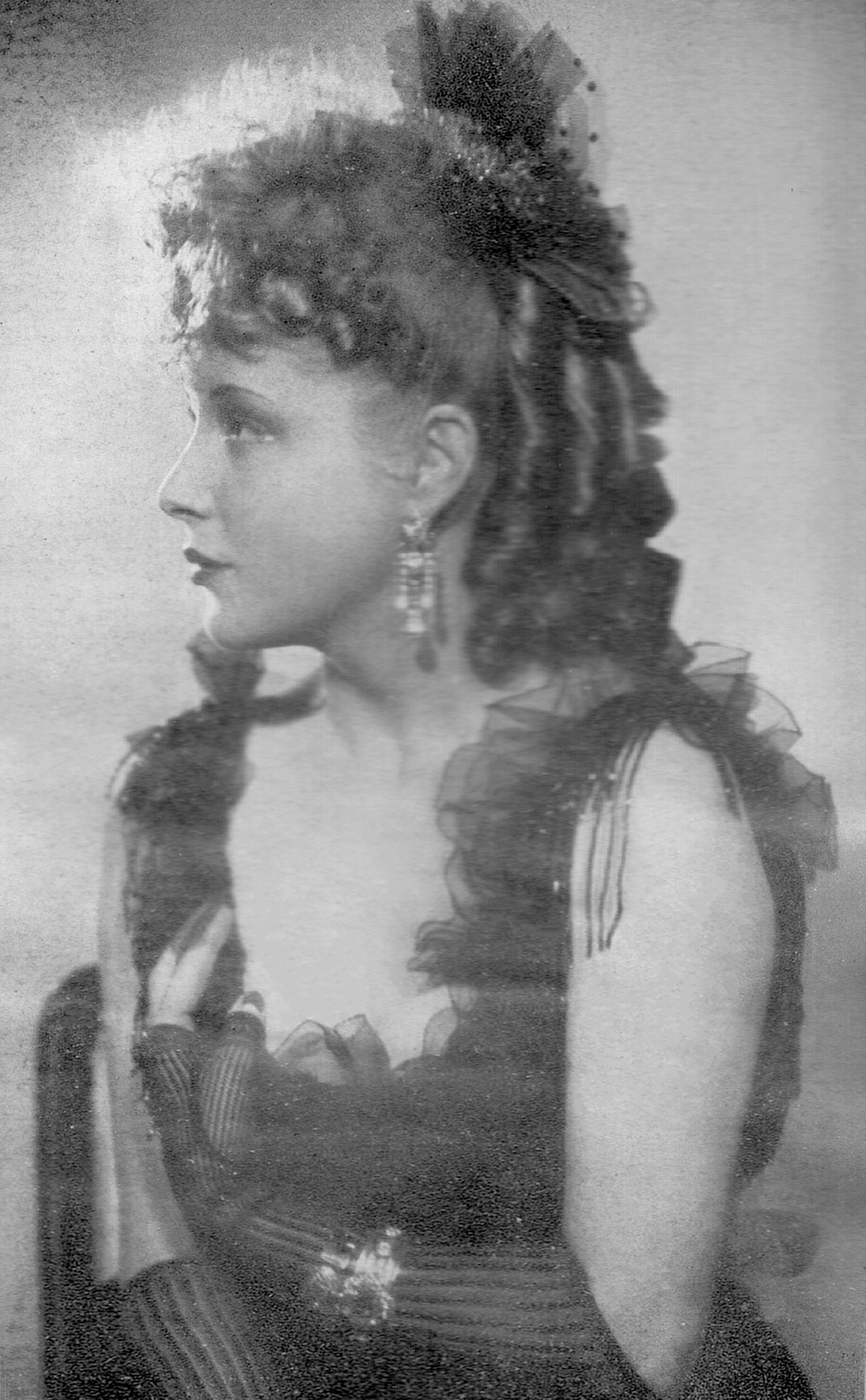
- Mercader in 1941
- Born: María de la Asunción Mercader Forcada; 6 March 1918; Barcelona, Spain
- Died: 26 January 2011 (aged 92); Rome, Italy
- Occupation: Actress
- Years active: 1923–1992
- Spouses: Giuliano Scicolone (m. 1949; div. 1955); Vittorio De Sica (m. 1968; died 1974)
- Children: Manuel De Sica; Christian De Sica
- Parents: Luís Mercader Marina (father); María Salses (mother)
- Relatives: Caridad del Río (aunt by marriage); Ramón Mercader (cousin)

María de la Asunción Mercader Forcada (Spanish: [maˈɾi.a meɾkaˈðeɾ]; Catalan: Maria de l'Assumpció Mercader i Forcada [məˈɾi.ə məɾkəˈðe]; 6 March 1918 – 26 January 2011) was a Spanish film actress who appeared in some forty films between 1923 and 1992. She moved to Italy in 1939, later becoming the second wife of film director Vittorio De Sica.

Mercader's paternal aunt by marriage was Caridad Mercader, whose son Ramón Mercader murdered Russian revolutionary Leon Trotsky in 1940.

== Filmography ==
Year	Title	Role	Notes
1923	La bruja		
1939	Molinos de viento	Margarita	
1939	L'étrange nuit de Noël	Conchita	
1939	Il segreto inviolabile	Virginia	
1940	La gerla di papà Martin	Giorgina	
1940	Marianela	Florentina	
1940	Su mayor aventura		
1940	Then We'll Get a Divorce	Grace Peterson	
1940	Una famiglia impossibile	Edvige Bartolla	
1941	La forza bruta	Nell	
1941	The Prisoner of Santa Cruz	Carmela	
1941	The Actor Who Disappeared	L'attrice ingenua	
1941	Due cuori sotto sequestro	La studentessa	
1941	Thrill	Cristina Palffy	
1941	The King's Jester	Gilda	
1942	L'uomo venuto dal mare	La fidanzata del marinaio	
1942	Se io fossi onesto	Clara	
1942	A Garibaldian in the Convent	Mariella Dominiani	
1942	Alone at Last	Angela	
1942	Forbidden Music	Claretta Melzi	
1942	Madrid de mis sueños	Consuelo Aguilera	
1942	La fanciulla dell'altra riva	Manuela Vega	
1943	Il treno crociato	Clara	
1943	Life Is Beautiful	Nadina	
1943	Non sono superstizioso... ma!	Rosetta De Rosa	
1943	I nostri sogni	Matilde Moscapelli detta 'Titi'	
1943	La primadonna	Costanza Salvotti	
1945	No Turning Back	Vinca	
1945	The Gates of Heaven	Maria	
1945	L'ippocampo	Donata Sandi	
1945	The Song of Life	Maria	
1947	Christmas at Camp 119	Fiammetta	
1948	Heart	Clotilde Serra, la maestrina della Penna Rossa	
1948	The Mysterious Rider	Elisabetta	
1952	Hello Elephant	Maria Caretti	
1976	Giovannino	Giovannino's mother	
1984	Claretta	Princess of Montenevoso	
1988	Lights and Shadows	La Mare	
1991	The House of Smiles	Elvira	
1991	Count Max	Madre di Pierre	
1992	Al lupo al lupo	Presentatrice Premiazione	(final film role)
