= Mad Animals =

- Directed by: Carlo Ludovico Bragaglia
- Written by: Ivo Perilli; Ettore Maria Margadonna; Gaetano Campanile-Mancini; Achille Campanile; Carlo Ludovico Bragaglia
- Produced by: Carlo José Bassoli; Gustavo Lombardo
- Starring: Totò; Luisa Ferida; Calisto Bertramo; Lilia Dale
- Cinematography: Otello Martelli
- Edited by: Giacinto Solito
- Music by: Ezio Carabella; Luigi Colacicchi
- Production company: Titanus Film
- Distributed by: ODIT
- Release date: April 1939
- Running time: 72 minutes
- Country: Italy
- Language: Italian

Mad Animals (Italian:Animali pazzi) is a 1939 Italian "white-telephones" comedy film directed by Carlo Ludovico Bragaglia and starring Totò, Luisa Ferida and Calisto Bertramo. It was made at the Titanus Studios in Rome.

== Plot ==
Baron Tolomeo dei Tolemei is about to receive the inheritance of a relative, just died. The legacy, however, as he wants the will, must go in part to finance a medical structure for crazy animals. Only then Baron Tolomeo may have the rich heritage. The affair proves complicated, because Tolomeo has a love affair with the beautiful Maria Luisa. The troubles continue when in life of Tolomeo breaks his poor twin-brother Antonio, physically like him, who secretly falls in love with Maria Luisa.

== Cast ==
- Totò as Barone Tolomeo dei Tolomei/His brother
- Luisa Ferida as Maria Luisa
- Calisto Bertramo as Fabrizio, il maggiordomo
- Lilia Dale as Ninetta
- Dina Perbellini as La direttrice dell'ospedale degli animali
- Bianca Stagno Bellincioni as Zia Elisa
- Claudio Ermelli as Il notaio
- Raffaele Giachini as Il pretendente
- Cesare Polacco as Il creditore
- Pina Gallini as La proprietaria del cavallo pazzo

== Bibliography ==
- Moliterno, Gino. Historical Dictionary of Italian Cinema. Scarecrow Press, 2008.
