= 47 morto che parla =

- Directed by: Carlo Ludovico Bragaglia
- Written by: Ettore Petrolini, Agenore Incrocci, Furio Scarpelli
- Produced by: Isidoro Broggi
- Starring: Totò and Silvana Pampanini
- Cinematography: Mario Albertelli
- Edited by: Giuliana Attenni
- Music by: Ezio Carabella
- Distributed by: F.C. Produzioni
- Release date: 1950
- Running time: 89 minutes
- Country: Italy
- Language: Italian

47 morto che parla is a 1950 Italian comedy film directed by Carlo Ludovico Bragaglia. The film stars Totò and Silvana Pampanini. The plot tells about Antonio Peletti (Totò), a widower and very frugal baron who falls in love with a girl, Rosetta, who works in a local. But his son Gastone too is in love with her: to marry Rosetta and to build a family of his own, he asks his father the heritage who his grand-father left. The baron denies he'd have the inheritance and, out of his temper, drives his son out of their home. Rosetta follows the son. After a series of awesome circumstances, Gastone and Rosetta happily marry. The surly baron too will find a way to soften his hearth. An extraordinary Antonio De Curtis (the real name of Totò) shows another time he was not only an artist of 'Rivista' (a kind of show which took place in Italy in the early years of the past Century) but also a good actor of Cinema. As nearly always in the movies he performed, he makes what he wants. The public, nevertheless, agrees with him: his movies were nearly always watched by millions of Italians. Who, after the tragedy of the Second World War, had just the need to smile. The director of this movie is Carlo Ludovico Bragaglia, two other actors to mention are the beautiful and capable Silvana Pampanini and the hilarious Carlo Croccolo.

== Plot ==
The story is set in a small town near Naples in early 1900. Baron Antonio Peletti is a stingy and cruel man who thinks only of spending the bare minimum needed for his son and future daughter-in-law, even though he lives in a luxurious house. The servant Contrado is forced to go hungry because of the miser. In fact, every time Antonio has to spend even a penny to buy something, he complains of unnecessary waste, exclaiming: "And I pay, and I pay!!" But one day his son wants to steal a box full of gold coins that Antonio hid under the bed, as a way of revenge. But in order to steal the gold, the son needs the complicity of all higher institutions in the city, including the mayor, one of the most bitter enemies of Antonio. The mayor wants to build a primary school for the children of the village, but the cruel Antonio prevents the funding because he does not want to throw out a penny! So the pharmacist gives Antonio a sleeping pill and deceives him into believing that he drank poison accidentally. Antonio wakes and believes he is in Hell, where he sees the really desolate condition of the villagers. Then the Baron meets a soul who persuades him to donate money to the mayor's box to set up the school. Only then will Antonio be redeemed from his sins in the past and go to Purgatory. However, during this operation something goes wrong and Antonio realizes the trap of the villagers. The son, in order not to lose money, steals the box of gold and runs away in a balloon with his girlfriend, but Antonio catches up to him and the three hover in the air. But due to a failure of the balloon, they start to descend towards the sea and so must lighten it; Antonio is forced into tears and falls overboard with his heavy box full of gold coins. He is thought to have sunk somewhere near Sardinia, but at the end of the story, the Baron, coming back from the island on a donkey on the very day of inauguration, eventually understands his mistakes and decides to finance the project of founding the school.

== Cast ==
- Totò as Il barone Antonio Peletti
- Silvana Pampanini as Madame Bonbon, la canzonettista
- Carlo Croccolo as Gontrano
- Adriana Benetti as Rosetta
- Dante Maggio as Dante Cartoni, il partner della canzonettista
- Tina Lattanzi as La moglie dei sindaco
- Aldo Bufi Landi as Gastone
- Eduardo Passarelli as Il farmacista
- Arturo Bragaglia as Il sindaco
- Mario Castellani as Il colonnello Bertrand de Tassigny
- Gildo Bocci as Il macellaio
- Franco Pucci as Il dottore
- Gigi Reder as Spa's Usher
