= Adriana Benetti =

Italian actress (1919–2016)

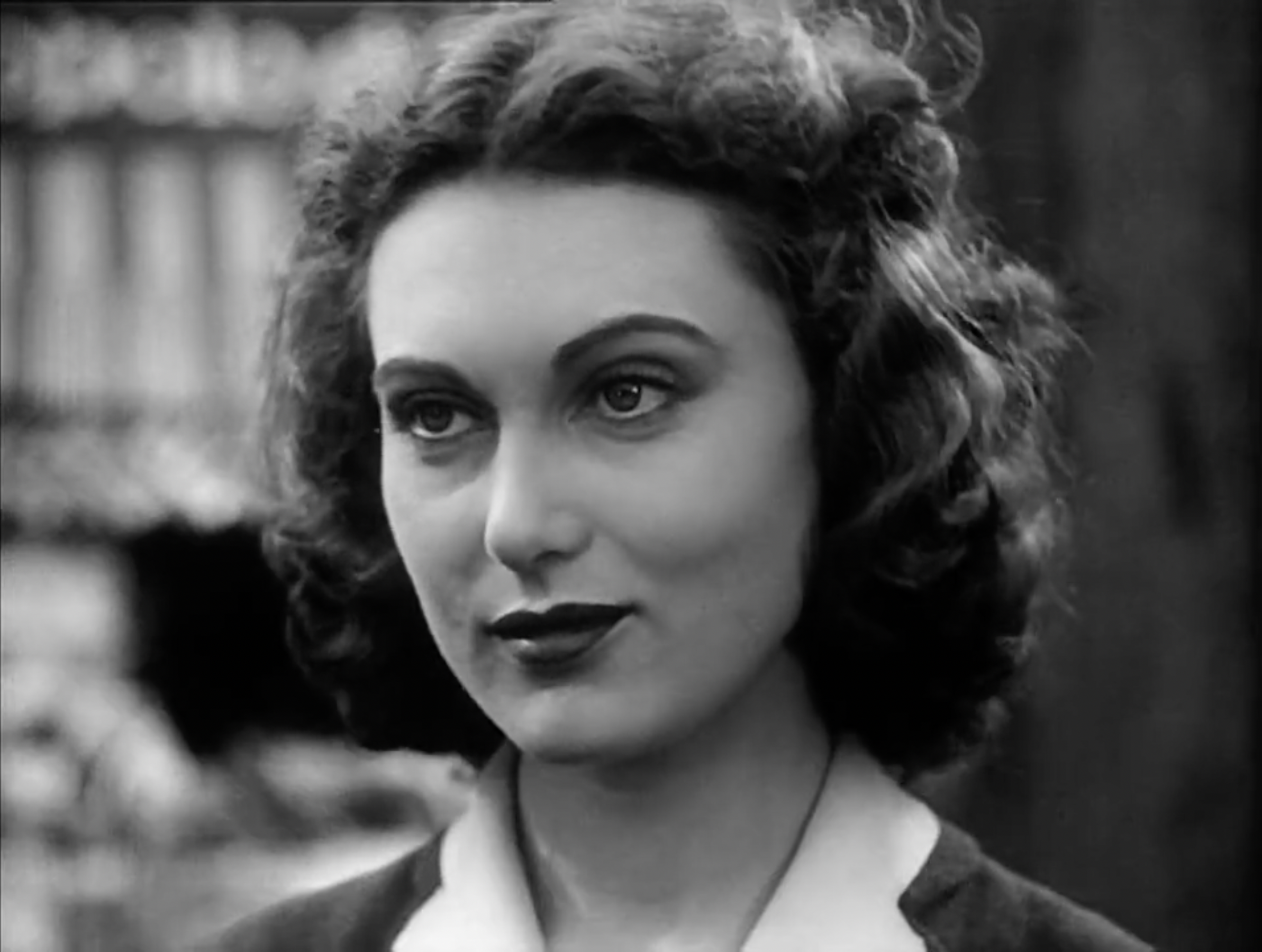
- Benetti in Before the Postman (1942)
- Born: 19 December 1919; Ferrara, Italy
- Died: 24 February 2016 (aged 96)
- Occupation: Actress
- Years active: 1941–1957

Adriana Benetti (12 December 1919 – 24 February 2016) was an Italian actress.

== Biography ==
Born in Quacchio, a town east of Ferrara, Benetti graduated from the Istituto Magistrale and then landed in Rome, where she was accepted at the Centro Sperimentale di Cinematografia. While there, she was discovered by Vittorio De Sica and subsequently made her debut at age 22 in his 1941 film Teresa Venerdì as the title character.

In 1942, she appeared in director Alessandro Blasetti's celebrated Four Steps in the Clouds, where she supported Gino Cervi in Luigi Zampa's C'è sempre un ma!, and Avanti c'è posto..., alongside Andrea Checchi and Aldo Fabrizi. In 1943, she played in Mario Soldati's Quartieri alti with Massimo Serato and Vittorio Sanipoli and in Marc Allégret's Les Petites du quai aux fleurs with Bernard Blier and Gérard Philipe.

In 1945, she appeared in two musicals, Torna a Sorrento with Gino Bechi and O sole mio with opera singer Tito Gobbi. In 1946, she appeared with Fosco Giachetti in Il sole di Montecassino and with Eduardo and Titina De Filippo in Uno tra la folla.

In 1947, she appeared in Goffredo Alessandrini's Furia, alongside Rossano Brazzi, in Giorgio Ferroni's Tombolo, paradiso nero with Lucio De Caro and in Manù il contrabbandiere with André Cayatte. That same year, she scandalized Italy by posing in a bikini for the weekly newspaper Tempo illustrato. In 1950, she acted with Totò in 47 morto che parla.

She specialised in ingénue roles and was known as "fidanzatina d'Italia" (Italy's little fiancée), a term coined for her by Assia Noris. Because of this, as she aged, her film appearances became less frequent. She played a teacher in 1955's Eighteen Year Olds (a remake of Schoolgirl Diary) and an older woman in 1957's A vent'anni è sempre festa, after which she retired from cinema.

== Filmography ==
- Teresa Venerdì, directed by Vittorio De Sica (1941)
- C'è sempre un ma!, directed by Luigi Zampa (1942)
- Before the Postman, directed by Mario Bonnard (1942)
- Four Steps in the Clouds, directed by Alessandro Blasetti (1942)
- Gente dell'aria, directed by Esodo Pratelli (1942)
- I quattro di Bir El Gobi, directed by Giuseppe Orioli (1942)
- In High Places, directed by Mario Soldati (1943)
- Flying Squadron, directed by Luigi Capuano (1943)
- Tempesta sul golfo, directed by Gennaro Righelli (1943)
- O sole mio, directed by Giacomo Gentilomo (1945)
- Il sole di Montecassino, directed by Giuseppe Maria Scotese (1945)
- Torna a Sorrento, directed by Carlo Ludovico Bragaglia (1945)
- Inquietudine, directed by Vittorio Carpignano and Emilio Cordero (1946)
- Uno tra la folla, directed by Ennio Cerlesi (1946)
- Fury, directed by Goffredo Alessandrini (1947)
- Tombolo, paradiso nero, directed by Giorgio Ferroni (1947)
- Manù il contrabbandiere, directed by Lucio De Caro (1947)
- Night Arrival, directed by José Antonio Nieves Conde (1949)
- Neutrality, directed by Eusebio Fernández Ardavín (1949)
- 47 morto che parla, directed by Carlo Ludovico Bragaglia (1950)
- Nobody's Wife, directed by Gonzalo Delgrás (1950)
- The Last Days of Pompeii, directed by Marcel L'Herbier and Paolo Moffa (1950)
- Donde comienzan los pantanos, directed by Antonio Ber Ciani (1952)
- Dark River, directed by Hugo del Carril (1952)
- The Two Orphans, directed by Giacomo Gentilomo (1954)
- Eighteen Year Olds, directed by Mario Mattoli (1955)
- A vent'anni è sempre festa, directed by Vittorio Duse (1957)
