= My Widow and I =

- Directed by: Carlo Ludovico Bragaglia
- Written by: Aldo De Benedetti
- Starring: Vittorio De Sica; Isa Miranda; Gino Cervi
- Cinematography: Arturo Gallea
- Music by: Nino Rota
- Release date: 1945
- Language: Italian

My Widow and I (Italian: Lo sbaglio di essere vivo) is a 1945 Italian comedy film directed by Carlo Ludovico Bragaglia and starring Vittorio De Sica, Isa Miranda and Gino Cervi.

== Plot ==
Young Adriano Lari falls into a cataleptic state—perhaps due to acute indigestion—and is pronounced dead. He wakes up the evening before the funeral and, despite his wife Maria's objections, decides to keep up the charade; he hides the fact that he survived so he can collect a substantial insurance payout.

Two months later, using the money they received, the couple treats themselves to an out-of-town trip. However, on the train, Maria runs into Mr. Guglielmi—a childhood friend who later became her husband's employer. While Adriano stays out of sight to avoid exposing the ruse, Guglielmi feels free to woo Maria—whom he believes to be a widow and has long loved—and declares his intention to marry her. Trying to get back to Adriano, Maria pretends she needs to get off at the next station, but Guglielmi follows her; he even decides to accompany her by bus to the mountain village of Monte Sant'Angelo and stay at the same hotel.

There, a misunderstanding leads to a meeting between Guglielmi and Adriano; the latter introduces himself as the deceased man's strikingly similar brother, thereby managing to avoid exposure. For several days, Adriano finds himself in the awkward position of sharing a hotel room with his wife's suitor, who confides in him and asks for advice on how to win Maria over. To keep his identity secret, Adriano cannot rebuff Guglielmi's persistent advances, and—lacking identification documents—he is unable to find work upon returning to the city.

When Guglielmi invites them to lunch at his mother's villa, Adriano realizes the situation has become untenable and that Maria, all things considered, is not unhappy living with her wealthy suitor. He therefore gives up on ousting the interloper and decides to disappear, allowing the two to marry and live happily. In a letter, Adriano reveals the whole story—writing that he has committed suicide—and secretly watches Maria’s insincere tears.

Unable to work and with nowhere to live other than his own grave, Adriano is determined to end it all for real, but the cemetery caretaker dissuades him; the film ends with Adriano accepting the only option left to him: living in the caretaker's house, located right where his grave is.

== Cast ==
- Vittorio De Sica as Adriano Lari
- Isa Miranda as Maria, sua moglie
- Gino Cervi as Mr. Guglielmi
- Dina Galli as Adriano's Mother
- Luigi Almirante as The Cemetery Caretaker
- Edda Soligo as The Neighbor
- Giuseppe Pierozzi as The Doctor
- Amalia Pellegrini
- Liliana Laine

== Production ==
The fictional town of "Monte Sant'Angelo," where much of the film takes place, is actually the ski resort village of Pian de' Valli on Mount Terminillo (in the province of Rieti); the hotel where the three characters stay is the Hotel Belvedere-Savoia—where the interior scenes were filmed—while the bus they take to get there belongs to the SAURA company.
