= The Secret of Three Points =

1952 film

- Directed by: Carlo Ludovico Bragaglia
- Written by: Age & Scarpelli
- Cinematography: Mario Albertelli
- Music by: Alessandro Cicognini
- Distributed by: Variety Distribution
- Release date: 26 September 1952
- Country: Italy
- Language: Italian

The Secret of Three Points (Italian: Il segreto delle tre punte, also known as Three Points and The Three Points) is a 1952 Italian adventure film directed by Carlo Ludovico Bragaglia.

== Cast ==
- Massimo Girotti as Massimo del Colle
- Tamara Lees as Countess Marion Lamberti
- Umberto Spadaro as Colonel Grimaldi
- Roldano Lupi as Duke of Melia
- Piero Pastore as Riccardo Albertini
- Arturo Bragaglia as The Innkeeper
- Ignazio Leone
- Paola Quattrini
