= Fear No Evil (1945 film) =

1945 film

- Directed by: Giuseppe Maria Scotese
- Screenplay by: Giuseppe Maria Scotese; Diego Fabbri; Mario Monicelli; Giorgio Lastricati
- Produced by: Maleno Malenotti
- Starring: Fosco Giachetti; Adriana Benetti; Nino Pavese
- Cinematography: Carlo Montuori
- Edited by: Mario Serandei
- Music by: Giovanni Fusco
- Production company: Arno Film
- Distributed by: Minerva Film
- Release date: 21 September 1945
- Running time: 84 minutes
- Country: Italy
- Language: Italian
- Box office: 48,000,000 Lire at 31 December 1952

Fear No Evil (Italian: Il sole di Montecassino) is a 1945 Italian drama film directed by Giuseppe Maria Scotese and starring Fosco Giachetti, Adriana Benetti and Liliana Laine. It is based on a book written by Diego Fabbri about the life of Benedict of Nursia.

== Plot ==
Italy, February 1944. Some civilians are fleeing the bombing of Monte Cassino (depicted with actual footage from World War II newsreels). One of them, looking on helplessly as the abbey is being blown up, cries that God has forsaken mankind. Another refugee, who happens to be a friar from the abbey, retorts that it is not true and proceeds to narrate how, even at the time of the fall of the Western Roman Empire, in a wasteland similar to World War II, God produced a man like Benedict of Nursia whose sanctity helped restore the European civilization.

At this point the movie flashbacks to 500 AD. Benedict, a Roman nobleman, leaves his privileged patrician heritage and withdraws in a cave, willing to live according to the Gospels. Little by little he assembles a community of fellow monks, and he dedicates his entire life to teaching the Christian disciplines, becoming a Saint in the process and performing several miracles for the glory of God.

== Reception ==
One might expect a rather static, slow-paced film with this subject, but this film moves at a brisk pace with a good deal of action sequences which keep up a lively interest for viewers. Fosco Giachietti plays the title role with gravity, dignity, and authority, portraying the humility and dedication of the saint. Alfredo Varelli is a standout as the macho young Marco, a warlike mountain shepherd who becomes Benedict's first adherent and most loyal supporter. Altogether a fascinating account of the founding of the first Christian monastic order, very effective even in the English dubbed version».

— User review, IMDb

== Cast ==
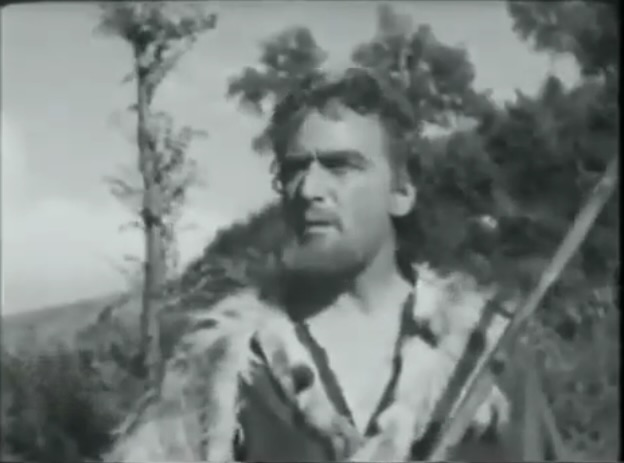
Fosco Giachetti as Saint Benedict

- Fosco Giachetti as Benedict
- Adriana Benetti as Faustina
- Liliana Laine as Sabina
- Nino Pavese as Zalla
- Alfredo Varelli as Marco
- Manoel Roero as Nicandro
- Virgilio Tomassini as Terenzio
- Anna Maria Padoan as Livia

== See also ==
- Benedictine Order
- Middle Ages in film
