= Arturo Bragaglia =

Italian actor (1893–1962)

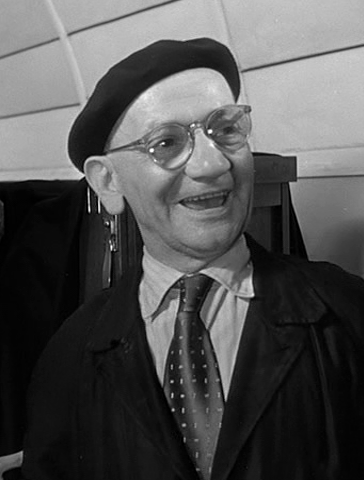
- Bragaglia in Bellissima (1951)
- Born: 7 January 1893; Frosinone, Kingdom of Italy
- Died: 21 January 1962 (aged 69); Rome, Italy
- Occupation: Actor
- Years active: 1938–1961
- Relatives: Anton Giulio Bragaglia (brother); Carlo Ludovico Bragaglia (brother)

Arturo Bragaglia (7 January 1893 – 21 January 1962) was an Italian actor. He appeared in more than one hundred films from 1938 to 1961.

== Selected filmography ==
Year	Title	Role	Notes
1939	Defendant, Stand Up!		
1940	Goodbye Youth		
1940	Maddalena, Zero for Conduct		
1940	One Hundred Thousand Dollars		
1941	Beatrice Cenci		
1941	The Actor Who Disappeared		
1941	The Secret Lover		
1942	Invisible Chains		
1942	Once a Week		
1942	Before the Postman		
1942	Four Steps in the Clouds		
1942	The Lady Is Fickle		
1942	Headlights in the Fog		
1943	Two Hearts Among the Beasts		
1943	Life Is Beautiful		
1943	Calafuria		
1945	I'll Sing No More		
1946	A Yank in Rome		
1950	47 morto che parla		
1950	The Knight Has Arrived!		
1950	The Transporter		
1950	Bluebeard's Six Wives		
1951	Buon viaggio pover'uomo		
1951	Cameriera bella presenza offresi...		
1951	Bellissima		
1951	The Reluctant Magician		
1951	Seven Hours of Trouble		
1951	The Black Crown		
1951	Miracle in Milan		
1952	Altri tempi		
1952	Ha da venì... don Calogero!		
1952	At Sword's Edge		
1952	Don Lorenzo		
1952	I'm the Hero		
1952	The Secret of Three Points		
1953	Saluti e baci		
1953	The Return of Don Camillo		
1953	The Most Wanted Man		
1953	It's Never Too Late		
1954	Sins of Casanova		
1954	Cose da pazzi		
1954	Mid-Century Loves		
1955	Ore 10: lezione di canto		
1955	Golden Vein		
1956	The Rival		
1957	The Mysteries of Paris		
1959	The Employee		
1959	Prisoner of the Volga		
1961	The Two Marshals		
