= Piero Tellini =

Italian screenwriter and film director (1917–1985)

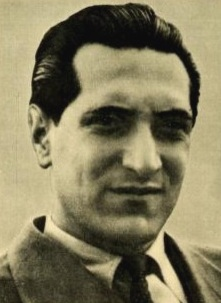
- Born: Piero Giuseppe Tellini; 16 January 1917; Florence, Italy
- Died: 22 June 1985 (aged 68); Florence, Italy
- Resting place: San Miniato al Monte, Florence, Italy
- Occupation(s): Film director, Screenwriter
- Spouse(s): Liliana Tellini, Joan Tellini
- Children: Massimo, Marco, Donina, Elizabeth, Chiara

Piero Tellini (16 January 1917 – 22 June 1985) was an Italian screenwriter and film director.

Born in Florence, the son of the soprano Ines Alfani, Tellini graduated at the Centro Sperimentale di Cinematografia in Rome and in 1938 he entered the cinema industry as an assistant director. He later dedicated to the activity of screenwriter, contributing to the success of the Italian neorealism and notably collaborating with Luigi Zampa, Alberto Lattuada, Michelangelo Antonioni, Alessandro Blasetti and Eduardo De Filippo.

In 1947 Tellini won the Nastro d'Argento for the script of Zampa's To Live in Peace, while in 1952 he was awarded the Best Screenplay Award at the Cannes Film Festival for Mario Monicelli's and Steno's Cops and Robbers. Starting from 1954 he was also active as a film director.

He was first married to actress Liliana Tellini, with whom he had one child, Massimo.

In 1965, he married Jo Anne Bosshard (Spokane, 1 December 1931 – Everett, Washington, 1 November 2002). The two met in Spain, had one child, Chiara (born 1965), and lived between Whidbey Island and Italy for years.

== Selected filmography ==
- Captain Fracasse (1940)
- The Mask of Cesare Borgia (1941)
- Fourth Page (1942)
- Apparition (1943)
- To Live in Peace (1947)
- Alarm Bells (1949)
- Nel blu dipinto di blu (1959)
