= Carlo Ludovico Bragaglia =

Italian film director (1894–1998)

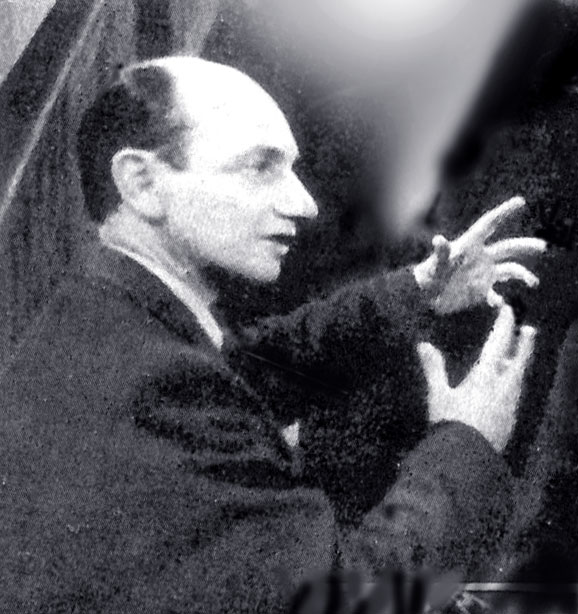
- Bragaglia in 1942
- Born: 8 July 1894; Frosinone, Kingdom of Italy
- Died: 4 January 1998 (aged 103); Rome, Italy
- Occupations: Film director Screenwriter
- Years active: 1933–1963
- Relatives: Anton Giulio Bragaglia (brother); Arturo Bragaglia (brother)

Carlo Ludovico Bragaglia (8 July 1894 – 4 January 1998) was an Italian film director whose career spanned from the 1930s to the mid-1960s. He mainly directed adventure pictures and popular comedies, including some starring Totò. His 1942 film Non ti pago! was shown as part of a retrospective on Italian comedy at the 67th Venice International Film Festival.

== Life and career ==
Bragaglia was born in Frosinone, Latium, and was a veteran of World War I. Together with his brother Arturo, Bragaglia started his career as a photographer, specialized in portraits of actresses, and began to experiment avant-garde photographic techniques like "fotodinamica". He later founded with his other brother Anton Giulio the Casa d'arte Bragaglia, which quickly became a popular attraction for Rome artists, and an independent theater, "Teatro Sperimentale degli Indipendenti" (1923–1936). After having served as stage director in his theater, in 1930 Bragaglia was put under contract by Cines Studios as set photographer, also undertaking a short apprenticeship as an editor and assistant director, and collaborating with Alessandro Blasetti, Gennaro Righelli and Guido Brignone.

After directing a few documentaries, in 1932 Bragaglia made his feature film debut with Your Money or Your Life, based on a radio play by Alessandro De Stefani. The film was greatly inspired by René Clair, while his lead actor Sergio Tofano basically reprised his comic strip character Signor Bonaventura. Following the moderate success of the film, Bragaglia specialized in the Telefoni Bianchi genre, with a few exceptions like the realist dramas Tomb of the Angels and The Prisoner of Santa Cruz and the surreal Totò comedy Mad Animals. After the war he continued his career, being active in various genres, including sword-and-sandal and swashbuckling films.

Upon his 100th birthday in 1994, the Locarno Film Festival showed a film retrospective of his works. Being that he lived well into his second century Bragaglia became known as a famed storyteller who provided a wealth of information and anecdotes concerning the early days of Italian cinema. He died in Rome in 1998 after a fall which fractured his hip.

== Filmography ==
- Your Money or Your Life (1932)
- Non son gelosa (1933)
- Bad Subject (1933)
- Quella vecchia canaglia (1934)
- Unripe Fruit (1934)
- Amore (1936)
- Tomb of the Angels (1937)
- Belle o brutte si sposan tutte... (1939)
- Mad Animals (1939)
- L'amore si fa così (1939)
- Un mare di guai (1939)
- Two on a Vacation (1940)
- Alessandro, sei grande! (1940)
- Una famiglia impossibile (1941)
- La forza bruta (1941)
- The Prisoner of Santa Cruz (1941)
- Barbablù (1941)
- The Happy Ghost (1941)
- Due cuori sotto sequestro (1941)
- La scuola dei timidi (1941)
- Se io fossi onesto (1942)
- Violets in Their Hair (1942)
- La guardia del corpo (1942)
- Non ti pago! (1942)
- After Casanova's Fashion (1942)
- Music on the Run (1943)
- Life Is Beautiful (1943)
- Non sono superstizioso... ma! (1943)
- Il fidanzato di mia moglie (1943)
- Tutta la vita in ventiquattr'ore (1943)
- Torna a Sorrento (1945)
- My Widow and I (1945)
- Hotel Luna, Room 34 (1946)
- Pronto chi parla? (1946)
- The White Primrose (1947)
- The Other (1947)
- Totò Le Mokò (1949)
- Il falco rosso (1949)
- Toto Looks for a Wife (1950)
- Bluebeard's Six Wives (1950)
- Figaro Here, Figaro There (1950)
- 47 morto che parla (1950)
- Una bruna indiavolata! (1951)
- The Secret of Three Points (1952)
- I'm the Hero (1952)
- Don Lorenzo (1952)
- At Sword's Edge (1952)
- Orient Express (1954)
- Il falco d'oro (1955)
- Queen of Babylon (1955)
- Lazzarella (1957)
- Io, mammeta e tu (1958)
- Tuppe tuppe, Marescià! (1958)
- Caporale di giornata (1958)
- The Mighty Crusaders (1958)
- The Sword and the Cross (1958)
- Le cameriere (1959)
- Hannibal (1959)
- The Loves of Hercules (1960)
- Amazons of Rome (1961)
- Ursus in the Valley of the Lions (1961)
- Pastasciutta nel deserto (1961)
- The Four Monks (1962)
- The Four Musketeers (1963)
