= List of Italian films of 1941 =

A list of films produced in Italy under Fascist rule in 1941 (see 1941 in film):

Title	Director	Cast	Genre	Notes
1941
L' Accademia dei vent'anni				
L' Amore canta	Ferdinando Maria Poggioli	Maria Denis, Massimo Serato	Comedy	
The Actor Who Disappeared	Luigi Zampa	Vivi Gioi, María Mercader, Giulio Donadio	Comedy mystery	
The Adventuress from the Floor Above	Raffaello Matarazzo	Vittorio De Sica, Clara Calamai, Camillo Pilotto	Comedy	
Beatrice Cenci	Guido Brignone	Carola Höhn, Giulio Donadio, Tina Lattanzi	Historical	
The Betrothed	Mario Camerini	Gino Cervi, Dina Sassoli, Armando Falconi	Historical	
The Brambilla Family Go on Holiday	Carl Boese	Cesco Baseggio, Massimo Girotti, Paolo Stoppa	Comedy	
First Love	Carmine Gallone	Leonardo Cortese, Vivi Gioi, Valentina Cortese	Comedy	
The Happy Ghost	Amleto Palermi	Toto, Luigi Pavese, Isa Bellini	Comedy	
A Husband for the Month of April	Giorgio Simonelli	Vanna Vanni, Carlo Romano, Pina Renzi	Comedy	
Idyll in Budapest	Gabriele Varriale	Germaine Aussey, Osvaldo Valenti, Sergio Tofano	Comedy	
The Iron Crown	Alessandro Blasetti	Massimo Girotti, Gino Cervi, Paolo Stoppa, Luisa Ferida, Elisa Cegani	Fantasy, Adventure	Best Italian Film Venice Film Festival
The King's Jester	Mario Bonnard	Michel Simon, María Mercader, Doris Duranti	Historical	
The King of England Will Not Pay	Giovacchino Forzano	Andrea Checchi, Silvana Jachino, Osvaldo Valenti	Historical	
The Jester's Supper	Alessandro Blasetti	Amedeo Nazzari, Clara Calamai, Osvaldo Valenti, Valentina Cortese	Drama	
The Last Dance	Camillo Mastrocinque	Elsa Merlini, Amedeo Nazzari, Renato Cialente	Comedy	
Light in the Darkness	Mario Mattoli	Fosco Giachetti, Alida Valli, Clara Calamai	Drama	
Lucky Night	Raffaello Matarazzo	Peppino De Filippo, Leda Gloria, Vera Bergman	Comedy	
Marco Visconti	Mario Bonnard	Carlo Ninchi, Roberto Villa, Mariella Lotti	Historical	
The Mask of Cesare Borgia	Duilio Coletti	Osvaldo Valenti, Elsa De Giorgi, Carlo Tamberlani	Historical	
Piccolo mondo antico	Mario Soldati	Alida Valli, Massimo Serato, Ada Dondini	Drama	Based on the Antonio Fogazzaro's novel.
Pirates of Malaya	Enrico Guazzoni	Massimo Girotti, Clara Calamai, Luigi Pavese	Adventure	
The Prisoner of Santa Cruz	Carlo Ludovico Bragaglia	Juan de Landa, María Mercader, Giuseppe Rinaldi	Drama	
Scampolo	Nunzio Malasomma	Lilia Silvi, Amedeo Nazzari, Carlo Romano	Comedy	
The Secret Lover	Carmine Gallone	Alida Valli, Fosco Giachetti, Osvaldo Valenti	Drama	
Uomini sul fondo	Francesco De Robertis	Real navy men	Documentary	Mussolini's Propaganda about Italian naval forces
Teresa Venerdì	Vittorio De Sica	Vittorio De Sica, Adriana Benetti, Anna Magnani	Comedy	
Thrill	Giacomo Gentilomo	Umberto Melnati, María Mercader, Clara Calamai	Mystery thriller	
Tosca	Carl Koch, Jean Renoir	Imperio Argentina, Michel Simon, Rossano Brazzi	Musical drama	
The Two Tigers	Giorgio Simonelli	Massimo Girotti, Luigi Pavese, Sandro Ruffini	Adventure	
The White Ship	Roberto Rossellini	Amateur actors	Drama	Propaganda film. Influence on neorealism
