= Umberto Sclanizza =

Umberto Sclanizza (1893–1951) was an Italian theatre and cinema actor from Friuli-Venezia Giulia. His film work straddles a period in Italian cinema, 1936–1943, when the industry was largely devoted to the production of mildly propagandistic works, such as Il Re d'Inghilterra non paga (The King of England Will Not Pay) (1941). This type of old-fashioned classical drama, often infused with thinly veiled Axis sympathies, was to indirectly pave the way for the Italian Neorealism movement, which rejected the melodrama style and consigned it to the industry's past.

== Early life ==
Umberto Sclanizza was born in Friuli, Italy on 26 February 1893, of Slavic (Slovenian) and noble origins. His parents separated when he was a child, and his father Vittorio took him and his sister Iole to Buenos Aires, Argentina, where Vittorio set up in business among the enormous Italian community there. Here Umberto was drawn to the theatre and began training as an actor.

In 1915 Italy joined the Allied side in the First World War, and passage was arranged to take young migrant Italians back to their native country to fight. Umberto Sclanizza served in the Army as a front line cook during the war.

He decided to remain in Italy after the war, and began working in touring theatre. Through the theatre company he met and married Maria Papa, an actor from the opposite end of Italy (Rosarno, Calabria) who came from a family involved in the theatre for many generations. Three children Scilla Sclaviza (aka Scilla Sclanizza) (1926–2006), Mario Sclaniza (aka Mario Sclanizza) (1927–1993), Iole Sclanizza (1928-2015) were born of the marriage, and a fourth died - along with the mother - during childbirth, around 1930.

After the Italian conquest of Abyssinia in 1935-6 theatre companies including that of Umberto Sclanizza were invited to tour in the new Italian East Africa colonies, with significant government subsidies, under the pretext of bringing civilised European culture to Africa.

== Film career ==
As the Second World War approached, Umberto Sclanizza attempted to evacuate his family; his mother had gone to live in Egypt after her divorce, where she had remarried and given birth to a daughter, Ida Ruffato, in 1900. But as the British Embassy was about to issue Visas for Egypt, Italy entered the war on the side of the Axis. Ironically, it was this period that offered the break into films for which he is remembered.

His films included: Un' Avventura di Salvator Rosa (An Adventure of Salvator Rosa) (1940); Sei bambine ed il Perseo (Perseus and the six children) (1940); Il Re d'Inghilterra non paga (The King of England Will Not Pay) (1941); Don Buonaparte (1941); Don Cesare di Bazan (1942) aka La Lama del giustiziere, (The Executioner's Blade Italy: reissue title). Umberto Sclanizza worked with leading Italian actors (such as Gino Cervi) and pioneering directors and producers such as Alessandro Blasetti (considered a precursor of Italian neorealism), Flavio Calzavara and Giovacchino Forzano, whose Tirrenia Film Studio (founded in 1934) formed the north-Italian competition for Cinecittà for many years, before finally crumbling.

The war came home to Italy in 1943 and the country was divided in bitter civil war. The film movement that emerged from the turmoil, characterised by Italian Neorealism, had little need of classical practitioners like Umberto Sclanizza and Giovacchino Forzano, whose careers never recovered from the association with Fascism. Demoralised and stricken by ill-health, he returned occasionally to theatre work before his death in Venice on 14 December 1951.

== Selected filmography ==
- Il Grande Silenzio (The Great Silence) (1936) dir. Giovanni Zannini for Veritas Film
- Un' Avventura di Salvator Rosa (An Adventure of Salvator Rosa) (1940) dir. Alessandro Blasetti
- Sei bambine e il Perseo (Perseus and the six children) (1940) (in the role of "Bertino") dir. Giovacchino Forzano
- The King of England Will Not Pay (1941) in the role of "il primo acciaiolo" (cast alongside Aroldo Ficarra, the pair listed as "gli Acciaioli") dir. Giovacchino Forzano for Pisorno-Arno-Incine
- Don Buonaparte (1941) (in the role of "Il Cavaliere") dir. Flavio Calzavara for Pisorno-Viralba
- Don Cesare di Bazan (1942) aka La Lama del giustiziere, (The Executioner's Blade, reissue title) (in the role of "Il Taverniere") prod. and dir. Riccardo Freda for Elica Artisti Associati
- Calafuria (1943) dir. Flavio Calzavara
