= Mario Sclaniza =

Italian actor and producer

Mario Sclaniza (1927–1993) - sometimes spelt Sclanizza - was an Italian actor and producer who worked in film and theatre for four decades, starting as a child actor in the 1940s mainly in films starred in by his father, Umberto Sclanizza. The patriarch of this prolific Italian acting dynasty often found roles for his children Mario and Scilla Sclanizza.

Mario Sclaniza was born in Bormio in the extreme north of Italy while the family were working in travelling theatre, and it is a testament to the extent of their travels that Mario's sister, Scilla Sclanizza, was born at the opposite end of the country the previous year.

His first screen role in his own right came in 1940 with Gli Ultimi Della Strada ("The Lowest Of The Low") directed by Domenico Paolella at Pisorno Studios in Tirrenia, an early attempt at the gritty social frankness later to develop into the Italian Neorealism film movement.

The Italian film industry - and the Sclanizza family - struggled to survive during the Second World War and Mario Sclaniza dedicated himself to successful theatre projects in the post-war period. He died in Modena in 1993 aged 66.
