= Il prezzo della gloria =

- Directed by: Antonio Musu
- Cinematography: Renato Del Frate
- Music by: Carlo Rustichelli
- Release date: 1955
- Country: Italy
- Language: Italian

Il prezzo della gloria is a 1955 Italian war film. It stars actor Gabriele Ferzetti.

== Plot ==
The story takes place on the torpedo boat Sparviero and focuses on the disagreement between the unit commander, Alberto Bruni, and his first officer, Lieutenant Stefano Valli, second in command. But the commander is wounded, and then his collaborator concludes the dangerous mission alone.

== Cast ==
- Gabriele Ferzetti: Comm. Alberto Bruni
- Dina Perbellini: Aunt Dora
- Pierre Cressoy:Lt. Stefano Valli
- Nino Marchetti: Ruggero's father
- Anita Durante: Aunt Bettina
- Mike Bongiorno: Ruggero Grimaldi
- Fiorella Mari: Luisa
- Riccardo Garrone: Morabito
- Liliana Gerace: Ms. Sandri
- Eleonora Rossi Drago
