= The Leopard (1963 film) =

1963 historical drama film by Luchino Visconti

- Original film poster
- Italian: Il Gattopardo
- Literally: The Serval
- Directed by: Luchino Visconti
- Screenplay by: Suso Cecchi d'Amico; Pasquale Festa Campanile; Enrico Medioli; Massimo Franciosa; Luchino Visconti
- Based on: The Leopard by Giuseppe Tomasi di Lampedusa
- Produced by: Goffredo Lombardo
- Starring: Burt Lancaster; Claudia Cardinale; Alain Delon; Paolo Stoppa; Rina Morelli; Romolo Valli; Serge Reggiani
- Cinematography: Giuseppe Rotunno
- Edited by: Mario Serandrei
- Music by: Nino Rota
- Distributed by: Titanus (Italy); Pathé-Cinéma (France)
- Release dates: 27 March 1963 (Italy); 20 May 1963 (France)
- Running time: 195 minutes (Cannes cut); 185 minutes (Italian cut); 171 minutes (European cut)
- Countries: Italy; France
- Language: Italian
- Box office: $1,800,000 (US/Canada rentals); 3,649,498 admissions (France)

The Leopard (Italian: Il Gattopardo, lit. 'The Serval' [il ˌɡattoˈpardo]) is a 1963 epic historical drama film directed by Luchino Visconti. Written by Visconti, Suso Cecchi d'Amico, Enrico Medioli, Pasquale Festa Campanile, and Massimo Franciosa, the film is an adaptation of the 1958 novel by Giuseppe Tomasi di Lampedusa.

Burt Lancaster stars as Don Fabrizio Corbera, an aging Sicilian prince caught up in the sociopolitical turmoil of the Risorgimento (Italian unification) during the mid-19th century, with Alain Delon as his opportunistic nephew Tancredi, and Claudia Cardinale as his goddaughter. Paolo Stoppa, Rina Morelli, Romolo Valli, Serge Reggiani, and Terence Hill play supporting roles. The film was an international co-production between Italian studio Titanus and French studio Pathé.

The film won the Palme d'Or at the 1963 Cannes Film Festival, and was released theatrically in Italy on March 28, 1963, and in France on June 14. It was a critical and commercial success in Europe, but reception was more lukewarm in the United States, where a truncated, English-dubbed cut was released. Retrospective reviews—of the film's longer original cut—have been more positive, and the film is now widely regarded as a classic and one of the greatest movies ever made.

In 2008, the film was included on the Italian Ministry of Cultural Heritage's 100 Italian films to be saved, a list of 100 films that "have changed the collective memory of the country between 1942 and 1978."

== Plot ==
In Sicily in the year 1860, Don Fabrizio Corbera, Prince of Salina, enjoys the customary comforts and privileges of his ancestry. War has broken out between the armies of Francis II of the Two Sicilies and the insurgent volunteer redshirts of Giuseppe Garibaldi. Among the rebels is the Prince's nephew, Tancredi Falconeri, whose romantic politics the Prince hesitantly accepts with some whimsical sympathy. Upset by the uprising, the Prince departs to Palermo. Garibaldi's army subjugates the city and expropriates Sicily from the Bourbons. The Prince muses upon the inevitability of change, with the middle class displacing the ruling class while on the surface everything remains the same. Refusing to bend to the tide of changes, the Prince departs to his summer palace at Donnafugata.

A new national assembly calls a plebiscite and the nationalists win 512–0, thanks to the corruption and support of the town's leading citizen, Don Calogero Sedara. Don Calogero is invited to the villa of the Corberas, and he brings his daughter Angelica with him. Both the Prince and Tancredi are taken by Angelica's beauty. Soon thereafter, Tancredi makes plans to ask for her hand in marriage. The Prince sees the wisdom of the match because he knows that, due to his nephew's vaulting ambition, Tancredi will be in need of ready cash, which Angelica's father will happily provide. With the blessing of both the Prince and Don Calogero, Tancredi and Angelica get engaged. Noticing Tancredi shift his allegiance from Garibaldi to King Victor Emmanuel's newly formed army, the Prince wistfully judges that his nephew is the kind of opportunist who will flourish in the new Italy.

Cavalier Chevalley, a representative from the Kingdom of Sardinia, comes to the Prince's villa. He pleads with the Prince to join the senate of the nascent Kingdom of Italy, hoping that the Prince's great compassion and wisdom will help alleviate the perceived poverty and alleged ignorance on the streets of Sicily. However, the Prince demurs and refuses this invitation, observing that, in his view, Sicily prefers its traditions to the delusions of modernity because its people are proud of their ancient heritage. He says he foresees his brand of aristocratic rulers, whom he refers to as leopards and lions, being replaced by more bureaucratic rulers, whom he calls jackals and hyenas, but that everyone, including the "sheep" of the general public, will continue to see themselves as the "salt of the earth". The Prince recommends Don Calogero would make a more appropriate senator.

The Corberas, including Tancredi, attend a great ball at the villa of a neighbouring prince, and the event marks the debut of Angelica in high society. Afflicted by a combination of melancholia and the ridiculousness of the nouveau riche, the Prince wanders forlornly from room to room, increasingly disaffected by the entire edifice of the society he so gallantly represents—until Angelica approaches and asks him to dance. He accepts and, momentarily, recaptures and presents the elegant and dashing figure of his past self, but, after the dance, he quickly becomes disenchanted again.

Early in the morning, the guests leave the ball. The prince leaves the ball alone. Walking with a heavy heart through the empty streets, he pauses to let a hurrying priest pass and enter a home to deliver last rites, and then walks into a dark alley that symbolises Italy's fading past, to which he feels he belongs.

== Cast ==
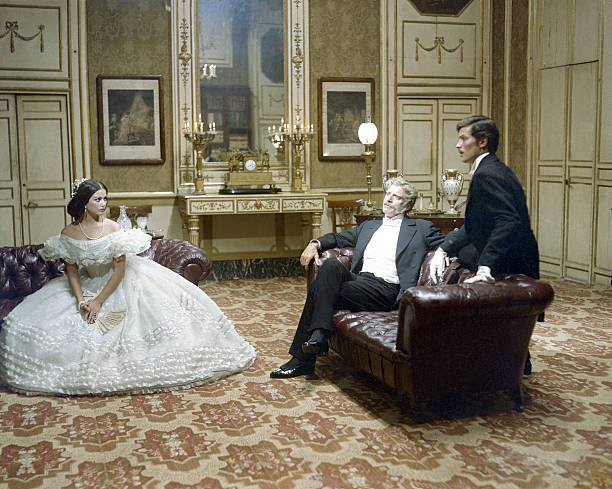
From left to right: Claudia Cardinale as Angelica, Burt Lancaster as Don Fabrizio, and Alain Delon as Tancredi.

- Burt Lancaster as Don Fabrizio Corbera, Prince of Salina
- Claudia Cardinale as Angelica Sedara / Bertiana Sedara, Don Calogero's wife and Angelica's mother
- Alain Delon as Prince Tancredi Falconeri, Don Fabrizio's nephew
- Paolo Stoppa as Don Calogero Sedara, Mayor of Donnafugata
- Rina Morelli as Princess Maria Stella Corbera di Salina, Don Fabrizio's wife
- Romolo Valli as Father Pirrone, chaplain of Salina
- Ivo Garrani as Colonel Pallavicino
- Leslie French as Cavalier Chevalley
- Serge Reggiani as Don Francisco "Ciccio" Tumeo
- Terence Hill (credited as Mario Girotti) as Count Cavriaghi
- Pierre Clémenti as Francesco Paolo Corbera di Salina
- Lucilla Morlacchi as Concetta Corbera di Salina
- Giuliano Gemma as the redshirt general
- Ida Galli as Carolina Corbera di Salina
- Ottavia Piccolo as Caterina Corbera di Salina
- Carlo Valenzano as Paolo Corbera di Salina
- Brook Fuller as Fabrizietto Corbera di Salina
- Anna Maria Bottini as Mademoiselle Dombreuil, the Corberas' governess
- Lola Braccini as Donna Margherita
- Marino Masé as the Corberas' tutor
- Howard Nelson Rubien as Don Diego
- Rina De Liguoro as Princess of Presicce
- Franco Gulà as Mimi, the Corberas' majordomo
- Olimpia Cavalli as Mariannina

== Production ==
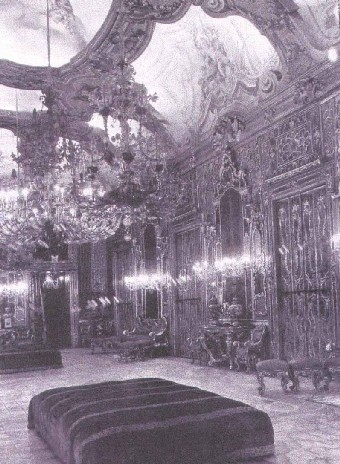
The ballroom of Palazzo Valguarnera-Gangi, where the ballroom sequence was shot.

=== Development ===
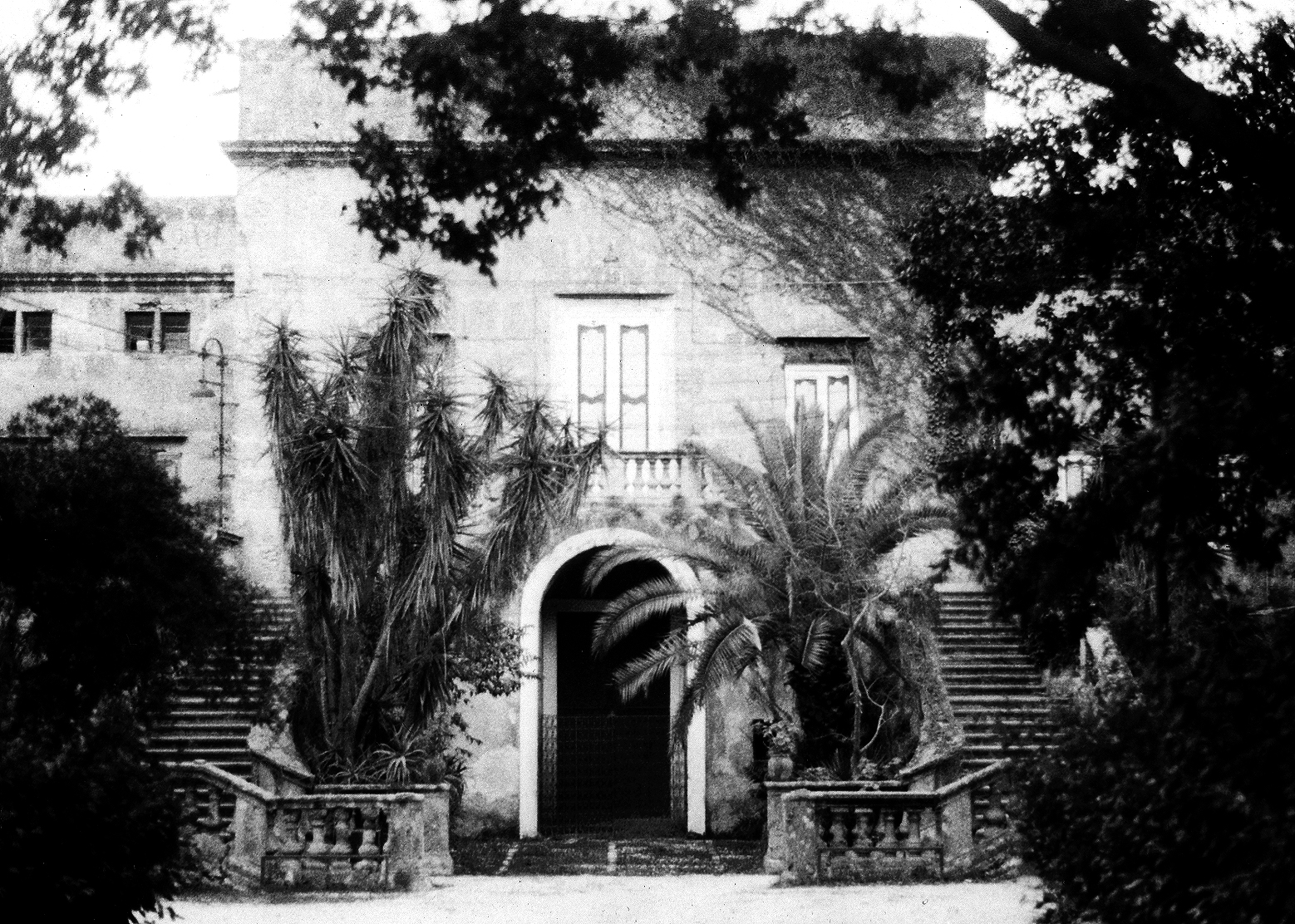
Villa Boscogrande, one of the film's primary locations.

Tomasi's novel was a bestseller in Italy and won the Strega Prize, Italy's most prestigious literary award. In August 1960, Italian studio Titanus announced they would make a film based on the novel in Sicily the following summer on a budget of at least $2 million. The film was to be an Italian-American co-production, shot in various languages, with a combination of Italian and American stars. Ettore Giannini was preparing a script, although it was expected he would collaborate with another writer to finish it.

Several treatments were reportedly done before Visconti became involved. "The book is seen through the eyes of a Sicilian prince who has no sense of the people", said Visconti. "The people were fooled by Garibaldi and then they were destroyed by the Piedmontese. The popular conscience was strangled by the way the Piedmont upper class tried to keep the social structure of the south just as it was."

In July 1961, MGM announced they had signed a co-production deal with Titanus to make the movie. Warren Beatty was in discussions with Visconti to play Tancredi, while Visconti approached Laurence Olivier and Spencer Tracy to play the Prince.

Visconti was told by producers that they needed to cast a star in order to ensure they would earn enough money to justify the big budget. The producers recommended that the star should be either Gregory Peck, Anthony Quinn, Spencer Tracy, or Burt Lancaster, and chose Lancaster without consulting Visconti. This insulted the director, which caused tension on the set initially, but Visconti and Lancaster ended up working well together, and their resulting friendship lasted the rest of Visconti's life.

In November 1961, Lancaster agreed to play the lead role, with filming to start in April. Lancaster said he had been "long fascinated" with The Leopard, even before being offered the role, saying: "I think it is the best written and most perceptive study of a man and his background that has appeared for many years." He said he had doubts about accepting the part because "the novel was so perfect as a novel", but, ultimately, decided to accept. Claudia Cardinale and Delon had made Rocco and His Brothers with Visconti.

In April 1962, 20th Century Fox announced it had bought the film's distribution rights.

=== Shooting ===
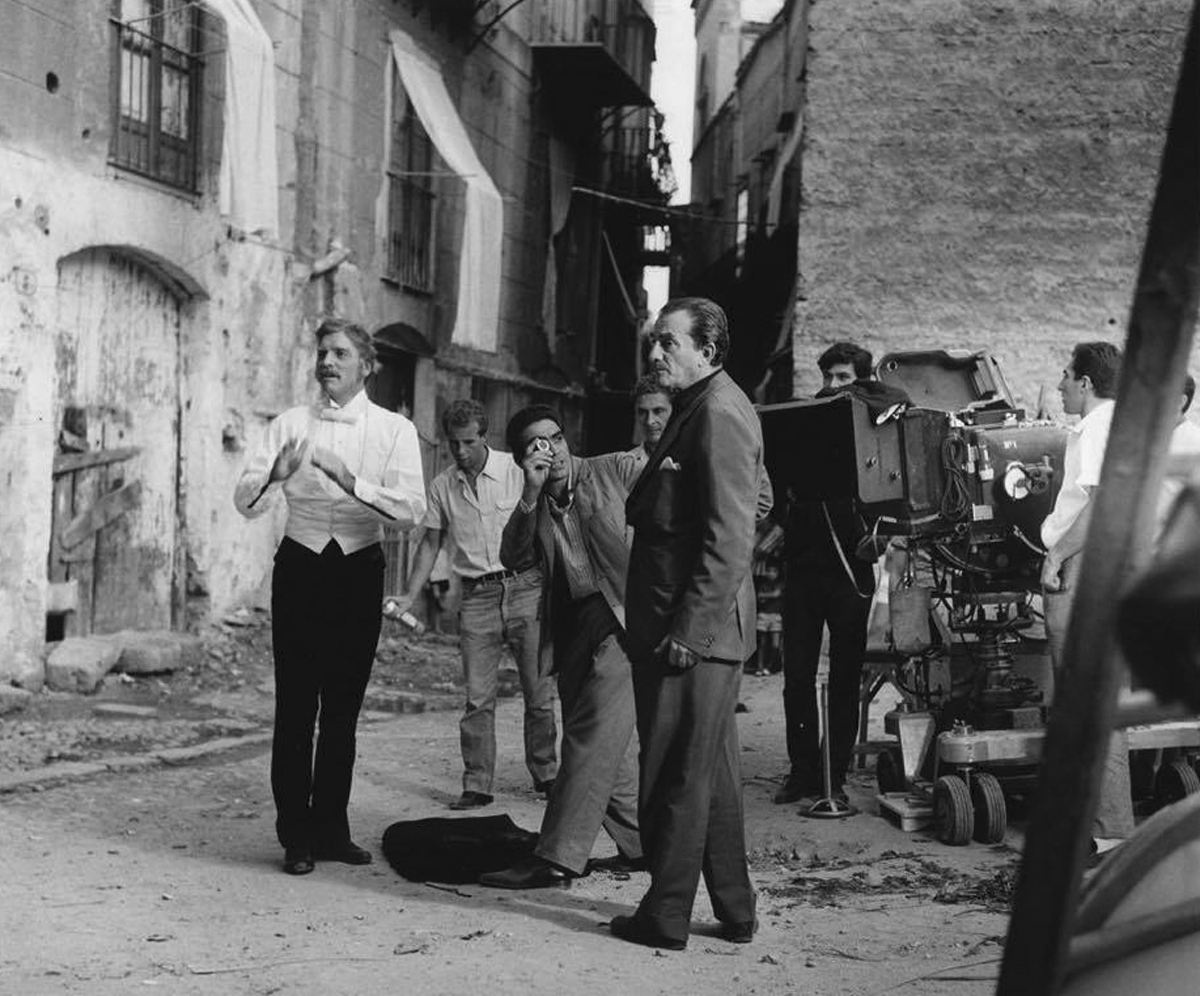
Visconti and Lancaster behind the scenes

Filming started in May 1962 in Palermo. The first two weeks of the two-month location shoot in Sicily were dedicated to battle scenes. After 22 weeks of location scenes, interiors were shot in Rome. The film's climactic ball scene, which was shot in Palazzo Valguarnera-Gangi in Palermo, became famous for its duration (it runs for over 46 minutes in the completed film) and opulence.

Lancaster called Visconti "the finest director I've ever worked with." The scenes with Lancaster were shot in English and dubbed into Italian for the Italian version of the film, while most of the other scenes were filmed in Italian and dubbed into English for the English version. Lancaster was dubbed by Corrado Gaipa, and his French co-star Alain Delon was dubbed by Carlo Sabatini. Archibald Colquhoun worked as the film's dialogue director. The French version was written by René Barjavel.

By May 1963, it was reported the film had cost Titanus $5 million.

== Versions ==
The Leopard has circulated in at least five different versions. Visconti's initial workprint was 205 minutes long, but both the director and producer felt it was too long, and the film was shortened to 195 minutes for its premiere at the Cannes Film Festival. Visconti then cut the film further—to 185 minutes—for its official Italian release, and considered this version to be his preferred one. In other European countries, the film was released in a 171-minute cut.

=== English 1963 version ===
Twentieth Century-Fox distributed the movie in both England and the United States, making several significant alterations. They replaced Visconti's vivid Technicolor images with the far inferior DeLuxe Color process and downgraded the film from 70mm to 35mm. Additionally, they cut several key scenes, further reducing the runtime from 185 to 161 minutes.

The dubbing was also poorly executed, with issues in the translation, the voices and the synchronization. In contrast, other Italian films of the time, such as those by Riccardo Freda and Vittorio Cottafavi, were carefully dubbed. Burt Lancaster and supporting actor Leslie French were the only ones who re-dubbed their own dialogue. Critics deemed the dubbing as awful.

The result of these changes was a significantly inferior product. As a consequence, the movie was poorly received by both critics and audiences in the US and England, unlike with the rest of Europe where it was well received.

Visconti himself had no control on any of these changes. He threatened to sue Fox, who threatened to counter-sue the director, arguing that Lancaster supervised the American cut. "I don't feel it's my film at all," Visconti said of this version. It is little surprise, therefore, that he has disavowed the English version of The Leopard and refuses to take any responsibility for it at all.

=== English 1983 version ===
The 1983 print is a product of Fox's newly established 'classics division'. It is the 185-minute intermediate version approved by Visconti for international release. The Italian soundtrack has been restored, and the color has been enhanced to resemble the original Technicolor hues, which are now technically unreproducible. This version was received much more favorably by critics.

In 2004, a restored version was released by Fox.

== Release ==
The film debuted at the 1963 Cannes Film Festival, where it won the Palme d'Or.

The 185-minute version of the film was finally released in the U.S. in 1983.

=== Preservation ===
The original 8-perforation Technirama camera negative for The Leopard survives and was used by The Criterion Collection to create their video master for DVD and Blu-ray, with color timing supervised by the film's cinematographer, Giuseppe Rotunno. New preservation film elements were created using a 4K digital scan of the film, done with the cooperation of the Cineteca di Bologna, L'Immagine Ritrovata, The Film Foundation, Gucci, Pathé, Fondation Jérôme Seydoux-Pathé, Twentieth Century Fox, and Centro Sperimentale di Cinematografia-Cineteca Nazionale. This restoration premiered at the 2010 Cannes Film Festival.

=== Home media ===
There are several DVD editions of the film available:

- Region 2 (Italy) The Medusa Home Entertainment release (released in 2001) contains the 185-minute Italian version with several bonus features and interviews. (This release is not English-friendly.)
- Region 2 (U.K.) The BFI Video release offers a restored version of the Italian cut with an audio commentary by David Forgacs and Rossana Capitano.
- Region 2 (Japan) The Toho release contains an unrestored version of the Italian cut with both the original audio (and Japanese subtitles), and a rare alternative English dubbed track that is different from that of the shortened U.S. version of the film. Special features include text-based bios and facts in Japanese. (This release is not English-friendly.)
- Region 1 (U.S.) The Criterion Collection release is a 3-disc set containing a restored version of the 185-minute Italian version (with optional English subtitles), several bonus features, interviews, an audio commentary by Peter Cowie, and the 161-minute U.S. English-dubbed version as an extra.

Blu-ray release:

- Region A (U.S.) The Criterion Collection 2-disc Blu-ray set boasts a transfer of the 185-min Italian version in 1080P, most of the DVD bonus materials, some newly created bonus materials, and the 161-minute U.S. English-dubbed version in 1080i.

== Reception ==
=== Box office ===
The film was successful in Europe. It grossed $370,000 in its first ten days of release in eight Italian cities, and was the sixth most popular film of the year at the French box office, with 3,688,024 admissions. Due to the poor quality cut for U.S. release by Fox, the film did not perform as well in the United States, with theatrical rentals of $1.8 million.

=== Critical response ===
The Leopard was well received in Europe, winning the 1963 Palme d'Or at Cannes and achieving both critical and commercial success.

Due to Fox's poor English version, at the time of its release in the summer of 1963, the majority of American critics panned the film. According to Newsweek, Lancaster looked "as if he's playing Clarence Day's Life with Father in summer stock." Jonathan Miller of The New Yorker derided Lancaster as "muzzled by whiskers and clearly stunned by the importance of his role." However, Time Magazine praised Lancaster's characterization of the Leopard as solid and convincing.

The 1983 release, featuring its restored 185-minute runtime and Italian soundtrack, received a more favorable response from critics. New York magazine called the now-famous ballroom scene "almost unbearably moving." The New York Times wrote: "The reappearance of this enchanting work proves that, under the right circumstances, two decades make no difference whatsoever but 25 minutes can transform a very good film into a possibly great one."

After seeing the 1983 re-release in full, critic for The New Yorker, Pauline Kael wrote: "It's deeply satisfying to see [The Leopard] in its full length" and goes on to call it a "sweeping popular epic" and that it is "so beautifully felt that it calls up a whole culture. It casts an intelligent spell, intelligent and rapturous."

After the 2004 release, the Washington Post praised the film, saying it 'was from a time “when epics looked like epics”, that “the movie all but weeps with a sense of emotional loss” and “we have the sublime satisfaction of a first-time experience with a yesteryear classic”.'

=== Retrospective reviews ===
Mark Lager, on Senses of Cinema, praised Giuseppe Rotunno's cinematography in the film as "baroque and elegiac" and "groundbreaking and reflective".

The film's reputation continues to rise. Directors Martin Scorsese and Sydney Pollack (who had supervised the English-dubbing of the film) consider it to be one of the greatest ever made. In the decennial poll of critics made by the British Film Institute, The Leopard was named the 57th greatest film of all time.

On review aggregator website Rotten Tomatoes, the film holds an approval rating of 98% based on 50 reviews, with an average score of 9.1/10; the site's "critics consensus" reads: "Lavish and wistful, The Leopard features epic battles, sumptuous costumes, and a ballroom waltz that competes for most beautiful sequence committed to film." On Metacritic, the 2004 re-release of the film holds a perfect 100 out of 100 score based on 12 reviews, indicating "universal acclaim".

The film was included by the Vatican in a list of important films compiled in 1995, under the category of "Art".

== Accolades ==
Institution	Year	Category	Nominee(s)	Result
Academy Awards	1964	Best Costume Design, Color	Piero Tosi	Nominated
Cannes Film Festival	1963	Palme d'Or	Luchino Visconti	Won
David di Donatello	1963	Best Producer	Goffredo Lombardo	Nominated
Golden Globe Awards	1964	New Star of the Year – Actor	Alain Delon	Nominated
Nastro d'Argento	1964	Best Director	Luchino Visconti	Nominated
Nastro d'Argento	1964	Best Supporting Actor	Romolo Valli	Nominated
Nastro d'Argento	1964	Best Supporting Actress	Rina Morelli	Nominated
Nastro d'Argento	1964	Best Screenplay	Luchino Visconti, Suso Cecchi d'Amico, Enrico Medioli, Pasquale Festa Campanile, Massimo Franciosa	Nominated
Nastro d'Argento	1964	Best Cinematography, Color	Giuseppe Rotunno	Won
Nastro d'Argento	1964	Best Production Design	Mario Garbuglia	Won
Nastro d'Argento	1964	Best Costume Design	Piero Tosi	Won
National Board of Review	1963	Top Foreign Films	The Leopard	Won
Sant Jordi Awards	1964	Best Foreign Film	Luchino Visconti	Won
Sant Jordi Awards	1991	Special Award	Luchino Visconti	Won

== Television series ==
A 5-part streaming television miniseries based on the novel, was released on Netflix on 5 March 2025.
