= Knights of the Desert (film) =

- Directed by: Gino Talamo; Osvaldo Valenti
- Written by: Emilio Salgari (novel); Vittorio Mussolini; Federico Fellini
- Starring: Osvaldo Valenti; Luisa Ferida; Luigi Pavese; Guido Celano
- Cinematography: Angelo Jannarelli
- Music by: Renzo Rossellini
- Production company: Alleanza Cinematografica Italiana
- Release date: 1942
- Country: Italy
- Language: Italian

Knights of the Desert (Italian: I cavalieri del deserto) is a 1942 Italian adventure film directed by Gino Talamo and Osvaldo Valenti. It starred Valenti, Luisa Ferida and Luigi Pavese. The film was based on a novel by Emilio Salgari with a screenplay by Federico Fellini and Vittorio Mussolini, the son of Italy's dictator Benito Mussolini. It was produced by the Rome-based ACI which was run by Vittorio Mussolini. Valenti and Ferida were romantically linked, and co-starred in several films together.

The film was shot on location in Libya, before the North African Campaign turned decisively against Italy and its Allies. Fellini may have directed some of the Libyan scenes after Gino Talamo was injured in a car accident. The film was ultimately never released due to the defeats suffered in Libya, which meant its plot was now a potential embarrassment to the regime.

== Cast ==
- Osvaldo Valenti as Il capitano Serra
- Luisa Ferida as Ara
- Luigi Pavese as El-Burnì
- Guido Celano
- Piero Lulli
- Erminio Spalla
- Primo Carnera
