= Gino Cervi =

Italian actor (1901–1974)

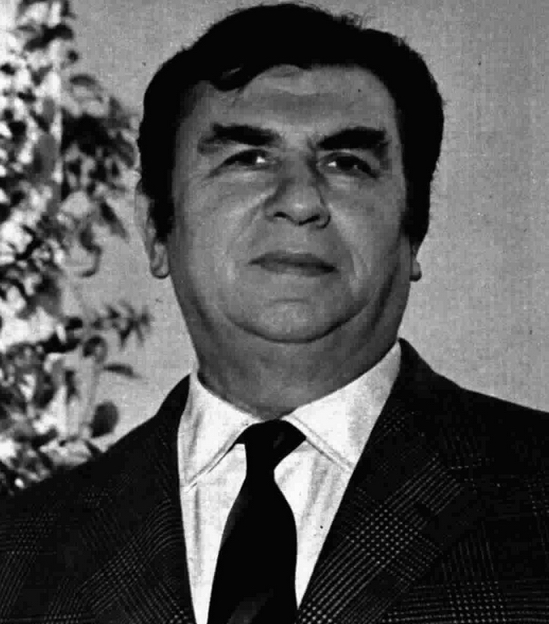
- Cervi in 1970
- Born: Luigi Cervi; 3 May 1901; Bologna, Kingdom of Italy
- Died: 3 January 1974 (aged 72); Punta Ala, Grosseto, Italy
- Resting place: Cimitero Flaminio, Rome
- Occupation: Actor
- Years active: 1925–1972
- Spouse: Ninì Gordini (m. 1928)
- Children: Tonino Cervi
- Relatives: Valentina Cervi (granddaughter)

Luigi "Gino" Cervi (Italian pronunciation: [ˈdʒiːno ˈtʃɛrvi]; 3 May 1901 – 3 January 1974) was an Italian actor. He was best known for portraying Peppone in a series of comedies based on the character Don Camillo (1952–1965), and police detective Jules Maigret on the television series Le inchieste del commissario Maigret (1964–1972).

== Life and career ==
Cervi was born in Bologna as Luigi Cervi. His father was Antonio Cervi, a theatre critic for Il Resto del Carlino. His family held close ties to the town of Casalbuttano ed Uniti, where the elder Cervi would eventually be buried.

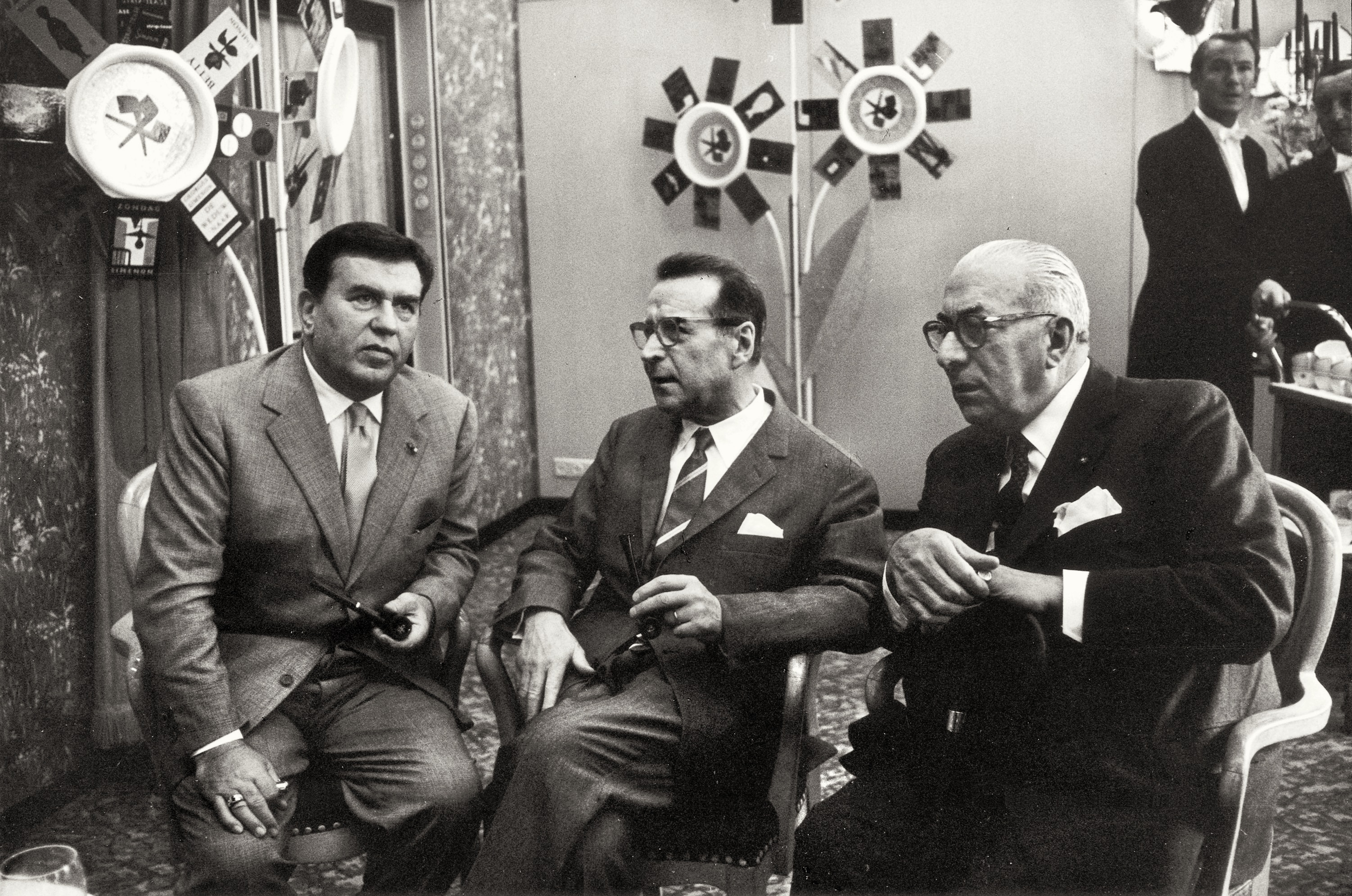
Cervi (left) with the Belgian author Georges Simenon and the Italian publisher Arnoldo Mondadori

He was best known for his role of Giuseppe Bottazzi ("Peppone"), the Communist mayor in the Don Camillo movies of the 1950s and the 1960s. He shared great understanding and friendship with co-star Fernandel during the 15 years playing their respective roles in Don Camillo movies. He was a stage actor, particularly known for his interpretations of Shakespeare, and co-founded the Teatro Eliseo's stable company with Paolo Stoppa and Rina Morelli in 1939.

Toward the end of his career he played Commissioner Maigret for eight years in the Italian TV adaptation of the series of crime novels by Georges Simenon, Le inchieste del commissario Maigret (1964–1972), during which he also starred in a spin-off movie Maigret a Pigalle (1966), produced by his son Tonino Cervi.

Cervi was also a voice actor, and dubbed into Italian the films of Laurence Olivier (Henry V, 1944; Hamlet, 1948; Richard III, 1955), Orson Welles, Clark Gable (It Happened One Night, 1934), and James Stewart (Harvey, 1950). He dubbed Alec Guinness' voice in the Italian version of Brother Sun, Sister Moon (1972) and Charles Boyer in Lucky to Be a Woman (1956).

== Personal life ==
In 1928, Cervi married actress Ninì Gordini and they had a son, Tonino Cervi. He later became the grandfather of actress Valentina Cervi and producer Antonio Levesi Cervi.

He was initiated to the Italian Scottish Rite Freemasonry in the Lodge "Palingenesi" (Rome, 1946) and later he joined the Lodge "Galvani" in Bologna.

As a young adult, Cervi was a supporter of the Fascist Party and participated in the March on Rome. His political alignment changed during World War II, when he openly denounced Fascism and far-right politics in general. He supported the Christian Democrats during the 1968 general election, and later joined the Italian Liberal Party, winning an election as councilor for the Lazio region.

== Death ==
Cervi died in Punta Ala in 1974.

== Selected filmography ==
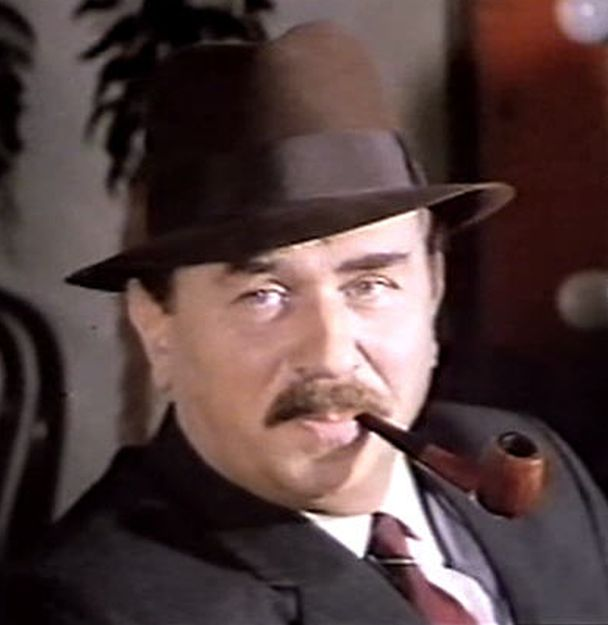
Gino Cervi in Maigret (1967).

- The Blue Fleet (1932)
- Frontiere (1934)
- The Two Sergeants (1936) - Commander Federico Martelli / Sergeant Guglielmo Salvoni
- Aldebaran (1936) - Cmdr. Corrado Valeri
- Amore (1936) - Paolo Venieri
- Gli uomini non sono ingrati (1937) - Ferencz Korvat
- I Want to Live with Letizia (1938) - Bebe
- L'argine (1938) - Zvanì
- Ettore Fieramosca (1938) - Ettore Fieramosca
- Inventiamo l'amore (1938) - Carlo Morelli
- The Sons of the Marquis Lucera (1939) - Ermanno
- Un'avventura di Salvator Rosa (1939) - Salvador Rosa, il "Formica"
- The Sinner (1940) - Alberto
- A Romantic Adventure (1940) - Luigi
- Eternal Melodies (1940) - Wolfgang Amadeus Mozart
- Il sogno di tutti (1940) - Baby's fathe
- The Iron Crown (1941) - King Sedemondo of Kindaor
- The Betrothed (1941) - Renzo Tramaglino
- L'ultimo addio (1942) - Doctor Gino Landi
- The Queen of Navarre (1942) - Carlo Vº
- Don Cesare di Bazan (1942) - Don Cesare of Bazan
- Torrents of Spring (1942) - Francesco
- Fourth Page (1942) - Former inmate
- Four Steps in the Clouds (1942) - Paolo Bianchi
- Gente dell'aria (1943) - Captain Pietro Sandri
- Sad Loves (1943) - Giulio Scarli
- I'll Always Love You (1943) - Mario Fabbrini
- The Innkeeper (1944) - The poet
- Vivere ancora (1945)
- Quartetto pazzo (1945) - Roberto
- What a Distinguished Family (1945) - Michele Montischi
- My Widow and I (1945) - Mr. Guglielmi
- His Young Wife (1945) - Knight Commander Francesco Battilocchio
- Un uomo ritorna (1946) - Sergio Tibaldi
- Malìa (1946) - Don Alfonso
- L'angelo e il diavolo (1946) - Giulio Serra
- Black Eagle (1946) - Kirila Petrovic
- Umanità (1946)
- Crime News (1947)
- Fury (1947) - Oreste
- Daniele Cortis (1947) - Elena's husband
- I miserabili (1948) - Jean Valjean
- Anna Karenina (1948) - Enrico
- Fabiola (1949) - Quadratus
- William Tell (1949) - William Tell
- The Flame That Will Not Die (1949) - Luigi Manfredi
- The Bride Can't Wait (1949) - Anselmo Brunelli
- Yvonne of the Night (1949) - Colonnel Baretti
- Il cielo è rosso (1950)
- The Cliff of Sin (1950) - Silvano
- Women Without Names (1950) - MP Sergeant Pietro Zanini
- Story of a Love Affair (1950)
- Red Seal (1950)
- Il caimano del Piave (1951) - Colonel of Torrebruna
- The Forbidden Christ (1951) - The Sexton
- Cameriera bella presenza offresi... (1951) - Filiberto 'Berto' Morucchi
- O.K. Nerone (1951) - Nero
- Hello Elephant (1952) - Narrator
- Don Camillo (1952) - Giuseppe 'Peppone' Bottazzi
- Wife For a Night (1952) - Count D'Origo
- Three Forbidden Stories (1952) - Prof. Aragona (Third segment)
- The Queen of Sheba (1952) - King Solomon of Jerusalem
- La scogliera del peccato (1952)
- The Lady Without Camelias (1953) - Ercole 'Ercolino' Borra
- Terminal Station (1953) - Police commissioner
- The Return of Don Camillo (1953) - Giuseppe 'Peppone' Bottazzi
- Nero and the Burning of Rome (1953) - Nero
- The Three Musketeers (1953) - Porthos
- The Lady of the Camellias (1953) - Monsieur Duval
- Cavallina storna (1953) - Ruggero Pascoli
- Royal Affairs in Versailles (1954) - Cagliostro
- Maddalena (1954) - Don Vincenzo
- Cardinal Lambertini (1954) - Cardinal Lambertini
- A Free Woman (1954) - Knight Commander Massimo Marchi
- La grande avventura (1954)
- Farewell, My Beautiful Lady (1954) - Count Riccardo Salluzzo
- Frou-Frou (1955) - Prince Vladimir Bilinsky
- Non c'è amore più grande (1955)
- Don Camillo's Last Round (1955) - Giuseppe 'Peppone' Bottazzi
- Il coraggio (1955) - Comm. Aristide Paoloni
- Wild Love (1956) - Sor Cesare
- Guardia, guardia scelta, brigadiere e maresciallo (1956) - Marshall
- Beatrice Cenci (1956) - Francesco Cenci
- Wives and Obscurities (1956) - John Cattabriga
- Desert Warrior (1957) - Ibrahim
- Trapped in Tangier (1957) - Prof. Bolevasco
- Le belle dell'aria (1957) - Don Fogazza
- Amore e chiacchiere (Salviamo il panorama) (1958) - Paseroni
- El pasado te acusa (1958) - Comisario
- Sans famille (1958) - Vitalis
- The Naked Maja (1958) - King Carlos IV of Spain
- Nel Segno di Roma (1959) - Aurelianus - Emperor of Rome
- The Big Chief (1959) - Paulo
- The Black Chapel (1959) - Police commissioner Ferrari
- Vacations in Majorca (1959) - André Breton
- The Employee (1960) - King Lear (uncredited)
- David and Goliath (1960) - King Saul (voice, uncredited)
- Siege of Syracuse (1960) - Gerome
- Mistress of the World (1960) - Professor Johanson
- Long Night in 1943 (1960) - Carlo Aretusi aka "Sciagura"
- Le olimpiadi dei mariti (1960) - Director of the newspaper
- Femmine di lusso (1960) - Comm. Lemeni, Ugo's father
- The Revolt of the Slaves (1960) - Fabio
- Un figlio d'oggi (1961) - Andrea
- The Joy of Living (1961) - Olinto Fossati
- Don Camillo: Monsignor (1961) - Giuseppe 'Peppone' Bottazzi
- The Orderly (1961) - Major Penna
- Ten Italians for One German (1962) - Duke Alfonso di San Severino
- Roaring Years (1962) - Podestà Salvatore Acquamano
- La monaca di Monza (1962) - Cardinale Borromeo
- Le Crime ne paie pas (1962) - L'inquisiteur (segment "Le masque")
- The Changing of the Guard (1962) - Mario Vinicio
- Avventura al motel (1963) - Knight Commander
- The Shortest Day (1963) - Colonel Daini
- The Eye of the Needle (1963) - D'Angelo - lawyer
- Gli onorevoli (1963) - Senator Rossani Braschi
- Le Bon Roi Dagobert (1963) - Le ministre saint-eloi
- Full Hearts and Empty Pockets (1964) - Botta
- Becket (1964) - the Cardinal / Cardinal Zambelli
- Don Camillo in Moscow (1965) - Giuseppe 'Peppone' Bottazzi
- Maigret a Pigalle (1966) - Jules Maigret
- Gli altri, gli altri... e noi (1967)
- Fratello ladro (1972) - Don Lino
- Uccidere in silenzio (1972) - Nono Devoto
- I racconti romani di una ex novizia (1973) - (final film role)

== Bibliography ==
- (in Italian) Mauro Manciotti, Un attore per amico. Omaggio a Gino Cervi, Comune di Borgio Verezzi (SV), Borgio Verezzi, 1999.
- (in Italian) Andrea Maioli, Rino Maenza, Cervi 100. Peppone, Maigret e gli altri, Medianova, Bologna, 2001.
- (in Italian) Andrea Derchi, Marco Biggio, Gino Cervi: attore protagonista del '900, ERGA Edizioni, Genova, 2002. ISBN 8881632381.
- (in Italian) Riccardo F. Esposito, Don Camillo e Peppone. Cronache cinematografiche dalla Bassa Padana 1951–1965, Le Mani – Microart's, Recco, 2008. ISBN 9788880124559.
