= William Tell (1949 film) =

- Italian: Guglielmo Tell
- Directed by: Giorgio Pastina; Michał Waszyński
- Written by: Friedrich Schiller (play); Giuseppe Zucca; Giorgio Pastini
- Produced by: Giorgio Venturini
- Starring: Gino Cervi; Monique Orban; Paul Muller; Raf Pindi
- Cinematography: Arturo Gallea; Giovanni Ventimiglia
- Edited by: Loris Bellero
- Production company: Fauno Film
- Release date: 8 April 1949
- Running time: 91 minutes
- Country: Italy
- Language: Italian

William Tell (Italian: Guglielmo Tell) is a 1949 Italian historical drama film directed by Giorgio Pastina and Michał Waszyński and starring Gino Cervi, Monique Orban and Paul Muller. The film is based on Friedrich Schiller's 1804 play of the same title, which portrays the adventures of William Tell in his fight for Swiss independence. The film was produced by the Milan-based Fauno Film.

== Cast ==
- Gino Cervi as Guglielmo Tell
- Monique Orban as Berta - la castellana
- Paul Muller as Gessler, the bailiff
- Raf Pindi as Rudolf the Harra
- Allegra Sander as Mathilde
- Gabriele Ferzetti as Corrado Hant
- Danielle Benson as Hedwig Tell
- Renato De Carmine as Bertrando
- Emilio Baldanello
- Enrico Olivieri as William Tell
- Laura Bigi
- Aldo Nicodemi as Rudens
- Barbara Deperusse as Wife of a lumberjack
- Giovanni Lovatelli
- Alberto Collo
