= Red Seal (film) =

1950 film

- Directed by: Flavio Calzavara
- Written by: Giuseppe Zucca; Giuseppe Mangione; Flavio Calzavara
- Produced by: Eugenio Fontana
- Starring: Gino Cervi; Carla Del Poggio; Adriano Rimoldi
- Cinematography: Giuseppe Caracciolo
- Edited by: Giancarlo Cappelli
- Music by: Franco Casavola
- Production company: Produzioni Fontana
- Distributed by: ENIC; Regionale
- Release date: 1950
- Running time: 91 minutes
- Country: Italy
- Language: Italian

Red Seal (Italian: Sigillo rosso) is a 1950 Italian crime film directed by Flavio Calzavara and starring Gino Cervi, Carla Del Poggio and Adriano Rimoldi.

The film's sets were designed by the art director Alberto Boccianti. It was not a commercial success, earning around 28 million lira at the box office.

== Synopsis ==
After her only son is killed fighting during the Second World War, an elderly widow turns her home into a boarding house to make ends meet. Several of the guests are hunting for a mysterious document, bound with a red seal, entrusted to her by her son.

== Cast ==
- Gino Cervi
- Carla Del Poggio
- Adriano Rimoldi
- Linda Sini
- Giovanna Scotto
- Miranda Campa
- Fulvia Mammi
- Gabriele Ferzetti
- Lia Corelli

== Bibliography ==
- Chiti, Roberto & Poppi, Roberto. Dizionario del cinema italiano: Dal 1945 al 1959. Gremese Editore, 1991.
