= I Met You in Naples =

1946 film

- Directed by: Pietro Francisci
- Written by: Riccardo Morbelli; Evelina Levi; John Ford; Pietro Francisci
- Starring: Anna Nievo; Leo Dale; Peppino De Filippo; Claudio Gora
- Cinematography: Augusto Tiezzi
- Edited by: Pietro Francisci
- Music by: Nuccio Fiorda
- Production company: Edi Film
- Release date: 20 April 1946
- Running time: 74 minutes
- Country: Italy
- Language: Italian

I Met You in Naples (Italian: Io t'ho incontrata a Napoli) is a 1946 Italian musical melodrama film directed by Pietro Francisci and starring Anna Nievo, Leo Dale and Peppino De Filippo. The film takes its name from a popular song of the same title. It is part of the neorealist trend in post-Second World War Italian films.

== Synopsis ==
An American soldier and a young Italian aspiring actress meet in wartime Naples in 1944. They fall in love and eventually marry. At the end of the film she emigrates to the United States with him, hoping to be able to pursue her career there.

== Cast ==
- Anna Nievo as Angela l'attrice
- Leo Dale as ufficiale americano
- Peppino De Filippo
- Giuseppe Porelli
- Claudio Gora
- Paolo Stoppa
- Lola Braccini
- William Bye
- Nino Pavese
- Massimo Sallusti
- Renzo Giovampietro

== Bibliography ==
- Cardullo, Bert. André Bazin and Italian Neorealism. Bloomsbury Publishing, 2011.
- Moliterno, Gino. The A to Z of Italian Cinema. Scarecrow Press, 2009.
