= An Adventure of Salvator Rosa =

1939 film by Alessandro Blasetti

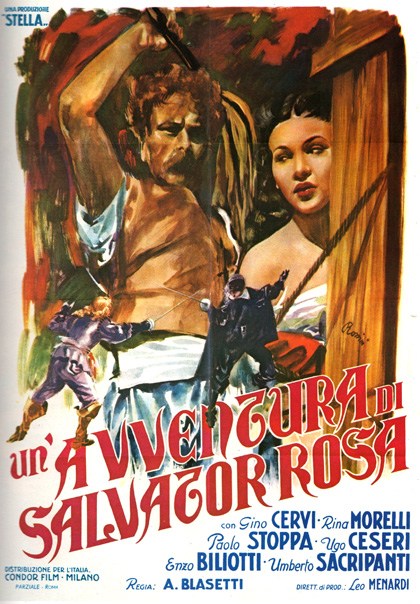
- Directed by: Alessandro Blasetti
- Written by: Alessandro Blasetti; Renato Castellani; Corrado Pavolini; Ugo Scotti Berni; Giuseppe Zucca
- Produced by: Andrea Di Robilant; Augusto Turati
- Starring: Gino Cervi; Luisa Ferida; Rina Morelli; Osvaldo Valenti
- Cinematography: Václav Vích
- Edited by: Mario Serandrei; Alessandro Blasetti
- Music by: Alessandro Cicognini
- Production company: Stella Film
- Distributed by: ENIC
- Release date: 16 December 1939
- Running time: 97 minutes
- Country: Italy
- Language: Italian

An Adventure of Salvator Rosa (Italian: Un'avventura di Salvator Rosa) is a 1939 Italian historical adventure film directed by Alessandro Blasetti and starring Gino Cervi, Luisa Ferida and Rina Morelli. It is set in seventeenth century Naples, then occupied by Spain, where a famous artist celebrated for his paintings of the rich leads a double life as a secret defender of the poor and oppressed.

It was shot at the Cinecittà Studios in Rome. The film's sets were designed by the art director Virgilio Marchi.

At the time of its release, the film was greeted with unanimous critical approval. Giuseppe Isani, on Cinema, referred to it as "the best Italian film produced from 1930 onwards."

== Plot ==
Kingdom of Naples, 17th century. Spanish oppression becomes increasingly bloody after the popular uprising led by Masaniello. The famous painter Salvator Rosa is also a masked hero who fights against the arrogance and oppression that the nobles impose on the poorer classes: the notorious ‘Formica,’ a friend of the people, a skilled swordsman and a daring inventor of hoaxes against the viceroy of Naples and Count Lamberto, his adviser.

In Torniano, where he goes to find some rest from his labors, Rosa, there too, is confronted by the arrogance of Count Lamberto, who not only aspires to the hand of the capricious duchess, but oppresses the peasants of the contado. He thus resumes the mask of Formica and begins a dangerous game to beat the count; with cunning and incredible actions, he succeeds in saving many peasants from the gallows and also in foiling the marriage hated by the people, between the duchess of Torniano (much fascinated by Formica) and Count Lamberto; at the same time, he must succeed in retaining the trust of the suspicious peasants, but the dexterity of his plan and the skill of his fencing technique lead him to victory.

The peasant girl Lucrezia, a great supporter of Formica and in love with Salvator Rosa, discovers only at the end that behind the mask of the defender of the people’s rights is precisely the painter she loved.

== Cast ==
- Gino Cervi as Salvator Rosa / Il Formica
- Luisa Ferida as Lucrezia
- Rina Morelli as Isabella di Torniano
- Osvaldo Valenti as conte Lamberto D'Arco
- Ugo Ceseri as Giuseppe
- Umberto Sacripante as contadino
- Pietro Pastore as contadino
- Mario Mazza (actor) as contadino
- Paolo Stoppa as contadino
- Carlo Duse as ufficiale di palazzo a Napoli
- Enzo Biliotti as Viceroy of Naples
- Jone Salinas as Amalia
- Umberto Sclanizza as Il primo contadino
- Gino Massi as Ciccillo
- Leone Papa as Il carceriere
- Rudi Dal Pra as Simone (uncredited)

== Bibliography ==
- Sorlin, Pierre (2006). Italian National Cinema. New York: Routledge. ISBN 978-1-13-481777-1.
