= Fedora (1942 film) =

1942 film directed by Camillo Mastrocinque

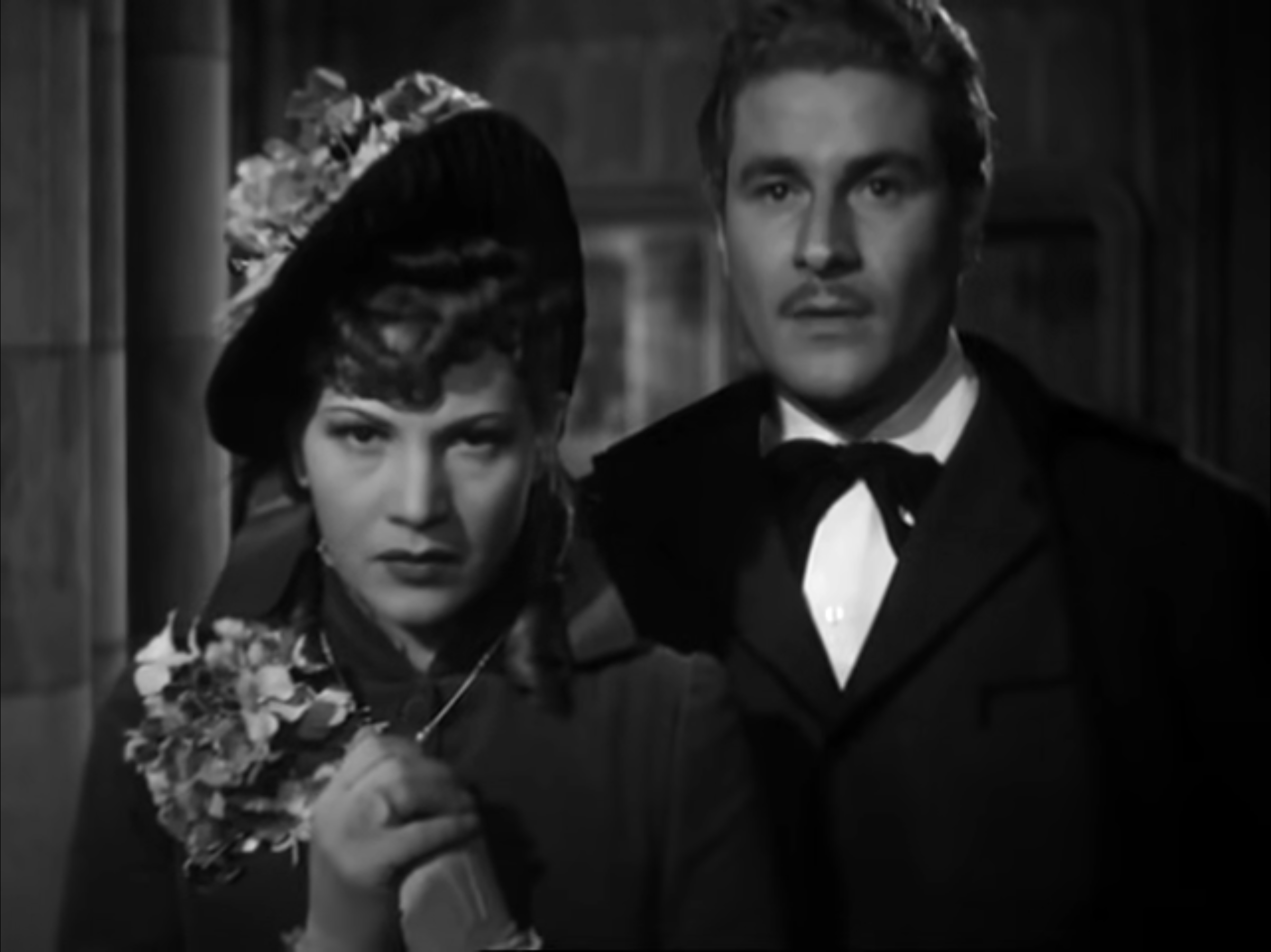
- Ferida and Nazzari in a film scene
- Directed by: Camillo Mastrocinque
- Written by: Victorien Sardou (play); Camillo Mastrocinque; Pier Luigi Melani; Cesare Morgante; Giorgio Pastina
- Produced by: Alfredo Proia
- Starring: Luisa Ferida; Amedeo Nazzari; Osvaldo Valenti
- Cinematography: Mario Albertelli; Giuseppe La Torre
- Edited by: Duilio A. Lucarelli
- Music by: Umberto Giordano
- Production company: Industrie Cinematografiche Artistiche Romane
- Distributed by: Generalcine
- Release date: 12 September 1942
- Running time: 90 minutes
- Country: Italy
- Language: Italian

Fedora is a 1942 Italian historical drama film directed by Camillo Mastrocinque and starring Luisa Ferida, Amedeo Nazzari and Osvaldo Valenti. It is based on the 1882 play of the same title by Victorien Sardou.

The film's sets were designed by the art director Ottavio Scotti. It was shot at the Cinecittà Studios in Rome.

== Synopsis ==
In the Russian Empire during the 1870s, after her prospective groom is assassinated on her wedding day Princess Fedora vows revenge on the killer. In Paris, she meets and falls in love with an artist, before realising that he is the assassin. After reporting him to the Russian secret police, she comes to understand his reasons for doing what he did.

== Cast ==
- Luisa Ferida as Fedora
- Amedeo Nazzari as Loris Ipanov / Ivan Petrovic
- Osvaldo Valenti as Vladimiro Yariskine
- Memo Benassi as Il principe Yariskine
- Rina Morelli as Olga Soukarev
- Sandro Ruffini as De Sirieux
- Annibale Betrone as Boroff
- Augusto Marcacci as Gretch
- Nerio Bernardi as Il pianista Boleslao Lazinsky
- Guido Celano as Cirillo
- Mirza Capanna as Marka
- Fedele Gentile as Il primo servo di casa Yariskine
- Nino Marchesini as Il secondo servo di casa Yariskine
- Elio Marcuzzo as Il giovane servitore
- Alfredo Martinelli as Basilio
- Beatrice Negri as Elisa, la modella
- Cesare Polacco as L'usuraio Barnstein
- Dina Romano as La padrona di casa di Boroff
- Alfredo Varelli as Valeriano

== Bibliography ==
- Roberto Chiti & Roberto Poppi. I film: Tutti i film italiani dal 1930 al 1944. Gremese Editore, 2005.
