= Le olimpiadi dei mariti =

- Directed by: Giorgio Bianchi
- Written by: Vittorio Metz; Roberto Gianviti
- Produced by: Dario Sabatello
- Starring: Ugo Tognazzi; Delia Scala; Raimondo Vianello; Sandra Mondaini
- Cinematography: Alvaro Mancori
- Music by: Carlo Rustichelli
- Release date: 1960
- Country: Italy
- Language: Italian

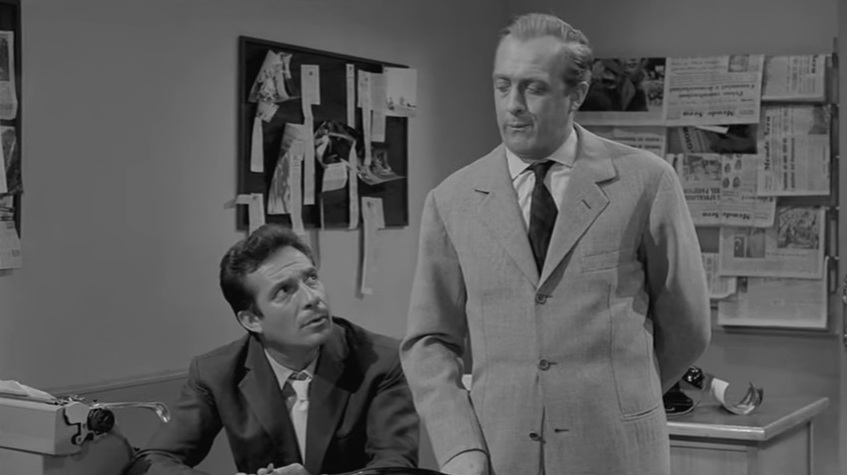
screenshot

Le olimpiadi dei mariti (Husbands' Olympics) is a 1960 Italian comedy film directed by Giorgio Bianchi.

== Cast ==
- Ugo Tognazzi: Ugo
- Raimondo Vianello: Raimondo
- Delia Scala: Delia
- Sandra Mondaini: Sandra
- Gino Cervi: Director of the newspaper
- Hélène Chanel: Helke
- Anna Rasmussen: Greta
- Andrea Rapisarda: Colonel von Gruber
- Francis Blanche
- Ernesto Calindri
- Lola Braccini
- Toni Ucci: Waiter
