= The Iron Crown =

1941 film by Alessandro Blasetti

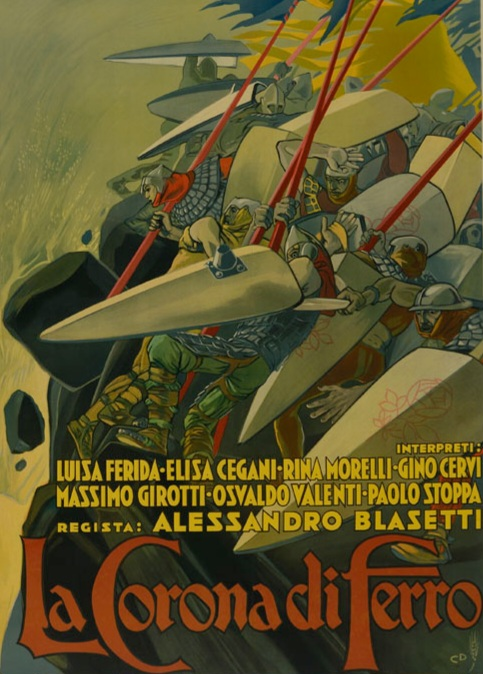
- Directed by: Alessandro Blasetti
- Written by: Alessandro Blasetti; Renato Castellani; Corrado Pavolini; Guglielmo Zorzi; Giuseppe Zucca
- Starring: Massimo Girotti; Gino Cervi
- Cinematography: Mario Craveri; Václav Vích
- Edited by: Mario Serandrei
- Music by: Alessandro Cicognini
- Distributed by: Lux film
- Release date: September 1941
- Running time: 97 minutes
- Country: Italy
- Language: Italian

The Iron Crown (Italian: La corona di ferro) is a 1941 Italian historical fantasy film written and directed by Alessandro Blasetti, starring Massimo Girotti and Gino Cervi. The narrative revolves a sacred iron crown and a king who is prophesied to lose his kingdom to his nephew. It blends motifs from several European myths, legends and modern works of popular fiction. The film won a Coppa Mussolini award, which is the ancestor to the Golden Lion.

== Plot ==
Upon the death of Licinio (Massimo Girotti), his brother Sedemondo (Gino Cervi) succeeds him as king of Kindaor. A messenger bearing a crown made from a nail from the True Cross requests permission to pass through the kingdom. The crown by legend will stay wherever injustice and corruption prevail. Sedemondo takes it to a gorge where it is swallowed by the earth.

A wise woman prophesies to the king that his wife will bear a daughter and Licinio's widow (Elisa Cegani) a son, that the two will fall in love, and the son take the kingdom from Sedemondo. When he gets home, he is told that his wife has given birth to a boy (the daughter having been switched with the child of Licinio) and so believes the prophecy to be invalid. He raises both the boy Arminio and girl Elsa. After some strife between Sedemondo and Arminio, the king orders Arminio to be taken to the gorge and slain.

Twenty years later, with Arminio (Massimo Girotti) having grown up in the forest, Sedemondo arranges a tournament to determine who will marry Elsa (Elisa Cegani). Tundra (Luisa Ferida) leads the resistance among the people against the king. The tournament, with various characters attending in disguise, sets up whether the prophecy will come to pass.

== Cast ==
- Elisa Cegani as the mother of Elsa & Elsa
- Luisa Ferida as Kavaora, mother of Tundra & Tundra
- Rina Morelli as the wise old woman
- Gino Cervi as Sedemondo, the king of Kindaor
- Massimo Girotti as Licinio & Arminio, his son
- Osvaldo Valenti as Eriberto
- Paolo Stoppa as Trifilli
- Primo Carnera as Klasa, the servant of Tundra
- Dina Perbellini as Elsa's nurse

Dubbing

- Gualtiero De Angelis ... voice dubbing: Massimo Girotti, role of "Arminio" only (uncredited)
- Lauro Gazzolo ... voice dubbing: Osvaldo Valenti (uncredited)
- Augusto Marcacci ... voice dubbing: Massimo Girotti, role of "Licinio" only (uncredited)
- Cesare Polacco ... voice dubbing: Primo Carnera (uncredited)
- Giovanna Scotto ... voice dubbing: Dina Perbellini (uncredited)

== Production ==
The film had an unusually large budget and was filmed on elaborate sets at the newly built Cinecittà studios. It stands out in Blasetti's filmography, as several of his most famous films instead were shot on location and used non-professional actors, whereas this was instead a big budget, controlled, set structured production. The Iron Crown belongs to what is sometimes regarded as a tetralogy of films by Blasetti which deal with mythological themes. The other three films are Ettore Fieramosca from 1938, Un'avventura di Salvator Rosa from 1940 and The Jester's Supper from 1942.

The Italian actress Vittoria Carpi in an uncredited role shows a bare breast for moments in the film, and may have been the first actress to do so in an Italian sound film. However, the credit for this is normally given to Clara Calamai in Blasetti's next film, La cena delle beffe (1941), probably because Calamai is the protagonist of that film.

== Reception ==
H. H. T. of The New York Times wrote in 1949, when the film was released in the United States: "There's enough sound and fury in the Rialto's new tenant, a pre-war Italian film called The Iron Crown, to blow the box-office clean across Times Square, if it hasn't done so already. For this adventure-spectacle of ancient times has recruited what seems to be about half the population of Italy, and they all manage to keep busy. ... But the film wastes no time in dropping all religious overtones and comfortably settling in the old boy meets girl rut. In fact, The Iron Crown is just another romance, played against some magnificent backgrounds with more violence and bloodshed than usual." The American film scholar Peter Bondanella wrote in his 2009 book A History of Italian Cinema: "The Iron Crown is an ambiguous work: while its message underlines a common sentiment among Italians at the time—the desire for peace and the cessation of hostilities during World War II—the symbolic implications of the search for a charismatic leader who will restore a magic crown to its rightful place in Rome may also point to Mussolini, Il Duce of a newly revived Rome. Nonetheless, Blasetti unquestionably gave new life to the Italian treatment of heroic mythology born in the silent era with Pastrone's Cabiria, and The Iron Crown is one of several important antecedents to the postwar genre of the peplum ('sword and sandal' epic) that would become such a cult favorite among film buffs."

== Awards ==
- Venice Film Festival: "Mussolini Cup" for Best Italian Film.
