= Don Cesare di Bazan =

- Directed by: Riccardo Freda
- Screenplay by: Sergio Amidei; Vitaliano Brancati; Riccardo Freda; Cesare Zavatini; Giacomo Debenedetti
- Based on: Don César de Bazan by: Adolphe d'Ennery; Philippe Dumanoir
- Produced by: Riccardo Freda
- Starring: Gino Cervi; Anneliese Uhlig; Paolo Stoppa; Enrico Glori
- Cinematography: Mario Craveri
- Edited by: Rolando Benedetti
- Music by: Franco D'Achiardi
- Production company: Elica Artisti Associati
- Distributed by: Artisti Associati
- Release date: 4 October 1942 (Italy)
- Running time: 77 minutes
- Country: Italy

Don Cesare di Bazan is a 1942 Italian historical adventure film directed by Riccardo Freda and starring Gino Cervi, Anneliese Uhlig and Paolo Stoppa. The film is set during the Catalan Revolt (1640–1659). It is based on a play by Philippe Dumanoir and Adolphe d'Ennery. It marked the directoral debut of Freda who went on to be a leading commercial Italian filmmaker.

== Cast ==
- Gino Cervi as Don Cesare di Bazan
- Anneliese Uhlig as Renée Dumas
- Paolo Stoppa as Sancho
- Enrico Glori as Il visconte di Beaumont
- Enzo Biliotti as Filippo IV
- Giovanni Grasso as Don José di Nogueira
- Carlo Duse as Il "Corvo", il messagero del visconte
- Antonio Marietti as Il giovane conte, il finto attore
- Alfredo Robert as Pasquale Cornalis, il capocomico
- Sandrino Moreno as Il bambino
- Anna Maria Dionisi as La cameriera di Renée
- Ermanno Donati as Velasquez
- Antonio Acqua as Il capitano Ribera
- Armando Francioli as Un nobile cavaliere
- Alfredo Martinelli as Un nobile cospiratore
- Angelo Dessy as Il cospiratore che provoca il duello
- Pietro Tordi as Uno dei finti attori
- Cellio Bucchi as Il duca di Orovesa
- Umberto Sclanizza as Il taverniere
- Evaristo Signorini as Un altro nobile cospiratore

== Release ==
DonCesare di Bazan was released in Italy on 4 October 1942 where it was distributed by Artisti Associati.
