= Lola Braccini =

Italian actress (1889–1969)

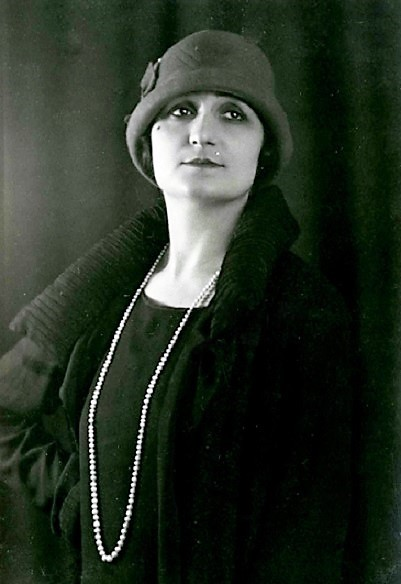
- Born: Camilla Cariddi; 28 March 1889; Pisa, Italy
- Died: 19 March 1969 (aged 79); Rome, Italy
- Occupation: Actress

Lola Braccini (born Camilla Cariddi, 28 March 1889 – 19 March 1969) was an Italian film, television and stage actress.

== Life and career ==
Born in Pisa, Braccini moved to Rome at 14 years old and debuted on stage in 1912 as an extra at the Teatro Argentina, in a theatrical work directed by Cesare Dondini. After a series of other experiences, in 1917 she entered the company held by Antonio Gandusio, with whom she stayed until 1922, while in 1924 she had her first leading roles.

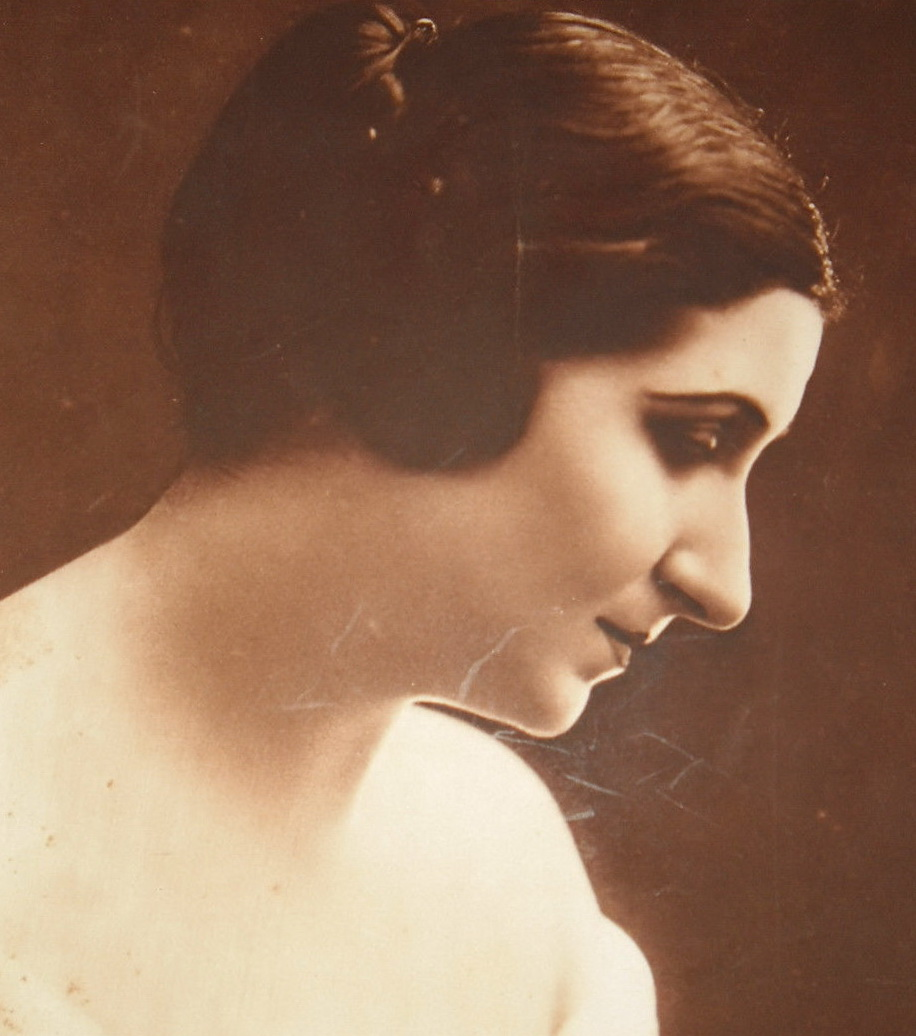
Lola Braccini in 1927.

In 1939 Braccini debuted in a role of "mother" with the company headed by Dina Galli, and in a short time this kind of role became distinctive of her subsequent career, notably gaining critical acclaim for her performance as Christine Mannon in an adaptation of Mourning Becomes Electra directed in 1942 by Anton Giulio Bragaglia. After the war she kept on working on stage with notable directors, including Luchino Visconti, Garinei & Giovannini, Giorgio De Lullo. She was also active in films and on television, and was a voice actress and a dubber. She died in a clinic of Parioli, where she had been hospitalized a week before for heart ailments.

== Partial filmography ==
- My Little One (1933) - Anna, la governante
- To Live (1936)
- No Man's Land (1939) - La signora Securo
- Traversata nera (1939) - Miss Geraldine Grey
- Piccolo hotel (1939) - Rosa Fargas
- Defendant, Stand Up! (1939) - La portinaia
- Mille chilometri al minuto! (1939)
- The Boarders at Saint-Cyr (1939) - La direttrice del collegio
- Manon Lescaut (1940) - La direttrice
- Giù il sipario (1940)
- The Hussar Captain (1940) - La seconda zia
- I mariti (Tempesta d'anime) (1941)
- Carmela (1942) - La moglie del sindaco
- Odessa in fiamme (1942) - (uncredited)
- What a Distinguished Family (1945) - Alessandra
- I Met You in Naples (1946)
- Pronto chi parla? (1946)
- Anthony of Padua (1949) - Sua madre
- Bellissima (1951) - Photographer's Wife
- It's Never Too Late (1953) - Madre di Antonio Trabbi
- Cronaca di un delitto (1953) - Madre di Luisa
- Too Young for Love (1953) - Zia di Sergio
- Buon viaggio pover'uomo (1953) - Mamma Caterina
- Verdi, the King of Melody (1953) - (uncredited)
- What Scoundrels Men Are! (1953) - Boarding house owner
- Angels of Darkness (1954) - Signora Capello
- Valeria ragazza poco seria (1958)
- The Beautiful Legs of Sabrina (1958) - The Lady with a Dog
- Winter Holidays (1959) - Mistress of Strange House
- Gastone (1960) - La " signora"
- Le olimpiadi dei mariti (1960)
- The Leopard (1963) - Donna Margherita
- Seduced and Abandoned (1964) - Amalia Califano
- Amori pericolosi (1964) - (segment "La ronda") (final film role)
