= All of Life in One Night =

1938 film

- Directed by: Corrado D'Errico
- Written by: Corrado D'Errico; Cesare Ludovici (novel); Ettore Maria Margadonna
- Produced by: Federico D'Avack
- Starring: Luisa Ferida; Camillo Pilotto; Mino Doro
- Cinematography: Akos Farkas
- Edited by: Eraldo Da Roma
- Music by: Costantino Ferri
- Production company: Imperator Film
- Distributed by: Euro International Film
- Release date: May 1938
- Running time: 70 minutes
- Country: Italy
- Language: Italian

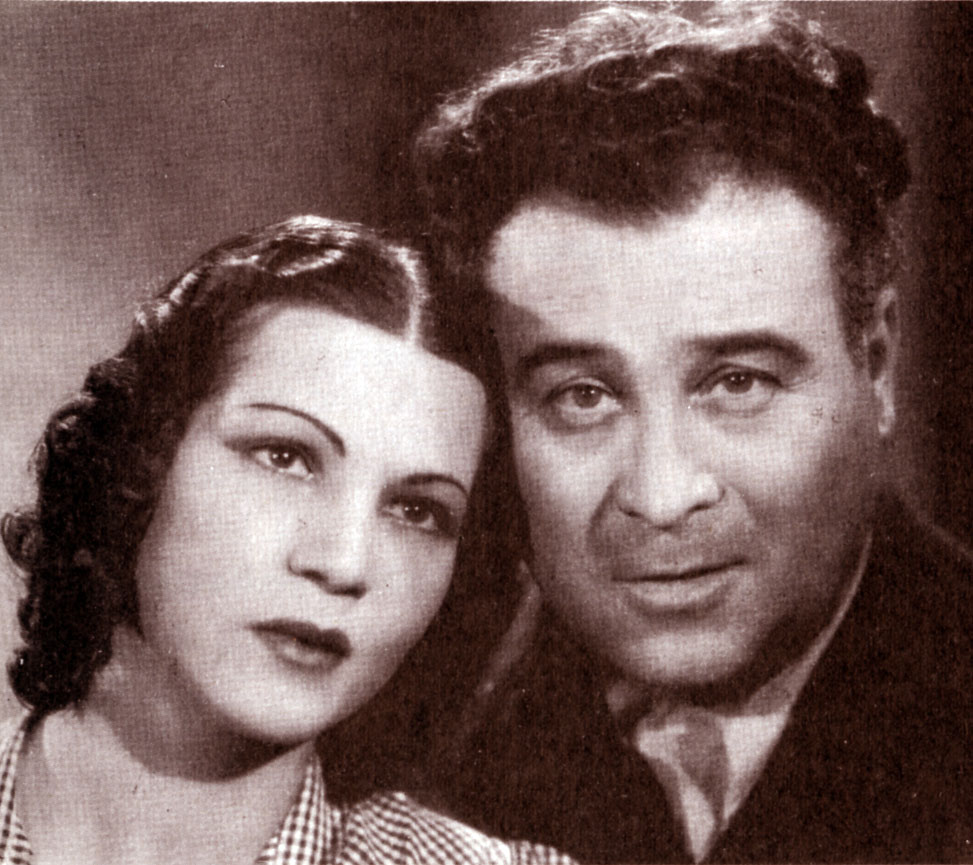
Production still from the film

All of Life in One Night (Italian: Tutta la vita in una notte) is a 1938 Italian drama film directed by Corrado D'Errico and starring Luisa Ferida, Camillo Pilotto and Mino Doro.

It was made at the Pisorno Studios in Tirrenia. The film's sets were designed by Salvo D'Angelo.

== Main cast ==
- Luisa Ferida as Maria
- Camillo Pilotto as Francesco
- Mino Doro as Giorgio
- Germana Paolieri as Giulia
- Lily Vincenti as Vinny
- Umberto Sacripante as Walter
- Fausto Guerzoni as Tramontana
- Guglielmo Sinaz as Zanis
- Luigi Erminio D'Olivo
- Carla Fatarella
- Walter Grant (actor)
- Jucci Kellermann
- Nais Lago
- Ferruccio Manzetti
- Livia Minelli
- Renato Navarrini
- Albino Principe
- Yvonne Sandner
- Edda Soligo

== Bibliography ==
- Enrico Lancia. Dizionario del cinema italiano: Dal 1930 al 1944. Gremese Editore, 2005.
