= Buon viaggio pover'uomo =

- Directed by: Giorgio Pastina
- Written by: Fabrizio Sarazani; Vitaliano Brancati
- Cinematography: Augusto Tiezzi
- Edited by: Mario Serandrei
- Music by: Renzo Rossellini
- Distributed by: Variety Distribution
- Release date: 1951
- Country: Italy
- Language: Italian

Buon viaggio pover'uomo is a 1951 Italian drama film directed by Giorgio Pastina.

== Plot ==
We are on the outskirts of Milan, where for thirty years the mild-mannered accountant Torquato, Sicilian by origin, who works in a company where the office manager and other employees never take him into consideration at best and despise him at worst. At home, he has to deal with everyday problems with family members and noisy neighborhoods. One morning the office manager assigns him a commission: he has to go to the registry office to collect important documents. He gets them and puts them in his leather briefcase, but decides to wander around the city center and, stopping inside a bar, gets distracted for a moment and another customer involuntarily exchanges his briefcase with his own. Forced to frantically research, the accountant manages to recover the stock exchange from the general markets; he returns to the office upset and there he is joined by a messenger who gives him a reward of 100,000 lire as a prize from the owner of the exchanged bag. Torquato thus decides to take a vacation, after the ruthless office manager has never granted it to him for eleven years, and decides to embark on a trip to Rome or Naples. Not without difficulty, he asked for the holidays due to the company, and made his family believe that he was traveling for business; at the last moment he buys a ticket to Capri and on the train he gives in to the flattery of a charming woman not suspecting that she is actually a thief. She takes off his wallet and, having arrived in Rome, the unfortunate person realizes that he is left without money and without documents. In desperation, he is forced to join a caravan of Milanese pilgrims who have arrived in the capital for the Holy Year. Having freed himself of their company, he goes around Rome in search of some relative of his who could possibly host him, but everything turns out to be in vain; he is therefore forced to spend the night in a convent room, and there a sort of religious vocation makes its way into his soul, while in the Lombard capital his family members, anxious for not having received phone calls, turn to the Commissariat in the hope of track it down. The friars of the convent discover at the same moment that Torquato's sudden vocation is not sincere; the clerk, repenting the crazy thought of him, buys a toy he had long promised to his son and leaves for Milan without knowing that his wife is about to join him in Rome. A nasty surprise awaits him: his child is seriously ill and is in danger of dying. The man, distraught, asks God for forgiveness and, just when his wife returns out of breath, the miracle occurs with the healing of the son. Life for them will resume between the usual daily noises and the usual harassment suffered in the workplace, but the employee will start again with a new conviction of life and greater foresight, pressed by the rigors of the lived experience.

== Cast ==
- Umberto Spadaro as Torquato Merumi
- Vera Carmi as Teresa
- Enzo Staiola as Cesar (as Enzo Stajola)
- Nando Bruno as Saletti
- Ernesto Calindri as Saverio
- Anna Di Leo as Caterina
- Alfredo Varelli as Padre Antonio
- Lola Braccini as Mamma Caterina
- Eduardo Passarelli as Punugli
- Cesare Fantoni as Il commissario
- Arturo Bragaglia as Il viaggiatore nervoso
- Nando Tamberlani as Padre Priore
- Natale Cirino as Commissario di Milano
- Silvio Bagolini
- Paolo Stoppa
