= What a Distinguished Family =

1945 film

- Directed by: Mario Bonnard
- Written by: Mario Bonnard
- Starring: Gino Cervi; Assia Noris; Aroldo Tieri
- Cinematography: Anchise Brizzi
- Edited by: Gino Talamo
- Music by: Giulio Bonnard
- Production companies: Itala Acustica; Società Italiana Cines
- Distributed by: ENIC
- Release date: 3 October 1945
- Running time: 78 minutes
- Country: Italy
- Language: Italian

What a Distinguished Family (Italian: Che distinta famiglia!) is a 1945 Italian "white-telephones" comedy film directed by Mario Bonnard and starring Gino Cervi, Assia Noris and Aroldo Tieri.

The film's art direction was by Gastone Medin. Due to the events of 25 July 1943, the making of the film was interrupted or temporarily suspended. The film was only released in public cinemas at the end of 1945.

== Cast ==
- Gino Cervi as Michele Montischi
- Assia Noris as Mary
- Aroldo Tieri as Duca Lothar Scintillati
- Paolo Stoppa as James
- Rina Morelli as Patrizia
- Liliana Laine
- Enrico Viarisio as Civil State Officer
- Guglielmo Barnabò as Boris Montischi
- Galeazzo Benti as The real Michele di Montuja
- Dina Perbellini as Olga
- Lola Braccini as Alessandra
- Dhia Cristiani as Cameriera
- Mario Siletti as Ferdinando
- Angelo Baldanello as De Funès
- Mario Gallina as Nicola

== Bibliography ==
- Moliterno, Gino. Historical Dictionary of Italian Cinema. Scarecrow Press, 2008.
