= Renzo Giovampietro =

Italian actor, theatre director, and playwright (1924–2005)

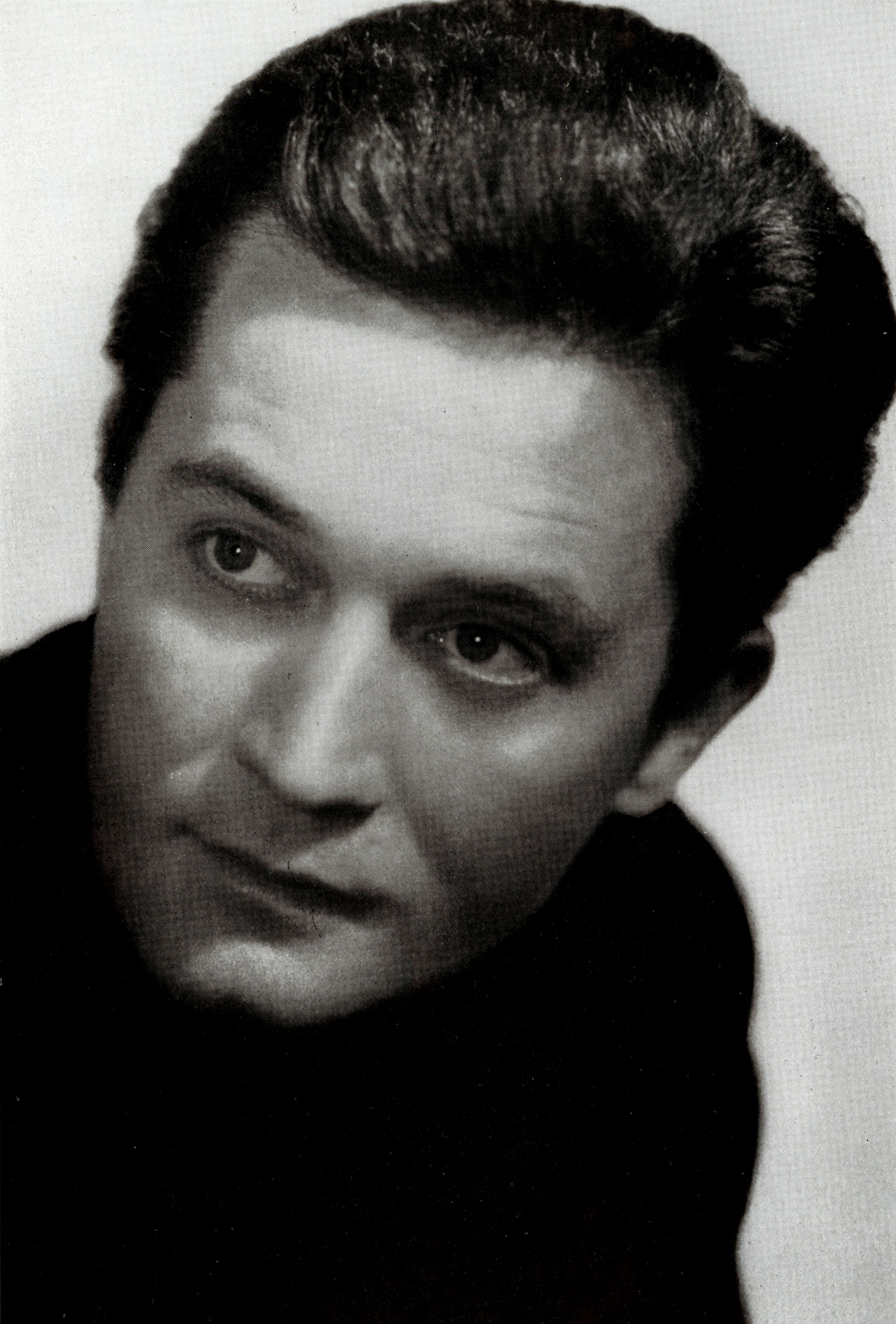
- Giovampietro in 1954
- Born: 23 June 1924; Velletri, Italy
- Died: 10 March 2006 (aged 81); Rome, Italy
- Occupation: Actor

Renzo Giovampietro (23 June 1924 – 10 March 2006) was an Italian actor, theatre director and playwright.

== Life and career ==
Born in Velletri, Rome, the son of a carpenter and of a cook, in 1944 Giovampietro enrolled at the Silvio d’Amico Academy of Dramatic Arts. He started his acting career in 1945 and was mainly active on stage, working with Luchino Visconti, Giorgio Strehler, Salvo Randone, Luigi Squarzina and Memo Benassi, among others. Occasionally also active in films and on television, from the early 1960s Giovampietro focused his activities on adaptations of classics on stage.

== Selected filmography ==
- I Met You in Naples (1946)
- House of Ricordi (1954)
- Don Camillo's Last Round (1955)
- I pinguini ci guardano (1956)
- El Greco (1966)
- Sex Quartet (1966)
- The Lady of Monza (1969)
- Sandokan (1976)
- Open Doors (1990)
