= Osvaldo Valenti =

Italian actor

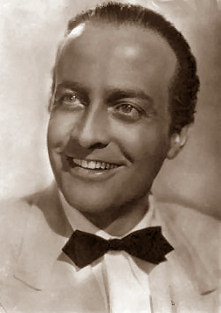
- Born: 17 February 1906; Constantinople, Ottoman Empire
- Died: 30 April 1945 (aged 39); Milan, Italy
- Cause of death: Execution by firing squad
- Occupation: Actor
- Years active: 1928–1945
- Military career
- Allegiance: Italian Social Republic
- Branch: Decima Flottiglia MAS
- Service years: 1944–1945
- Rank: Lieutenant
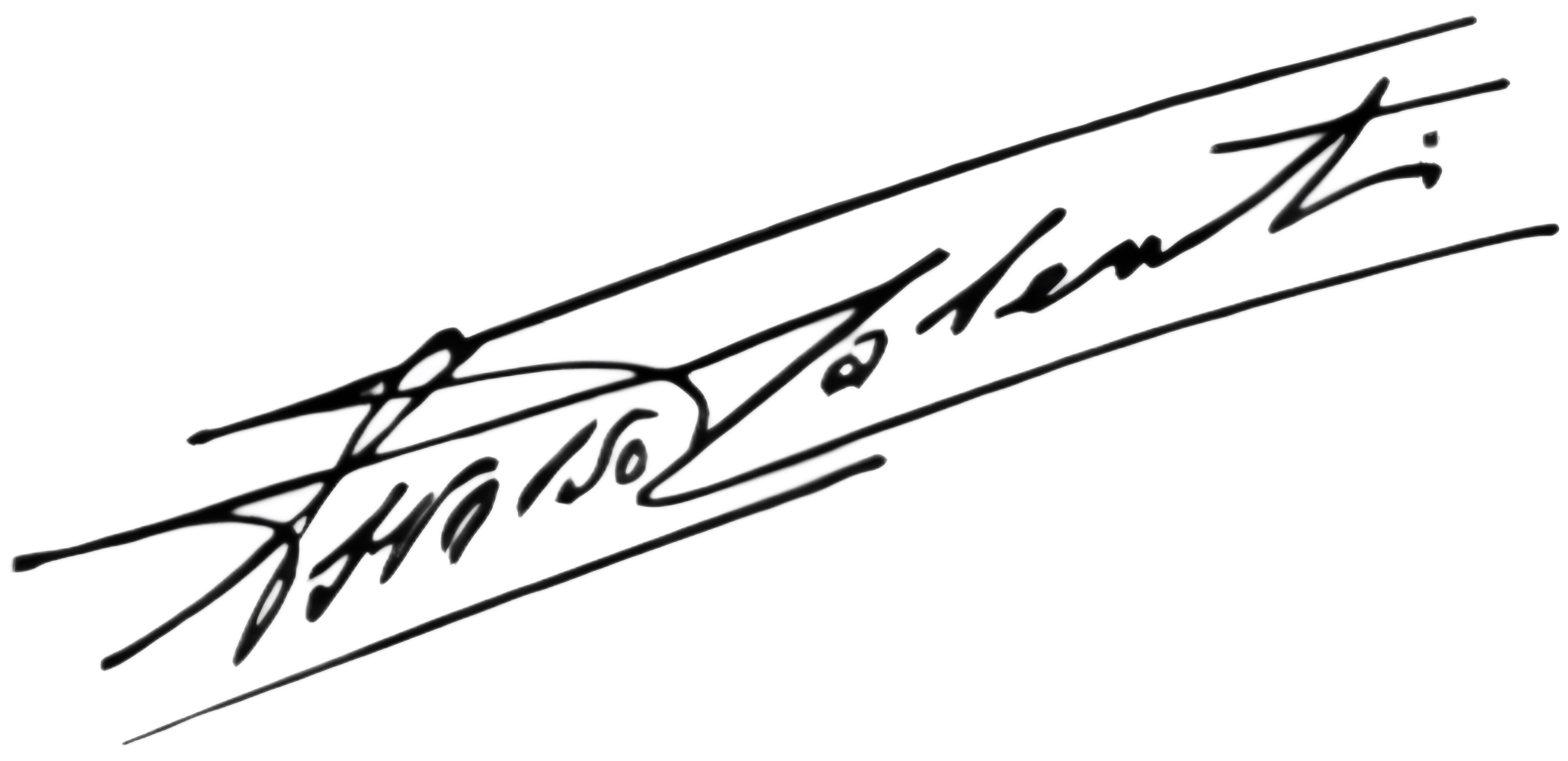
- Signature

Osvaldo Valenti (17 February 1906 – 30 April 1945) was an Italian film actor. Valenti starred in several successful Italian movies of the late 1930s and early 1940s, such as the famous The Iron Crown and The Jester's Supper. He appeared in more than 50 films between 1928 and 1945. He and his lover, Luisa Ferida, were executed by partisans in Milan, Italy, due to their links with Fascism. Their story was portrayed in the 2008 film Wild Blood.

== Biography ==
Osvaldo Valenti was born in Constantinople, Ottoman Empire (present-day Turkey), to a Sicilian nobleman and a wealthy Lebanese woman. His father was the Sicilian baron Michele Valenti, a wealthy merchant from Messina who dealt in carpets and precious oriental artefacts. His mother was Idelty Karichlopoulos, a wealthy Greek Cypriot woman born in Beirut, who was the daughter of the archimandrite of Cyprus.

In 1915 the family left Turkey for Italy, settling first in Bergamo and then in Milan. He attended high schools in St. Gallen, Switzerland and in Würzburg, Bavaria and subsequently enrolled in the law faculty of the Catholic University of Milan.

Two years later, he left the university and went to live first in Paris and then in Berlin, where he made his acting debut with a supporting role in the German silent drama film Hungarian Rhapsody, directed by Hanns Schwarz (1928). At the beginning of the 1930s, he returned to Italy and worked with film directors Mario Bonnard (Five to Nil, 1932) and Amleto Palermi (La fortuna di Zanze, 1933 and Creatures of the Night, 1934).

In 1935, Valenti met the famous film director Alessandro Blasetti, who gave him a role in the comedy film The Countess of Parma (1937). Valenti played the role of Guy de la Motte in Blasetti's Ettore Fieramosca (1938) gaining appreciation from both critics and the public alike. The success of the movie allowed him to star in many successful films and to be sought after by many leading directors. In 1939, while working on An Adventure of Salvator Rosa (1940), directed by Alessandro Blasetti, he met the actress Luisa Ferida. The pair became romantically involved and had a son, Kim, who died 4 days after his birth.

== The Second World War ==
In the summer of 1943, the collapse of the fascist regime, followed by the Allied air raids on the capital, caused severe setbacks to Italian film industry. In late 1943, Valenti joined the Republic of Salò, and moved to Venice together with his partner, Luisa Ferida, renouncing a contract for two films to be shot in Spain in early 1944.

Cinematographic activity restarted in Venice at the Cinevillaggio, created by the Minister of Popular Culture of the Italian Social Republic Fernando Mezzasoma. Valenti starred alongside Ferida in the 1944 film Fatto di Cronaca, directed by Piero Ballerini. This would be Valenti's last feature film. He then spent a few days in Bologna with Ferida, who was pregnant with his child. While they were staying at the Brues Hotel, she had a miscarriage. Shocked by the news, Valenti wrote to a friend: 'I don't want to hear any more talk about art and cinema. I don't want to go to Spain anymore, even though I have a very advantageous contract. I feel that my duty is to do something positive for this piece of land that we still have left".

In April 1944, Valenti joined, with the rank of lieutenant, the Decima Flottiglia MAS, an elite commando unit led by Junio Valerio Borghese. He moved to Milan with Ferida and became a liaison officer for the Kriegsmarine Command in Italy. In May 1944, Valenti joined the Battaglione 'Vega', a branch of the National Republican Navy's Intelligence Service. His knowledge of German and French made him a valuable asset in intelligence operations. Valenti participated in several covert missions to Switzerland on behalf of the Decima Flottiglia MAS. During the liberation of Milan on 25 April 1945, Valenti and Ferida were arrested by members of the Italian Resistance and shot five days later without trial. When they were executed, Ferida was expecting another child. They are buried in the Cimitero Maggiore di Milano.

== Partial filmography ==
- Hungarian Rhapsody (1928) – Der Fähnrich
- Five to Nil (1932) – Barenghi
- La signorina dell'autobus (1933) – Giacomo
- La fortuna di zanze (1933)
- Ragazzo (1934) – Malvivente di borgata
- Creatures of the Night (1934)
- The Dance of Time (1936)
- The Countess of Parma (1936) – Duca di Fadda
- Queen of the Scala (1937)
- Mia moglie si diverte (1938) – Tommy Bolden
- Ettore Fieramosca (1938) – Guy de la Motte
- La signora di Montecarlo (1938)
- A Thousand Lire a Month (1939) – Gabriele Corodi
- The Widow (1939) – Padova, il pittore
- The Fornaretto of Venice (1939) – Alvise Duodo
- Frenzy (1939) – Sigfrido
- Hurricane in the Tropics (1939) – Il tenente Reguero
- An Adventure of Salvator Rosa (1939) – Lamberto d'Arco
- Una lampada alla finestra (1940) – Dick
- Fanfulla da Lodi (1940) – Franco di Genova
- Love Trap (1940) – Il conte di Brazeuil
- Antonio Meucci (1940) – Giuseppe Garibaldi giovane
- Beyond Love (1940) – Livio Sabelli
- Abandonment (1940) – Leonard
- Boccaccio (1940) – Berto
- La leggenda azzurra (1940) – L'ufficiale straniero
- La zia smemorata (1940) – Paolo Ravelli
- Captain Fracasse (1940) – Il duca Ruggero di Vallombrosa
- I pirati del golfo (1940)
- Idyll in Budapest (1941) – Sandor
- Giuliano de' Medici (1941) – Franceschino de' Pazzi
- The King of England Will Not Pay (1941) – Il secondo Antellesi
- The Iron Crown (1941) – Eriberto
- Beatrice Cenci (1941) – Giacomo Cenci
- Don Buonaparte (1941) – Maso
- The Mask of Cesare Borgia (1941) – Cesare Borgia
- The Secret Lover (1941) – Valentini
- First Love (1941) – Giovannino Cafiero
- Il vetturale del San Gottardo (1941) – Mortens
- La sonnambula (1941) – Il conte Osvaldo Merola
- Sancta Maria (1942) – Jack
- The Jester's Supper (1942) – Giannetto Malespini
- The Two Orphans (1942) – Pietro
- Sleeping Beauty (1942) – Don Vincenzo Caramandola
- Orizzonte di sangue (1942) – Alioscia
- Fedora (1942) – Vladimiro Yariskine
- Luisa Sanfelice (1942) – Nelson
- Piazza San Sepolcro (1942) – Napoleone da giovane
- Knights of the Desert (1942) – Il capitano Serra
- Gli ultimi filibustieri (1943) – Ramon de la Sierra
- La valle del diavolo (1943) – Il barone Rider
- Harlem (1943) – Chris Sherman
- Enrico IV (1943) – Il conte Enrico Di Nolli / Enrico IV
- The Innkeeper (1944) – Cavaliere di Ripafratta
- Fatto di cronaca (1945)

== Bibliography ==
- Brunetta, Gian Piero (1993) [1979]. Storia del cinema italiano. Vol. II (Il cinema del regime 1929-1945). Rome: Editori Riuniti.
- Bracalini, Romano (1985). Celebri e dannati. Osvaldo Valenti e Luisa Ferida. Storia e tragedia di due divi del regime. Milan: Longanesi.
- Cazzadori, Luigi (1998). Osvaldo Valenti-Luisa Ferida. Pinerolo: Novantico Editore.
- Reggiani, Odoardo (2001). Luisa Ferida, Osvaldo Valenti. Ascesa e caduta di due stelle del cinema. Milan: Spirali.
- Moscati, Italo (2004). "VALENTI, Osvaldo". Enciclopedia del Cinema. Rome: Istituto dell'Enciclopedia Italiana.
- Brunetta, Gian Piero (2009). The History of Italian Cinema: A Guide to Italian Film from Its Origins to the Twenty-first Century. Princeton, NJ: Princeton University Press. ISBN 978-0691119885.
- Gundle, Stephen (2013). Mussolini's Dream Factory: Film Stardom in Fascist Italy. New York-Oxford: Berghahn Books. ISBN 978-1-78-238244-7.
- Puppa, Paolo (2020). "VALENTI, Osvaldo". Dizionario Biografico degli Italiani (in Italian). Vol. 97: Trivulzio–Valeri. Rome: Istituto dell'Enciclopedia Italiana. ISBN 978-88-12-00032-6.
