= The King of England Will Not Pay =

1941 film

- Directed by: Giovacchino Forzano
- Written by: Giovacchino Forzano; Pio Vanzi; Giuseppe Zucca
- Starring: Andrea Checchi; Silvana Jachino; Osvaldo Valenti
- Cinematography: Manfredo Bertini
- Edited by: Giovacchino Forzano; Guido Ricci
- Music by: Giovacchino Forzano; Alberto Franchetti
- Production companies: Arno Film; Industria Cinematografica Italiana; Pisorno Cinematografica
- Distributed by: Cine Tirrenia
- Release date: 12 April 1941
- Running time: 90 minutes
- Country: Italy
- Language: Italian

The King of England Will Not Pay (Italian: Il re d'Inghilterra non paga) is a 1941 Italian historical drama film directed by Giovacchino Forzano and starring Andrea Checchi, Silvana Jachino and Osvaldo Valenti. It was shot at the Tirrenia Studios. The film's sets were designed by the art directors Antonio Valente and Savino Fino.

== Synopsis ==
In the thirteenth century a leading Florentine banking family are faced with ruin when the King of England refuses to repay a large loan he has taken out from them.

== Main cast ==
- Andrea Checchi as Ippolito Buondelmonti
- Silvana Jachino as Dianora dei Bardi
- Osvaldo Valenti as Il secondo Antellesi
- Mario Mina as Il vecchio Luca Buondelmonti
- Egisto Olivieri as Piero Buondelmonti
- Nino Pavese as Rico Buondelmonti
- Giuseppe Addobbati as Tommaso Buondelmonti
- Giovanni Onorato as Cecco Buondelmonti
- Elodia Maresca as Anna Buondelmonti
- Anita Farra as Una dama della casa Buondelmonti
- Grazia Ceri as Un' altra dama della casa Buondelmonti
- Maria Labia as La badessa
- Alfredo De Sanctis as Alessandro dei Bardi
- Alfredo Robert as Il primo Buonaccorsi
- Luisa Rossi as Un'altra dama della casa dei Bardi
- Stefano Sciaccaluga as Giovanni Boccaccio
- Umberto Sclanizza as Il primo Acciaioli
- Aldo Silvani as Il banchiere Lorenzo Peruzzi
- Vinicio Sofia as Il Cocchi, banchiere del contado
- Giulio Tempesti as Il segretario dei Buondelmonti

== Bibliography ==
- Gundle, Stephen. Fame Amid the Ruins: Italian Film Stardom in the Age of Neorealism. Berghahn Books, 2019.
