= Luisa Ferida =

Italian actress (1914–1945)

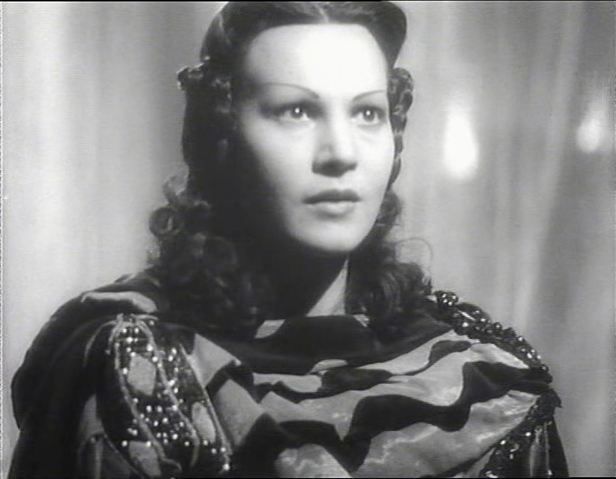
- Born: Luisa Manfrini Farnet; 18 March 1914; Castel San Pietro Terme, Bologna, Kingdom of Italy
- Died: 30 April 1945 (aged 31); Milan, Kingdom of Italy
- Occupation: Actress
- Criminal status: Executed by firing squad

Luisa Ferida, real surname Manfrini (18 March 1914 – 30 April 1945), was an Italian stage and film actress. She was considered a diva in Italian cinema during 1935 to 1945 and was the highest paid movie star of that period. Ferida is remembered for her death; immediately after the end of the Italian Civil War, she was executed together with her lover, the actor and member of Decima Flottiglia MAS Osvaldo Valenti, as both were judged guilty of participation in war crimes and torture in connection with so-called Koch gang. Years later she was deemed uninvolved to the Koch's crimes. Therefore a war pension was allocated to the mother, who had no other source of income.

== Career ==
Born Luisa Manfrini Farnet in Castel San Pietro Terme, near Bologna, Ferida started as a stage actress. In 1935 she made her first appearance in film with a supporting role in La Freccia d'oro. Because of her photogenic looks and talent as an actress, she soon graduated to leading roles by the end of the 1930s.

In 1939, while working on Un Avventura di Salvator Rosa (1940), directed by Alessandro Blasetti, she met the actor Osvaldo Valenti. The pair became romantically involved and had a son.

== Death ==
Ferida's romantic partner, Valenti had been linked to many fascist officials and people for years and he eventually joined the Italian Social Republic, and for this reason he was on the Italian resistance movement's (partisan's) hit list. In April 1945, Valenti was arrested in Milan, alongside a pregnant Ferida. They were both sentenced to death and were summarily executed in the street without any proper trial by partisans. The partisan chief who organized the execution, Giuseppe "Vero" Marozin, during a trial by Milano's tribunal, defended himself declaring that the partisan leader who by telephone ordered the two actors be executed was Sandro Pertini, who during the year 1978 became president of the Italian republic: this version is confirmed by Treccani.

== Cultural references ==
The film Sanguepazzo starring Luca Zingaretti and Monica Bellucci discusses Luisa Ferida's relationship with Osvaldo Valenti. The film premiered at the 2008 Cannes Film Festival.

Ferida is briefly mentioned in Natalia Ginzburg's 1969 autobiographical novel-cum-memoir, Family Lexicon (Lessico Famigliare), during a description of the wartime experience of Lisetta, a minor character, who had "been interrogated by Ferida" while imprisoned the Villa Triste after being arrested as part of the Italian resistance during World War II. The Villa Triste ("Sad Villa") was a house in Milan that served as the headquarters of Pietro Koch, the leader of the fascist anti-partisan gang of which Ferida and Valenti were members.

== Partial filmography ==
- Golden Arrow (1935) - Evelyn - figlia di Sleiden
- The Joker King (1936) - Trottola
- The Amnesiac (1936) - Giulietta
- The Two Sergeants (1936) - Lauretta Fracassa
- The Ambassador (1936)
- Il grande silenzio (1936) - La figlia dell'ucciso
- White Amazons (1936)
- The Castiglioni Brothers (1937) - Nina Castiglioni
- Tomb of the Angels (1937) - Luisa
- The Three Wishes (1937) - Maria Lauri
- I due barbieri (1937)
- The Count of Brechard (1938) - Maria
- All of Life in One Night (1938) - Maria
- L'argine (1938) - Sina
- Il suo destino (1938) - Maria, la ballerina
- Star of the Sea (1938) - Luisa
- Mad Animals (1939) - Maria Luisa
- An Adventure of Salvator Rosa (1939) - Lucrezia
- The Secret of Villa Paradiso (1940) - Mary, la cantante
- La fanciulla di Portici (1940) - Lucia
- The Iron Crown (1941) - Kavaora, madre di Tundra & Tundra
- Blood Wedding (1941) - Nazaria
- Amore imperiale (1941) - La principessa Elisabetta di Russia
- The Jester's Supper (1942) - Fiammetta
- Headlights in the Fog (1942) - Piera
- L'ultimo addio (1942) - Irene Serra
- Sleeping Beauty (1942) - Carmela
- Orizzonte di sangue (1942) - Daria
- Fedora (1942) - Fedora
- Jealousy (1942) - Agrippina Solmo
- Knights of the Desert (1942) - Ara
- The Son of the Red Corsair (1943) - Carmen
- Sad Loves (1943)
- Tristi amori (1943) - Emma Scarli
- Grazia (1943)
- The Innkeeper (1944) - Mirandolina
- Fatto di cronaca (1945) - (final film role)
