= Giuseppe Zucca =

Italian screenwriter (1887–1959)

- Born: 1 May 1887; Messina, Sicily, Italy
- Died: 2 December 1959 (aged 72); Rome, Lazio, Italy
- Occupation: Screenwriter
- Years active: 1934-1955 (film)

Giuseppe Zucca (1887–1959) was an Italian screenwriter. He wrote twenty six screenplays during his career, including the 1949 adventure film William Tell.

== Selected filmography ==
- The Old Guard (1934)
- Aldebaran (1935)
- Backstage (1939)
- The Iron Crown (1941)
- The King of England Will Not Pay (1941)
- Blood Wedding (1941)
- Headlights in the Fog (1942)
- William Tell (1949)
- Red Seal (1950)
- The Lovers of Manon Lescaut (1954)
