= Rina Morelli =

Italian actress (1908–1976)

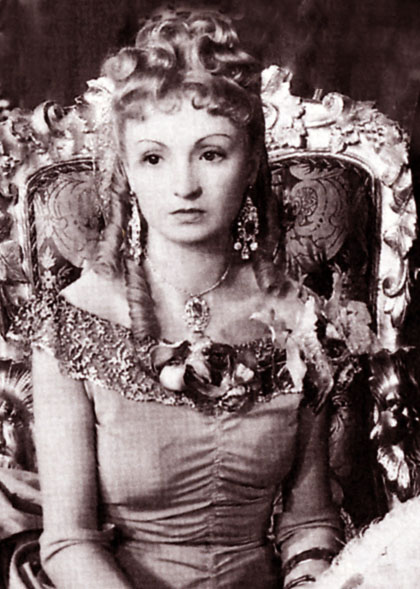
- Morelli in Fedora (1942)
- Born: Elvira Morelli; 6 December 1908; Naples, Italy
- Died: 17 July 1976 (aged 67); Rome, Italy
- Occupation: Actress
- Years active: 1939–1976

Rina Morelli (born Elvira Morelli; 6 December 1908 – 17 July 1976) was an Italian film and stage actress. She appeared in 34 films between 1939 and 1976. Her husband, Paolo Stoppa, was an Italian stage and film actor, as well as a renowned Italian language dubber for American film stars.

== Selected filmography ==
- An Adventure of Salvator Rosa (1939) – The duchess Isabella di Torniano
- The Iron Crown (1941) – Old woman with the spindle
- Yes, Madam (1942) – Suor Valeria
- Fedora (1942) – Olga Soukarev
- Don Julio (1942) – Socorrito
- Maria Malibran (1943) – Angelina
- Il nostro prossimo (1943) – The parson's housekeeper
- Gli assi della risata (1943) – Maid (segment "L'ombrello smarrito") (uncredited)
- Quartetto pazzo (1945) – Monica
- What a Distinguished Family (1945) – Patrizia
- Black Eagle (1946) – Irina
- Fabiola (1949) – Faustina
- The Forbidden Christ (1951) – Mother Baldi
- In Olden Days (1952) – Guido's mother (segment "L"idillio")
- The Return of Don Camillo (1953) – Bit part (uncredited)
- 100 Years of Love (1954) – Maria Bianchi (segment "Nozze d'Oro")
- Senso (1954) – Laura, the housekeeper
- Eighteen Year Olds (1955) – Signora La Rovere
- Andrea Chénier (1955) – Mother of Chénier
- The Intruder (1956) – Rosa
- Città di notte (1958) – Signora Prandi
- Gli zitelloni (1958) – Adalgisa
- Il bell'Antonio (1960) – Rosaria Magnano
- Toto, Fabrizi and the Young People Today (1960) – Teresa D'Amore
- The Joy of Living (1961) – Rosa Fossati
- The Lovemakers (1961) – (uncredited)
- Le Crime ne paie pas (1962) – Teresa – the confidant (segment "Le masque")
- The Shortest Day (1963) – Mother of Dino (uncredited)
- The Leopard (1963) – Princess Maria Stella Salina
- L'albero dalle foglie rosa (1974) – The grandmother
- Drama of the Rich (1974) – Giannina Murri
- L'Innocente (1976) – Tullio's Mother
