= Idyll in Budapest =

1941 film

- Directed by: Giorgio Ansoldi; Gabriele Varriale
- Written by: Santiago Salviche (play); Vittorio Malpassuti; Gabriele Varriale; Giorgio Ansoldi
- Starring: Germaine Aussey; Osvaldo Valenti; Sergio Tofano
- Cinematography: Mario Albertelli
- Edited by: Gabriele Varriale
- Music by: Costantino Ferri
- Production company: Schermi del Mondo
- Distributed by: Cine Tirrenia
- Release date: 22 January 1941
- Running time: 78 minutes
- Country: Italy
- Language: Italian

Idyll in Budapest (Italian: Idillio a Budapest) is a 1941 Italian comedy film directed by Giorgio Ansoldi and Gabriele Varriale and starring Germaine Aussey, Osvaldo Valenti and Sergio Tofano. It was shot at the Pisorno Studios in Tirrenia. The film's sets were designed by the art director Marcello Avenati.

== Cast ==
- Germaine Aussey as Rosy
- Osvaldo Valenti as Sandor
- Sergio Tofano as Altezza
- Inge Dawry as Paolina
- Giulio Alfieri
- Elena Altieri
- Arnaldo Arnaldi
- Liana Del Balzo
- Adele Garavaglia
- Fausto Guerzoni
- Loredana
- Renato Malavasi
- Evelina Paoli
- Michele Riccardini

== Bibliography ==
- Chiti, Roberto & Poppi, Roberto. I film: Tutti i film italiani dal 1930 al 1944. Gremese Editore, 2005.
