= Paolo Stoppa =

Italian actor (1906–1988)

Paolo Stoppa OMRI
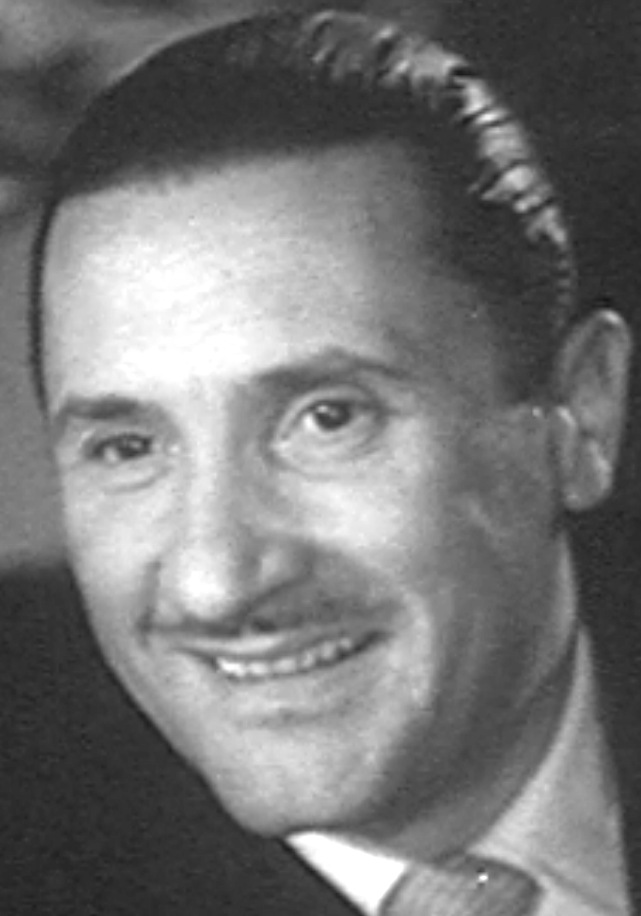
- Stoppa in 1946
- Born: 6 June 1906; Rome, Kingdom of Italy
- Died: 1 May 1988 (aged 81); Rome, Italy
- Occupations: Actor; voice actor
- Years active: 1934–1985

Paolo Stoppa (6 June 1906 – 1 May 1988) was an Italian actor.

== Biography ==
Paolo Stoppa was born in Rome into a family of a ministerial official, Luigi Stoppa, and Adriana De Antonis. He began as a stage actor in 1927 in the theater in Rome and began acting in films in 1932. From 1938 to 1940, he worked at the Teatro Eliseo, playing characters from the classical and modern repertoire.

Stoppa's most celebrated works include those after World War II, when he met director Luchino Visconti: the two, together with Stoppa's wife, actress Rina Morelli, formed a trio whose adaptations of works by authors such as Chekhov, Shakespeare and Goldoni became highly acclaimed. He gave to the theater a personal touch with his energetic play.

He debuted in television in 1960 in the drama series Vita col padre e con la madre, reaching the top of the popularity in the 1970s, in particular in the adaptation of crime novels by Friedrich Dürrenmatt (Il giudice e il suo boia and Il sospetto) and Augusto De Angelis.

As a film actor, Stoppa made some 194 appearances between 1932 and his retirement in 1983, with roles in popular classics such as Miracle in Milan (1951), Rocco and His Brothers (1960), Garibaldi (1961), The Leopard (1963), The Libertine (1968), and All My Friends Part 2 (1982). He also had a role in the Sergio Leone epic Once Upon a Time in the West (1968) and a cameo in Becket (1964).

Stoppa was also a renowned dubber of films into Italian. He began this activity in the 1930s as dubber of Fred Astaire. Other actors he dubbed include Richard Widmark, Kirk Douglas and Paul Muni.

Stoppa was initiated into the Scottish Rite Freemasonry.

Stoppa died of leukemia on 1 May 1988. His funeral chamber was set up in the foyer of the Teatro Eliseo, and the funeral ceremony was held at Sant'Ignazio.

== Filmography ==
- L'Armata Azzurra (1932)
- Quella vecchia canaglia (1934) – Giacomo
- Aurora sul mare (1934)
- Il serpente a sonagli (1935) – Andry – L'aiutante dell'ispettore
- The Joker King (1936) – Filuccio
- L'aria del continente (1936)
- The Anonymous Roylott (1936)
- Marcella (1937)
- The Lady in White (1938) – Il direttore dell'hotel a Cervinia
- The Dream of Butterfly (1939)
- L'amore si fa così (1939) – Zaccaria Poussier
- Frenzy (1939) – Bobby
- Unjustified Absence (1939) – Eugenio Sinibaldi
- L'aria del continente (1939)
- An Adventure of Salvator Rosa (1939) – Il secondo contadino
- Un mare di guai (1939) – Teodoro
- Wealth Without a Future (1939) – Buby D'Alfia
- Le sorprese del vagone letto (1940) – Il marchese Gino
- Two on a Vacation (1940) – Alvaro Monteiro, il capo reparto della ditta Do-re-mi
- Love Trap (1940) – Il finto poliziotto
- Love Me, Alfredo! (1940) – Cecè
- La canzone rubata (1940) – Alfredo, il maggiordomo
- Una famiglia impossibile (1940)
- Eternal Melodies (1940) – Haibl, clarinettista
- Il sogno di tutti (1940) – Il signore genovese
- Orizzonte dipinto (1941) – Lighetti
- Giuliano de' Medici (1941) – Volpino
- The Happy Ghost (1941) – Gigetto
- The Iron Crown (1941) – Trifilli
- Divieto di sosta (1941)
- Princess Cinderella (1941) – Il signor Bonaventura [Mr. Goodluck – US]
- The Last Dance (1941) – Felix
- Se non son matti non li vogliamo (1941) – Il conte Giuseppe Bardonazzi
- The Brambilla Family Go on Holiday (1941) – Gastone
- Non mi sposo più (1942)
- Se io fossi onesto (1942) – Il conte Paolo Vareghi
- The Queen of Navarre (1942) – Il corriere Babieca
- A che servono questi quattrini? (1942) – Marchitiello
- La signorina (1942) – L' amate di Fani
- Gioco pericoloso (1942) – Giovanni
- The Taming of the Shrew (1942) – Righetto
- Don Giovanni (1942) – Sganarello
- Rossini (1942) – Andrea Tòttola, il librettista
- Don Cesare di Bazan (1942) – Sancho
- Non ti pago! (1942) – L'avvocato Lorenzo Strumillo
- Story of a Poor Young Man (1942) – Bellavan d'Ormea
- Seven Years of Happiness (1942) – Il bandito balbuziente
- Torrents of Spring (1942) – Il dottore Berni
- Happy Days (1942) – Bernardo
- Music on the Run (1943) – Fogliatti, il produttore
- Il nostro prossimo (1943) – Il campanaro
- Incontri di notte (1943) – Francesco
- Gente dell'aria (1943) – Il tenente Guido Landi
- Il treno crociato (1943) – Il ferito con i cani (uncredited)
- Sant'Elena, piccola isola (1943) – Il medico curante di Napoleone
- Grattacieli (1943) – Frank Millstone
- Quattro ragazze sognano (1943) – Al Strong, il gangster
- I nostri sogni (1943) – Oreste
- Gli assi della risata (1943) – Cirillo Mele (segment "L'ombrello smarrito")
- The Last Wagon (1943)
- Apparition (1943) – Alberto
- Ti conosco, mascherina! (1943) – Luigi
- Grazia (1943)
- Il fiore sotto gli occhi (1944) – Arrigo Santucci
- Finalmente sì (1944) – Rossi
- Quartetto pazzo (1945) – Filippo Osman
- What a Distinguished Family (1945) – James
- A Yank in Rome (1946) – Sor Augusto
- I Met You in Naples (1946)
- Canto, ma sottovoce... (1946) – Arturo
- Il marito povero (1946) – Arturo
- Black Eagle (1946) – Un bandito
- Biraghin (1946) – Osvaldo Lanza di Robbio
- Farewell, My Beautiful Naples (1947) – Ruocco
- The Opium Den (1947) – amico di Za-la-Mort
- Il principe ribelle (1947)
- The Knights of the Black Masks (1948) – Un nobile balbuziente
- Che tempi! (1948) – Alessandro Raffo
- Fabiola (1949) – Proconsul Manlius Valerian
- Maracatumba... ma non è una rumba (1949) – Miguel Martinez, l'impresario
- I peggiori anni della nostra vita (1949) – Ninetto TRaballa
- Son of d'Artagnan (1950) – Paolo
- Beauty and the Devil (La beauté du diable) (1950) – Official
- Ring Around the Clock (1950) – Rocchetti
- Women and Brigands (1950) – Peppino Luciani
- The Thief of Venice (1950) – Marco
- Sambo (1950) – Manuel Lubreno
- Abbiamo vinto! (1951) – Augusto Fabriano
- Miracle in Milan (1951) – Rappi
- Without a Flag (1951) – Poggi – Il professore
- The Cape of Hope (1951) – Simon Liakim
- Roma ore 11 (1952) – Impiegato
- The Seven Deadly Sins (1952) – M. Alvaro (segment "Avarice and Anger")
- Wife For a Night (1952) – Agusto
- The City Stands Trial (1952) – Delegato di Polizia Perrone
- Little World of Don Camillo (1952)
- The Shameless Sex (1952) – Marco
- Beauties of the Night (1952) – Le directeur de l'Opéra
- Papà diventa mamma (1952)
- In Olden Days (1952) – Guido's father (segment "Idillio")
- Article 519, Penal Code (1952) – Avv. Sardi
- Sunday Heroes (1952) – Piero – aunt Carolina's nephew
- Il tallone d'Achille (1952) – Lo Strozzino Serafino
- Cats and Dogs (1952) – Don Cosimo
- Storms (1953) – Amedeo Cini
- Gioventù alla sbarra (1953) – Il giudice Benni
- Terminal Station (1953) – Annoying man with oranges (uncredited)
- Puccini (1953) – Giocondo
- Voice of Silence (1953)
- It's Never Too Late (1953) – Antonio Trabbi
- The Return of Don Camillo (1953) – Marchetti
- Buon viaggio pover'uomo (1953)
- Empty Eyes (1953) – Egisto Palmucci
- Ci troviamo in galleria (1953) – Voce (uncredited)
- Nemico pubblico n. 1 (1953) – Tony Fallone
- The Love of a Woman (1953) – Le curé
- The Walk (1953) – Il rettore
- Scampolo 53 (1953)
- The Count of Monte Cristo (1954) – Bertuccio (2)
- Daughters of Destiny (1954) – Nicephore (segment "Lysistrata")
- Mizar (1954) – Console italiano
- Neapolitan Carousel (1954) – Salvatore Esposito
- The Cheerful Squadron (1954) – Il maresciallo Flick
- Prima di sera (1954) – Paolo Bancani
- The Beautiful Otero (1954) – Frédéric
- Uomini ombra (1954) – Antiquario Bertrand
- House of Ricordi (1954) – Giovanni Ricordi
- The Gold of Naples (1954) – Don Peppino – il vedovo (segment "Pizze a credito")
- The Shadow (1954) – Michele
- My Seven Little Sins (1954) – Antonio
- La corrida dei mariti (1955) – (uncredited)
- Siamo uomini o caporali? (1955) – Capt. Black
- Il padrone sono me (1955) – Mingòn
- The Belle of Rome (1955) – Oreste
- The Miller's Beautiful Wife (1955) – Gardunia
- Destination Piovarolo (1955) – Gorini
- Il conte Aquila (1955) – Principe di Metternich
- Girls of Today (1955) – Peppino Bardellotti
- A Woman Alone (1956)
- Symphony of Love (1956) – Calafatti
- Pepote (Mi tío Jacinto) (1956) – Restaurador
- Arrivederci Dimas (1957) – Don Salvador
- Una pelliccia di visone (1957) – Russo
- Vacanze a Ischia (1957) – Advocate Appicciato
- Oh! Sabella (1957) – Avvocato Emilio Mancuso
- Miracles of Thursday (1957) - Don Salvador
- Avventura a Capri (1958)
- È arrivata la parigina (1958)
- The Law (1959) – Tonio
- Carthage in Flames (1960) – Astarito
- Escape by Night (1960) – Prince Alessandro Antoniani
- Le tre eccetera del colonnello (1960) – Le marquis
- Rocco and His Brothers (1960) – Cerri
- La contessa azzurra (1960) – Don Peppino Razzi
- From a Roman Balcony (1960) – Moglie
- Gastone (1960) – Achille
- Garibaldi (1961) – Nino Bixio
- La Menace (1961) – Cousin
- The Joy of Living (1961) – Giuseppe Gorgolano, the Hairdresser
- Vanina Vanini (1961) – Asdrubale Vanini
- The Last Judgment (1961) – Giorgio
- Horace 62 (1962) – Graziani
- Boccaccio '70 (1962) – Lawyer Alcamo (segment "Il lavoro") (uncredited)
- The Steppe (1962)
- The Shortest Day (1962) – Padre di Dino
- The Leopard (1963) – Don Calogero Sedara
- Becket (1964) – the Pope / Pope Alexander III
- The Visit (1964) – Doctor
- Behold a Pale Horse (1964) – Pedro
- After the Fox (1966) – Polio
- Il marito è mio e l'ammazzo quando mi pare (1966) – Sperenzoni
- Once Upon a Time in the West (1968) – Sam
- The Libertine (1968) – Professor Zauri
- The Adventures of Gerard (1970) – Santarem, Count of Morales
- Hector the Mighty (1972)
- Jus primae noctis (1972) – The pope
- Rugantino (1973) – Mastro Titta
- Les Bidasses s'en vont en guerre (1974) – Le colonel
- Nerone (1977) – San Pietro
- Beach House (1977) – Il nonno
- The Payoff (1978) – don Michele Miletti
- Il Marchese del Grillo (1981) – Papa Pio VII
- Tomorrow We Dance (1982) – Father of Mariangela
- All My Friends Part 2 (1982) – Savino Capogreco
- Heads I Win, Tails You Lose (1982) – The Grandpa
