= Tirrenia Studios =

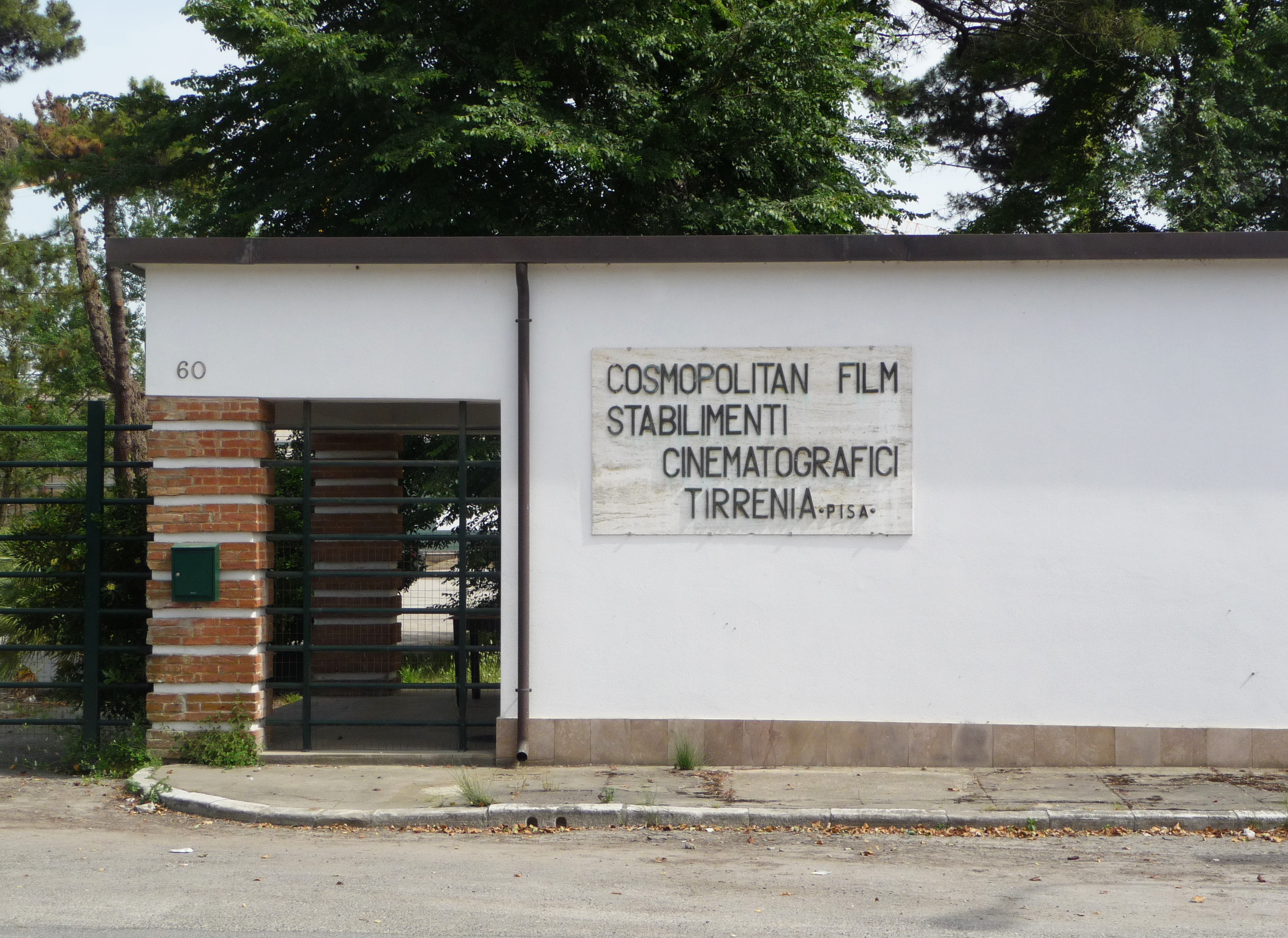

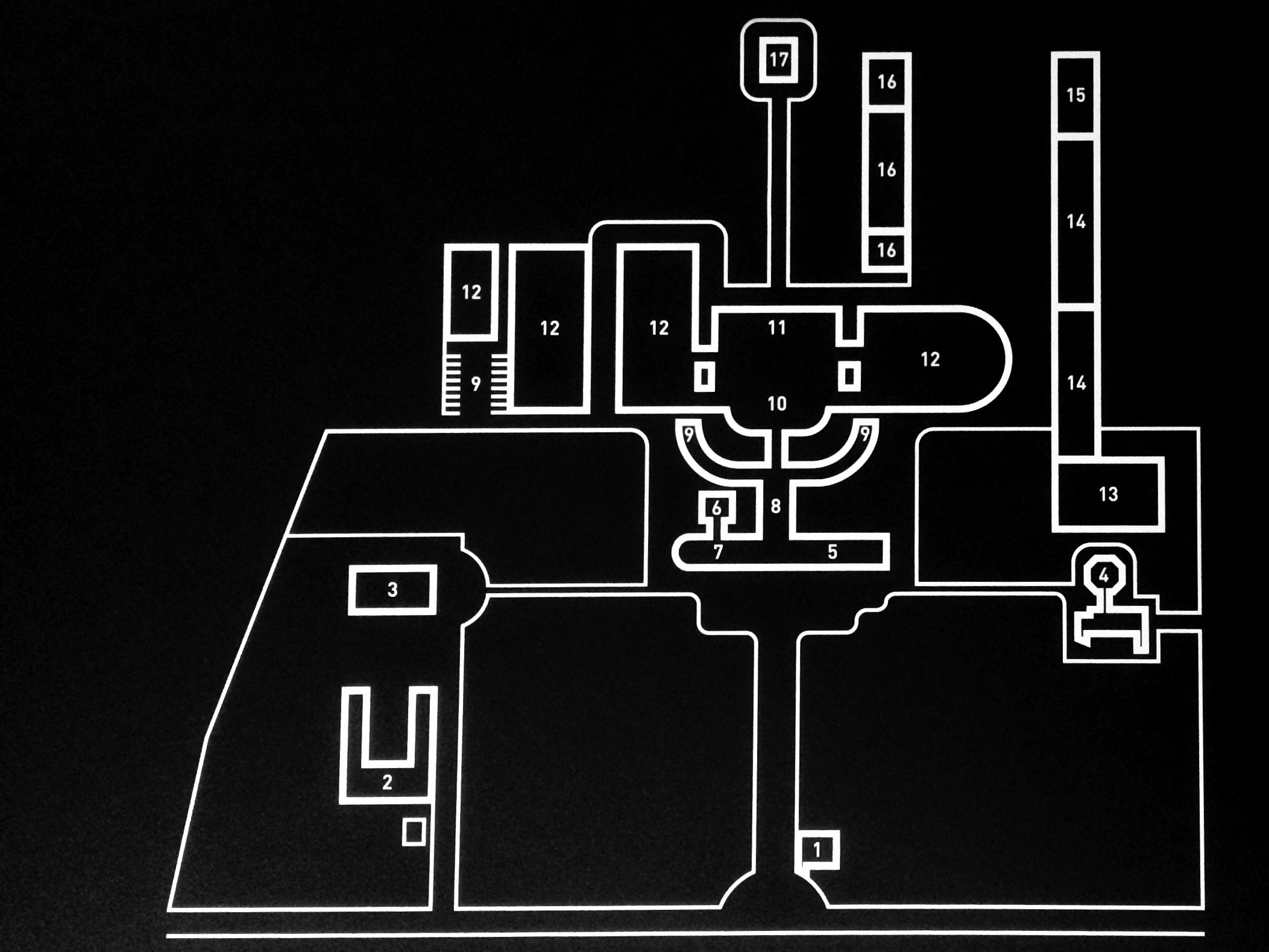

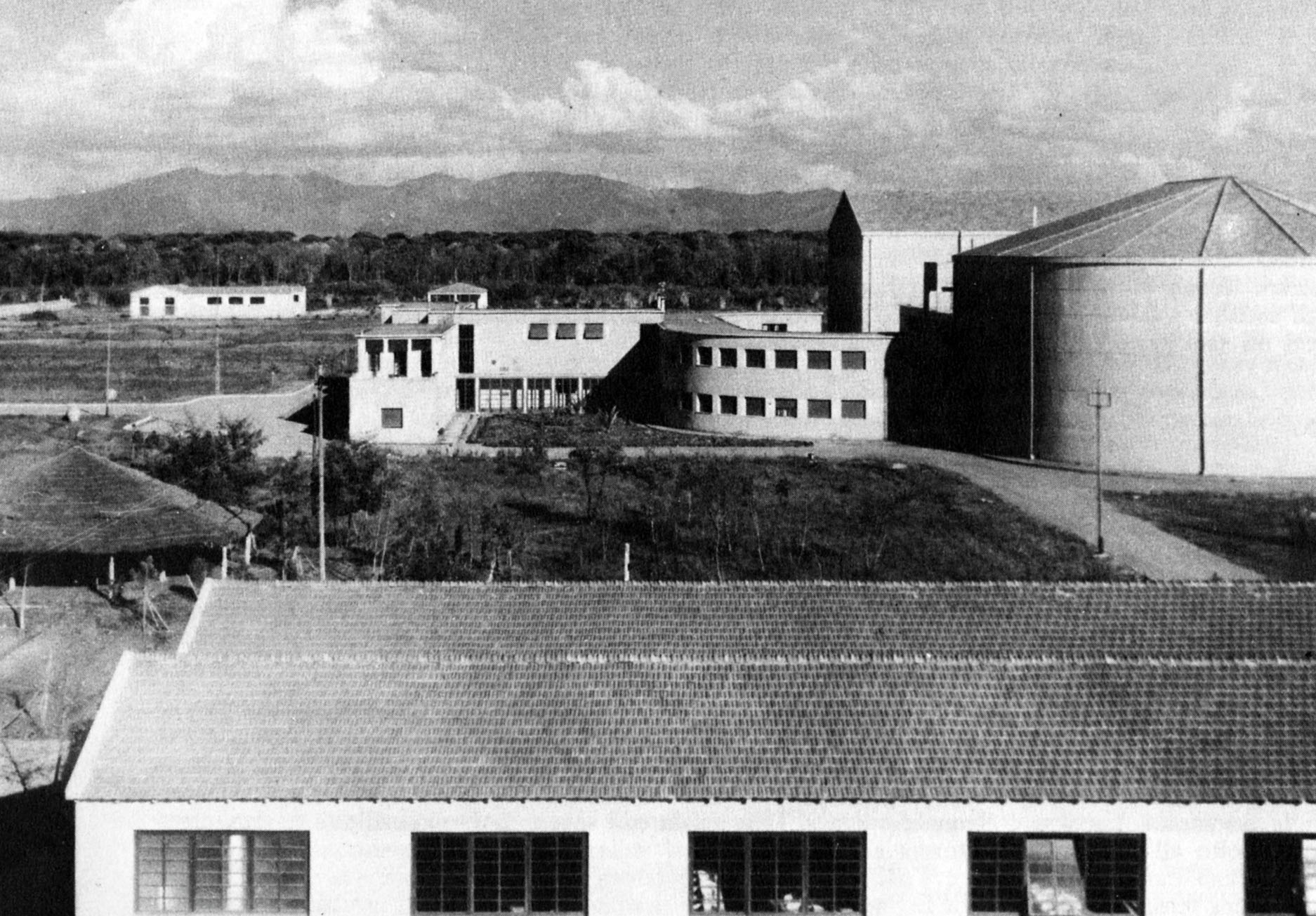

The Tirrenia Studios (also known at one point as the Pisorno Studios) are a film studio complex located in the Italian coastal town of Tirrenia in Tuscany. The studios were constructed between 1933-1934 and intended, along with the Fert Studios in Turin, to provide northern competition to the increasingly dominant Cines Studios in Rome. Tirrenia was a new town which had grown with the support of Italy's Fascist regime. Although Italian film production was booming following an early 1930s slump, Tirrenia quickly faced increasing competition from the large Cinecitta studios in Rome which had been opened in 1937 as part of the Fascist's attempt to centralise film production in the capital. Nonetheless, the studios continued to be used, sometimes facilitating location shooting nearby.

During the later stages of the Second World War the studios were requisitioned for other use first by the Germans and later by the Allies. In the post-war years the studios returned to film production, although this has been sporadic. In the 1960s the producer Carlo Ponti took over the studios.

== Selected filmography ==
Films made partly or wholly at the studios:

- The Divine Spark (1935)
- The Two Sergeants (1936)
- All of Life in One Night (1938)
- The Woman of Monte Carlo (1938)
- The Daughter of the Green Pirate (1940)
- Honeymoon (1941)
- The King of England Will Not Pay (1941)
- Idyll in Budapest (1941)
- Short Circuit (1943)
- Tragic Return (1952)

== Bibliography ==
- Forgacs, David & Gundle, Stephen. Mass Culture and Italian Society from Fascism to the Cold War. Indiana University Press, 2007.
