= Un giorno nella vita =

1946 film

- Film poster
- Directed by: Alessandro Blasetti
- Written by: Alessandro Blasetti; Mario Chiari; Diego Fabbri; Anton Giulio Majano; Cesare Zavattini
- Produced by: Salvo D'Angelo
- Starring: Mariella Lotti
- Cinematography: Mario Craveri
- Edited by: Gisa Radicchi Levi
- Music by: Enzo Masetti
- Production company: Orbis Films
- Distributed by: Compagnia Edizioni Internazionali Artistiche Distribuzione
- Release date: 5 April 1946
- Running time: 95 minutes
- Country: Italy
- Language: Italian

Un giorno nella vita ("A Day in Life") is a 1946 Italian war film directed by Alessandro Blasetti. It was entered into the 1946 Cannes Film Festival. American title: "A Day In the Life". This film was screened in 2009 at the Film Society of Lincoln Center's retrospective "Life Lessons" Italian Neorealism and the birth of modern cinema.

== Plot ==
A group of partisans seek refuge in a cloistered convent. The sisters reluctantly aid the ailing men, but not without terrible consequences. A day in the life offers an image of a big tent Italy, in which the differences that had earlier cleaved society, especially between the church and the political Left, are temporarily tabled for the higher cause of national unity.

== Cast ==
- Enzo Biliotti - Don Eusebio
- Elisa Cegani - Suor Maria
- Ada Colangeli - Suor Gaetana
- Ada Dondini - Madre Superiora
- Arnoldo Foà - Brusan
- Massimo Girotti - Luigi Monotti
- Flavia Grande - Suor Luisa
- Mariella Lotti - Suor Bianca
- Dante Maggio - Carlo
- Secondo Maronetto - Macchi
- Marcella Melnati - Suor Pace
- Luciano Mondolfo - Damiano Santoni
- Gino Mori - Rino
- Amedeo Nazzari - Captain De Palma
- Ave Ninchi - Suor Celeste
- Amalia Pellegrini - Suor Scolastica
- Adam Perkal - German Captain
- Antonio Pierfederici - Giovanni
- Rolando Purgatori - American doctor
- Goliarda Sapienza - Suor Speranza
- Dina Sassoli - Suor Teresa
