= Carnival of Venice (disambiguation) =

The Carnival of Venice is an annual festival held in Venice, Italy.

Carnival of Venice may also refer to:

- Carnival of Venice (song), a song based on a Neapolitan folk tune
- The Carnival of Venice (1939 film), an Italian comedy film
- The Carnival of Venice (1928 film), an Italian silent drama film
