= Measure for Measure (disambiguation) =

Measure for Measure is a play written by William Shakespeare.

Measure for Measure may also refer to:

- Measure for Measure (album), a 1986 studio album by Australian rock/synthpop band Icehouse
- Measure for Measure (1943 film), an Italian historical drama film directed by Marco Elter
- Measure for Measure (2020 film), an Australian drama film
- Measure for Measure, a 1979 BBC Television Shakespeare production
