= The Materassi Sisters =

- Directed by: Ferdinando Maria Poggioli
- Written by: Bernard Zimmer
- Based on: The Sisters Materassi by Aldo Palazzeschi
- Produced by: Sandro Ghenzi
- Starring: Emma Gramatica; Irma Gramatica; Olga Solbelli; Massimo Serato
- Cinematography: Arturo Gallea
- Edited by: Ferdinando Maria Poggioli
- Music by: Enzo Masetti
- Production company: Società Italiana Cines
- Distributed by: Universalcine
- Release date: 19 December 1944
- Running time: 72 minutes
- Country: Italy
- Language: Italian

The Materassi Sisters (Italian: Sorelle Materassi) is a 1944 Italian comedy film directed by Ferdinando Maria Poggioli and starring Emma Gramatica, Irma Gramatica and Olga Solbelli. The film is an adaptation of the 1934 novel of the same title by Aldo Palazzeschi. It was shot at the Cinecittà Studios in Rome.

== Cast ==
- Emma Gramatica as Carolina Materassi
- Irma Gramatica as Teresa Materassi
- Olga Solbelli as Giselda Materassi
- Massimo Serato as Remo, il nipote
- Clara Calamai as Peggy
- Dina Romano as Niobe, la domestica
- Paola Borboni as La principessa russa
- Anna Mari as Laurina
- Leo Melchiorri as Otello
- Loris Gizzi as Il sacerdote
- Ninì Imbornoni as La signora svedese
- Pietro Bigerna asGiorgio, il prestatore
- Margherita Bossi as La macellaia
- Amalia Pellegrini as La domestica della signora svedese
- Franco Cuppini as Il proprietario del salone automobili
- Carlo Giustini as L'amante della principessa russa

== Bibliography ==
- Reich, Jacqueline & Garofalo, Piero. Re-viewing Fascism: Italian Cinema, 1922-1943. Indiana University Press, 2002.
