= Perelà, uomo di fumo =

Perelà, uomo di fumo (Perelà, man of smoke) is an opera in ten chapters composed by Pascal Dusapin. Dusapin himself wrote the Italian libretto, based on the novel, Man of Smoke by the Italian Futurist writer, Aldo Palazzeschi. The opera had its world premiere on 24 February 2003 at the Opéra Bastille, conducted by James Conlon.

== Roles ==
Roles, voice types, premiere cast
Role	Voice type	Premiere cast, 24 February 2003 Conductor: James Conlon
Perelà	tenor	John Graham-Hall
Old woman	contralto	Martine Mahé
Marchesa Olivia di Bellonda	mezzo-soprano	Nora Gubisch
Alloro, a valet	bass	Scott Wilde
Alloro's daughter	coloratura soprano	Chantal Perraud
Pilone, a philosopher	bass	Gregory Reinhart
The Queen	soprano	Youngok Shin
The Archbishop	countertenor	Dominique Visse
Rodella, a banker	bass-baritone	Nicolas Courjal
President of the Tribunal	bass	Scott Wilde
The king's first guard	bass	Gregory Reinhart
The king's second guard	bass-baritone	Nicolas Courjal
The minister	bass	Jaco Huijpen
The chamberlain	bass	Jaco Huijpen
A parrot	countertenor	Daniel Gundlach

== Synopsis ==
The enigmatic protagonist, Perelà, is literally a man made of smoke, formed over thirty-three years in the chimney of a fireplace tended by three old women, Pena, Rete, and Lama. One day he finds the fireplace abandoned. He gives himself a name made up of the first syllable of the names of his "mothers" (Pe-Re-La), puts on a pair of boots that will anchor him to the ground, and sets off for a city that he sees on the horizon. On the way, he is met by an old woman and then by one of King Torlindao's guards who brings him to the royal court. Once there, everyone is fascinated by the strange story of his origin and by his "lightness", which they consider a unique gift. He is admired and feted by all. So much so, that the Queen and the king's minister ask him to devise a new legal code for their society, and a noblewoman who had previously sworn off men, Marchesa Oliva di Bellonda, falls in love with him. But one day, his fortunes change. The old valet, Alloro, sets himself on fire hoping to emulate the lightness of Perelà. The accusations by Alloro's daughter turn the people against Perelà whom they now revile as a murderer. The Marchesa tries to defend him, but he is condemned to prison. After singing a final oration, Perelà escapes by removing his boots and floating out through the chimney of his cell to become a moving form in the sky.
