= The Ten Commandments (1945 film) =

1945 film

- Directed by: Giorgio Walter Chili
- Written by: Giorgio Walter Chili; Diego Fabbri; Pietro Germi; Enrico Ribulsi; Callisto V. Vanzin
- Produced by: Giuseppe Gallia; Francesco Leoni
- Cinematography: Sergio Pesce
- Music by: Ezio Carabella
- Production company: Produzzione Film Religiosi
- Distributed by: Fincine
- Release date: August 1945
- Running time: 102 minutes
- Country: Italy
- Language: Italian

The Ten Commandments (Italian: I dieci comandamenti) is a 1945 Italian drama film directed by Giorgio Walter Chili. It features an ensemble of Italian actors in episodes based on the Ten Commandments.

It was made during the German occupation of Rome, which brought a halt to all ongoing work at Italian film studios. Only two films made with Vatican support went into production at the time, providing employment for actors and technicians. The other film was Vittorio De Sica's The Gates of Heaven. Their work on the films enabled them to refuse demands that they relocate north to work in the Venice-based film industry of the puppet Italian Social Republic. The lengthy production process meant that it wasn't released until long after Rome had been liberated by Allied forces.

== Cast ==
- Marina Berti as (segment "Non desiderare la roba d'altri")
- Carlo Campanini as (segment "Non desiderare la roba d'altri")
- Delia Brandi as (segment "Non desiderare la roba d'altri")
- Amedeo Nazzari as (segment "Non desiderare la donna d'altri")
- Germana Paolieri as (segment "Non desiderare la donna d'altri")
- Elisa Cegani as (segment "Non dire falsa testimonianza")
- Claudio Gora as (segment "Non dire falsa testimonianza")
- Assia Noris as (segment "Non rubare")
- Otello Toso as (segment "Non rubare")
- Carlo Romano as (segment "Non rubare")
- Rossano Brazzi as (segment "Non commettere atti impuri")
- Loretta Lisi as (segment "Non commettere atti impuri")
- Roldano Lupi as (segment "Non ammazzare")
- Delia Orman as (segment "Non ammazzare")
- Nino Pavese as (segment "Non ammazzare")
- Aldo Silvani as (segment "Non ammazzare")
- Vera Carmi as (segment "Onora il padre e la madre")
- Ada Dondini as (segment "Onora il padre e la madre")
- Ugo Sasso as (segment "Onora il padre e la madre")
- Cesco Baseggio as (segment "Onora il padre e la madre")
- Luigi Pavese as (segment "Onora il padre e la madre")
- Bella Starace Sainati as (segment "Onora il padre e la madre")
- Massimo Girotti as (segment "Ricordati di santificare le feste")
- Mariella Lotti as (segment "Ricordati di santificare le feste")
- Valentina Cortese as (segment "Non nominare il nome di Dio invano")
- Andrea Checchi as (segment "Non nominare il nome di Dio invano")
- Adele Garavaglia as (segment "Non nominare il nome di Dio invano")
- Carlo Ninchi as (segment "Io sono il Signore Dio tuo")
- Bianca Manenti as (segment "Io sono il Signore Dio tuo")
- Ciro Berardi
- Lorena Berg
- Elvira Betrone
- Arturo Bragaglia
- Ennio Cerlesi
- Giorgio De Lullo
- Dino Di Luca
- Franca Dominici
- Mario Ferrari
- Guido Garavaglia
- Fedele Gentile
- Loris Gizzi
- Giovanni Grasso
- Nino Marchesini
- Maria Marengo
- Guido Notari
- Amalia Pellegrini
- Amilcare Pettinelli
- Giuseppe Porelli
- Franco Pucci
- Gina Ror
- Giovanna Scotto
- Carlo Tamberlani
- Amedeo Trilli
