= Fabiola (1949 film) =

- Theatrical release poster
- Directed by: Alessandro Blasetti
- Produced by: Salvo D'Angelo
- Starring: Michèle Morgan; Henri Vidal; Michel Simon
- Cinematography: Mario Craveri; Ubaldo Marelli
- Edited by: Mario Serandrei
- Music by: Enzo Masetti
- Production companies: Universalia Film; Filmsonor Productions
- Distributed by: Warner Bros.
- Release dates: 3 March 1949; 1951 (UK & U.S.)
- Running time: 164 min
- Countries: Italy; France
- Language: Italian
- Budget: US$700,000 (est)

Fabiola (UK title: The Fighting Gladiator) is a 1949 Italian language motion picture historical drama directed by Alessandro Blasetti, very loosely based on the 1854 novel Fabiola by Nicholas Patrick Wiseman. The film stars Michèle Morgan, Henri Vidal and Michel Simon. It tells the story of the Roman Empire in which Christianity is growing around the 4th century AD. An unofficial remake, The Revolt of the Slaves (La Rivolta degli Schiavi), was released in 1960, with Lang Jeffries and Rhonda Fleming, only with Rhual's name changed to Vibio.

== Plot ==
In ancient Rome a love story blossoms between Fabiola, daughter of a senator, and Rhual, a Gallic gladiator. When Fabiola's father is killed, the Romans blame the Christians, and the persecution begins. Rhual confesses to being a Christian and is accused of the murder and sentenced to fight to the death in the arena.

312 AD. Rhual, a young and athletic Gaul, is invited to take part in the gladiator games at the seaside villa of Senator Fabius Severus, near Rome. Secretly, Rhual is an agent of Emperor Constantine, who wishes to establish Christianity in the Roman Empire, and Fabius is leading a movement for religious tolerance and the freeing of slaves. In the villa gardens, Rhual meets and falls in love with a beautiful girl whom he later discovers to be Fabiola, the senator's daughter. Fabius is murdered during the night by reactionary politicians opposed to Christianity, and the Christians are blamed for the murder. Fabiola suspects Rhual to be one of the Christian assassins, but at their trial he appears in their defence. However, the Christians, together with Rhual, are found guilty and sentenced to death in the arena. So begin the persecutions during which many Christians are killed or imprisoned. The centurion Sebastian of the Praetorian Guard, denounced as a Christian, dies as a martyr. Fabiola obtains Rhual's freedom, but he at first rejects her. The situation is redeemed, however, when Fabiola declares herself to be on the side of the Christians and joins them in the arena, thereby indicating they were not responsible for her father's death. Rhual is forced to fight several gladiators but does not attempt to kill them. Eventually, the gladiators follow his example and throw down their arms. Meanwhile, the advance troops of Constantine arrive at the city walls, and there is a general uprising. Peace returns to Rome, and the imperial banners display the sign of Christ.

== Principal cast ==
- Michèle Morgan as Fabiola
- Henri Vidal as Rual
- Michel Simon as Fabio
- Louis Salou as Fulvio
- Elisa Cegani as Sira
- Massimo Girotti as Sebastiano
- Gino Cervi as Quadrato
- Sergio Tofano as Luciano
- Rina Morelli as Faustina
- Paolo Stoppa as Manlio Valerio
- Carlo Ninchi as Galba
- Franco Interlenghi as Corvino
- Guglielmo Barnabò as Antonio Leto
- Aldo Silvani as Cassiano
- Silvana Jachino as Lucilla
- Goliarda Sapienza as Cecilia
- Virgilio Riento as Pietro
- Ludmilla Dudarova as Giulia
- Gabriele Ferzetti as Claudio
- Nerio Bernardi as Imperial messenger

== Reception ==
Film critic Manny Farber in the September 1, 1951, issue of The Nation wrote: "Fabiola [concerns] Christian tribulations in the time of Constantine the Great. A two-hour chaos of disconnected sequences snipped more or less at random from a much longer French production. English dubbed in; livestock by Barnum; male and female costumes by Claire McCardell; lighting by Mr. Moon."

The film earned an estimated $1,050,000 in rentals at the US box office in 1951.

== See also ==
- List of historical drama films
- List of films set in ancient Rome

== Sources ==
- Farber, Manny. 2009. Farber on Film: The Complete Film Writings of Manny Farber. Edited by Robert Polito. Library of America. ISBN 978-1-59853-050-6
