= Enzo Masetti =

Italian composer

Enzo Masetti (1893–1961) was an Italian composer.

== Selected filmography ==
- Cavalry (1936)
- Tomb of the Angels (1937)
- Goodbye Youth (1940)
- Blood Wedding (1941)
- Old-Fashioned World (1941)
- Headlights in the Fog (1942)
- The Gorgon (1942)
- Jealousy (1942)
- Farewell Love! (1943)
- The Priest's Hat (1944)
- The Materassi Sisters (1944)
- The Gates of Heaven (1945)
- A Day In the Life (1946)
- The Testimony (1946)
- The Adulteress (1946)
- Bullet for Stefano (1947)
- Heart and Soul (1948)
- Fabiola (1949)
- The Wolf of the Sila (1949)
- Sicilian Uprising (1949)
- Outlaw Girl (1950)
- Volcano (1950)
- Hearts at Sea (1950)
- The Fighting Men (1950)
- Il caimano del Piave (1951)
- Last Meeting (1951)
- Red Shirts (1952)
- Voice of Silence (1953)
- Attila (1954)
- Hercules (1958)
- Hercules Unchained (1959)
