= Measure for Measure (1943 film) =

1943 Italian film by Marco Elter

- Directed by: Marco Elter
- Written by: Guglielmo Usellini; Enrico Ribulsi
- Starring: Carlo Tamberlani; Caterina Boratto
- Cinematography: Antonio Marzari
- Music by: Giovanni Fusco
- Release date: 3 February 1943
- Language: Italian

Measure for Measure (Italian: Dente per dente, literally "A tooth for a tooth") is a 1943 Italian historical drama film directed by Marco Elter and starring Carlo Tamberlani, Caterina Boratto and Nelly Corradi. It is based on the William Shakespeare's play of the same name.

== Cast ==
- Carlo Tamberlani as Angelo
- Caterina Boratto as Isabella
- Nelly Corradi as Marianna
- Loredana as Giulietta
- Memo Benassi as Lucio
- Osvaldo Genazzani as Claudio
- Alfredo Varelli as Vincenzo
- Cesco Baseggio as Schiumetta
- Lamberto Picasso as La Scala
- Amelia Chellini as Madama La Spanata
- Claudio Ermelli
- Arturo Bragaglia
- Federico Collino
- Aldo Silvani
- Amalia Pellegrini
