= Man of Smoke =

1911 novel by Aldo Palazzeschi

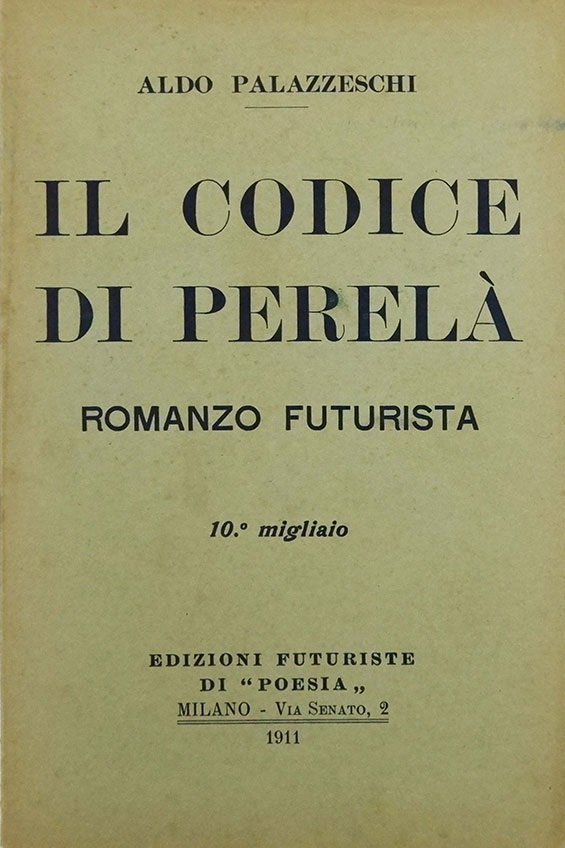
- Author: Aldo Palazzeschi
- Original title: Il codice di Perelà
- Language: Italian
- Publisher: Edizioni futuriste di Poesia
- Publication date: 1911
- Publication place: Italy
- English publication date: 1936
- Pages: 277

Man of Smoke (Italian: Il codice di Perelà, lit. 'The Code of Perelà') is a novel by the Italian writer Aldo Palazzeschi, first published by Edizioni futuriste di Poesia in 1911 and revised by the author in 1920, 1943 and 1954. The novel is a futurist social satire about a man who is made of light smoke, initially received as a bringer of a golden age and tasked with creating a new legal code, before the public turns against him. No legal code is laid out by the main character, but critics have discussed the possible existence of an enciphered code between the lines of the novel. Critical response has emphasised the novel's social themes and sense of humour.

== Plot ==
The novel is about the man Perelà, who is made of light smoke and appears by going down a chimney in a city at the age of 33. Dressed in a pair of boots he found next to the fireplace, he is discovered by the king's soldiers and interrogated. He receives his name from the first syllables in the names of three centenarian women he keeps repeating: Pena, Rete and Lama (lit. 'Pain', 'Net' and 'Blade'). Perelà says the women taught him everything he knows and he decided to come down because he could no longer feel their fire or hear their voices.

Brought to the royal court, he is received as a revelation and a purifying force, due to his creation from fire and simple message of "lightness". He gets to meet various dignitaries and quickly gains an enthusiastic following among people and rulers, who regard him as a bringer of a golden age, sent by divine providence, although he barely says anything and does nothing at his own initiative. Especially one woman, Oliva di Bellonda, regards him as the soulmate she always has searched for. The king, Torlindao, gives Perelà the task of creating a new legal code for the kingdom to follow. To prepare the code, Perelà visits various places in the city and meets people of different social statuses, including two nuns of whom one is a repentant sinner and the other a virgin, the cemetery, the Meadow of Love, the prison where the former king is kept and a mental asylum.

The excitement dies and people become hostile to Perelà when an old palace servant, Alloro, commits suicide by fire in a failed attempt to also become a man made of smoke. Perelà's indifference to Alloro's death, and his own role in inspiring the man's action, arouses anger. Perelà is put on trial, where he only responds to accusations by saying "I am light", and sentenced to life in prison. He is mocked and humiliated by the public on his way to his punishment. Oliva has been able to convince the king to let Perelà have a small fireplace in the cell. Upon entering the cell, Perelà takes off his boots, goes into the fireplace and disappears as a cloud of smoke in the sky, after which Oliva dies of heartbreak.

== Major themes ==
The literary scholar Anthony Julian Tamburri describes the novel as anti-realist and as an allegory about how strict norms and conventions make it impossible for a man like Perelà to participate in society. Although Perelà never lays out any legal code in the novel, literary critics, notably Luigi Baldacci, have argued that there is such a code hidden between the lines, and that the novel makes a point about how the public fails to perceive this. Tamburri writes that the novel tasks the reader with piecing together the fragments of Perelà's code, which is enciphered throughout the story's characters and episodes.

Tamburri regards Man of Smoke as an outline for Palazzeschi's later futurist manifesto Il controdolore (lit. 'The Counter-pain'). The literary scholar Stephen Marth has argued that the way people in the novel impose what they desire on Perelà is reminiscent of how Palazzeschi in his 1945 book Tre imperi... mancati; cronaca 1922–1945 (lit. 'Three Failed Empires: Chronicles 1922–1945') described how he thought people had imposed their own ideas on Benito Mussolini, co-creating Il Duce as a fictional character.

== Publication ==
Man of Smoke was first published in Italy in 1911 by Edizioni futuriste di Poesia. Palazzeschi made revised versions published in 1920, 1943 and 1954. The first three versions were published as Il codice di Perelà (lit. 'The Code of Perelà') and the fourth as Perelà uomo di fumo (lit. 'Perelà Man of Smoke'). A version in English by Peter M. Riccio, titled Perela: The Man of Smoke and described as an adaptation, was published in 1936. Italica Press published an English translation by Nicolas J. Perella and Ruggero Stefanini in 1992.

== Reception ==
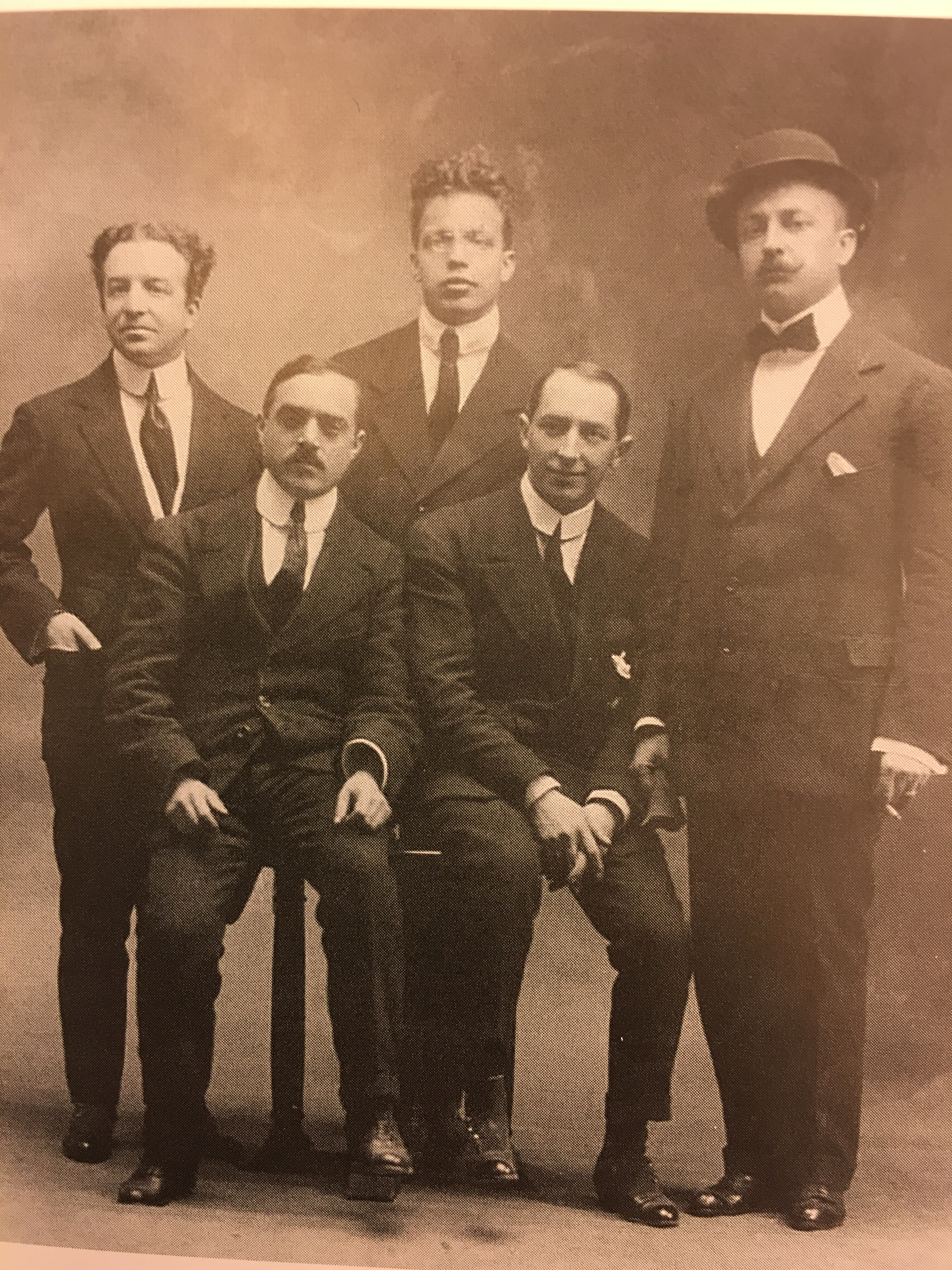
Group photo of prominent futurists, from left to right: Aldo Palazzeschi, Umberto Boccioni, Giovanni Papini, Carlo Carrà and Filippo Tommaso Marinetti

There are few futurist novels, and along with Mafarka the Futurist by Filippo Tommaso Marinetti, Man of Smoke is the one that has received the most attention over the years. In 1992, Publishers Weekly called it a "rewarding and critically important modernist tale" with "deft social commentary and irony". In Italica, Paschal Viglionese highlighted allusions to Inferno and The Decameron and how the book combines serious social themes with "the comic, the irreverent, the bizarre, and the grotesque". Tamburri writes that Man of Smoke contrasts greatly to the conventional Italian literature of its time, a trait it shares with the poetry Palazzeschi otherwise was known for, to which the novel works as a companion piece.

== Adaptation ==
The book was the basis for the opera Perelà, uomo di fumo composed by Pascal Dusapin, which premiered in 2003.
