= Edda Albertini =

Italian actress (1926–1988)

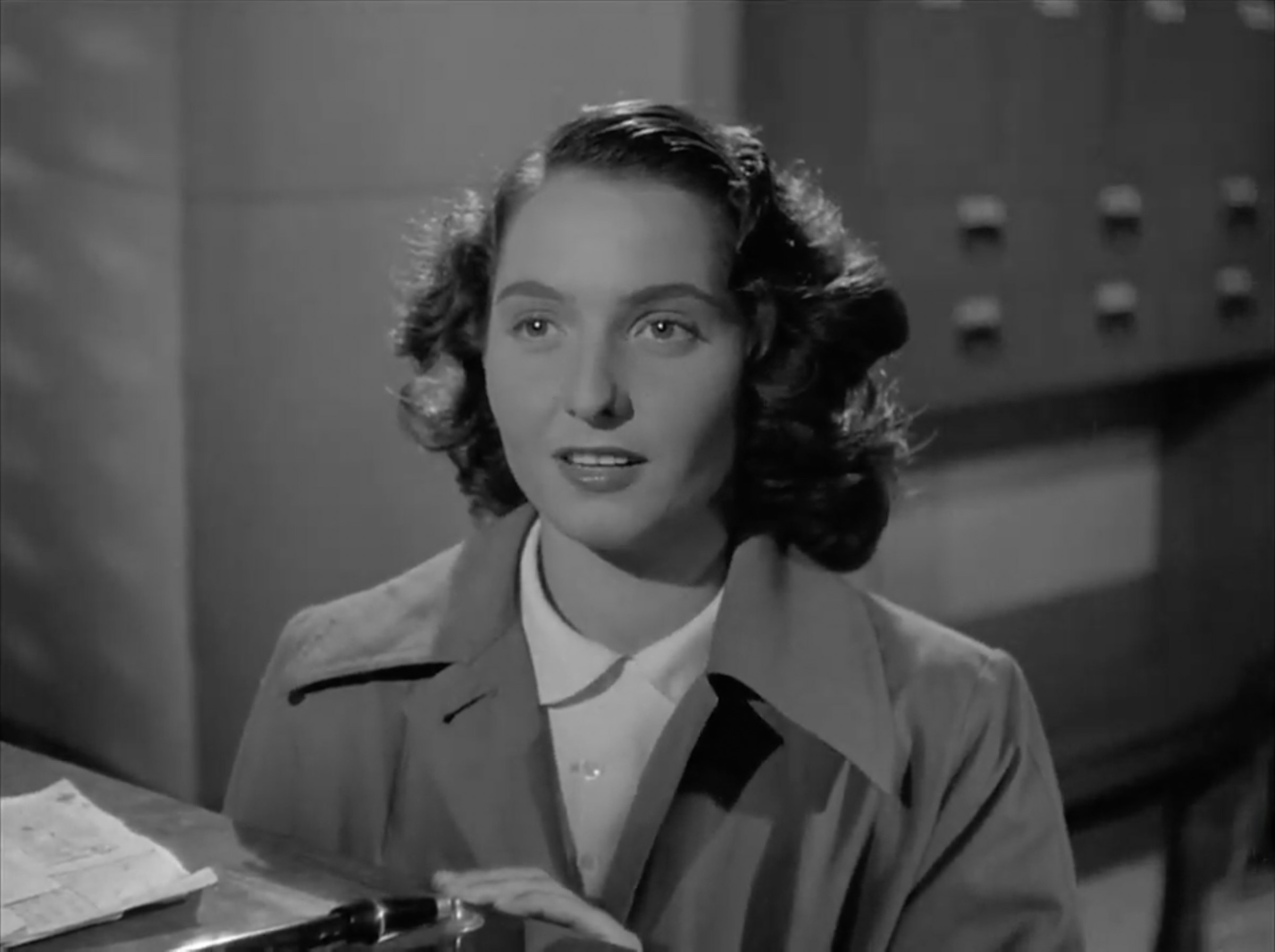
- Albertini in Fugitive in Trieste (1951)
- Born: 21 May 1926; Trento, Trentino-Alto Adige, Italy
- Died: 14 January 1988 (aged 61); Rome, Lazio, Italy
- Occupation: Actress
- Years active: 1946–1981 (film & TV)

Edda Albertini (1926–1988) was an Italian film, stage and television actress. In the postwar years she appeared in several films in supporting roles and played the lead in The Monastery of Santa Chiara (1949). Subsequently, her screen appearances were mainly in television. She was a graduate of the Academy of Dramatic Arts in Rome.

== Selected filmography ==
- Before Him All Rome Trembled (1946)
- Biraghin (1946)
- Fire Over the Sea (1947)
- The Monastery of Santa Chiara (1949)
- Fugitive in Trieste (1951)
- The Queen of Sheba (1952)
- The Thirteen Chairs (1969)

== Bibliography ==
- Bayman, Louis. The Operatic and the Everyday in Postwar Italian Film Melodrama. Edinburgh University Press, 2014.
- Goble, Alan. The Complete Index to Literary Sources in Film. Walter de Gruyter, 1999.
