= Bellissima (film) =

- Theatrical release poster
- Directed by: Luchino Visconti
- Written by: Cesare Zavattini; Suso Cecchi d'Amico; Francesco Rosi; Luchino Visconti
- Produced by: Salvo D'Angelo
- Starring: Anna Magnani; Walter Chiari; Tina Apicella; Gastone Renzelli; Tecla Scarano; Arturo Bragaglia; Alessandro Blasetti
- Cinematography: Piero Portalupi
- Edited by: Mario Serandrei
- Music by: Franco Mannino, inspired by Donizetti's L'elisir d'amore
- Production company: Film Bellissima
- Distributed by: CEI Incom
- Release date: 27 December 1951
- Running time: 115 minutes
- Country: Italy
- Language: Italian
- Box office: $6,800

Bellissima is a 1951 Italian drama film directed by Luchino Visconti and starring Anna Magnani, Walter Chiari and Tecla Scarano. In 2008, the film was included on the Italian Ministry of Cultural Heritage’s 100 Italian films to be saved, a list of 100 films that "have changed the collective memory of the country between 1942 and 1978."

== Plot ==
Bellissima centers on a working-class mother in Rome, Maddalena, who drags her young daughter to Cinecittà Studios to attend an audition for a new film by Alessandro Blasetti. Maddalena's efforts to promote her daughter grow increasingly frenzied.

== Cast ==
- Anna Magnani as Maddalena Cecconi
- Walter Chiari as Alberto Annovazzi
- Tina Apicella as Maria Cecconi
- Gastone Renzelli as Spartaco Cecconi
- Tecla Scarano as Tilde Spernanzoni
- Lola Braccini as the photographer's wife
- Arturo Bragaglia as the photographer
- Nora Ricci as the laundry girl
- Vittorina Benvenuti
- Linda Sini as Mimmetta
- Teresa Battaggi as a mother
- Gisella Monaldi as a concierge
- Amalia Pellegrini
- Corrado Mantoni as radio announcer

== Production ==
Alessandro Blasetti, a contemporary film director, appears as himself. Keeping in with the tradition of Italian neorealism a number of roles went to members of the public. Magnani played a part in their selection, approving of Gastone Renzelli a butcher who was cast as her husband.

The film's sets were designed by Gianni Polidori. It was shot at the Cinecittà Studios, which appear prominently in the film. It was not a box office success.

== Reception ==
On the review aggregator website Rotten Tomatoes, 80% of 5 critics' reviews are positive.

== Awards ==
- Nastro d'Argento for Best Actress Anna Magnani

== Bibliography ==
- Gundle, Stephen (4 November 2019). Fame Amid the Ruins: Italian Film Stardom in the Age of Neorealism. Berghahn Books. ISBN 9781789200010.
