= Cesco Baseggio =

Italian stage, film and television actor

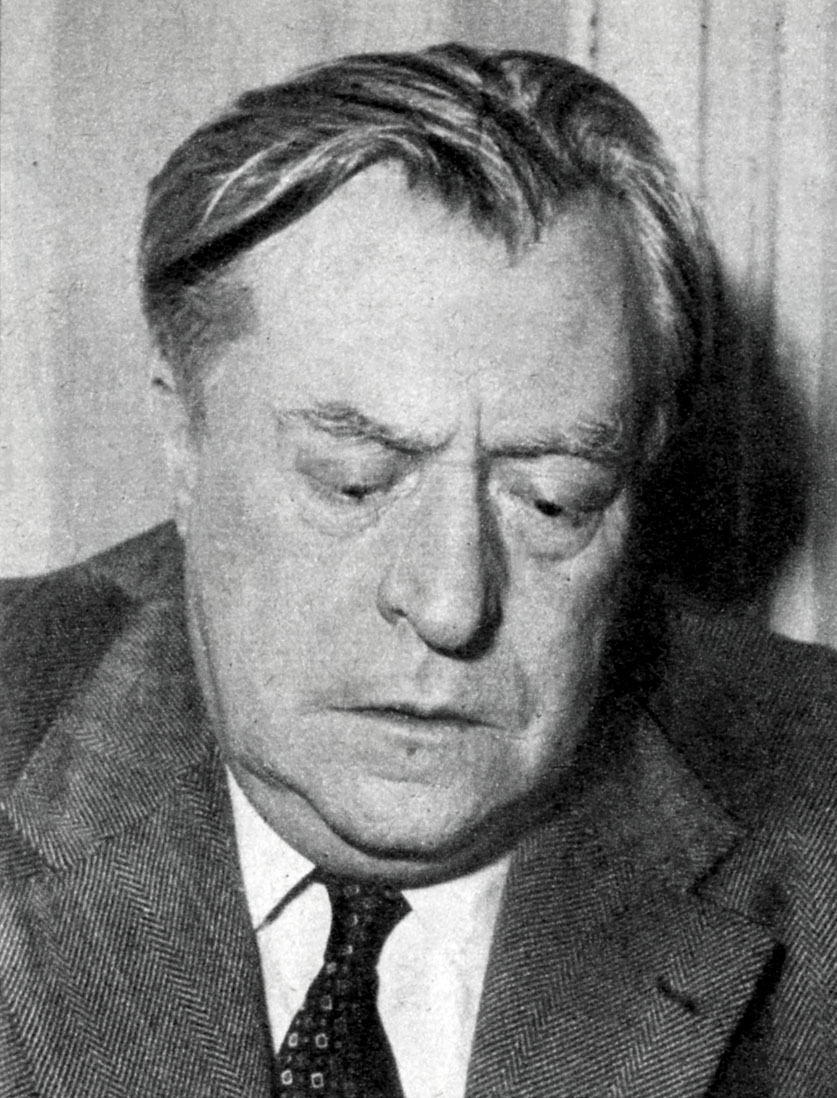
- Baseggio in 1957
- Born: Francesco Baseggio; 13 April 1897; Venice, Veneto; Italy
- Died: 22 January 1971 (aged 73); Catania, Sicily; Italy
- Occupation: Actor
- Years active: 1935 - 1968 (film)

Francesco "Cesco" Baseggio (1897–1971) was an Italian stage, film and television actor. He was born in Venice, and was identified with Venetian roles during his film career. He appeared in a mixture of serious, dramatic films, as well as comedies such as The Brambilla Family Go on Holiday (1941). On the stage he frequently appeared in plays by Carlo Goldoni.

== Life and career ==
Baseggio started his career at 16 years old in an amateur theater society. He took part in the WWI, where he served in the military engineering corps and later as director of Teatri del Soldato ('Soldier Theaters') in Albania. After the war he worked in the Ars Veneta and Carlo Micheluzzi's companies, before forming his own company in 1926.

In 1935 Baseggio started his film career, mostly consisting of supporting and character roles. In 1936 he entered the Carlo Goldoni-specialized Compagnia del Teatro di Venezia, with which he achieved his major personal critical accomplishments. After the World War II, he started a critically acclaimed collaboration with Giorgio Strehler. He also worked as a stage director, a playwright of comedies in Venetian language, and a voice actor.

== Filmography ==
Year	Title	Role	Notes
1935	Le scarpe al sole	Durigan	
1937	Bertoldo, Bertoldino e Cacasenno	Bertoldo	
1937	Nina non far la stupida	Il podestà	
1938	The Black Corsair	Van Stiller - Korsar	
1938	Giuseppe Verdi	Papà Verdi	
1939	The Widow	Anselmo	
1939	The Carnival of Venice	Momolo	
1940	Scandalo per bene	Un servitore di casa Contarini	
1940	Mare	Zane	
1940	Piccolo alpino	L'alpino Brustolon	
1940	Il sogno di tutti	Il padrone di casa	
1941	Orizzonte dipinto	Parodi	
1941	Pia de' Tolomei	Matteo	
1941	The Brambilla Family Go on Holiday	Ambrogio Brambilla	
1942	I sette peccati	Il profesore Barni	
1942	Angelo del crepuscolo	Matteo	
1942	Notte di fiamme		
1943	Measure for Measure	Schiumetta	
1943	Dagli Appennini alle Ande	Il vecchio matto	
1943	Men of the Mountain	Il maggiore	
1943	Annabella's Adventure	Lo zio di Roberto	
1943	Gian Burrasca	Il signor Stoppani	
1943	Canal grande	Menego	
1943	La moglie in castigo	Il notaio Bardi	
1944	Finalmente sì	Il conte padre	
1945	Fatto di cronaca		
1945	La buona fortuna	Anselmo	
1945	The Ten Commandments		(segment "Onora il padre e la madre")
1945	L'angelo del miracolo		
1945	Trent'anni di servizio		
1946	Paese senza pace	Padron Fortunato	
1949	The Merry Widower	Il suocero	
1950	The White Line	Giovanni Sebastian	
1951	Arrivano i nostri	Il colonello	
1953	I Chose Love		
1955	The Barber of Seville	Dr. Bartolo	
1956	The Intruder	Father Peppino	
1957	Kean: Genius or Scoundrel	Salomon	

== Bibliography ==
- Brunetta, Gian Piero. The History of Italian Cinema: A Guide to Italian Film from Its Origins to the Twenty-first Century. Princeton University Press, 2009.
