= Salvo D'Angelo =

Italian film producer

- Salvo d'Angelo portrayed during the filming of Fabiola in May 1949.
- Born: 6 August 1909; Catania (Italy)
- Died: 22 September 1989 (aged 80); Florence, Italy
- Occupations: Producer, Art director
- Years active: 1937–1959 (film)

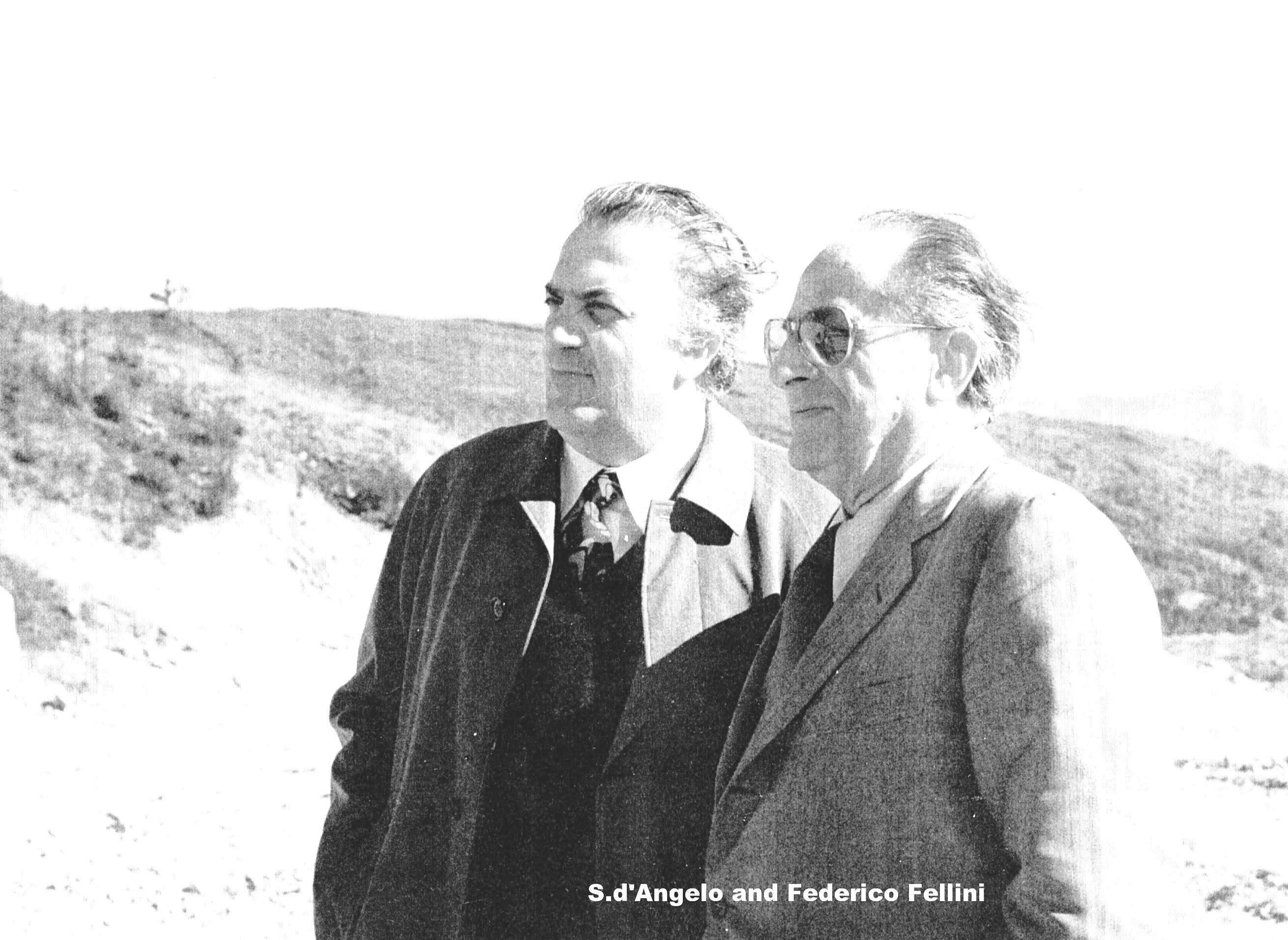
Federico Fellini and Salvo d'Angelo at the latter's villa in Santa Brigida (Florence) (1972)

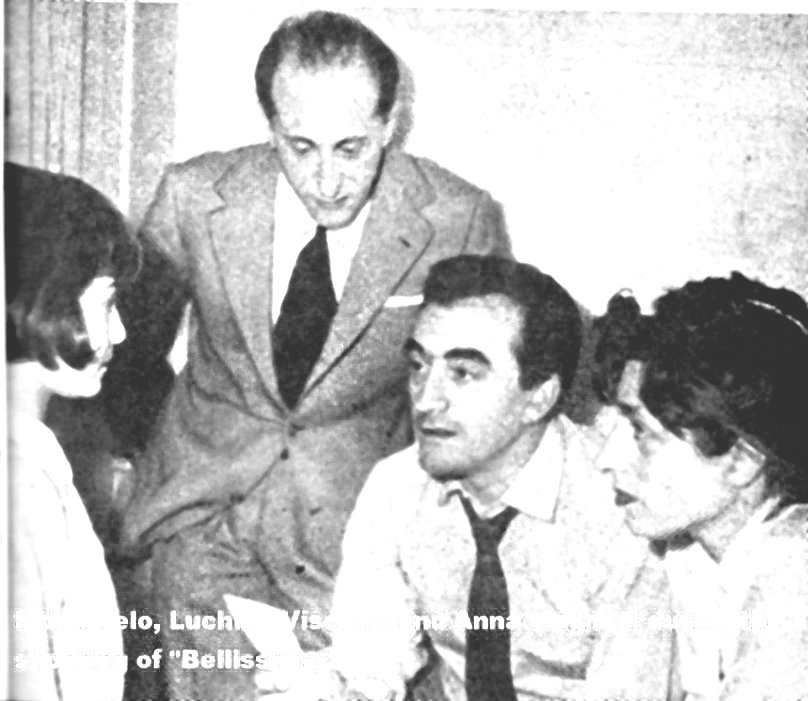
Salvo d'Angelo is seen here with director Luchino Visconti and actress Anna Magnani during a filming rehearsal of "Bellissima" in 1951

Salvo D'Angelo was an Italian film producer. He also worked as an art director and production designer.

== Selected filmography ==
- All of Life in One Night (1938)
- Star of the Sea (1938)
- It Always Ends That Way (1939)
- The Sons of the Marquis Lucera (1939)
- Diamonds (1939)
- Inspector Vargas (1940)
- The Secret of Villa Paradiso (1940)
- Bengasi (1942)
- Mist on the Sea (1944)
- The Gates of Heaven (1945)
- The Testimony (1946)
- Un giorno nella vita (1946)
- Daniele Cortis (1947)
- La Terra Trema (1948)
- Guarany (1948)
- Germany, Year Zero (1948)
- Fabiola (1949)
- Beauty and the Devil (1950)
- Father's Dilemma (1950)
- The Last Days of Pompeii (1950)
- Bellissima (1951)
- The Machine That Kills Bad People (1952)

== Bibliography ==
- Manuel Palacio & Jörg Türschmann. Transnational Cinema in Europe. LIT Verlag Münster, 2013.

== Biography ==
'Salvo d'Angelo', an architecture graduate, was initially active in motion pictures as a decorator in the late thirties, and eventually became a film producer, starting with documentaries, most of them on behalf of the Vatican, which were awarded important prizes at the Venice and Cannes International Film Festivals. This encouraged him to set up his own company, _Universalia_. He was one of the first to recognize the genius of Luchino Visconti, Roberto Rossellini and Vittorio De Sica, producing their early films (La Terra Trema (1948) for Visconti, _Germania anno zero (1947)_, for Rossellini, and _Porta del cielo, La (1946)_ for De Sica). Visconti's 'Terra Trema' screenplay was refused by all producers at the time, as they felt it would hardly be a box-office hit. Salvo d'Angelo was the only one who believed that Visconti (who had made at that point just one film) would make it a great movie that would eventually repay its cost. That proved to be true: the film was awarded the Silver Lion at the Venice International Film Festival and has been presented consistently in many countries in the past 54 years of its life (it was made in 1947). 'Terra trema' has been hailed one of the greatest art films of all time. D'Angelo was the first Italian producer starting co-productions with the French motion picture industry, and the result was Fabiola (1949) directed by Alessandro Blasetti and starring 'Michèle Morgan', 'Henri Vidal' and 'Michel Simon', with a strong social and historical message. Next came Beauty and the Devil (1950) directed by the celebrated René Clair and starring Gérard Philipeand Michel Simon. The première of this film took place at the Paris Opera House and was attended by the President of the Republic of France, Vincent Auriol.

In 1951 D'Angelo' proposed to Luchino Visconti to make a movie (Beautiful (1951)) with the greatest Italian star of the time, 'Anna Magnani', it was the story of a mother who wants at all costs her little daughter to win a competition for a role in a movie. Her illusions, even when her daughter is finally selected by the director (Alessandro Blasetti playing himself), will collapse when she discovers the harsh reality behind the glamor of motion pictures. Salvo d'Angelo was the first to believe in and help Franco Zeffirelli, Francesco Rosi (both were hired to be Visconti's assistants for 'Terra Trema' and 'Bellissima') and other directors and actors, like Vittorio Gassman, who later became world famous. He never produced his films by looking first and foremost at the box office, for his prime considerations were always quality and contents.

His mark as a producer of Italian motion pictures has been publicly recognized, among others, by Federico Fellini, Vittorio De Sica, Alessandro Blasetti, Roberto Rosselliniand Giorgio Strehler as well as by the press. His films are still part of the collections kept in many cine clubs both in Italy and abroad.

Mini Biography By his son: Bruno d'Angelo
