= Michele Galdieri =

Italian dramaturge, lyricist, screenwriter and writer

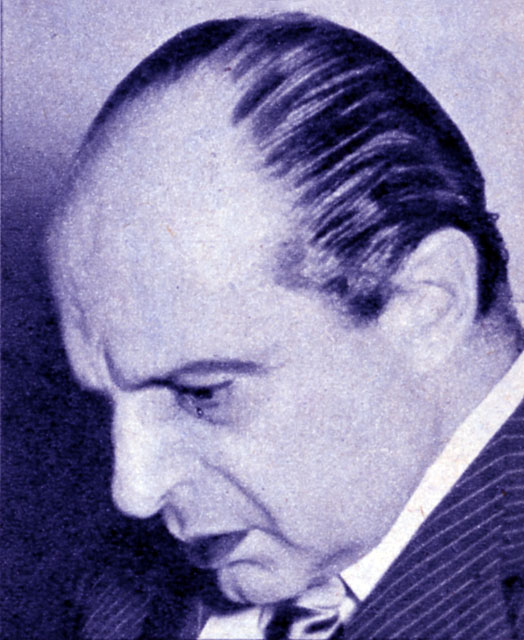
- Born: 18 November 1902; Naples, Campania, Italy
- Died: 30 November 1965 (aged 63); Naples, Campania, Italy
- Occupation: Screenwriter
- Years active: 1932–1955 (film)

Michele Galdieri (1902–1965) was an Italian screenwriter, songwriter and lyricist. Along with Giovanni D'Anzi, he composed the popular song Mattinata fiorentina (Morning Florence) for the 1941 revue Sometimes It's Nice to Go on Foot.

== Selected filmography ==
- Three Lucky Fools (1932)
- Five to Nil (1932)
- Father For a Night (1939)
- Baron Carlo Mazza (1948)
- The Monastery of Santa Chiara (1949)
- Tears of Love (1954)

== Bibliography ==
- Miguel Mera & David Burnand. European Film Music. Ashgate Publishing, 2006.
