= The Corsican Brothers (1961 film) =

- Directed by: Anton Giulio Majano
- Written by: Alexandre Dumas (story); Roberto Gianviti; Fulvio Palmieri; Bruno Guillaume; Diego Fabbri; Paul Andréota; Anton Giulio Majano
- Produced by: Leo Cevenini; Georges Cheyko; Vittorio Martino
- Starring: Geoffrey Horne; Valérie Lagrange; Gérard Barray
- Cinematography: Bitto Albertini
- Edited by: Georges Arnstam; Adriana Novelli
- Music by: Angelo Francesco Lavagnino
- Production company: Flora Film
- Distributed by: Variety Distribution
- Release date: December 22, 1961
- Running time: 85 minutes
- Countries: France; Italy
- Language: Italian
- Box office: 1,464,409 admissions (France)

The Corsican Brothers (Italian: I fratelli Corsi) is a 1961 French-Italian historical action film directed by Anton Giulio Majano and starring Geoffrey Horne, Valérie Lagrange and Gérard Barray. It is also known as Lions of Corsica. The film is an adaptation of the 1844 story The Corsican Brothers by Alexandre Dumas. The film was shot in Eastmancolor.

== Synopsis ==
The Franchi twins, when baptized, were separated when their family was murdered by his enemies, the Sagona. While one brother went "into the maquis" for revenge, the other, unaware of the family drama, became a doctor and struck up a friendship with a descendant of the Sagona. But blood ties and their love for the same woman will bring them together...

== Cast ==
- Geoffrey Horne as Paolo Franchi / Leone Franchi
- Valérie Lagrange as Edith
- Gérard Barray as Giovanni Sagona
- Mario Feliciani as Dr. Dupont
- Emma Danieli as Gabrielle De Roux
- Jean Servais as Gerolamo Sagona
- Amedeo Nazzari as Orlandi
- Nerio Bernardi as Prof. Perrier
- Alberto Farnese as Gaspare
- Raoul Grassilli as Raul Sagona
- Franco Graziosi as Domenico
- Germano Longo as Claudio Franchi
- Sandro Moretti as Claudio
- Lucilla Morlacchi
- Paola Patrizi as Mariella
- Aldo Pini as Morny
- Laura Solari as Luisa Dupont
- Nando Tamberlani as Count Franchi
- Luigi Vannucchi as Luigi Sagona
- Lia Zoppelli as Aunt Mary

== Production ==
It was one of several European films Geoffrey Horne starred in following his success in Bridge on the River Kwai.
