= Renato Del Frate =

Italian cinematographer

- Born: 21 November 1910; Rome, Lazio, Italy
- Died: 28 August 1962 (aged 51); Rome, Lazio, Italy
- Occupation: Cinematographer
- Years active: 1937-1962

Renato Del Frate (1910–1962) was an Italian cinematographer who worked on more than fifty films during his career including Carmen (1954).

== Selected filmography ==
- Sentinels of Bronze (1937)
- Cardinal Messias (1939)
- The Hotel of the Absent (1939)
- The Marquis of Ruvolito (1939)
- The Carnival of Venice (1939)
- The Palace on the River (1940)
- The Taming of the Shrew (1942)
- The Woman of Sin (1942)
- Once a Week (1942)
- Fourth Page (1942)
- Lost in the Dark (1947)
- Baron Carlo Mazza (1948)
- The Crossroads (1951)
- The Piano Tuner Has Arrived (1952)
- Carmen (1954)
- It Happened at the Police Station (1954)
- The Lost City (1955)
- Rommel's Treasure (1955)

== Bibliography ==
- Ann Davies & Phil Powrie Carmen on Screen: An Annotated Filmography and Bibliography. Tamesis Books, 2006.
