= Michela Schiff Giorgini =

Italian archaeologist (1923–1978)

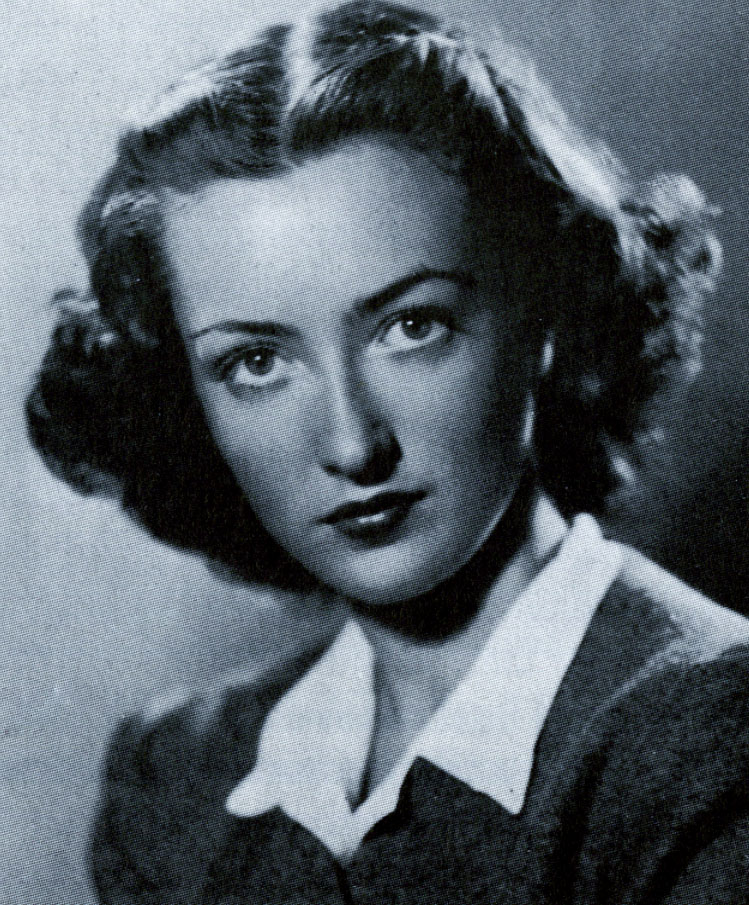
- Born: 30 October 1925; Padua, Kingdom of Italy
- Died: 3 July 1978 (aged 54); Benissa, Spain
- Other names: Michela Beomonte, Michela Belmonte
- Occupations: Actress and egyptologist
- Years active: 1942–1943 (actress); 1957–1978 (egyptologist)

Michela Schiff Giorgini Paleologo Diana née Beomonte (Padua, 30 Ocobter 1923–Benissa, 3 July 1978) was an Italian egyptologist and actor, who is remembered for her extensive work in today's Sudan at Soleb on the River Nile where from 1957 she conducted excavations of the Temple of Amenhotep III. During the 20 years she spent in the area, she went on to investigate the temple of Queen Tiye at Sedeinga, and the tomb of Taharqa at Nuri. The Michela Schiff Giorgini Foundation was established in 1984 to preserve her memory and promote Egyptology. Her research is well documented in her many books and publications, beginning with Soleb: Volume 1 in 1965.

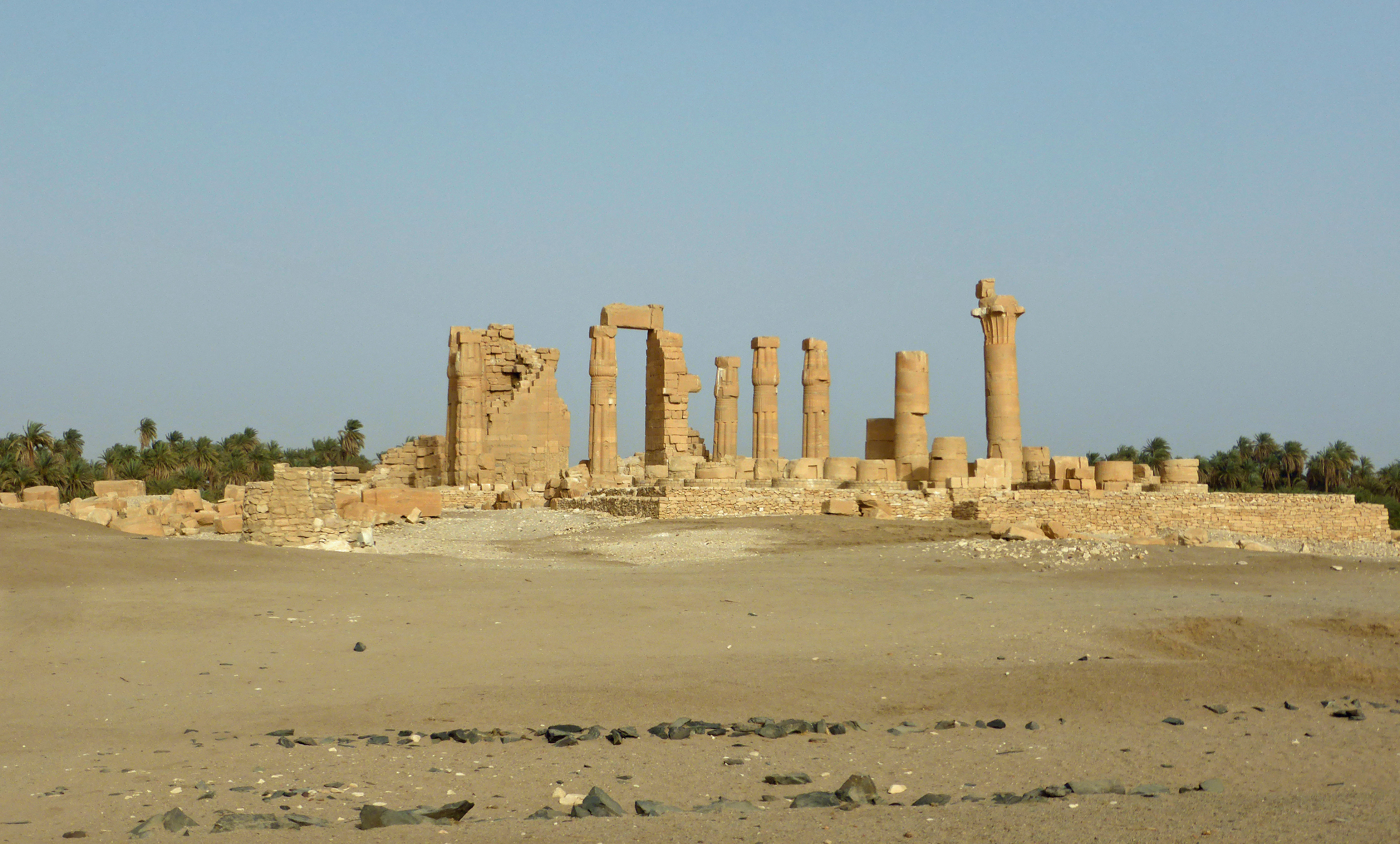
Temple of Amenhotep III, Soleb

== Biography ==
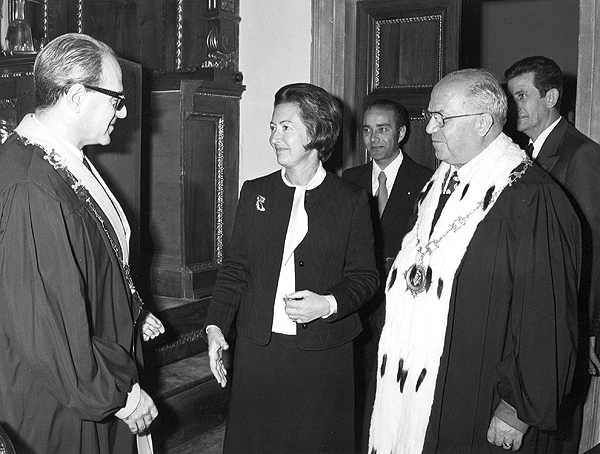
Michela Schiff Giorgini at her doctorate reception (Pisa, 1971)

Born on 30 October 1923 in Padua, Michela Beomonte was the daughter of the officer Belisarion Beomonte and his wife Gemma Lucchesi. She studied at a liceo artistico and, like her older sister, Maria, she attempted to pursue a career in cinema. She had starring roles in Roberto Rossellini's A Pilot Returns in 1942, and then in Mario Mattoli's The Three Pilots and Gherardo Gherardi's Il nostro prossimo.

In 1946 she married Giorgio Schiff Giorgini, a successful banker whose family had close connections with the University of Pisa where his father, Robert Schiff, was a professor.

The couple moved to Paris amd travelled extensively, visiting America, Africa and Asia. After several trips to Egypt, Schiff Giorgini decided her vocation was to conduct excavation work at ancient Egyptian sites. With her husband's enthusiastic support and under the patronage of the University of Pisa, she embarked on her first mission to Soleb, Sudan, accompanied by two experts: French egyptologist Clément Robichon (as architect and archaeologist) and Dutch egyptologist Jozef Janssen (as epigraphist). In 1961, Janssen was replaced by Jean Leclant, Egyptology professor at the Sorbonne. From 1957 to 1977, Schiff Giorgini and her team spent six months each year in the Sudan, from October to March.

After arriving in Soleb in 1957, under Schiff Giorgini's efficient and well organized management, the team undertook a detailed examination of the temple, before undertaking excavations of its various components. Work was also carried out on the necropolis which was discovered some 800 metres from the temple. Intricate work was completed on the ruins each year until in 1963 when attention was directed at Sedeinga, about 15 km to the north, with its Temple of Queen Tiye, the wife of Amenhotep III. In the neighbouring Meroitic tombs, glassware was found among the funeral artefacts. An ancient road, some 40 km long, was discovered, linking the temples of Soleb and Sesebi. In the vicinity, at Nuri the tomb of the Ethiopian Pharaoh Taharqa was discovered.

In 1977, Schiff Giorgini left Sudan for the last time. She moved to Spain where she died on 3 July 1978 in Benissa, Alicante, after suffering from meningitis.

== Awards and distinctions ==
In addition to her honorary doctorate (1971), Schiff Giorgini received many distinctions, including the Medal of Science and Culture from the Republic of Sudan, Commander of Order of Merit of the Italian Republic, Commander of the Ordre national du Mérite (France) and Knight of the Legion of Honour.

== Filmography ==
- A Pilot Returns (1942)
- The Three Pilots (1942)
- Il nostro prossimo (1943)

== Bibliography ==
- Bondanella, Peter. The Films of Roberto Rossellini. Cambridge University Press, 1993.
