= The Monastery of Santa Chiara =

1949 film

- Directed by: Mario Sequi
- Written by: Michele Galdieri; Vinicio Marinucci; Fulvio Palmieri; Mario Sequi
- Produced by: Ignazio Senese
- Starring: Edda Albertini; Massimo Serato; Nyta Dover
- Cinematography: Piero Portalupi
- Edited by: Guido Bertoli
- Music by: Roman Vlad
- Production company: Avis Film
- Release date: 20 May 1949
- Running time: 90 minutes
- Country: Italy
- Language: Italian

The Monastery of Santa Chiara (Italian: Monastero di Santa Chiara) is a 1949 Italian war melodrama film directed by Mario Sequi and starring Edda Albertini, Massimo Serato and Nyta Dover. The film's sets were designed by the art director Angelo Zagame.

== Synopsis ==
During the Second World War Ester a Jewish nightclub singer in Naples has to flee the city to escape persecution and deportation from the occupying German forces. She is helped by her SS officer lover who takes her to safety in a monastery. He then commits suicide. While she survives a bombing raid, she is persecuted by Greta the dead man's discarded German lover.

== Cast ==
- Edda Albertini as Ester di Veroli
- Massimo Serato as Rudolf, ufficiale delle SS
- Nyta Dover as Greta
- Lamberto Picasso as Il tedesco condannato
- Nino Manfredi as Enrico
- John Kitzmiller as Il negro
- Paolo Reale as Ciccillo
- Mario Corte as Il prete
- Fausto Guerzoni as Un pensionante
- Italia Marchesini as Donna Filomena, madre di Enrico
- Eduardo Passarelli as Il prestigitatore
- Bianca Doria as La sorella del prete
- Bruno von Barens as L'ufficiale tedesco
- Alberto Moravia as Himself

== Bibliography ==
- Baron, Lawrence. Projecting the Holocaust Into the Present: The Changing Focus of Contemporary Holocaust Cinema. Rowman & Littlefield, 2005.
- Bayman, Louis. The Operatic and the Everyday in Postwar Italian Film Melodrama. Edinburgh University Press, 2014.
- Klein, Shira. Italy's Jews from Emancipation to Fascism. Cambridge University Press, 2018.
