= The Sisters Materassi =

1934 novel by Aldo Palazzeschi

- Author: Aldo Palazzeschi
- Original title: Sorelle Materassi
- Language: Italian
- Publisher: Vallecchi
- Publication date: 1934
- Publication place: Italy
- Pages: 307

The Sisters Materassi (Italian: Sorelle Materassi) is a 1934 novel by the Italian writer Aldo Palazzeschi. It is set in Coverciano, a suburb of Florence, and is about how three locally respected sisters take care of an orphaned nephew who desires a more fashionable living.

The novel was the basis for the 1944 film The Materassi Sisters directed by Ferdinando Maria Poggioli and the 1972 TV serial Sorelle Materassi directed by Mario Ferrero.
