= Massimo Girotti =

Italian actor (1918-2003)

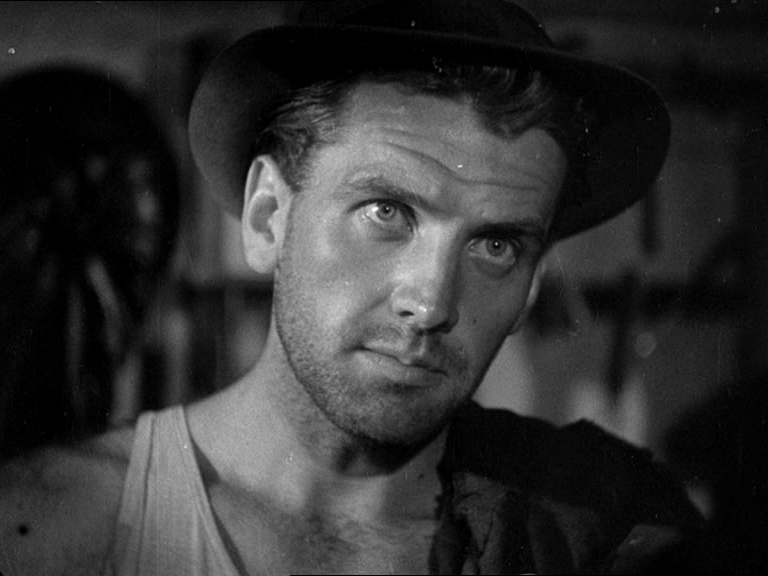
- Girotti in Ossessione (1943)
- Born: 18 May 1918; Mogliano, Macerata, Kingdom of Italy
- Died: 5 January 2003 (aged 84); Rome, Italy
- Height: 1.80 m (5 ft 11 in)
- Spouse: Marcella Girotti

Massimo Girotti (18 May 1918 – 5 January 2003) was an Italian film actor whose career spanned seven decades.

== Biography ==
Born in Mogliano, in the province of Macerata, Girotti developed his athletic physique by swimming and playing polo. While studying engineering, he attracted the attention of Mario Soldati, who offered him a small part in the film Dora Nelson (1939), but it was not until later, in Alessandro Blasetti's La corona di ferro (The Iron Crown) (1941) and Roberto Rossellini's Un Pilota ritorna (A Pilot Returns) (1942), that he began to make an impression as a serious actor. In 1943 came a turning point in his career when Luchino Visconti cast him opposite the torrid Clara Calamai in Ossessione (Obsession), an earlier adaptation of the same novel on which Hollywood's The Postman Always Rings Twice is based. The film marked, in a sense, the birth of Italian neo-realism. Some of his notable post-war films include Caccia tragica (The Tragic Hunt) (1946) by Giuseppe De Santis and In nome della legge (1949) (In the Name of the Law) by Pietro Germi.

In 1950, he starred opposite Lucia Bosé in Michelangelo Antonioni's first full-length feature, Cronaca di un amore (Story of a Love Affair) (1950). In 1953, he played Spartacus in an Italian epic film known in the US as Sins of Rome and then, returned to work again for Visconti, in Senso (1954), giving perhaps the finest performance of his career. In the years which followed, he appeared in many mainly Italian films for directors such as Lizzani, Bolognini, Vittorio Cottafavi, Lattuada, but it was not until 1968 that he once again played a role worthy of his talents - that of the father in Pasolini's Teorema (Theorem) with Terence Stamp and Silvana Mangano. Two years later, Pasolini cast him as Creonte opposite Maria Callas in his Medea (1969). In 1972, he was in Bernardo Bertolucci's Last Tango in Paris. That same year he made a rare appearance in a horror film when he agreed to a supporting role in Baron Blood as a favor to its director Mario Bava.

He continued to act in character roles for the next thirty years. Some of the films he appeared in have been notable, including Joseph Losey's Monsieur Klein (1976) with Alain Delon and Jeanne Moreau, Art of Love (1983) by Walerian Borowczyk, the 1985 television miniseries Quo Vadis?, Roberto Benigni's Il mostro (The Monster) (1994).

He died in Rome of a heart attack after having just completed his last film, Ferzan Özpetek's La Finestra di fronte (Facing Windows) (2003).

== Selected filmography ==
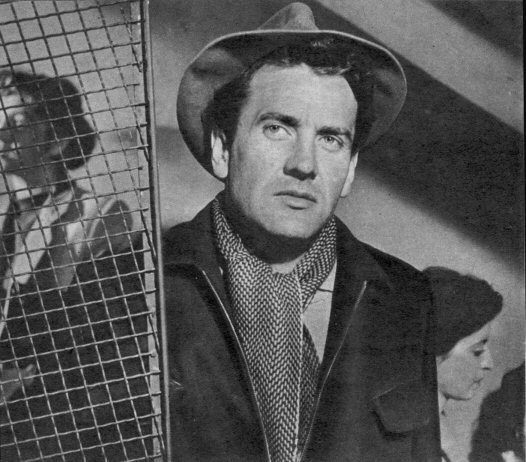
Girotti in Rome 11:00

- Dora Nelson (1939) - Enrico
- A Romantic Adventure (1940) - Luciano
- Tosca (1941) - Angeloti (uncredited)
- The Iron Crown (1941) - Licinio & Arminio, his son
- Pirates of Malaya (1941) - Tremal-Naik
- The Two Tigers (1941) - Tremal-Naik
- The Brambilla Family Go on Holiday (1941) - Marco Sassoli
- A Pilot Returns (1942) - Il tenente Gino Rossati
- Harlem (1943) - Tommaso Rossi
- Ossessione (Obsession) (1943) - Gino Costa
- Apparition (1943) - Franco
- The Gates of Heaven (1945) - Il giovane cieco
- The Ten Commandments (1945) (segment "Ricordati di santificare le feste")
- La carne e l'anima (1945) - Andrea
- Un giorno nella vita (1946) - Luigi Monotti
- Desire (1946) - Nando Mancini
- Fatalità (1947) - Vincenzo Masi
- Tragic Hunt (1947) - Michele
- Shamed (1947) - Rocco
- Christmas at Camp 119 (1947) .... Nane, il veneziano
- Lost Youth (1948) - Marcello Mariani
- Difficult Years (1948) - Giovanni
- The Street Has Many Dreams (1948) - Paolo Bertoni
- In the Name of the Law (1949) - Il pretore Guido Schiavi
- Fabiola (1949) - Sebastian
- Altura (1949) - Stanis Archena
- Welcome, Reverend! (1950)
- Story of a Love Affair (1950) - Guido
- Land der Sehnsucht (1950)
- Behind Closed Shutters (1951) - Ingegnere Roberto
- Fugitive in Trieste (1951) - Il falso giornalista
- Duello senza onore (1951) - Carlo
- Rome 11:00 (1952) - Nando
- Leathernose (1952) - Le docteur Marchal
- Il segreto delle tre punte (1952) - Massimo Del Colle
- Lieutenant Giorgio (1952) - Tenente G. Biserta
- Sins of Rome (Spartaco, 1953) - Spartacus
- At the Edge of the City (1953) - Avv. Roberto Martini
- Sul ponte dei sospiri (1953) - Marco Spada
- A Husband for Anna (1953) - Andrea Grazzi
- Torna! (1953) - Dott. Guido Aureli
- The Love of a Woman (1953) - André Lorenzi
- Senso (1954) - Il marchese Roberto Ussoni
- La tua donna (1954) - Sandro Ademari
- Marguerite de la nuit (1955) - Valentin
- I quattro del getto tonante (1955) - Maggiore Montanari
- Desperate Farewell (1955) - Dott. Andrea Pitti
- Dimentica il mio passato (1957) - Carlos
- Saranno uomini (1957) - Don Antonio
- Souvenir d'Italie (1957) - Ugo Parenti
- La Bestia humana (1957) - Pedro Sandoval
- The Goddess of Love (1957) - Prassitele
- La trovatella di Pompei (1957) - Guglielmo Curti
- The Road a Year Long (1958) - Chiacchiera (Naklapalo)
- Herod the Great (1959) - Ottaviano / Augustus
- Asphalte (1959) - Éric
- Head of a Tyrant (1959) - Holophernes
- Wolves of the Deep (1959) - Comandante
- La cento chilometri (1959) - Toccaceli
- Le notti dei Teddy Boys (1959) - Constantinos Vater
- The Cossacks (1960) - Tsar Alexander II
- Lettere di una novizia (1960) - Don Paolo Conti
- The Giants of Thessaly (1960) - Orfeo
- Cavalcata selvaggia (1960)
- Duel of the Titans (1961) - Re Tazio
- Imperial Venus (1962) - Leclerc
- Mafia alla sbarra (1963)
- Gold for the Caesars (1963) - Pro-Consul Caius Cornelius Maximus
- Marco the Magnificent (1965) - Nicolò, Marco's Father
- Idoli controluce (1965) - Ugo Sanfelice
- El misterioso señor Van Eyck (1966)
- La volpe e le camelie (1966)
- The Witches (1967) - Sportsman (segment "Strega Bruciata Viva, La")
- Theorem (1968) - Paolo, the father
- Listen, Let's Make Love (1968) - Tassi
- Le sorelle (1969) - Alex / Martha's husband
- The Red Tent (1969) - Romagna
- Medea (1969) .... King Kresus / Creonte
- Baron Blood (1972) - Dr. Karl Hummel
- Last Tango in Paris (1972) - Marcel
- Il mio corpo con rabbia (1972) - Gabriele
- Les voraces (1973) - Olmi
- Stateline Motel (1973) - Fred Norton
- La coppia (1973)
- The Kiss of Death (1974) - Eugenio Dazzi
- Cagliostro (1975) - Giacomo Casanova
- The Suspicious Death of a Minor (1975) - Gaudenzio Pesce
- Mark Shoots First (1975) - Il Questore Spaini
- The Innocent (1976) - Count Stefano Egano
- Monsieur Klein (1976) - Charles
- And Agnes Chose to Die (1976) - Palita
- Origins of the Mafia (1976, TV Mini-Series) - Viceroy Caracciolo
- Passion of Love (1981) - Colonel
- Art of Love (1983) - Ovid
- Quo Vadis? (1985, TV Mini-Series) - Aulus Plautius
- The Berlin Affair (1985) - Werner Von Heiden
- La Bohème (1988) - Con la partecipazione di
- Rebus (1989) - Conte Valery Du Terrail
- La Révolution française (1989) - L'envoyé du Pape (segment "Anées Lumière, Les")
- Dall'altra parte del mondo (1992) - Aureliano
- L'amore dopo (1993) - Ing. Staino
- The Monster (1994) - Distinguished Resident
- Un bel dì vedremo (1997) - Emilio Venditti
- Dionysios Solomos (2001)
- Facing Windows (2003) - Simone / Davide Veroli (final film role)

== See also ==
- Mario Girotti – Italian actor, director and producer (born 1939)
