= Fulvio Palmieri =

Italian screenwriter

- Born: 19 October 1903; Rome, Lazio, Kingdom of Italy
- Died: 10 August 1966 (aged 62); Lacco Ameno, Campania, Italy
- Occupation: Screenwriter
- Years active: 1933–1965 (film)

Fulvio Palmieri (19 October 1903 – 10 August 1966) was an Italian screenwriter. He wrote approximately fifty films, including the 1961 adventure film The Corsican Brothers.

== Selected filmography ==
- Bad Subject (1933)
- Cavalry (1936)
- Luciano Serra, Pilot (1938)
- Lost in the Dark (1947)
- Immigrants (1948)
- Baron Carlo Mazza (1948)
- The Man with the Grey Glove (1948)
- Be Seeing You, Father (1948)
- Buried Alive (1949)
- The Monastery of Santa Chiara (1949)
- Sicilian Uprising (1949)
- The Flame That Will Not Die (1949)
- Flying Squadron (1949)
- The Cliff of Sin (1950)
- The Fighting Men (1950)
- Cavalcade of Heroes (1950)
- Song of Spring (1951)
- What Price Innocence? (1952)
- Past Lovers (1953)
- The Corsican Brothers (1961)
- Highest Pressure (1965)

== Bibliography ==
- Mustazza, Leonard. The Literary Filmography: Preface, A-L. McFarland, 2006.
