= A Pilot Returns =

- Directed by: Roberto Rossellini
- Written by: Michelangelo Antonioni; Ugo Betti; Gherardo Gherardi; Rosario Leone; Margherita Maglione; Massimo Mida; Vittorio Mussolini; Roberto Rossellini
- Starring: Massimo Girotti; Michela Belmonte; Piero Lulli; Gaetano Masier
- Cinematography: Vincenzo Seratrice
- Edited by: Eraldo Da Roma
- Music by: Renzo Rossellini
- Production company: Alleanza Cinematografica Italiana
- Distributed by: Alleanza Cinematografica Italiana
- Release date: 8 April 1942
- Running time: 87 minutes
- Country: Italy
- Language: Italian

A Pilot Returns (Italian: Un pilota ritorna) is a 1942 Italian war film directed by Roberto Rossellini and starring Massimo Girotti, Michela Belmonte and Piero Lulli. The film forms part of Rossellini's "Fascist trilogy" along with The White Ship (1941) and The Man with a Cross (1943). It was made with the co-operation of the Italian Air Force. The film's sets were designed by the architect Virgilio Marchi.

== Synopsis ==
During the 1940-1941 Italian invasion of Greece, an Italian pilot is shot down and captured by British forces who place him in a prisoner-of-war camp run by the Greek Army. While there he meets and falls in love with a young Italian woman who has volunteered to care for the prisoners. After escaping from the Greeks, he manages to steal a plane and return to Italy for further duty. On his arrival he learns that Greece has been successfully conquered by the Axis Powers.

== Cast ==
- Massimo Girotti as Gino Rossati
- Michela Belmonte as Anna
- Piero Lulli as De Santis
- Gaetano Masier as Trisotti
- Elvira Betrone as Signora Rossati
- Piero Palermini as English Official
- Giovanni Valdambrini as medico
- Nino Brondello as Vitali
- Jole Tinta as madre

== Bibliography ==
- Bondanella, Peter. The Films of Roberto Rossellini. Cambridge University Press, 1993.
- Haaland, Torunn. Italian Neorealist Cinema. Edinburgh University Press, 2012.
