= Enrico Ribulsi =

Italian actor and screenwriter

- Occupations: Actor, Writer
- Years active: 1937–1975 (film)

Enrico Ribulsi was an Italian actor and screenwriter.

== Selected filmography ==
- The Ferocious Saladin (1937)
- The Last Enemy (1938)
- The White Angel (1943)
- Measure for Measure (1943)
- The Gates of Heaven (1945)
- Ten Commandments (1945)
- The Testimony (1946)
- Invasion 1700 (1962)
- Arturo's Island (1962)
- The Reunion (1963)
- The Most Beautiful Wife (1970)
- The Assassin of Rome (1972)
- How to Kill a Judge (1975)

== Bibliography ==
- Wagstaff, Christopher. Italian Neorealist Cinema: An Aesthetic Approach. University of Toronto Press, 2007.
