= Fugitive in Trieste =

1951 film

- Film poster
- Directed by: Guido Salvini
- Written by: Camillo Del Signore; Diego Fabbri; Turi Vasile
- Starring: Doris Duranti; Jacques Sernas; Edda Albertini; Massimo Girotti
- Cinematography: Vincenzo Seratrice
- Edited by: Mario Serandrei
- Music by: Fiorenzo Carpi
- Production company: Astor Pictures Corporation
- Distributed by: Variety Distribution
- Release dates: 1951 (Italy); 28 January 1954 (United States)
- Running time: 90 minutes
- Country: Italy
- Language: Italian

Fugitive in Trieste (Italian: Clandestino a Trieste) is a 1951 Italian war-drama film directed by Guido Salvini and starring Doris Duranti, Jacques Sernas and Massimo Girotti.

== Plot ==
Giulio (Jacques Sernas), an Italian Air Force officer is arrested by Allied forces who believe he has deliberately bombed a hospital ship during World War II. Through the efforts of Lida (Doris Duranti), his sweetheart, a witness is found who proves the bombing was not intentional but the result of being hit by enemy fire.

== Cast ==
- Doris Duranti as Lida
- Jacques Sernas as Giulio
- Massimo Girotti as Fred Nolan, Il falso giornalista
- Edda Albertini as Marcella
- Giovanni Grasso as Ispettore di Polizia
- Cesare Polacco as Autista di taxi
- Carlo D'Angelo
- Charles Fawcett
- Vittorio Sanipoli
- Alberto Bonucci
- Giancarlo Sbragia
- Gianni Bonagura

== Production ==
Fugitive in Trieste was one of a number of films of the era, including the British production Sleeping Car to Trieste (1946) and American Diplomatic Courier (1952) that used Trieste as a backdrop. These films often highlighted its cosmopolitan nature and as a borderline between different powers due to the Trieste question.
