= Desire (1946 Italian film) =

1946 Italian film

- DVD cover
- Directed by: Marcello Pagliero; Roberto Rossellini
- Written by: Rosario Leone; Giuseppe De Santis; Roberto Rossellini; Diego Calcagno; Marcello Pagliero; Guglielmo Santangelo; Anna Benevuti
- Starring: Massimo Girotti; Elli Parvo; Carlo Ninchi
- Cinematography: Rodolfo Lombardi; Ugo Lombardi
- Edited by: Marcello Pagliero
- Music by: Renzo Rossellini
- Production companies: Imperator Film; SAFIR; Sovrania Film
- Distributed by: Fincine
- Release date: 5 May 1946
- Running time: 91 minutes
- Country: Italy
- Language: Italian

Desire (Italian: Desiderio) is a 1946 Italian melodrama film directed by Marcello Pagliero and Roberto Rossellini and starring Massimo Girotti, Elli Parvo and Carlo Ninchi.

== Plot ==
Paola, daughter of a railwayman, leaves her home in Abruzzo to go to Rome, where she finds work with a dressmaker. It does not last, and she drifts into high-end prostitution. Shocked one morning by seeing the corpse of a girl who had thrown herself from a building, she is comforted by Giovanni, a kindly older man whose business is breeding flowers. Contrasting the mess of her own life with the simple purity of his, she resolves to return to the family home and see her sister Anna, whose wedding she failed to attend. Giovanni will follow later and ask her father for her hand.

While Anna is glad to see her and her mother accepts her back, her father refuses to acknowledge her existence and Nando, her sister's husband, regards her as fair game. She is also pestered by Riccardo, now married, who had seduced her. Worried over her husband's infatuation with Paola, Anna persuades him to take her away for a few days. Riccardo then learns from the girl in the village post office that Giovanni is coming to claim Paola, so he threatens to reveal her past if she does not succumb again. Learning this from Anna, Nando rushes back to the village and, after knocking Riccardo out, claims from Paola his reward for saving her. Once he has finished, Paola throws herself from a railway bridge. Walking from the station to the family home, Giovanni is shocked to see policemen guarding a corpse under a blanket.

== Production ==
The film originally went into production in 1943 with Rossellini as director under the title Scalo merci (Freight Yard). Rossellini planned to shoot at the railway yards in San Lorenzo in Rome, but these were hit by a heavy Allied bombing raid the night before filming was due to start. He switched shooting to the comparative safety of the Abruzzo hills, but after the Fall of the Fascist regime financing dried up and Rossellini halted the shoot in September 1943. After the Liberation of Rome, Marcello Pagliero relaunched the production and took over direction of the film. Interiors were shot at the Farnesina Studios in Rome while location shooting took place around Tagliacozzo in L'Aquila. The film's sets were designed by the art director Virgilio Marchi. Now retitled Rinuncia (Renunciation) it had had censorship issues and with several scenes cut it was finally released as Desire.

== Cast ==
- Massimo Girotti as Nando, Anna's husband
- Elli Parvo as Paola, Anna's sister
- Carlo Ninchi as Giovanni, plant breeder
- Roswita Schmidt as Anna, Paola's sister
- Francesco Grandjacquet as Riccardo, former Paola's lover
- Giovanna Scotto as Elvira, Paola and Anna's mother
- Lia Corelli as Elena
- Jucci Kellerman as Lia

== Bibliography ==
- Brunette, Peter. Roberto Rossellini. University of California Press, 1996.
- Chiti, Roberto & Poppi, Roberto . I film: Tutti i film italiani dal 1930 al 1944. Gremese Editore, 2005.
- Gallagher, Tag. The Adventures Of Roberto Rossellini: His Life And Films. Hachette Books, 1998.
- Gundle, Stephen. Fame Amid the Ruins: Italian Film Stardom in the Age of Neorealism. Berghahn Books, 2019.
