= The Three Pilots =

1942 film

- Film poster
- Directed by: Mario Mattoli
- Written by: Alessandro De Stefani; Mario Mattoli; Vittorio Mussolini
- Starring: Michela Belmonte; Leonardo Cortese; Alberto Sordi
- Cinematography: Anchise Brizzi
- Edited by: Fernando Tropea; Giuliana Giammarino
- Music by: Ezio Carabella; Renzo Rossellini
- Production company: Alleanza Cinematografica Italiana
- Distributed by: Alleanza Cinematografica Italiana
- Release date: 30 August 1942
- Running time: 80 minutes
- Country: Italy
- Language: Italian

The Three Pilots (Italian: I tre aquilotti) is a 1942 Italian war drama film directed by Mario Mattoli and starring Michela Belmonte, Leonardo Cortese and Alberto Sordi. It was shot at the Cinecittà Studios in Rome and at the Accademia Aeronautica in Caserta. The film's sets were designed by the art director.

== Cast ==
- Michela Belmonte as Adriana Terrazzani
- Leonardo Cortese as Marco Massi
- Carlo Minello as Mario Terrazzani
- Alberto Sordi as Filippo Nardini
- Galeazzo Benti as Andrea Torelli
- Enrico Effernelli as Fioresi
- Pietro Bigerna as Cesarini
- Paolo Carlini as Un allievo aviere
- Piero Carnabuci as Il generale commandante
- Leo Catozzo as Il maggiore addetto ai servizi
- Vianora di San Giusto as La signora Terrazzani
- Cesare Erminio as Un allievo ufficiale
- Riccardo Fellini as Un allievo aviere
- Mario Liberati as Il maresciallo istruttore

== Bibliography ==
- Brunetta, Gian Piero (2009). The History of Italian Cinema: A Guide to Italian Film from Its Origins to the Twenty-first Century. Princeton University Press. ISBN 978-0-691-11988-5 – via Internet Archive.
