= The Gates of Heaven =

1945 film

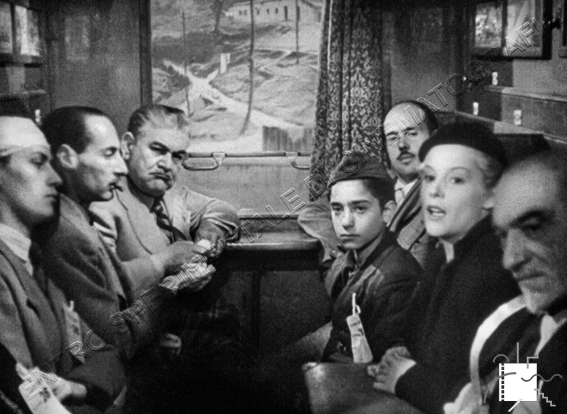
- Screenshot from The Gates of Heaven
- Directed by: Vittorio De Sica
- Written by: Vittorio De Sica; Piero Bargellini; Diego Fabbri; Adolfo Franci; Carlo Musso; Enrico Ribulsi; Cesare Zavattini
- Produced by: Corrado Conti di Senigallia; Salvo D'Angelo
- Starring: Marina Berti
- Cinematography: Aldo Tonti
- Edited by: Mario Bonotti
- Music by: Enzo Masetti
- Production companies: Orbis Film; Centro Cattolico Cinematografico
- Distributed by: Lux Film
- Release date: 15 February 1945
- Running time: 88 minutes
- Country: Italy
- Language: Italian

The Gates of Heaven (Italian: La porta del cielo) is a 1945 Italian drama film directed by Vittorio De Sica.

The film was made during the German occupation of Rome, with support from the Vatican. This and another film, The Ten Commandments, allowed a number of actors, under pressure to go north and work in Venice for the film industry of Mussolini's puppet Italian Social Republic, to remain in Rome.

The film's sets were designed by Salvo D'Angelo who also worked as co-producer. Vittorio de Sica hired approximately 300 extras, who were Jewish or simply being persecuted by the Nazi regime, because of their physical oddity. To avoid their deportation and later execution, he prolonged the shooting of the film as long as he could, awaiting the arrival of the allied armies.

The film won the OCIC Special Award at the 53rd Venice International Film Festival in 1996 for efforts to restore the film.

== Plot ==
This is the story of a train full of sick and deformed pilgrims on their way to seek miracles at the shrine of Our Lady of Loreto, near the city of Ancona in eastern Italy.

== Cast ==
- Marina Berti as La crocerossina
- Elettra Druscovich as Filomena, la governante
- Massimo Girotti as Il giovane cieco
- Roldano Lupi as Giovanni Brandacci, il pianista
- Carlo Ninchi as L'accompagnatore del cieco
- Elli Parvo as La signora provocante
- María Mercader as Maria (as Maria Mercader)
- Cristiano Cristiani as Claudio Gorini, il bambino paralizzato
- Giovanni Grasso as Il commerciante paralitico
- Giuseppe Forcina as L'ingegniere
- Enrico Ribulsi as Uno dei nepoti del commerciante
- Amelia Bissi as La signora Enrichetta
- Annibale Betrone as Il medico del treno bianco
- Tilde Teldi as La contessa crocerossina
- Pina Piovani as La zia del piccolo Claudio
- Giulio Alfieri as Un signore anziano
- Giulio Calì as Il napoletano curioso
- Teresa Mariani
- Vittorio Cottafavi
- Gildo Bocci

== Bibliography ==
- Gundle, Stephen. Mussolini's Dream Factory: Film Stardom in Fascist Italy. Berghahn Books, 2013.
