= Virgilio Marchi =

Italian scenographer and architect

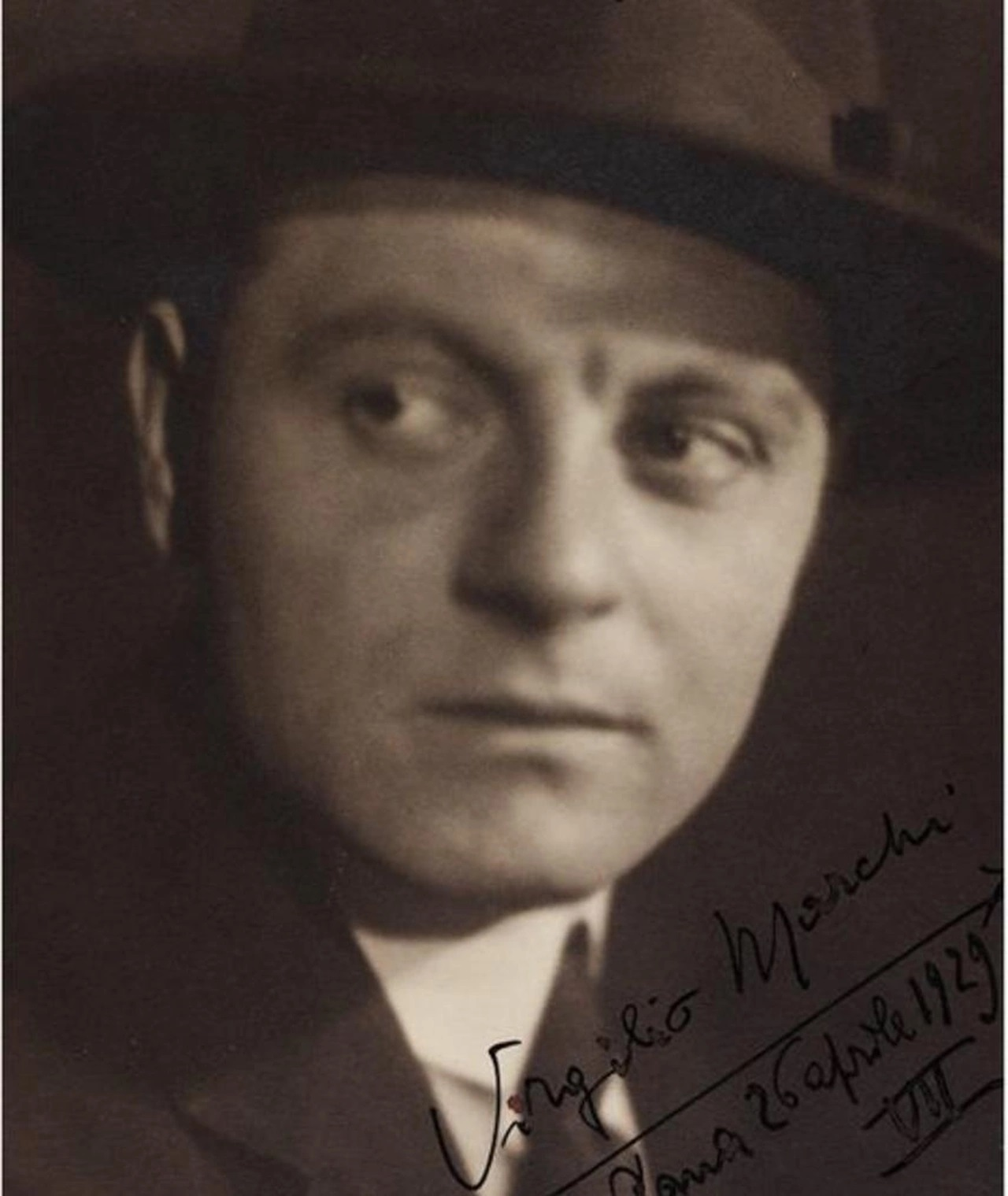
- Born: 21 January 1895; Livorno, Tuscany, Italy
- Died: 30 April 1960 (aged 65); Rome, Lazio, Italy
- Occupations: Architect; Art Director
- Years active: 1936-1960 (film)

Virgilio Marchi (21 January 1895 – 30 April 1960) was an Italian architect and art director. He designed the sets for more than fifty films during his career. Marchi was stylistically identified with the Futurist movement.

== Selected filmography ==
- Territorial Militia (1935)
- The Two Sergeants (1936)
- Condottieri (1937)
- Queen of the Scala (1937)
- An Adventure of Salvator Rosa (1939)
- The Marquis of Ruvolito (1939)
- The Count of Brechard (1940)
- A Pilot Returns (1942)
- Luisa Sanfelice (1942)
- Four Steps in the Clouds (1942)
- Annabella's Adventure (1943)
- Maria Malibran (1943)
- Desire (1946)
- Lost in the Dark (1947)
- Baron Carlo Mazza (1948)
- Heaven Over the Marshes (1949)
- The Flowers of St. Francis (1950)
- Margaret of Cortona (1950)
- Europe '51 (1952)
- They Were Three Hundred (1952)
- Prisoners of Darkness (1952)
- Umberto D. (1952)
- Article 519, Penal Code (1952)
- Mademoiselle Gobete (1952)
- The Return of Don Camillo (1953)
- Mata Hari's Daughter (1954)
- The Two Orphans (1954)
- Don Camillo's Last Round (1955)
- The Bigamist (1956)
