= The Marquis of Ruvolito =

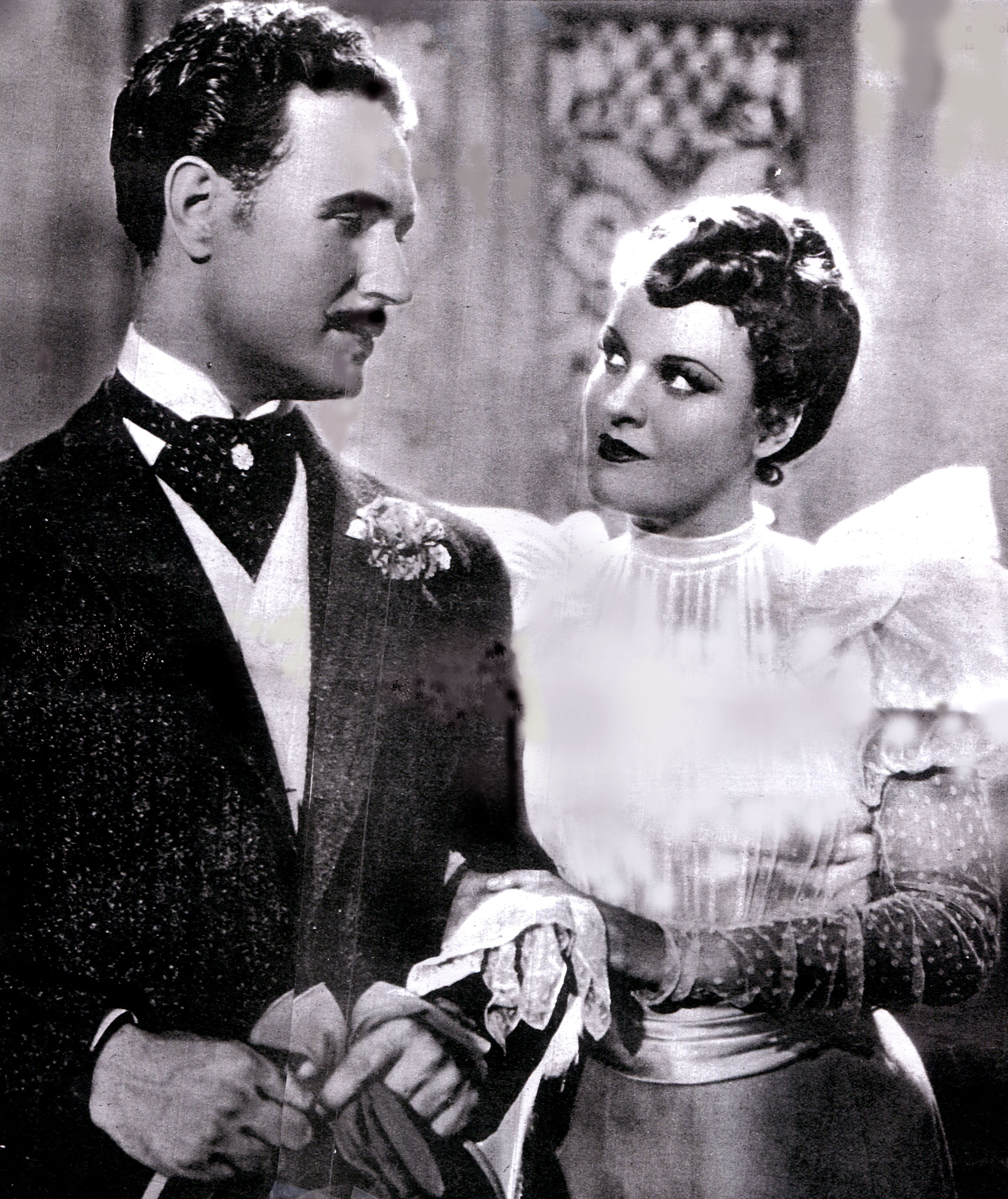
- Scene featuring Elli Parvo
- Directed by: Raffaello Matarazzo
- Written by: Nino Martoglio (play); Ernesto Grassi; Eduardo De Filippo; Raffaello Matarazzo
- Produced by: Amedeo Madia
- Starring: Eduardo De Filippo; Peppino De Filippo; Leda Gloria; Elli Parvo
- Cinematography: Renato Del Frate
- Edited by: Marcello Caccialupi
- Music by: Nicola Valente
- Production company: Irpinia Cinematografica
- Distributed by: Generalcine
- Release date: 20 February 1939
- Running time: 93 minutes
- Country: Italy
- Language: Italian

The Marquis of Ruvolito (Italian: Il marchese di Ruvolito) is a 1939 Italian "white-telephones" comedy film directed by Raffaello Matarazzo and starring Eduardo De Filippo, Peppino De Filippo and Leda Gloria. Based on a play of the same title by Nino Martoglio, it is set in Naples during the early 1900s. It is now considered a lost film.

The film's sets were designed by the art director Virgilio Marchi and Italo Tomassi. It was shot at Cinecittà Studios in Rome.

== Cast ==
- Eduardo De Filippo as Il marchese di Ruvolito
- Peppino De Filippo as Il marchese Erasmo di Mezzomondello
- Rosina Anselmi as Donna Placida Cimosata
- Elli Parvo as Immacolata - la figlia di Donna Placida
- Leda Gloria as Lily Gordon
- Virgilio Riento as Don Timurata
- Turi Pandolfini as Neddu Grisi
- Dina Perbellini as La contessa Scoperlati
- Angelo Pelliccioni as Adolfo
- Carla Sveva as Teresina
- Armando Migliari as Il barone di Mezzomondello
- Mercedes Brignone as La baronessa di Mezzomondello
- Adele Mosso as Marianna
- Eduardo Passarelli as Tanu Conti
- Norma Nova as La cameriera
- Tina Pica as Signorina Mangialardo

== Bibliography ==
- Goble, Alan. The Complete Index to Literary Sources in Film. Walter de Gruyter, 1999.
