= Elli Parvo =

Italian actress (1915–2010)

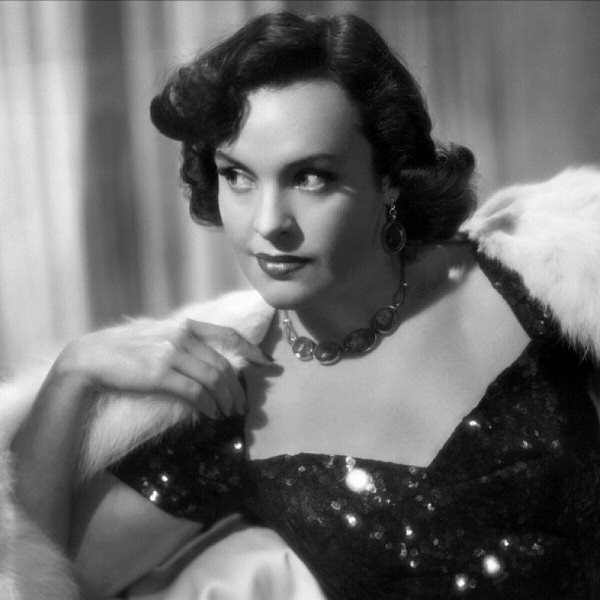
- Born: Elvira Gobbo; 17 October 1915; Milan, Kingdom of Italy
- Died: 19 February 2010 (aged 94); Rome, Italy
- Occupation: Actress
- Years active: 1934–1960

Elli Parvo (born Elvira Gobbo; 17 October 1915 – 19 February 2010) was an Italian film actress. She appeared in more than 50 films between 1934 and 1960.

== Selected filmography ==
- Loyalty of Love (1934) as La nobildonna al ballo
- The Ferocious Saladin (1937) as l'attrice truccata all'orientale
- Abandon All Hope (1937) as Gemma
- I Want to Live with Letizia (1938) as Unknown role
- Departure (1938) as La contadina con il neonato
- The Marquis of Ruvolito (1939) as Immacolata
- The Night of Tricks (1939) as Maria
- The Happy Ghost (1941) as Erika
- The King's Jester (1941) as La zingara
- Beatrice Cenci (1941) as Angela
- Carmen (1942) as Pamela
- Seven Years of Good Luck (1942) as Melitta
- Seven Years of Happiness (1943) as Melitta, la cameriera
- Il fanciullo del West (1943) as Lolita de Fuego
- The Gates of Heaven (1945) as La signora provocante
- Desire (1946) as Paola Previtali
- A Yank in Rome (1946) as Elena
- The Sun Still Rises (1946) as Matilde
- The Brothers Karamazov (1947) as Gruscenka
- Vertigine d'amore (1948) as Silvana
- The Mysterious Rider (1948) as Dogaressa
- The Howl (1948) as Silvia
- Toto the Third Man (1951) as Teresa, moglie di Paolo
- His Last Twelve Hours (1951) as la contessa Lidia Guidi
- Voto di marinaio (1952) as Mimì
- Rosalba, la fanciulla di Pompei (1952) as Laura
- The Art of Getting Along (1954) as Emma
- Loves of Three Queens (1954) as Junon
- L'ultimo amante (1955) as Clelia
- Allow Me, Daddy! (1956) as Fasòli
- The Goddess of Love (1957) as Elena
- World of Miracles (1959) as Magda Damiani
