= Baron Carlo Mazza =

- Directed by: Guido Brignone
- Written by: Michele Galdieri; Fulvio Palmieri
- Produced by: Fortunato Misiano
- Starring: Nino Taranto; Silvana Pampanini; Enzo Turco; Franco Coop
- Cinematography: Renato Del Frate
- Edited by: Gino Talamo
- Music by: Ezio Carabella
- Production company: Romana Film
- Distributed by: Romana Film
- Release date: 1948
- Running time: 85 minutes
- Country: Italy
- Language: Italian

Baron Carlo Mazza (Italian: Il barone Carlo Mazza) is a 1948 Italian musical comedy film directed by Guido Brignone and starring Nino Taranto, Silvana Pampanini and Enzo Turco. The film's art direction was by Virgilio Marchi.

== Synopsis ==
A penniless baron desperately tries to reverse his fortune, and eventually attempts to marry a wealthy Mexican woman.

== Cast ==
- Nino Taranto as Barone Carlo Mazza
- Silvana Pampanini as Rosa Pezza
- Enzo Turco as Cecè Rizzo
- Franco Coop as Cosimo
- Carlo Lombardi as Borgotti
- Mario Riva as Annunciatore
- Raimondo Van Riel as Zio Casimiro Pezza
- Gianna Dauro as Edwige Mazza
- Anna Corinto as La segretaria
- Franca Del Frate as Elvira Pezza
- Dianora Veiga as Lalla
- Paolo Carlini as Fugi
- Bruno Corelli as Il conte degli Strozzi
- Olga Vittoria Gentilli as La principessa Strozzi
- Nino Marchesini as Il nuovo rico
- Augusto Di Giovanni as Il commendatore
- Margherita Bossi as Sua moglie
- Agostino Salvietti as Portiere d'albergo
- Franco Pesce as Il maestro di musica
- Diana Dei as Una invitata alla festa
- Marino Maresca as Segretario del commendatore
- Amalia Pellegrini as Vecchietta al funerale
- Evelina Paoli as Amica della principessa
- Marco Tulli as Padrone del contino #2
- Claudio Ermelli as Padrone del contino

== Bibliography ==
- D'Amico, Masolino. La commedia all'italiana. Il Saggiatore, 2008.
