= The Testimony (1946 film) =

1946 film

- Directed by: Pietro Germi
- Written by: Diego Fabbri; Cesare Zavattini; Enrico Ribulsi; Ottavio Alessi; Pietro Germi
- Starring: Roldano Lupi; Marina Berti; Ernesto Almirante; Sandro Ruffini
- Cinematography: Aldo Tonti
- Edited by: Gisa Radicchi Levi
- Music by: Enzo Masetti
- Production company: Orbis Film
- Distributed by: CEIAD
- Release date: 15 February 1946
- Running time: 98 minutes
- Country: Italy
- Language: Italian

The Testimony (Italian: Il testimone) is 1946 Italian crime film directed by Pietro Germi and starring Roldano Lupi, Marina Berti and Ernesto Almirante. It is one of several films regarded as an antecedent of the later giallo thrillers. The film was made at the Farnesina Studios of Titanus in Rome. The sets were designed by the art director Salvo D'Angelo.

== Cast ==
- Roldano Lupi as Pietro Scotti
- Marina Berti as Linda
- Ernesto Almirante as Giuseppe Marchi, il testimone
- Sandro Ruffini as L'avvocato difensore
- Cesare Fantoni as Il padrone dell' osteria
- Arnoldo Foà as L'impiegato dell' anagrafe
- Dino Maronetto as Andrea, il condanato
- Marcella Melnati as La padrone di casa
- Alfredo Salvatori
- Petr Sharov as Il pubblico ministero
- Pietro Fumelli
- Angelo Calabrese
- Vittorio Cottafavi
- Giovanni Petrucci

== Bibliography ==
- Moliterno, Gino. A to Z of Italian Cinema. Scarecrow Press, 2009.
