= Shin Youngok =

South Korean lyric coloratura soprano (born 1961)

- Hangul: 신영옥
- Hanja: 申英玉
- RR: Sin Yeongok
- MR: Sin Yŏngok

Youngok Shin (also spelled Young-Ok Shin and Young Ok Shin: born July 3, 1961, in Seoul, South Korea) is a South Korean lyric coloratura soprano known for her interpretations of the bel canto repertoire.

== Personal life ==
Shin was born in Seoul, South Korea, the youngest of three daughters.

She studied at the Juilliard School in New York where she received both her bachelor's and master's degrees in music.

== Career ==
Shin made her opera debut as Susanna in Le nozze di Figaro in the 1989 Spoleto Festival USA. Shin has appeared regularly at the Metropolitan Opera since 1991 in a variety of roles including Gilda in Rigoletto (including two international radio broadcasts), title role in Lucia di Lammermoor, Zerlina in Don Giovanni, Elvira in I Puritani, Oscar in Un Ballo in Maschera with and Adina in L’Elisir D’Amore, the title role of Stravinsky's Le Rossignol, the Nightingale in L’Enfant et les Sortileges among others. She has also sung in the Metropolitan Opera's New Year's Eve Millennium Gala, the 2001 Gala honoring Giuseppe Verdi and the World Trade Center Relief Benefit. In 2005 and 2006, she sang Un Ballo in Maschera at the Metropolitan Opera in addition to Lucia di Lammermoor and Rigoletto. She sang the title role of Braunfels’ Die Vogel at the Spoleto Festival USA. Upcoming roles at the Metropolitan Opera in the 2006–07 season included Amor in Gluck's Orfeo. She will sing Lakme with Minnesota Opera and in 2008, Juliette in Roméo et Juliette for Baltimore. At the Metropolitan Opera she has sung with some of the world's leading conductors and singers including James Levine, James Conlon, Nello Santi, Edoardo Muller, Plácido Domingo, Luciano Pavarotti, Juan Pons, Carlo Guelfi, Leo Nucci, Marilyn Horne, Samuel Ramey, among others.

In addition to her Metropolitan Opera commitments in the past several seasons she has also sung Giulietta in Bellini's Capuletti ed I Montecchi at the festival in Tenerife, Spain, sang at the Baltimore Opera as Lucia and as Gilda, and debuted as Oscar in Un Ballo in Maschera for Washington Opera. For 2002–03 she returned to Baltimore for the new productions of Lakme and Rigoletto before going to the Paris Opera for the world premiere of Pascal Dusapin's Perela, l'Homme de Fumée and the Minnesota Orchestra for the Mahler 8th, both conducted by James Conlon.

Other recent engagements include La Sonnambula in a new production at Paris’ Opera Comique, Lucia di Lammermoor in Detroit with Michigan Opera Theatre, and her first performances of Liu in Turandot at the Bratislava Spring Festival. She also returned to Los Angeles for a gala performance at the Los Angeles Music Center.

Miss Shin has also appeared at the Bastille Opera in Paris as Oscar in Un Ballo in Maschera and as Gilda in Rigoletto, the Royal Opera Covent Garden as Gilda, Cologne Opera as Despina in Così fan tutte, Canadian Opera Company as Gilda and Lucia, L'Opera de Nice as Aminta in Il Re Pastore and as Elvira in I Puritani, Teatro Municipal in Santiago, Chile and the Liceo in Barcelona as Leila in Les Pêcheurs de Perles, Teatro Massimo Bellini in Catania in the title role of Bianca e Fernando, New York City Opera as the Princess in L’Enfant et les Sortileges, the Spoleto Festivals in Charleston and in Italy as Susanna in Le Nozze di Figaro, New Jersey State Opera and Florentine Opera as Lucia and the Monterrey Mexico Music Festival as Adina.

Additionally she has performed at the Teatro Regio in Turin as Elvira, the Opera Comique as Adina, and performed a series of concerts with the Orchestra Sinfonica Siciliana in Palermo, Messina and Catania. For the First Opera Festival of China, Miss Shin sang Gilda in Beijing and performed the same role at the old French Opera House in Hanoi, Vietnam in the first hearing of an opera in more than 35 years in that country. Miss Shin debuted in São Paulo, Brazil in May 99 with Un Ballo in Maschera, sang a concert performance of Puritani with the Aarhus Festival Symphony in Denmark, and sang Lucia in Caracas, Venezuela and in Mexico City with tenor Ramon Vargas.

== Repertoire ==
=== Opera roles ===
- Adina, L'elisir d'amore (Donizetti)
- Lucia, Lucia di Lammermoor (Donizetti)
- Azema, Semiramide (Rossini)
- Bianca, Bianca e Fernando (Bellini)
- Elvira, I Puritani, (Bellini)
- Giulietta, I Capuleti e i Montecchi (Bellini)
- Amina, La Sonnambula (Bellini)
- Gilda, Rigoletto (Verdi)
- Oscar, Un ballo in maschera (Verdi)
- Lakmé, Lakmé (Delibes)
- Nachtigall (Nightingale), Die Vögel (Braunfels) (USA Premiere 2005)
- Nightingale/Princess, L'enfant et les sortilèges (Ravel)
- Queen, Perelà, l'homme de fumée (Dusapin) (World Premiere 2003)
- Susanna, Le nozze di Figaro (Mozart)
- Zerlina, Don Giovanni (Mozart)
- Despina, Così fan tutte (Mozart)
- Aminta, Il re pastore (Mozart)
- Leila, Les pêcheurs de perles (Bizet)
- Liù, Turandot (Puccini)
- Juliette, Roméo et Juliette (Gounod)
- Amore, Orfeo ed Euridice (Gluck)
- Philistine Woman, Samson (Handel)

=== Concert work ===
- Carmina Burana (Carl Orff)
- Symphony No. 8 (Mahler)
- Concert Arias (Mozart)
- Lord Nelson Mass (Haydn)

== Recordings ==
- 1991 -《Bianca e Fernando》(Nuova Era)
- 1995 -《Vocalise》(Samsung Classics)
- 1996 -《Ave Maria》(Samsung Classics)
- 1997 -《A Dream》(Samsung Classics)
- 1998 -《My Romance》(Samsung Classics)
- 2000 -《Sacred Songs》(Yedang Classics)
- 2001 -《White Christmas》(Yedang Classics)
- 2003 -《My Songs》(Universal Music)
- 2004 -《Chansons d'Amour Live in Seoul, 2003》(Universal Music)
- 2004 -《The Ultimate Secret Garden》(Universal Music)
- 2006 -《Love Duets》(Universal Music)
- 2008 -《Cinématique》(Universal Music)
- 2009 -《Songs from My Heart》(Universal Music)
- 2009 -《The Iron Empress [OST]》(Pony Canyon)
- 2010 -《Love & Peace》(Universal Music)
- 2010 -《James Levine: Celebrating 40 Years at the Met: L'enfant et les sortilèges》(Decca)
- 2012 -《Suffering and Victory》(Universal Music)
- 2012 -《My Story: The Very Best of Youngok Shin》(Universal Music)
- 2016 -《Song: Arise | Album: United Korea 4 The World》

== Broadcast/Telecast ==
- 1990 -《Semiramide》(Metropolitan Opera)
- 1991 -《Rigoletto》(Metropolitan Opera)
- 1992 -《Rigoletto》(Canadian Opera Company)
- 1994 -《Rigoletto》(Royal Opera House Covent Garden)
- 1995 -《Lucia di Lammermoor》(Canadian Opera Company)
- 1997 -《Un Ballo in Maschera》(Metropolitan Opera)
- 2001 -《Un Ballo in Maschera & Rigoletto》(Metropolitan Opera)
- 2001 -《Un Ballo in Maschera》(Metropolitan Opera)
- 2002 -《L'enfant et les sortilèges》(Metropolitan Opera)

== DVDs ==
- 1990 -《Semiramide》(Image Entertainment)
- 2003 -《Big Concert 2003 with José Carreras & Youngok Shin》(Spectrum)

== Books ==
Youngok Shin <Après Un Rêve> 2009/04/13

== Awards and honors ==
- 1983 – Winner of Aspen Vocal Competition, US
- 1989 – Winner of Olga Koussevitzky Young Artists Award, US
- 1990 – Winner of Metropolitan Opera National Council Audition, US
- 1990 – Winner of Loren Zachary Vocal Competition, US
- 1990 – Winner of MEF Competition, US
- 1992 – Hong Nanpa Memorial Award, South Korea
- 1995 – Decorated with the Order of Culture Merit, South Korea
- 2000 – Woon Kyung Foundation Award, South Korea
