= The Reunion (1963 film) =

1963 film

- Film poster
- Directed by: Damiano Damiani
- Written by: Damiano Damiani; Ugo Liberatore; Vittoriano Petrilli; Enrico Ribulsi
- Starring: Walter Chiari
- Cinematography: Alessandro D'Eva
- Edited by: Giuseppe Vari
- Release date: June 1963
- Running time: 110 minutes
- Country: Italy
- Language: Italian

The Reunion (Italian: La rimpatriata) is a 1963 Italian film directed by Damiano Damiani. It was entered into the 13th Berlin International Film Festival. The film is about a group of old friends in Milan, all men in their late thirties, celebrating a chance reunion at a cinema in the suburbs (managed by one of them), and looking for encounters with women.

== Plot ==
Alberto and Sandrino, two old friends, meet by chance on the streets of Milan after many years. After a moment of embarrassment, memories and the light-heartedness of the past resurface. Sandrino offers to track down the others - Cesarino, Nino and Livio - and spend an evening like in the good old days.

Cesarino, who back in the old days was the animator of the group who got them into contact with girls, has not lost much in this sense although he faces economic difficulties. He manages a small cinema in the suburbs for his uncle, where the other friends go after having dinner. The evening passes between telephone calls of a pranky nature, car rides, and meetings of bizarre character.

In the early morning, Cesarino decides to track down Lara, who had spent time with the group. As the friends now find out, she had gotten arrested for a diamond robbery which she committed shortly after leaving the group, spent two years in jail, and now has become a street prostitute. Cesarino reaffirms her love for her, but when she sees the other friends watching them kiss, she runs away and joins her regular customers, the truckers. In wanting to redeem her, Cesarino runs after the truck and jumps on it. A fistfight with two truckers ensues, and Cesarino ends up beaten up and bleeding. Lara, saddened by this, still stays with the truckers, and Cesarino is taken care of by his friends. He finally leaves the group in a sad mood. Alberto promises he will ring him up, but although Cesarino appreciates the gesture, it feels as though he suspects he never will do so.

== Cast ==
- Walter Chiari as Cesarino
- Letícia Román as Carla
- Francisco Rabal as Alberto
- Riccardo Garrone as Sandrino
- Dominique Boschero as Tina (la triste)
- Mino Guerrini as Nino
- Paul Guers as Livio
- Gastone Moschin as Toro
- Jacqueline Pierreux as Lara (il Larone)
- Mimma Di Terlizzi as Maria

== Critical reception ==
According to Giuseppe Previti, the film's narration is "insightful and full of melancholy, enriched by a perfect performance by Walter Chiari, and at ease in representing the losers of the boom era" (Italian: acuta e piena di malinconia, impreziosita anche della interpretazione perfetta di Walter Chiari, a suo agio nel rappresentare gli sconfitti dell'era del boom).
