= The Brambilla Family Go on Holiday =

1941 film directed by Carl Boese

- Scene from the film
- Directed by: Carl Boese
- Written by: Vincenzo Rovi; Ákos Tolnay; Andrea Di Robilant
- Produced by: Andrea Di Robilant
- Starring: Cesco Baseggio; Massimo Girotti; Elena Luber; Amelia Chellini
- Cinematography: Fernando Risi
- Edited by: Duilio A. Lucarelli
- Music by: Gian Noceti Della Casa
- Production company: Sol Film
- Distributed by: Generalcine
- Release date: 18 December 1941
- Running time: 84 minutes
- Country: Italy
- Language: Italian

The Brambilla Family Go on Holiday (Italian: La famiglia Brambilla in vacanza) is a 1941 Italian "white-telephones" comedy film directed by Carl Boese, starring Cesco Baseggio, Massimo Girotti and Elena Luber.

== Synopsis ==
The film revolves around a middle-class Milanese family who go on holiday.

== Cast ==
- Cesco Baseggio as Ambrogio Brambilla
- Massimo Girotti as Marco Sassoli
- Elena Luber as Nanà Brambilla
- Amelia Chellini as Adalgisa Brambilla
- Paolo Stoppa as Gastone
- Giulio Stival as the tenor Alfredo Martelli
- Vita Bandini as Donna Fausta, the marchesa
- Umberto Cocchi as the night watchman
- Anita Farra as the art connoisseur
- Luigi Garrone as the manager of the garage
- Renato Malavasi as a friend of Marco
- Lina Tartara Minora as Pina, the maid
- Dina Romano as Maria, the concierge
- Giovanna Scotto as Marco's mother
- Liliana Zanardi as a girl at the bar
- Carmela Rossato
- Jole Ferrari
- Toscano Giuntini

== Bibliography ==
- Gundle, Stephen (2013). Mussolini's Dream Factory: Film Stardom in Fascist Italy. Berghahn Books. ISBN 978-1-78238-245-4.
