= His Last Twelve Hours =

1951 film

- Film poster
- Directed by: Luigi Zampa
- Written by: Cesare Zavattini; Suso Cecchi d'Amico; Vitaliano Brancati
- Produced by: Carlo Civallero
- Starring: Jean Gabin; Mariella Lotti; Elli Parvo
- Cinematography: Carlo Montuori
- Edited by: Eraldo Da Roma
- Music by: Nino Rota
- Production companies: Società Italiana Cines; Pathé Consortium Cinéma
- Distributed by: ENIC; Pathé Consortium Cinéma
- Release date: 14 February 1951
- Running time: 81 minutes
- Countries: France; Italy
- Language: Italian

His Last Twelve Hours (French: Pour l'amour du ciel, Italian: È più facile che un cammello...) is a 1951 French-Italian drama film directed by Luigi Zampa and starring Jean Gabin, Mariella Lotti and Elli Parvo. The film's sets were designed by the art director Gastone Medin. It was shot at the Centro Sperimentale di Cinematografia near Cinecittà in Rome.

== Plot ==
Died in a car accident, the wealthy footwear industrialist Carlo Bacchi finds himself in the afterlife, where he is condemned to hell for having committed evil when he was alive. Defending himself from the accusation in a passionate harangue, however, he manages to get back to earth for a few hours, in order to repair the evil committed and above all the bad deed that caused Amedeo Santini's attempted suicide.

== Cast ==
- Jean Gabin as Carlo Bacchi
- Mariella Lotti as Margot, Bacchi's wife
- Julien Carette as Amedeo Santini
- Elli Parvo as Lidia Guidi, Bacchi's friend
- Antonella Lualdi as Maria
- Antonietta Pietrosi as Anna, Carlo Bacchi's daughter
- Paola Borboni as Luisa
- Carlo Sposito as The Duke Sorino
- Marga Cella as Mrs. Gigliosi
- Fausto Guerzoni as A worker
- Piero Pastore as A working trade unionist
- Dante Maggio as The cobbler
- Enrico Luzi as Witness of the accident
- Dino Raffaelli as Giuseppe
- Bella Starace Sainati as Luisa, Bacchi's aunt
- Bice Valori as Witness of the accident

== Bibliography ==
- Chiti, Roberto & Poppi, Roberto. Dizionario del cinema italiano: Dal 1945 al 1959. Gremese Editore, 1991.
