= Diego Fabbri =

Italian playwright (1911–1980)

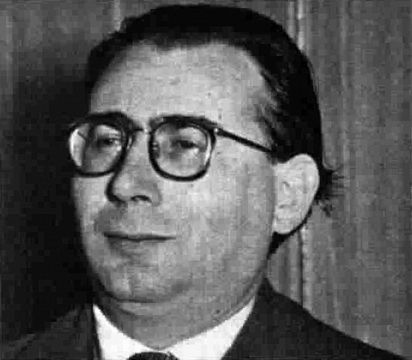
Diego Fabbri, 1954.

Diego Fabbri (July 2, 1911 – August 14, 1980) was an Italian playwright whose plays centered on religious (Catholic) themes.

== Early career ==
Fabbri graduated from the University of Bologna in 1936 with a degree in economics and business. But his writing career had begun well before that. His first play, The Flowers of Pain, was published in 1928. He followed it with The Node, which was banned by the fascist government.

In 1938, he collaborated with Guido Chiesa to write the play Absent. In 1939 Fabbri received an invitation to Rome, to become director of the Publisher Avenue. Then, in 1940, he was appointed secretary of the Catholic Film Center. He held the post until 1959. During this time, Fabbri began work on The Literary Fair. His co-director on this project was the poet Vincenzo Cardarelli. The project could not be completed until 1966, and Vincenzo Cardarelli did not live to see it.

Fabbri was particularly prolific in 1940. In that year, he wrote three plays: "Marshes", "Meadow", and "Fun". The following year he came out with "Orbits", which was staged at the Teatro Quirino in Rome. "Marshes" was staged in the same theater in 1942.

== Films ==
One of Fabbri's best known works is Inquisition, which was written in 1946. His career as a screenwriter and scriptwriter began with collaborations with directors as Vittorio De Sica, Alessandro Blasetti, and Germs. He also worked with other film makers such as Roberto Rossellini, Federico Fellini, Paw, Michelangelo Antonioni, René Clair, Luis Buñuel and Fleischer. In 1951 his The Seducer was represented. Fabbri wrote the screenplay for films like the Family Process (1953), The Liar (1954), Trial of Jesus (1955), Vigil of Arms (1956), Delirium (1957), Sons of Art (1959), Process Karamazov (1960), The Squirrel (1961), At the Table Do Not Talk About Love (1962), The Confidant (1964) and The Event (1967). Fabbri was head of the Roman Theatre La Cometa from 1960 to 1962. In 1968 he became President of ETI (Italian Theatre). His term there was marked by a policy of expansion and inculcating a theater culture throughout the country.

Fabbri commitment to creating a national theater is reflected in the declaration of the manifesto for a theater of the people, which he signed in 1943, along with other prominent literati such as Pandolfi and Pinelli. Fabbri was one of the founders of the National Union of Drama Writers in 1945.

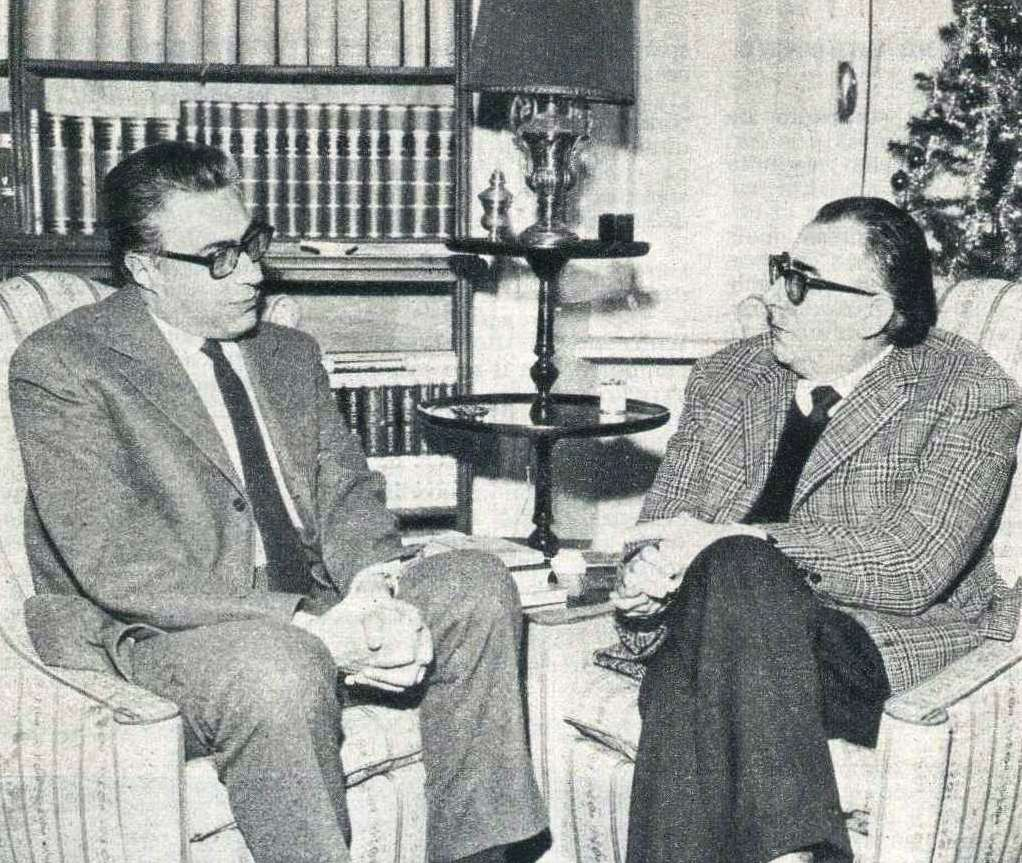
A 1964 photo showing Fabbri and Luigi Silori.

Fabbri was born in Forlì, where a theatre is named after him. His best known plays are Inquisizione (Inquisition) and Processo a Gesú (The Trial of Jesus). He died in Riccione.

== Works ==
- Rancore ("Rancor", 1946)
- Inquisizione ("Inquisition", 1950)
- Il seduttore ("The Seducer", 1951)
- Processo di famiglia ("Trial of the family", 1953)
- Processo a Gesù ("The Trial of Jesus", 1955)
- La bugiarda ("The Deceitful Woman", 1956)
- Veglia d'armi ("Vigil of Arms", 1956)

== Selected filmography ==
- The Ten Commandments (1945)
- The Gates of Heaven (1945)
- The Testimony (1946)
- Fugitive in Trieste (1951)
- The Corsican Brothers (1961)
- The Mysteries of Paris (1962)
- Destination Rome (1963)

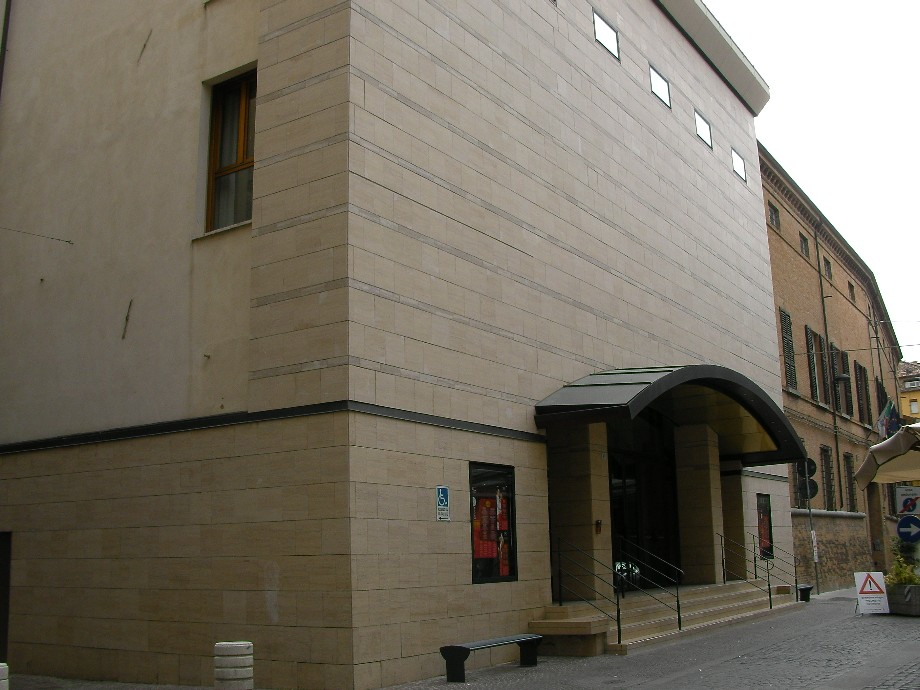
The Theater Diego Fabbri in Forlì.
