= Amalia Pellegrini =

Italian actress (1873–1958)

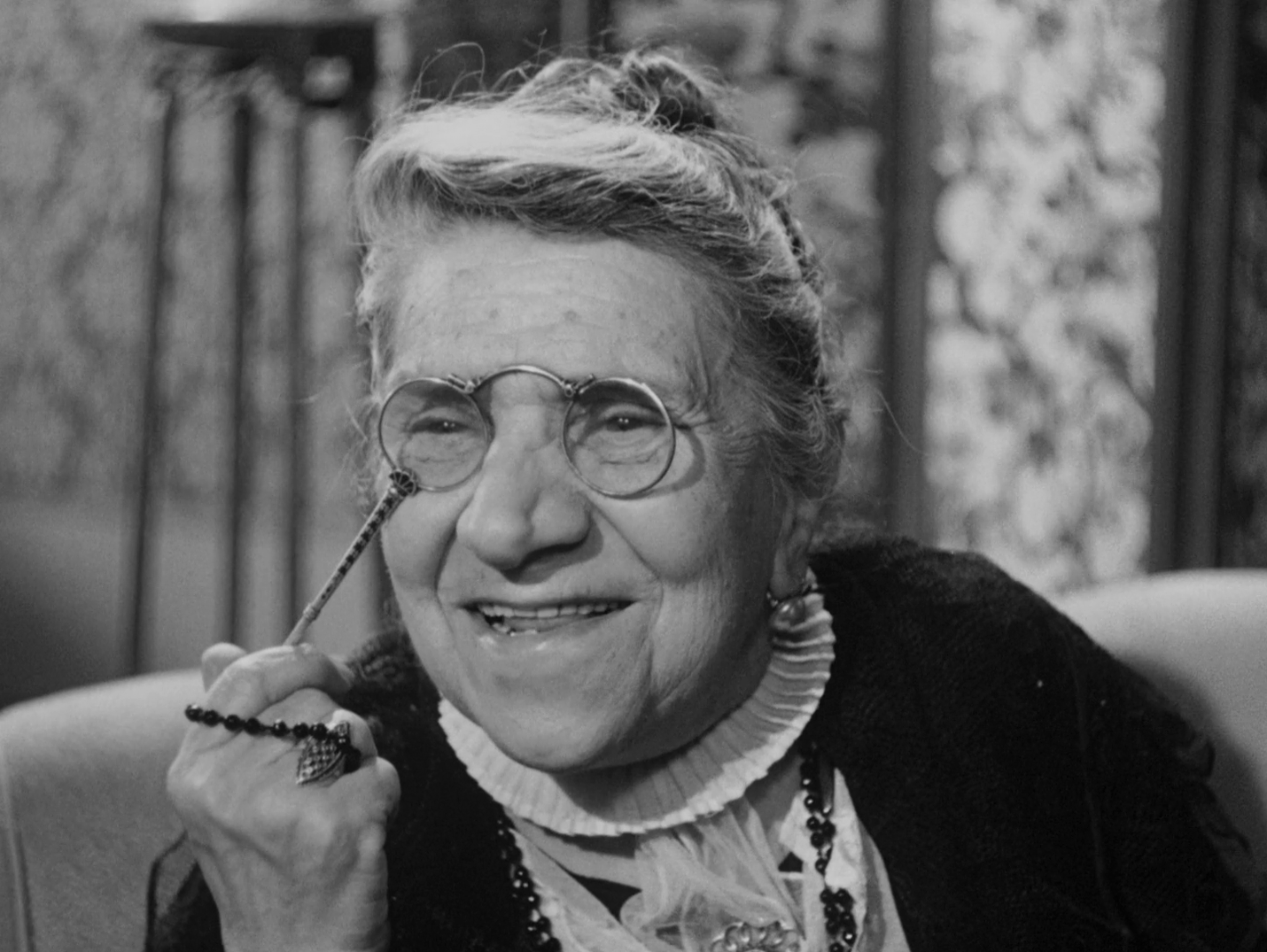
- Pellegrini in the movie An American in Rome (1954)
- Born: 16 June 1873; Vigevano, Pavia, Kingdom of Italy
- Died: 13 September 1958 (aged 85); New York City, U.S.
- Occupation: Actress
- Years active: 1935–1958

Amalia Pellegrini (16 June 1873 – 13 September 1958) was an Italian actress. She appeared in more than sixty films from 1935 to 1958.

== Selected filmography ==
| Year | Title | Role | Notes |
|---|---|---|---|
| 1958 | Angel in a Taxi | | |
| 1956 | Nero's Weekend | | |
| 1955 | The Miller's Beautiful Wife | | |
| 1955 | Bravissimo | | |
| 1955 | The Letters Page | | |
| 1954 | A Day in Court | | |
| 1952 | Altri tempi | | |
| 1952 | Melody of Love | | |
| 1950 | Chains | | |
| 1948 | Baron Carlo Mazza | | |
| 1946 | Un giorno nella vita | | |
| 1946 | The Ways of Sin | | |
| 1945 | The Ten Commandments | | |
| 1944 | The Materassi Sisters | | |
| 1942 | Jealousy | | |
| 1942 | Sealed Lips | | |
| 1940 | A Romantic Adventure | | |
| 1939 | The Carnival of Venice | | |
