= Aldo Palazzeschi =

Italian novelist, poet and essayist (1885–1974)

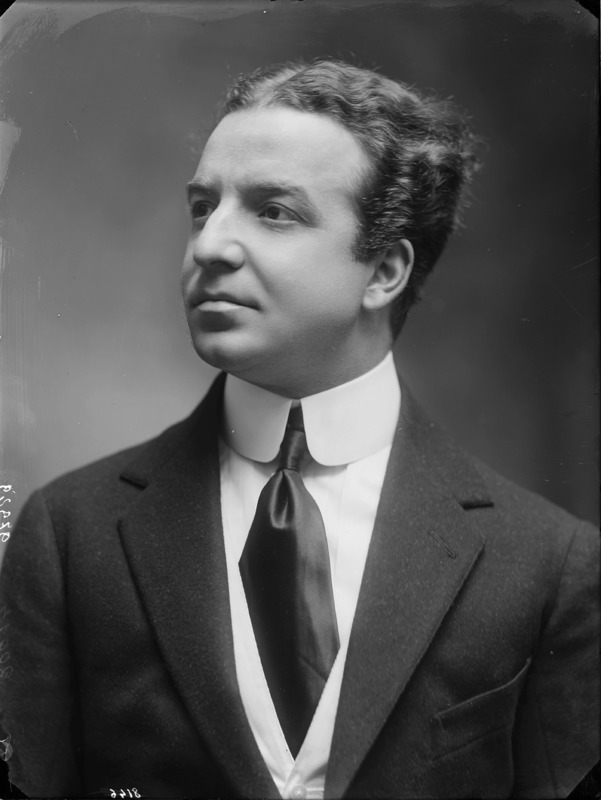
- Born: Aldo Giurlani; 2 February 1885; Florence, Italy
- Died: 17 August 1974 (aged 89); Rome, Italy
- Occupations: Poet; novelist; journalist; essayist
- Writing career
- Notable work: Man of Smoke
- Literary movement: Futurism

Signature
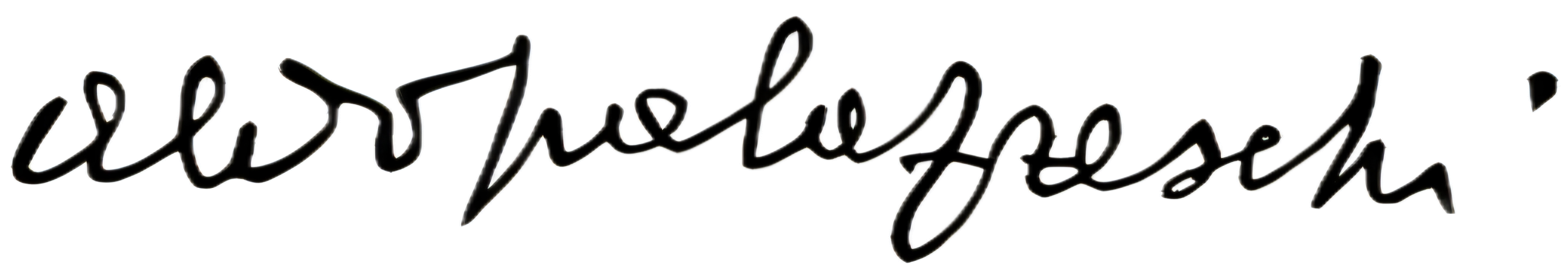

Aldo Giurlani (Italian pronunciation: [ˈaldo dʒurˈlaːni]; 2 February 1885 – 17 August 1974), known by the pen name Aldo Palazzeschi (pronounced [ˈaldo palatˈtseski]), was an Italian novelist, poet, journalist and essayist.

== Biography ==
He was born in Florence to a well-off, bourgeois family. Following his father's direction, he studied accounting but gave up that pursuit as he became enamoured with the theatre and acting. Respectful of his father's wishes that the family name not be associated with acting, he chose his maternal grandmother's maiden name Palazzeschi as a pseudonym. His family's comfortable circumstances enabled him to publish his first book of poetry, I cavalli bianchi (The White Horses) in 1905 using his acting pseudonym.

In Poemi (1909) he went against both symbolism and traditional views of the poet's public or moral role, by presenting himself as a circus performer and making personal suffering a matter of humour. When Marinetti was sent this volume, he warmly welcomed Palazzeschi into Futurism. For a few years Palazzeschi found Futurism's iconoclasm and solidarity congenial, although he never adopted its political ideology, machine aesthetics, or most radical literary techniques. Futurism stimulated the lively and subversive poems of L'incendiario (1910 ; enlarged 1913). They included parodies of the Romantic treatment of nature (‘I fiori’) and death (‘La fiera dei morti’), and a modernistic treatment of the convention of the lovers' walk beloved by D'Annunzio (‘La passeggiata’). His aesthetics of humour are expressed in his manifesto ‘Il controdolore’ and the poem ‘E lasciatemi divertire’, which, beneath apparent meaninglessness, poses fundamental questions about the nature of poetry in the modern world. His fantastic Futurist novel Il codice di Perelà (translated into English as Man of Smoke) published in 1911, has a quasi-Messianic protagonist, a man made of smoke and the epitome of ‘leggerezza’, who is in fact an allegory of the poet.

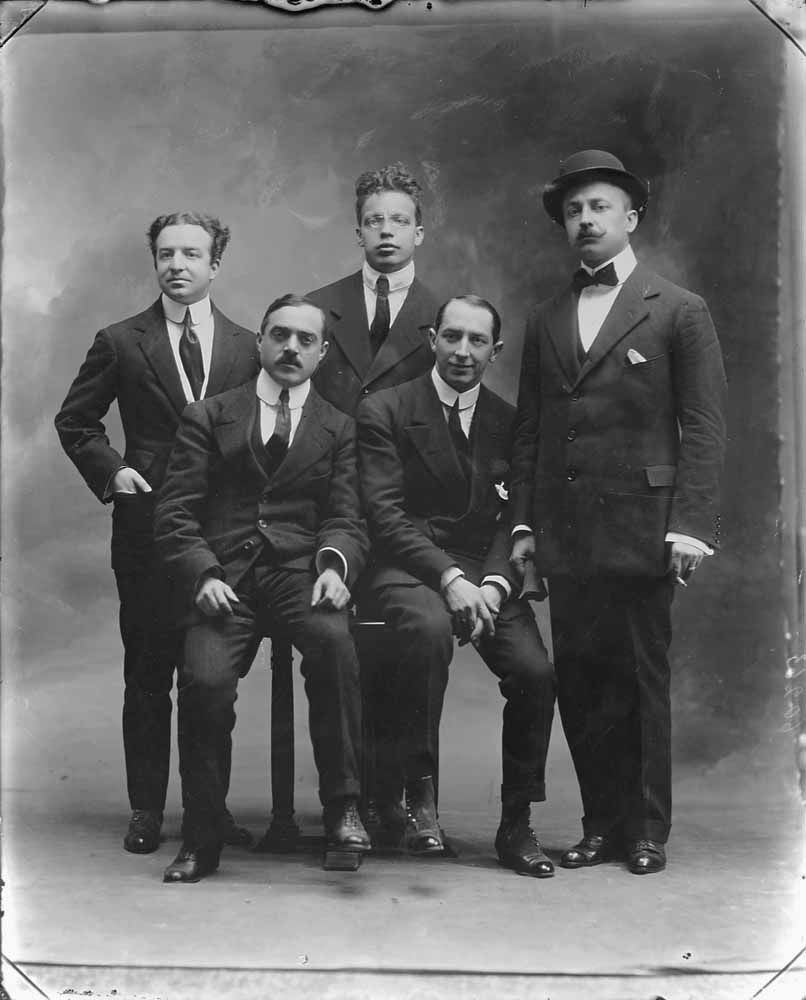
Palazzeschi, Carrà, Papini, Boccioni and Marinetti in the early 1910s

Palazzeschi helped establish the fruitful alliance between Futurism and the Lacerba group in 1913, which in turn brought him into closer contact with the Parisian avant-garde. However, he broke with Marinetti in April 1914 and associated himself with Papini and Soffici, the editors of Lacerba, when they ended the alliance in 1915, claiming polemically that, with their ironic approach to literature, they were the true Futurists. His experience of military life during World War I brought a new humanity to his writing, as is evident in his attacks on war in Due imperi … mancati (1920).

During the interwar years, his poetical production decreased, as he became involved in journalism and other pursuits. He took no part in the official culture of the Fascist regime but found himself working in various magazines that did. Some of those were Pegaso, Pan (edited by Ugo Ojetti), and Il Selvaggio (edited by Mino Maccari). He also enjoyed a successful career as a novelist and short-story writer, especially with Le sorelle Materassi (1934), which is typical in using more traditional forms but maintaining a comic tone in its presentation of unexceptional characters. He moved to Rome in 1941.

Towards the end of his life, amused by the new scholarly interest in such an anti-academic movement as Futurism, he returned briefly to poetry and the free-floating fantasy writing of his youth. In the late 1960s and early 1970s, he started publishing again, with a series of novels that resecured his place in the new, post-war avant-garde. He died in 1974 in his apartment in Rome.

== Legacy ==
Today he is often considered an important influence on later Italian writers, especially those of the neoavanguardia in both prose and verse. His work is well noted by its "grotesque and fantastic elements".

In 2003, French composer Pascal Dusapin composed the opera Perelà, uomo di fumo, which is based on the novel Il codice di Perelà by Palazzeschi.

== Published works ==
- I cavalli bianchi (1905)
- Lanterna (1907)
- Poemi (1909)
- L'incendiario (1910)
- Il codice di Perelà (1911)
- Il controdolore (1914)
- Due imperi... mancati (1920)
- L'interrogatorio della contessa Maria (1925)
- La piramide (1926)
- Stampe dell'Ottocento (1932)
- Sorelle Materassi (1934)
- Il palio dei buffi (1936)
- Allegoria di novembre (1943)
- Difetti 1905 (1947)
- I fratelli Cuccoli (1948)
- Bestie del '900 (1951)
- Roma (1953)
- Scherzi di gioventù (1956)
- Il buffo integrale (1966)
- Il doge (1967)
- Cuor mio (1968)
- Stefanino (1969)
- Storia di un'amicizia (1971)
- Via delle cento stelle (1972)
