= The Carnival of Venice (1939 film) =

1939 film

- Directed by: Giuseppe Adami; Giacomo Gentilomo
- Written by: Giuseppe Adami; Giacomo Gentilomo
- Produced by: Luciano Doria
- Starring: Cesco Baseggio; Toti Dal Monte; Junie Astor
- Cinematography: Renato Del Frate
- Edited by: Giacomo Gentilomo
- Music by: Gennaro Avitabile
- Production companies: Lupa Film; Romulus Film
- Distributed by: Romulus Film
- Release date: 16 November 1939
- Running time: 68 minutes
- Country: Italy
- Language: Italian

The Carnival of Venice (Italian: Il carnevale di Venezia) is a 1939 Italian comedy film directed by Giuseppe Adami and Giacomo Gentilomo, starring Cesco Baseggio, Toti Dal Monte and Junie Astor. It was made at the Cinecittà Studios in Rome.

== Cast ==
- Cesco Baseggio as Momolo
- Toti Dal Monte as Ninetta, his daughter
- Junie Astor as Tonina
- Guido Lazzarini as Paolo Sagredo
- Stefano Sibaldi as Marchetto Zanzi, the baker
- Greta Gonda as Margherita
- Alessandra Adari as tobacco factory employee
- Armando Annuale as curious elderly man
- Doris Cafioro
- Andreina Carli as snob friend of Paolo
- Rudi Dal Pra
- Loredana as tobacco factory employee
- Carmen Mauti
- Amalia Pellegrini as curious elderly lady

== Bibliography ==
- Luciano De Giusti. Giacomo Gentilomo, cineasta popolare. Kaplan, 2008.
