= Capodaglio =

Capodaglio is an Italian surname. Notable people with the surname include:

- Anna Capodaglio (1879–1961), Italian actress
- Wanda Capodaglio (1889–1980), Italian actress, sister of Anna
- Miranda Campa, born Liliana Campa Capodaglio (1914–1989)
