= Cele Abba =

Italian actress (1906–1992)

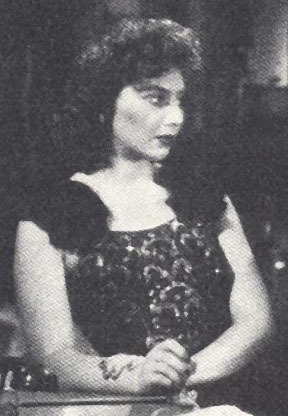
- Abba in the movie La Carne e l'Anima (1945)
- Born: 25 May 1906; Milan, Kingdom of Italy
- Died: 1 January 1992 (aged 85); Milan, Italy
- Occupation: Actress

Cele Abba (25 May 1906 – 1 January 1992) was an Italian actress and the sister of actress Marta Abba.

== Biography ==
Her career experienced some reflected light, conditioned by the great popularity obtained by her older sister, Marta, muse of Luigi Pirandello. The second daughter of the merchant Pompeo Abba and Giuseppina Trabucchi, she made her debut on the theatre stage next to her sister who wanted her by her side for the 1927–1928 season in the Pirandelliana Company directed by Pirandello himself.

In 1929–1930 she is a member of the Compagnia Teatrale Za-Bum, run by Mario Mattoli and in 1930–1931, she performed with Renzo Ricci, Irma Gramatica and Luigi Carini.

In the summer of 1931, she performed in the theatrical staging of Campo di Maggio, written and directed by Giovacchino Forzano. In the 1932–1933 season she acted with Ruggero Ruggeri and then in the summer of 1933, she was Ippolita in the cast of William Shakespeare's A Midsummer Night's Dream directed by Max Reinhardt with Carlo Lombardi, Giovanni Cimara, Nerio Bernardi, Rina Morelli, Sarah Ferrati, Cesare Bettarini, Armando Migliari, Ruggero Lupi, Luigi Almirante, Giuseppe Pierozzi, Memo Benassi, Evi Maltagliati and Eva Magni. The performances were held at the Boboli Gardens in Florence.

In the 1933–1934 season she played leading actress roles in Aristide Baghetti's company.

She lived for several years in Sanremo, until 1960, when she returned to settle permanently in her hometown of Milan.

== Selected filmography ==
- The Haller Case (1933)
- Passaporto rosso (1935)

== Legacy ==
Cele Abba was portrayed in the 2024 biopic about Luigi Pirandello, Eternal Visionary, by Anna Gargano.
