= Filippo Scelzo =

Italian actor (1900–1980)

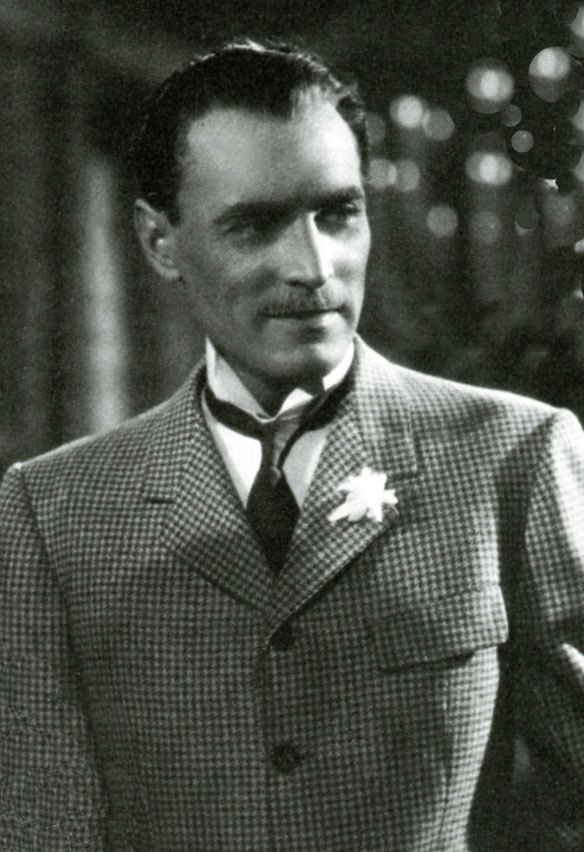
- Born: 19 April 1900; Ivrea, Piedmont, Italy
- Died: 9 October 1980 (aged 80); Rome, Lazio, Italy
- Occupation: Actor
- Years active: 1934–1972 (film)

Filippo Scelzo (19 April 1900 – 9 October 1980) was an Italian stage, film and television actor. He appeared in more than forty films including Red Passport in which he played the male lead.

== Life and career ==
Born in Ivrea, the son of the stage actress Lena Artale, Scelzo started his career at very young age in the theatrical companies of Ettore Paladini and Gualtiero Tumiati. After having worked with Ruggero Ruggeri, in 1923 he got his first leading roles with the stage company of Virgilio Talli. In the following years he continued an intense theatrical activity, working with prominent actors of the time such as Dina Galli, Irma Gramatica, Antonio Gandusio and Kiki Palmer, as well as in the Mario Mattoli's company Za Bum. In 1934 he started his long career in cinema, even if mostly cast in supporting and character roles. In 1937 he formed his own stage company, together with Gualtiero Tumiati, Enzo Biliotti and Margherita Bagni.

In later years, Scelzo maintained an extensive theatrical schedule, working alongside Vittorio Gassman, Anna Proclemer, Paola Borboni, Sarah Ferrati, Vivi Gioi, and also directing the company of Teatro delle Arti. He was also active as a television actor, and more sporadically as a dubber.

== Selected filmography ==
- Loyalty of Love (1934) - Il barone Salvotti
- Red Passport (1935) - Lorenzo Casati
- Tredici uomini e un cannone (1936) - Uomo #2
- Jeanne Doré (1938) - Perodot
- L'amor mio non muore! (1938)
- The Sons of the Marquis Lucera (1939) - Salvatore
- Le sorprese del divorzio (1939) - Enrico Duval
- Trial and Death of Socrates (1939) - Cebete
- Bridge of Glass (1940) - A Ponte de Vidro
- Kean (1940) - Il principe di Galles
- Piccolo alpino (1940) - Michele Rasi, suo padre
- Malombra (1942) - Un medico (uncredited)
- Piazza San Sepolcro (1942)
- Odessa in Flames (1942) - Michele Smirnoff
- Il nostro prossimo (1943) - Il padre di Paola
- The White Angel (1943) - Giovanni
- Tempesta sul golfo (1943) - Wolikof - il pittore
- La signora in nero (1943) - Raimondo
- Il fiore sotto gli occhi (1944) - Il proffesore Falcini
- No Turning Back (1945) - Guido Belluzzi
- The White Devil (1947) - Der Intelektuelle
- The Man with the Grey Glove (1948) - Tambroni
- The Earth Cries Out (1949) - Professore Taumen
- Romanticismo (1949) - General Rienz
- Duel Without Honor (1950)
- Il Brigante Musolino (1950) - Public prosecutor
- The Count of Saint Elmo (1951) - Mancini
- The Ungrateful Heart (1951) - Avvocato difensore
- Frontier Wolf (1951)
- A Thief in Paradise (1952) - Chirurgo
- La voce del sangue (1952) - Donato Scala
- Gli uomini non guardano il cielo (1952) - Cardinal Ferrari
- The Secret of Three Points (1952) - Avvocato Mottola
- The Enemy (1952) - Notaio Ragaldi
- Guilt Is Not Mine (1952)
- The Shadow (1954) - Il dottor Magre
- The Boatman of Amalfi (1954) - Padre Felice
- Io, Caterina (1957)
- Gold of Rome (1961) - Ludovico, President of the Jewish community
- The Verona Trial (1963) - Giovanni Marinelli
- Il Successo (1963) - Berto
- Corruption (1963) - Professore
- Pleasant Nights (1966) - Messer Bindo
- La bambolona (1968) - Giulio's father
- Bronte: cronaca di un massacro che i libri di storia non hanno raccontato (1972) - Padre Palermo (final film role)
