= The Lovers (1946 film) =

1946 film

- French film poster
- Directed by: Giacomo Gentilomo
- Written by: Gaspare Cataldo; Giacomo Gentilomo; F. Saranzi
- Starring: Gino Bechi
- Cinematography: Anchise Brizzi
- Music by: Ezio Carabella
- Release date: 26 October 1946
- Running time: 90 minutes
- Country: Italy
- Language: Italian

The Lovers (Italian: Amanti in fuga) is a 1946 Italian historical melodrama film directed by Giacomo Gentilomo. It was entered into the 1946 Cannes Film Festival.

== Cast ==
- Gino Bechi as Alessandro Stradella
- Annette Bach as Ortenzia Foscarini
- Ernesto Bianchi as Furlan
- Wanda Capodaglio as Madame Royal
- Emilio Cigoli
- Antonio Crast as Marco Foscarini
- Mario Gallina as Bottesin
- Kozma Kumani
- Armando Guarnieri
- Nino Marchetti
- Franca Marzi as Porzia
- Guido Morisi as Il capitano
- Carlo Ninchi
- Giovanni Petrucci (as Giovanni Petti)
- Lamberto Picasso as L'astrologo
- Gino Saltamerenda as Frate Nespola
- Fabrizio Sarazani
- Gualtiero Tumiati as Alvise Foscarini
