= Amleto Palermi =

Italian film director

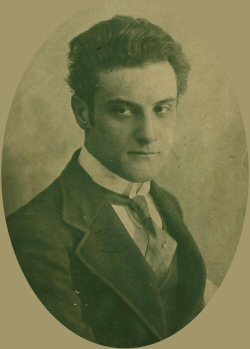
- Amleto Palermi in 1914
- Born: 11 July 1889; Rome, Kingdom of Italy
- Died: 20 April 1941 (aged 51); Rome, Kingdom of Italy
- Occupations: Film director Screenwriter
- Years active: 1914-1942
- Spouse: Ida Molinaro

Amleto Palermi (11 July 1889 – 20 April 1941) was an Italian film director and screenwriter. He directed more than 70 films between 1914 and 1942. He directed The Old Lady, which starred Vittorio De Sica in his first sound film.

== Biography ==
=== Early life and career ===
Amleto Palermi was born in Romeon 11 July 1889, the third child of journalist Raoul Vittorio Palermi and Emilia Scarpelli. A few months after his birth, his family moved to Palermo, where his father took over the editorship of the daily newspaper Giornale di Sicilia.

From a young age, Palermi devoted himself to scriptwriting. Between 1908 and 1919, before returning to Rome, he wrote several plays, including U lupu, Il tesoro d'Isacco, La vela grande and Il primo amore, which were performed by several amateur dramatic societies on national stages.

=== Film director ===
In 1914, Palermi was hired as a director by the Turin-based production company Gloria Film, officially entering the world of cinema. He secured contracts with other well-known national companies, including Augustus Film, Cosmopolis, Cines and Rinascimento Film. He co-directed his first movie, the drama L'orrendo blasone (1914), with the Italian actor and filmmaker Mario Bonnard. Until the 1920s, he directed numerous films at a frenetic pace, many of which were milestones of Italian silent cinema and starred some of the most popular actors.

He made his directorial debut with the melodrama Colei che tutto soffre (1914), followed by Il diritto di uccidere in the same year. During the second half of the 1910s, he directed several films, including Carnevalesca, starring Lyda Borelli and Livio Pavanelli (1916), for which he co-wrote the screenplay with Lucio D'Ambra. He also directed Soava Gallone in Madre (1916). In 1920, he directed Pina Menichelli in The Story of a Poor Young Man. Menichelli went on to star in several of Palermi's films, including The Second Wife (1922), La dama de Chez Maxim's (1923) and Take Care of Amelia (1925). Palermi also worked as an actor in supporting roles and wrote screenplays for other directors, such as Mario Caserini (La Pantomima della Morte) and Mario Almirante (La Chiromante). In the 1920s, he married Ida Molinaro, with whom he had three children.

=== The crisis of Italian cinema ===
In 1925, Palermi's career suffered a temporary setback. He was unable to finish directing The Last Days of Pompeii, the last major production of Italian silent cinema. The commercial failure of this historical epic, the third film adaptation of Edward Bulwer-Lytton's novel after those of 1908 and 1913, marked the end of the Golden age of Italian silent cinema. Palermi was forced to emigrate to Germany in the hope of better fortune, and Carmine Gallone was tasked with completing the film in 1926.

Poster for Palermi's Die Flucht in die Nacht (The Flight in the Night)

In 1926, Palermi directed The Flight in the Night, an adaptation of Pirandello's Henry IV starring Conrad Veidt, Robert Scholz and Angelo Ferrari. In 1929, he directed his last silent film, La Straniera. In spring 1930, Palermi directed the first Italian-language sound film, Perché no?, which was shot shot at the European studios of the American production company Paramount Pictures in Joinville-le-Pont, France.

=== Back to Italy ===
After co-directing La Femme d'une nuit (1931) with Guido Brignone, Palermi moved back to Italy, where he directed several genre films starring some of the great names of Italian cinema, such as Emma Gramatica, Armando Falconi, Isa Miranda, Angelo Musco, Nino Besozzi, Sergio Tofano, Vittorio De Sica, and Fosco Giachetti. His masterpieces are considered Cavalleria rusticana (1939), Saint John, the Beheaded, and The Sinner (both 1940).

The Sinner, which premiered on 6 May 1940, starred Fosco Giachetti, Vittorio De Sica, Paola Barbara, Gino Cervi and Umberto Melnati. It renewed Italian dramatic cinema and was the first film shot in the sound stage of the Centro Sperimentale di Cinematografia, one of the most modern in Europe at the time. Luigi Chiarini, the president of the Centro Sperimentale, played an active role in directing the film and wrote the screenplay together with Umberto Barbaro and Francesco Pasinetti.

Palermi directed what became his final film, L'elisir d'amore, inspired by Gaetano Donizetti's opera of the same name, in 1941, then fell ill with what was possibly meningitis and died in Rome on 20 April 1941.

== Selected filmography ==
=== Silent films ===
Year	Title	Preservation status
1920	The Story of a Poor Young Man	Lost
1922	The Second Wife	Lost
1923	La dama de Chez Maxim's	Lost
1926	The Last Days of Pompeii	Cineteca di Bologna, National Museum of Cinema and British Film Institute
1926	The Flight in the Night	Public domain
1927	Floretta and Patapon	Lost
1928	The Confessions of a Woman	National Museum of Cinema

Sound films

Year	Title	Notes
1932	The Old Lady	First sound movie starring Vittorio De Sica
1932	Zaganella and the Cavalier	Also known as Zaganella and the Honorable Gentleman
1933	Everybody's Secretary	
1933	Nini Falpala	
1934	Port	
1934	Creatures of the Night	
1934	The Matchmaker	
1936	God's Will Be Done	
1937	Il signor Max	
1937	To Live	
1937	The Two Misanthropists	
1937	The Black Corsair	
1938	Naples of Olden Times	
1938	Departure	
1938	The Two Mothers	
1939	Naples Will Never Die	
1939	The Sons of the Marquis Lucera	
1940	Saint John, the Beheaded	
1940	The Sinner	First film shot in the sound stage of the Centro Sperimentale di Cinematografia
1941	The Happy Ghost	
