= Wanda Capodaglio =

Italian actress (1889–1980)

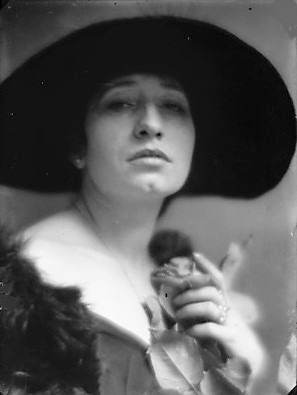
- Capodaglio in 1919
- Born: 1 January 1889; Asti, Kingdom of Italy
- Died: 30 August 1980 (aged 91); Castelfranco di Sopra, Arezzo, Italy
- Occupation: Actress
- Years active: 1914–1970
- Relatives: Ruggero Capodaglio (brother); Anna Capodaglio (sister-in-law)

Wanda Capodaglio (1 January 1889 – 30 August 1980) was an Italian film actress. She appeared in 30 films between 1914 and 1970. Her brother Ruggero was married to actress Anna Capodaglio (the stage name of Anna Adele Alberta Gramatica) who was also the sister of actresses Emma Gramatica and Irma Gramatica.

== Filmography ==
Year	Title	Role	Notes
1914	The Naked Truth	Principessa	
1915	The Wedding March		
1939	Piccolo hotel		
1942	The Queen of Navarre	Una dama di corte	
1942	Before the Postman	La signora Camilla	
1942	Torrents of Spring	La zia di Ilse	
1942	Jealousy	La baronessa Santina di Lagomorto	
1943	Two Suffer Better Than One	La signora Lanzi	
1944	Tears of Blood	Filomena	
1944	Resurrection	Zia Sofia	
1946	The Models of Margutta	Evelina	
1946	The Lovers	Madame Royal	
1947	La monaca di Monza		
1948	Crossroads of Passion		
1949	Il grido della terra		
1950	The Bread Peddler	Prefect's Wife	
1952	The Woman Who Invented Love		
1954	Chronicle of Poor Lovers	La Signora	
1966	Nessuno mi può giudicare	Laura's granny	
1967	Il ragazzo che sapeva amare		
1968	Io ti amo	Principessa di Castelvolturno	
1969	Oh, Grandmother's Dead	Adelaide Ghia, the grandmother	
