= Gino Sensani =

Italian costume designer

- Born: 26 November 1888; San Casciano, Tuscany, Italy
- Died: 14 December 1947 (aged 59); Rome, Lazio, Italy
- Other name: Gino Carlo Sensani
- Occupation: Costume designer
- Years active: 1932–1948 (film)

Gino Sensani (1888–1947) was an Italian costume designer who worked on over eighty films during his career.

== Selected filmography ==
- Loyalty of Love (1934)
- Naples of Former Days (1938)
- Kean (1940)
- Beatrice Cenci (1941)
- Pirates of Malaya (1941)
- The Countess of Castiglione (1942)
- Flesh Will Surrender (1947)
- The Brothers Karamazov (1947)
- Daniele Cortis (1947)

== Bibliography ==
- Reich, Jacqueline & Garofalo, Piero. Re-viewing Fascism: Italian Cinema, 1922-1943. Indiana University Press, 2002.
