= Tragic Spell =

- Italian theatrical release poster
- Directed by: Mario Sequi
- Written by: Luigi Bonelli; Vinicio Marinucci; Mario Sequi
- Produced by: Tony Roma
- Starring: María Félix; Rossano Brazzi; Massimo Serato
- Cinematography: Piero Portalupi
- Edited by: Guido Bertoli
- Music by: Roman Vlad
- Production company: Epic Films
- Distributed by: Lux Film
- Release date: 13 October 1951
- Running time: 95 minutes
- Country: Italy
- Language: Italian

Tragic Spell (Italian: Incantesimo tragico (Oliva)) is a 1951 Italian historical melodrama film directed by Mario Sequi and starring María Félix, Rossano Brazzi and Massimo Serato.

It was shot at Cinecittà Studios in Rome. The film's sets were designed by the art director Saverio D'Eugenio.

== Cast ==
- María Félix as Oliva
- Rossano Brazzi as Pietro
- Massimo Serato as Berto
- Charles Vanel as Bastiano
- Irma Gramatica as Grandmother
- Giulio Donnini as L'orafo Golia
- Italia Marchesini as Adele
- Fiorella Betti as Cleofe
- Fausto Guerzoni as Girasole
- Wanda Carpentieri as Berto's Girlfriend
- Franco Coop as Cavaliere
- Maria Zanoli as Witch
- Ada Dondini as Gesuina
- Giovanni Barrella
- Paola Quattrini as Camilla
- Vittoria Febbi as Maria
- Maria Piazzai as Zaira
- Angelo Dessy as Farmer
- Lita Perez
- Christina Thorer
- Ettore Vincelli
- Anna Maestri as Oliva's Maid
- Armando Annuale as Orator at Engagement Party
- Nino Capozzi as Party Guest

== Bibliography ==
- Darby, William (1991-12-01). Masters of Lens and Light: A Checklist of Major Cinematographers and Their Feature Films. Scarecrow Press, Bloomsbury Academic. ISBN 978-0-8108-2454-6.
