= Mario Gallina =

Italian actor (1889–1950)

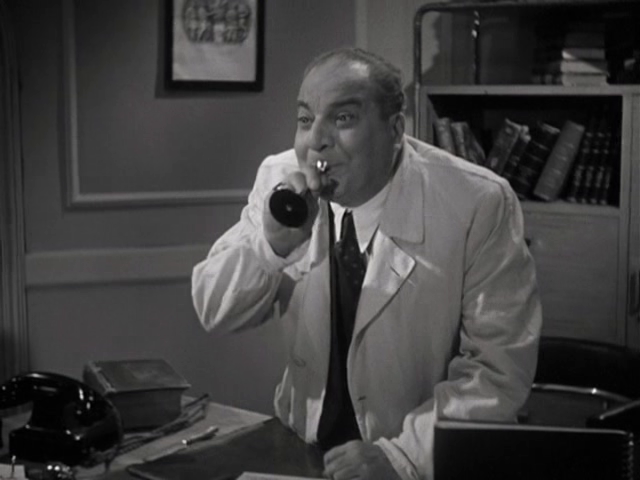
- Gallina in The Children Are Watching Us (1943)
- Born: 23 March 1889; Trieste, Austria-Hungary
- Died: 26 September 1950 (aged 61); Milan, Italy
- Occupations: Actor; voice actor
- Years active: 1911–1950
- Spouse: Maria Sainati
- Parents: Enrico Gallina (father); Elena Fabbri (mother)
- Relatives: Giacinto Gallina (uncle)

Mario Gallina (23 March 1889 – 26 September 1950) was an Italian actor and voice actor.

== Biography ==
Gallina was born in Trieste, which was then a possession of Austria-Hungary (now Italy). He was the son of theatre actors Enrico Gallina and Elena Fabbri and the nephew of playwright Giacinto Gallina. He began his career in 1911 working as a theatre actor, starring in many plays and working alongside other stage icons such as Enrico Viarisio, Marga Cella and Alfredo Sainati. Gallina was mainly active on stage and screen. He appeared in over 28 films between 1916 and 1950.

In 1933, Gallina sought a career as a screen actor and later, a voice dubber. He had already starred in two silent films between 1916 and 1917. Among his most popular filmography includes the 1943 film The Children Are Watching Us directed by Vittorio De Sica. He also provided the Italian voice of Honest John in the 1940 animated film Pinocchio as well as the Ringmaster in Dumbo.

== Death ==
Gallina died in Milan on 26 September 1950 at the age of 61.

== Filmography ==
=== Cinema ===
- Cura di baci (1916)
- I fioretti di San Francisco (1917)
- Nini Falpala (1933)
- La signorina dell'autobus (1933)
- Just Married (1934)
- I'll Give a Million (1935)
- Cinema che passione (1935)
- Ginevra degli Almieri (1935)
- Adam's Tree (1936)
- The Former Mattia Pascal (1937)
- Scipio Africanus: The Defeat of Hannibal (1937)
- L'amor mio non muore! (1938)
- Ettore Fieramosca (1938)
- The Silent Partner (1939)
- L'arcidiavolo (1940)
- Marco Visconti (1941)
- Carmen (1942)
- Princess Cinderella (1942)
- The Children Are Watching Us (1943)
- What a Distinguished Family (1943)
- Rosalba (1944)
- The Lovers (1946)
- Fire Over the Sea (1947)
- The White Devil (1947)
- L'isola di Montecristo (1948)
- La Rosa di Bagdad (1949) - Voice
- Beauty and the Devil (1950)
- Father's Dilemma (1950)

== Dubbing roles ==
=== Animation ===
- Honest John in Pinocchio
- Ringmaster in Dumbo

=== Live action ===
- High Sheriff of Nottingham in The Adventures of Robin Hood
- Capt. Wilkens in Fort Apache
- Sheriff Hardy in Duel in the Sun
- Hubert de Clermont-Latour in Odette
- Sir Thomas in The Picture of Dorian Gray
