= Port (film) =

1934 film

- Directed by: Amleto Palermi
- Written by: Amleto Palermi; Tomaso Smith
- Starring: Irma Gramatica; Camillo Pilotto; Elsa De Giorgi
- Cinematography: Anchise Brizzi
- Music by: Cesare A. Bixio
- Release date: 1934
- Running time: 83 minutes
- Country: Italy
- Language: Italian

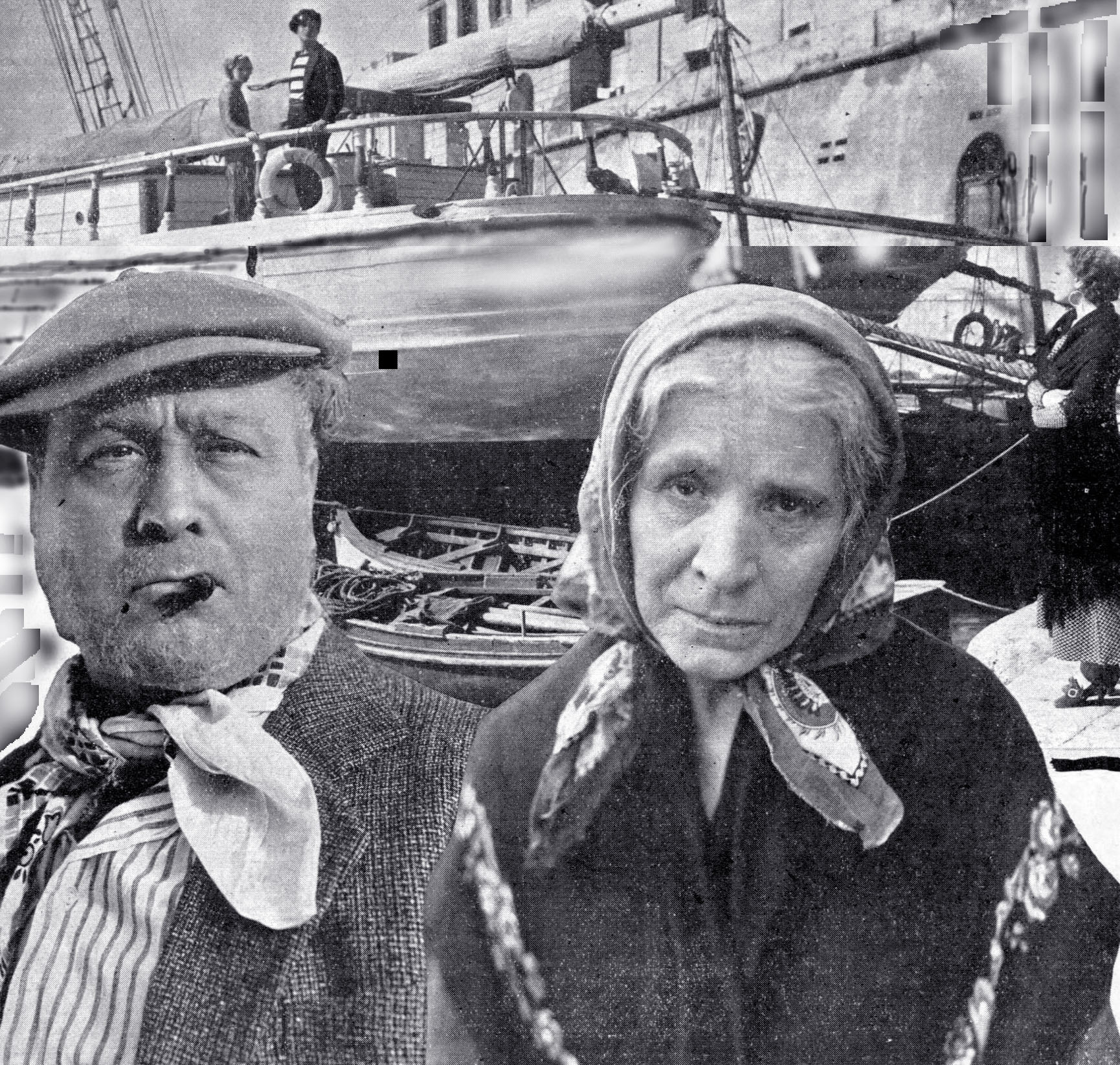

Port (Italian: Porto) is a 1934 Italian drama film directed by Amleto Palermi and starring Irma Gramatica, Camillo Pilotto and Elsa De Giorgi.

== Cast ==
- Irma Gramatica as Maria
- Camillo Pilotto as Mastro Vanni
- Elsa De Giorgi as Mariuccia
- Nerio Bernardi as Pietro Sgamba
- Giovanni Grasso as Nicola Bellamonte
- Piero Pastore as Salvatore - il fidanzato di Maria
- Tonino Capitani as Il piccolo Tonino
- Enrica Fantis as Agata
- Ruggero Orlando
- Massimo Ungaretti

== Bibliography ==
- Aprà, Adriano. The Fabulous Thirties: Italian cinema 1929-1944. Electa International, 1979.
