= Giulio Donadio =

Italian actor and film director

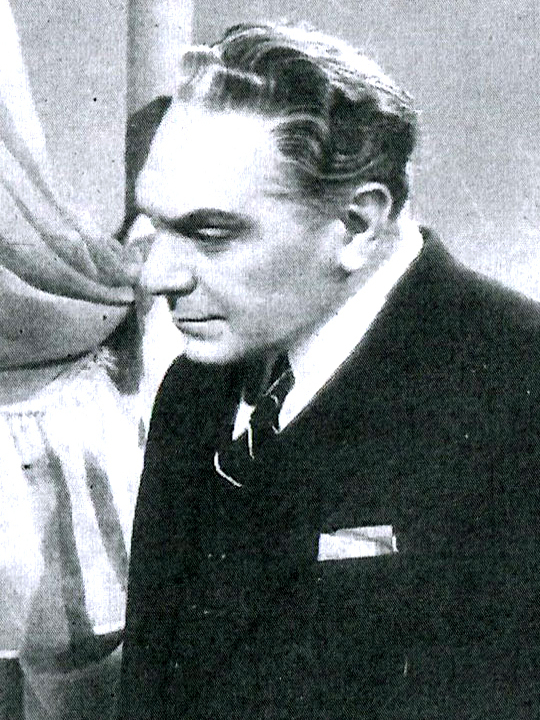
- Donadio in The Actor Who Disappeared (1941)
- Born: 5 July 1889; Santa Maria Capua Vetere, Campania; Italy
- Died: 15 June 1951 (aged 61); Rome, Lazio; Italy
- Occupations: Actor; Director
- Years active: 1912–1947 (film)

Giulio Donadio (5 July 1889 – 15 June 1951) was an Italian actor and film director. Donadio appeared in over forty films between 1912 and 1947, including the historical melodrama Red Passport (1935). He also directed several films during the silent era.

== Selected filmography ==
- The Danube Boatman (1914)
- The Bandit of Port Avon (1914)
- Full Speed (1934)
- Villafranca (1934)
- Red Passport (1935)
- A Woman Between Two Worlds (1936)
- The Anonymous Roylott (1936)
- Manon Lescaut (1940)
- Eternal Melodies (1940)
- Inspector Vargas (1940)
- The Happy Ghost (1941)
- Beatrice Cenci (1941)
- The Actor Who Disappeared (1941)
- The Prisoner of Santa Cruz (1941)
- Sealed Lips (1942)
- Life of Donizetti (1947)

== Bibliography ==
- Landy, Marcia. The Folklore of Consensus: Theatricality in the Italian Cinema, 1930-1943. SUNY Press, 1998.
