= Roldano Lupi =

Italian actor

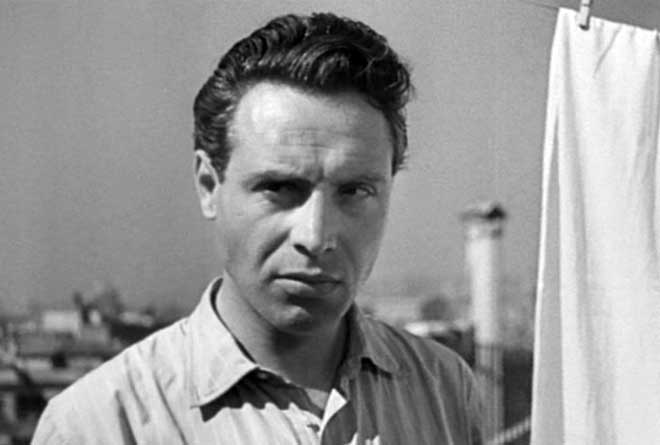
- Lupi in The Testimony (1946)
- Born: 8 February 1909; Milan, Italy
- Died: 14 August 1989 (aged 80); Rome, Italy
- Occupation: Actor
- Years active: 1942–1967

Roldano Squassoni, known professionally as Roldano Lupi (8 February 1909 – 14 August 1989) was an Italian film actor. He appeared in 60 films between 1942 and 1967. He was born in Milan, Italy and died in Rome, Italy.

== Selected filmography ==
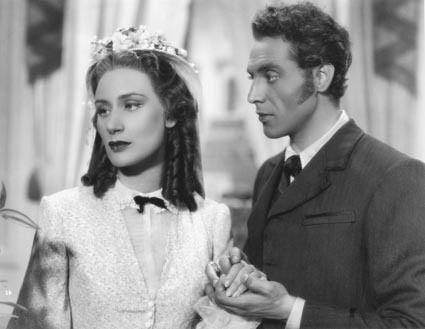
Lupi with Evi Maltagliati in Yes, Madam (1942)

- Jealousy (1942)
- Yes, Madam (1942)
- Farewell Love! (1943)
- The Priest's Hat (1944)
- The Za-Bum Circus (1944)
- The Gates of Heaven (1945)
- No Turning Back (1945)
- The Ten Commandments (1945)
- The Testimony (1946)
- The Adulteress (1946)
- Flesh Will Surrender (1947)
- The White Devil (1947)
- Cab Number 13 (1948)
- Prelude to Madness (1948)
- The Howl (1948)
- The Man with the Grey Glove (1948)
- Sicilian Uprising (1949)
- Altura (1949)
- The Angel of Sin (1952)
- Wolves Hunt at Night (1952)
- Koenigsmark (1953)
- Frine, Courtesan of Orient (1953)
- House of Ricordi (1954)
- The Contessa's Secret (1954)
- Crossed Swords (1954)
- The Affair of the Poisons (1955)
- The Courier of Moncenisio (1956)
- The Mongols (1961)
- Avenger of the Seven Seas (1962)
- Kali Yug: Goddess of Vengeance (1963)
- The Mystery of the Indian Temple (1963)
- La vendetta dei gladiatori (1964)
