= Tomaso Smith =

Italian writer, journalist and politician

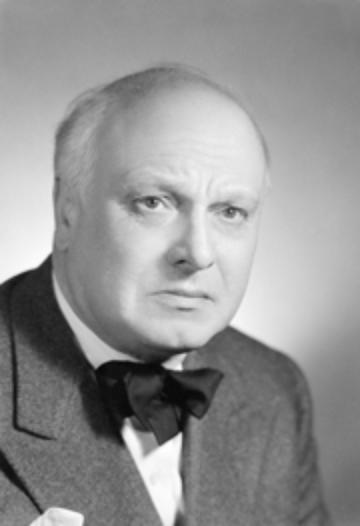
- Born: 15 June 1886; Bagni di Lucca, Tuscany, Italy
- Died: 27 May 1966 (aged 79); Rome, Lazio, Italy
- Occupation: Screenwriter
- Years active: 1931–1944 (film)
- Parents: Arnaldo Smith (father); Alice Olivieri (mother)

Tomaso Smith (15 June 1886 – 27 May 1966) was an Italian screenwriter, politician, journalist, translator and newspaper editor active during the Fascist era. He started his career as a stringer for the Roman newspaper Il Messaggero but was forced to resign for his socialist stance. He then embarked on a career as a screenwriter and playwright until the outbreak of the War. Smith was imprisoned in a German detention camp in Italy in 1943 but was able to escape. At the end of the war Il Messaggero offered him the editor's post. In the 1950s he began a career in politics, first as an independent with the Italian Communist Party and then with Adriano Olivetti's Community Movement, where he was involved in attempts to start a newspaper, La Giustizia ("Justice").

== Selected filmography ==
- Figaro and His Great Day (1931)
- The Blue Fleet (1932)
- The Last Adventure (1932)
- The Blind Woman of Sorrento (1934)
- Loyalty of Love (1934)
- Port (1934)
- Red Passport (1935)
- To Live (1937)
- The Fornaretto of Venice (1939)
- The Widow (1939)
- Father For a Night (1939)
- Kean (1940)
- Lucrezia Borgia (1940)
- The King's Jester (1941)
- Beatrice Cenci (1941)
- The Gorgon (1942)
- The Woman of Sin (1942)
- Maria Malibran (1943)
- The Champion (1943)
- Resurrection (1944)

== Bibliography ==
- Matilde Hochkofler. Anna Magnani. Gremese Editore, 2001.
