= Henry IV (Pirandello play) =

1921 play by Luigi Pirandello

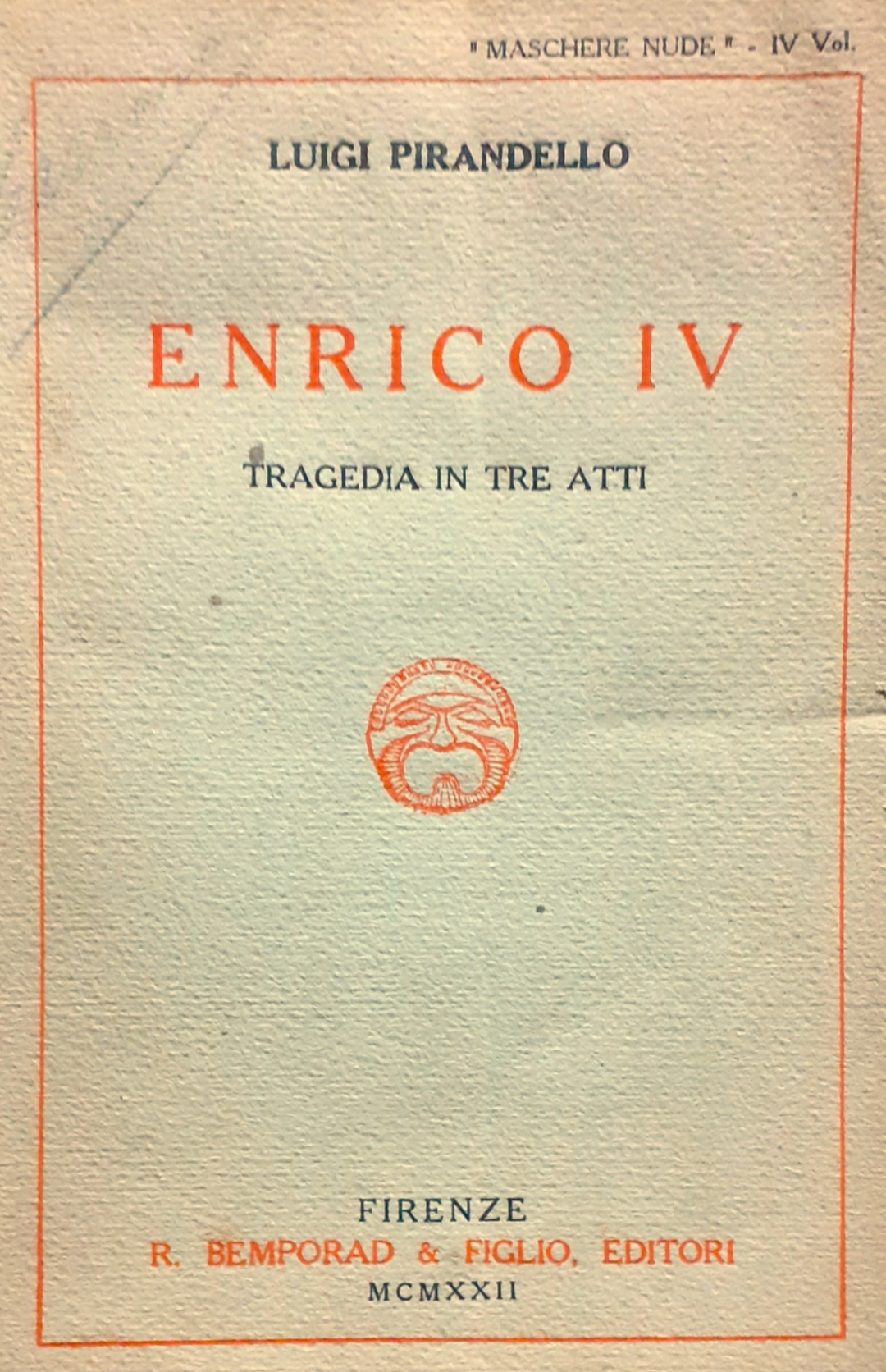
Enrico IV

Henry IV (Italian: Enrico IV [enˈriːko ˈkwarto]) is an Italian play (Enrico IV) by Luigi Pirandello written in 1921 and premiered to general acclaim at the Teatro Manzoni in Milan on 24 February 1922. A study on madness with comic and tragic elements, it is about a man who believes himself to be Henry IV, Holy Roman Emperor. It has been adapted and translated into English by Tom Stoppard, among others. Rex Harrison starred in a British production which was translated by Stephen Rich, and went to Broadway in 1973.

Paul Scofield famously starred as the title character in a 1959 BBC Television "World Theatre" adaptation of the play.

== Plot overview ==
An unnamed Italian aristocrat falls off his horse while playing the role of Henry IV, Holy Roman Emperor during carnevale festivities, which take place annually before Lent. After he comes to, he believes himself to be Henry. For the next twenty years, his family, including his sister and now his nephew, Marchese Carlo Di Nolli, maintain an elaborate charade in a remote Umbrian villa, decorated to resemble Henry's imperial palace at Goslar and staffed with servants hired to play the roles of Henry's privy councillors and simulate the eleventh-century court.

De Nolli's dying mother requests that he bring a doctor, Dionisio Genoni, who is referred to as the latest in a succession to try to cure Henry. All the action of the play occurs on the day of the doctor's visit.

Accompanying de Nolli and the doctor are:

- Lady Matilda Spina, (whom Henry loved, unrequited, before the accident), a widow. A portrait of the young Matilda in costume from the pageant, dressed as Matilda of Tuscany hangs on the wall of the throne room.
- Frida, her daughter, de Nolli's fiancée. Frida is now the spitting image of her mother as she was then.
- Baron Tito Belcredi, Matilda's lover
- Two valets in costume
- Giovanni, an old servant
- Four so-called Privy Counselors: Landolph (Lolo), Harold (Franco), Ordulph (Momo), Berthold (Fino)

In the first two acts the visitors play parts from the period whilst interacting with Henry.

The play begins with the induction of Berthold into the band of privy councillors. He has prepared for the part by studying the history of the wrong Henry—Henry IV of France. The visitors then arrive and are later introduced to Henry. Henry mistakes the disguised Belcredi for the monk Peter Damian and reacts angrily, but is later calmed.

Act two begins with speculation among the visitors about Henry, as well as what he sees in Matilda, who argues constantly with Belcredi. Henry enters once more and his behaviour is increasingly erratic. Once the visitors arrive Henry declares to his councillors that he is not truly mad, but has been aware of the nature of his existence for some time. However he has preferred to stay as he was than to live in the 20th century (the play is set around 1900). His behaviour and speech remain abnormal.

Upon learning of this revelation the visitors confront Henry, who acts angrily to them, particularly Belcredi. At the end of the act he grabs Frida, who is dressed as in the portrait in preparation for the Doctor's plan to shock Henry out of his madness. In the ensuing altercation Henry stabs Belcredi. The visitors flee, and Henry resumes his regal persona as the curtain falls.

== Translations into English ==
- Edward Storer (E. P. Dutton & Co., 1922)
- Frederick May (Penguin, 1960)
- Julian Mitchell (1979)
- Robert Rietty and John Wardle (Calder, 1987)
- Mark Musa (Penguin, 1996)
- Tom Stoppard (Faber & Faber, 2004)
- Anthony Mortimer (Oxford, 2014)
- Justin Fleming (Sydney, 2023)

== Adaptations ==
An early film adaptation of Pirandello's play, titled The Flight in the Night and starring Conrad Veidt, Robert Scholz, and Angelo Ferrari, was directed by Amleto Palermi in 1926. The play was later adapted into a film of the same name by Marco Bellocchio in 1984. Bellocchio's film stars Marcello Mastroianni and Claudia Cardinale, and has music by Astor Piazzolla.
