= The Actor Who Disappeared =

1941 film

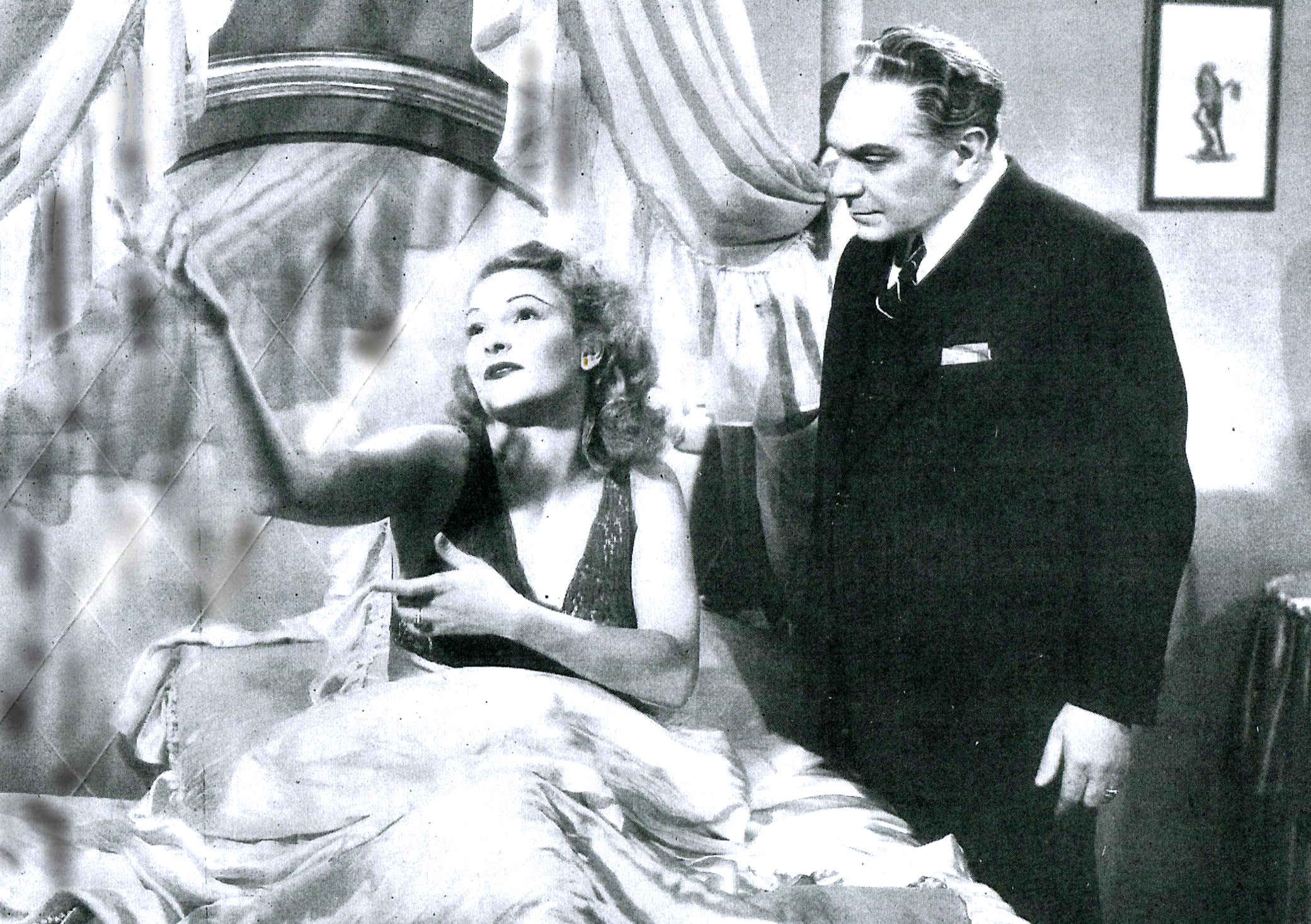
- Vivi Gioi and Giulio Donadio in the film
- Directed by: Luigi Zampa
- Written by: Guglielmo Usellini; Luigi Zampa
- Based on: Was wird hier gespielt? by Theo Lingen
- Produced by: Raimondo Perretta
- Starring: Vivi Gioi; María Mercader; Giulio Donadio
- Cinematography: Domenico Scala
- Edited by: Tullio Chiarini
- Music by: Salvatore Allegra
- Production company: Imperial Film
- Distributed by: Industrie Cinematografiche Italiane
- Release date: 2 June 1941
- Running time: 78 minutes
- Country: Italy
- Language: Italian

The Actor Who Disappeared (Italian: L'attore scomparso) is a 1941 Italian comedy mystery crime film directed by Luigi Zampa and starring Vivi Gioi, María Mercader and Giulio Donadio. It is a remake of the German film Was wird hier gespielt? (1940) based on the eponymous play by Theo Lingen. It was shot at the Cinecittà Studios in Rome. The film's sets were designed by the art director Giorgio Pinzauti.

== Synopsis ==
A young actor, frustrated by the negligible roles he keeps being cast in, plans a hoax. The play he is appearing in, involves his character being shot dead while hiding in a cupboard by an outraged husband. However, when the door is opened he has completely vanished forcing the management to return the audience's money. However, one of the spectators, a police officer had received an anonymous letter claiming that a murder was to take place at that theatre that night and begins an investigation.

== Cast ==
- Vivi Gioi as L'attrice
- María Mercader as L'attrice ingenua
- Stefano Sibaldi as L'attore
- Giulio Donadio as Il commissario de polizia
- Carlo Campanini as L'altro attore
- Lauro Gazzolo as L'impresario
- Bianca Della Corte as La figlia
- Maria Jacobini as La madre
- Virgilio Riento as Il trovarobe
- Arturo Bragaglia as Il suggeritore
- Carlo Lombardi as Il "grande" attore
- Manoel Roero as Il regista
- Valentina Cortese as Minor role

== Bibliography ==
- Curti, Roberto. Italian Giallo in Film and Television: A Critical History. McFarland, 2022.
- Moliterno, Gino. The A to Z of Italian Cinema. Scarecrow Press, 2009.
