= Nino Marchetti =

Italian actor

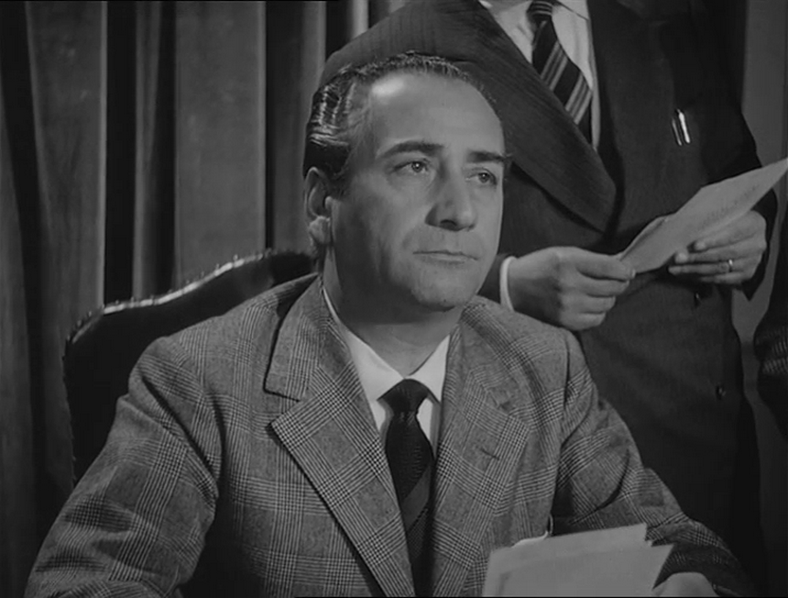
- Marchetti in Il viale della speranza (1953)
- Born: 21 February 1905; Codroipo, Friuli-Venezia Giulia, Italy
- Died: 19 February 1981 (aged 75); Rome, Lazio, Italy
- Occupation: Actor
- Years active: 1934–1973

Nino Marchetti (21 February 1905 – 19 February 1981) was an Italian film actor. He appeared in 66 films between 1934 and 1973.

== Selected filmography ==
- Melodramma (1934) – Remo
- Le scarpe al sole (1935) – Alpino amico di Toni i Cesco
- Lo squadrone bianco (1936) – Il sodato addetto segretario del capitano Santelia (uncredited)
- The Great Appeal (1936) – Il chirurgo
- Condottieri (1937) – Corrado
- Tonight at Eleven (1938) – Il direttore del cinema
- Ballerine (1938)
- Giuseppe Verdi (1938) – Un amico di verdi a Buseto
- Department Store (1939) – L'ispettore dell'inchiesta (uncredited)
- Dora Nelson (1939) – Il produttore
- Il ponte dei sospiri (1940)
- La granduchessa si diverte (1940)
- The Siege of the Alcazar (1940) – Fernando Ramirez
- Abandonment (1940)
- La danza dei milioni (1940) – Segretario di Walter
- Piccolo alpino (1940) – Rossi
- Non me lo dire! (1940) – L'impiegato del negozio
- The Daughter of the Green Pirate (1940) – Ramon
- Lucky Night (1941)
- Marco Visconti (1941)
- Piccolo mondo antico (1941) – Pedraglio, il cospiratore
- Light in the Darkness (1941) – L'impresario musicale
- Beatrice Cenci (1941) – Un contadino della Petrella
- The Black Panther (1942) – Gerard
- Mater dolorosa (1943)
- The Lovers (1946)
- The White Devil (1947) – Captain Peter
- Les Misérables (1948)
- Tempesta su Parigi (1948)
- Guarany (1948)
- Arrivederci, papà! (1948)
- The Emperor of Capri (1949) – Geremia
- Ring Around the Clock (1950) – Giulio
- L'inafferrabile 12 (1950)
- Song of Spring (1950)
- Anna (1951) – L'infermiere di guardia (uncredited)
- The Overcoat (1952)
- Toto and the King of Rome (1952) – Tavago
- Brothers of Italy (1952) – Il comandante Pullino
- La trappola di fuoco (1952) – The priest
- Il viale della speranza (1953) – Executive at 'Olmo Film'
- Riscatto (1953)
- The Pagans (1953) – Colonel Avilano
- The Treasure of Bengal (1953)
- Avanzi di galera (1954)
- The River Girl (1954) – Maresciallo dei carabinieri
- La campana di San Giusto (1954)
- Orphan of the Ghetto (1954)
- Foglio di via (1954)
- Le avventure di Cartouche (1955) – Tiranno
- Roland the Mighty (1955)
- Il prezzo della gloria (1956) – padre di Ruggero
- Fathers and Sons (1957) – Man at the Driving Lesson (uncredited)
- The Lady Doctor (1957) – (uncredited)
- Il cielo brucia (1958)
- Il romanzo di un giovane povero (1958)
- Big Deal on Madonna Street (1958) – Luigi
- Valeria ragazza poco seria (1958) – Poliziotto
- La sposa (1958) – Il medico
- Herod the Great (1959)
- Hercules Unchained (1959) – Fossore (uncredited)
- Prisoner of the Volga (1959) – Michailow
- Desert Desperados (1959) – Metullus
- La cento chilometri (1959) – Corsetti's Friend with a Dark Suit
- The Cossacks (1960) – Russian Officer
- Lipstick (1960) – Agente di polizia
- The Pharaohs' Woman (1960)
- The Bacchantes (1961) – Theban Citizen (uncredited)
- Blood Feud (1961)
- Gioventù di notte (1961) – Collega Padre di Marco
- The Centurion (1961)
- The Trojan Horse (1961)
- Le magnifiche 7 (1961)
- Toto vs. Maciste (1962) – Gran Dignitario
- A Queen for Caesar (1962) – Messaggero di Pompeius
- Queste pazze pazze donne (1964) – Customer from Bologna ('Siciliani a Milano")
- The Triumph of Hercules (1964) – Thieves' Victim
- Samson and His Mighty Challenge (1964)
- I due pericoli pubblici (1964) – Marshal (uncredited)
- Latin Lovers (1965) – Riccardo (segment "Il telefono consolatore")
- Spiaggia libera (1966)
- Sex Quartet (1965) – The Guest (segment "Fata Marta")
- Non Pensare a Me (1967)
- I criminali della metropoli (1967)
- God Will Forgive My Pistol (1969) – Clock Merchant
- I 2 magnifici fresconi (1969) – Customer from Bologna (uncredited)
- Reverend's Colt (1970) – Deputy Hop
- La ragazza del prete (1970)
- Un burattino di nome Pinocchio (1971) – The Police Officer (voice)
- Le mille e una notte... e un'altra ancora! (1973)
