= The White Devil (1947 film) =

1947 film directed by Nunzio Malasomma

- Directed by: Nunzio Malasomma
- Written by: Nunzio Malasomma
- Based on: Hadji Murat by Leo Tolstoy
- Produced by: Giulio Manenti
- Starring: Rossano Brazzi; Annette Bach; Roldano Lupi
- Cinematography: Rodolfo Lombardi
- Edited by: Gabriele Varriale
- Music by: Ezio Carabella
- Production company: Manenti Film
- Distributed by: Manenti Film; Francinex (France)
- Release date: 31 December 1947
- Running time: 100 minutes
- Country: Italy
- Language: Italian

The White Devil (Italian: Il diavolo bianco) is a 1947 Italian historical adventure film directed by Nunzio Malasomma and starring Rossano Brazzi, Annette Bach and Roldano Lupi. It is based on Leo Tolstoy's 1912 novella Hadji Murat. It was shot at the Scalera Studios in Rome. The film's sets were designed by the art director Arrigo Equini. It earned around 272 million lira at the Italian box office.

== Plot ==
In the Caucasus a rebel fighter battles against the rule of an oppressive Russian Governor, although he is in real life a prince who pretends to be a supporter of the Governor.

== Cast ==
- Rossano Brazzi as Prince André Mdwani - Il diavolo bianco
- Annette Bach as Countess Olga Kutezoff
- Roldano Lupi as Gov. Alexis Ignatieff
- Lea Padovani as Katiousha
- Harry Feist as Col. Stanikow
- Mario Ferrari as Prof. Ilya
- Armando Francioli as Wassili
- Vittorio Sanipoli as John
- Vittorina Benvenuti as Elena
- Angelo Calabrese as Michailoff
- Mario Gallina as Stoloff
- Cesare Lancia as Fiodor
- Nino Marchetti as Captain Peter

== Bibliography ==
- Chiti, Roberto; Poppi, Roberto; Lancia, Enrico (1991). Dizionario del cinema italiano: Dal 1945 al 1959 (in Italian). Gremese Editore. ISBN 978-88-7605-548-5.
- Goble, Alan, ed. (1999). The Complete Index to Literary Sources in Film. Bowker-Saur, Walter de Gruyter. ISBN 978-3-598-11492-2 – via Internet Archive.
