= The Anonymous Roylott =

1936 film

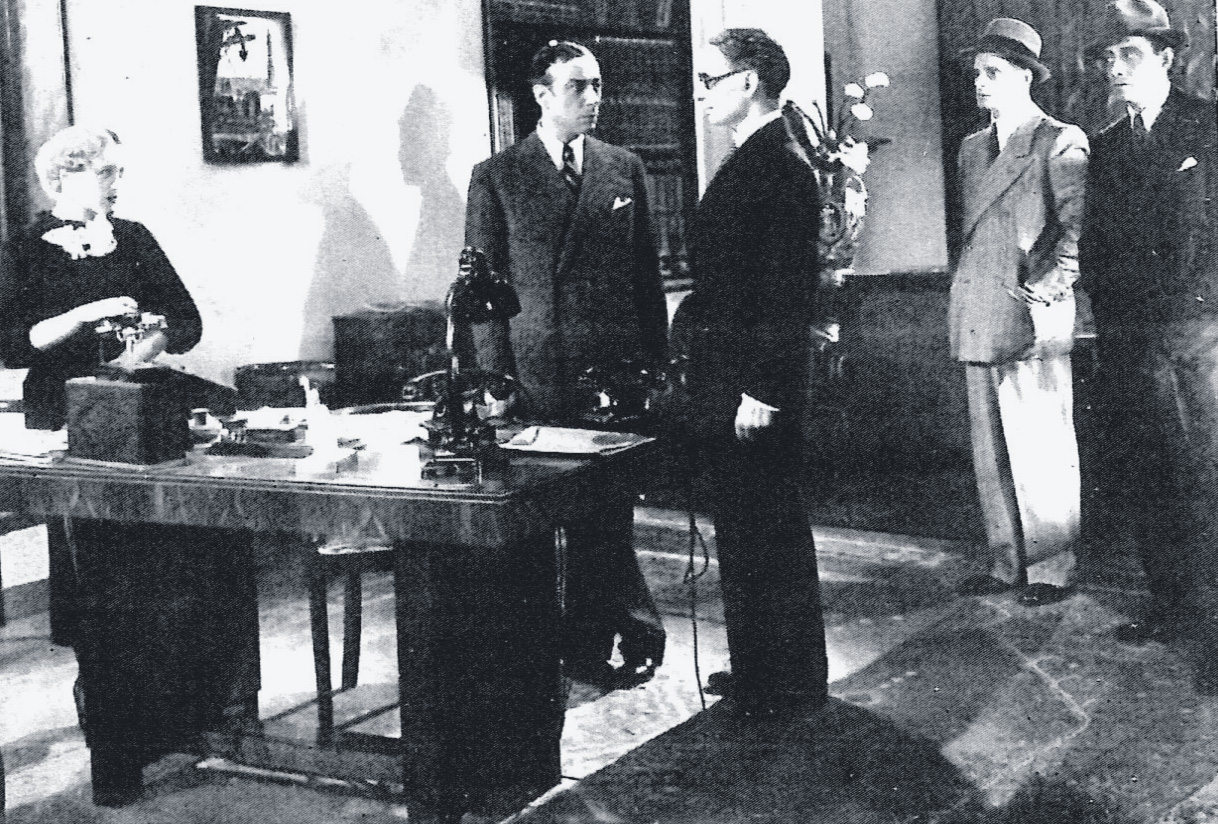
- Directed by: Raffaello Matarazzo
- Written by: Guglielmo Giannini (play)
- Starring: Camillo Pilotto; Isa Pola; Giulio Donadio
- Cinematography: Massimo Terzano
- Edited by: Raffaello Matarazzo
- Music by: Nuccio Fiorda
- Production company: Fiorda
- Distributed by: Warner Brothers
- Release date: 1936
- Running time: 72 minutes
- Country: Italy
- Language: Italian

The Anonymous Roylott (Italian: L'anonima Roylott) is a 1936 Italian thriller film directed by Raffaello Matarazzo and starring Camillo Pilotto, Isa Pola and Giulio Donadio. The film is an adaptation of a play set in the United States, about a murder that arises over a dispute at the Roylott chemical company.

It was shot at the Cines Studios in Rome. The film's sets were designed by the art director Antonio Tagliolini. It was distributed by the Italian branch of Warner Brothers.

== Cast ==
- Camillo Pilotto as Avvocato Giorgio Evans
- Italo Pirani as Joe Roylott
- Carlo Lombardi as Eric Roylott
- Giulio Donadio as Ingegner Rogers
- Romano Calò as MacKay, ispettore di polizia
- Isa Pola as Helena Roylott, nipote di Joe
- Mino Doro as Ing. Giorgo Harris, fidanzato di Helena
- Alfredo De Antoni as Peters, direttore amministrativo
- Emma Baron as Jean, moglie di Peters
- Olga Solbelli as Anna
- Giovanni Conforti as ingegner Dixon
- Paolo Stoppa as De Paoli, usciere
- Cesarina Gheraldi as Claire, segretaria dell'avv. Evans
- Mario Ferrari as Stark, capo della polizia
- Corrado Antonicelli as Morris, agente di polizia
- Beatrice Mancini as centralinista
- Aldo Pierantoni as avvocato
- Zoe Incrocci as dattilografa
- Norma Nova as dattilografa
- Clelia Bernacchi as impiegata
- Nietta Zocchi as segretaria

== Bibliography ==
- Aprà, Adriano. The Fabulous Thirties: Italian Cinema 1929-1944. Electa International, 1979.
