= The Former Mattia Pascal =

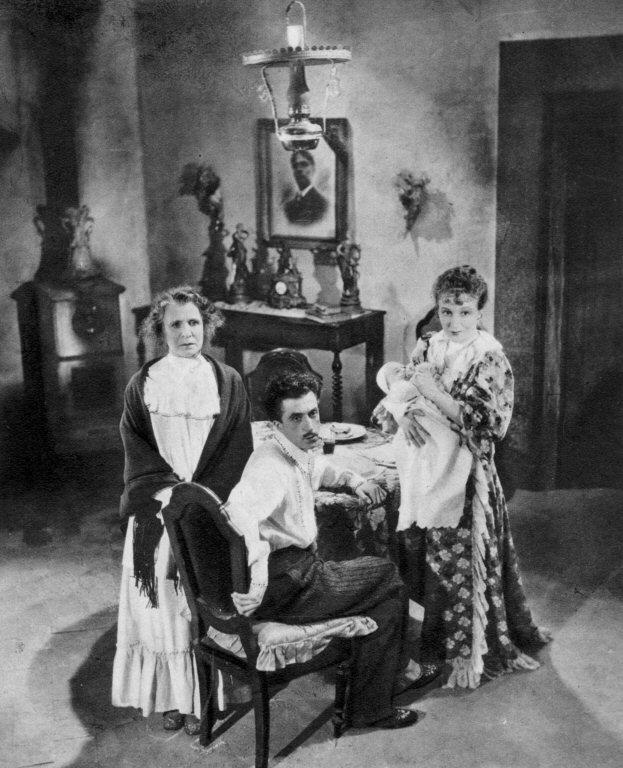
- Directed by: Pierre Chenal
- Written by: Pierre Chenal; Luigi Pirandello (story); Armand Salacrou; Christian Stengel
- Starring: Pierre Blanchar; Isa Miranda; Irma Gramatica
- Cinematography: Francesco Izzarelli
- Music by: Luigi Ferrari Trecate; Jacques Ibert
- Production companies: Ala Film; Colosseum Film
- Distributed by: Colosseum Film
- Release date: 8 April 1937
- Running time: 93 minutes
- Country: Italy
- Language: Italian

The Former Mattia Pascal (Italian: Il fu Mattia Pascal) is a 1937 Italian drama film directed by Pierre Chenal and starring Pierre Blanchar, Isa Miranda and Irma Gramatica. It is based on the 1904 novel Il fu Mattia Pascal by Luigi Pirandello. The film was shot at the Cines Studios in Rome. A separate French-language version was also made, under the title The Man from Nowhere.

The film's art direction was by Guido Fiorini.

== Cast ==
- Pierre Blanchar as Mattia Pascal
- Isa Miranda as Luisa Paleari
- Irma Gramatica as La vedova Pescatore
- Nella Maria Bonora as Romilda Pescatore Pascal
- Olga Solbelli as Silvia Caporale
- Enrico Glori as Il conte Papiano
- Adele Garavaglia as Angelica Bonafede Pascal
- Silvio Bagolini as Il portiere dell'hotel Luxor
- Pina Gallini as Zia Scolastica
- Luigi Pralavorio as Pomino
- Giuseppe Pierozzi as Il bibliotecario anziano
- Luigi Zerbinati as L'idiota della pensione
- Cesare Zoppetti as Paleari
- Alberto Angelini
- Guido Barbarisi
- Ornella Da Vasto
- Fernando De Crucciati
- Nino Eller
- Claudio Ermelli as Il becchino
- Enzo Gainotti
- Mario Gallina
- Luisa Garella
- Fausto Guerzoni as Un cameriere
- Rita Livesi
- Achille Majeroni
- Nicola Maldacea
- Cesare Polacco as Un ospite della pensione
- Giovanna Scotto
- Edda Soligo as Una signora al tavolo da giocco
- Gino Viotti

== Bibliography ==
- Landy, Marcia. Fascism in Film: The Italian Commercial Cinema, 1931-1943. Princeton University Press, 2014.
