= Tina Lattanzi =

Italian actress (1897–1997)

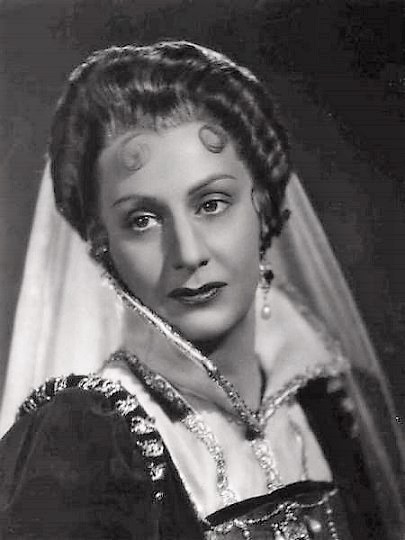
- Lattanzi in Beatrice Cenci (1941)
- Born: Annunziata Concetta Costantini; 5 December 1897; Licenza, Lazio, Kingdom of Italy
- Died: 25 October 1997 (aged 99); Milan, Lombardy, Italy
- Occupations: Actress; voice actress
- Years active: 1923–1988
- Spouse: Giovanni Lattanzi (m. 1919, separated)
- Partner(s): Guido Brignone (1930s–?)
- Children: 2

Annunziata Concetta "Tina" Lattanzi (née Costantini; 5 December 1897 – 25 October 1997) was an Italian actress and voice actress.

== Biography ==
A native of Licenza and the daughter of Ercole Costantini and Geltrude Montori, Lattanzi began her acting career in 1922 when she met Vittorio De Sica, who in turn, introduced her to Tatyana Pavlova, who coached her into acting. Lattanzi was mainly active on stage during the 1920s before making her screen debut in 1930 and she was well known for her portrayals of women of noble birth. In 1954, Lattanzi began focusing her attention on television. Because of her drawl, persuasive voice, she also turned to the Cooperativa Doppiatori Cinematografici during the 1940s.

As a prominent dubbing artist, Lattanzi performed the Italian voices of some of the major film icons of the 20th century such as Greta Garbo, Rita Hayworth, Marlene Dietrich, Joan Crawford, Greer Garson, Myrna Loy, Rosalind Russell, Martita Hunt, Agnes Moorehead, Tamara Lees and Italian actresses such as Franca Marzi. In her animated roles, Lattanzi typically dubbed the Italian voices of villains such as the Evil Queen in Snow White and the Seven Dwarfs, Lady Tremaine in Cinderella, the Queen of Hearts in Alice in Wonderland and Maleficent in Sleeping Beauty.

By the time Lattanzi reached her sixties, there had been a decline in her career, yet she was still active on television. She eventually retired after an eye infection.

=== Personal life ===
Lattanzi married Giovanni Lattanzi in 1919 and took his name. They had two children, Fiorella and Glauco. They later divorced because of her acting obligations and her later relationship with her collaborator Guido Brignone.

== Death ==
Lattanzi died in Milan on 25 October 1997, less than two months before her 100th birthday.

== Filmography ==
=== Cinema ===
- La straniera (1930) – La signora Clarkson
- The Charmer (1931) – La signora Marchi, moglie di Giovanni
- Pergolesi (1932) – Erminia
- Five to Nil (1932) – Moglie del Presidente
- Loyalty of Love (1934) – L'imperatrice Carolina
- Red Passport (1935) – Giulia Martini
- The Ambassador (1936)
- Ginevra degli Almieri (1936) – Violante
- The Count of Brechard (1938) – Queen Maria Antonietta
- Bayonet (1938)
- Una lampada alla finestra (1940)
- Incanto di mezzanotte (1940) – Dora White
- Big Shoes (1940) – Sofia Garlandi
- The Daughter of the Green Pirate (1940) – Governatrice
- Beatrice Cenci (1941) – Lucrezia Cenci
- I mariti (Tempesta d'anime) (1941) – La baronessa Rita d'Isola
- Disturbance (1942) – La contessa di Greve
- Document Z-3 (1942) – La Semenoff
- The Two Orphans (1942) – La contessa Diana di Linières
- La morte civile (1942) – Geltrude Castaldi
- Wedding Day (1942) – La direttrice del collegio (uncredited)
- The Gorgon (1942) – La contessa Matilde di Toscana
- Romanzo di un giovane povero (1942) – Elisabetta
- Nothing New Tonight (1942) – La principale dell'istituto
- Giacomo the Idealist (1943) – La contessa Cristina Magnenzio
- Principessina (1943) – La principessa
- La danza del fuoco (1943) – La baronessa d'Avita
- I'll Always Love You (1943) – La signora Clerici (uncredited)
- La storia di una capinera (1943) – La madrigna di Maria
- La carica degli eroi (1943)
- Resurrection (1944) – La principessa Korciaghin
- The Charterhouse of Parma (1948) – La princesse Marie-Louise de Bourbon-Parme (uncredited)
- Guarany (1948)
- Buried Alive (1949) – Elena
- Monaca santa (1949) – Anastasia Grifo
- Torment (1950) – Matilde Ferrari
- 47 morto che parla (1950) – La moglie dei sindaco
- The Ungrateful Heart (1951) – Elvira De Marchi
- Anna (1951) – La madre di Andrea
- Quattro rose rosse (1951)
- Deceit (1952) – Sig.ra Risasco, l'spettrice di polizia femminile
- Genoese Dragnet (1954) – Moglie del giudice Ranieri
- The Unfaithfuls (1953) – Carla Bellaris
- I Chose Love (1953)
- The Count of Saint Elmo (1953) – Donna Clelia
- Modern Virgin (1954) – Sig.ra Bardi
- Piccola santa (1954) – Contessa De Monte
- Presentimento (1956) – La marchesa Giuliana De Angelis
- The Love Specialist (1957) – Adelaide Serravezza di Montalcino
- La trovatella di Pompei (1957) – Guglielmo Curti's Mother
- Knight of 100 Faces (1960) – Ausonia
- Silver Spoon Set (1960) – Alberto De Matteis's Mother
- Minotaur, the Wild Beast of Crete (1960) – Queen Pasiphae
- Imperial Venus (1962)
- Catherine of Russia (1963) – Czarina Elizabeth
- The Leopard (1963)
- Orgasmo (1969) – Kathryn's Aunt
- The President of Borgorosso Football Club (1970) – Amelia Fornaciari
- Hospitals: The White Mafia (1973) – Vallotti's Mother
- The Sunday Woman (1975) – Massimo's Mother

== Voice work ==
Year	Title	Role	Notes
1953	Frine, Courtesan of Orient	La Morte	Voice-over
1956	I pinguini ci guardano		Voice-over

=== Dubbing ===
==== Films (Animation, Italian dub) ====
Year	Title	Role(s)	Ref
1938	Snow White and the Seven Dwarfs	The Evil Queen	
1950	Cinderella	Lady Tremaine	
1951	Alice in Wonderland	Queen of Hearts	
1955	Lady and the Tramp	Gilda	
1959	Sleeping Beauty	Maleficent	
