= Stefano Sibaldi =

Italian actor and voice actor (1905–1996)

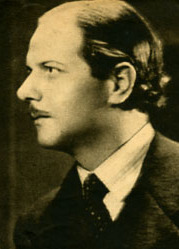
- Sibaldi in 1942
- Born: 11 June 1905; Livorno, Italy
- Died: 2 July 1996 (aged 91); Rome, Italy
- Occupations: Actor; voice actor
- Years active: 1928–1989

Stefano Sibaldi (11 June 1905 – 2 July 1996) was an Italian actor and voice actor.

== Biography ==
Born in Livorno, Sibaldi was considered to be among the most successful of the early actors and dubbers of the 20th century. He began his acting career in 1928 staying within the field of stage and screen and he worked alongside many related people within his ventures such as Carlo Veneziani and Armando Falconi. Sibaldi's film debut was in the 1934 film Full Speed and he also made radio and television acting contributions.

In 1937, Sibaldi entered a career as a voice dubber. Among the actors he dubbed included Frank Sinatra, Glenn Ford, Louis de Funès, Fred Astaire, Richard Widmark, Groucho Marx, Danny Kaye and many more. In his Italian dubbed animated roles, he voiced Timothy Q. Mouse in Dumbo, Captain Hook in Peter Pan, Tramp in Lady and the Tramp and the Cheshire Cat in Alice in Wonderland. Sibaldi retired from his career in the late 1980s.

== Death ==
Sibaldi died in Rome on July 2, 1996, at the age of 91.

== Filmography ==
=== Cinema ===
- Full Speed (1934)
- Sette giorni all'altro mondo (1936)
- Adam's Tree (1936)
- Pensaci, Giacomino! (1936)
- The Fornaretto of Venice (1939)
- Frenesia (1939)
- An Impossible Family (1940)
- Then We'll Get a Divorce (1940)
- Don Pasquale (1940)
- Il carnevale di Venezia (1940)
- Manovre d'amore (1941)
- Barbablù (1941)
- The Actor Who Disappeared (1941)
- La fuggitiva (1941)
- Il vagabondo (1941)
- Il pozzo dei miracoli (1941)
- Wedding Day (1942)
- Colpi di timone (1942)
- Sealed Lips (1942)
- L'amico delle donne (1943)
- Annabella's Adventure (1943)
- Il nemico (1943)
- Silenzio, si gira! (1943)
- 4 ragazze sognano (1943)
- La signora in nero (1943)
- Lascia cantare il cuore (1943)
- Mist on the Sea (1944)
- The Man with the Grey Glove (1948)
- Rascel-Fifì (1957)
- Il corazziere (1960)
- Mission Stardust (1967)

== Voice work ==
Year	Title	Role	Notes
1950	La Rosa di Bagdad	Genie of the Lamp	Animated film
1950	La Rosa di Bagdad	Narrator	Animated film

=== Dubbing ===
==== Films (Animation, Italian dub) ====
Year	Title	Role(s)	Ref
1939	Gulliver's Travels	King Little	
1946	Make Mine Music	Narrator #5	
1946	Peter and the Wolf	Narrator	
1948	Dumbo	Timothy Q. Mouse	
1948	The Three Caballeros	Professor Holloway	
1950	Cinderella	Grand Duke	
1950	Song of the South	Br'er Rabbit	
1951	Alice in Wonderland	Cheshire Cat	
1953	Peter Pan	Captain Hook	
1953	Peter Pan	Narrator	
1953	Ben and Me	Amos Mouse	
1955	Lady and the Tramp	Tramp	
