= The Adulteress (1946 film) =

1946 film directed by Duilio Coletti

- Film poster
- Directed by: Duilio Coletti
- Written by: Ugo Betti
- Based on: I padri etruschi play by Tullio Pinelli
- Produced by: Francesco Leoni
- Starring: Clara Calamai; Roldano Lupi; Carlo Ninchi; Delia Brandi
- Cinematography: Ubaldo Arata
- Edited by: Gabriele Varriale
- Music by: Enzo Masetti
- Production company: Grandi Film
- Distributed by: Artisti Associati
- Release date: 16 May 1946
- Running time: 107 minutes
- Country: Italy
- Language: Italian

The Adulteress (Italian: L'adultera) is a 1946 Italian melodrama film directed by Duilio Coletti and starring Clara Calamai, Roldano Lupi and Carlo Ninchi. It was shot at the Scalera Studios in Rome. Calamai received the Nastro d'Argento for Best Actress for her performance.

== Cast ==
- Clara Calamai as Velca
- Roldano Lupi as Tarquinio
- Carlo Ninchi as Dante Viburzi
- Delia Brandi as Quirina
- Dino Di Luca as Egidio Viburzi
- Carlo Romano as Il fattore
- Angelo Calabrese as Il padre di Velca
- Gualtiero Tumiati as Il vecchio indovino
- Ernesto Bianchi as Un contadino
- Bianca Avalise as Lucia
- Cesare Polacco as Il vecchio dei gioielli
- Eugenio Duse as Il compratore dei terreni
- Giovanni Onorato as Un contadino sul biroccio
- Luigi Garrone as Un ospite alla festa di battesimo
- Alfredo Martinelli as Un altro ospite alla festa di battesimo

== Production ==
The film can be ascribed to the strand of sentimental melodramas, commonly called tearjerkers (later renamed by critics as appendix neorealism), then very much in vogue among Italian audiences.

It was made at the Scalera Film plants in Rome.

Because of the film's theme, adultery (then considered a crime against morality in Italy), it was heavily censored, with several scenes being cut.

== Plot ==
An ambitious peasant woman agrees to marry a very rich but crude and elderly landowner. In the process she leaves her fiancé who skips town. The marriage is not happy and after a few years the husband reproaches the woman for not having given him a child as he threatens to disinherit her in case of his death. Meanwhile, her ex-boyfriend returns to town and an incurable passion ignites between the two that leads to adultery. A son is soon born from the illicit relationship and the husband, unaware of the affair, announces great celebrations. But the young man does not want to adapt to the fiction and demands that she and the child run away with him. Faced with her refusal, she reveals the truth to her husband who savagely kills her lover in revenge. Obsessed with remorse, the woman goes crazy.

== Bibliography ==
- Moliterno, Gino. Historical Dictionary of Italian Cinema. Scarecrow Press, 2008.
