= Evi Maltagliati =

Italian actress (1908–1986)

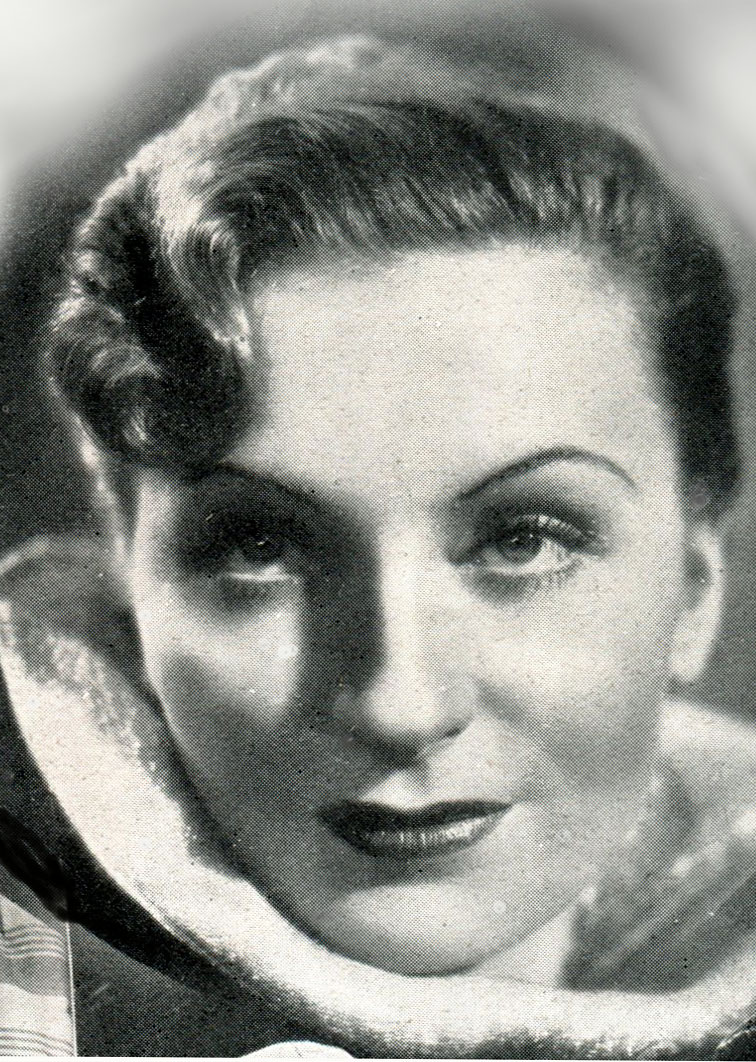
- Maltagliati in 1935
- Born: Evelina Maltagliati; 11 August 1908; Florence, Kingdom of Italy
- Died: 27 April 1986 (aged 77); Rome, Italy
- Occupation: Actress

Evi Maltagliati (11 August 1908 – 27 April 1986) was an Italian stage, television and film actress.

== Life and career ==
Born in Florence as Evelina Maltagliati, she started her career at debuted in the theater just 15 years old, in the Galli-Guasti stage company. Her critical consecration came in 1933 with the role of Titania in a Max Reinhardt's representation of William Shakespeare's A Midsummer Night's Dream staged in Boboli.

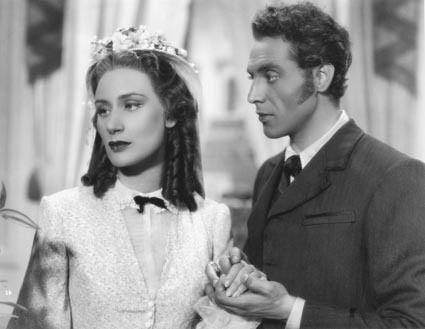
Maltagliati with Roldano Lupi in Yes, Madam (1942)

She later worked on stage with Eduardo De Filippo, Gino Cervi, Vittorio Gassman, Nino Manfredi, Sergio Tofano among others. While she had few opportunities in films, she was very active on television, in TV dramas and series. Maltagliati was married to comedian Eugenio Cappabianca.

== Partial filmography ==
- La fanciulla dell'altro mondo (1934)
- Aldebaran (1935) – Anna Weiss
- The Two Sergeants (1936) – Marilyne Gould
- Jeanne Doré (1938) – Fanny
- Inventiamo l'amore (1938) – Anna
- I, His Father (1939) – Eva
- Il piccolo re (1939) – Lucia
- The Silent Partner (1939) – La diva
- Scandalo per bene (1940) – Bianca Alviano
- The Betrothed (1941) – La monaca di Monza detta "La Signora"
- Yes, Madam (1942) – La signora Valdata
- Il nemico (1943) – Silvia Harle
- Monte Miracolo (1945) – Gianna Fortis
- Fire Over the Sea (1947) – Dory Jane
- Daniele Cortis (1947) – Isa
- Buried Alive (1949) – Elisa
- La voce del sangue (1952)
- Noi peccatori (1953) – La madre di Lucia
- I Vinti (1953) – Claudio's mother
- Ulysses (1954) – Ulysses' Mother
- Ultima illusione (1954)
- A Woman Alone (1956) – Pressenda
- Adorabili e bugiarde (1958) – Suzy / Suzanne the Costume Designer
- Sergente d'ispezione (1958)
- The Adventures of Nicholas Nickleby (1958, TV series) – Signora Nickleby
- Il padrone delle ferriere (1959) – Marchesa di Beaulieu
- Il peccato degli anni verdi (1960) – Paolo Donati's Mother
- Madri pericolose (1960) – La contessa Alessandra Improta
- Suleiman the Conqueror (1961) – Anna, la Governante
- La tragica notte di Assisi (1961) – Ortolana
- La monaca di Monza (1962) – Badessa Inbeserco
- Le scorpion (1962)
- Imperial Venus (1962) – Madame Adelaide
- Fire Over Rome (1965) – Livia Augusta, Marcus's Mother
- The Strange Night (1967)
- The Head of the Family (1967) – Luisa
- Giacomo Casanova: Childhood and Adolescence (1969) – Serpieri
- Catch-22 (1970) – Old Woman
- Roma Bene (1971) – La madre di Elena
- This Kind of Love (1972) – madre di Federico
- The Dominici Affair (1973) – Marie Dominici
