= The Flight in the Night =

1926 film directed by Amleto Palermi

- Directed by: Amleto Palermi
- Written by: Luigi Pirandello (play); Alfred Schirokauer; Curt Wesse; Amleto Palermi
- Produced by: Heinrich Nebenzahl
- Starring: Conrad Veidt; Robert Scholz; Angelo Ferrari; Paul Biensfeldt
- Cinematography: Curt Courant; Arpad Viragh
- Production company: Nero Film
- Distributed by: Domo-Strauß-Film
- Release date: 13 December 1926
- Country: Germany
- Languages: Silent; German intertitles

The Flight in the Night (German: Die Flucht in die Nacht) is a 1926 German silent drama film directed by Amleto Palermi and starring Conrad Veidt, Robert Scholz and Angelo Ferrari. It was based on the play Henry IV by Luigi Pirandello. The art direction was by Hermann Warm. It was shot on location in Tuscany in Italy.

== Cast ==
- Conrad Veidt as Heinrich IV
- Angelo Ferrari as Graf di Nolli
- Robert Scholz as Baron Belcredi, Schurke
- Paul Biensfeldt as Diener
- Oreste Bilancia as Raso
- Agnes Esterhazy as ältliche Matrone
- Enrica Fantis as Maria
- Carl Geppert as Bediensteter
- John Gottowt as Bediensteter
- Georg John as Bediensteter
- Hermann Vallentin as Irrenarzt, Prof. Genoni
- Hertha von Walther

== Bibliography ==
- Bock, Hans-Michael & Bergfelder, Tim. The Concise CineGraph. Encyclopedia of German Cinema. Berghahn Books, 2009.
- Soister, John T.; Battle, Pat Wilks (2002). Conrad Veidt on Screen: A Comprehensive Illustrated Filmography. Jefferson, N.C.: McFarland. ISBN 978-0786412891.
