= The Old Lady =

1932 film

- Directed by: Amleto Palermi
- Written by: Amleto Palermi; Orsino Orsini
- Starring: Emma Gramatica; Maurizio D'Ancora; Armando Falconi
- Cinematography: Giovanni Vitrotti
- Edited by: Amleto Palermi
- Music by: Umberto Mancini
- Production company: Caesar Film
- Distributed by: Caesar Film
- Release date: 26 February 1932
- Running time: 97 minutes
- Country: Italy
- Language: Italian

The Old Lady (Italian: La vecchia signora) is a 1932 Italian comedy drama film directed by Amleto Palermi and starring Emma Gramatica, Maurizio D'Ancora and Armando Falconi. It also features Vittorio De Sica in his first sound film. The film's sets were designed by the art director Redo Romagnoli.

== Synopsis ==
Maria, an elderly but impoverished aristocrat, works as a roasted chestnut vendor in order to maintain a pretend show of wealth for her niece whose education she is supporting.

== Cast ==
- Emma Gramatica as Maria
- Nella Maria Bonora as Bianchina
- Maurizio D'Ancora as Fausto
- Armando Falconi as Zaganello
- Memo Benassi as Lenticcio
- Vittorio De Sica as Il fine dicitore
- Anna Maria Dossena as Bianca La Nipotina
- Camillo Pilotto as Il commissario
- Ugo Ceseri as Il padre di Fausto
- Umberto Sacripante as Un cliente dell'osteria dal Cordaro
- Lydia Simoneschi

== Bibliography ==
- Katz, Ephraim. The Film Encyclopedia. Crowell, 1979.
