= Lo sconosciuto di San Marino =

- Directed by: Michał Waszyński
- Written by: Cesare Zavattini; Vittorio Cottafavi; Giulio Morelli
- Starring: Anna Magnani; Vittorio De Sica; Antonio Gandusio
- Cinematography: Arturo Gallea
- Edited by: Mario Serandrei
- Music by: Alessandro Cicognini
- Production company: Film Gamma
- Distributed by: Generalcine
- Release date: 29 October 1946
- Running time: 85 minutes
- Country: Italy
- Language: Italian
- Box office: 71 million Lira

Lo sconosciuto di San Marino ("The Unknown Man of San Marino") is a 1946 Italian drama film directed by Michał Waszyński and starring Anna Magnani, Vittorio De Sica and Antonio Gandusio.

It was shot at the Icet Studios in Milan and on location around the Republic of San Marino where it is set. The screenwriter Cesare Zavattini and the actors Anna Magnani and Vittorio De Sica were key figures in the neorealist movement which was at its height when the film was made.

== Synopsis ==
During the closing stages of the Second World War, refugees pour into San Marino. One of them is a foreigner who has apparently lost his memory. Liana, a prostitute, is very sympathetic towards him. He also bonds with members of the Polish Army he encounters. However, during a religious procession to mark the fall of the German Gothic Line, he is jolted by the memory of an atrocity he committed while serving with German forces against a similar procession. Filled with remorse, he commits suicide by walking into a minefield.

== Cast ==
- Anna Magnani as Liana, la prostituta
- Vittorio De Sica as Leo, l'ateo
- Aurel Milloss as Lo sconosciuto
- Antonio Gandusio as Don Antonio, il prete
- Renata Bogdanska as Wanda
- Irma Gramatica as Agata
- Franca Belli as Beatrice
- Giuseppe Porelli as Filippo, l'autista
- Fausto Guerzoni as Marino
- Aristide Garbini as il cerimoniere
- Enrico Maria Salerno as MP Wolf

== Bibliography ==
- Chiti, Roberto & Poppi, Roberto. Dizionario del cinema italiano: Dal 1945 al 1959. Gremese Editore, 1991.
- Sieglohr, Ulrike. Heroines Without Heroes: Reconstructing Female and National Identities in European Cinema, 1945–51. Bloomsbury Publishing, 2016.
