= Annette Bach =

German actress

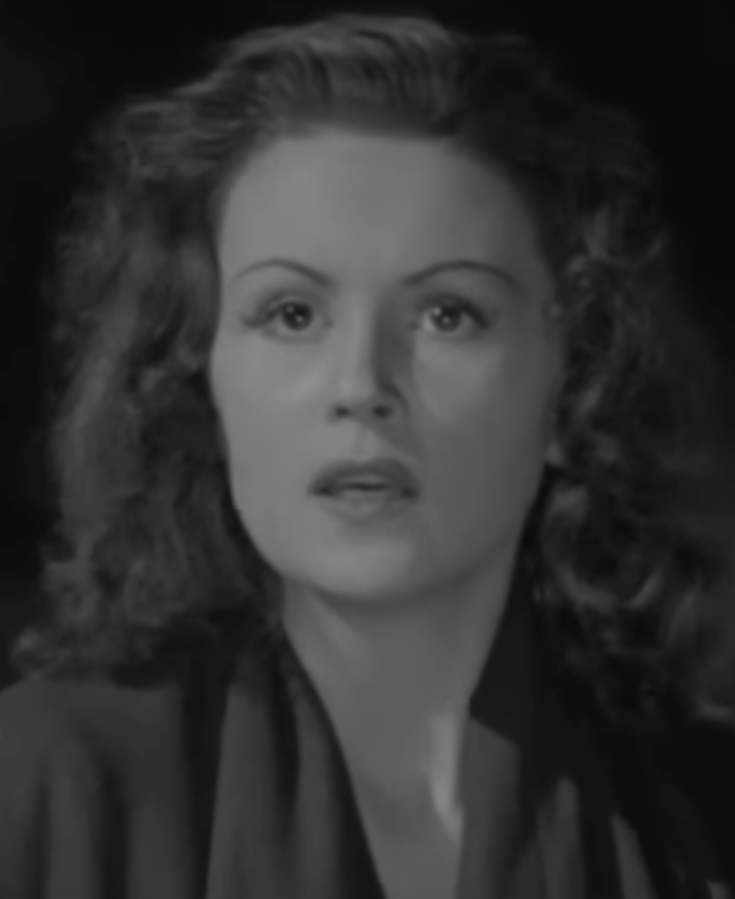
- Bach in the 1942 Italian film, Il mercante di schiave
- Born: Hamburg, Germany
- Occupation: Actress
- Years active: 1940–1950 (film)

Annette Bach was a German film actress noted for her roles in Italian productions during and after the Second World War. She played the female lead in a number of films. Born in Hamburg she studied acting in Berlin before moving to Italy in 1941, at the time the two countries were wartime Allies.

== Selected filmography ==
- Jud Suss (1940)
- Il mercante di schiave (1942)
- Sealed Lips (1942)
- Tutta la vita in ventiquattr'ore (1943)
- The Lovers (1946)
- The White Devil (1947)
- The Man with the Grey Glove (1948)
- Duello senza onore (1950)

== Bibliography ==
- Goble, Alan. The Complete Index to Literary Sources in Film. Walter de Gruyter, 1999.
- Lancia, Enrico & Melelli, Fabio. Le straniere del nostro cinema. Gremese Editore, 2005.
- Mosconi, Elena. L'impressione del film: contributi per una storia culturale del cinema italiano, 1895-1945. Vita e Pensiero, 2006.
