= Beatrice Cenci (1941 film) =

1941 film

- Directed by: Guido Brignone
- Written by: Tomaso Smith
- Produced by: Giulio Manenti
- Starring: Carola Höhn; Giulio Donadio; Tina Lattanzi
- Cinematography: Jan Stallich
- Edited by: Vincenzo Zampi
- Music by: Alberto Ghislanzoni
- Production company: Manenti Film
- Distributed by: Manenti Film
- Release date: 9 September 1941
- Running time: 80 minutes
- Country: Italy
- Language: Italian

Beatrice Cenci is a 1941 Italian historical drama film directed by Guido Brignone and starring Carola Höhn, Giulio Donadio and Tina Lattanzi. It is one of several films portraying the story of the sixteenth century Italian noblewoman Beatrice Cenci.

The film's sets were designed by the art director Guido Fiorini. The costume design was by Gino Sensani.

== Cast ==
- Carola Höhn as Beatrice Cenci
- Giulio Donadio as Francesco Cenci
- Tina Lattanzi as Lucrezia Cenci
- Osvaldo Valenti as Giacomo Cenci
- Elli Parvo as Angela
- Enzo Fiermonte as Olimpio Calvetti
- Sandro Ruffini as Il giudice Moscato
- Luigi Pavese as Catalano
- Marcello Giorda as Il presidente del tribunale
- Arturo Bragaglia as Don Lorenzo
- Iginia Armilli
- Franco Cuppini
- Aulo D'Anzio as Il segretario del giudice
- Giovanni Dal Cortivo as Il brigante nella grotta
- Gualtiero De Angelis as Curzio
- Angelo Dessy
- Carlo Duse as Il capitano dei gendarmi
- Pina Gallini as La governante di Don Lorenzo
- Marino Girolami
- Gina Graziosi
- Nino Marchesini as Il castellano dei Colonna
- Nino Marchetti as Un contadino della Petrella
- Giovanni Onorato
- Mario Ortensi
- Roberto Pasetti as L'usuraio
- Emilio Petacci as Farinacci
- Gina Ror
- Aris Valeri

== Bibliography ==
- Waters, Sandra. Narrating the Italian Historical Novel. ProQuest, 2009.
