= Story of a Poor Young Man =

Story of a Poor Young Man (Spanish:La novela de un joven pobre) may refer to:

- Story of a Poor Young Man (1942 film), an Argentine film directed by Luis Bayón Herrera
- Story of a Poor Young Man (1968 film), an Argentine film directed by Enrique Cahen Salaberry
- The Story of a Poor Young Man (1920 film), a 1920 Italian silent drama film
