= Leonardo Cortese =

Italian actor (1916–1984)

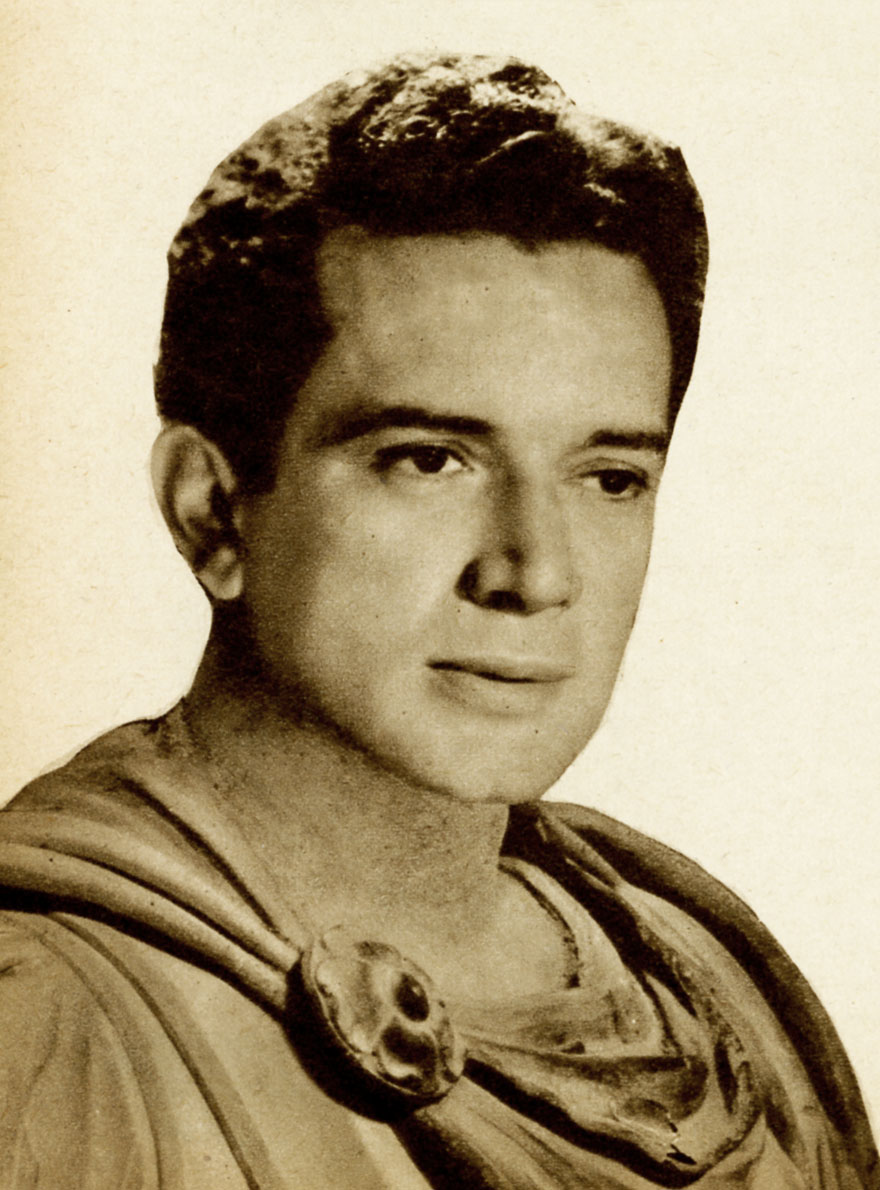
- Born: 24 May 1916; Rome, Italy
- Died: 31 October 1984 (aged 68); Rome, Italy
- Occupations: Actor; Film director
- Years active: 1938-1967

Leonardo Cortese (24 May 1916 – 31 October 1984) was an Italian film actor and director. He appeared in more than 30 films between 1938 and 1962. He also directed eight films between 1952 and 1967. He was born and died in Rome, Italy.

== Selected filmography ==
- The Widow (1939)
- Father For a Night (1939)
- A Romantic Adventure (1940)
- First Love (1941)
- The Queen of Navarre (1942)
- Happy Days (1942)
- Yes, Madam (1942)
- A Garibaldian in the Convent (1942)
- The Three Pilots (1942)
- Farewell Love! (1943)
- The Devil Goes to Boarding School (1944)
- The Ways of Sin (1946)
- Cab Number 13 (1948)
- The Flame That Will Not Die (1949)
- A Night of Fame (1949)
- Feathers in the Wind (1950)
- Song of Spring (1951)
- The Captain of Venice (1951)
- Article 519, Penal Code (1952)
- The Valiant (1962)

== Miniseries ==
- Romeo e Giulietta dir. Franco Enriquez (1954), as Mercuzio
- L'armadietto cinese (1956)
- Il club dei suicidi (1957), from Robert Louis Stevenson.
- Così per gioco as director (1979)
