= Inspector Vargas =

1940 film

- Spanish poster
- Directed by: Gianni Franciolini
- Written by: Gianni Franciolini; Pier Luigi Melani; Vincenzo Tieri (play)
- Starring: Giulio Donadio; Olga Solbelli; Mariella Lotti
- Cinematography: Renato Del Frate
- Edited by: Angelo L. Comitti
- Music by: Costantino Ferri
- Production companies: Sovrania Film; Industrie Cinematografiche Artistiche Romane; CIFESA
- Distributed by: Generalcine (Italy)
- Release date: 14 October 1940
- Countries: Italy; Spain
- Language: Italian

Inspector Vargas (Italian: L'ispettore Vargas, Spanish: El inspector Vargas) is a 1940 Italian-Spanish crime film directed by Gianni Franciolini and Félix Aguilera and starring Giulio Donadio, Olga Solbelli and Mariella Lotti. It was made at Cinecittà in Rome, and released in separate Italian and Spanish versions. The film's sets were designed by the art director Salvo D'Angelo.

== Cast ==
- Giulio Donadio as Ispettore Vargas
- Olga Solbelli as Signora Douwe, sua ex moglie
- Mariella Lotti as Irene, sua figlia
- Lauro Gazzolo as Dedè, il landrucolo
- Checco Rissone as Roulis
- Luis Hurtado as L'industriale Donald
- Massimo Serato
- Maria Dominiani
- Miguel del Castillo
- Armando Migliari
- Lina Bacci
- Bella Starace Sainati
- Fernando Aguirre
- Armando Calvo
- Juan Calvo
- Nicolás D. Perchicot
- Carlo Mariotti
- Gianni Lorenzon
- Silvana Jerussi
- Armando Furlai
- Anna Canonico

== Bibliography ==
- Matilde Hochkofler. Anna Magnani. Gremese Editore, 2001.
