= Yes, Madam (1942 film) =

1942 film

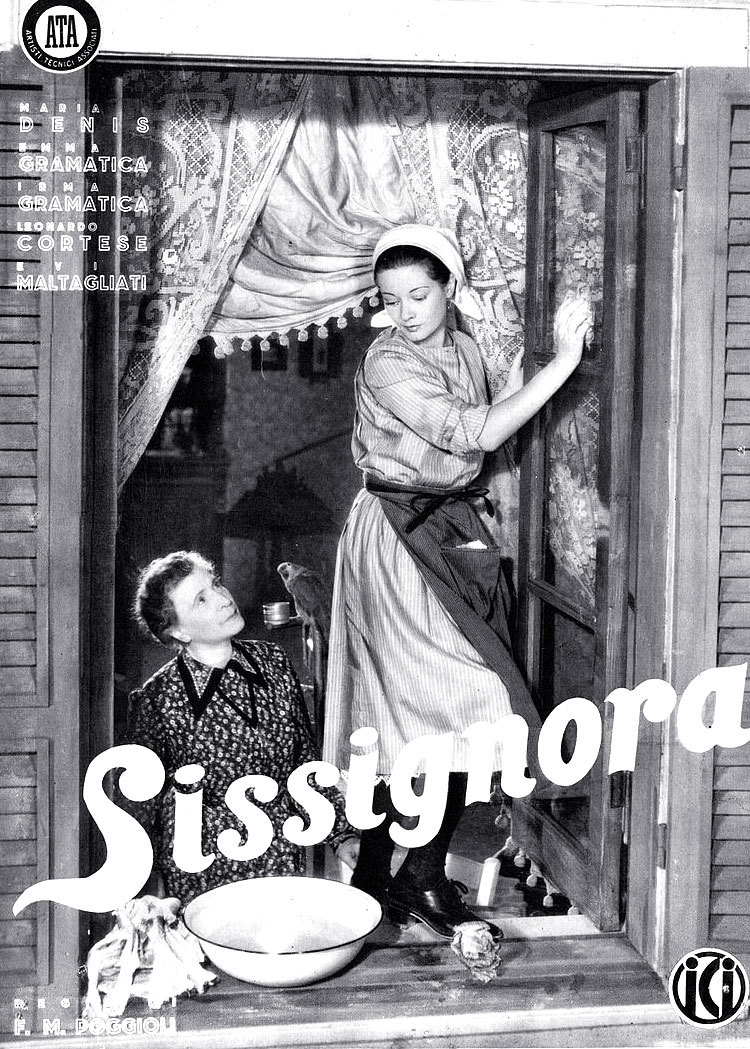
- Directed by: Ferdinando Maria Poggioli
- Written by: Anna Banti; Emilio Cecchi; Bruno Fallaci; Alberto Lattuada; Ferdinando Maria Poggioli
- Starring: María Denis; Leonardo Cortese; Emma Gramatica; Irma Gramatica
- Cinematography: Carlo Montuori
- Edited by: Ferdinando Maria Poggioli
- Music by: Felice Lattuada
- Production company: Artisti Tecnici Associati
- Distributed by: ICI
- Release date: 20 February 1942
- Running time: 94 minutes
- Country: Italy
- Language: Italian

Yes, Madam (Italian: Sissignora) is a 1942 Italian romance film directed by Ferdinando Maria Poggioli and starring María Denis, Leonardo Cortese and Emma Gramatica. It was shot at the Cinecittà Studios in Rome. The films sets were designed by the art director Fulvio Jacchia.

== Cast ==
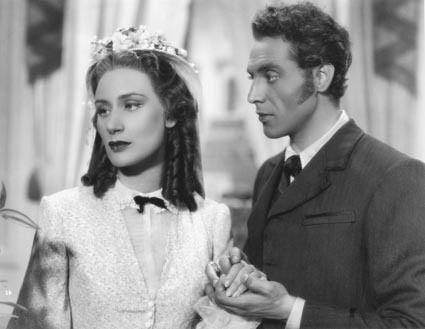
Evi Maltagliati and Roldano Lupi in a scene from the film.

- María Denis as Cristina Zunino
- Leonardo Cortese as Vittorio
- Emma Gramatica as Lucia Robbiano
- Irma Gramatica as Anna Robbiano
- Rina Morelli as Suor Valeria
- Evi Maltagliati as La signora Valdata
- Silverio Pisu as Il piccolo Giorgetto Valdata
- Roldano Lupi as L'amante de la signora Valdata
- Dhia Cristiani as Paolina Gatti
- Jone Salinas as Enrichetta
- Elio Marcuzzo as Emilio
- Guido Notari as Pescatori, Il medico
- Anna Carena as La suora caposala
- Giovanni Grasso as Il commendator Bracco-Rinaldi
- Dina Perbellini as Signora Bracco-Rinaldi
- Dora Bini as Signorina Bracco-Rinaldi
- Federico Collino as Il maggiordomo
- Anna Capodaglio
- Elio Dalilla
- Stelvio Rosi
- Giulio Vezza
- Raffaele Vezza

== Bibliography ==
- Reich, Jacqueline & Garofalo, Piero. Re-viewing Fascism: Italian Cinema, 1922-1943. Indiana University Press, 2002.
