= The Count of Saint Elmo =

1950 film

- Directed by: Guido Brignone
- Written by: Aldo De Benedetti; Vittorio Nino Novarese; Guido Brignone
- Produced by: Mario Bisi; Leopoldo Imperiali; Alberto Giacalone; Ignazio Luceri
- Starring: Massimo Serato; Anna Maria Ferrero; Tino Buazzelli
- Cinematography: Augusto Tiezzi
- Edited by: Jolanda Benvenuti
- Music by: Armando Fragna
- Production company: Itala Film
- Distributed by: Itala Film
- Release date: 1950
- Running time: 92 minutes
- Country: Italy
- Language: Italian

The Count of Saint Elmo (Italian: Il Conte di Sant'Elmo) is a 1950 historical adventure film directed by Guido Brignone and starring Massimo Serato, Anna Maria Ferrero and Tino Buazzelli. It was shot at the Farnesina Studios of Titanus in Rome. The film's sets were designed by the art director Ottavio Scotti.

== Plot ==
On the way to perform at the opera in Naples, a famous singer is accosted by an outlaw leader who then proceeds to let her go with robbing anything. Later she believes she recognises the man as the Count of Sant'Elmo, although he indignantly denies this. She later discovers that he is in fact the leader of band of Carbonari fighting for Italian unification, battling the local chief of police Baron Cassano.

== Cast ==
- Massimo Serato as Count of Sant'Elmo
- Anna Maria Ferrero as Laura Cassano
- Tino Buazzelli as Baron Annibale Cassano
- Nelly Corradi as Bianca Barbieri
- Tina Lattanzi as Donna Clelia
- Carlo Croccolo as Alberico
- Alfredo Varelli as Don Paolo
- Pier Luigi Costantini as Forino
- Renato Malavasi as Anselmo
- Luigi Pavese as Security Officer
- Filippo Scelzo as Mancini
- Franco Pesce

== Bibliography ==
- Chiti, Roberto & Poppi, Roberto. Dizionario del cinema italiano: Dal 1945 al 1959. Gremese Editore, 1991.
