= Peccato di castità =

1956 film by Gianni Franciolini

- Directed by: Gianni Franciolini
- Written by: Sergio Amidei; Age & Scarpelli
- Starring: Giovanna Ralli
- Cinematography: Anchise Brizzi
- Music by: Carlo Rustichelli
- Release date: 1956
- Country: Italy
- Language: Italian

Peccato di castità (Italian for "Sin against chastity") is a 1956 Italian comedy film directed by Gianni Franciolini.

== Plot ==
Adventures of a young married couple during their honeymoon trip. Because of a promise, Valentina has to resort to any trick to prevent the husband to consummate the marriage. The reality is that the woman, terrified by the suffocating climate existing since the time of their engagement between the families of the couple, made in secret to herself this vote.

== Cast ==
- Giovanna Ralli: Valentina Colasanti
- Antonio Cifariello: Michele Colasanti
- Franco Fabrizi: Peppino Maggi
- Mara Werlen: Claretta
- Alberto Talegalli: Carlo, Valentina's father
- Aldo Giuffrè: Vittorio Ricci
- Toni Ucci: A young husband at the hotel
- Ciccio Barbi: Hotel porter
- Corrado Olmi: Hotel manager
- Giacomo Furia: Employer of Alitalia
- Enzo Garinei: Employer of Alitalia
- Miranda Campa: Aunt
