= Gianni Franciolini =

Italian film director

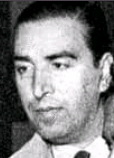
- Franciolini in 1951
- Born: 1 June 1910; Florence, Italy
- Died: 1 January 1960 (aged 49); Rome, Italy
- Occupations: Film director, screenwriter
- Years active: 1939-1959

Gianni Franciolini (1 June 1910 – 1 January 1960) was an Italian film director and screenwriter. He directed 19 films between 1939 and 1959.

== Life and career ==
Born in Florence, in 1929 he moved to Paris to study journalism; there he came into contact with the artistic avant-garde of the time, particularly with Eugène Deslaw. During this time, he was assistant director of Georges Lacombe and directed the documentary Vérité sur l'Italie. In 1938, he came back in Italy country where he collaborated as a screenwriter and as an assistant director for Camillo Mastrocinque and Mario Soldati, among others. In 1940 he debuted as a feature film director with Inspector Vargas. In the post-war, Franciolini specialised in neo-realist comedies and genre films, often collaborating with Cesare Zavattini. In 1956 he won the David di Donatello Award for Best Director, for the comedy-drama film Roman Tales.

== Filmography ==
- Vérité sur l'Italie (1939)
- L'ispettore Vargas (1940)
- Happy Days (1942)
- Headlights in the Fog (1942)
- Farewell Love! (1943)
- Notte di tempesta (1946)
- Prelude to Madness (1948)
- The Bride Can't Wait (1949)
- Last Meeting (1951)
- Hello Elephant (1952)
- It Happened in the Park (1953)
- We, the Women (1953)
- The World Condemns Them (1953)
- Secrets d'alcôve (1954)
- Roman Tales (1955)
- Le signorine dello 04 (1955)
- Peccato di castità (1956)
- Girls for the Summer (1958)
- Ferdinando I, re di Napoli (1959)
