= Anna Capodaglio =

Italian actress (1879–1961)

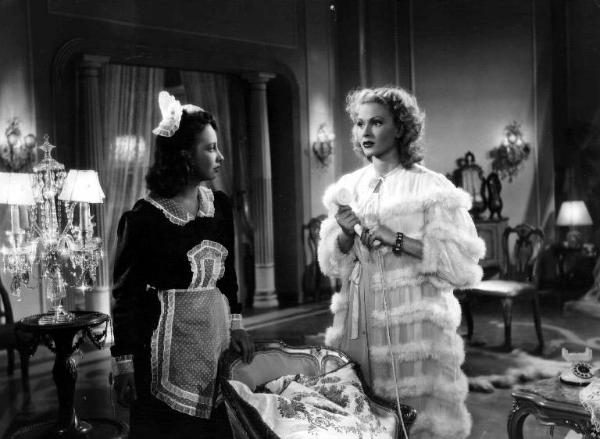
- The Stolen Song - Anna Capodaglio Vivi Gioi
- Born: Anna Adele Alberta Gramatica; 19 September 1879; Messina, Italy
- Died: 29 June 1961 (aged 81); Bologna, Italy
- Occupation: Actress
- Years active: 1936–1945
- Spouse: Ruggero Capodaglio
- Relatives: Emma Gramatica (sister); Irma Gramatica (sister); Wanda Capodaglio (sister-in-law)

Anna Capodaglio (pseudonym of Anna Adele Alberta Gramatica; 19 September 1879 – 29 June 1961) was an Italian actress. She appeared in more than twenty films from 1936 to 1945. Her sisters Emma Gramatica and Irma Gramatica were both actresses. The actress Wanda Capodaglio was her sister-in-law (the sister of her husband Ruggero Capodaglio).

== Selected filmography ==
Year	Title	Role	Notes
1936	La Damigella di Bard		
1939	The Widow	Rosa	
1941	Yes, Madam		
1941	Schoolgirl Diary		
1942	A Pistol Shot		
1944	The Priest's Hat		
1944	The Devil Goes to Boarding School		
1945	No Turning Back		
