= Sealed Lips (1942 film) =

1942 film

- Italian theatrical release poster
- Directed by: Mario Mattoli
- Written by: Leo Catozzo; Mario Mattoli; Aldo De Benedetti; Marcello Marchesi; Stefano Vanzina
- Produced by: Giulio Manenti
- Starring: Fosco Giachetti; Annette Bach; Andrea Checchi; Vera Carmi
- Cinematography: Anchise Brizzi
- Edited by: Fernando Tropea
- Music by: Ezio Carabella
- Production company: Manenti Film
- Distributed by: Nazionalcine
- Release date: 13 November 1942
- Running time: 80 minutes
- Country: Italy
- Language: Italian

Sealed Lips (Italian: Labbra serrate) is a 1942 Italian mystery thriller film directed by Mario Mattoli and starring Fosco Giachetti, Annette Bach, Andrea Checchi and Vera Carmi. It was shot at Cinecittà Studios in Rome. The film's sets were designed by the art directors Piero Filippone and Mario Rappini.

== Synopsis ==
A young man from a respectable background loses his head over a woman with a past. His friend, a lawyer, attempts to split the couple up and soon afterwards her murdered body is discovered.

== Cast ==
- Fosco Giachetti as Ruggero D'Anzi
- Annette Bach as La contessa Lydia Lamsky
- Andrea Checchi as Carlo Massani
- Vera Carmi as Anna Massani
- Giulio Donadio as Il giudice Massani
- Carlo Campanini as Camillo Pardini
- Tino Scotti as Francesco Ugoletti
- Armida Bonocore as Laura Croci / Antonietta Marradi
- Nino Pavese as Il direttore del carcere
- Armando Migliari as Il commissario
- Gina Cinquini as Rosina
- Nino Eller as Il presidente del tribunale
- Amalia Pellegrini as La domestica di D'Anzi
- Peppino Spadaro as L'aiutante avvocato difensore
- Guido Verdiani as Il portinaio
- Giulio Panicali as Un amico di Pardini
- Stefano Sibaldi as Un amico di Pardini
- Loris Gizzi as L'avvocato difensore di Carlo

== Bibliography ==
- Curti, Roberto. Italian Giallo in Film and Television: A Critical History. McFarland, 2022.
