= Fausto Guerzoni =

Italian film actor

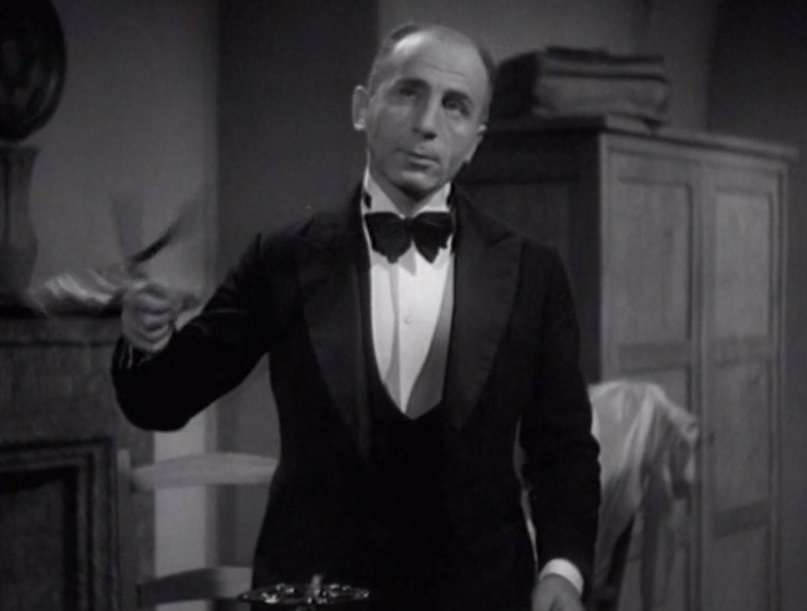
- Screenshot from the film A Husband for the Month of April (1941)
- Born: 13 January 1904; Nonantola, Emilia-Romagna, Kingdom of Italy
- Died: 1 June 1967 (aged 63); Rome, Italy
- Occupation: Actor
- Years active: 1935–1968 (film & TV)

Fausto Guerzoni (1904–1967) was an Italian actor. A character actor, he appeared in Italian films in supporting roles from the mid-1930s.

== Selected filmography ==
- I'll Give a Million (1935) - (uncredited)
- Ballerine (1936) - Prandi
- Cavalry (1936) - Other Attendant
- The Former Mattia Pascal (1937) - Un cameriere
- Bertoldo, Bertoldino e Cacasenno (1937) - Bertoldino
- All of Life in One Night (1938) - Tramontana
- The Black Corsair (1938)
- Under the Southern Cross (1938) - Coppola
- Star of the Sea (1938)
- Crispino e la comare (1938)
- A Thousand Lire a Month (1939) - Leopoldo Almos
- Diamonds (1939) - Sguerza, il capo tipografo
- Pretty or Plain They All Get Married (1939)
- Bionda sotto chiave (1939)
- Il ladro (1939) - Tony Scalza
- Backstage (1939) - Il vice commissario
- Cose dell'altro mondo (1939) - L'ubriaco all "Trappola d'Oro"
- Troppo tardi t'ho conosciuta (1940) - Annibale, il suggeritore
- The Thrill of the Skies (1940) - Fausto
- Don Pasquale (1940) - Remigio
- La canzone rubata (1940) - Primo giornalista
- Idyll in Budapest (1941)
- Lucky Night (1941)
- A Husband for the Month of April (1941) - Pietro, il domestico del marchese
- Il signore a doppio petto (1941)
- The King of England Will Not Pay (1941)
- La compagnia della teppa (1941) - Il notaio Ippolito Agudio
- Il cavaliere senza nome (1941)
- The King's Jester (1941) - Il primo zingaro
- Broken Love (1942) - L'autista di Riccardi
- A Garibaldian in the Convent (1942) - Tiepolo, Il guardiano del convento
- Gioco pericoloso (1942) - Lo stalliere
- Angelo del crepuscolo (1942) - Pacotto
- Il nemico (1943) - Marco Dolfus, il poliziotto
- Incontri di notte (1943) - Il custode
- Short Circuit (1943) - Il secondo giocatore di scacchi
- Gli assi della risata (1943) - Marquis Bonacci (segment "Il mio pallone") / Bus passenger (segment "Turno di riposo")
- L'abito nero da sposa (1945) - Beppe, il campanaro
- La casa senza tempo (1945) - Il portiere
- The Great Dawn (1947) - Fausto
- Unknown Man of San Marino (1948) - Marino - the sacristan
- L'isola di Montecristo (1948) - Marciano
- Bicycle Thieves (1948) - Amateur Actor
- Eleven Men and a Ball (1948) - Massaggiatore
- The Monastery of Santa Chiara (1949) - Un pensionante
- His Last Twelve Hours (1950) - Un operaio
- Mamma Mia, What an Impression! (1951) - Il venditore del presepio
- Tragic Spell (1951) - Girasole
- Revenge of Black Eagle (1951) - Pastore testimone
- Hello Elephant (1952) - Un inquilino
- Rome 11:00 (1952)
- Frontier Wolf (1952) - Falconiere
- Cronaca di un delitto (1953) - Oreste
- Easy Years (1953) - Fascista raffredato
- Bread, Love and Dreams (1953) - Uomo col cannocchiale
- Terra straniera (1954)
- The Country of the Campanelli (1954) - Rataplan
- Altura (1954) - Napoleone
- Bread, Love and Jealousy (1954) - Uomo col cannocchiale
- Assi alla ribalta (1954) - Altro detective
- Scandal in Sorrento (1955) - Uomo col cannocchiale
- Il prezzo della gloria (1956) - padre Efisio (uncredited)
- Oh! Sabella (1957) - The Chemist Vincenzo
- Pirate of the Half Moon (1957) - Mastro Anselmo
- Non cantare... baciami! (1957)
- Ladro lui, ladra lei (1958) - Tipografo (uncredited)
- Anna of Brooklyn (1958)
- Pia de' Tolomei (1958)
- Black Orpheus (1959) - Fausto
- La nipote Sabella (1959) - The Doctor Vincenzo
- The Magistrate (1959) - The Usher at Insurance Office (uncredited)
- The Night of the Great Attack (1959) - The Monk (uncredited)
- Le sorprese dell'amore (1959) - Ruggero (uncredited)
- Ferdinando I, re di Napoli (1959) - The Coachman of Pat and Cordelia (uncredited)
- The Traffic Policeman (1960) - The Judge (uncredited)
- Gioventù di notte (1961) - Venditore giocattoli
- Follie d'estate (1963) - Vecchietto arzillo

== Bibliography ==
- Bianca Freire-Medeiros. Touring Poverty. Routledge, 2014.
