= Red Passport =

1935 film

- Directed by: Guido Brignone
- Written by: Fritz Eckardt; Gian Gaspare Napolitano; Ivo Perilli; Tomaso Smith
- Produced by: Alfredo Guarini
- Starring: Isa Miranda; Filippo Scelzo; Ugo Ceseri; Giulio Donadio
- Cinematography: Ubaldo Arata
- Edited by: Giuseppe Fatigati
- Music by: Emilio Gragnani
- Production company: Tirrenia Film
- Distributed by: ENIC
- Release date: August 1935
- Running time: 90 minutes
- Country: Italy
- Language: Italian

Red Passport (Italian: Passaporto rosso) is a 1935 Italian historical drama film directed by Guido Brignone and starring Isa Miranda, Filippo Scelzo and Ugo Ceseri. A group of Italian immigrants to South America join in a revolution.

It was shot at the Cines Studios in Rome and on location at Sabaudia in Lazio. The film's sets were designed by the art director Guido Fiorini.

The Italian dictator Benito Mussolini watched the film, and ordered some scenes to be altered as he felt the film was providing an example of revolutionary techniques to potential enemies of his Fascist regime.

== Partial cast ==
- Isa Miranda as Maria Brunetti
- Filippo Scelzo as Lorenzo Casati
- Ugo Ceseri as Antonio Spinelli
- Giulio Donadio as Don Pancho Rivera
- Tina Lattanzi as Giulia Martini
- Federico Collino as Luigi Martini
- Olga Pescatori as Manuela Martini
- Mario Pisu as Gianni Casati
- Oreste Fares as Andrea Brunetti
- Mario Ferrari as Don Pablo Ramirez
- Carlo Ninchi as Un passeggero sul 'Santa Fe'
- Flavio Díaz as Il capitano del 'Santa Fe'
- Guglielmo Barnabò as Mr. Johnson
- Cele Abba as actress at the 'Café de Paris'

== Bibliography ==
- Gundle, Stephen. Mussolini's Dream Factory: Film Stardom in Fascist Italy. Berghahn Books, 2013.
