= The Man with the Grey Glove =

1948 film directed by Camillo Mastrocinque

- Directed by: Camillo Mastrocinque
- Written by: Camillo Mastrocinque; Vittorio Nino Novarese; Fulvio Palmieri
- Produced by: Giulio Manenti
- Starring: Annette Bach; Roldano Lupi; Antonio Centa
- Cinematography: Gábor Pogány
- Edited by: Eraldo Da Roma
- Music by: Ezio Carabella
- Production company: Manenti Film
- Distributed by: Manenti Film; Francinex (France)
- Release date: 11 November 1948
- Running time: 102 minutes
- Country: Italy
- Language: Italian

The Man with the Grey Glove (Italian: L'uomo dal guanto grigio) is a 1948 Italian mystery crime film directed by Camillo Mastrocinque and starring Annette Bach, Roldano Lupi and Antonio Centa. Cinematographer Gábor Pogány used a number of camera shots to give the production the feel of a film noir. The film's sets were designed by the art director Ottavio Scotti. It earned around sixty five million lire at the box office.

== Synopsis ==
Set in the art world, a forgery of a famous painting leads on to a series of murders. The chief suspect in the case Anna, a young artist, and her friend Silvio decide to take on the investigation themselves to unmask the real culprit.

== Cast ==
- Annette Bach as Anna Gaddi
- Roldano Lupi as Claudio Drago
- Antonio Centa as Max
- Mario Del Monaco as Silvio Martini
- Eros Belloni as Il direttore radio
- Leo Garavaglia as Il medico legale
- Lauro Gazzolo as Il critico d'arte
- Renato Malavasi as Il ministro
- Armando Migliari as Il commissario P.S.
- Zora Piazza as La ballerina
- Pina Piovani as Amalia
- Sandro Ruffini as L'ispettore Pasquini
- Agostino Salvietti as Il custode del museo
- Filippo Scelzo as Tambroni
- Stefano Sibaldi as L'intendente belle arti
- Gualtiero Tumiati as Il pittore Masero
- Gaetano Verna as L'altro intendente

== Bibliography ==
- Chiti, Roberto & Poppi, Roberto. Dizionario del cinema italiano: Dal 1945 al 1959. Gremese Editore, 1991.
- Curti, Roberto. Italian Giallo in Film and Television: A Critical History. McFarland, 2022.
