= The Widow (1939 film) =

1939 film by Goffredo Alessandrini

- Directed by: Goffredo Alessandrini
- Written by: Renato Simoni (play); Tomaso Smith; Goffredo Alessandrini
- Starring: Isa Pola; Leonardo Cortese; Osvaldo Valenti; Ruggero Ruggeri
- Cinematography: Ubaldo Arata
- Edited by: Giorgio Simonelli
- Music by: Giorgio Federico Ghedini
- Production company: Scalera Film
- Distributed by: Scalera Film
- Release date: 9 February 1939
- Running time: 93 minutes
- Country: Italy
- Language: Italian

The Widow (Italian: La vedova) is a 1939 Italian drama film directed by Goffredo Alessandrini and starring Isa Pola, Leonardo Cortese and Osvaldo Valenti. A mother's possessive love for her dead son leads to a hostile attitude towards his widow.

== Main cast ==
- Isa Pola as Maddalena
- Leonardo Cortese as Carlo
- Osvaldo Valenti as Padova, il pittore
- Ruggero Ruggeri as Alessandro
- Emma Gramatica as Adelaide, moglie di Alessandro
- Cesco Baseggio as Anselmo
- Nicola Maldacea as Gennarino
- Cesare Zoppetti as Ogniben
- Bice Parisi as Donna Clementina
- Emi Rai as Gemma
- Anna Capodaglio as Rosa
- Vasco Creti as Il medico
- Albino Principe as Mario

== Bibliography ==
- Reich, Jacqueline & Garofalo, Piero. Re-viewing Fascism: Italian Cinema, 1922-1943. Indiana University Press, 2002.
