= Ezio Carabella =

Italian composer

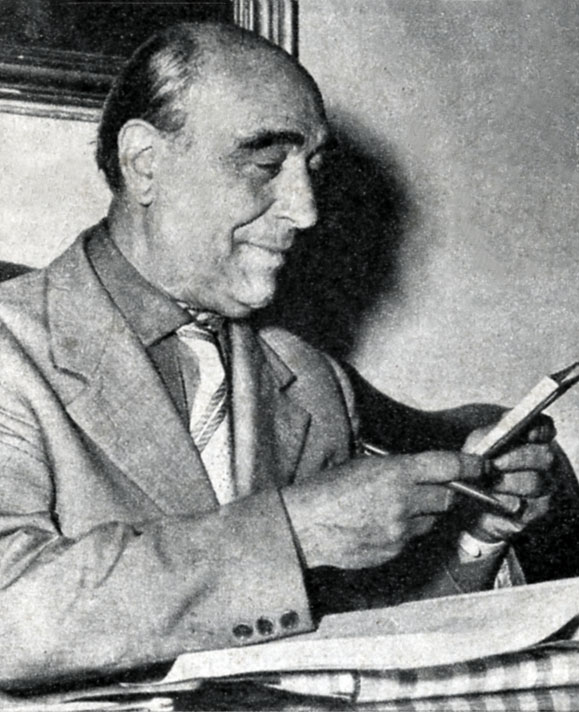
Ezio Carabella in 1955

Ezio Carabella (3 March 1891 in Rome – 19 April 1964 in Rome) was an Italian operetta, song and film music composer. He provided music for several films directed by Mario Camerini, among others. He was the father of the actress Flora Carabella.

== Selected filmography ==
- Lowered Sails (1931)
- The Last Adventure (1932)
- I'll Always Love You (1933)
- Fanny (1933)
- Like the Leaves (1935)
- The Phantom Gondola (1936)
- King of Diamonds (1936)
- Mad Animals (1939)
- It Always Ends That Way (1939)
- Then We'll Get a Divorce (1940)
- The Last Dance (1941)
- Sealed Lips (1942)
- The Princess of Dreams (1942)
- Two Hearts Among the Beasts (1943)
- Two Suffer Better Than One (1943)
- I'll Always Love You (1943)
- Short Circuit (1943)
- The Son of the Red Corsair (1943)
- Life Begins Anew (1945)
- The Ten Commandments (1945)
- The Opium Den (1947)
- The White Devil (1947)
- Baron Carlo Mazza (1948)
- The Man with the Grey Glove (1948)
- Four Red Roses (1951)
- Son of the Hunchback (1952)
- Loving You Is My Sin (1953)
- The King's Prisoner (1954)
- The Mysteries of Paris (1957)
