= Naples of Olden Times =

- Directed by: Amleto Palermi
- Written by: Amleto Palermi
- Produced by: Carlo Barbieri
- Starring: Vittorio De Sica; Emma Gramatica; Elisa Cegani; María Denis
- Cinematography: Anchise Brizzi
- Edited by: Fernando Tropea
- Music by: Alessandro Cicognini
- Production company: Astra Film
- Distributed by: Generalcine
- Release date: 1938
- Running time: 85 minutes
- Country: Italy
- Language: Italian

Naples of Olden Times (Italian: Napoli d'altri tempi) is a 1938 Italian musical comedy film directed by Amleto Palermi and starring Vittorio De Sica, Emma Gramatica and Elisa Cegani. It was made at Cinecittà in Rome.

== Synopsis ==
At the beginning of the Twentieth century, a young employee of a Naples shop dreams of becoming a famous singer.

== Cast ==
- Vittorio De Sica as Mario Esposito
- Emma Gramatica as Maddalena Errante
- Elisa Cegani as Maria
- María Denis as Ninetta
- Olga Vittoria Gentilli as Zia Bettina
- Giuseppe Porelli as Barracchi
- Enrico Glori as Maurizio
- Gianni Altieri as De Stasio
- Vittorio Bianchi as Il marchese Leopoldo Piermarini
- Nicola Maldacea as Nicola
- Agostino Salvietti as Luigino
- Guglielmo Sinaz as L'impiegato di Casa Ricordi

== Bibliography ==
- Gundle, Stephen. Mussolini's Dream Factory: Film Stardom in Fascist Italy. Berghahn Books, 2013.
- Liehm, Mira. Passion and Defiance: Film in Italy from 1942 to the Present. University of California Press, 1984.
