= La Damigella di Bard =

- Directed by: Mario Mattoli
- Written by: Salvator Gotta (play), Mario Mattoli (screenplay)
- Starring: Emma Gramatica; Mirella Pardi; Amelia Chellini
- Production company: I.C.I.
- Release date: 1936
- Running time: 75 minutes
- Country: Italy
- Language: Italian

La Damigella di Bard (alternative title Il Destino) is a 1936 Italian drama film directed by Mario Mattoli.

== Cast ==
- Emma Gramatica as Maria Clotilde di Bard
- Luigi Cimara as Il marchese Luciano di Pombia
- Carlo Tamberlani as Ferdinandi di Bard
- Cesare Bettarini as Franco Toscani
- Amelia Chellini as Signora Ponzetti
- Luigi Pavese as Avv. Palmieri
- Achille Majeroni as Il padre di Maria (as Achile Majeroni)
- Olga Pescatori as Denise
- Mirella Pardi as Renata
- Armando Migliari as Amilcare Pacotti
- Vasco Creti as Papa Ponzetti
- Romolo Costa as Il conte Amedeo
- Rina Valli as Orsolina
- Mario Brizzolari as L'ufficiale giudiziario
- Eugenio Duse as Filippo Carli
