= Emma Gramatica =

Italian actress (1874–1965)

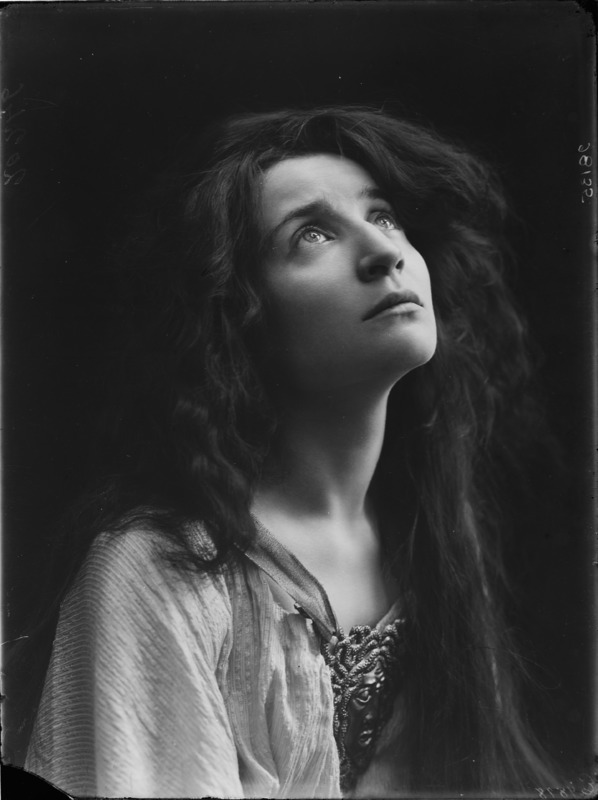
- Gramatica in 1903
- Born: Aida Laura Argia Gramatica; 25 October 1874; Fidenza, Parma, Italy
- Died: 8 November 1965 (aged 91); Ostia, Italy
- Occupation: Actress
- Years active: 1894–1962
- Relatives: Irma Gramatica (sister); Anna Capodaglio (sister)

Emma Gramatica (born Aida Laura Argia Gramatica; 25 October 1874 – 8 November 1965) was an Italian stage and film actress. She appeared in 29 films between 1919 and 1962. She was born in Borgo San Donnino, today Fidenza, province of Parma and died in Ostia. Her sisters Irma and Anna were also actresses.

== Filmography ==
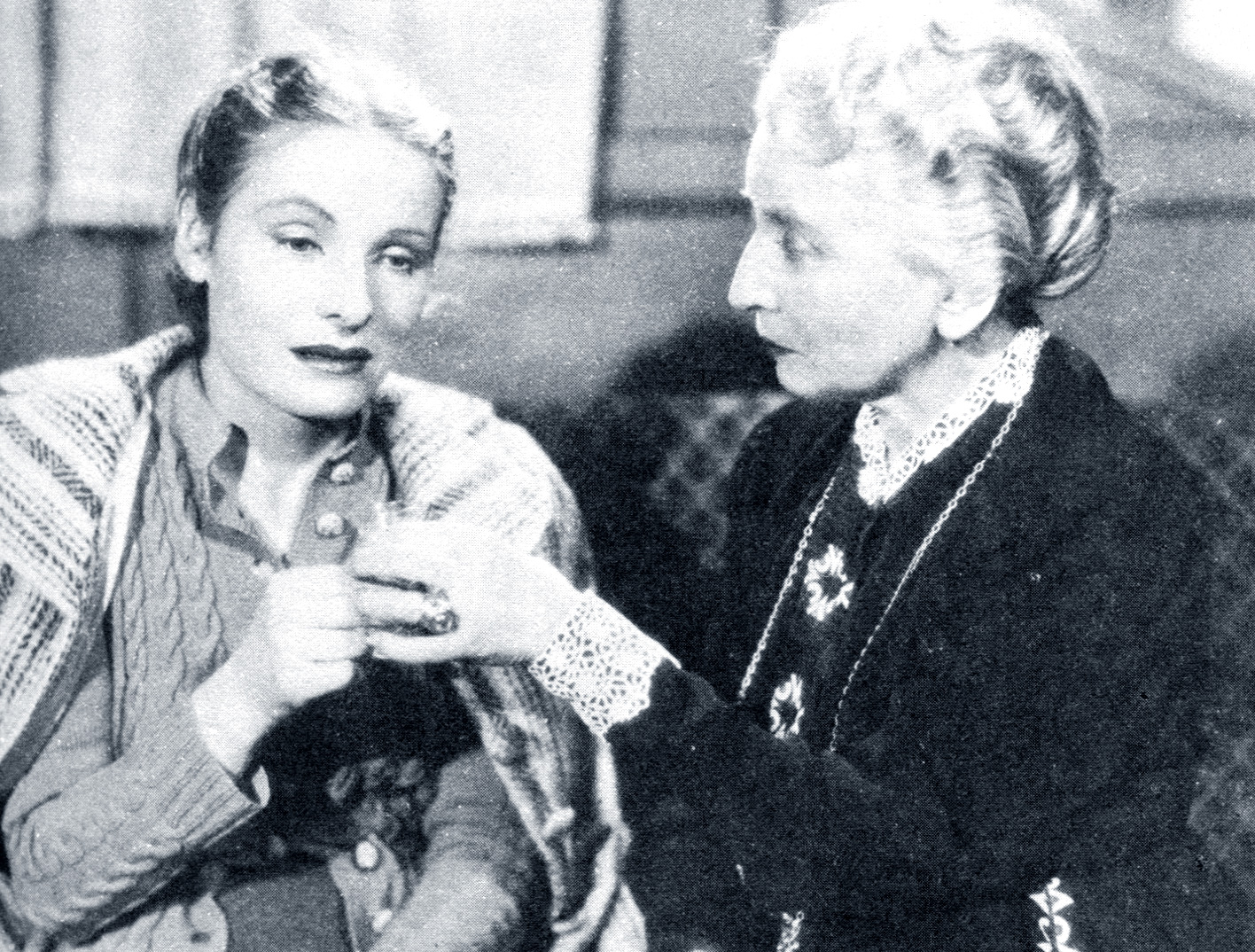
Bianca Doria and Emma Gramatica in Piccolo hotel (1939)

Year	Title	Role	Notes
1916	Quando il canto si spegne		
1932	The Old Lady	La signora Maria	
1933	La fortuna di zanze	Zanze	
1937	Marcella	La baronessa Contuni	
1938	Naples of Olden Times	Maddalena Errante	
1938	Destiny	Damigella di Bard	
1938	Jeanne Doré	Jeanne Doré	
1938	La Damigella di Bard	Maria Clotilde di Bard	
1939	The Widow	Adelaide, moglie di Alessandro	
1939	Piccolo hotel	Marta Toth	
1941	Mamma	Matilde Sarni, madre di Mario	
1942	Yes, Madam	Lucia Robbiano	
1942	Vertigine	Letizia, sua sorella	
1943	The White Angel	La marchesa Anastasia Carani	
1944	The Materassi Sisters	Carolina Materassi	
1945	L'angelo del miracolo		
1946	Voglio bene soltanto a te	Elvira, madre di Enzo	
1948	My Poor Beloved Mother		
1951	Mi vida por la tuya	Emma Alberti	
1951	Miracle in Milan	La vecchia Lolotta	
1954	Peppino e la vecchia signora	signora Ricciardi	
1956	Le Secret de sœur Angèle	Soeur Thérèse	
1956	I giorni più belli	La maestra Assunta Giannelli	
1961	Don Camillo: Monsignor	Desolina, la vecchia	
1962	La monaca di Monza	Badessa Anziana	
1962	Il mio amico Benito	Madre di Giuseppe	
