= Irma Gramatica =

Italian actress (1870–1962)

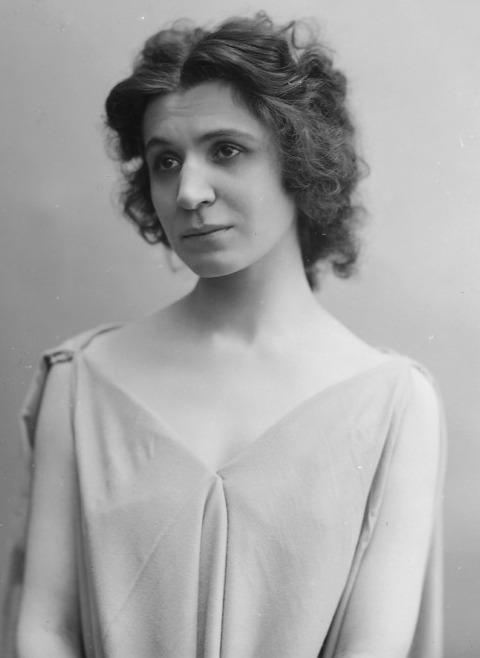
- Born: Maria Francesca Gramatica; 25 November 1870; Fiume, Austro-Hungarian Empire
- Died: 24 October 1962 (aged 91); Tavarnuzze, Impruneta, Italy
- Occupation: Actress
- Years active: 1934–1951 (film)
- Relatives: Emma Gramatica (sister); Anna Capodaglio (sister)

Irma Gramatica (born Maria Francesca Gramatica; 25 November 1870 – 24 October 1962) was an Italian stage and film actress. Gramatica appeared in ten films during her career including The Materassi Sisters (1944). Her sisters Anna Capodaglio and Emma Gramatica were both actresses.

== Selected filmography ==
- Port (1934)
- The Former Mattia Pascal (1937)
- Yes, Madam (1942)
- The Materassi Sisters (1944)
- Unknown Men of San Marino (1946)
- Tragic Spell (1951)

== Bibliography ==
- Landy, Marcia. The Folklore of Consensus: Theatricality in the Italian Cinema, 1930–1943. SUNY Press, 1998.
