= List of Italian films of 1954 =

A list of films produced in Italy in 1954 (see 1954 in film):

== A-B ==
Title	Director	Cast	Genre	Notes
1954
Acque amare	Sergio Corbucci	Milly Vitale, Piero Lulli, John Kitzmiller	Drama	
Ah! Les belles bacchantes	Jean Loubignac	Robert Dhéry, Louis de Funès	Comedy	
The Air of Paris	Marcel Carné	Jean Gabin, Roland Lesaffre, Arletty	Drama	Co-production with France
Alvaro piuttosto corsaro	Camillo Mastrocinque	Renato Rascel, Tina De Mola	Comedy	
An American in Rome	Steno	Alberto Sordi, Maria-Pia Casilio, Giulio Calì, Ilse Peterson, Leopoldo Trieste	Comedy	
Amore e smarrimento	Filippo Walter Ratti	Flora Lillo, Piero Palermini, Loris Gizzi	Drama	
Angela	Dennis O'Keefe	Dennis O'Keefe, Mara Lane, Rossano Brazzi	Crime thriller	Co-production with US
Angels of Darkness	Giuseppe Amato	Linda Darnell, Valentina Cortese, Lea Padovani	Melodrama	
Appassionatamente	Giacomo Gentilomo	Amedeo Nazzari, Myriam Bru	Melodrama	
The Art of Getting Along	Luigi Zampa	Alberto Sordi, Marco Guglielmi, Luisa Della Noce	Comedy	
Assi alla ribalta	Ferdinando Baldi, Giorgoio Cristallini	Marco Tulli, Fausto Guerzoni	Musical comedy	
Attila	Pietro Francisci	Anthony Quinn, Sophia Loren, Henri Vidal, Irene Papas,	Sword and sandal	
Avanzi di galera	Vittorio Cottafavi	Richard Basehart, Eddie Constantine, Antonella Lualdi	Drama	
Baracca e burattini	Sergio Corbucci	Carlo Dapporto, Lauretta Masiero, Narciso Parigi	Musical comedy	
Barrier of the Law	Piero Costa	Rossano Brazzi, Lea Padovani, Maria Frau	Crime	
The Beach	Alberto Lattuada	Martine Carol, Raf Vallone, Carlo Romano	Comedy drama	Co-production with France
The Beautiful Otero	Richard Pottier	María Félix, Jacques Berthier	Drama	Co-production with France
The Bed	Henri Decoin, Jean Delannoy	Vittorio De Sica, Jeanne Moreau, Richard Todd, Dawn Addams	Comedy drama	Co-production with France
Before the Deluge	André Cayatte	Antoine Balpêtré, Paul Bisciglia, Marina Vlady	Drama	Co-production with Italy
Bertoldo, Bertoldino and Cascacenno	Mario Amendola; Ruggero Maccari	Vinicio Sofia, Alberto Sorrentino, Fulvia Franco	Comedy	
The Boatman of Amalfi	Mino Roli	Mario Vitale, Franca Marzi, Guido Celano	Drama	
Bread, Love and Jealousy	Luigi Comencini	Vittorio De Sica, Gina Lollobrigida, Marisa Merlini	Pink neorealism	Sequel of Bread, Love and Dreams.

== C-F ==
Title	Director	Cast	Genre	Notes
Camilla	Luciano Emmer	Gabriele Ferzetti, Franco Fabrizi	Comedy drama	
Cardinal Lambertini	Giorgio Pastina	Gino Cervi, Nadia Gray, Virna Lisi	Historical comedy	
Carovana di canzoni	Sergio Corbucci	Achille Togliani, Elena Kleus	Musical comedy	
Cañas y barro	Juan de Orduña	Ana Amendola, Virgílio Teixeira	Drama	
Cento serenate	Anton Giulio Majano	Giacomo Rondinella, Maria Fiore, Gérard Landry	Romance	
The Cheerful Squadron	Paolo Moffa	Vittorio De Sica, Paolo Stoppa, Alberto Sordi, Silvana Pampanini	Comedy	Co-production with France
Concert of Intrigue	Mario Bonnard	Lucia Bosè, Brigitte Bardot, Pierre Cressoy	Melodrama	Co-production with France
The Contessa's Secret	Georges Combret	Yvonne De Carlo, Georges Marchal, Rossano Brazzi	Historical	Co-production with France
Cose da pazzi	G.W. Pabst	Aldo Fabrizi, Carla Del Poggio	Drama	
The Count of Bragelonne	Fernando Cerchio	Georges Marchal, Dawn Addams, Jacques Dumesnil	Adventure	Co-production with France
The Count of Monte Cristo	Robert Vernay	Jean Marais, Lia Amanda, Roger Pigaut	Adventure	Co-production with France
The Country of the Campanelli	Jean Boyer	Sophia Loren, Carlo Dapporto, Mario Riva	Comedy	Co-production with France
The Courier of Moncenisio	Guido Brignone	Roldano Lupi, Virna Lisi	Adventure	Co-production with France
Crime at the Concert Mayol	Pierre Mere	Jean Tissier, Jean-Pierre Kérien, Claude Godard	Crime thriller	Co-production with France
Cronaca di un delitto	Mario Sequi	Linda Sini, Saro Urzì, Lola Braccini	Thriller	
Crossed Swords	Milton Krims	Errol Flynn, Gina Lollobrigida, Nadia Gray	Swashbuckler	Co-production with the US
Chronicle of Poor Lovers	Carlo Lizzani	Anna Maria Ferrero, Marcello Mastroianni	Drama	Cannes Award. 2 Nastro d'Argento
Cuore di mamma	Salvatore Samperi	Philippe Leroy, Beba Lončar	Comedy drama	
Dangerous Turning	Robert Bibal	Viviane Romance, Philippe Lemaire, Armand Mestral	Drama	Co-production with France
Das ewige Lied der Liebe		Franco Fabrizi	Drama	
Daughters of Destiny	Marcello Pagliero	Claudette Colbert, Michèle Morgan, Martine Carol	Comedy drama	Co-production with France
A Day in Court	Steno	Peppino De Filippo, Silvana Pampanini, Sophia Loren	Comedy	
Days of Love	Giuseppe De Santis	Marcello Mastroianni, Marina Vlady, Giulio Calì	Comedy	
Desiderio 'e sole	Giorgio Pastina	Giacomo Rondinella, Otello Toso, Virna Lisi	Drama	
Disowned	Giorgio Walter Chili	Alberto Farnese, Hélène Rémy, Laura Nucci	Drama	
The Doctor of the Mad	Mario Mattoli	Totò, Franca Marzi, Vittoria Crispo	Comedy	
Due lacrime	Giuseppe Vari	Alberto Farnese, Irène Galter, Marisa Merlini	Drama	
Due soldi di felicità	Roberto Amoroso	Maria Pia Casilio, Armando Francioli	Comedy	
Farewell, My Beautiful Lady	Fernando Cerchio	Gino Cervi, Alba Arnova, Laura Gore	Drama	
Fear	Roberto Rossellini	Ingrid Bergman, Mathias Wieman, Kurt Kreuger	Drama	Co-production with West Germany
Flesh and the Woman	Robert Siodmak	Gina Lollobrigida, Jean-Claude Pascal, Arletty	Drama	Co-production with France
Foglio di via	Carlo Campogalliani	Cosetta Greco, Renato Baldini, Massimo Serato	Drama	
Folgore Division	Duilio Coletti	Ettore Manni, Fausto Tozzi, Marco Guglielmi	War	
Francis the Smuggler	Gianfranco Parolini	Roberto Mauri, Doris Duranti	Drama	
A Free Woman	Vittorio Cottafavi	Pierre Cressoy, Gino Cervi, Elisa Cegani	Melodrama	
French Cancan	Jean Renoir	Jean Gabin, Françoise Arnoul, María Félix	Musical	Co-production with France

== G-I ==
Title	Director	Cast	Genre	Notes
Giove in doppiopetto	Daniele D'Anza	Carlo Dapporto, Delia Scala, Gianni Agus	Musical comedy	
The Gold of Naples	Vittorio De Sica	Totò, Sophia Loren, Silvana Mangano	Comedy-Drama	2 Nastro d'Argento. Anthology. Close to Italian neorealism.
Gran varietà	Domenico Paolella	Oreste Biancole, Dino Falconi	Musical comedy	
Graziella	Giorgio Bianchi	Maria Fiore, Elisa Cegani, Jean-Pierre Mocky	Melodrama	
Guai ai vinti	Raffaello Matarazzo	Lea Padovani, Anna Maria Ferrero	Melodrama	
Hanno rubato un tram	Mario Bonnard, Aldo Fabrizi	Aldo Fabrizi, Carlo Campanini, Juan de Landa	Comedy	
High School	Luciano Emmer	Giulia Rubini, Ilaria Occhini, Anna Maria Sandri	Comedy drama	
Ho pianto per te	Gino Rippo	Virginia Belmont, Guido Celano, Mariemma Bardi	Drama	
Ho ritrovato mio figlio	Elio Piccon	Carlo Campanini, Ennio Girolami, Bianca Doria	Drama	
House of Ricordi	Carmine Gallone	Roland Alexandre, Myriam Bru, Elisa Cegani	Historical	
Human Torpedoes	Antonio Leonviola	Raf Vallone, Franco Fabrizi, Andrea Checchi	War	Co-production with France
A Hundred Years of Love	Lionello De Felice	Aldo Fabrizi, Vittorio De Sica, Maurice Chevalier	Comedy drama	Anthology
I cavalieri della regina	Joseph Lerner; Mauro Bolognini	Jeffrey Stone, Domenico Modugno	Adventure	
I cinque dell'adamello	Pino Mercanti	Fausto Tozzi, Nadia Gray, Franco Balducci	War drama	
I misteri della giungla nera	Gian Paolo Callegari, Ralph Murphy	Lex Barker, Fiorella Mari, Paul Muller	Adventure	Co-production with the US
Il figlio dell'uomo	Virgilio Sabel; Ocen Tworkow	Eugenio Valenti, Fiorella Mari		
Il grande addio	Renato Polselli	Dante Maggio, Luisa Rossi, Jacques Sernas	Drama	
Il porto della speranza	Enzo Liberti	Checco Durante, Anita Durante, Leila Durante	Drama	
Il seduttore	Franco Rossi	Alberto Sordi, Lea Padovani, Lia Amanda	Comedy	
The Island Monster	Roberto Bianchi Montero	Boris Karloff, Franca Marzi, Germana Paolieri	Thriller	
The Island Princess	Paolo Moffa	Silvana Pampanini, Marcello Mastroianni, Gustavo Rojo	Comedy	Co-production with Spain
It Happened at the Police Station	Giorgio Simonelli	Nino Taranto, Alberto Sordi, Lucia Bosè	Comedy	
It Takes Two to Sin in Love	Vittorio Cottafavi	Giorgio De Lullo, Cosetta Greco, Alda Mangini	Drama	

== J-M ==
Title	Director	Cast	Genre	Notes
Joan of Arc at the Stake	Roberto Rossellini	Ingrid Bergman, Tullio Carminati, Giacinto Prandelli	Historical	Based on Jeanne d'Arc au Bûcher by Paul Claudel.
Journey to Italy	Roberto Rossellini	Ingrid Bergman, George Sanders, Maria Mauban	Italian neorealism	Filmed in Naples and Pompeii. Spoken in English
The King's Prisoner	Giorgio Venturini	Pierre Cressoy, Xenia Valderi, Luigi Tosi	Historical	
The Last Race	Piero Costa	Vera Bergman, Enzo Fiermonte, Checco Durante	Drama	
Laugh! Laugh! Laugh!	Edoardo Anton	Ugo Tognazzi, Carlo Dapporto, Tino Scotti	Comedy	
La campana di San Giusto	Mario Amendola; Ruggero Maccari	Andrea Checchi, Gaby André, Roldano Lupi	War	
La chair et le diable	Jean Josipovici	Viviane Romance, Rossano Brazzi, Peter van Eyck	Drama	Co-production with France
La grande avventura	Mario Pisu	Mara Lane, Gino Cervi, Carlo Ninchi	Historical	
La Luciana	Domenico Gambino	Elli Parvo, Gianni Musy, Luigi Tosi	Drama	
La pattuglia sperduta	Piero Nelli	Annibale Biglione, Óscar Navarro	War drama	
La prigioniera di Amalfi	Giorgio Cristallini	Luciana Vedovelli, Narciso Parigi	Adventure	
La strada	Federico Fellini	Anthony Quinn, Giulietta Masina, Richard Basehart	Drama	Academy Award for Best Foreign Language Film New York Film Critics Circle Awards won. Venice Award. 2 Nastro d'Argento. Academy Award nominee for best script
La tua donna	Giovanni Paolucci	Alan Furlan, Massimo Girotti, Lea Padovani, Patricia Neal	Drama	
La vendetta dei Tughs	Gian Paolo Callegari; Ralph Murphy	Lex Barker, Fiorella Mari	Crime thriller	
Le avventure di Cartouche	Steven Sekely; Gianni Vernuccio	Richard Basehart, Patricia Roc, Massimo Serato	Adventure	
Les révoltés de Lomanach	Richard Pottier	Dany Robin, Amedeo Nazzari	Adventure	Co-production with France
Letter from Naples	Giorgio Pastina	Virna Lisi, Otello Toso, Lianella Carell	Musical	
Lost Continent	Enrico Gras, Giorgio Moser		Documentary	Entered into the 5th Berlin International Film Festival
Love Song	Giorgio Simonelli	Claudio Villa, Maria Fiore, Walter Santesso	Musical	
The Lovers of Manon Lescaut	Mario Costa	Myriam Bru, Franco Interlenghi, Marisa Merlini	Historical	Co-production with France
Loves of Three Queens	Marc Allégret, Edgar G. Ulmer	Hedy Lamarr, Massimo Serato, Elli Parvo	Anthology	
Madame Butterfly	Carmine Gallone	Kaoru Yachigusa, Nicola Filacuridi, Michiko Tanaka	Opera	Co-production with Japan
Madame du Barry	Christian-Jaque	Martine Carol, Daniel Ivernel, Gianna Maria Canale	Historical	Co-production with France
Maddalena	Augusto Genina	Märta Torén, Gino Cervi, Charles Vanel	Drama	Co-production with France. Entered into the 1954 Cannes Film Festival
Madonna delle rose	Enzo Di Gianni	Marco Vicario, Eva Nova, Ave Ninchi	Drama	
Mam'zelle Nitouche	Yves Allégret	Fernandel, Pier Angeli, Jean Debucourt	Comedy	Co-production with France
Mambo	Robert Rossen	Silvana Mangano, Michael Rennie, Vittorio Gassman	Drama	Co-production with the US
Marriage	Antonio Petrucci	Vittorio De Sica, Silvana Pampanini, Alberto Sordi	Comedy	
Mata Hari's Daughter	Carmine Gallone	Ludmilla Tchérina, Erno Crisa, Milly Vitale	Adventure	Co-production with France
Mid-Century Loves	Glauco Pellegrini, Pietro Germi, Mario Chiari; Roberto Rossellini, Antonio Pietrangeli	Franco Interlenghi, Leonora Ruffo	Comedy drama	Anthology
Milanese in Naples	Enzo Di Gianni	Eva Nova, Ugo Tognazzi, Carlo Campanini	Comedy	
Mizar	Francesco De Robertis	Silvana Jachino, Antonio Centa, Lia Di Leo	War drama	
Modern Virgin	Gabriele Ferzetti	Vittorio De Sica, May Britt, Gabriele Ferzetti	Melodrama	
Mother's Heart	Luigi Capuano	Giacomo Rondinella, Toti Dal Monte	Crime	
My Seven Little Sins	Jean Boyer	Maurice Chevalier, Delia Scala, Colette Ripert	Comedy	Co-production with France

== N-P ==
Title	Director	Cast	Genre	Notes
Naples Is Always Naples	Armando Fizzarotti	Lea Padovani, Renato Baldini, Valeria Moriconi	Drama	
Napoli piange e ride	Flavio Calzavara	Luciano Tajoli, Jula De Palma	Musical comedy	
Napoli terra d'amore	Camillo Mastrocinque	Beniamino Maggio, Maria Fiore, Lucien Gallas	Drama	
Neapolitan Carousel	Ettore Giannini	Léonide Massine, Sophia Loren, Paolo Stoppa	Musical comedy	Entered into the 1954 Cannes Film Festival
Nel gorgo del peccato	Vittorio Cottafavi	Elisa Cegani, Fausto Tozzi, Margot Hielscher	Drama	Co-production with West Germany
Obsession	Jean Delannoy	Michèle Morgan, Raf Vallone, Marthe Mercadier	Crime drama	Co-production with France
Of Life and Love	Aldo Fabrizi, Giorgio Pastina, Mario Soldati, Luigi Zampa	Lucia Bosé, Totò, Myriam Bru	Anthology	
On Trial	Julien Duvivier	Daniel Gélin, Madeleine Robinson	Drama	Co-production with France
One Step to Eternity	Henri Decoin	Danielle Darrieux, Michel Auclair, Corinne Calvet	Thriller	Co-production with France
Orient Express	Carlo Ludovico Bragaglia	Silvana Pampanini, Henri Vidal, Eva Bartok	Drama	Co-production with France
Orphan of the Ghetto	Carlo Campogalliani	Franca Marzi, Luisella Boni, Alberto Farnese	Melodrama	
Papà Pacifico	Guido Brignone	Antonella Lualdi, Frank Latimore, Galeazzo Benti	Comedy	
A Parisian in Rome	Erich Kobler	Barbara Laage, Alberto Sordi, Anna Maria Ferrero	Comedy	Co-production with West Germany
Peppino e la nobile dama	Piero Ballerini	Peppino De Filippo, Emma Gramatica, Eloisa Cianni	Comedy	
Picasso	Luciano Emmer	Jean Davy, Pablo Picasso	Documentary	
Piccola santa	Roberto Bianchi Montero	Virna Lisi, Rosario Borelli, Tina Lattanzi	Drama	
Pietà per chi cade	Mario Costa	Amedeo Nazzari, Antonella Lualdi, Nadia Gray, Lída Baarová	Melodrama	
Piscatore 'e Pusilleco	Giorgio Capitani	Giacomo Rondinella, Cristina Grado, Otello Toso	Drama	
Poverty and Nobility	Mario Mattòli	Totò, Sophia Loren, Valeria Moriconi	Comedy	
Proibito (film)	Mario Monicelli	Mel Ferrer, Amedeo Nazzari, Lea Massari	Drama	
Public Opinion	Goffredo Alessandrini	Daniel Gélin, Delia Scala, Maria Mauban	Drama	Co-production with France

== Q-S ==
Title	Director	Cast	Genre	Notes
Queen Margot	Jean Dréville	Jeanne Moreau, Armando Francioli, Françoise Rosay	Historical	Co-production with France
Queen of Babylon	Carlo Ludovico Bragaglia	Rhonda Fleming, Ricardo Montalbán, Roldano Lupi	Historical	
Questi fantasmi	Eduardo De Filippo	Renato Rascel, Erno Crisa, Franca Valeri	Comedy	
Rasputin	Georges Combret	Pierre Brasseur, Isa Miranda, Milly Vitale	Historical	Co-production with France
The Red and the Black	Claude Autant-Lara	Gérard Philipe, Danielle Darrieux, Antonella Lualdi	Drama	Co-production with France
Rigoletto	Flavio Calzavara	Aldo Silvani, Gérard Landry, Loris Gizzi	Musical	
Ritrovarsi all'alba	Adolfo Pizzi	Franca Marzi, Philippe Hersent, Dario Michaelis	Drama	
The River Girl	Mario Soldati	Sophia Loren, Gérard Oury, Lise Bourdin	Drama	Co-production with France
Romeo and Juliet	Renato Castellani	Laurence Harvey, Flora Robson, Bill Travers	Drama	Co-production with Britain
Royal Affairs in Versailles	Sacha Guitry	Michel Auclair, Jean-Pierre Aumont, Claudette Colbert	Historical	Co-production with France
Schiava del peccato	Raffaello Matarazzo	Silvana Pampanini, Marcello Mastroianni, Irene Genna	Melodrama	
Scuola elementare	Alberto Lattuada	Alberto Rabagliati, Mario Riva, Lise Bourdin	Comedy	
The Secret of Helene Marimon	Henri Calef	Isa Miranda, Franck Villard, Carla Del Poggio	Drama	Co-production with France
Senso	Luchino Visconti	Alida Valli, Farley Granger, Massimo Girotti	Historical drama	About the Italian unification. Based on Senso (book) by Camillo Boito. Italian government forced to cut its original ending
The Shadow	Giorgio Bianchi	Märta Torén, Pierre Cressoy, Gianna Maria Canale	Melodrama	
A Slice of Life	Alessandro Blasetti, Paul Paviot	Vittorio De Sica, Yves Montand, Sophia Loren	Comedy	Co-production with France
Spring Song	Hans Albin	Anne-Marie Blanc, René Deltgen, Albert Lieven	Drama	Co-production with West Germany
Storm	Pierre Billon, Giorgio Capitani	Raf Vallone, Françoise Arnoul, Elena Varzi	Drama	Co-production with Italy
The Stranger's Hand	Mario Soldati	Trevor Howard, Alida Valli, Richard Basehart	Thriller	Co-production with Britain
Submarine Attack	Duilio Coletti	Renato Baldini, Lois Maxwell, Folco Lulli	War	Entered into the 4th Berlin International Film Festival
Symphony of Love	Glauco Pellegrini	Claude Laydu, Marina Vlady, Lucia Bosé	Musical	Co-production with France

== T-Z ==
Title	Director	Cast	Genre	Notes
Tears of Love	Pino Mercanti	Achille Togliani, Katina Ranieri, Otello Toso	Musical comedy	
Theodora, Slave Empress	Riccardo Freda	Gianna Maria Canale, Georges Marchal, Irene Papas	Sword and sandal	Co-production with France
The Three Thieves	Lionello De Felice	Totò, Jean-Claude Pascal, Simone Simon	Comedy	Co-production with France
Terra straniera	Sergio Corbucci	Lia Amanda, Jacques Sernas, Tamara Lees	Drama	
They Stole a Tram	Aldo Fabrizi	Aldo Fabrizi, Carlo Campanini, Juan de Landa	Comedy	
Too Bad She's Bad	Alessandro Blasetti	Sophia Loren, Marcello Mastroianni, Vittorio De Sica	Comedy	
Torna!	Raffaello Matarazzo	Amedeo Nazzari, Yvonne Sanson, Franco Fabrizi	Melodrama	
Toto in Hell	Camillo Mastrocinque	Totò, Maria Frau, Nerio Bernardi	Fantasy comedy	
Toto Seeks Peace	Mario Mattoli	Totò, Isa Barzizza, Ave Ninchi	Comedy	Co-production with France
Touchez pas au grisbi	Jacques Becker	Jean Gabin, René Dary, Jeanne Moreau	Crime	Co-production with France
Tragic Ballad	Luigi Capuano	Teddy Reno, Marisa Allasio, Beniamino Maggio	Drama	
Trieste cantico d'amore	Max Calandri	Vera Carmi, Nerio Bernardi, Alberto Sorrentino	Drama	
Tripoli, Beautiful Land of Love	Ferruccio Cerio	Alberto Sordi, Lyla Rocco, Fulvia Franco	Comedy	
Tua per la vita	Sergio Grieco	Gaby Andre, Ettore Manni, Gérard Landry	Drama	Co-production with France
The Two Orphans	Giacomo Gentilomo	Myriam Bru, Milly Vitale, André Luguet	Historical drama	Co-production with France
Ulysses	Mario Camerini, Mario Bava	Kirk Douglas, Silvana Mangano, Anthony Quinn	Adventure	
Ultima illusione	Vittorio Duse	Franco Pesce, Luisa Rivelli, Piero Lulli	Drama	
Una pelliccia di visone	Glauco Pellegrini	Giovanna Ralli, Roberto Risso, Carlo Mazzarella	Comedy	
Uomini ombra	Francesco De Robertis	Mara Lane, Eduardo Ciannelli, Giorgio Albertazzi	Spy	
Vestire gli ignudi	Marcello Pagliero	Pierre Brasseur, Eleonora Rossi Drago, Gabriele Ferzetti	Comedy drama	
Via Padova 46	Giorgio Bianchi	Peppino De Filippo, Alberto Sordi, Giulietta Masina	Comedy	
Violenza sul lago	Leonardo Cortese	Lia Amanda, Erno Crisa, Virna Lisi	Drama	
Where Is Freedom?	Roberto Rossellini	Totò, Franca Faldini, Vera Molnar	Comedy drama	
Woman of Rome	Luigi Zampa	Gina Lollobrigida, Daniel Gélin, Franco Fabrizi	Drama	Co-production with France
Women and Soldiers	Luigi Malerba	Marcella Mariani, Marco Ferreri	Historical	
