= Frühlingslied =

Fruhlingslied may refer to

== Film ==
- Heidi und Ihre Freunde 1954 German film by Hans Albin also released as 'Frühlingslied' List of Italian films of 1954

== Music ==
- Frühlingslied (Mendelssohn), Song without Words, Op. 62 No. 6 in A major 'Spring Song'
- "Frühlingslied", choral work by Carl Maria von Weber
- "Frühlingslied", song by Norbert Burgmüller (1810-1836)
- "Frühlingslied", song by Alexander Zemlinsky
- "Frühlingslied", song by Theodor Kirchner
- "Frühlingslied", song by Charles Ives
- "Frühlingslied", song by Brahms, to a poem by Geibel
- "Frühlingslied", Lieder (Bruckner) 1851 to a text by Heinrich Heine
- "Frühlingslied", song by Schumann to a minor poem by a schoolteacher Ferdinand Braun

== See also ==
- Spring Song (disambiguation)
