= Paolo Poli =

Italian actor

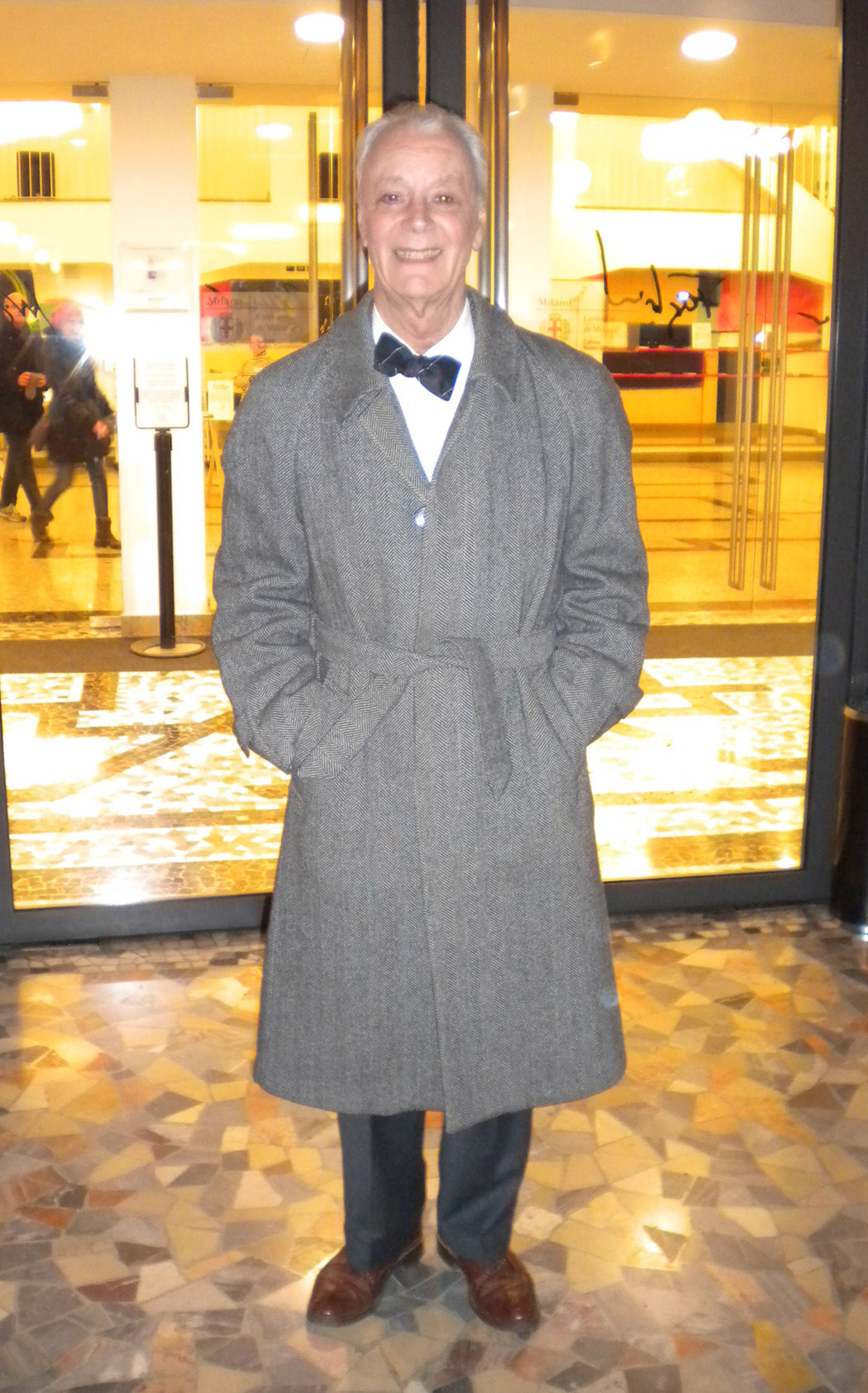
- Born: 23 May 1929; Florence, Toscana, Italy
- Died: 25 March 2016 (aged 86); Rome, Lazio, Italy
- Occupations: Theatre and film actor
- Years active: 1955–2016

Paolo Poli (May 23, 1929 – March 25, 2016) was an Italian theatre actor. He has also acted in films and on television.

== Career ==
After a university degree in French literature, Poli began his acting career in the early 1950s and was one of the first actors in Italy to perform en travesti roles. He is considered to be one of the greatest and most versatile of Italian theatrical actors.

He has acted in and directed a host of operettas, among which Aldino mi cali un filino, Rita of Cascia, Caterina de Medici, L'asino d'oro, Gulliver's Travels, La leggenda di San Gregorio, Il coturno della ciabatta, and La nemica by Dario Niccodemi. His Rita of Cascia prompted complaints from Italian president Oscar Luigi Scalfaro.

Well into his eighties, he continued performing on stage, most recently in Sillabari by Goffredo Parise and Aquiloni, taken from Giovanni Pascoli.

== Works ==
=== Theatre ===
- 1958 - Finale di partita from Samuel Beckett
- 1959 - Sorveglianza speciale, from Jean Genet
- 1960 - Mamma voglio il cerchio
- 1960 - Il novellino, from Masuccio Salernitano
- 1962 - Il Diavolo
- 1963 - Paolo Paoli, from Arthur Adamov
- 1964 - Il mondo d'acqua, from Aldo Nicolaj
- 1964 - Il candelaio, Paolo Poli and Ida Omboni, taken from Giordano Bruno
- 1965 - Un Milione from Sergio Tofano
- 1966 - Rita da Cascia
- 1967 - Il suggeritore nudo, from Filippo Tommaso Marinetti
- 1968 - La nemica, from Dario Niccodemi
- 1968 - Brasile, starring Marco Messeri
- 1969 - Tito Andronico, starring Marco Messeri
- 1969 - La rappresentazione di Giovanni e Paolo
- 1969 - Carolina Invernizio
- 1970 - La vispa Teresa
- 1971 - Soirée Satie
- 1971 - L'uomo nero
- 1972 - Giallo!!!, Ida Omboni and Paolo Poli
- 1973 - Apocalisse
- 1975 - Femminilità
- 1976 - Rosmunda, from Vittorio Alfieri, starring Marco Messeri
- 1978 - Mezzacoda
- 1979 - Mistica, taken from Antonio Fogazzaro
- 1980 - Il Morino, Bruno Carbocci, starring Marco Messeri
- 1981 - Paradosso, from Denis Diderot, Aldo Palazzeschi and Guido Gozzano
- 1982 - Bus, taken from Esercizi di stile from Raymond Queneau
- 1983 - Magnificat
- 1985 - Cane e gatto, from Aldo Palazzeschi, Tommaso Landolfi, Riccardo Bacchelli and Alberto Moravia
- 1986 - Farfalle, from Guido Gozzano
- 1988 - I legami pericolosi, from Choderlos de Laclos, starring Milena Vukotic
- 1990 - Il coturno e la ciabatta, from Alberto Savinio
- 1992 - La leggenda di San Gregorio, from Hartmann von Aue
- 1994 - L'asino d'oro, from Apuleius
- 1997 - I viaggi di Gulliver (Gulliver's Travels), from Jonathan Swift starring Pino Strabioli
- 1999 - Caterina de Medici, taken from La Reine Margot, Alexandre Dumas
- 2000 - Il tranello di Medusa, from Erik Satie
- 2001 - Aldino mi cali un filino, d'Aldo Palazzeschi
- 2002 - Jacques il fatalista (Jacques le fataliste et son maître), de Denis Diderot
- 2004 - Il ponte di San Luis Rey, from Thornton Wilder
- 2006 - Sei brillanti, from Mura (Maria Volpi Nannipieri), Paola Masino, Irene Brin, Camilla Cederna, Natalia Aspesi and Elena Gianini Belotti
- 2007 - Favole, from Charles Perrault and Jeanne-Marie Leprince de Beaumont
- 2008 - Sillabari, from Goffredo Parise
- 2010 - Il Mare, from Anna Maria Ortese
- 2012 - Aquiloni, taken from Giovanni Pascoli

=== Television ===
- Souper, director Vito Molinari, 1960
- Tutto da rifare pover'uomo, telefilm director Eros Macchi, 1960
- Ricordati di Cesare, starring Dory Dorika, Elsa Merlini, Aldo Silvani, Federico Collino, Paolo Poli, Mila Sannoner, director Alessandro Brissoni, 1962
- Champignol senza volerlo, director Silverio Blasi, 1963
- Gli equivici di una notte, form Oliver Goldsmith, director Edmo Fenoglio, 1964
- Chi non-prova non-ci crede, director Carlo Di Stefano, 1968
- Il Re non-fa per me, director de Massimo Scaglione en 1969
- Babau 70, variety of Ida Omboni and Paolo Poli, director Vito Molinari; 1970, stopped from RAI and acted in 1976 only, starring Marco Messeri, Laura Betti, Adriana Asti, Camilla Cederna, Umberto Eco, Fabrizio De André
- Al Cavallino Bianco, operetta, 1974
- La strana storia del dottor White e del signor Black, mini-telefilm, director Norman Mozzato en 1975
- The Three Musketeers mini-telefilm; director Sandro Sequi, 1976, starring Marco Messeri, Lucia Poli and Milena Vukotic
- Scene La Crisalide from the mini-telefilm Racconti di fantascienza, director Alessandro Blasetti, 1979.

=== Filmography ===
- The Two Orphans (1954, director Giacomo Gentilomo) - Pierre Frochard
- The Lovers of Manon Lescaut (1954, director Mario Costa) - Tiberge
- Non c'è amore più grande (1955, director Giorgio Bianchi)
- Camping (1958, director Franco Zeffirelli)
- Cronache del '22, scene Giorno di paga (1961, director Guidarino Guidi)
- Per amore... per magia... (1967, director Duccio Tessari) - Jo Babà
- H2S (1969, director Roberto Faenza) - Anna Mazzamauro
- The Golden Ass (1970, director Sergio Spina) - Genesio
- La piazza vuota (1971, director Beppe Recchia)
- Le braghe del padrone (1978, director Flavio Mogherini) - Il diavolo

=== Books ===
- Ida Omboni and Paolo Poli, Rita da Cascia, Milano Libri, Milan 1967.
- Ida Omboni and Paolo Poli, Carolina Invernizio, Milano Libri, Milan 1970.
- Paolo Poli, Telefoni bianchi e camicie nere (with pièces' text L'uomo nero et Femminilità de Ida Omboni et Paolo Poli), Garzanti, Milan 1975.
- Ida Omboni and Paolo Poli, Giallo!, Arnoldo Mondadori Editore, Milan 1977.
- Ida Omboni and Paolo Poli, Mistica..., Editori del Grifo, Montepulciano 1980.
- Ida Omboni and Paolo Poli, Giuseppe Giuseppe! - filastroccario verdiano, Editori del Grifo, Montepulciano 1981.

=== Bibliography ===
- Rodolfo di Gianmarco, Paolo Poli, Gremese Editore, Rome, 1985.
- Andrea Pini, Paolo Poli. L’amore gay nell’Italia del dopoguerra fino a oggi, Pride (Revue) n. 66, December 2004.
- Eva Marinai, Gobbi, dritti e la satira molesta. Copioni di voci, immagini di scena (1951-1967), ETS, Pisa 2007.
- Andrea Jelardi, Queer Tv-omosessualità e trasgressione nella tv italiana, introduction of Carlo Freccero, Croce, Rome, 2006.
- Interview to Paolo Poli (Gianluca Meis writer) page about Poli in: Andrea Jelardi, In scena en travesti-Il Travestitismo nello spettacolo italiano, Croce, Rome, 2009.
- Paolo Poli, Siamo tutte delle gran bugiarde. Conversazioni con Giovanni Pannacci, Giulio Perrone Editore, Rome, 2009, ISBN 978-88-6004-139-5
- Il Radiocorriere, different years

== Gallery ==
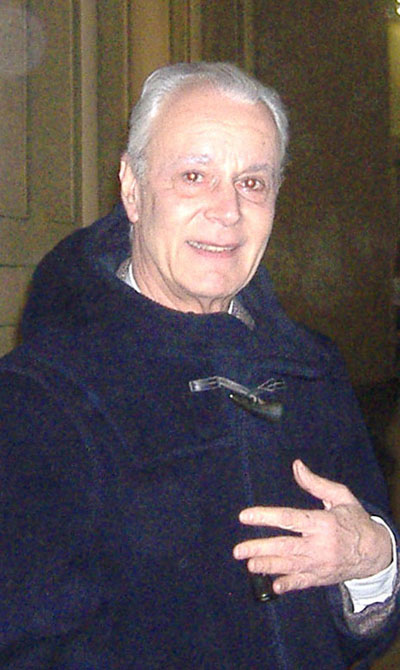
Paolo Poli after the piece Sei Brillanti, at Teatro Carcano, Milan, 2007.

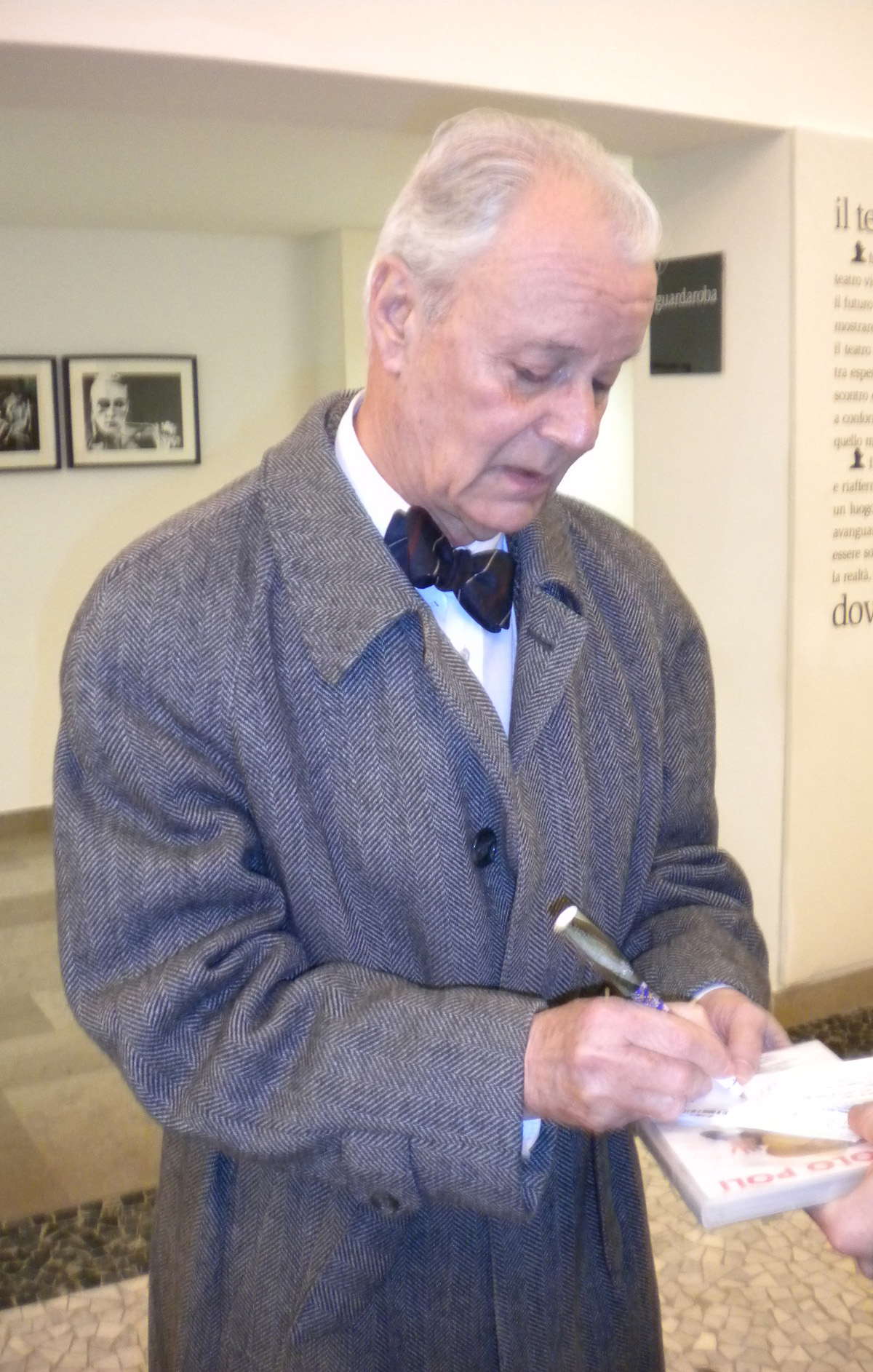
Paolo Poli, at Teatro dell'Elfo in Milan, January 2013.
