= Revelation (1955 film) =

- Directed by: Mario Costa
- Screenplay by: Aldo De Benedetti; Alberto Albani Barbieri
- Story by: Guido Milanesi
- Produced by: Ermanno Donati; Luigi Carpentieri
- Starring: May Britt; Francisco Rabal; Bernard Blier
- Cinematography: Carlo Carlini
- Edited by: Roberto Cinquini; Ornella Micheli
- Music by: Carlo Rustichelli
- Release date: 30 December 1955
- Language: Italian

Revelation (Italian: Prigionieri del male, Spanish: Revelación) is a 1955 Italian-Spanish melodrama film written and directed by Mario Costa and starring May Britt, Francisco Rabal, Bernard Blier and Vera Carmi. It grossed 73.2 million lire at the Italian box office.

== Plot ==
A plane crashes into the sea, among the survivors a young atheist Russian journalist, Nadia Ulianova, traveling to investigate Catholicism in Italy, and a Catholic priest, Father Lorenzo.

The news of the accident and the name of the people involved spark the curiosity of Elena, a lady of Russian origin, married to an Italian engineer, who has serious elements to think that Nadia is her younger sister. The woman manages to convince the survivor to move to Naples, to her home. From this moment the young Russian discovers a new reality: she rediscovers the affection of the family, the love for a young person and the faith in the Madonna.

== Production ==
The film, the result of a co-production with Spain, is part of the sentimental melodramas, commonly called tearjerking, very popular in that period among the Italian public, later renamed by critics with the term neorealism of appendix.

== Cast ==
- May Britt as Nadia Ulianova
- Francisco Rabal as Sergio
- Bernard Blier as Father Lorenzo
- Vera Carmi as Elena
- Julio Peña as Elena's husband
- Nino Manfredi as Mario Giorgi
- Augusto Pennella as Nandino
- Ada Colangeli
- Miranda Campa
- Cristina Grado
