= What Scoundrels Men Are! =

What Scoundrels Men Are! may refer to:

- What Scoundrels Men Are! (1932 film), an Italian "white-telephones" comedy film
- What Scoundrels Men Are! (1953 film), an Italian comedy film, a remake of the above
