= Isabelle Corey =

French actress and model

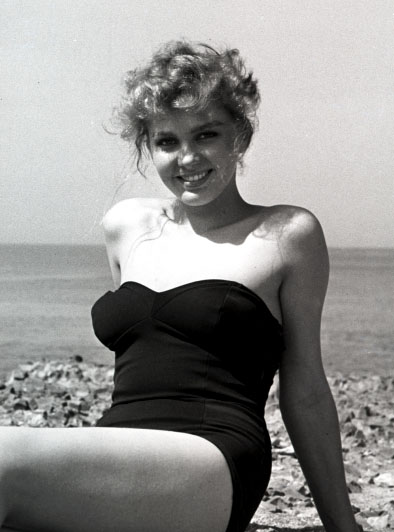
- Corey in 1959
- Born: 29 May 1939
- Died: 6 February 2011 (aged 71)
- Occupations: Actress; Model

Isabelle Corey (29 May 1939 – 6 February 2011) was a French actress and model.

Corey started modeling in Paris in her teens for magazines such as Jardin des Modes, Elle and Madame Figaro. She was discovered in the Latin Quarter, where she lived with her parents, by Jean-Pierre Melville and was offered the lead in his classic film noir, Bob le flambeur.

== Filmography ==
Year	Title	Director
1956	Bob le flambeur	Jean-Pierre Melville
1956	And God Created Woman	Roger Vadim
1957	La Ragazza della salina	František Čáp
1957	Souvenirs d'Italie (Souvenir d'Italie)	Antonio Pietrangeli
1957	Vacanze a Ischia	Mario Camerini
1958	Afrodite, dea dell'amore	Mario Bonnard
1958	Adorabili e bugiarde	Nunzio Malasomma
1958	Young Husbands (Giovani mariti)	Mauro Bolognini
1958	Amore a prima vista	Franco Rossi
1959	The Friend of the Jaguar	Giuseppe Bennati
1959	Head of a Tyrant (Giuditta e Oloferne)	Fernando Cerchio
1960	Vacanze in Argentina	Guido Leoni
1960	From a Roman Balcony (La Giornata balorda)	Mauro Bolognini
1961	The Last of the Vikings (L'ultimo dei Vikinghi)	Giacomo Gentilomo and Mario Bava
1961	Vanina Vanini	Roberto Rossellini
1961	The Invincible Gladiator (Il gladiatore invincibile)	Alberto De Martino
