= The Traffic Policeman =

The Traffic Policeman (Il vigile)
- Italian poster
- Directed by: Luigi Zampa
- Written by: Ugo Guerra; Rodolfo Sonego; Luigi Zampa
- Produced by: Guido Giambartolomei
- Starring: Alberto Sordi; Vittorio De Sica; Marisa Merlini; Sylva Koscina; Mario Riva
- Cinematography: Leonida Barboni
- Edited by: Guido Giambartolomei
- Music by: Piero Umiliani
- Release date: 1960
- Running time: 100 minutes
- Country: Italy
- Language: Italian

The Traffic Policeman (Italian: Il vigile) is a 1960 Italian comedy film directed by Luigi Zampa and starring Alberto Sordi in the lead role. A representative of the commedia all'italiana genre, it tells the story of a traffic policeman and the injustice he endures for daring to enforce the law at the expense of people in power.

== Plot ==
Otello Celletti is a war veteran from a small town in Latium. He has been unemployed since the end of the war and lives with his father, wife Amalia and their son, at the expense of his brother-in-law. When he is offered a menial job in the town's markets thanks to his son heroism in saving the drowning son of a council member, Otello refuses in disdain. After vehemently insisting with the town's Mayor and by leveraging his veteran status and war wounds, Otello eventually obtains a position with the local traffic police, which he immediately use to assert himself on his neighbors and acquaintances who had been mocking his laziness. He performs his duties poorly and abuses his authority to exact petty revenge upon those who had been teasing him while jobless, including his brother in law who had been hosting and supporting him.

One day, Otello finds himself offering roadside assistance to famous actress Sylva Koscina. He indulges in pleasantries with the actress, inviting her for coffee and opting not to fine her for missing her driving license and car documents, while making his son fix her car. That night, during a guest appearance on the television program Il Musichiere in front of 18 million viewers, Sylva publicly greets Otello but, at the insistence of host Mario Riva, and she also reveals how Otello let her go when he should have fined or even arrested her.

Following the incident and under political pressure, the Mayor berates Otello for tarnishing the public image of the police force, threatening to fire him. Shortly thereafter, Otello catches the Mayor himself speeding on a dangerous curve. Believing his integrity is being tested, Otello chases the Mayor on his way to meet his mistress, eventually issuing a speeding ticket, which involuntarily exposes the Mayor's extramarital affair. Angered, the Mayor demotes Otello and appeals the fine.

Otello decries his treatment to the local monarchists, who choose him as their candidate at the upcoming local election opposite the current Mayor. In a private meeting with the Mayor's party members, an invigorated Otello threatens to expose knowledge of years of mismanagement by the Mayor's administration, as it had been fed to him by the monarchists' party. In response, the Mayor produces evidence of compromising information about Otello and his family: Otello's sister, who was thought to be a masseuse in Milan, is instead a prostitute; Otello himself is not legally married to Amalia, as her legal husband in pre-divorce Italy still lives; and Otello's father, whom he believed a Great War hero, had instead served time for accidentally shooting King Victor Emmanuel III, a fact that if known would alienate the monarchists.

At the next day's appeal hearing, Otello relents and exonerates the Mayor, pretending he unduly fined him out of a faulty speedometer reading and also withdrawing his candidacy. Some time after being reinstated as a traffic policeman, Otello is shown making way for the Mayor as he speeds once again along the same curve, only for the Mayor to crash his car and be hospitalized, thus serving poetic justice to Otello.

== Cast ==
- Alberto Sordi - Otello Celletti
- Vittorio De Sica - The Mayor
- Marisa Merlini - Amalia Celletti
- Sylva Koscina - herself
- Mario Riva - himself
- Mara Berni - Mayor's lover
- Nando Bruno - Celletti's brother-in-law
- Riccardo Garrone - Police lieutenant
- Lia Zoppelli - Mayor's Wife
- Franco Di Trocchio - Celletti's son
- Carlo Pisacane - Celletti's father
