= Immortal Melodies =

1952 film

- Film poster
- Directed by: Giacomo Gentilomo
- Written by: Ivo Perilli; Liana Ferri; Giovanna Soria; Piero Pierotti; Giacomo Gentilomo
- Story by: Maleno Malenotti
- Produced by: Maleno Malenotti
- Starring: Pierre Cressoy; Carla Del Poggio; Vera Molnar
- Cinematography: Aldo Giordani
- Edited by: Elsa Dubbini
- Music by: Nino Rota
- Production company: Lux Film
- Distributed by: Lux Film
- Release date: 16 December 1952
- Running time: 96 minutes
- Country: Italy
- Language: Italian

Immortal Melodies (Italian: Melodie immortali, also known as Mascagni) is a 1952 Italian musical-biographical melodrama film directed by Giacomo Gentilomo and starring Pierre Cressoy, Carla Del Poggio and Vera Molnar. It is based on real life events of classical composer Pietro Mascagni. The film's sets were designed by the art director Alberto Boccianti.

== Cast ==
- Pierre Cressoy as Pietro Mascagni
- Carla Del Poggio as Lina, Mascagni's wife
- Vera Molnar as Wanda Pieri
- Mario Del Monaco as Stagno
- Nerio Bernardi as De Lellis
- Enzo Biliotti as Master Crepitone
- Mimo Billi as Navarra
- Giuseppe Chinnici as The Doctor
- Maurizio Di Nardo as Rocco
- Giovanni Grasso as Domenico Mascagni
- Achille Millo as Giuseppe
- Guido Riccioli as The Operetta Comic
- Ciro Scafa as Major of Cerignola
- Roberto Bruni as Giovanni Targioni-Tozzetti
- Franco Scandurra as Fumia
- Gian Paolo Rosmino as Guido Menasci
- Nino Vingelli as Fiorello
- Laura Carli as The Midwife
- Giovanni Bonos as Fantasista
- Nino Milano as Fantasista
- Giuseppe Addobbati as Gentleman at Teatro dell'Opera di Roma
- Giuseppe Morelli as Master Leopoldo Mugnone
- Franco Pesce
