= ...And the Wild Wild Women =

- Directed by: Renato Castellani
- Written by: Isa Mari ("Roma, Via delle Mantellate," novel); Renato Castellani (adaptation)
- Starring: Anna Magnani; Giulietta Masina
- Cinematography: Leonida Barboni
- Music by: Roman Vlad
- Release date: 1959
- Running time: 106 minutes
- Country: Italy
- Language: Italian

...And the Wild Wild Women (Italian: Nella città l'inferno, literally "Hell in the City") is a 1959 Italian film directed by Renato Castellani.

== Plot ==
When the wide-eyed Lina (Giulietta Masina) lands in a women's prison, she meets a world-weary prostitute named Egle (Anna Magnani) who looks out for her. After Egle teaches Lina what she knows and begins to harden the girl, Lina commits another crime on the outside and winds up back in jail, a shell of her former self. Egle, meanwhile, who had taken a genuine liking to Lina, has tried to better herself and is shocked to see what has become of her former protégé.

== Cast ==
- Anna Magnani: Egle
- Giulietta Masina: Lina
- Myriam Bru: Vittorina
- Cristina Gajoni: Marietta Mugnari
- Renato Salvatori: Piero
- Alberto Sordi: Antonio Zampi, aka Adone
- Angela Portaluri: Laura
- Milly Monti: Sister Giuseppina
- Maria Virginia Benati: Vera
- Marcella Rovena: Miss Luisa
- Gina Rovere: Delia
- Miranda Campa: Ida Maroni
- Saro Urzì: Marshall
- Sergio Fantoni: Judge
- Umberto Spadaro: Prison Director
