= Franco Scandurra =

Italian actor (1911–2003)

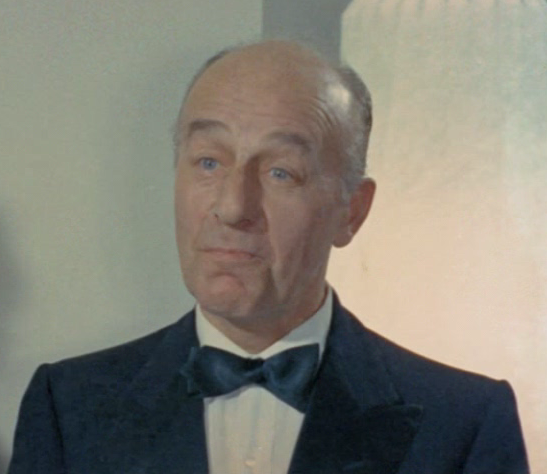
- Scandurra in Il ragazzo che sorride (1969)
- Born: 27 July 1911; Milan, Italy
- Died: 15 April 2003 (aged 91); Bologna, Italy
- Occupation: Actor
- Years active: 1941-1984

Franco Scandurra (27 July 1911 – 15 April 2003) was an Italian actor. He appeared in more than fifty films from 1941 to 1984.

== Filmography ==
Year	Title	Role	Notes
1941	Il re del circo		
1941	Luna di miele	Pettinelli	
1941	The Betrothed	Il conte Attilio	
1942	L'ultimo addio		
1943	Il birichino di papà	Roberto Della Bella	
1943	Incontri di notte	Franco Torre	
1944	Circo equestre Za-bum		(segment "Galop finale al circo")
1945	The Za-Bum Circus	Un altro autista	
1947	The Brothers Karamazov	Pjotr Ilic Perchòtin	
1951	The Two Sergeants		
1952	Ha da venì... don Calogero!	Avvocato	
1952	Mademoiselle Gobete	Il gendarme	
1952	Immortal Melodies	Fumia	
1953	Voice of Silence	Avvocato dell'accusa	
1954	It Takes Two to Sin in Love		
1954	Mid-Century Loves		(segment "Girandola 1910")
1954	Marriage	Andrej Andrejevich Niunin	
1954	Cento anni d'amore		(segment "Pendolin"), Uncredited
1954	Gran varietà	tenente dei dragoni	(episodio 'Fregoli')
1954	The Lovers of Manon Lescaut	Chatodoux	
1958	Girls for the Summer	Fefè	
1959	Uncle Was a Vampire	Il professore Stricker	
1960	Le pillole di Ercole		
1961	Le ambiziose	Conti	
1961	A Difficult Life	University Professor	Uncredited
1962	The Police Commissioner	Det. Matarazzo	
1962	Peccati d'estate	Direttore ristorante	
1962	The Golden Arrow	Bearded Genie	
1968	Be Sick... It's Free	Doctor Bui-Doctor on his deathbed	
1969	Il ragazzo che sorride	Scandini	
1971	Ma che musica maestro	Pompeo Ciova	
1975	Eye of the Cat	Willy - il maggiordomo	
1976	Goodnight, Ladies and Gentlemen	Dean Cardinal	Uncredited
1983	Questo e Quello	The Prince	(segment "Quello... col basco rosso")
1984	Everybody in Jail	President of the Court	(final film role)
