= They Were Three Hundred =

- Directed by: Gian Paolo Callegari
- Written by: Leopoldo Trieste; Gian Paolo Callegari; Giuseppe Mangione; Amedeo Marrosu
- Starring: Rossano Brazzi; Franca Marzi; Myriam Bru
- Cinematography: Vincenzo Seratrice
- Edited by: Giancarlo Cappelli
- Music by: Giovanni Fusco
- Production company: Pandora Film
- Distributed by: Indipendenti Regionali
- Release date: 17 November 1952
- Running time: 91 minutes
- Country: Italy
- Language: Italian

They Were Three Hundred (Italian: Eran trecento) is a 1952 Italian historical drama film directed by Gian Paolo Callegari and starring Rossano Brazzi, Franca Marzi and Myriam Bru. It was shot at the Scalera Studios in Rome with location shooting on the Via Tiburtina. The film's sets were designed by the art director Virgilio Marchi.

== Cast ==
- Rossano Brazzi as Volpintesta
- Franca Marzi as Sina
- Myriam Bru as Lucia
- Paola Barbara as Sabina, la governante
- Antonio Cifariello as Sgt. Cafiero
- Luisa Rivelli as Maria Antonia
- Roberto Mauri as Orsaja
- Peter Trent as Franco della Spina
- Franco Fabrizi as Carlo Pisacane
- Marco Guglielmi as Alfiere
- Armando Guarnieri as General Della Spina
- Franco Pesce as Beppe
- Fiorella Ferrero as Purificata
- Maria Belfadel as Suor Adelaide

== Bibliography ==
- Di Fiore, Gigi. Controstoria dell'unità d'Italia. Rizzoli, 2011.
