= Miranda Campa =

Swiss-born Italian actress and voice actress (1914–1989)

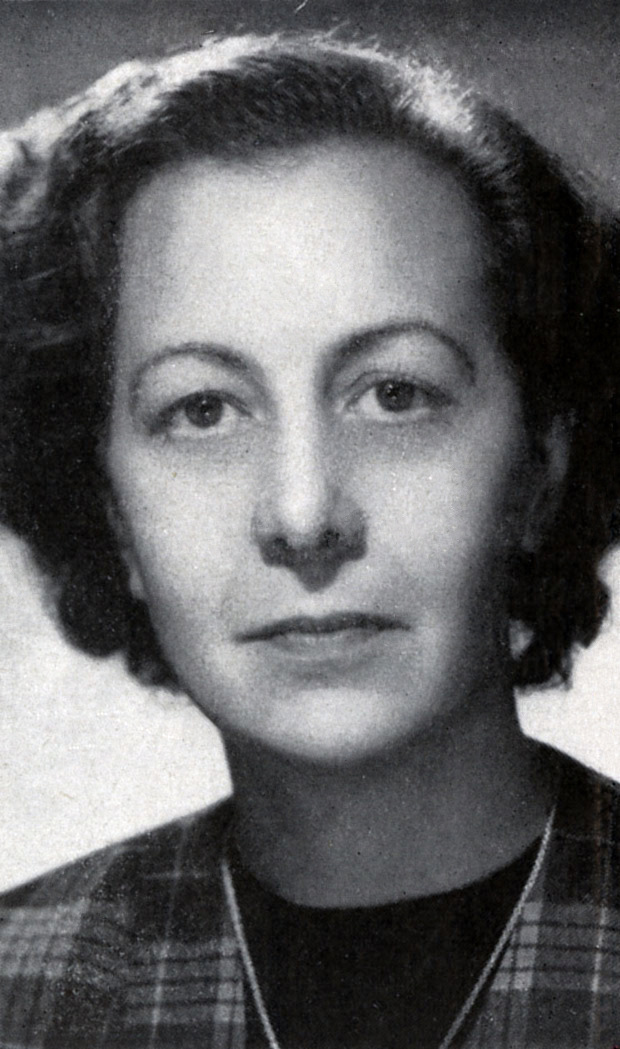
- Campa in Cineguida magazine, 1953
- Born: Liliana Campa Capodaglio; 31 January 1914; Geneva, Switzerland
- Died: 7 May 1989 (aged 75); Rome, Italy
- Occupation: Actress

Miranda Campa (31 January 1914 – 7 May 1989) was a Swiss-born Italian actress and voice actress.

== Life and career ==
Born Liliana Campa Capodaglio in Geneva, the niece of actors Pio Campa and Wanda Capodaglio, Campa studied acting at the Silvio d’Amico Academy of Dramatic Arts, graduating in 1938. Mainly active on stage, she was part of the theatrical companies of Vittorio Gassman, Andreina Pagnani and Giorgio Strehler at the Piccolo Teatro in Milan. She made her film debut in 1949, usually cast in character roles, often playing religious figures. Campa was also very active as a voice actress and as a dubber.

== Filmography ==
Year	Title	Role	Notes
1950	Son of d'Artagnan		
1950	Against the Law	La signora Curti	
1950	Red Seal		
1951	La grande rinuncia		
1952	Gli uomini non guardano il cielo	Madre del papa	
1953	The Return of Don Camillo	Signora Spiletti	
1953	I Always Loved You	Anna	
1954	Doctor Antonio		TV series
1954	Angels of Darkness		
1954	Pietà per chi cade	Nadia Berruti	
1954	Schiava del peccato	The Mother Superior	
1954	The King's Prisoner		
1954	The Two Orphans	The Mother Superior	
1955	Le signorine dello 04	Carlo Conti's Mother	
1955	Roman Tales	The Maid at Mazzoni Baralla's	Uncredited
1955	Prigionieri del male		
1957	I Vampiri	Signora Robert	
1957	Solo Dio mi fermerà		
1957	Le avventure di Roby e Buck		
1959	...And the Wild Wild Women	Ida Maroni	
1959	Cavalier in Devil's Castle		
1959	The Overtaxed	Fabio Topponi's wife	
1959	Non perdiamo la testa	Servant at Clackton's	Uncredited
1959	The Giant of Marathon	Andromeda's handmaid	
1960	The Dam on the Yellow River	Mary	
1960	Le signore		
1960	The Night They Killed Rasputin		
1960	Silver Spoon Set	Obstetrician	Uncredited
1960	Il carro armato dell'8 settembre		
1961	The Bacchantes	Queen Agave	
1961	The Centurion		
1961	Gold of Rome	Miss De Santis	
1961	Barabbas	Maria's Sister	Uncredited
1962	Letto di sabbia		
1962	Family Diary		
1962	Gladiator of Rome	Porzia, Valerio's Mother	
1970	The Priest's Wife	Valeria's Mother	
1971	Easy, Down There!		
1971	The Fourth Victim	Felicity Downing	
1972	Winged Devils		
1972	Canterbury proibito	Mother of Santa	(segment "Santa del Grande")
1973	A Brief Vacation	Nurse Guidotti	
1979	Womanlight	La bonne de Lydia	
1981	Sweet Dreams	Freud's Mother	
1982	Grog		
