= Stella's Favor =

- Directed by: Giancarlo Scarchilli
- Starring: Ornella Muti; Claudio Bigagli; Maria Amelia Monti; Urbano Barberini; Alessandro Gassmann
- Cinematography: Roberto Meddi
- Music by: Luis Bacalov
- Release date: 1996
- Country: Italy
- Language: Italian

Stella's Favor, originally Mi fai un favore, is a 1996 Italian comedy film directed by Giancarlo Scarchilli.

== Cast ==
- Ornella Muti: Stella
- Maria Amelia Monti: Roberta
- Claudio Bigagli: Leonardo
- Jo Champa: Stefania
- Alessandro Gassman: Rodolfo
- Franco Interlenghi: Mario
- Marisa Merlini: Amelia
- Paola Tiziana Cruciani: Cecilia
- Urbano Barberini: Tommy
- Julienne Liberto: Claudia
- Ewa Aulin: Dyane
