= The Last of the Vikings =

- Directed by: Giacomo Gentilomo (and Mario Bava uncredited)
- Written by: Arpad DeRiso; Luigi Mondello; Guido Zurli; Giacomo Gentilomo
- Produced by: Roberto Capitani; Luigi Mondello; Sam Schneider
- Starring: Cameron Mitchell; Edmund Purdom; Isabelle Corey; Hélène Rémy
- Cinematography: Enzo Serafin
- Edited by: Gino Talamo
- Music by: Roberto Nicolosi
- Production companies: Tiberius Film; Critérion Film; Galatea Film; Les Films du Cyclope
- Release date: 8 February 1961
- Running time: 103 minutes
- Countries: France; Italy
- Language: Italian

The Last of the Vikings (Italian: L'ultimo dei Vikinghi, French: Le Dernier des Vikings) is a 1961 French-Italian historical film directed by Giacomo Gentilomo and starring Cameron Mitchell, Edmund Purdom and Isabelle Corey. It was about Harald Sigurdsson. The film was allegedly co-directed by Mario Bava who was uncredited.

The film's sets were designed by the Italian art director Italo Tomassi.

== Cast ==
- Cameron Mitchell as Harald
- Edmund Purdom as King Sveno
- Isabelle Corey as Hilde
- Hélène Rémy as Edith / Elga
- Andrea Aureli as Haakon
- Mario Feliciani
- Aldo Bufi Landi as Londborg
- Carla Calò as Herta
- Corrado Annicelli as Godrun
- Nando Tamberlani as Gultred
- Nando Angelini as Simon, uomo di Sveno
- Piero Gerlini
- George Ardisson as Guntar
- Piero Lulli as Hardak, uomo di Sveno
- Benito Stefanelli as Lorig, amico di Guntar

== Bibliography ==
- Derek Elley. The Epic Film: Myth and History. Routledge, 2013. ISBN 978-0-415-72677-1.
