= I Always Loved You =

1953 film by Mario Costa

- Directed by: Mario Costa
- Written by: Alberto Albani Barbieri; Leonardo Benvenuti; Alessandro Ferraù; Giuseppe Mangione
- Starring: Amedeo Nazzari
- Cinematography: Tonino Delli Colli
- Music by: Carlo Innocenzi
- Distributed by: Variety Distribution
- Release date: 9 December 1953
- Country: Italy
- Language: Italian

I Always Loved You (Italian: Ti ho sempre amato!) is a 1953 Italian melodrama film directed by Mario Costa. It is based on a stage play by Enrico Ragusa.

== Plot ==
A landowner loves a good girl, but is ensnared by another richer woman who is actually aiming for her fortune. This she will be able to temporarily make the two young men go away but the man makes his girlfriend understand that her is true love; he realizes that he has been the victim of a scam and will bring the woman he has always loved to the altar.

== Cast ==
- Amedeo Nazzari as Massimo Alberti
- Myriam Bru as Maria
- Jacques Sernas as Carlo Manfredini
- Adriano Rimoldi as Giorgio
- Tamara Lees as Clara
- Marisa Merlini as Lucia
- Aldo Silvani as Luigi
- Celeste Almieri Calza as Miss Margherita Manfredini
- Margherita Bagni as Sister Margherita
- Cesare Bettarini as Don Antonio
- Aldo Bufi Landi as Mario
- Miranda Campa as Anna
- Vera Carmi as Sister Anna
- Annette Ciarli as Aunt Adelaide
- Rina Franchetti as Assunta
- Aldo Giuffrè as Felice
