= Head of a Tyrant =

- US film poster
- Directed by: Fernando Cerchio
- Written by: Friedrich Hebbel (play); Guido Malatesta; Damiano Damiani; Gian Paolo Callegari; Fernando Cerchio
- Produced by: Piero Ghione
- Starring: Massimo Girotti; Isabelle Corey; Renato Baldini; Yvette Masson
- Cinematography: Pier Ludovico Pavoni
- Edited by: Gianmaria Messeri
- Music by: Carlo Savina
- Production companies: Faro Film; C.F.P.C
- Distributed by: Variety Distribution
- Release date: 26 February 1959
- Running time: 94 minutes
- Countries: France; Italy
- Language: Italy

Head of a Tyrant or Judith and Holofernes (Italian: Giuditta e Oloferne) is a 1959 historical film directed by Fernando Cerchio and starring Massimo Girotti, Isabelle Corey and Renato Baldini.

An Italian-French co-production, it is part of the boom in Sword-and-sandal productions during the late 1950s. The film is based on the story of Judith Beheading Holofernes. A 1929 film Judith and Holofernes was also inspired by the tale.

== Cast ==
- Massimo Girotti as Holophernes
- Isabelle Corey as Judith
- Renato Baldini as Arbar
- Yvette Masson as Rispa
- Gianni Rizzo as Ozia
- Camillo Pilotto as Belial
- Lucia Banti as Servant Girl
- Ricardo Valle as Isaac
- Leonardo Botta as Gabriele
- Franco Balducci as Galaad
- Luigi Tosi as Irasa
- Gabriele Antonini as Brother
- Daniela Rocca as Naomi
- Enzo Doria as Daniel

== See also ==
- Judith of Bethulia (1914)

== Bibliography ==
- Parish, James Robert. Film Directors Guide:Western Europe. Scarecrow Press, 1976.
