= Franco Interlenghi =

Italian actor (1931–2015)

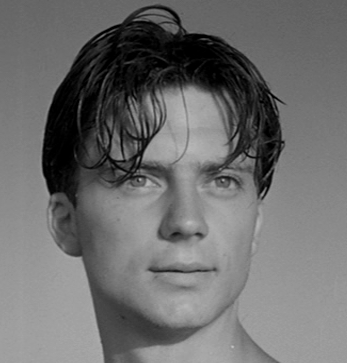
- Interlenghi in the movie Sunday in August (1950)
- Born: 29 October 1931; Rome, Kingdom of Italy
- Died: 10 September 2015 (aged 83); Rome, Italy
- Occupation: Actor
- Years active: 1946–2007
- Spouse: Antonella Lualdi (m. 1955)
- Children: 2

Franco Interlenghi (29 October 1931 – 10 September 2015) was an Italian actor.

He made his acting debut at 15 in Vittorio De Sica's 1946 Neorealist film Sciuscià. He worked with great directors such as Alessandro Blasetti in Fabiola, Roberto Rossellini in Viva l'Italia! and Il generale della Rovere, Federico Fellini in I vitelloni, Michelangelo Antonioni in I vinti, Mauro Bolognini in La notte brava and Luchino Visconti in his stage adaptation of Death of a Salesman. He also appeared in international films, such as Joseph L. Mankiewicz's The Barefoot Contessa, Julien Duvivier's Le petit monde de don Camillo, Charles Vidor's A Farewell to Arms and the Italian-American co-production Ulysses, directed by Mario Camerini.

With his wife, Antonella Lualdi, he had two children, one of whom is actress Antonellina Interlenghi. Franco Interlenghi died on 10 September 2015, aged 83.

== Filmography ==
- Shoeshine (1946) - Pasquale Maggi
- Fabiola (1949) - Corvino
- Sunday in August (1950) - Enrico
- Teresa (1951) - Mario (uncredited)
- Paris Is Always Paris (1951) - Franco Martini
- Little World of Don Camillo (1952) - Mariolino della Bruciata
- Ergastolo (1952) - Stefano Lulli
- The City Stands Trial (1952) - Luigi Esposito
- Sunday Heroes (1952) - Marini
- Giovinezza (1952) - Mario
- Don Lorenzo (1952) - Franco
- The Wayward Wife (1953) - Paolo Sartori
- The World Condemns Them (1953) - Franco
- Riscatto (1953) - Roberto Biasetti
- I Vitelloni (1953) - Moraldo Rubini
- I Vinti (1953) - Claudio
- The Story of William Tell (1953) - Hans
- Cavalcade of Song (1953) - Il notaio
- Mid-Century Loves (1954) - Mario (segment "L'amore romantico")
- 100 Years of Love (1954) - Enrico Adamoli a.k.a. Rico (segment "Garibaldina")
- Half a Century of Song (1954)
- The Barefoot Contessa (1954) - Pedro Vargas
- Ulysses (1954) - Telemachus
- The Two Orphans (1954) - Knight Roger de Vaudrey
- The Lovers of Manon Lescaut (1954) - Enrico des Grieux
- Non c'è amore più grande (1955) - Mario
- Wild Love (1956) - Franco
- Altair (1956) - Farini
- I giorni più belli (1956) - Gianni Valentini
- Toto, Peppino and the Outlaws (1956) - Alberto
- Fathers and Sons (1957) - Guido Blasi
- A Farewell to Arms (1957) - Aymo
- La regina della povera gente (1957)
- La cenicienta y Ernesto (1957) - Ernesto
- Young Husbands (1958) - Antonio
- The Sky Burns (1958) - Ferri
- In Case of Adversity (1958) - Mazzetti
- Educande al tabarin (1958)
- Polikuska (1958) - Pjotr
- Cigarettes, Whiskey and Wild Women (1959)
- Sangue sull'asfalto (1959) - Antonio Pasquali (uncredited)
- General della Rovere (1959) - Antonio Pasquali (uncredited)
- Bad Girls Don't Cry (1959) - Bellabella
- Match contro la morte (1959) - Le gangster
- Le svedesi (1960) - Peppino
- Garibaldi (1961) - Giuseppe Bandi
- Cronache del '22 (1961) - Franco (segment Incontro al mare)
- Una notte per cinque rapine (1967) - Maurice
- The Column (1968) - Optimus - Centurion
- Totò story (1968)
- Pianeta Venere (1972)
- The Left Hand of the Law (1975) - Colombo
- China 9, Liberty 37 (1978) - Hank Sebanek
- Miranda (1985) - Carlo
- Juke box (1985)
- The Professor (1986) - Don Saverio
- The Miser (1989) - Mastro Giacomo
- Pummarò (1989)
- Se non avessi l'amore (1991, TV Movie) - Padre Robotti
- Close Friends (1992) - Tribodi
- L'urlo della verità (1992) - Avvocato Santi (uncredited)
- Gli assassini vanno in coppia (1992)
- Antelope Cobbler (1993)
- Torta di mele (1993)
- Copenhagen fox-trot (1993)
- The Teddy Bear (1994) - Le directeur du musée
- 18.000 giorni fa (1994)
- Le Roi de Paris (1995) - Bellières
- Marciando nel buio (1996) - Sindaco
- Stella's Favor (1996) - Mario
- Racket (1996)
- La rumbera (1998) - Castillo
- Tre addii (1999, TV Movie)
- Padre Pio: Between Heaven and Earth (2000, TV Movie) - Padre Graziano
- Una lunga lunga lunga notte d'amore (2001) - Luigi Settembrini, Marcello's friend
- Il conte di Melissa (2001) - Il Prete
- John XXIII: The Pope of Peace (2002, TV Movie) - Radini Tedeschi
- Due volte Natale (2003)
- The accidental detective (2003) - Nardini
- Tosca e altre due (2003) - Sciarrone
- Romanzo Criminale (2005) - Barone Rosellini
- Nemici per la pelle (2006)
- Notte prima degli esami – Oggi (2007) - Luigi
- I, Don Giovanni (2009) - Padre di Annetta
- La bella società (2010) - Papà di Romolo (final film role)
