= Vacanze a Ischia =

1957 film

- Directed by: Mario Camerini
- Written by: Leo Benvenuti; Mario Camerini; Piero De Bernardi; Pasquale Festa Campanile; Massimo Franciosa
- Cinematography: Otello Martelli
- Music by: Alessandro Cicognini
- Release date: 20 December 1957
- Running time: 105 minute
- Country: Italy
- Language: Italian

Vacanze a Ischia (also known as Holiday Island) is a 1957 Italian comedy film directed by Mario Camerini.

== Plot ==
The lives of several people intersect as they go on vacation to enjoy a pleasant holiday on the island of Ischia. A lawyer spends it in agitation due to thinking he caused the death of a youngster catching coins in the water by the boat. Then you have an engineer who is insulted by four youngsters making an atrocious prank, which makes him suspect that his wife has had a fling and she is with child that is not his. Then the group chases after women for fun, but one of them falls in love with a nurse. There is a Frenchman who comes for a restoration of his marriage but realizes that his wife is being wooed by a young islander.

== Cast ==
- Vittorio De Sica: ingegnere Occhipinti
- Isabelle Corey: Caterina Lisotto
- Antonio Cifariello: Antonio
- Nadia Gray: Carla Occhipinti
- Myriam Bru: Denise Tissot
- Paolo Stoppa: avvocato Appicciato
- Susanne Cramer: Antonietta
- Raf Mattioli: Salvatore
- Peppino De Filippo: Battistella
- Maurizio Arena: Franco
- Bernard Dhéran: Pierre Tissot
- Nino Besozzi: Guido Lucarelli
- Giampiero Littera: Benito
- Hubert von Meyerinck: Colonel Manfredi
- Giuseppe Porelli: Judge
- Guglielmo Inglese: Cancelliere
- Ennio Girolami: Furio
- Marisa Merlini
