= Resurrection (1958 film) =

- German poster
- Directed by: Rolf Hansen
- Written by: Leo Tolstoy (novel); Renato Castellani; Juliane Kay
- Produced by: Hans Abich
- Starring: Horst Buchholz; Myriam Bru; Edith Mill
- Cinematography: Franz Weihmayr
- Edited by: Anna Höllering
- Music by: Mark Lothar
- Production companies: Rizzoli Film; Francinex
- Distributed by: Bavaria Film
- Release date: 21 October 1958
- Running time: 106 minutes
- Countries: Western Germany; Italy; France
- Language: German

Resurrection (German: Auferstehung) is a 1958 historical drama film directed by Rolf Hansen and starring Horst Buchholz, Myriam Bru and Edith Mill. It was made as a co-production between France, Italy and West Germany. It is an adaptation of the 1899 novel Resurrection by Leo Tolstoy. It was shot at the Bavaria Studios in Munich. The film's sets designed by the art director Robert Herlth.

== Cast ==
- Horst Buchholz as Nechljudoff
- Myriam Bru as Katjuschka
- Edith Mill as Fedosia
- Ruth Niehaus as Missy
- Lea Massari as Marja Pawlowna
- Marisa Merlini as Bockowa
- Günther Lüders as Briefträger
- Jean Murat as Gerichtsvorsitzender
- Robert Freitag as Simonson
- Gabrielle Dorziat as Kitajewa
- Til Kiwe as Taras
- Antonio Cifariello as Chenbeck
- Rudolf Rhomberg as Smjelkoff
- Elisabeth Flickenschildt as Agrafena
- Ernst Schröder as Gouverneur
- Lina Carstens as Matrjona
- Alma Seidler as Tante Marja
- Adrienne Gessner as Tante Sonja
- Georg Lehn as Kartinkin
- Ernst Fritz Fürbringer as Oberst
- Gerd Brüdern as Prosecutor
- Roma Bahn as Großfürstin
- Tilla Durieux as Alte
- Hans Magel as Richter
- Marisa Merlini as Bockowa

== Bibliography ==
- Bock, Hans-Michael & Bergfelder, Tim. The Concise CineGraph. Encyclopedia of German Cinema. Berghahn Books, 2009.
