= Liana Ferri =

Italian screenwriter

- Occupations: Actress, Writer
- Years active: 1936-1978 (film)

Liana Ferri was an Italian screenwriter, script supervisor and occasional film actress.

== Selected filmography ==
- Women Without Names (1950)
- The Ungrateful Heart (1951)
- The Seven Deadly Sins (1952)
- The Blind Woman of Sorrento (1952)
- Immortal Melodies (1952)
- The Machine That Kills Bad People (1952)
- Villa Borghese (1953)
- Symphony of Love (1954)
- Appassionatamente (1954)
- The Courier of Moncenisio (1956)
- Love and Troubles (1958)
- The Love Specialist (1958)
- The Assassin (1961)

== Bibliography ==
- Peter Brunette. Roberto Rossellini. University of California Press, 1996.
