= Ergastolo =

1952 film

Ergastolo aka Prison (UK)
- Film poster
- Directed by: Luigi Capuano
- Written by: Luigi Capuano; Armando Curcio
- Produced by: Fortunato Misiano
- Starring: Franco Interlenghi; Sandro Ruffini; Marisa Merlini; Leda Gloria
- Cinematography: Giuseppe La Torre
- Music by: Alberico Vitalini
- Production company: Romana Film
- Distributed by: Romana Film; Siden Film
- Release date: 19 May 1952
- Running time: 90 minutes
- Country: Italy
- Language: Italian

Ergastolo (aka Prison) is a black and white 1952 Italian crime melodrama film directed by Luigi Capuano.

== Plot ==
Rosa Lulli, has an illegitimate 20-year-old son, named Stefano, who lives with her in the house of Professor Arlotta. Stefano is in love with Lydia, the granddaughter of the professor. The couple has a gambling addiction: the need to obtain a large sum to meet gambling debts, which pushes him to accept the loving invitation of Jeannette, owner of a dance school, where Stefano goes to play. But Jeannette is the lover of Pasquale Anitra, head of a criminal gang. When he is killed in Jeannette's home, Stefano is framed and arrested and tried for the murder. Stefano is sentenced to life in prison. Lydia, attending dance school, later hears a conversation in which Jeannette confesses to the murder. She tells the police, but is kidnapped by the criminal gang. During the chase, Jeannette is wounded and before dying, confesses to the authorities. Stefano is freed and marries Lydia.

== Cast ==
- Franco Interlenghi as Stefano Lulli
- Sandro Ruffini as Avvocato Leonardi
- Marisa Merlini as Jeannette
- Leda Gloria as Francesca — Stefano's mother
- Tina Pica as Mrs. De Giorgi
- Hélène Rémy as Lidia
- Ernesto Almirante as The Professor — Lidia's grandfather
- Natale Cirino as Pasquale Amitrano
- Guglielmo Barnabò as Hotel Director
- Bruno Corelli as Gianluigi
- Wilma Montesi uncredited

== Reception ==
The film grossed 223,000,000.00 lire at the box office.
