= The Mongols (film) =

- Italian theatrical release poster
- Directed by: Andre de Toth; Leopoldo Savona
- Written by: Ottavio Alessi; Alessandro Ferraù; Ugo Guerra; Luciano Martino
- Produced by: Guido Giambartolomei
- Starring: Jack Palance; Anita Ekberg
- Cinematography: Aldo Giordani
- Edited by: Otello Colangeli
- Music by: Mario Nascimbene
- Distributed by: Variety Distribution
- Release dates: August 31, 1961 (Italy); September 26, 1962 (United States)
- Running time: 115 minutes (Italy)
- Countries: Italy; France
- Languages: Italian; English

The Mongols (Italian: I mongoli) is a 1961 Italian/French international co-production historical adventure film directed by Andre de Toth, Leopoldo Savona, and Riccardo Freda. The film starred Jack Palance and Anita Ekberg.

== Plot summary ==
In the 13th century, the Mongols are invading Poland. Genghis Khan wants peace with the Poles for now but his eldest son Ogotai (Jack Palance) is eager to continue the war.

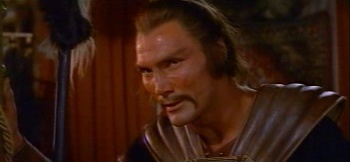
Jack Palance in a scene from the film

== Cast ==
- Jack Palance as Ogatai
- Anita Ekberg as Huluna
- Antonella Lualdi as Amina
- Franco Silva as Stephen of Kraków
- Gianni Garko as Henry of Valois
- Roldano Lupi as Genghis Khan
- Gabriella Pallotta as Lutezia
- Gabriele Antonini as Temugin
- Pierre Cressoy as Igor
- Mario Colli as Boris
- George Wang as Subodai
