= Guido Giambartolomei =

Italian film producer

- Born: 17 July 1921; Rome, Lazio, Italy
- Died: 17 May 2013 (aged 91); Rome, Lazio, Italy
- Occupation: Producer
- Years active: 1953–1966 (film)

Guido Giambartolomei (1921–2013) was an Italian film producer. He was also involved with the running of Rome-based football club S.S. Lazio at one point.

== Selected filmography ==
- The Lovers of Manon Lescaut (1954)
- The Bigamist (1956)
- Doctor and the Healer (1957)
- Fathers and Sons (1957)
- Everyone's in Love (1959)
- The Traffic Policeman (1960)
- The Mongols (1961)
- All the Gold in the World (1961)

== Bibliography ==
- Ann C. Paietta. Saints, Clergy and Other Religious Figures on Film and Television, 1895–2003. McFarland, 2005. ISBN 978-0-7864-2186-2.
