= Marcella Mariani =

Italian actress (1936–1955)

Mariani in The Girls of San Frediano (1954)

Marcella Mariani (8 February 1936 – 13 February 1955) was an Italian actress and Miss Italy contest winner. Though she appeared in several popular movies and was garnering acclaim as an actress, her career was cut short by her death in a 1955 airliner crash.

== Early life and education ==
Marcella Mariani was born in Rome, Italy, on 8 February 1936.

Her first job was working as a cashier at a cinema in Rome, and was chosen as "Miss Cinema Lazio". At the age of 17 Mariani was crowned Miss Italy of 1953 in the Tyrolean resort town of Cortina d'Ampezzo.

== Career ==
After winning the pageant, Mariani began her film career by appearing as herself in the opening segment of producer/director Alfredo Guarini's portmanteau film We, the Women (Siamo donne, 1953). She later attended acting courses at the Experimental Center of Cinematography. She subsequently took on a range of roles and worked with various directors.

Her most significant role was in director Luchino Visconti's 1954 film Senso, in which she worked alongside Alida Valli and Farley Granger, playing the small but important part of Clara, a young prostitute.

Marcella Mariani in Senso (1954)

== Death ==
Her promising career was prematurely ended by her death in a plane crash, which occurred on the slopes of Monte Terminillo, in the province of Rieti, Italy, as she returned from hosting a film festival in Belgium on 13 February 1955. Travelling from Brussels to Rome, the DC-6 passenger liner crashed due to errors made by the crew in poor weather conditions. Heavy wind and snow prevented searchers from reaching the crash site for over a week. All 29 passengers and crew were believed to have died on impact. Mariani, who had turned 19 a few days earlier, was taken to Rome, where she was buried.

== Filmography ==
- Cavalcade of Song (1953, directed by Domenico Paolella)
- We, the Women (Siamo donne, aka Of Life and Love) (1953, directed by Alfredo Guarini)
- It Happened in the Park (1953, directed by Gianni Franciolini) as Marcella (uncredited)
- Senso (1954, directed by Luchino Visconti) as Clara, la prostituta<
- If You Won a Hundred Million (1954, directed by Carlo Campogalliani and Carlo Moscovini) (uncredited)
- Women and Soldiers (1954, directed by Luigi Malerba and Antonio Marchi)
- The Mysterious Singer (1955, directed by Marino Girolami) as Marina
- The Girls of San Frediano (1955, directed by Valerio Zurlini) as Gina
- I'll Never Forget (1956, directed by Giuseppe Guarino) as Camilla (final film role)
