= Francinex =

French film company

company logo

Francinex was a French film production and distribution company active from the 1930s to the 1960s. It had its roots in Italian production interests before the Second World War, who were able to continue during the conflict due to film agreements between Mussolini's Italy and Vichy France. The company was part of the Filmsonor-Cinedis group, but then passed under the direct control of the Italian producer Angelo Rizzoli in 1951. It was involved in many post-war co-productions with Italy including the popular Don Camillo series as well as the Fellini films Boccaccio '70 (1962) and 8½ (1963).

== Selected filmography ==
- Happy Arenas (1935)
- Final Accord (1938)
- Abandonment (1940)
- The Daughter of the Green Pirate (1942)
- Strange Inheritance (1943)
- Night Shift (1944)
- A Friend Will Come Tonight (1946)
- The White Devil (1947)
- Eternal Conflict (1948)
- Man with the Grey Glove (1948)
- Monelle (1948)
- A Change in the Wind (1949)
- Between Eleven and Midnight (1949)
- The Walls of Malapaga (1949)
- Two Pennies Worth of Violets (1951)
- The Cape of Hope (1951)
- Little World of Don Camillo (1952)
- The Three Thieves (1952)
- Article 519, Penal Code (1952)
- Lucrèce Borgia (1953)
- What Scoundrels Men Are! (1953)
- The Return of Don Camillo (1953)
- Journey to Italy (1954)
- The Two Orphans (1954)
- Madame du Barry (1954)
- Marianne of My Youth (1955)
- The Lovers of Manon Lescaut (1955)
- If All the Guys in the World (1955)
- Spring, Autumn and Love (1955)
- Napoléon (1955)
- Dreams in a Drawer (1957)
- Doctor and the Healer (1957)
- Resurrection (1958)
- Shoot the Piano Player (1960)
- Garibaldi (1961)
- Boccaccio '70 (1962)
- 8½ (1963)

== Bibliography ==
- Alpert, Hollis. Fellini. Simon and Schuster, 2000.
- Crisp, C.G. The Classic French Cinema, 1930-1960. Indiana University Press, 1993
- Nicoli, Marina. The Rise and Fall of the Italian Film Industry. Taylor & Francis, 2016.
- Small, Pauline. Sophia Loren: Moulding the Star. Intellect Books, 2009.
