= 100 Years of Love =

1954 film

- DVD cover
- Directed by: Lionello De Felice
- Produced by: Carlo De Felice
- Cinematography: Aldo Tonti
- Edited by: Mario Serandrei
- Music by: Mario Nascimbene; Nino Rota; Teo Usuelli
- Production company: Società Italiana Cines
- Distributed by: Diana Cinematografica
- Release date: 25 February 1954
- Running time: 120 minutes
- Country: Italy
- Language: Italian

100 Years of Love (Italian: Cento anni d'amore) is a 1954 Italian anthology film directed by Lionello De Felice. It stars actor Gabriele Ferzetti.

It was shot at Cinecittà Studios in Rome. The film's sets were designed by the art director Franco Lolli.

== Cast ==
=== Garibaldina ===
- Aldo Fabrizi as Don Pietro
- Irène Galter as Maria
- Franco Interlenghi as Rico
- Carlo Ninchi as sottufficiale garibaldino
- Nietta Zocchi as Nunziata
- Turi Pandolfini as veterinario di Monterotondo
- Nico Pepe as ufficiale delle truppe papali
- Oscar Andriani as comandante dei garibaldini

=== Pendolin ===
- Vittorio De Sica as Duke Giovanni Del Bagno
- Nadia Gray as Muriella di Lucoli
- Carlo Campanini as Pendolin
- Luigi Cimara as Ubaldo di Lucoli
- Margherita Bossi Nicosia as Miss Adele
- Eduardo Passarelli as direttore della lotteria di beneficenza
- Franco Scandurra as amico del duca
- Alberto Plebani as Gaspare

=== Purificazione ===
- Eduardo De Filippo as Vincenzo Pagliero
- Angiola Faranda as Ester Fiorelli
- Titina De Filippo as Aunt Matilde
- Giulietta Masina as dirimpettaia

=== Nozze d'oro ===
- Rina Morelli as Maria Boggi
- Ernesto Almirante as Antonio Bianchi
- Virgilio Riento as commissario di P.S.
- Nino Pavese as doganiere

=== Gli ultimi dieci minuti ===
- Gabriele Ferzetti as Carlo
- Myriam Bru as Anna

=== Amore 1954 ===
- Maurice Chevalier as Massimo
- Alba Arnova as Lucia
- Jacques Sernas as Roberto
- Xenia Valderi as Margaret
- Laura Gore as amica di Lucia
- Ferdinando Cappabianca as Sergio
- Emilio Petacci as Vincenzo
