= Il carro armato dell'8 settembre =

1960 film

- Directed by: Gianni Puccini
- Written by: Elio Petri; Rodolfo Sonego; Gianni Puccini; Tonino Guerra; Pier Paolo Pasolini; Elio Bartolini; Goffredo Parise; Giulio Questi
- Cinematography: Silvano Ippoliti
- Music by: Armando Trovajoli
- Release date: 1960
- Country: Italy
- Language: Italian

Il carro armato dell'8 settembre is a 1960 Italian film. It stars actor Gabriele Ferzetti.

== Cast ==
- Gabriele Ferzetti: Tommaso
- Elsa Martinelli: Mirella
- Dorian Gray: soubrette
- Marisa Merlini: Palmira
- Yvonne Furneaux
- Mario Valdemarin
- Catherine Spaak
- Giacomo Furia
- Tiberio Murgia
- Romolo Valli
- Loris Gizzi
- Francesco Mulè
- Jean-Marc Bory: Carlo
- Bice Valori
- Antonio De Teffè
- Franca Dominici

Database of the documents produced by the Committee for the Theatrical Review of The Italian Ministry of Cultural Heritage and Activities, from 1944 to 2000.
