= What Scoundrels Men Are! (1953 film) =

1953 film

- Directed by: Glauco Pellegrini
- Written by: Leonardo Benvenuti; Agenore Incrocci; Glauco Pellegrini; Furio Scarpelli
- Starring: Walter Chiari; Antonella Lualdi; Myriam Bru
- Cinematography: Carlo Montuori
- Music by: Nino Rota
- Production companies: Francinex; Rizzoli Film
- Distributed by: Columbia Film
- Release date: 1953
- Running time: 95 minutes
- Country: Italy
- Language: Italian

What Scoundrels Men Are! (Italian: Gli uomini, che mascalzoni!) is a 1953 Italian comedy film directed by Glauco Pellegrini and starring Walter Chiari, Antonella Lualdi and Myriam Bru. It is a remake of the 1932 film of the same title starring Vittorio De Sica.

== Plot ==
Elsa is a rich and mature widow and has two children, Franca and Giorgetto. Bruno is at her service as a driver. Both the mother and the daughter enter into sympathy with the young driver, whom he thinks of both as possible wives, but he cannot make up his own mind. Then there is Gina, the owner of a garage, who is about to separate from her husband. Together with Giorgetto, Bruno then finds himself following another girl, a shop assistant at the Rinascente. Mariuccia, this is her name, is a poor and serious girl: Bruno tries a little for fun, a little to challenge Giorgetto, who had not managed to conquer her, but ends up falling in love with her and marrying her. He will become a street driver, like her father.

== Cast ==
- Walter Chiari as Bruno
- Antonella Lualdi as Mariuccia
- Myriam Bru as Franca
- Julien Carette as Padre di mariuccia
- Marie Glory as Elsa
- Jone Salinas as Gina
- Silvio Bagolini as Lello
- Paola Borboni as madre di Bruno
- Renato Salvatori as Carletto
- Lola Braccini as owner of boarding house

== Bibliography ==
- Bayman, Louis (ed.) Directory of World Cinema: Italy. Intellect Books, 2011.
