= Lionello De Felice =

Italian film director and screenwriter

- Born: 9 September 1916; Montoro Inferiore, Italy
- Died: 14 December 1989 (aged 73); Rome, Italy
- Occupations: Screenwriter, director

Lionello De Felice (9 September 1916 – 14 December 1989) was an Italian screenwriter and film director.

== Life and career ==
Born in Montoro Inferiore, De Felice was the son of a lawyer and a Baroness. After spending several years in Naples, he moved to Rome, where he graduated in law. After studying at the Centro Sperimentale di Cinematografia, De Felice started his career as an assistant director of Alessandro Blasetti.

In 1951, De Felice made his directorial debut with Without a Flag. After directing some critically well-received films, in the 1960s he specialized as a screenwriter of sword-and-sandal films. He retired at the end of the decade, his last work being the second unit direction of Blasetti's Simón Bolívar. He died on 14 December 1989, at the age of 73.

== Selected filmography ==
Director and screenwriter

- Without a Flag (1951)
- Il romanzo della mia vita (1952)
- 100 Years of Love (1953)
- Too Young for Love (1953)
- The Three Thieves (1954)
- Desperate Farewell (1955)
- Constantine and the Cross (1961)

Screenwriter

- The Knights of the Black Masks (1947)
- Fabiola (1949)
- The Force of Destiny (1950)
- Sunday Heroes (1952)
- Venus Against the Son of Hercules (1962)
- Colossus of the Arena (1962)
- Goliath and the Sins of Babylon (1963)
- 3 Avengers (1964)
- La vendetta di Spartacus (1964)
- Seven Rebel Gladiators (1965)
- Countdown to Doomsday (1967)
