= Women and Soldiers =

- Directed by: Luigi Malerba; Antonio Marchi
- Written by: Attilio Bertolucci; Marco Ferreri; Luigi Malerba; Antonio Marchi
- Produced by: Luciana Momigliano
- Starring: Marcella Mariani; Sandro Somarè; Marco Ferreri
- Cinematography: Gianni Di Venanzo
- Music by: Teo Uselli
- Production company: SIC Momigliano
- Release date: 1954
- Running time: 94 minutes
- Country: Italy
- Language: Italian

Women and Soldiers (Italian: Donne e soldati) is a 1954 Italian historical adventure film directed by Luigi Malerba and Antonio Marchi and starring Marcella Mariani, Sandro Somarè and Marco Ferreri. It is set during the Medieval era during a siege of a city in Emilia. Location shooting took place at Montechiarugolo and Torrechiara.

== Cast ==
- Marcella Mariani as Margherita
- Sandro Somarè as Storyteller
- Marco Ferreri as Landlord
- Gaia Servadio
- Anna Albertelli
- Enrico Magretti

== Bibliography ==
- Chiti, Roberto & Poppi, Roberto. Dizionario del cinema italiano: Dal 1945 al 1959. Gremese Editore, 1991.
