= Narciso Parigi =

Italian singer and actor (1927–2020)

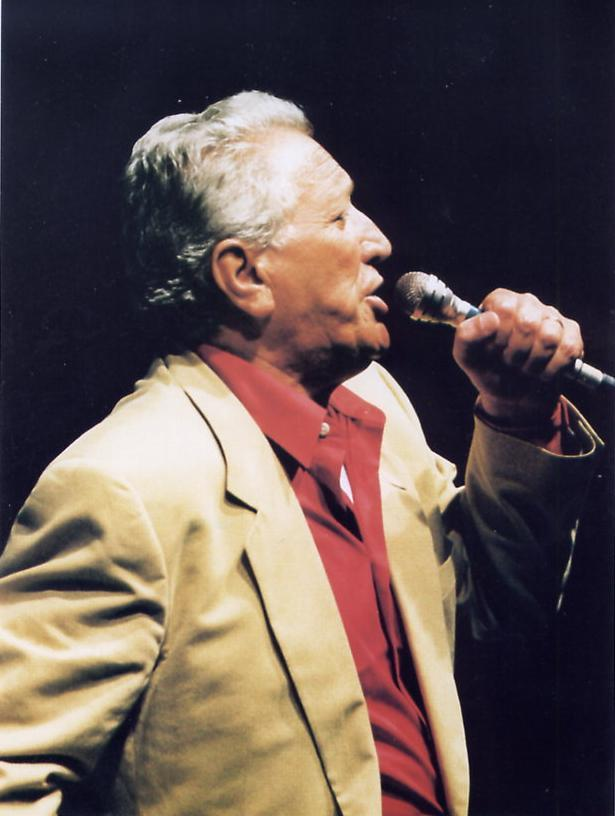
- Born: 29 November 1927; Campi Bisenzio, Tuscany, Kingdom of Italy
- Died: 25 January 2020 (aged 92); Florence, Tuscany, Italy
- Occupations: Actor; singer

Narciso Parigi (29 November 1927 – 25 January 2020) was an Italian actor and singer.

== Biography ==
Parigi was born in 1927 in Tuscany. He made his debut at Radio Firenze in 1944 as a "radio singer" with different orchestras. He worked with Radio Firenze from 1945 to 1965.

He participated in the Festival di Napoli in 1963 with Nunzio Gallo. He sang the song Annamaria.

Parigi was also active in the United States. He participated in Italian television programs such as Ci vediamo in TV and Mezzogiorno in famiglia. On 29 November 2017, his 90th birthday, Parigi was given the Fiorino d'oro (Golden florin) by the City of Florence for his musical contributions.

Narciso Parigi died on 25 January 2020.

== Filmography ==
- Terra straniera (1952)
- La prigioniera di Amalfi (1954)
- Acque amare (1954)
- Baracca e burattini (1954)
- Assi alla ribalta (1954)
- Ricordami (1955)
- La porta dei sogni (1955)
- La catena dell'odio (1955)
- I vagabondi delle stelle (1956)
- Amarti è il mio destino (1957)
- Gagliardi e pupe (1958)
- Good bye Firenze – Arrivederci Firenze (1958)
- Napoleone a Firenze (1963)
- Anche i ladri hanno un santo (1981)
- I laureati (1995)
- Uscio e Bottega (2004)
