= Spring Song =

Spring Song or Spring Songs may refer to:

== Film ==
- Spring Song (1944 film), a Czech film
- Spring Song (1946 film), a British drama film
- Spring Song (1954 film), a German-Italian drama film
- Fate/stay night: Heaven's Feel III. spring song, a 2020 Japanese anime film

== Music ==
- "Spring Song," common name for the Song Without Words, Opus 62 No.6 in A major, or Frühlingslied by Felix Mendelssohn
- Spring Song (Sibelius), an 1894 orchestral piece by Jean Sibelius
- Spring Songs, 1981 cycle of songs by William Doppmann
- Spring Songs (EP), by Title Fight
- "Spring Song", a song by Gryphon from the album Treason
