= The Lovers of Manon Lescaut =

- French film poster
- Directed by: Mario Costa
- Written by: Mario Costa; Tullio Pinelli; Jacques Sigurd; Alberto Albani Barbieri; Giuseppe Zucca
- Based on: Manon Lescaut by Abbé Prévost
- Produced by: Guido Giambartolomei; Carlo Salsano
- Starring: Myriam Bru; Franco Interlenghi; Roger Pigaut
- Cinematography: Anchise Brizzi
- Edited by: Otello Colangeli
- Music by: Renzo Rossellini
- Production companies: Francinex; Rizzoli Film; Royal Film
- Distributed by: Les Films Fernand Rivers; Dear Film
- Release dates: 28 December 1954 (Italy); 2 November 1955 (France)
- Running time: 90 minutes
- Countries: France; Italy
- Language: Italian

The Lovers of Manon Lescaut (Italian: Gli amori di Manon Lescaut) is a 1954 French-Italian historical melodrama film directed by Mario Costa and starring Myriam Bru, Franco Interlenghi and Roger Pigaut. It is based on the 1731 novel Manon Lescaut by Antoine François Prévost, which has been made into films on a number of occasions.

The film's sets were designed by Giancarlo Bartolini Salimbeni.

== Cast ==
- Myriam Bru as Manon Lescaut
- Franco Interlenghi as Enrico des Grieux
- Roger Pigaut as Lescaut
- Aldo Silvani as Conte des Grieux
- Marisa Merlini as Elisa
- Nerio Bernardi as Barone de Forté
- Luigi Pavese as Il mercante premuroso
- Paolo Poli as Tiberge
- Lily Granado as Adriana
- Lia Reiner as Affitacamere
- Franco Scandurra as Chatodoux
- Georges Bréhat as Il barone giocatore
- Olga Solbelli as La suora nel carcere
- Nico Pepe as Il gioielliere
- Ugo Sasso as Un gendarme
- Peter Trent as Conte di Loisy
- Franco Pesce as Giovanni
- Ileana Lauro
- Lia Lena
- Nada Cortese
- Hedda Linton
- Pino Sciacqua
- Luigi Tosi
- Louis Seigner as Duca di Forchamps
- Jacques Castelot as Marchese de Boysson

== Bibliography ==
- Goble, Alan. The Complete Index to Literary Sources in Film. Walter de Gruyter, 1999.
