= Marisa Merlini =

Italian actress (1923–2008)

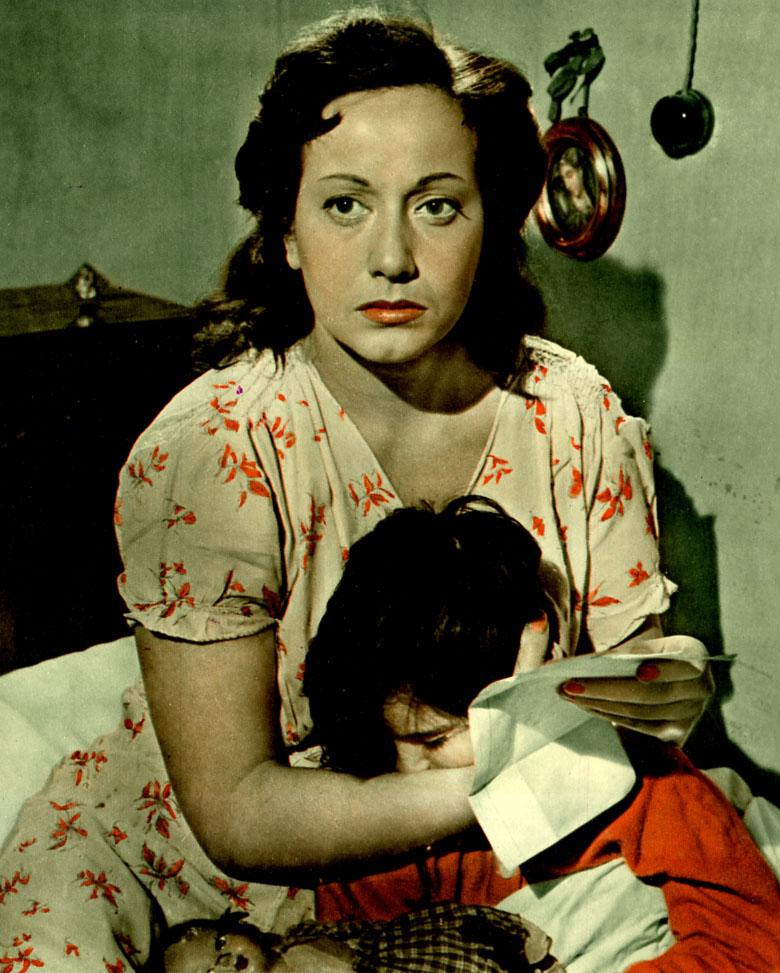
- Merlini in the movie Tormento d'anime (1953)
- Born: 6 August 1923; Rome, Kingdom of Italy
- Died: 27 July 2008 (aged 84); Rome, Italy
- Occupation: Actress

Marisa Merlini (6 August 1923 – 27 July 2008) was an Italian character actress active in Italy's post-World War II cinema. Merlini appeared in over fifty films during her career, which spanned from World War II to 2005. In Luigi Comencini's 1953 film Pane, amore e fantasia, she portrayed Annarella, a village midwife, who marries the local police marshal, played by Vittorio De Sica.

== Biography ==
A native of Rome, where she was born on 6 August 1923, Merlini was well known for playing the romana verace, or "born-and-bred Roman" characters. Merlini also appeared in several high-profile comedic films alongside Italian actor, Totò, as well as the 1960 film Il vigile with actor Alberto Sordi. Additionally, Merlini appeared in a number of films opposite her real life friend, Italian actress Anna Magnani.

Merlini's awards included the Nastro d'Argento (Silver Ribbon), a film critics' award in 1957 for portraying a tourist in the 1956 Antonio Racioppi directed film, Tempo di Villeggiatura.

Merlini's last appearance on screen came in the 2005 film, La seconda notte di nozze, which was directed by Pupi Avati.

Marisa Merlini died in Rome, on 27 July 2008, at the age of 84. Director Pupi Avati, who directed Merlini's final 2005 film, La seconda notte di nozze, paid tribute to Merlini saying, "Marisa brought to the set the experience of somebody who had taken part in the golden years of Italian cinema, but she was down-to-earth both in front of and behind the camera... Working with her was an honour and a fantastic experience."

== Filmography ==
- Nothing New Tonight (1942) - Un ospite dell'istituto
- Rome, Free City (1946) - Mara
- Toto Looks for a House (1949) - Patronessa
- The Emperor of Capri (1949) - La baronesa von Krapfen
- Marechiaro (1949) - Un'invitata al pranzo di nozze
- Se fossi deputato (1949) - Olga Olghis
- Vivere a sbafo (1949)
- Love and Poison (1950) - Orsola
- Toto Looks for a Wife (1950) - Luisa, la modella
- Lo Zappatore (1950)
- The Black Captain (1951) - Lucrezia Adinolfi
- Rome-Paris-Rome (1951) - Signora nel vagone letto
- Stasera sciopero (1951) - Gemma
- Napoleon (1951) - Giuseppina Beauharnais
- The Two Sergeants (1951)
- Viva il cinema! (1952) - Jacqueline
- I'm the Hero (1952) - Lucille
- The Passaguai Family Gets Rich (1952) - La contessa
- Ergastolo (1952) - Jeannette
- In Olden Days (1952) - La signora nell'auto scoperta
- The Angels of the District (1952) - Gianna
- Sunday Heroes (1952) - Lucy - Cerchio's wife
- I, Hamlet (1952) - Regina Gertrud
- Il tallone d'Achille (1952) - Zizì
- Er fattaccio (1952) - Lulù
- Cats and Dogs (1952) - Donna Filomena
- Infame accusa (1953) - Amante di Giovannino
- I Always Loved You (1953) - Lucia
- Bread, Love and Dreams (1953) - Anna Mirziato
- Viva il cinema! (1953)
- Tormento d'anime (1953)
- Sua Altezza ha detto: no! (1953) - Liubitza
- Finalmente libero! (1953) - Woman in the Court
- Anna perdonami (1953)
- La prigioniera di Amalfi (1954)
- Bread, Love and Jealousy (1954) - La levatrice
- The Lovers of Manon Lescaut (1954) - Elisa
- Due lacrime (1954) - Valeria
- Di qua, di là del Piave (1954)
- Le signorine dello 04 (1955) - Vera Colasanti
- The Song of the Heart (1955) - Silvia
- Destination Piovarolo (1955) - Sara
- Cortile (1955)
- Il bigamo (1956) - Enza Masetti
- Tempo di villeggiatura (1956) - Margherita Pozzi
- Porta un bacione a Firenze (1956) - Sig.ra Rosa
- Padri e figli (1957) - Ines Santarelli
- The Most Wonderful Moment (1957) - Margherita Rosati
- Nature Girl and the Slaver (1957) - Schwester
- Doctor and the Healer (1957) - Mafalda
- Husbands in the City (1957) - Aida
- Vacanze a Ischia (1957)
- Dinanzi a noi il cielo (1957) - Madre di Tom
- Ladro lui, ladra lei (1958) - Marialele
- Io, mammeta e tu (1958) - Donna Amalia, la madre
- Resurrection (1958) - Bockowa
- Il bacio del sole (Don Vesuvio) (1958) - Carmela Spada
- Everyone's in Love (1959) - Jolanda
- World of Miracles (1959) - Franca
- La cento chilometri (1959) - Angela
- Juke box urli d'amore (1959) - Marisa Loreto
- Roulotte e roulotte (1959) - Anna
- I piaceri dello scapolo (1960) - Evelina
- Il carro armato dell'8 settembre (1960) - Palmira
- La garçonnière (1960) - Pupa
- Il vigile (1960) - Amalia Celletti
- Ferragosto in bikini (1960) - Marta
- Le ambiziose (1961) - La signora Letizia Proietti
- World in My Pocket (1961) - Frau Mandini
- Gli incensurati (1961) - Olimpia
- Akiko (1961) - Ottavia Colasanto
- Il giudizio universale (1961) - Mother of tomato-throwing child
- His Women (1961) - Amalia
- Mariti a congresso (1961)
- Fra' Manisco cerca guai (1961) - Carmela
- Nerone '71 (1962)
- La Vendetta (1962) - La postière
- Colpo gobbo all'italiana (1962) as Nunziata
- Le massaggiatrici (1962) - Bice Petroni
- Destination Rome (1963) - Pia
- I mostri (1963) - Paola Fioravanti (segment "Testimone volontario")
- La chica del trébol (1963)
- Crucero de verano (1964) - Carolina
- Ragazza in prestito (1964) - Regina
- Squillo (1964)
- Loca juventud (1965) - Madre de Johnny
- La fabbrica dei soldi (1965) - Ermelina
- Les combinards (1966) - Rosaria
- Io, io, io... e gli altri (1966) - Lady on the telephone
- The Peking Medallion (1967) - Madame Vulcano
- All Mad About Him (1967) - Allegra
- Gli altri, gli altri... e noi (1967)
- Donne, botte e bersaglieri (1968) - Mrs Jole
- Il grande silenzio (1968) - Regina
- Lisa dagli occhi blu (1970) - Moglie del Telegrafista
- Dramma della gelosia – Tutti i particolari in cronaca (1970) - Silvana Ciafrocchi
- Ninì Tirabusciò: la donna che inventò la mossa (1970) - Ciccio's Assistant / Arab Dancer
- Mio padre Monsignore (1971) - Tosca
- Do Not Commit Adultery (1972) - Maria Teresa's mother
- Continuavano a chiamarli i due piloti più matti del mondo (1972) - Signora Cesire
- Il maschio ruspante (1972) - Mother Giustina / Marcella - the prostitute
- A pugni nudi (1974) - Amalia, Paolo's Mother
- L'albero dalle foglie rosa (1974)
- Les bidasses s'en vont en guerre (1974) - Paulette Brugnon
- Le dolci zie (1975) - Fiorella
- Oh, Serafina! (1976) - Belinda Valle
- Stangata in famiglia (1976) - Aida
- Batton Story (1976) - Zaira
- La Bidonata (1977) - Maria
- La mazzetta (1978) - Elena Miletti
- Una bella governante di colore (1978) - Aspasia - wife of Nicola
- La moglie in vacanza... l'amante in città (1980) - Valeria's Mother
- L'altra donna (1980) - Olga's Mother
- Mia moglie torna a scuola (1980) - La preside
- L'onorevole con l'amante sotto il letto (1981) - Virginia Battistoni
- Cornetti alla crema (1981) - Zaira, Marianna's Mother
- Pierino contro tutti (1981) - La chiromante
- Il tifoso, l'arbitro e il calciatore (1982) - Mother of Manuela
- Storia d'amore e d'amicizia (1982, TV Mini-Series) - Garibalda
- Gian Burrasca (1982) - Zia Bettina
- Sfrattato cerca casa equo canone (1983) - Moglie di Maciste
- Arrivano i miei (1983)
- Crazy Underwear (1992) - Aunt of Alessia
- Ricky & Barabba (1992) - Barabba's mother
- A Dio piacendo (1995) - Ileana
- Stella's Favor (1996) - Amelia
- Vacanze sulla neve (1999) - Countess Eloisa
- Pazzo d'amore(1999)
- Le ali della vita (2000, TV Movie) - Sorella Adele
- Teste di cocco (2000) - Nonna
- Reisei to jônetsu no aida (2001) - Gina
- Le ali della vita 2 (2003, TV Movie)
- La seconda notte di nozze (2005) - Eugenia Ricci
