= Luisa Rivelli =

Italian film actress (1931–2013)

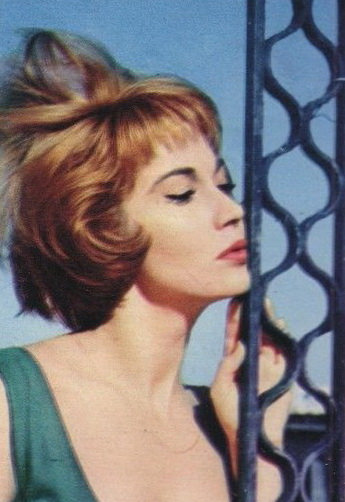
- Born: 10 February 1931; Ternate, Kingdom of Italy
- Died: 12 June 2013 (aged 82); Guidonia Montecelio, Italy
- Occupation: Actress
- Years active: 1943–1994

Luisa Rivelli (10 February 1931 – 12 June 2013) was an Italian film actress. She appeared in 50 films between 1951 and 1994.

Rivelli died in Guidonia Montecelio on 12 June 2013, at the age of 82.

== Selected filmography ==
- La figlia del diavolo (1952)
- They Were Three Hundred (1952)
- Passionate Song (1953)
- It's Never Too Late (1953)
- The Rival (1956)
- Supreme Confession (1956)
- The Law (1959)
- Treasure of the Petrified Forest (1965)
- Lightning Bolt (1965)
- Me, Me, Me... and the Others (1966)
- The Big Gundown (1966)
- Rough Justice (1970)
