= Myriam Bru =

French actress (born 1930)

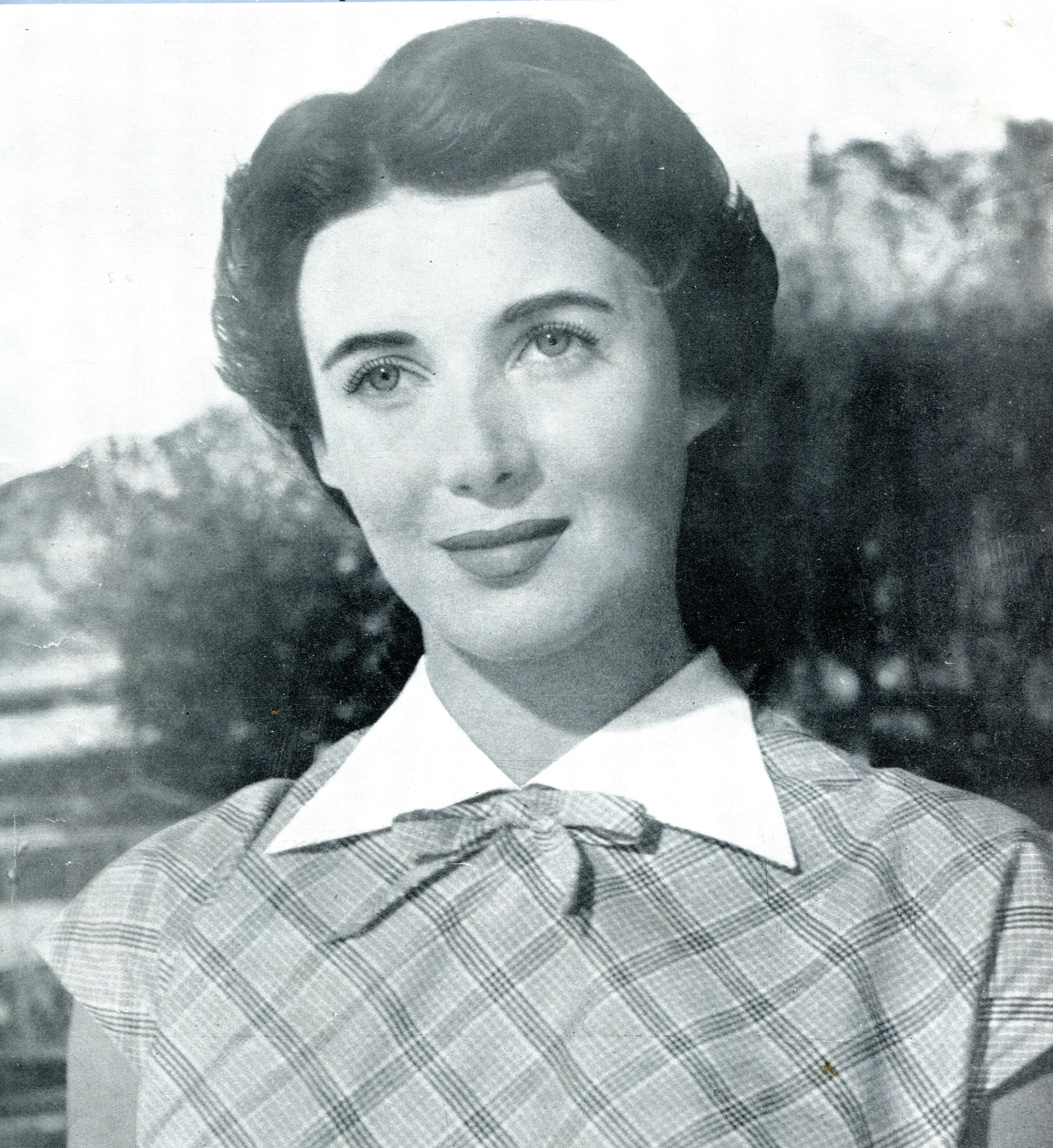
- Myriam Bru in Ti ho sempre amato (1953)
- Born: 20 April 1930 (age 96); Paris, France
- Years active: 1949–1958
- Spouse: Horst Buchholz (m. 1958–2003)
- Children: Beatrice Buchholz; Christopher Buchholz

Myriam Bru (born 20 April 1930, Paris) is a French retired actress and the wife of German actor Horst Buchholz, to whom she was married from 1958 until his death in 2003. She appeared in 16 films between 1952 and her marriage in 1958, when she retired from acting to raise her two children, one of whom is German actor Christopher Buchholz.

After a small uncredited role in Jacques Becker's Rendezvous in July (1949), she had her first credited role in Richard Pottier's crime story Ouvert contre X (The Case Against X) (1952). Later the same year, she made her first Italian film, Gian Paolo Callegari's debut film as director: Eran trecento… (They Were 300). The following years, she appeared in a number of Italian films, including two of Carmine Gallone's films about famous composers, Puccini (1953) and Casa Ricordi (1954), and Mario Camerini's Vacanze a Ischia (1957), where she played opposite director Vittorio De Sica.

In 1957, she went to Germany to do her first German film for veteran director Rolf Hansen: Resurrection (based on Leo Tolstoy's novel Resurrection). On the set she met the German heartthrob Horst Buchholz, and the following year they married in London. Her last film, made shortly before she married, was Renato Castellani's prison film ...And the Wild Wild Women, in which she played a female prisoner.

Later in life, after her children were grown up, she became a theatrical agent in Paris.

== Partial filmography ==
- The Case Against X (1952)
- They Were Three Hundred (1952)
- Puccini (1953)
- I Always Loved You (1953)
- What Scoundrels Men Are! (1953)
- The Two Orphans (1954)
- House of Ricordi (1954)
- The Lovers of Manon Lescaut (1954)
- Of Life and Love (1954)
- 100 Years of Love (1954)
- Appassionatamente (1954)
- Il padrone sono me (1955)
- Holiday Island (1957)
- Resurrection (1958)
