= Pietà per chi cade =

- Directed by: Mario Costa
- Screenplay by: Tullio Pinelli; Angelo Alessandro; Anton Giulio Majano; Mario Costa; Alberto Albani Barbieri
- Story by: Anton Giulio Majano; Domenico Meccoli
- Starring: Amedeo Nazzari; Antonella Lualdi; Nadia Gray
- Cinematography: Anchise Brizzi
- Music by: Carlo Rustichelli
- Distributed by: Variety Distribution
- Release date: 17 March 1954
- Language: Italian

Pietà per chi cade (i. e. Compassion for those who fall) is a 1954 Italian melodrama film written and directed by Mario Costa and starring Amedeo Nazzari, Antonella Lualdi and Nadia Gray.

== Cast ==
- Amedeo Nazzari as Carlo
- Antonella Lualdi as Bianca
- Nadia Gray as Anna
- Lída Baarová as Aunt Eugenia
- Andrea Checchi as Andrea
- Massimo Serato as Livio
- Emilio Cigoli as Marsi
- Lia Rainer as Gianna
- Carlo D'Angelo as Lawyer
- Cesare Fantoni as Prosecutor
- Carlo Tamberlani as Judge
- Miranda Campa
- Lucia Banti
