= The Three Thieves =

1954 comedy film

- Directed by: Lionello De Felice
- Written by: Umberto Notari (novel); Franco Brusati; Félicien Marceau; Filippo Sanjust
- Produced by: Jacopo Comin
- Starring: Totò; Jean-Claude Pascal; Simone Simon
- Cinematography: Romolo Garroni
- Edited by: Mario Serandrei
- Music by: Roman Vlad
- Production companies: Francinex; Franco London Films; Rizzoli Film
- Distributed by: Dear Film
- Release date: 8 October 1954
- Running time: 100 minutes
- Countries: Italy; France
- Language: Italian

The Three Thieves (Italian: I tre ladri) is a 1954 Italian-French comedy film directed by Lionello De Felice and starring Totò, Jean-Claude Pascal and Simone Simon.

== Cast ==
- Totò as Tapioca
- Jean-Claude Pascal as Gastone Cascarilla
- Simone Simon as Doris Ornano
- Gino Bramieri as Edmondo Ornano
- Giovanna Ralli as Marietta Rossi
- Memmo Carotenuto as Battista
- Mario Castellani as Ornano's Lawyer
- Lauro Gazzolo as The Prosecutor
- Camillo Pilotto as The Presiding Judge
- Pina Renzi as Aida
- Virgilio Riento as Commissario Zanini
- Carlo Sposito as Michele
- Laura Gore as Doris' Friend
- Salvo Libassi
- Achille Majeroni as The Old Financier
- Turi Pandolfini as Leonardo da Vinci - the inventor
- Nico Pepe as The Tall Financier
- Giorgio De Reilly
- Bice Valori as Amica di Doris
- Adriana Bisaccia
- Susanne Lévesy
- Nino Milano
- Renato Navarrini
- Claudio Ermelli as Tapioca's Defender
- Loris Gizzi as Man soliciting funds from Tapioca

== Bibliography ==
- Ennio Bìspuri. Totò: principe clown : tutti i film di Totò. Guida Editori, 1997.
