= Garibaldi (film) =

1961 film by Roberto Rossellini

Garibaldi -Viva l'Italia!-
- Directed by: Roberto Rossellini
- Written by: Sergio Amidei; Luigi Chiarini; Roberto Rossellini
- Produced by: Oscar Brazzi
- Starring: Renzo Ricci; Paolo Stoppa; Tina Louise
- Cinematography: Luciano Trasatti
- Edited by: Roberto Cinquini
- Music by: Renzo Rossellini
- Production companies: Francinex; Galatea Film; Tempo Film
- Distributed by: Cineriz
- Release date: 2 February 1961 (Italy)
- Running time: 106 minutes 138 minutes (director's cut)
- Countries: Italy; France
- Language: Italian

Garibaldi, the English title of the film originally released as Viva l'Italia!, is a 1961 Italian drama film directed by Roberto Rossellini.

== Synopsis ==
The film shows how Italy's historic national hero Giuseppe Garibaldi leads a military campaign known as the Expedition of the Thousand in 1860 and conquers Sicily and Naples. When the Bourbon monarchy has left Southern Italy, he supports Victor Emmanuel II of Italy who achieves a lasting unification under the aegis of the House of Savoy.

== Background ==
Roberto Rossellini stated he was more proud of this film than of any other film he ever made.
