= The Courier of Moncenisio (1954 film) =

1954 film

- Film poster
- Directed by: Guido Brignone
- Written by: Jean Bouchardy (novel); Liana Ferri; Ivo Perilli; Guido Brignone
- Produced by: Alberto Manca
- Starring: Roldano Lupi; Virna Lisi; Arnoldo Foà; Jean Chevrier
- Cinematography: Romolo Garroni
- Edited by: Jolanda Benvenuti
- Music by: Carlo Innocenzi
- Production company: Radius Productions
- Distributed by: Variety Distribution
- Release date: 30 December 1954 (Italy)
- Running time: 88 minutes
- Country: Italy
- Language: Italian

The Courier of Moncenisio (Italian: Il vetturale del Moncenisio) is a 1954 Italian historical melodrama film directed by Guido Brignone and starring Roldano Lupi, Virna Lisi and Arnoldo Foà. It is the last of three film adaptation of the 1852 novel Jean le Coucher by Jean Bouchardy.

== Plot ==
Nineteenth century. A woman, believing she has been widowed by her carrier husband, remarries a noble. He is actually plotting to get hold of a large inheritance, but he gets caught and kills himself. At this point, the woman's first husband, believed dead, reappears and rejoins the family.

== Cast ==
- Roldano Lupi as Jean Claude Thibaud
- Virna Lisi as Jeanne Thibaud, figlia di Jean Claude
- Arnoldo Foà as conte di Brissac
- Jean Chevrier as Colonnello napoleonico
- Rosario Borelli as Henri Roger
- Georges Bréhat as Morel
- Elisa Cegani
- Anita Durante
- Checco Durante
- Enrica Dyrell
- Luciano Fatur
- Cristina Grado
- Eugenio Maggi
- Renato Malavasi
- Maria Grazia Monaci
- Luciana Paluzzi
- Gustavo Serena
- Mirco Testi
- Catherine Zago
