= Mid-Century Loves =

1954 film

- Directed by: Glauco Pellegrini; Pietro Germi; Mario Chiari; Roberto Rossellini; Antonio Pietrangeli
- Cinematography: Tonino Delli Colli
- Edited by: Rolando Benedetti
- Music by: Carlo Rustichelli
- Release date: 18 February 1954
- Language: Italian

Mid-Century Loves (Italian: Amori di mezzo secolo) is a 1954 Italian anthology historical melodrama film consisting of five segments directed by Glauco Pellegrini, Pietro Germi, Mario Chiari, Roberto Rossellini and Antonio Pietrangeli.

== Plot ==
=== Episode # 01: "Romantic love", directed by: Glauco Pellegrini ===
In 1900 Elena, a young man from a rich bourgeois family, falls in love with the musician Mario. Her father and her aunt Matilde, however, would like the girl to marry a rich count. When Mario leaves for his tour, Matilde promises both young people to foster their feelings, while she actually destroys the letters they send each other, and persuades Elena that Mario has forgotten her. Elena ends up marrying the count.

=== Episode # 02: "War 1915-18", directed by: Pietro Germi ===
During the First World War, in a small Abruzzo village the very young lovers Antonio and Carmela get married and are expecting a child. Antonio is called to the front between the draft of 1900: Carmela and all friends and acquaintances are very proud of him and confidently await the end of the war. In the end the victory is announced and the celebrations are unleashed in the town: still no one knows that Antonio was killed in his first assault with the Sicily Brigade.

=== Episode # 03: "Postwar 1920", directed by: Mario Chiari ===
Alberto, an exalted squadist, leaves his country greeting his relatives and his girlfriend Susanna to take part in the March on Rome. In reality, he is mainly interested in Rome's nightlife and beautiful women. Susanna joins him in disguise and discovers him in a tabarin in equivocal attitudes with an entrîneuse, to whom she does not fail to reveal her contempt for her peasant girlfriend. But Susanna is not far behind in terms of beauty and sensuality, so much so that she is hired for a provocative number in the part of Salome, and she takes the opportunity to take her revenge on Alberto.

=== Episode # 04: "Naples 1943", directed by: Roberto Rossellini ===
During the bombings of the Second World War, actors and extras engaged in rehearsals at the Teatro di San Carlo rush into the air-raid shelter, and there the extra Carla and the airman Renato fall in love, but will be divided by death.

=== Episode # 05: "Girandola 1910", directed by: Antonio Pietrangeli ===
We are in the belle époque. A doctor advises a patient to limit his sexual activity; this however asks the doctor to mediate with his mistress so that she is less demanding. The woman is also having another relationship, and she too begs the doctor to intervene discreetly with the second man; and so on until among the whirlwind of lovers the doctor recognizes his wife.

== Cast ==
=== L'amore romantico ===
- Franco Interlenghi: Mario
- Leonora Ruffo: Elena
- Paola Borboni: Matilde
- Carlo Ninchi: Elena's father
- Luigi Tosi: Count Edoardo Savelli

=== Girandola 1910 ===
- Lea Padovani: Isabella
- Andrea Checchi: Gabriele
- Umberto Melnati: Cocò, the policeman
- Carlo Campanini: Michelangelo, the doctor
- Franco Scandurra

=== Guerra 1915-18 ===
- Maria Pia Casilio: Carmela
- Albino Cocco: Antonio
- Lauro Gazzolo: the master
- Amedeo Trilli

=== Dopoguerra 1920 ===
- Alberto Sordi: Alberto
- Silvana Pampanini: Susanna
- Giuseppe Porelli: Fosco D'Agata
- Alba Arnova: Yvonne
- Arturo Bragaglia: zio di Alberto
- Franco Migliacci

=== Napoli 1943 ===
- Antonella Lualdi: Carla
- Franco Pastorino: Renato
- Ugo D'Alessio
