= Symphony of Love =

- French film poster
- Directed by: Glauco Pellegrini
- Written by: Leonardo Benvenuti; Mario Bernardini; Fausto Domeni; Liana Ferri; Agenore Incrocci; Glauco Pellegrini; Tullio Pinelli; Furio Scarpelli
- Produced by: Antonio Musu; Luigi Rovere
- Starring: Claude Laydu; Marina Vlady; Lucia Bosé
- Cinematography: Mario Montuori
- Production companies: Cines; Imperial
- Distributed by: ENIC
- Release date: 1954
- Running time: 95 minutes
- Countries: France; Italy
- Language: Italian

Symphony of Love (Italian: Sinfonia d'amore) is a 1954 French-Italian historical melodrama musical film directed by Glauco Pellegrini and starring Claude Laydu, Marina Vlady, and Lucia Bosé. It is a biopic portraying the life of the composer Franz Schubert. The French release title was Unfinished Symphony (French: Symphonie inachevée).

== Cast ==
- Claude Laydu as Franz Schubert
- Marina Vlady as Caroline Esterhazy
- Lucia Bosé as Teresa Grob
- Jone Salinas as Colomba Calafatti
- Paolo Stoppa as Calafatti
- Gino Bechi as Vogl
- Silvio Bagolini as Mayrhofer
- Rosanna Carteri
- Riccardo Fellini as Kupelweiser
- Nicola Monti
- Heinz Moog as Count Esterhazy
- Edoardo Toniolo as Count Zilhay

== Bibliography ==
- Mitchell, Charles P. The Great Composers Portrayed on Film, 1913 through 2002. McFarland, 2004.
