= Appassionatamente =

1954 film

- Film poster
- Directed by: Giacomo Gentilomo
- Written by: Leo Benvenuti; Sandro Continenza; Liana Ferri
- Produced by: Angelo Rizzoli
- Starring: Amedeo Nazzari; Myriam Bru
- Cinematography: Anchise Brizzi
- Edited by: Elsa Dubbini
- Music by: Nino Rota
- Distributed by: Rizzoli Film
- Release date: 21 August 1954
- Language: Italian

Appassionatamente (i.e. "Passionately") is a 1954 Italian historical melodrama film directed by Giacomo Gentilomo and starring Amedeo Nazzari and Myriam Bru. It is loosely based on the drama play La Dame de Saint-Tropez by Auguste Anicet-Bourgeois and Adolphe d'Ennery.

== Plot ==
In the 19th century, the d'Alberti family—consisting of the father, Count d'Alberti, his son Giorgio, and his daughter Elena—is on the brink of bankruptcy. In an attempt to remedy the situation, the Count and his son decide to sell one of their villas at auction; however, the day before the sale, the wealthy mine owner Andrea Morandi decides to buy the villa, driven by his love for the young and beautiful Elena.

To avoid placing the family under an obligation of gratitude, Andrea instructs the notary to keep his identity as the buyer a secret. Unfortunately, his noble gesture is not enough to permanently resolve the family's financial woes.

Elena is informed of the situation—of which she had previously been unaware—by her brother; upon returning home, they arrive just in time to prevent their father from committing suicide, an act he had contemplated to escape the disgrace of bankruptcy. Only one solution remains to save the family: Elena must marry Andrea. Yet, she is romantically attached to a young doctor, Carlo, who is about to leave for Africa to advance his career. Their love, however, is not destined to last; Elena is persuaded by her family and her friend Ortensia Duprè—the notary's wife—to marry Mr. Morandi, despite harboring no romantic feelings for him. When Andrea asks Elena if she loves him, she nods in affirmation; he then approaches her father to ask for her hand in marriage. At that very moment, Elena rushes to the station where Carlo’s train is departing, but she manages only to wave goodbye, as the train has already pulled away.

The wedding day arrives; everyone is happy except the young bride. After the ceremony, the newlyweds travel to Andrea’s home, where Elena meets her husband’s cousins—Paola and Antonio—and Giannina, the maid assigned to assist her. From the very beginning, Paola views young Elena with contempt, believing she has usurped her role as mistress of the house. Moreover, she had secretly always wanted to marry her cousin herself, thereby becoming the undisputed mistress of the estate. On the evening of her arrival, Elena tells her husband she does not love him and married him solely to save her father from bankruptcy. Andrea is deeply saddened but, wishing to avoid a scandal, decides that while they will appear as husband and wife to the outside world, each is free to live their life as they please. The days pass in a monotonous and disheartening blur for Elena, whose only solace is the company of Giannina. Over time, Elena realizes she is developing feelings for her husband, yet he keeps his distance, believing she does not love him.

To provide employment for more villagers, Andrea decides to open a new tunnel in one of his mines. He asks Elena to organize a reception for the new gallery's official inauguration. For the occasion, she rearranges some of the villa's furniture, purchases decorations for the hall, and has new uniforms for the servants brought in from the city. Paola reacts poorly to these changes; in a fit of anger, she attempts to restore everything to its original state but is stopped by Andrea, who declares that, in this instance, his wife is far more capable than they are. On the day of the ball, Elena confides in her friend Ortensia that she loves Andrea. While changing her dress, Ortensia remembers she has a letter for Elena from Carlo but throws it into the fireplace, viewing it as a remnant of an inconvenient past.

During the festivities, Andrea and Elena dance a waltz, with eyes only for each other. Meanwhile, Paola enters Elena’s room and finds the letter—which the fire had failed to consume—in the hearth, and she asks her brother to hand it to Andrea. In the letter, Carlo declares his love for Elena, asserting that nothing will ever be able to separate them again. Upon reading these lines, Andrea decides to send his wife away, arranging for her to leave with Ortensia. Back in the ballroom, Elena—unaware of the situation—asks her husband for another waltz, but he refuses.

Resigned to the situation, Elena sets off with the Duprés. However, just as they are about to board the train, the mine's alarm bell rings ominously, prompting Elena to rush to the site. An entire team of miners has been trapped in the new tunnel; Andrea had gone down with a rescue crew to save them. After moments of harrowing suspense, the miners emerge safe and sound, but Andrea remains trapped inside; when he is finally brought out, he is unconscious. Elena tends to him, administering his medication and caring for him lovingly. Meanwhile, Paola and Antonio hatch a plot against Elena: they swap the medicine bottle for arsenic, intending to poison their cousin, frame Elena for the deed, and seize control of everything. Andrea wakes up and his wife declares her love for him, but moments later he begins to suffocate and slips back into unconsciousness.

When he eventually recovers, his health remains fragile despite the treatment. Consequently, the doctor decides to have him examined by a colleague who has just returned from Africa—Carlo—unaware that his former love, Elena, is now married to Andrea. The young doctor concludes that Andrea has been poisoned with arsenic. Paola implies that the culprit must be Elena, the only person who had been caring for Andrea during his convalescence. Andrea goes to Elena’s room looking for proof of what he refuses to believe; he finds the fateful vial of arsenic, which Paola had planted in Elena’s handbag moments earlier. Elena returns home, surprised to see Carlo and completely unaware of the situation. Andrea dismisses the doctor and vents his rage on Elena, who flees the house in despair. Paola orders her brother to kill Elena and stage it as a suicide, but Giannina overhears the plan and rushes to tell the master; he immediately races with some mine workers to save his beloved just as Antonio is about to throw her off a cliff. Caught in the act, Antonio attempts to flee but is captured by Andrea’s men. Andrea revives Elena, asking for her forgiveness and sharing the kiss that—at the film's conclusion—marks the beginning of their great love.

== Cast ==
- Amedeo Nazzari as Andrea Morandi
- Myriam Bru as Elena D'Alberti
- Andrea Checchi as Antonio
- Umberto Melnati as Dupré
- Vera Carmi as Paola
- Isa Barzizza as Ortensia Dupré
- Giorgio De Lullo as Carlo
- Antonio Machì as Giacomo
- Maria Zanoli as Maria
- Rolf Tasna as Giorgio D'Alberti
- Maria Pia Casilio as Giannina
- Enzo Biliotti as The Minister
