= Luigi Malerba =

Italian writer (1927–2008)

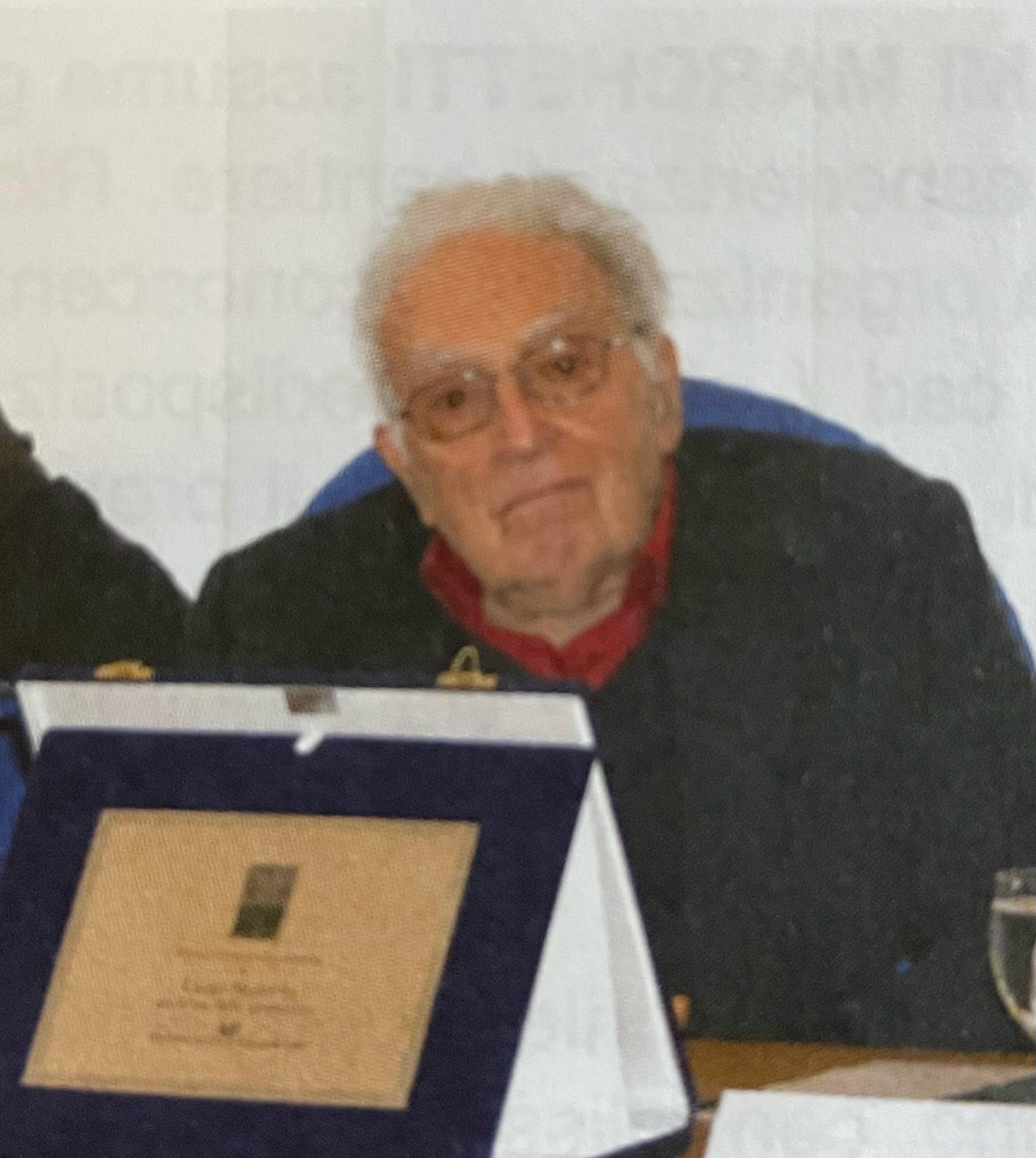
- Born: Luigi Bonardi; 11 November 1927; Berceto, Italy
- Died: 8 May 2008 (aged 80); Rome
- Occupations: Novelist; short story writer; screenwriter; essayist
- Writing career
- Period: 1950s–2000s
- Genre: Historical novel
- Notable works: The Serpent, What Is This Buzzing? Do You Hear It Too?
- Notable awards: Prix Médicis étranger 1970, Viareggio Prize 1992
- Movement: Neoavanguardia

Luigi Malerba (11 November 1927 – 8 May 2008), born Luigi Bonardi, was an Italian author known for his short stories, historical novels, and screenplays. He was a prominent figure in the Neoavanguardia movement and co-founded Gruppo 63, a literary collective influenced by Marxism and Structuralism. Some of his most renowned works include La scoperta dell'alfabeto, The Serpent, What Is This Buzzing, Do You Hear It Too?, Dopo il pescecane, Testa d'argento, Il fuoco greco, Le pietre volanti, Roman Ghosts, and Ithaca Forever: Penelope Speaks. Malerba also wrote several stories and novels for children, collaborating on some of them with Tonino Guerra.

He was the first writer to win the Prix Médicis étranger in 1970. He received several prestigious awards, including the Brancati Prize in 1979, the Mondello Prize in 1987, the Grinzane Cavour Prize in 1989 (alongside Stefano Jacomuzzi and Raffaele La Capria), the Viareggio Prize in 1992, the Flaiano Prize in 1990, and the Feronia-Città di Fiano Prize in 1992. In 2000, his name appeared among the candidates for the Nobel Prize in Literature.

== The memory ==
Malerba was a curious man—curious about language, history, customs, plots, and the coincidences of life. Unsurprisingly, he ventured into novels, linguistic essays, screenplays for cinema and television, and children's literature.

Umberto Eco said about him: "Many have associated Malerba with post-modern authors, but this classification is inaccurate. The author of What Is This Buzzing, Do You Hear It Too? always behaves in a maliciously ironic way, employing subterfuges and ambiguities"." He was one of the most important exponents of the Italian literary movement called Neoavanguardia, along with Balestrini, Sanguineti, and Manganelli.

Paolo Mauri wrote about him: "Malerba operated within the Neoavanguardia: he liked the idea of turning old narratives upside down and pursuing new, experimental solutions. With his novels The Serpent and What Is This Buzzing, Do You Hear It Too?, he began to play on the thread of paradox, where investigations lead to nothing, heroes are born from the writer's mind and made to live on the page only to reveal an unexpected trick and a new, absolutely original language. From novel to novel, he would then continue, constantly renewing his themes and style."

== Bibliography ==
=== Stories and novels ===
- La scoperta dell'alfabeto (1963)
- Il serpente (1966)
- Salto mortale (1968, winner of Prix Médicis)
- Il protagonista (1973)
- Mozziconi (1975)
- Storiette (1977)
- Il pataffio (1978)
- Le galline pensierose (1980)
- Diario di un sognatore (1981)
- Storiette tascabili (1984)
- Il pianeta azzurro (1986, winner of the winner of the Premio Mondello)
- I cani di Gerusalemme (1988, with Fabio Carpi)
- Testa d'argento (1988, winner of Grinzane Cavour Prize)
- Il fuoco greco (1990, set in the Byzantine Empire)
- Le pietre volanti (1992, winner of the Viareggio Prize and the Premio Feronia-Città di Fiano)
- Le maschere (1994)
- Itaca per sempre (1997)
- Pinocchio con gli stivali
- Città e dintorni (essays, 2001)
- Il circolo di Granada (2002)
- Fantasmi romani (2006)

== Screenplays ==
- The Overcoat (1952)
- The Beach (1954)
- Women and Soldiers (1954)
- Catch As Catch Can (1967)
- The Girl and the General (1967)
- Dismissed on His Wedding Night (1968)
- Oh, Grandmother's Dead (1969)
- Invasion (1970)

== Sources ==
- Anderson, Helen Victoria (2010), Historical and detective fiction in Italy 1950-2006 : Calvino, Malerba and Mancinelli, D. Phil. University of Oxford
