= Mario Costa (director) =

Italian actor, director, and screenwriter

Mario Costa (30 May 1904, Rome – 22 October 1995, Rome) was an Italian actor, director and screenwriter, active from 1934 to 1971.

== Selected filmography ==
- Stadium (1934)
- The Last of the Bergeracs (1934)
- Guest for One Night (1939)
- The Barber of Seville (1947)
- Pagliacci (1948)
- Mad About Opera (1948)
- Cavalcade of Heroes (1950)
- Song of Spring (1951)
- Trieste mia! (1952)
- Repentance (1952)
- Melody of Love (1952)
- I Always Loved You (1953)
- Perdonami! (1953)
- For You I Have Sinned (1953)
- Pietà per chi cade (1954)
- The Lovers of Manon Lescaut (1954)
- Revelation (1955)
- Arrivano i dollari! (1957)
- Attack of the Moors (1959)
- Cavalier in Devil's Castle (1959)
- Queen of the Pirates (1960)
- The Centurion (1961)
- Kerim, Son of the Sheik (1962)
- Gladiator of Rome (1962)
- Buffalo Bill, Hero of the Far West (1964)
- Latin Lovers (1965)
- Rough Justice (1970)
