= Giacomo Gentilomo =

Italian film director, painter (1909–2001)

Giacomo Gentilomo (5 April 1909 – 16 April 2001) was an Italian film director and painter.

== Early life ==
He was born in Trieste. Gentilomo moved to Rome at a young age.

== Career ==
At 21 years old he entered the cinema industry, working as a script surveyor and an assistant director. Active between 1933 and 1937 as a film editor, in 1939 he debuted as a director with Il Carnevale di Venezia. His 1945 film O sole mio got critical acclaim. His later career was mainly devoted to genre films, and failed to achieve significant critical interest. Dissatisfied with cinema, in the mid-1960s Gentilomo decided to abandon films and to instead fulfill his passion for painting.

== Filmography ==
- The Blind Woman of Sorrento (directed by Nunzio Malasomma, 1934)
- I Love You Only (directed by Mario Mattoli, 1935)
- Music in the Square (1936)
- White Amazons (1936)
- Sinfonia di Roma (1937, short)
- Condottieri (directed by Luis Trenker, 1937)
- The Carnival of Venice (1939)
- Ecco la radio! (1940)
- La Granduchessa si diverte (1940)
- Thrill (1941)
- Honeymoon (1941)
- Alone at Last (1942)
- Pazzo d'amore (1942)
- Mater dolorosa (1943)
- Short Circuit (1943)
- In cerca di felicità (1944)
- Tempesta d'anime (1946)
- O sole mio (1946)
- The Lovers (1946)
- Tehran (1946)
- The Brothers Karamazov (1947)
- Snow White and the Seven Thieves (1949)
- Hawk of the Nile (1950)
- Ti ritroverò (1949)
- El Sakr (1950)
- The Accusation (1950)
- The Young Caruso (1951)
- Immortal Melodies (1952)
- The Blind Woman of Sorrento (1953)
- The Two Orphans (1954)
- Appassionatamente (1954)
- Una voce una chitarra e un pò di luna (1956)
- La trovatella di Pompei (1957)
- The Dragon's Blood (1957)
- Knight Without a Country (1959)
- Maciste contro il vampiro (1961)
- The Last of the Vikings (1961)
- Charge of the Black Lancers (1962)
- Brennus, Enemy of Rome (1963)
- Slave Girls of Sheba (1963)
- Hercules Against the Moon Men (1964)
