= Half a Century of Song =

- Directed by: Domenico Paolella
- Written by: Oreste Biancoli; Dino Falconi; Antonio Ghirelli; Vinicio Marinucci; Giuseppe Patroni Griffi; Ettore Scola
- Produced by: Carlo Infascelli
- Music by: Carlo Rustichelli
- Release date: 1952
- Country: Italy
- Language: Italian

Half a Century of Song (Italian: Canzoni di mezzo secolo) is a 1952 Italian anthology comedy film by Domenico Paolella.

== Plot ==
Through a series of scenes inspired by various songs, the main stages of Italian history of the early twentieth century are traced.

The songs on which the episodes of the film are based are: Romantic Love, Ninì Tirabusciò, Scettico blu, Biondo Corsaro, Yvonne, Ziki-Paki, Ziki-Pu, Lodovico, Biagio Adagio, Stramilano, Vivere, Fccetto Nera, Tornerai and Munasterio ' and Santa Clara.

== Cast ==
- Marco Vicario
- Cosetta Greco
- Anna Maria Ferrero
- Franco Interlenghi
- Maria Fiore
- Flora Mariel
- Olga Villi
- Carlo Dapporto
- Silvana Pampanini
- Galeazzo Benti
- Erno Crisa
- Carlo Hinterman
- Pina Gallini
- Achille Millo
- Lauretta Masiero
- Renato Malavasi
- Renato Rascel
- Nico Pepe
- Mario Siletti
- Maria Pia Casilio
