= Cavalcade of Song =

1953 film

- Directed by: Domenico Paolella
- Written by: Oreste Biancoli; Ennio Flaiano; Antonio Ghirelli; Carlo Infascelli; Giuseppe Mangione; Vinicio Marinucci; Domenico Paolella; Giuseppe Patroni Griffi; Ettore Scola
- Starring: Alberto Sordi; Silvana Pampanini; Antonella Lualdi
- Cinematography: Carlo Carlini; Marco Scarpelli
- Edited by: Dolores Tamburini
- Production companies: Excelsa Film; Roma Film
- Distributed by: Minerva Film
- Release date: 9 October 1953
- Running time: 90 minutes
- Country: Italy
- Language: Italian

Cavalcade of Song (Italian: Canzoni, canzoni, canzoni) is a 1953 Italian musical film directed by Domenico Paolella and starring Alberto Sordi, Silvana Pampanini and Antonella Lualdi.

It was shot in Ferraniacolor at the Cinecittà studios in Rome.

== Cast ==
- Alberto Sordi as Alberto
- Silvana Pampanini as La dattilografa
- Antonella Lualdi as La dirimpettaia del quinto piano
- Franco Interlenghi as Il notaio
- Marina Vlady as La fanciulla amata
- Flora Mariel
- Erno Crisa as Il guappo
- Galeazzo Benti as Il soldatino
- Enrico Viarisio
- Franco Coop
- Renato Malavasi
- Cosetta Greco as Ex-amante del guappo
- Cristina Fantoni
- Patrizia Lari
- Rosy Mazzacurati
- Delia Scala as Titina
- Aroldo Tieri as L'innamorato della dattilografa
- Luisella Boni
- Nino Manfredi
- Lilli Scaringi
- Mariolina Bovo
- Renata Campanati
- Giulio Chiandotto
- Anna Di Lorenzo
- Fiorella Ferrero
- Cristina Grado
- Lily Granado
- Vittorio Mangano
- Marcella Mariani
- Anna Maria Mazzarini
- Sandro Pistolini as Bambino
- Teresa Pollio
- Marisa Valenti

== Bibliography ==
- Fava, Claudio G. (2003). Alberto Sordi. Rome: Gremese Editore. ISBN 978-88-8440-257-8.
