= Laugh! Laugh! Laugh! =

- Directed by: Edoardo Anton
- Written by: Edoardo Anton; Galeazzo Benti; Leo Bomba; Achille Campanile; Alvaro De Torres; Agenore Incrocci; Carlo Infascelli; Guido Leoni; Marcello Marchesi; Vinicio Marinucci; Furio Scarpelli; Ettore Scola
- Starring: Carlo Dapporto; Riccardo Billi; Mario Riva; Tino Scotti; Ugo Tognazzi
- Cinematography: Mario Damicelli
- Edited by: Dolores Tamburini
- Music by: Carlo Rustichelli
- Production companies: Excelsa Film; Roma Film
- Distributed by: Minerva Film; Titanus
- Release date: 1954
- Running time: 89 minutes
- Country: Italy
- Language: Italian

Laugh! Laugh! Laugh! (Italian: Ridere! Ridere! Ridere!) is a 1954 Italian comedy film directed by Edoardo Anton and starring Tino Scotti, Ugo Tognazzi and Carlo Dapporto.

The film's sets were designed by the art director Beni Montresor. It was shot in Ferraniacolor.

== Plot ==
Mr. Spinotti travels on a train. He passes the inspector and asks the users for their tickets. The protagonist argues with the inspector, but little by little he begins to tell stories and jokes to those present.

== Cast ==
- Tino Scotti as Commissario Rossi
- Ugo Tognazzi as Dottore
- Carlo Dapporto as François Salvo
- Sandra Mondaini as Innamorata litigiosa
- Riccardo Billi as Controllore
- Mario Riva as Otello Spinotti
- Alberto Talegalli as Pignolo
- Gianni Bonos as Mimo
- Luigi Bonos as Mimo
- Vittorio Bonos as Mimo
- Paolo Panelli as Innamorato litigioso
- Paolo Ferrari as Corteggiatore
- Pina Gallini as Vecchietta
- Raffaele Pisu as Ubriaco
- Galeazzo Benti as Snob
- Raimondo Vianello as Paziente da operare
- Nino Manfredi as Signore che non vuole pagare
- Monica Vitti as Maria Teresa

== Bibliography ==
- Chiti, Roberto & Poppi, Roberto. Dizionario del cinema italiano: Dal 1945 al 1959. Gremese Editore, 1991.
