= Infascelli =

Infascelli is an Italian surname. Notable people with the surname include:

- Alex Infascelli (born 1967), Italian director, screenwriter and producer
- Carlo Infascelli (1913–1984), Italian film producer, director, screenwriter
- Fiorella Infascelli (born 1952), Italian film director and screenwriter
