= Songs of Italy =

- Directed by: Domenico Paolella
- Written by: Oreste Biancoli; Carlo Infascelli; Giuseppe Mangione; Ugo Pirro
- Starring: Marco Vicario; Rossana Podestà; Silvana Pampanini
- Cinematography: Mario Fioretti
- Music by: Carlo Rustichelli
- Release date: 1955
- Country: Italy
- Language: Italian

Songs of Italy (Italian: Canzoni di tutta Italia) is a 1955 Italian musical film directed by Domenico Paolella and starring Marco Vicario, Rossana Podestà and Silvana Pampanini.

It was shot in Ferraniacolor. This film was one of several musicarelli directed by Paolella.

== Cast ==
- Marco Vicario
- Rossana Podestà
- Silvana Pampanini
- Fausto Tozzi
- Anna Maria Ferrero
- Tamara Lees
- Giorgio De Lullo
- Dante Maggio
- Irène Galter
- Lyla Rocco
- Roberto Risso
- Carlo Sposito
- Armida De Pasquali
- Italia Dini
- Sandra Francis
- Gisella Monaldi
- Mercedes Mozart

== Reception ==
An Italian review of the time characterises some episodes of the film as 'weak' and the overall dubbing of the songs as 'sometimes unhappy'.

== Bibliography ==
- Anna Maria Torriglia. Broken Time, Fragmented Space: A Cultural Map for Postwar Italy. University of Toronto Press, 2002.
