= Tripoli, Beautiful Land of Love =

- Directed by: Ferruccio Cerio
- Written by: Alessandro Ferraù; Mario Francisci; Ruggero Maccari; Giuseppe Mangione; Sergio Sollima
- Produced by: Mario Francisci
- Starring: Alberto Sordi; Lyla Rocco; Fulvia Franco
- Cinematography: Mario Montuori
- Edited by: Mario Bonotti
- Music by: Franco D'Achiardi
- Production company: Laura Film
- Distributed by: Oro Film
- Release date: 1954
- Running time: 104 minutes
- Country: Italy
- Language: Italian

Tripoli, Beautiful Land of Love (Italian: Tripoli, bel suol d'amore) is a 1954 Italian comedy war film directed by Ferruccio Cerio and starring Alberto Sordi, Lyla Rocco and Fulvia Franco. It takes its title from a traditional song of the same name which features prominently on the soundtrack. The plot draws some inspiration from that of The Three Musketeers. It was shot in Ferraniacolor and took around 248 million lire at the Italian box office.

It is set against the backdrop of the Libyan War between Italy and the Ottoman Empire in 1911. A young man from the countryside volunteers to join the Bersaglieri, but quickly clashes with three overbearing comrades. They resent the newcomer because Maria the daughter of the marshal, who they are all in love with, has shown attention to the young man. However all eventually become close friends. When war breaks out, they travel to Tripoli to fight, accompanied by Maria who has enlisted in the Red Cross.

== Cast ==
- Alberto Sordi as Alberto
- Lyla Rocco as Maria Carocci
- Fulvia Franco as Nadia
- Riccardo Billi as Marshal Carocci
- Mario Riva as Giulio Cesare
- Mirko Ellis as Renato
- Luigi Pavese as Marshal Nerone
- Maurizio Arena as Feruccio
- Andrea Checchi as Captain Andressi
- Alfredo Varelli as Lieutenant
- Gianni Rizzo as Rudi
- Mino Doro as L'eccelenza
- Aldo Bettoni as Il colonnello
- Luciana Piperno as Isabella
- Cesare Vieri as Il frate del cappellano
- Maria Pia Conte
- Angela Pierro
- Giannina Chiantoni as Madre di Giulio Cesare
- Libero Intorre
- Marcela Daviland
- Enzo Maggio as Un attore del Caffé-Concerto
- Pasquale Campagnola as Sergente della ronda
- Rossana Galli as Crocerossina
- Claudio Ermelli as Il signore stizzoso del Caffé-Concerto

== Bibliography ==
- Chiti, Roberto & Poppi, Roberto. Dizionario del cinema italiano: Dal 1945 al 1959. Gremese Editore, 1991.
