= Desert Warrior (1957 film) =

1957 film

- Directed by: Goffredo Alessandrini; Fernando Cerchio; León Klimovsky; Gianni Vernuccio
- Written by: Alfonso Paso; Mariano Ozores; Edoardo Anton; Oreste Biancoli; Leo Bomba; Giuseppe Mangione; Manuel Villegas López
- Produced by: Carlo Infascelli; Benito Perojo; Miguel Tudela
- Starring: Carmen Sevilla; Ricardo Montalbán; Gino Cervi
- Cinematography: Antonio L. Ballesteros; Mario Damicelli
- Edited by: Antonio Ramírez de Loaysa
- Music by: Michel Michelet
- Production companies: Films Benito Perojo; Parc Film; Rialto Film; Roma Film
- Release date: 31 October 1957
- Running time: 87 minutes
- Countries: Italy; Spain
- Languages: Italian; Spanish

Desert Warrior (Italian: Gli amanti del deserto, Spanish: Los amantes del desierto) is a 1957 Italian-Spanish adventure film directed by Goffredo Alessandrini, Fernando Cerchio, León Klimovsky and Gianni Vernuccio and starring Carmen Sevilla, Ricardo Montalbán and Gino Cervi.

The film had a difficult production process. Some scenes were shot on location in Cairo, but this coincided with the outbreak of the Suez Crisis. The film's sets were designed by the art directors Sigfrido Burmann and Mario Garbuglia.

== Plot ==
Ibrahim is a despot with ambitions – he wants to bring peace to the kingdom of Kamal, even if it is by assassinating all his opponents. With the help of his less than trustworthy subordinate Selim, he manages to ensure that nobody even dares to utter any objections; nor the rightful ruler, Sultan Omar, or his son Prince Said. However, the latter plans a plot against Ibrahim. In order to raise the necessary money, Said and his men raid caravans. During one such raid, he meets Princess Amina, the despot's daughter, who pretends to be a dancer. Amina falls in love with him, which poses problems for her father, who has promised her in marriage to Selim. Said and his people succeed in ousting Ibrahim from the throne and happily ends with Amina.

== Cast ==
- Carmen Sevilla as Princess Amina
- Ricardo Montalbán as Prince Said
- Gino Cervi as Ibrahim
- José Guardiola as Kamal
- Franca Bettoia as Suleika
- Samia Gamal
- Manuel Alcón
- Mariangela Giordano
- Manuel Guitián
- Domingo Rivas
- Joaquín Bergía
- Félix Briones
- Pilar Gómez Ferrer

== Bibliography ==
- De España, Rafael (1994). Directory of Spanish and Portuguese Film-Makers and Films. Greenwood Press. ISBN 978-0-313-29459-4.
