= Shadows on the Grand Canal =

- Directed by: Glauco Pellegrini
- Written by: Glauco Pellegrini; Rodolfo Sonego
- Produced by: Luigi Rovere
- Starring: Isa Pola; Antonio Centa; Carlo Hintermann
- Cinematography: Mario Montuori
- Music by: Gino Gorini
- Production company: Rovere Film
- Distributed by: Lux Film
- Release date: 1951
- Running time: 94 minutes
- Country: Italy
- Language: Italian

Shadows on the Grand Canal (Italian: Ombre sul Canal Grande) is a 1951 Italian crime film directed by Glauco Pellegrini and starring Isa Pola, Antonio Centa and Carlo Hintermann. It was entered into the competition at the 12th Venice International Film Festival.

== Cast ==
- Isa Pola as Daniela
- Antonio Centa as Stefano
- Carlo Hintermann as Commissioner
- Gianni Cavalieri as Private eye
- Elena Zareschi as Marta
- Emilio Baldanello as Daniela's Father
- Attilio Tosatto as Silvestro Pavani
- Vanda Baldanello as Silvestro Pavani's Wife

== Bibliography ==
- Marco Scotini. Carlo Ludovico Ragghianti and the Cinematic Nature of Vision. Charta, 2000.
