= Ore 10: lezione di canto =

- Directed by: Marino Girolami
- Starring: Claudio Villa
- Cinematography: Adalberto Albertini
- Edited by: Franco Fraticelli
- Music by: Ovidio Sarra
- Release date: 1955
- Country: Italy
- Language: Italian

Ore 10: lezione di canto (Italian for "10 o'clock: singing lesson", also spelled as Ore dieci lezione di canto) is a 1955 Italian musical comedy film written and directed by Marino Girolami.

== Cast ==
- Claudio Villa: Claudio
- Rosy Mazzacurati: Rosy Montefiori
- Enio Girolami: Ennio
- Giorgio Gandos: Giorgio
- Pietro De Vico: Pietro
- Silvio Bagolini: Silvio
- Janet Hug: Valeria
- Virgilio Riento: Beniamino
- Arturo Bragaglia: Prof. Campanella
- Franco Coop: Prof. Biraghi
- Ernesto Almirante: Prof. Tapparelli
- Pina Gallini: Professor of singing
