= Goodbye Naples =

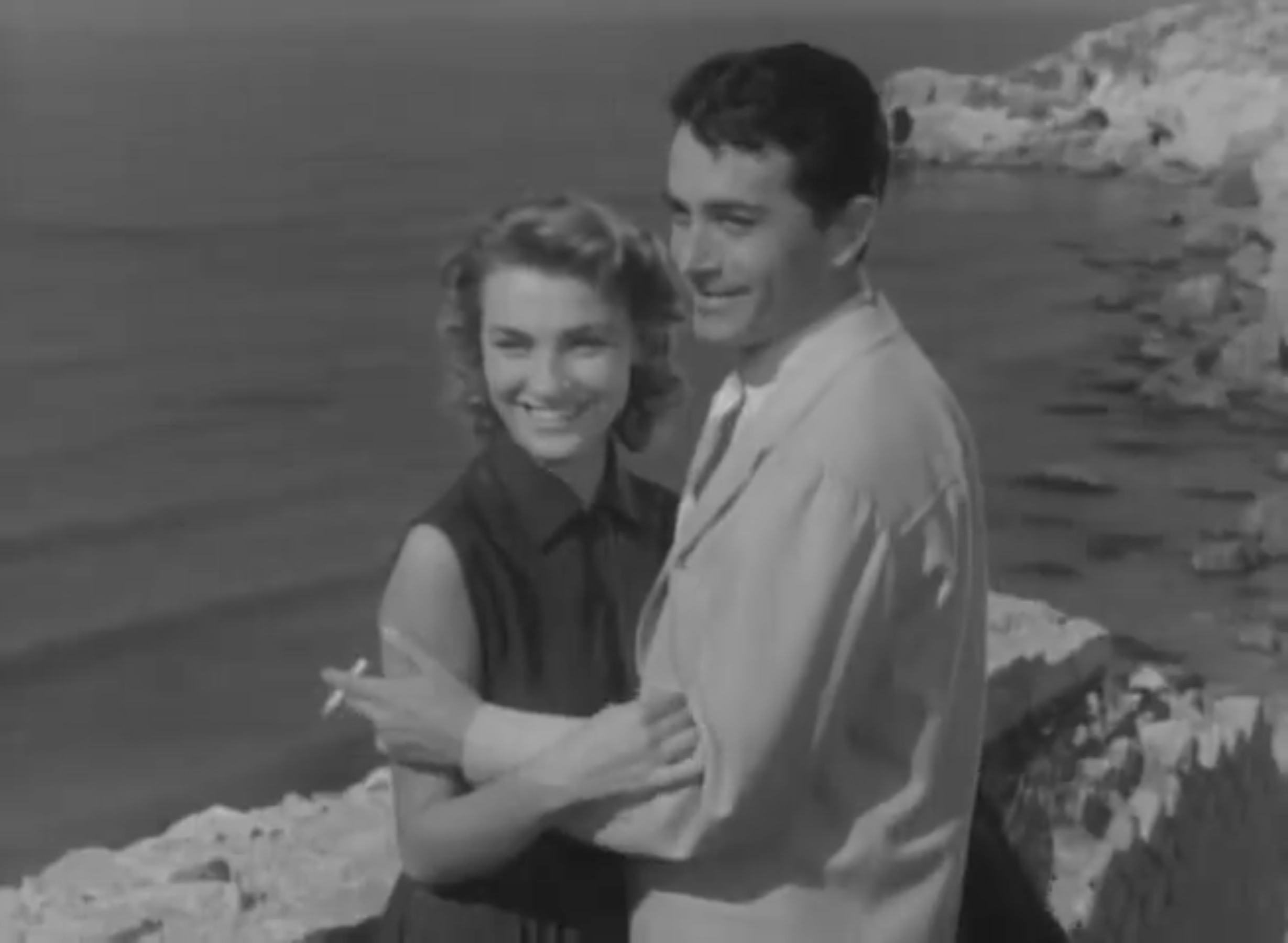
- Still from the film. Maria Grazia Francia and Giorgio de Lullo embrace in a scene.
- Directed by: Roberto Bianchi Montero
- Written by: Edoardo Anton; Enzo Avitabile; Ugo Guerra; Mario Pellegrino; Giuseppe Valentini
- Produced by: Antonio Ferrigno
- Starring: Tamara Lees; Andrea Checchi; Giorgio De Lullo
- Cinematography: Mario Nebiolo
- Edited by: Mario Serandrei
- Music by: Franco Langella
- Production company: A Effe Cinematografica
- Distributed by: Aurora Film
- Release date: 7 January 1955
- Running time: 88 minutes
- Country: Italy
- Language: Italian

Goodbye Naples (Italian: Addio, Napoli!) is a 1955 Italian melodrama film directed by Roberto Bianchi Montero and starring Tamara Lees, Andrea Checchi and Giorgio De Lullo.

The film's sets were designed by the art director Ivo Battelli and Alfredo Montori.

== Cast ==
- Tamara Lees as Irene
- Andrea Checchi as Frank
- Giorgio De Lullo a sTom
- Leopoldo Valentini as Carmine
- Maria Grazia Francia as Clara
- Virna Lisi: Clara's friend (uncredited)
- Charles Fawcett as Charles Burton
- Dante Maggio as Pasquale
- Anna Pretolani as Nunziata
- Antonio Corevi as Gaetano Fortunati
- Nino Vingelli as Pasqualino De Rosa
- Domenico Maggio as Giulio Lombardo
- Pasquale Martino as The Priest
- Vittoria Paoletti as Clara's daughter

== Bibliography ==
- Chiti, Roberto & Poppi, Roberto. Dizionario del cinema italiano: Dal 1945 al 1959. Gremese Editore, 1991.
