= Article 519, Penal Code =

1952 film

- Film poster
- Directed by: Leonardo Cortese
- Written by: Oreste Biancoli; Franco Brusati; Vladimiro Cajoli; Leonardo Cortese; Paola Ojetti
- Produced by: Robert Chabert
- Starring: Henri Vidal; Cosetta Greco; Paolo Stoppa
- Cinematography: Anchise Brizzi
- Edited by: Otello Colangeli
- Music by: Carlo Innocenzi
- Production companies: Francinex; Zeus Film
- Distributed by: Zeus Film
- Release date: 29 October 1952
- Running time: 86 minutes
- Countries: France; Italy
- Language: Italian

Article 519, Penal Code (Italian: Art. 519 codice penale, French: Violence charnelle) is a 1952 French-Italian crime melodrama film directed by Leonardo Cortese and starring Henri Vidal, Cosetta Greco and Paolo Stoppa. The film's sets were designed by the art director Virgilio Marchi.

== Title ==
The movie was tentatively named as Violenza carnale (Sexual Assault), which is also the name of the article of the Italian penal code which until 1996 applied to sexual violence mentioned in the final title.

== Cast ==
- Henri Vidal as Renato Berti
- Cosetta Greco as Clara Martini
- Paolo Stoppa as Avv. Sardi
- Rosy Mazzacurati as Luisa Berti
- Giorgio Albertazzi as Franco, Luisa's fiancée
- Denise Grey as Clara's mother
- Emilio Cigoli as Clara's father
- Maria Laura Rocca as Marta

== Bibliography ==
- Domenico, Roy. The Devil and the Dolce Vita: Catholic Attempts to Save Italy's Soul, 1948-1974. CUA Press, 2021.
