= Nadia Gray =

Romanian film actress (1923–1994)

- Born: Nadia Kujnir; 23 November 1923; Bucharest, Romania
- Died: 13 June 1994 (aged 70); New York City, New York, U.S.
- Occupation: Actress
- Years active: 1949–1968
- Spouse(s): N. Goldenberg; Constantin Cantacuzino (1946–1958) (his death); Herbert Silverman (1967–1994) (her death)

Nadia Gray (born Nadia Kujnir; 23 November 1923 – 13 June 1994) was a Romanian film actress.

== Biography ==
Gray was born into a Jewish family in Bucharest. Her father moved to Romania from Russia, and her mother was from Akkerman in Bessarabia (nowadays Bilhorod-Dnistrovskyi in Ukraine). She left Romania for Paris in the late 1940s to escape the communist takeover after World War II. Her film debut was in L'Inconnu d'un soir in 1949. Perhaps her best-known role was in the Federico Fellini film La Dolce Vita (1960).

She played a guest role in an episode of the television series The Prisoner ("The Chimes of Big Ben", 1967).

== Personal life ==
She was first married to N. Goldenberg (later Herescu), a wealthy businessman from Chișinău, then to Constantin Cantacuzino, a Romanian aristocrat who was one of Romania's top fighter aces of the war. They were married from 1946 to his death in 1958. Her third husband was Manhattan attorney Herbert Silverman (1912–2003). They were married from 1967 to her death in 1994. She died in New York City from a stroke.

== Partial filmography ==
Most of Gray's films were non-English language productions.

- L'Inconnu d'un soir (1949) - Édith aka Marie-Ange
- The Spider and the Fly (1949) - Madeleine Saincaize
- Monseigneur (1949) - La duchesse de Lémoncourt
- Night Without Stars (1951) - Alix Delaisse née Malinay
- Valley of Eagles (1951) - Kara Niemann
- Wife for a Night (1952) - Geraldine
- Deceit (1952) - Anna Comin
- Top Secret (1952) - Tania
- Puccini (1953) - Cristina Vernini
- Rhine Virgin (1953) - Maria Meister
- Ivan, Son of the White Devil (1953) - Principessa Alina
- Finalmente libero! (1954) - Carla
- 100 Years of Love (1954) - Countess Muriella di Lucoli (segment "Pendolin")
- Gran Varietà (1954)
- Pietà per chi cade (1954) - Anna Savelli
- Melody of Love (1954) - Nadia Sandor
- Neapolitan Carousel (1954) - Pretty tramp
- Dames Don't Care (1954) - Henrietta Aymes
- Crossed Swords (1954) - Fulvia
- House of Ricordi (1954) - Giulia Grisi
- The Two Orphans (1954) - Diane de Vaudrey - countess de Linières
- Cardinal Lambertini (1954) - Isabella di Pietramelara
- I cinque dell'Adamello (1954) - Magda
- Casta Diva (1954) - Giuditta Pasta
- Sins of Casanova (1955) - Margherita Teresa von Kleinwert
- The Last Five Minutes (1955) - Valeria Roberti, moglie di Filippo
- La moglie è uguale per tutti (1955) - Lea
- Music in the Blood (1955) - Gina Martelli
- Il falco d'oro (1955) - Ines della Torre
- Agguato sul mare (1955) - Circe
- Hengst Maestoso Austria (1956) - Gräfin Marika Szilady
- Folies-Bergère (1957) - Suzy Morgan
- Parola di ladro (1957)
- The Black Devil (1957) - Duchessa Lucrezia
- Sénéchal the Magnificent (1957) - La princesse Marida Ludibescu
- La Parisienne (1957) - La reine Greta
- Vacanze a Ischia (1957) - Carla Occhipinti
- Meine schöne Mama (1958) - Mathildes Mutter Maria
- The Captain's Table (1959) - Mrs. Porteous
- Violent Summer (1959) - (uncredited)
- Muerte al amanecer (1959) - Victoria Costa
- La Dolce Vita (1960) - Nadia
- Le signore (1960) - Tatiana Becker
- Letto a tre piazze (1960) - Amalia
- Maria, Registered in Bilbao (1960) - Berta
- Candide ou l'optimisme au XXe siècle (1960) - La dame de compagnie / Dame
- Mr. Topaze (1961) - Suzy
- Le pavé de Paris (1961) - Monique
- Gioventù di notte (1961) - Fulvia
- Mourir d'amour (1961) - Patricia
- The Crumblers Are Doing Well (1961) - Thérèse
- Le jeu de la vérité (1961) - Solange Vérate
- Wenn beide schuldig werden (1962) - Hilde Goetz
- Rocambole (1963) - Comtesse
- Maniac (1963) - Eve Beynat
- Zwei Whisky und ein Sofa (1963) - Mrs. Button
- Encounter in Salzburg (1964) - Felicitas Wilke
- The Crooked Road (1965) - Cosima
- The Adventurer of Tortuga (1965) - Dona Rosita
- Winnetou and Old Firehand (1966) - Michèle Mercier
- The Oldest Profession (1967) - Nadia (segment "Aujourd'hui")
- Two for the Road (1967) - Francoise Dalbret
- The Naked Runner (1967) - Karen Gisevius
