= Wife for a Night =

1952 film

- Belgian poster
- Directed by: Mario Camerini
- Written by: Mario Camerini; Franco Brusati; Paolo Levi
- Based on: The Dazzling Hour by Anna Bonacci
- Produced by: Angelo Rizzoli
- Starring: Gina Lollobrigida; Gino Cervi; Nadia Gray; Paolo Stoppa
- Cinematography: Aldo Giordani
- Edited by: Mario Camerini; Adriana Novelli
- Music by: Alessandro Cicognini
- Production companies: Mambretti Film; Rizzoli Film
- Distributed by: Cineriz
- Release date: 12 July 1952
- Running time: 86 minutes
- Country: Italy
- Language: Italian

Wife for a Night (Italian: Moglie per una notte) is a 1952 Italian historical comedy film directed by Mario Camerini and starring Gina Lollobrigida, Gino Cervi and Nadia Gray. It was based on the play The Dazzling Hour by Anna Bonacci which was later updated for the Billy Wilder film Kiss Me, Stupid. The film's sets were designed by the art director Flavio Mogherini. Location shooting took place around Parma.

== Plot ==
The late nineteenth century: Count d'Origo, a notorious roué, spots an attractive woman. Hoping to seduce her, he attempts to find out who she is. In fact she is Geraldine, a practiced courtesan. However, the local mayor tells the Count that she is Ottavia, the wife of his nephew, Enrico, a struggling young musician. Enrico is hoping to stage his newly completed opera. With the Count's support he will get the backing he needs. His uncle hopes to help Enrico by employing Geraldine to impersonate Ottavia, so she can be "seduced". Before she submits, Geraldine will extract a promise from the Count to stage her "husband"'s opera. Geraldine, Ottavia and Enrico agree to go along with the plot. However, as Enrico introduces Geraldine to the eager Count he becomes increasingly jealous as the Count moves in. Eventually he forces the Count to leave after becoming angered by his advances. Charmed by his protectiveness, Geraldine asks him to pretend she is really his wife for one night, so that she can live her dream of having a normal life with a devoted husband.

Meanwhile, the real Ottavia has been staying at Geraldine's home, where she becomes intrigued by the courtesan lifestyle. She is coached in skills of flirtation by Geraldine's maid. Pretending to be Geraldine, she entertains two buffoonish suitors. Sexually frustrated, the Count learns about the courtesan Geraldine and visits her home. He is entranced by Ottavia. When she learns that her husband threw the Count out to be alone with Geraldine, she swears she will revenge herself on him. The maid persuades her to force the Count to agree to put the opera on; she will get her revenge by making her husband both jealous and indebted to her. Ottavia pretends to offer herself to the Count, but keeps delaying, playing music from the opera on the piano. She refuses to go to bed with him until he agrees to get it performed. Eventually he gives in. As he tries to kiss her, looking forward to a night of passion, Ottavia pretends to faint. The Count is forced to sit up with her for the rest of the night while she "recovers".

Some months later the opera is performed to great acclaim. The principal characters meet once again in their true identities.

== Cast ==
- Gino Cervi as Count d'Origo
- Gina Lollobrigida as Ottavia
- Nadia Gray as Geraldine
- Armando Francioli as Enrico Belli
- Paolo Stoppa as Agusto
- Galeazzo Benti as Maurizio
- Paolo Panelli as Gualteri
- Eugenia Tavani as Grand Duchess
- Nietta Zocchi as Yvonne
- Marisa Pintus as Bettaldi
- Silvio Bagolini as Silvio

== Bibliography ==
- Cavallaro, Daniela (ed.) Italian Women's Theatre, 1930-1960: An Anthology of Plays. Intellect Books, 2012.
- Deleyto, Celestino. The Secret Life of Romantic Comedy. Manchester University Press, 2019.
