= Rosy Mazzacurati =

Italian film and stage actress (1935–2020)

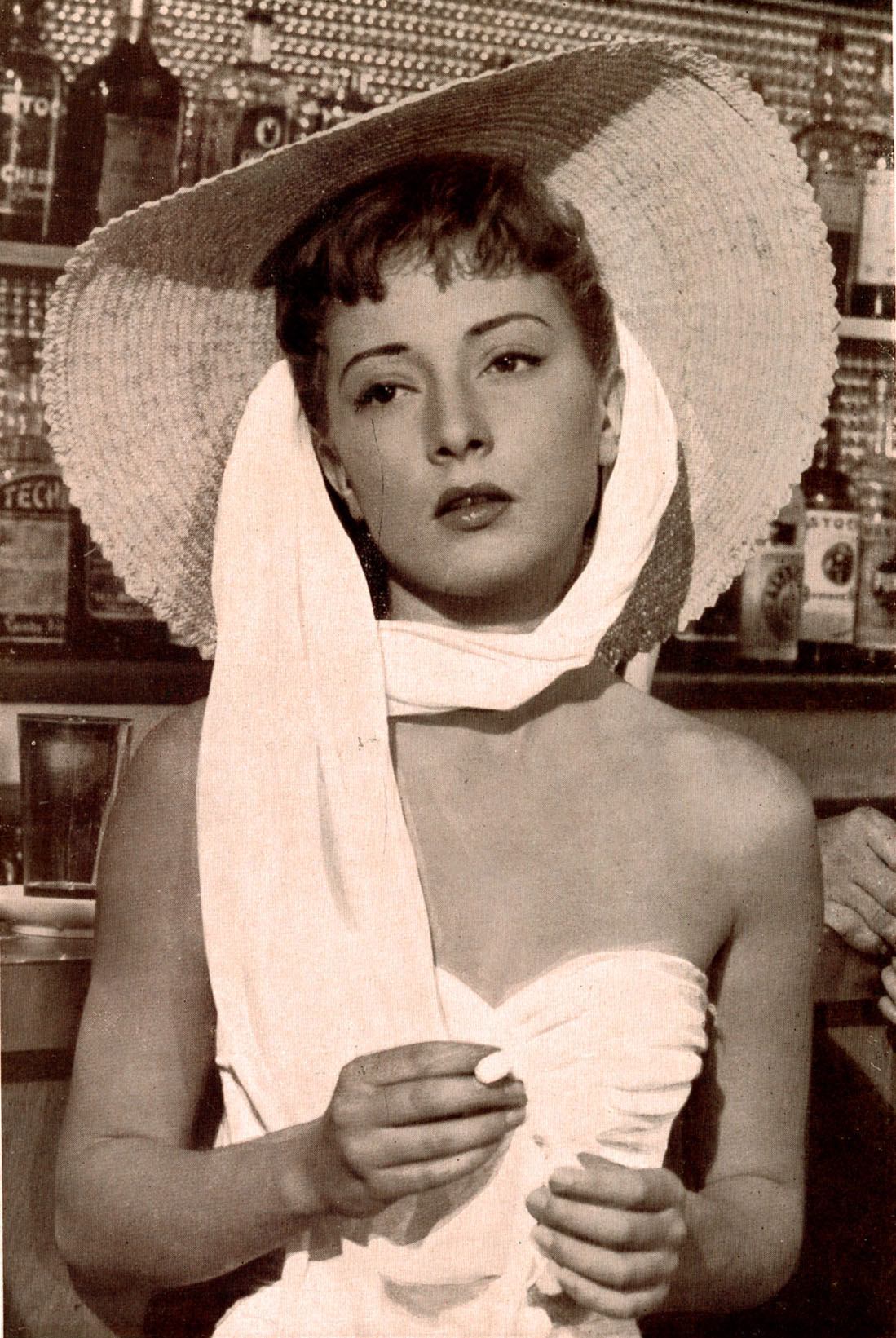
- Mazzacurati in 1953
- Born: 9 May 1935; Gualtieri, Reggio Emilia, Kingdom of Italy
- Died: 16 October 2020 (aged 85); Rome, Italy
- Occupation: Actress

Rosy Mazzacurati (9 May 1935 – 16 October 2020) was an Italian film and stage actress.

== Life and career ==
Born in Ferrara, Mazzacurati was the daughter of the sculptor and painter Renato Marino Mazzacurati. Eager to embark on an acting career, at a young age she moved to Rome, where she enrolled in the Centro Sperimentale di Cinematografia, graduating in 1953. She had made her film debut one year earlier, in the Leonardo Cortese's drama Art. 519 codice penale.

During her career Mazzacurati was often cast in supporting roles, notably playing a role of weight in Michelangelo Antonioni's movie La Notte. She was also active on stage. Mazzacurati retired in the mid-1960s.

Mazzacurati died in Rome on 16 October 2020, at the age of 85.

== Selected filmography ==
- Article 519, Penal Code (1952)
- Cavalcade of Song (1953)
- The Beach (1954)
- Ore 10: lezione di canto (1955)
- Red and Black (1955)
- Young Husbands (1958)
- The Black Chapel (1959)
- La Notte (1961)
- La monaca di Monza (1962)
