= Giorgio De Lullo =

Italian actor and stage director (1921–1981)

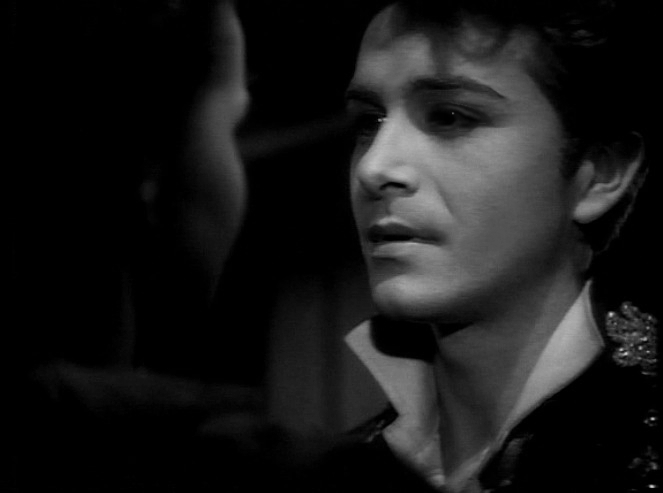
- De Lullo in Eugenia Grandet (1946)
- Born: 24 April 1921; Rome, Italy
- Died: 10 July 1981 (aged 60); Rome, Italy

Giorgio De Lullo (24 April 1921 – 10 July 1981) was an Italian actor and stage director.

== Career ==
Born in Rome, in 1943 De Lullo enrolled at the Silvio d’Amico Academy of Dramatic Arts, but after two years he was forced to leave the courses as he had contravened the strict academic regulations appearing in a stage work directed by Mario Landi and held at the Teatro Manzoni in Milan. The same year he got critical acclaim for his performance in Il Candeliere directed by Orazio Costa.

In 1946 he made his film debut, and worked on stage with Luchino Visconti, with whom he collaborated intensively in the following years. In 1954 De Lullo co-founded the theatrical company "La compagnia dei giovani" together with Rossella Falk, Anna Maria Guarnieri, Romolo Valli and Umberto Orsini, and the company achieved national and international success. He debuted as a stage director in 1955, with an adaptation of Colette's Gigi. He died of cirrhosis.

== Selected filmography ==
- The Ten Commandments (1945)
- The Vow (1950)
- It Takes Two to Sin in Love (1954)
- Songs of Italy (1955)
- Goodbye Naples (1955)
