= Letto a tre piazze =

The King-Sized Bed
- Directed by: Steno
- Written by: Lucio Fulci; Steno; Sandro Continenza
- Produced by: Angelo Rizzoli
- Starring: Totò; Peppino De Filippo; Nadia Gray
- Cinematography: Alvaro Mancori
- Edited by: Giuliana Attenni
- Music by: Carlo Rustichelli
- Distributed by: Cineriz
- Release date: 1960
- Running time: 105 minutes
- Country: Italy
- Language: Italian

Letto a tre piazze (translation: The King-Sized Bed) is a 1960 Italian comedy film directed by Steno. The film marked the last collaboration between Totò and Lucio Fulci, author of the script and initially chosen as director.

== Cast ==
- Totò: Antonio Di Cosimo
- Peppino De Filippo: Prof. Peppino Castagnano
- Nadia Gray: Amalia
- Cristina Gajoni: Prassede, the maid
- Aroldo Tieri: Lawyer Vacchi
- Gabriele Tinti: Nino, lover of Prassede
- Angela Luce: Jeannette
- Mario Castellani: The Principal
- Nico Pepe: The Hotel Manager

== Censorship ==
When Letto A Tre Piazze was first released in Italy in 1960 the Italian Ministry of Cultural Heritage and Activities agreed upon its release on the following conditions. 1) the sequence that includes a dancer in a nightclub will be deleted. In particular the sequence in which a dancer, seen in the background behind the heads of Tieri and De Filipo, is doing the belly dance. The afore mentioned scene is considered to be offensive to morality. The scene was shortened by 19 meters, it is currently 22 meters total. Document N° 32482 signed on 28 September 1960 by Minister Umberto Tupini.
