= L'amore più bello =

1958 film by Glauco Pellegrini

- Directed by: Glauco Pellegrini
- Cinematography: Carlo Montuori
- Music by: Carlo Rustichelli
- Release date: 1958
- Country: Italy
- Language: Italian

L'amore più bello (The most beautiful love, also known as L'uomo dai calzoni corti) is a 1958 Italian comedy-drama film directed by Glauco Pellegrini.

== Plot ==
Salvatore escapes from the orphanage of Caltanissetta to find the mother he never knew. Before finding her in Venice he will live several adventures in Naples, Rome and Milan.

== Cast ==
- Edoardo Nevola: Salvatore D'Esposito
- Eduardo De Filippo: Gennaro
- Memmo Carotenuto: Nando
- Francisco Rabal: Mario
- Julia Martínez: Gina
- Irene Cefaro: Estella
- Alida Valli: Carolina
