= Fioretta Dolfi =

Italian actress (1920–1996)

- Born: Marcella Bersini; 19 October 1920; Genoa, Italy
- Died: 9 November 1996 (aged 76); Bogliasco, Italy
- Occupation: Actress

Fioretta Dolfi (19 October 1920 – 9 November 1996) was an Italian stage and film actress. She died in Bogliasco on 9 November 1996, at the age of 76.

== Selected filmography ==
- The Lady Is Fickle (1942)
- Annabella's Adventure (1943)
- Apparition (1943)
