= Carlo Dapporto =

Italian actor (1911–1989)

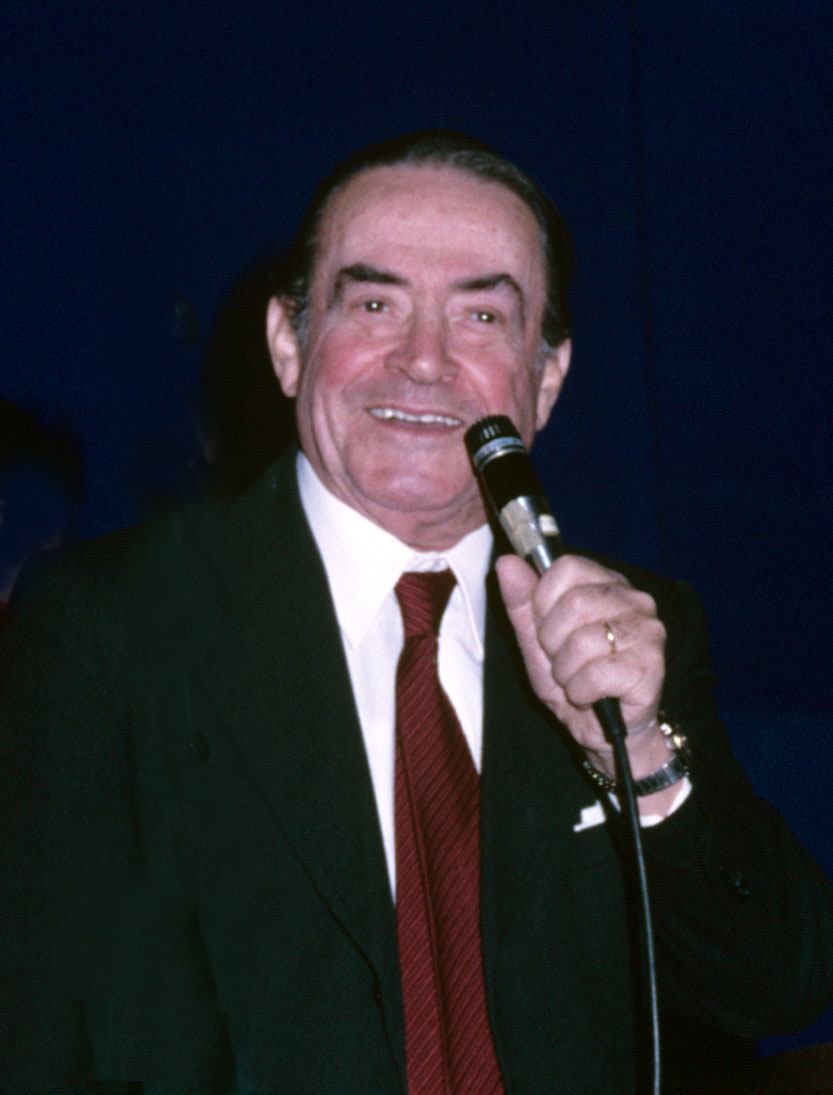
- Dapporto in 1986
- Born: 26 June 1911; Sanremo, Italy
- Died: 1 October 1989 (aged 78); Rome, Italy
- Occupation: Actor
- Years active: 1944−1987

Carlo Dapporto (26 June 1911 – 1 October 1989) was an Italian film actor. He appeared in 35 films between 1944 and 1987. He was born in Sanremo, Italy and died in Rome, Italy.

== Filmography ==
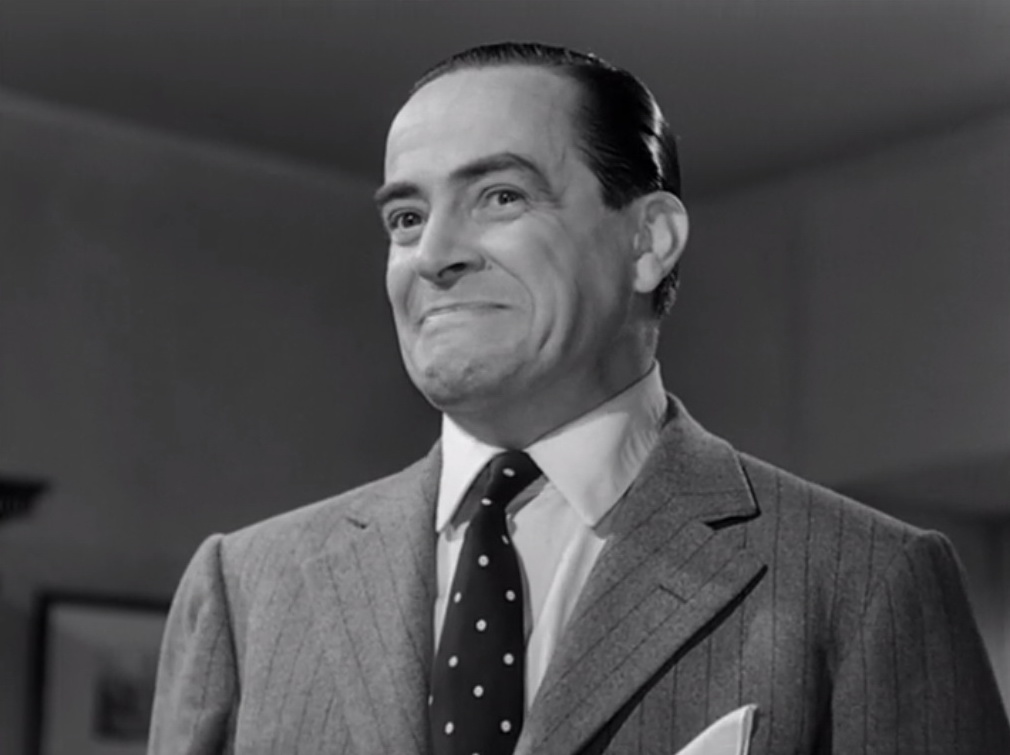
Dapporto as Antonio Badimenti in It Happened at the Police Station (1954)

Year	Film	Role	Notes
1944	In cerca di felicità	Cesarino	
1945	Processo delle zitelle		
1945	Scadenza 30 giorni		
1945	La signora è servita		
1948	Eleven Men and a Ball		
1950	I'm in the Revue		
1950	The Merry Widower	Bebè	
1952	Viva il cinema!	Ferdinando D'Alba	
1952	Canzoni di mezzo secolo		
1952	Mademoiselle Gobete	Cipriano Gaudet, the minister	
1953	Viva la rivista!		
1953	Finalmente libero!	Enrico Rossi	
1953	Ci troviamo in galleria	Ignazio Panizza aka Gardenio	
1954	Via Padova 46	Tancredi	
1954	Laugh! Laugh! Laugh!		
1954	Giove in doppiopetto		
1954	Baracca e burattini		
1954	Angels of Darkness	Vittorio	
1954	The Country of the Campanelli	Lieutenant La Gaffe	
1954	It Happened at the Police Station	Antonio Badimenti	
1955	La moglie è uguale per tutti	Porfirio Della Noce	
1957	Primo applauso		
1957	A sud niente di nuovo		
1958	Fortunella	An Actor	
1961	Scandali al mare	Baron De Camillis	
1961	L'adorabile Giulio		(TV)
1961	Le magnifiche sette	Barone Orso della Portella	
1963	Follie d'estate		
1964	I ragazzi dell'hully-gully		
1964	Biblioteca di Studio Uno: La primula rossa	A nobleman	(TV)
1969	Lisa dagli occhi blu	Agostino - the gardener	
1970	Quelli belli... siamo noi	Luigi 'Gino' Castrosalvo	
1970	Nel giorno del signore		
1973	Polvere di stelle		
1987	Blue Tango	Maestro Zaniboni	
1987	The Family	Giulio, as a man	
1988	Una donna tutta sbagliata		TV mini-series
