= Apparition (1943 film) =

1943 film

- Directed by: Jean de Limur
- Written by: Giuseppe Amato; Aldo De Benedetti; Lucio De Caro; Federico Fellini; Piero Tellini
- Produced by: Giuseppe Amato
- Starring: Alida Valli; Massimo Girotti; Amedeo Nazzari
- Cinematography: Aldo Giordani
- Edited by: Maria Rosada
- Music by: Enrico Cagna Cabiati
- Production company: Società Italiana Cines
- Distributed by: ENIC
- Release date: 23 December 1943
- Running time: 68 minutes
- Country: Italy
- Language: Italian

Apparition (Italian: Apparizione) is a 1943 Italian comedy film directed by Jean de Limur and starring Alida Valli, Massimo Girotti and Amedeo Nazzari. It was shot at Cinecittà Studios in Rome. The film's sets were designed by the art director Piero Filippone.

== Cast ==
- Alida Valli as Andreina
- Massimo Girotti as Franco
- Amedeo Nazzari as Amedeo Nazzari
- Paolo Stoppa as Alberto
- Andreina Pagnani as Zia Ortensia
- Olga Solbelli as Zia Lavinia
- Fioretta Dolfi as Orietta
- Dora Menichelli as Zia Matilde
- Silvio Bagolini as Il fotografo
- Ada Colangeli as Geltrude
- Liana Del Balzo as Susanna, la governante
- Riccardo Fellini as Un amico di Franco
- Leo Garavaglia as Antonio, segretario di Nazzari
- Roberto Mauri as Un amico di Andreina
- Franco Pesce as L'ometto che fa benzina
- Adriana Serra as Un'amica di Andreina

== Bibliography ==
- Brunetta, Gian Piero. The History of Italian Cinema: A Guide to Italian Film from Its Origins to the Twenty-first Century. Princeton University Press, 2009.
- Gundle, Stephen. Mussolini's Dream Factory: Film Stardom in Fascist Italy. Berghahn Books, 2013.
