= Galeazzo Benti =

Italian actor (1923–1993)

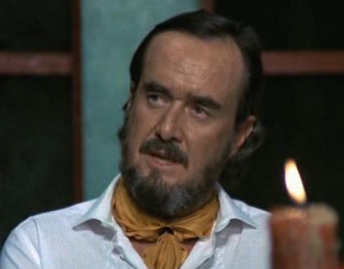
- Born: Galeazzo Bentivoglio; 6 August 1923; Florence, Italy
- Died: 21 April 1993 (aged 69); Bracciano, Italy
- Occupation: Actor
- Years active: 1942–1991

Galeazzo Benti (6 August 1923 – 21 April 1993) was an Italian actor. He appeared in more than 70 films between 1942 and 1991.

== Life and career ==
Born Galeazzo Bentivoglio in Florence, Italy, a descendant of the Bentivoglio family, which ruled Bologna from 1401 until 1506 and from 1511 until 1512, he started his career as a cartoonist and a set designer. He was the step brother of colleague Fiammetta Baralla. After his first roles in 1942, he had his breakout in 1943, in Sergio Tofano's Gian Burrasca, in which he played a frivolous and falsely modest snob, a role he specialized during his career. After successfully alternating between cinema and revue, in the late 1950s he moved to Venezuela, where he worked in a television channel dedicated to Italian immigrants. He came back to Italy in the early 1980s, and here he reprised his acting career equally splitting between films and TV-series until his death from a heart attack in 1993.

== Selected filmography ==
- Souls in Turmoil (1942) - Un amico di Elena
- The Three Pilots (1942) - Andrea Torelli
- The Lady Is Fickle (1942) - Un giovanetto al teatro
- Annabella's Adventure (1943)
- Gian Burrasca (1943) - Tinti, il giornalista
- Gente dell'aria (1943) - Il tenente Prollo
- The Za-Bum Circus (1944) - (segment "Galop finale al circo")
- La freccia nel fianco (1945) - Duccio Massenti
- Life Begins Anew (1945) - Un cliente del ristorante (uncredited)
- Che distinta famiglia! (1945) - The real Michele di Montuja
- Departure at Seven (1946)
- Peddlin' in Society (1946) - Rorò di Torretia
- Il vento m'ha cantato una canzone (1947)
- Flesh Will Surrender (1947) - L'ufficiale di cavalleria
- The Two Orphans (1947) - Giorgio
- Dove sta Zaza? (1947)
- Cab Number 13 (1948) - Le commissaire Portier
- Fear and Sand (1948) - George
- The Dance of Death (1948)
- Accidenti alla guerra!... (1948) - F.23
- Be Seeing You, Father (1948) - Il 'contino'
- Una voce nel tuo cuore (1949)
- The Emperor of Capri (1949) - Dodo della Baggina
- Se fossi deputato (1949)
- Margaret of Cortona (1950) - Arsenio del Monte
- Totò Tarzan (1950) - L'esercitatore dei superparacadutisti
- The Transporter (1950) - Un cliente galante
- The Knight Has Arrived! (1950) - Marchese Bevilacqua
- Milano miliardaria (1951) - Walter
- La paura fa 90 (1951) - Carlo Champignon
- Seven Hours of Trouble (1951) - Ernesto
- Paris Is Always Paris (1951) - Gianni Forlivesi
- Amor non ho! Però, però.. (1951)
- Free Escape (1951)
- Three Girls from Rome (1952) - Marisa's friend
- Toto in Color (1952) - Poldo
- Wife For a Night (1952) - Maurizio
- Altri tempi (1952) - Amante della signora (segment "Il carrettino dei libri vecchi")
- I figli non si vendono (1952)
- Sunday Heroes (1952) - Benti - Lucy's wooer
- Primo premio: Mariarosa (1952)
- Poppy (1952) - Viveur del night
- The Piano Tuner Has Arrived (1952) - Un giornalista
- Canzoni di mezzo secolo (1952)
- Beauties on Motor Scooters (1952) - Gastone
- Fermi tutti... arrivo io! (1953) - Giornalista
- Cavalcade of Song (1953) - Il soldatino
- Viva la rivista! (1953)
- Scampolo 53 (1953)
- Canto per te (1953)
- Matrimonial Agency (1953) - Lodolini
- It Takes Two to Sin in Love (1954)
- Tears of Love (1954)
- Neapolitan Carousel (1954) - French tourist
- Papà Pacifico (1954) - Alberto di Pontenero - the baron
- Angela (1954) - Gustavo Venturi
- An American in Rome (1954) - Fred Buonanotte
- A Free Woman (1954) - Sergio Rollini
- Laugh! Laugh! Laugh! (1954) - Snob
- Toto in Hell (1955) - Il cantante esistenzialista
- Carovana di canzoni (1955) - Mickey Spillone
- Red and Black (1955)
- Yo y las mujeres (1959)
- Il dio serpente (1970) - Bernard Lucas
- Lola (1974) - Doctor
- El enterrador de cuentos (1978)
- La terrazza (1980) - Galeazzo
- Morituri (1984)
- Il commissario Lo Gatto (1987) - Barone Fricò
- Me and My Sister (1987) - Avv. Sironi
- Animali metropolitani (1987) - Dott. Cohen
- Mortacci (1989) - Tommaso Grillo
- Rouge Venise (1989) - Silvio Conio
- Massacre Play (1989) - Cornelius Plank
- Nel giardino delle rose (1990) - Troncucci
- Vacanze di Natale '90 (1990) - Principe Galiberti
- Rossini! Rossini! (1991) - La Rochefoucault
- Count Max (1991) - Conte Max
