= Il richiamo nella tempesta =

- Directed by: Oreste Palella
- Written by: Carlo Guidotti; Oreste Palella
- Produced by: Ezio Lavoretti by Eros Film
- Starring: Silvana Pampanini
- Cinematography: Alfredo Lupo
- Music by: Paul Giugniani
- Release date: 1950
- Country: Italy
- Language: Italian

Il richiamo nella tempesta (i.e. "Call in the storm", also known as Gli amanti dell'infinito and ...E le stelle non attesero invano) is a 1950 Italian melodrama-fantasy film written and directed by Oreste Palella.

== Cast ==
- Silvana Pampanini as Carla
- Renato Baldini as Roberto
- Gabriella Sangro as Dani
- Carlo Tamberlani as Dr. Cianelli
- Barbara Leite as Anna Maria
- Amedeo Trilli as Spirit of the Rose
- Carlo Mazzoni as Fabio
- Elsa Vazzoler as Giulia
- Renato Malavasi as Stefano
- Gigi Gorda as Camillo
- Gina Matelli as Dani's Mother
- Carlo Ghisini as Teodoro
