= Annabella's Adventure =

- Directed by: Leo Menardi
- Written by: Luigi Giacosi; Leo Menardi; Vittorio Metz; Franco Riganti; Guglielmo Santangelo; Steno
- Starring: Fioretta Dolfi; Maurizio D'Ancora; Paola Borboni
- Cinematography: Mario Bava
- Edited by: Fernando Tropea
- Music by: Giovanni D'Anzi; Gino Filippini
- Production company: Alleanza Cinematografica Italiana
- Distributed by: Alleanza Cinematografica Italiana
- Release date: 31 March 1943
- Running time: 85 minutes
- Country: Italy
- Language: Italian

Annabella's Adventure or The Adventure of Annabella (Italian:L'avventura di Annabella) is a 1943 Italian comedy film directed by Leo Menardi and starring Fioretta Dolfi, Maurizio D'Ancora and Paola Borboni.

The film's sets were designed by the art director Virgilio Marchi.

== Cast ==
- Fioretta Dolfi as Annabella
- Maurizio D'Ancora as Roberto
- Paola Borboni as La madre di Annabella
- Enrico Viarisio as Il padre di Annabella
- Amelia Chellini as La madre di Roberto
- Virgilio Riento as Il padre di Roberto
- Cesco Baseggio as Lo zio di Roberto
- Anna Magnani as La mondana
- Guido Barbarisi
- Galeazzo Benti
- Lia Corelli
- Gorella Gori
- Alfredo Martinelli
- Lina Tartara Minora
- Giacomo Moschini
- Stefano Sibaldi
- Gondrano Trucchi

== Bibliography ==
- Moliterno, Gino. The A to Z of Italian Cinema. Scarecrow Press, 2009.
