= Carlo Hintermann =

Italian actor

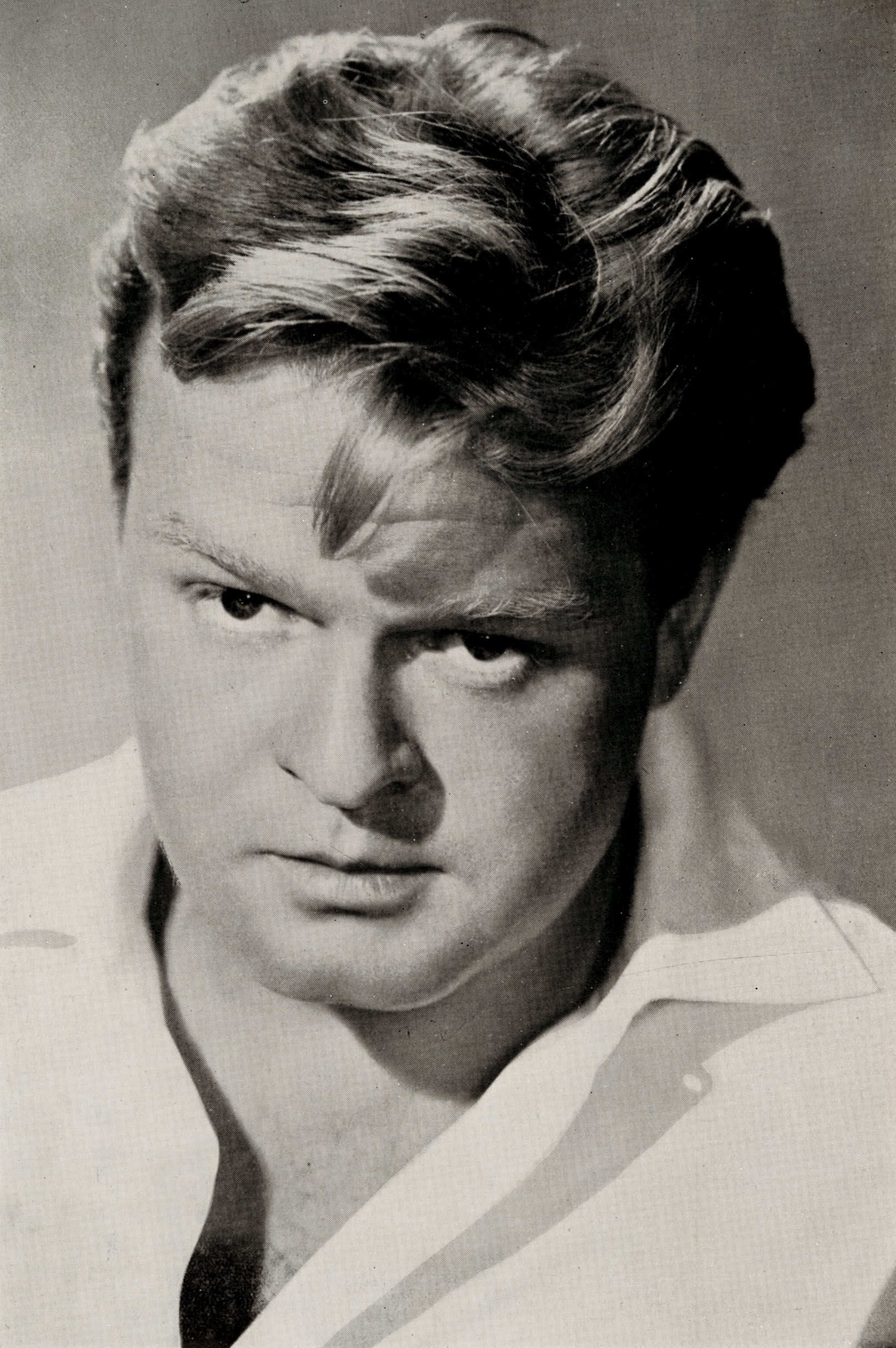
- Born: 2 April 1923; Milan, Italy
- Died: 7 January 1988 (aged 64); Acireale, Italy

Carlo Hintermann (2 April 1923 – 7 January 1988) was an Italian film, television and stage actor and voice actor. He was sometimes credited as Carlo Hinterman.

== Life and career ==
Born in Milan into a family of ancient German origin, Hintermann graduated in law, then enrolled at the Centro Sperimentale di Cinematografia in Rome. After graduation in 1949 he debuted in a secondary role in Domenico Paolella's short film Terra amara, then appeared in a large number of movies and TV-series, usually in character roles. He was also active on stage, debuting in 1957 with a series of monologues that earned him a casting by Vittorio Gassman for Irma la Douce and later for O Cesare o nessuno; notably, he got a personal success with the recital Milanin Milanon, alongside Milly Monti. He died in an accident, run over by a car in Acireale a few hours after a theater performance in Catania.

== Selected filmography ==
- My Beautiful Daughter (1950) - Livio Toschi
- Abbiamo vinto! (1951)
- Shadows on the Grand Canal (1951)
- Brothers of Italy (1952)
- Giovinezza (1952)
- Half a Century of Song (1952)
- La cieca di Sorrento (1953)
- Il viale della speranza (1953) – The Swiss Producer
- Cronaca di un delitto (1953) – Giorgio Stoppani
- Traviata '53 (1953) – Gianpaolo
- Mamma perdonami! (1953)
- Mid-Century Loves (1954) – (segment "Dopoguerra 1920")
- Gran varietà (1954) – il barone Arneta (episodio 'Fregoli')
- Violenza sul lago (1954) – Sergio
- Attila (1954) – Capo della tribu
- Pirate of the Half Moon (1957) – Il ticinese
- The Mighty Crusaders (1957) – Dilone
- Rascel-Fifì (1957) – Tre Dita
- Rascel Marine (1958) – Marine
- Five Branded Women (1960)
- A Breath of Scandal (1960) – Prince Ruprecht
- Pugni, pupe e marinai (1961)
- Avenger of the Seven Seas (1962) – Errol Robinson
- Women of Devil's Island (1962) – Capt. Duval
- The Captive City (1962) – Sergeant
- Stop Train 349 (1963) – Soviet Officer
- La Cittadella (1964, TV Mini-Series) – Denny
- Operation Atlantis (1965) – Prof. Gunther Reisch
- Secret Agent Super Dragon (1966) – Coleman
- Z7 Operation Rembrandt (1966) – Kosky
- L'estate (1966) – Carlo Ribulzi
- Last Man to Kill (1966) – Manfred Simpson
- Wanted (1967) – Judge Anderson
- Tiffany Memorandum (1967) – The Shadow's Agent with furry collar
- Desert Commandos (1967) – Sgt. Erich Huber
- I barbieri di Sicilia (1967) – Colonnello Von Krauss
- A Black Veil for Lisa (1968) – Mansfeld
- Rangers: attacco ora X (1970) – Colonel Davenport
- El último día de la guerra (1970) – Lt. Mueller
- That Little Difference (1970) – Il professore
- Il sasso in bocca (1970)
- Il segno del comando (1971, TV Mini-Series) – Lester Sullivan
- Roma Bene (1971) – Secondo avvocato di Elena
- Brother Sun, Sister Moon (1972)
- Mean Frank and Crazy Tony (1973) – Manca
- Irene, Irene (1975) – Paolo
- Eyes Behind the Stars (1978) – Air Marshal Thompson
- Tanto va la gatta al lardo... (1978) – Filiberto Amedeo Viro Siloni
- Ridendo e scherzando (1978) – Marito di Susy
