= Red and Black (film) =

- Directed by: Domenico Paolella
- Written by: Galeazzo Benti; Oreste Biancoli; Giustino Durano; Dario Fo; Carlo Infascelli; Ruggero Maccari; Giuseppe Mangione; Vinicio Marinucci; Vittorio Metz; Ettore Scola
- Starring: Renato Rascel; Walter Chiari; Rosy Mazzacurati
- Cinematography: Tonino Delli Colli
- Release date: 1955
- Country: Italy
- Language: Italian

Red and Black (Italian:Rosso e nero) is a 1955 Italian film directed by Domenico Paolella and starring Renato Rascel, Walter Chiari and Rosy Mazzacurati.

== Cast ==
- Renato Rascel
- Walter Chiari
- Rosy Mazzacurati
- Carlo Croccolo
- Alba Arnova
- Riccardo Billi
- Carlo Ninchi
- Paola Borboni
- Arnoldo Foà
- Andrea Checchi
- Fulvia Mammi
- Maria Bianconi
- Mimmo Craig
- Diana Dei
- Patrizia Della Rovere
- Arturo Dominici
- Bianca Maria Fabbri
- Franca Gandolfi
- Fanny Landini
- Patrizia Lari
- Sonia Moser
- Franca Rame
- Lilli Scaringi
- Goffredo Spinedi
- Enrico Urbini

== Bibliography ==
- Susanna Buffa. Un musicista per il cinema: Carlo Rustichelli, un profilo artistico. Carocci, 2004.
