= The Lady Is Fickle =

1942 film

- Film poster
- Directed by: Mario Mattoli
- Written by: Leo Catozzo; Marcello Marchesi; Mario Monicelli; Stefano Vanzina
- Produced by: Gaetano Rizzardi
- Starring: Ferruccio Tagliavini; Fioretta Dolfi; Carlo Campanini
- Cinematography: Alberto Fusi; Aldo Tonti
- Edited by: Fernando Tropea
- Music by: Giovanni D'Anzi
- Production company: Grandi Film
- Distributed by: Grandi Film
- Release date: 9 October 1942
- Running time: 76 minutes
- Country: Italy
- Language: Italian

The Lady Is Fickle (Italian: La donna è mobile [la ˈdɔnna ˌɛ mˈmɔːbile]) is a 1942 Italian comedy film directed by Mario Mattoli and starring Ferruccio Tagliavini, Fioretta Dolfi and Carlo Campanini. It was shot at the Cinecittà Studios in Rome. The film's sets were designed by the art director Piero Filippone.

== Plot ==
A poor village teacher has ambitions to be a great singer.

== Cast ==
- Ferruccio Tagliavini as Ferruccio Landini
- Fioretta Dolfi as Rosetta
- Carlo Campanini as Cristoforo
- Carlo Micheluzzi as Il commendator Carlo
- Dora Bini as Isabella
- Arturo Bragaglia as Il direttore della scuola
- Rosina Anselmi as Sua moglie
- Nucci Bagnani as La sorellina di Rosetta
- Galeazzo Benti as Un giovanetto al teatro
- Agnese Dubbini as La cuoca
- Leo Micheluzzi as Il maggiordomo
- Giuliana Pitti as Luisella, sorella di Rosetta
- Agostino Salvietti as Il cuoco
- Margherita Seglin as La madre di Rosetta
- Ciro Berardi
- Alberto Capozzi
- Totò Mignone

== Bibliography ==
- Geoffrey Nowell-Smith & Steven Ricci. Hollywood and Europe: Economics, Culture, National Identity, 1945-95. BFI Publishing, 1998.
