= Violenza sul lago =

1954 film

- Directed by: Leonardo Cortese
- Written by: Cesate Torri; Leonardo Cortese
- Cinematography: Domenico Scala
- Music by: Carlo Innocenzi
- Release date: 7 July 1954
- Country: Italy
- Language: Italian

Violenza sul lago ("Violence in the lake") is a 1954 Italian melodrama film written and directed by Leonardo Cortese.

== Cast ==
- Lia Amanda as Rossana
- Erno Crisa as Marco
- Peter Trent as Dr. Berti
- Carlo Hintermann as Sergio
- Virna Lisi as Laura
- Giacomo Rondinella as Stefano
- Patrizia Della Rovere as Mirella
- Mario Brega
