= The Playgirls and the Vampire =

- Italian theatrical release poster
- L'ultima preda del vampiro
- Directed by: Piero Regnoli
- Written by: Piero Regnoli
- Story by: Piero Regnoli
- Produced by: Tiziano Longo
- Starring: Lyla Rocco; Walter Brandi; Maria Giovannini
- Cinematography: Aldo Greci
- Edited by: Mariano Arditi
- Music by: Aldo Piga
- Distributed by: Film Selezione (Italy)
- Release date: 28 November 1960 (Italy)
- Running time: 83 minutes
- Country: Italy
- Language: Italian
- Box office: ₤72.193 million (Italy)

The Playgirls and the Vampire (Italian: L'ultima preda del vampiro, lit. 'The Vampire's Last Prey') is a 1960 Italian horror film directed and written by Piero Regnoli.

== Plot outline ==
A feckless troupe of exotic dancers and their piano player led by a bumbling manager stumble upon a castle after encountering a ferocious storm. The castle, inhabited by Count Gabor, his assistant, and a vampire, is little refuge for the traveling showgirls as they slowly fall under the spell of the undead demon. Vera, one of the reluctant dancers and the living doppelgänger of the vampire's dead wife, Margherita Kernassy—who has been dead nearly 200 years—becomes the object of affection for Count Gabor and the vampire.

== Cast ==
Cast adapted from the book Italian Gothic Horror Films 1957-1969.

- Lyla Rocco as Vera
- Walter Brandi as Count Gabor Kernassy / the vampire
- Maria Giovannini as Katia
- Alfredo Rizzo as Lucas, the manager
- Marisa Quattrini as Ilona
- Leonardo Botta as Ferrenc
- Antoine Nicos as a caretaker
- Corinne Fontaine as Magda
- Tilde Damiani as Miss Balasz
- Erika Dicenta as Erika di Centa
- Enrico Salvatore as a peasant

== Release ==
Under the title L'ultima preda del vampiro, this film was released in Italy on 28 November 1960 through Film Selezione. The film grossed a total of 72.193 million Italian lira.

Richard Gordon, a producer and distributor of low-budget horror and science fiction films, was looking for European horror films to release in the United States through his company Gordon Films. In 1963, he was invited for a French-language screening of The Playgirls and the Vampire through Janus Films, a New York-based company who specialized in releasing arthouse films. A day after the screening, Gordon phoned Janus' agent in Paris and purchased the film rights while preparing an English-language version of the script with Peter Riethof.

Gordon eventually sold the rights to the film to Joe Solomon of Fanfare Film, who released the film as The Playgirls and the Vampire, promoting it as an adult film. It was released in the United States on 4 July 1963. Later, Gordon released a less explicit version of the film under the title Curse of the Vampire for television audiences.

=== Home video ===
The film was released on DVD by Image Entertainment in the United States on 24 August 1999.

== Reception ==
From contemporary reviews, the Monthly Film Bulletin referred to the film as only being four years old but resembling a film that was 50 years old. The review concluded that it was a "pathetically tatty rehash of vampire clichés" and that the "Acting, direction, and photography are unspeakable". "Tube." of Variety opined that the film was a "strictly second-rate horror melodrama. A totally shop-worn, sex-propelled fang-bat-and-tomb opera."

From retrospective reviews, AllMovie and TV Guide gave the films low rankings rating them 1 1/2 and 1 star out of five respectively.

In his analysis of the film, Louis Paul noted various similarities with Renato Polselli's film, The Vampire and the Ballerina, and with several subsequent Italian productions. He described the film as "satisfying on most levels, including the sexploitive one", and noted it was the first horror film featuring "a group of travelers [...] stranded at a malevolent and evil place", one of the topoi of the genre.

== See also ==
- List of Italian films of 1960
- List of horror films of 1960
