= Glauco Pellegrini =

Italian screenwriter and film director

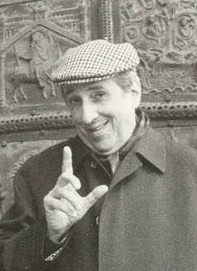
- Born: 14 January 1919; Siena, Tuscany, Italy
- Died: 21 July 1991 (aged 72); Rome, Lazio, Italy
- Occupations: Writer, Director
- Years active: 1945–1964 (film)

Glauco Pellegrini (1919–1991) was an Italian screenwriter and film director.

== Selected filmography ==
- Il monello della strada (1951)
- Shadows on the Grand Canal (1951)
- What Scoundrels Men Are! (1953)
- Ivan, Son of the White Devil (1953)
- Symphony of Love (1954)
- Mid-Century Loves (1954)
- The Most Wonderful Moment (1957)
- L'amore più bello (1958)

== Bibliography ==
- Mitchell, Charles P. The Great Composers Portrayed on Film, 1913 through 2002. McFarland, 2004.
