= It Takes Two to Sin in Love =

- Film poster
- Directed by: Vittorio Cottafavi
- Written by: Franco Perroni
- Produced by: Fortunato Misiano
- Starring: Giorgio De Lullo; Cosetta Greco; Alda Mangini
- Cinematography: Augusto Tiezzi
- Edited by: Jolanda Benvenuti
- Music by: Franco Langella
- Production company: Romana Film
- Distributed by: Siden Film (Italy)
- Release date: 9 January 1954
- Running time: 95 minutes
- Country: Italy
- Language: Italian

It Takes Two to Sin in Love (Italian: In amore si pecca in due) is a 1954 Italian melodrama film directed by Vittorio Cottafavi and starring Giorgio De Lullo, Cosetta Greco and Alda Mangini.

The film's sets were designed by the art director Alfredo Montori.

== Cast ==
- Giorgio De Lullo as Arturo Giorgi
- Cosetta Greco as Luisa Galli
- Alda Mangini as Olga
- Vera Carmi as Bianca Giorgi
- Carlo Lombardi as Armando Giorgi
- Cristina Pall as Lolita
- Rossana Rory as Elvira
- Germana Paolieri
- Anna Arena
- Fiamma Breschi
- Pina Piovani
- Galeazzo Benti
- Gianni Agus
- Mario Siletti
- Mimmo De Ninno
- Carlo Mariotti
- Giulio Battiferri
- Franco Scandurra
- Bruno Smith
- Antonio Nicotra
- Enrico Glori
- Margherita Bossi
- Aldo Vasco
- Antonio Acqua
- Ermanno Adriani

== Bibliography ==
- Moliterno, Gino. Historical Dictionary of Italian Cinema. Scarecrow Press, 2008.
