= The Lost City (1955 film) =

- Directed by: Margarita Alexandre; Rafael María Torrecilla
- Written by: Margarita Alexandre; José Luis Barbero; Mercedes Formica (novel); Rafael María Torrecilla
- Starring: Cosetta Greco; Fausto Tozzi; María Dolores Pradera
- Cinematography: Renato Del Frate
- Edited by: Mercedes Alonso
- Music by: Miguel Asins Arbó
- Production companies: Pico Films; Nervión Films
- Distributed by: Hispano Foxfilms
- Release date: 11 April 1955
- Running time: 83 minutes
- Countries: Italy; Spain
- Languages: Italian; Spanish

The Lost City (Spanish: La ciudad perdida, or Terrorists in Madrid, Italian: Terroristi a Madrid) is a 1955 Italian-Spanish drama film directed by Margarita Alexandre and Rafael María Torrecilla and starring Cosetta Greco, Fausto Tozzi and María Dolores Pradera. It is an adaptation of La ciudad perdida (1953) by Spanish author Mercedes Formica.

The film's sets were designed by Enrique Alarcón.

== Plot ==
Rafael, an ex-exiled republican of the Spanish Civil War, returns to his native city after the years and in the company of his fellow maquis (members of the Resistance) with the mission of carrying out an armed action against Franco's regime. But the mission fails and, in his desperate attempt to escape, Rafael kidnaps a beautiful high class woman.

== Cast ==
- Cosetta Greco as María
- Fausto Tozzi as Rafael
- María Dolores Pradera as Luisa
- Félix Dafauce as Comisario
- Nani Fernández as Sole
- Manolo Morán as Eliseo
- Santiago Rivero as Il Capo
- Alessandro Fersen as Padre de Rafael
- Emma Baron as Madre de Rafael

== Bibliography ==
- Bentley, Bernard. A Companion to Spanish Cinema. Boydell & Brewer 2008.
