= Lyla Rocco =

Italian film actress (1933–2015)

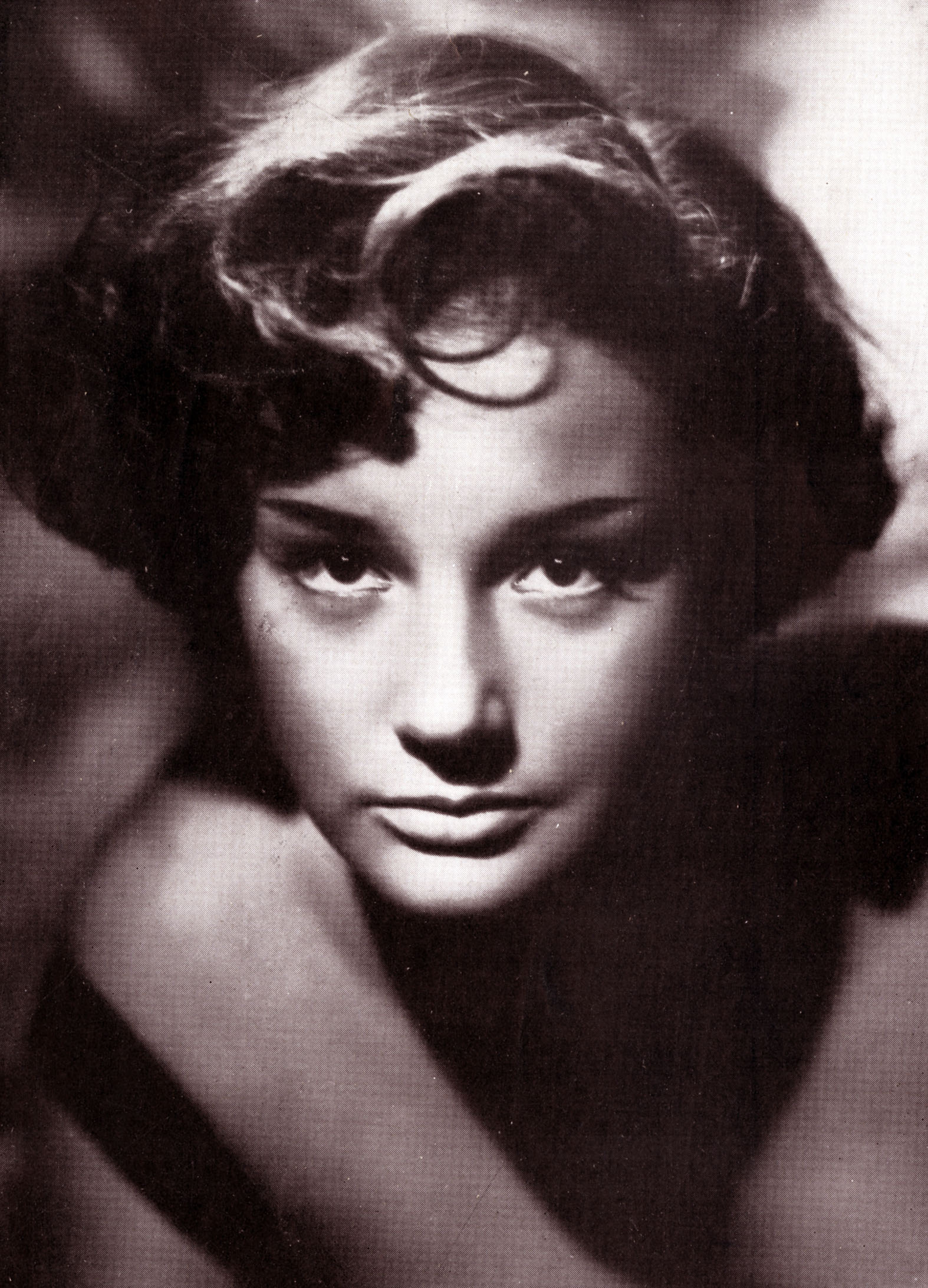
- Born: Maria Luisa Rocco; 18 January 1933; Trieste, Friuli-Venezia Giulia; Italy
- Died: 17 January 2015 (aged 81); Rome, Lazio; Italy
- Occupation: Actress
- Years active: 1951–1964 (film)

Lyla Rocco (18 January 1933 – 17 January 2015) was an Italian film actress. She was also a contestant in Miss Italy. After making her screen debut in 1951, Rocco appeared in over thirty productions before retiring in 1964. In 1954 she played a supporting role in Roberto Rossellini's Journey to Italy. In 1960, in one of her final roles, she appeared in the horror film The Playgirls and the Vampire.

She was married to the actor Steve Barclay.

== Selected filmography ==
- Anna (1951)
- The Lady Without Camelias (1953)
- Journey to Italy (1954)
- High Fashion (1954)
- One Step to Eternity (1954)
- Tripoli, Beautiful Land of Love (1954)
- He Died Fifteen Years Ago (1954)
- Give 'em Hell (1955)
- Songs of Italy (1955)
- The Red Cloak (1955)
- La ladra (1955)
- Burning Fuse (1957)
- No Sun in Venice (1957)
- Young Husbands (1958)
- The Playgirls and the Vampire (1960) a.k.a. The Vampire's Last Victim

== Bibliography ==
- Hogan, David J. Dark Romance: Sexuality in the Horror Film. McFarland, 1997.
- Masi, Stefano & Lancia, Enrico. I film di Roberto Rossellini. Gremese Editore, 1987.
