= Finalmente libero! =

- Directed by: Mario Amendola; Ruggero Maccari
- Written by: Mario Amendola; Ruggero Maccari
- Produced by: Aldo Palmerini
- Starring: Carlo Dapporto; Nadia Gray
- Cinematography: Giorgio Orsini
- Edited by: Nino Baragli
- Music by: Vincenzo Falcomatà
- Production company: Glomer Film
- Distributed by: Zeus Film
- Release date: 1953
- Language: Italian

Finalmente libero! (i. e. "Finally free!") is a 1953 Italian comedy film written and directed by Mario Amendola and Ruggero Maccari and starring Carlo Dapporto and Nadia Gray.

== Cast ==
- Carlo Dapporto as Enrico Rossi
- Nadia Gray as Carla
- Alba Arnova as Simona
- Fulvia Franco as Giuditta
- Luisa Rossi as Silvana
- Marisa Merlini
- Giacomo Rondinella
- Irene Genna as Concetta
- Adriana Facchetti as Margherita
- Guglielmo Inglese
- Enrico Glori
- Ciccio Barbi
- Alberto Sorrentino
- Nino Marchesini
