= Cosetta Greco =

Italian actress

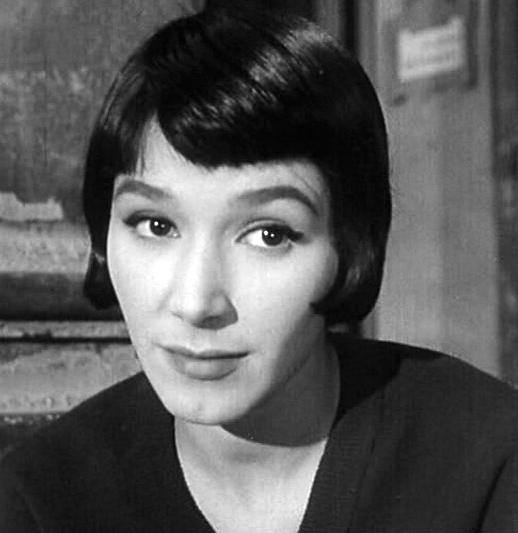
- Greco in 1954
- Born: 8 October 1930; Trento, Kingdom of Italy
- Died: 14 July 2002 (aged 71); Rome, Italy
- Occupation: Actress
- Years active: 1943–1971

Cosetta Greco (8 October 1930 – 14 July 2002) was an Italian film actress. She appeared in more than 30 films between 1943 and 1971.

== Selected filmography ==
- Farewell Love! (1943) – La cameriera di casa Dias
- Caccia all'uomo (1948) – (uncredited)
- The Charterhouse of Parma (1948) – (uncredited)
- The Bride Can't Wait (1949) – Young Nun
- Four Ways Out (1951) – Lina Girosi – moglie di Luigi
- The Cape of Hope (1951) – Minnie Liakim
- Napoleone (1951)
- Three Girls from Rome (1952) – Elena
- The Bandit of Tacca Del Lupo (1952) – Zitamaria
- Article 519, Penal Code (1952) – Clara Martini
- The Enemy (1952) – Marta
- Sunday Heroes (1952) – Mara
- Canzoni di mezzo secolo (1952)
- Il viale della speranza (1953) – Luisa
- Voice of Silence (1953) – Anna Maria
- Cavalcade of Song (1953) – Ex-amante del guappo
- Musoduro (1953) – Anita
- Scampolo 53 (1953)
- It Takes Two to Sin in Love (1954) – Luisa Galli
- Chronicle of Poor Lovers (1954) – Elisa
- Foglio di via (1954) – Lucia
- Napoléon (1955) – Elisa Baccioli
- The Lost City (1955) – María
- Je suis un sentimental (1955) – Alice Gérard
- I pappagalli (1955) – Giulietta
- Wild Love (1956) – Ines
- Dreams in a Drawer (1957) – Lina
- Cronache del '22 (1961)
- Plagio (1969) – Edera
- Sheriff of Rock Springs (1971)
