= Giuseppe Mangione =

Italian screenwriter

- Born: 15 March 1908; Rome, Italy
- Died: 19 September 1976 (aged 68); Rome, Italy
- Occupation: Writer
- Years active: 1942-1976 (film)

Giuseppe Mangione (15 March 1908 – 19 September 1976) was an Italian screenwriter.

== Selected filmography ==
- Headlights in the Fog (1942)
- In the Name of the Law (1949)
- Barrier to the North (1950)
- Against the Law (1950)
- Red Seal (1950)
- Black Fire (1951)
- The Crossroads (1951)
- Son of the Hunchback (1952)
- The Legend of the Piave (1952)
- Tragic Return (1952)
- Cavalcade of Song (1953)
- Jealousy (1953)
- Angels of Darkness (1954)
- Tripoli, Beautiful Land of Love (1954)
- Proibito (1954)
- Wild Love (1955)
- Songs of Italy (1955)
- Red and Black (1955)
- The Widow (1955)
- Andalusia Express (1956)
- Desert Warrior (1957)
- Sheba and the Gladiator (1959)
- Vento del sud (1959)
- Ursus (1960)
- Mole Men Against the Son of Hercules (1961)
- Commando (1962)
- Misunderstood (1966)
- A Man for Emmanuelle (1969)

== Bibliography ==
- Davis, Ronald L. Hollywood Beauty: Linda Darnell and the American Dream. University of Oklahoma Press, 2014.
