= Sunday Heroes =

1952 film

- Film poster
- Directed by: Mario Camerini
- Written by: Franco Brusati; Ennio De Concini; Mario Camerini; Lionello De Felice; Dino Risi
- Produced by: Mario Camerini
- Starring: Raf Vallone; Cosetta Greco; Marcello Mastroianni
- Cinematography: Mario Bava
- Edited by: Adriana Novelli
- Music by: Alessandro Cicognini
- Production company: Rizzoli Film
- Distributed by: Cineriz
- Release date: 30 December 1952
- Running time: 98 minutes
- Country: Italy
- Language: Italian

Sunday Heroes (Italian: Gli eroi della domenica) is a 1952 Italian sports drama film directed by Mario Camerini and starring Raf Vallone, Cosetta Greco and Marcello Mastroianni. It was shot at the Titanus Studios in Rome and on location at the San Siro in Milan. The film's sets were designed by the art director Piero Filippone as well as former Italy national team coach Vittorio Pozzo. It features many players from the A.C. Milan team of the era. Vallone had been a professional footballer before turning to acting.

== Synopsis ==
A struggling team at the bottom of the Serie A standings travel to play A.C. Milan knowing that a defeat will see them relegated. Staying in a hotel ahead of Sunday's game, the various players experience the city in different ways and the club's regular goalkeeper is injured, requiring his place to be taken by the inexperienced, young Marini. Meanwhile Gino Bardi, the club's star striker, is approached via his girlfriend to deliberately throw the game in exchange for a large sum of money.

Despite her pressure, he refuses, but his performance in the first half is poor and the team are trailing by two goals. The team's fans mistakenly believe that he has indeed been bought off. In the interval the team's doctor informs him that tests done the day before show him to be seriously ill and advises him not to return to the pitch, but Bardi insists on going out for the second half. He spearheads the team's recovery, coming from behind to lead 4-3 before he collapses and has to be stretched off. In the final moments Milan are awarded a penalty but Marini, who has had a bad game, miraculously saves it to win the game.

Bardi, recuperating in hospital, is visited by Mariolina the club's secretary who is much better suited to him than his previous girlfriend.

== Cast ==
- Raf Vallone as Gino Bardi
- Cosetta Greco as Mara
- Marcello Mastroianni as Carlo Vagnetti
- Paolo Stoppa as Piero
- Franco Interlenghi as Marini
- Enrico Viarisio as Cerchio, Radio commentator
- Marisa Merlini as Lucy, Wife of Radio commentator
- Guglielmo Barnabò as President
- Sandro Ruffini as Doctor
- Ada Dondini as Aunt Carolina
- Galeazzo Benti as The suitor
- Gianni Cavalieri as Carlo, Brother of Piero
- Erno Crisa as Stefan
- Guido Martufi as 'Lenticchia'
- Elena Varzi as Mariolina
- Franca Tamantini as Annetta
- Giovanna Scotto as Mother of Gino
- Terttù Sandborg as Marica László, the chambermaid
- Maria Pia Trepaoli as Carmela
- Alma Giusi as Renée, Mara's friend
- Cesare Fantoni as Corrupt executive
- Michele Malaspina as Corrupt executive
- Juan Carlos Lamas as Annetta's Fiancé
- Valentino Valli as Footballer
- Florindo Stocchi as Alberto De Michelis - footballer
- Emilio Carton as Footballer
- Aldo Nardi as Footballer
- Carlo Annovazzi as himself
- Lorenzo Buffon as himself
- Lajos Czeizler as Himself
- Gunnar Gren as Himself
- Nils Liedholm as himself
- Vittorio Pozzo as himself
- Gunnar Nordahl as himself
- Omero Tognon as himself

== Bibliography ==
- Foot, John. Calcio: A History of Italian Football. Fourth Estate, 2006.
- Moliterno, Gino. The A to Z of Italian Cinema. Scarecrow Press, 2009.
