= Eleven Men and a Ball =

- Directed by: Giorgio Simonelli
- Written by: Mario Amendola; Gherardo Gherardi; Ruggero Maccari; Marcello Marchesi; Vittorio Metz; Giorgio Simonelli; Vincenzo Talarico
- Produced by: Raimondo Perretta; Luigi Saraceni
- Starring: Carlo Dapporto; Carlo Campanini; Clelia Matania
- Cinematography: Rodolfo Lombardi
- Music by: Cesare A. Bixio; Felice Montagnini
- Production company: Per-Film
- Distributed by: Per-Film
- Release date: 1948
- Running time: 90 minutes
- Country: Italy
- Language: Italian

Eleven Men and a Ball (Italian: 11 uomini e un pallone) is a 1948 Italian sports comedy film directed by Giorgio Simonelli and starring Carlo Dapporto, Carlo Campanini and Clelia Matania.

The film's sets were designed by the art director Saverio D'Eugenio.

== Synopsis ==
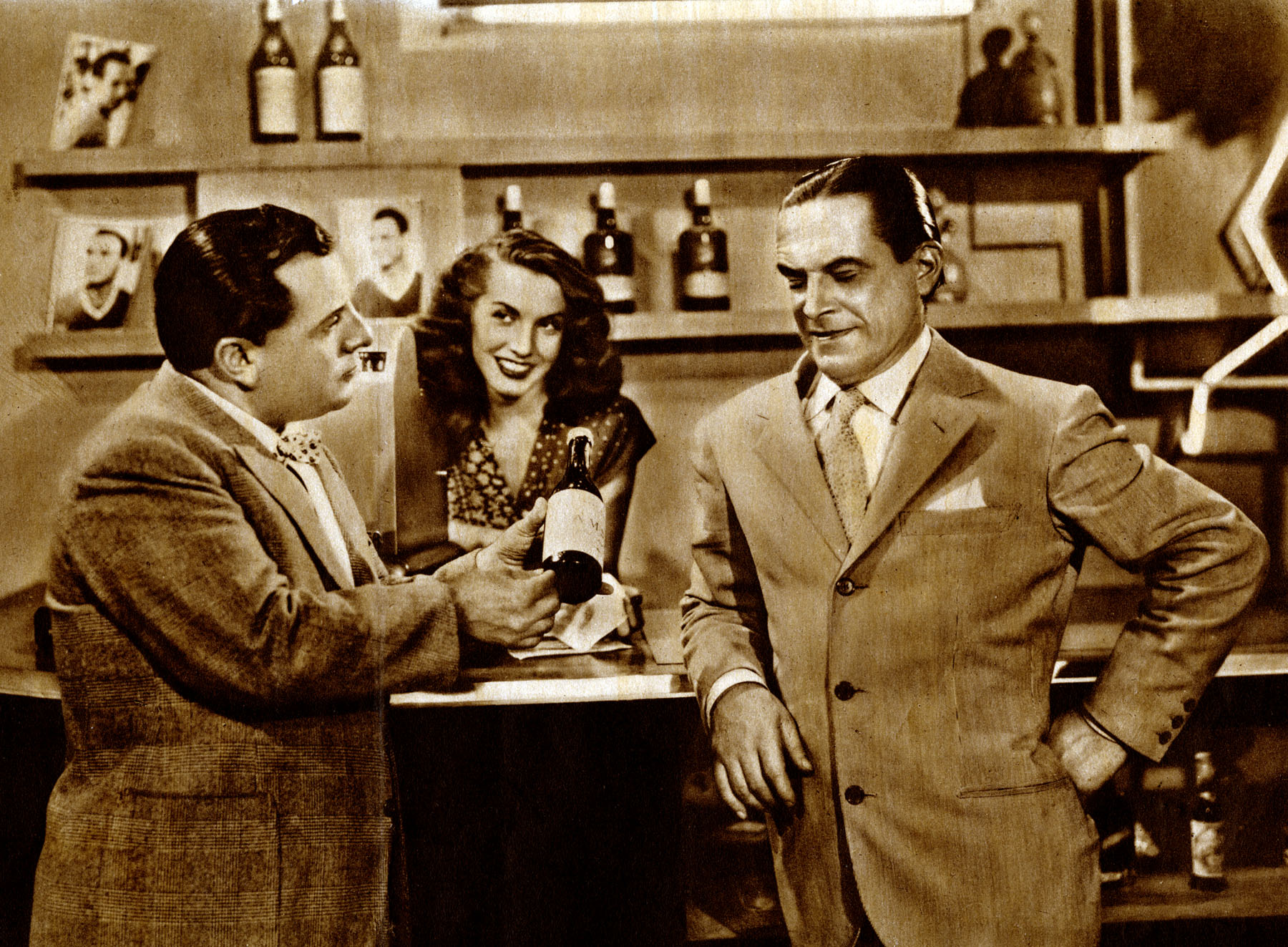

To prevent a gifted player performing for his team in a decisive match, the opposing club go to greatlengths to try to avoid him making it to the game.

== Cast ==
- Carlo Dapporto as Romeo
- Carlo Campanini as Achille
- Clelia Matania as Clelia
- Ernesto Almirante as Il professore
- Adriana Serra as Cassiera bar
- Enrico Luzi as Un barista
- Ferruccio Amendola
- Giorgio Baraghi
- Fiorella Betti
- Arturo Bragaglia
- Bruno Cantalamessa
- Andrea De Pino
- Maria Dominiani
- Georges Flamant
- Fedele Gentile
- Greta Gonda
- Fausto Guerzoni
- Felice Minotti
- Piero Pastore
- Giovanni Petrucci
- Paolo Reale
- Agostino Salvietti
- Octave Senoret
- Bruno Smith

== Bibliography ==
- Chiti, Roberto & Poppi, Roberto. Dizionario del cinema italiano: Dal 1945 al 1959. Gremese Editore, 1991.
