= The Cheerful Squadron =

- Directed by: Paolo Moffa
- Written by: Georges Courteline (play); Suso Cecchi d'Amico; Alessandro Continenza; Michel Audiard; Marcel Camus
- Starring: Vittorio De Sica; Daniel Gélin; Alberto Sordi; Silvana Pampanini
- Cinematography: Václav Vích; Enzo Barboni
- Edited by: Eraldo Da Roma
- Music by: Annibale Bizzelli
- Production companies: Film Costellazione Produzione; Les Films Fernand Rivers; Zebra Films
- Distributed by: Standing Films (France); CEI Incom (Italy)
- Release date: 24 September 1954
- Running time: 90 minutes
- Countries: France; Italy
- Language: Italian

The Cheerful Squadron (Italian: Allegro squadrone, French: Les gaietés de l'escadron) is a 1954 Italian-French historical war comedy film directed by Paolo Moffa and starring Vittorio De Sica, Daniel Gélin, Alberto Sordi and Silvana Pampanini. It is the third adaptation of a story by Georges Courteline about life in the French military in the late nineteenth century.

The film's sets were designed by the art director Gianni Polidori.

== Cast ==
- Vittorio De Sica as the General
- Daniel Gélin as Frédéric d'Héricourt
- Paolo Stoppa as Maresciallo Flik
- Alberto Sordi as Vergisson
- Silvana Pampanini as Albertina
- Charles Vanel as Hurluret
- Luigi Pavese as Capitano medico
- Riccardo Fellini as Bonaparte
- Memmo Carotenuto as Sergente maggiore
- Peter Trent as Lt. Moussent
- Giacomo Furia as Caporale
- Jean Richard as Laperrine
- Oreste Lionello

== See also ==
- The Gaieties of the Squadron (1913)
- Fun in the Barracks (1932)
