= Oreste Biancoli =

Italian screenwriter

- Born: 20 February 1897; Bologna, Kingdom of Italy
- Died: 25 November 1971 (aged 74); Rome, Italy
- Occupations: Screenwriter, film director
- Years active: 1930–1971

Oreste Biancoli (20 February 1897 – 25 November 1971) was an Italian screenwriter and film director. He wrote for more than 90 films between 1930 and 1986. He also directed nine films between 1938 and 1952. He was born in Bologna, Italy and died in Rome, Italy.

== Selected filmography ==
- The Private Secretary (1931)
- One Night with You (1932)
- The Last Adventure (1932)
- Everybody's Secretary (1933)
- The Girl with the Bruise (1933)
- Model Wanted (1933)
- Paprika (1933)
- Just Married (1934)
- Cardinal Lambertini (1934)
- Cavalry (1936)
- Beggar's Wedding (1936)
- Tonight at Eleven (1938)
- At Your Orders, Madame (1939)
- A Thousand Lire a Month (1939)
- The Castle Ball (1939)
- Giarabub (1942)
- The Bandit (1946)
- Fatal Symphony (1947)
- The Great Dawn (1947)
- Heart (1948)
- Christmas at Camp 119 (1948)
- The Flame That Will Not Die (1949)
- Tomorrow Is Another Day (1951)
- Black Feathers (1952)
- Article 519, Penal Code (1952)
- Cavalcade of Song (1953)
- Schiava del peccato (1954)
- Submarine Attack (1954)
- Cardinal Lambertini (1954)
- A Parisian in Rome (1954)
- Songs of Italy (1955)
- Red and Black (1955)
- Desert Warrior (1957)
- Tough Guys (1960)
- Pontius Pilate (1962)
- Le massaggiatrici (1962)
