= Silvana Pampanini =

Italian actress (1925–2016)

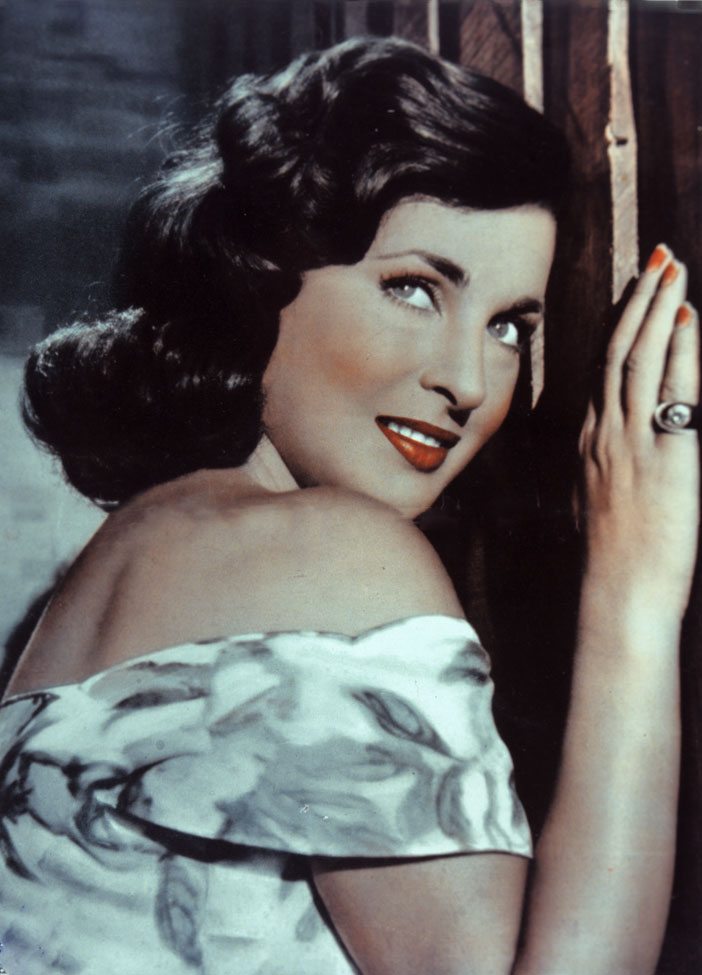
- Pampanini in 1952
- Born: 25 September 1925; Rome, Kingdom of Italy
- Died: 6 January 2016 (aged 90); Rome, Italy
- Occupations: Actress; director; singer; television personality
- Years active: 1946–2002
- Relatives: Rosetta Pampanini (aunt)

Silvana Pampanini (25 September 1925 – 6 January 2016) was an Italian film actress, director and singer. She was also the niece of the soprano of the golden era of opera, Dame Rosetta Pampanini. Silvana Pampanini caused a sensation when she took part in the 1946 Miss Italia contest and the following year she started her movie career. Madame Pampanini was born into a well-off family, she was educated, and studied opera and ballet since her childhood. According to interviews, Pampanini was a contralto with notable voice extension. However, she also said many times over the years that she preferred to pursue a career in cinema as it required less training and it was much less demanding than a career as an opera singer.

== Beauty pageant ==
It was her singing teacher's idea to make her participate in the 1946 Miss Italy contest which had been cancelled during the war. Tall, attractive and self-confident, she was riotously appreciated by the audience, not by the panelists who had to hide themselves and call the police when they selected another girl whose beauty was more sophisticated and less eye-catching. A few days later both contestants were interviewed by the Italian national radio in Rome but the broadcasting was abruptly interrupted when the two young ladies started to quarrel and pull each other's hair. Later Miss Pampanini was wrongly reported as Miss Rome of 1947. A caption in a 1952 newspaper said, "She is considered Italy's all-time beauty." Actually in post-war Italy most young film actresses were selected from beauty pageants. Because of her physical looks and public persona Silvana was compared first to Deanna Durbin, then to Jane Russell.

== Film career ==
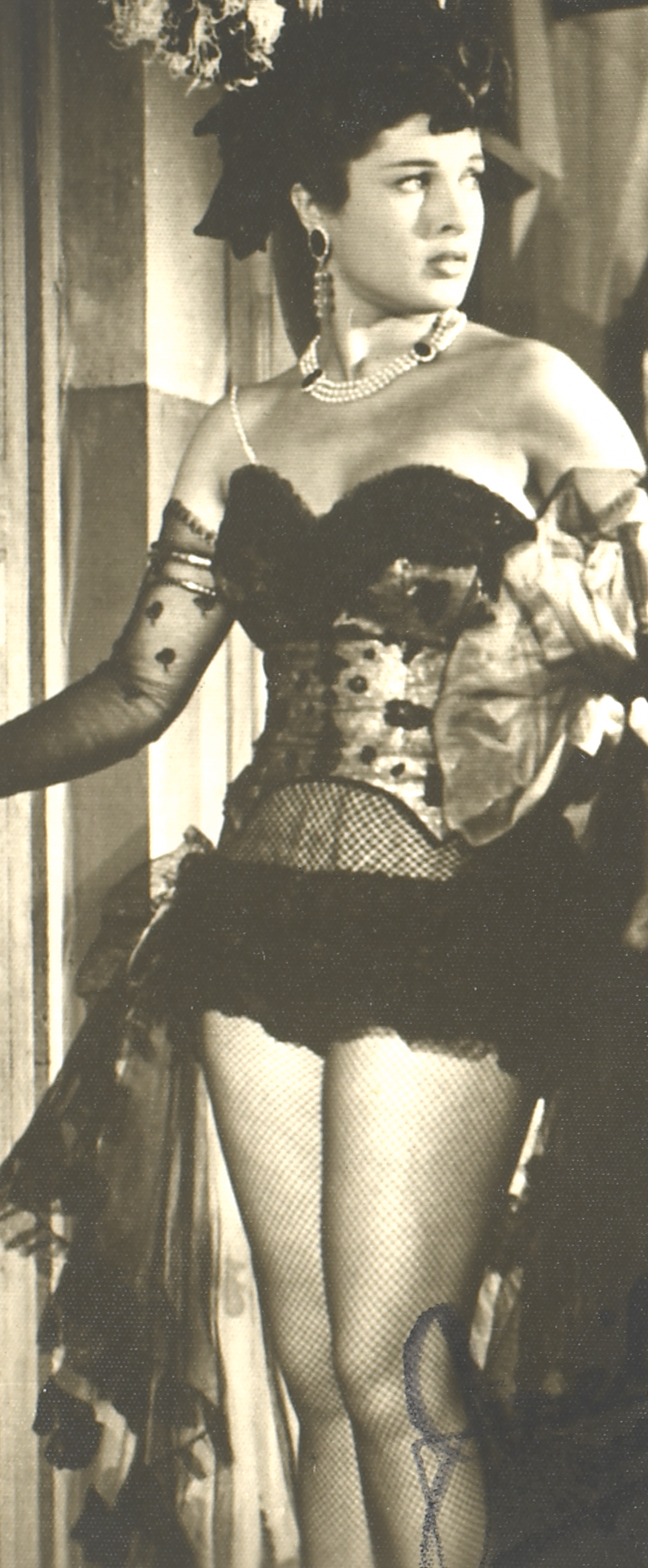
Silvana Pampanini

Green-eyed and long-legged Silvana quickly became one of the most popular pin-up girls and movie stars in her country. She was considered a sex symbol throughout the 1950s. At the start of their career both Gina Lollobrigida and Sophia Loren briefly appeared as extras in some films Pampanini starred in. The Roman curvaceous brunette was usually dubbed when acting but used her own voice when singing. Notably, she could speak fluent French and Spanish, sing, dance, play the piano and she also recorded several songs on 78 rpm vinyl records. Some of her films were screened in the English speaking countries, usually with subtitles.

In a 1952 worldwide publicized press statement she complained that middle-aged Hollywood actors like Clark Gable, Charles Boyer, Spencer Tracy and Ronald Colman were too old to play romantic lovers. The same year she was appointed to welcome Gregory Peck and later Charlie Chaplin who were visiting Rome. In 1953 she also met Humphrey Bogart, Rhonda Fleming and Claudette Colbert, while they were filming in Italy. Two years later Silvana flew to New York City, Denver and Los Angeles, appeared on television but rejected offers from Hollywood because she was told she would have to study English for a long time. In California she visited the Universal and Paramount studios making the acquaintance of Cecil B. De Mille, Yul Brynner, Charlton Heston, Billy Wilder, William Holden and Joan Crawford who were busy on their sets. Playing the real-life part of a glamorous and ever smiling ambassadress of Italian cinema and fashion she travelled extensively all over the world including West Germany, Belgium, Luxembourg, the Scandinavian countries, USSR, Portugal, Greece, Turkey, Yugoslavia, Israel, Egypt, Argentina, Brazil, Venezuela, Uruguay, Cuba, the Dominican Republic, Japan, Tunisia and South Africa. She often appeared on local TV shows and took part in several film festivals as a special guest or panel member. Wherever Silvana went she was personally welcomed by royalty, heads of states, prime ministers, diplomats and dictators, including Juan Domingo Perón, Raul Castro, Marcos Pérez Jiménez, prince and later emperor Akihito, Rafael Trujillo jr., Adnan Menderes, king Farouk, not to mention popes Pius XII and John XXIII.

In her heyday the actress was popular in France where they nicknamed her Ninì Pampan, in Spain where she was cast in Tirma, and in Latin America, especially in Mexico, where she starred in three movies including Sed de Amor with Pedro Armendáriz. Dynamic and sometimes temperamental signorina Pampanini was often involved in arguments and litigations with film producers which eventually jeopardized her career. Nevertheless, she worked with actors and directors such as Vittorio Gassman, Marcello Mastroianni, Alberto Sordi, Totò, Jean Gabin, Henri Vidal, Abel Gance, Vittorio De Sica, Buster Keaton. She turned down a supporting role in a film directed by Federico Fellini because he had asked her to gain weight.

The film O.K. Nero, in which Pampanini played the role of scantily dressed Empress Poppaea, was banned in a few countries because of scenes that were considered indecent. In several countries, including the USA and Sweden, censorship prohibited Tower of Lust, made in France in 1954 and directed by Abel Gance. It was the morbid story a French medieval nymphomaniac queen who has all her lovers killed and nearly commits incest with one of her sons. Despite her risqué film roles and alluring photos published in men's magazines, she never appeared nude. What's more, Pampanini claimed she had always declined the invitations of producers and directors on their sofa, and nobody proved her wrong.

== Threats and controversies ==
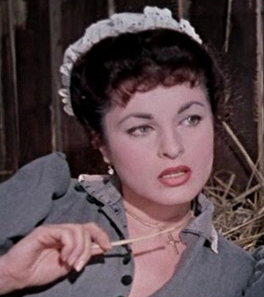
Silvana Pampanini in The Cheerful Squadron, in 1954

In 1954, the actress was sent a letter threatening that her home would be blown up if she did not leave a payment of 8 million lire in her car.

Soon afterward, she went to Spain for three months to make a movie while police and agents of Lloyd's of London investigated the threat. A newspaper article reported that her "bosom [was] insured with Lloyd's for $48,000."

Silvana's lawyers were definitely busy. In 1955, an influential Jewish Greek-born producer, a former fiancé, took legal action against Miss Pampanini because he wanted her to return his valuable engagements gifts, but he finally lost the case. In 1957, the already declining movie star sued a Roman duchess whose dog had bitten her leg during a spring walk in the Parioli district and asked for a one million lire compensation. At the 1958 Venice Lido Film Festival, the actress beat a female journalist who had been unkind to her in a magazine article. One year later, Pampanini was taken to court for contract breach by a Mexican producer who specifically applied for a female judge expected to be indifferent to her charms.

== Personal life ==
Although she had countless admirers and passionate suitors, Silvana never married and had no children. In 1947 she dated Tyrone Power while he was shooting a film in Rome and one year later she abruptly terminated Orson Welles' unsophisticated courtship with a couple of slaps on his face. In 1951 she rejected the marriage proposal made by Totò, one of the most popular actors in Italy at the time, mainly because he was older than her father. The press often announced that Miss Pampanini had a new boyfriend who was going to lead her to the altar at last, but none of them succeeded. In 1959 she also had a brief love affair with American TV personality George DeWitt.

In her autobiography Outrageously Respectable, published in her country in 1996, she wholeheartedly compared herself to Ava Gardner because of their similar physical appearance, and to Greta Garbo because they both received no eminent awards for their acting careers. In late October 2015, a few weeks after turning 90, Silvana was hospitalized and underwent abdominal surgery, but never recovered.

In compliance with her last will she was buried in a white coffin and her gravestone was decorated with the inscription SILVANA FOREVER. Hundreds of Pampanini's personal belongings — furniture and silverware items, paintings, portraits, marble and bronze busts, jewels, books signed by the authors, elaborate clothes, luxurious evening dresses, old fashioned fur coats, and autographed photos — were sold at an auction in Rome two months after her death. In April 2021 her passport was sold on an Internet website for 700 euros.

== Filmography ==
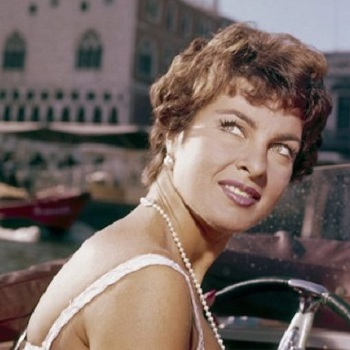
Pampanini at the 1957 Venice Film Festival

=== Actress ===
- Apocalipse (1947) – uncredited
- Il segreto di Don Giovanni (1947) – Anna Tancredi
- Baron Carlo Mazza (1948) – Rosa Pezza
- Be Seeing You, Father (1948) – Chornette
- Anthony of Padua (1949) – Anita – madre di Ferdinando
- The Firemen of Viggiù (1949) – Fiamma
- Marechiaro (1949) – Silvana Di Gennaro
- Snow White and the Seven Thieves (1949) – Eleonora
- The Force of Destiny (1950)
- Hawk of the Nile (1950) – Leila
- The Elusive Twelve (1950) – Clara
- The Transporter (1950) – Mirella
- The Knight Has Arrived! (1950) – Carla Colombo
- 47 morto che parla (1950) – Madame Bonbon, la canzonettista
- Il richiamo nella tempesta (1950)
- Beauties on Bicycles (1951) – Silvana
- I'm the Capataz (1951) – Rosa de Fuego
- Miracle in Viggiù (1951) – Pinuccia
- La paura fa 90 (1951) – Luisa Bonneur
- O.K. Nerone (1951) – Empress Poppea
- Una bruna indiavolata! (1951) – Chiara
- Tizio, Caio, Sempronio (1951)
- Era lui... sì! sì! (1951) – Herself
- Ha fatto 13 (1951)
- The Adventures of Mandrin (1952) – Rosetta
- The City Stands Trial (1952) – Liliana Ferrara
- The Woman Who Invented Love (1952) – Antonella
- Girls Marked Danger (1952) – Lucia
- Mademoiselle Gobette (1952) – Gobette, la soubrette
- Half a Century of Song (1952)
- Viva il cinema! (1952) – Herself
- Storms (1953) – Daisy Parnell
- Koenigsmark (1953) – La grande-duchesse Aurore de Lautenburg
- The Enchanting Enemy (1953) – Silvia Albertini
- A Husband for Anna (1953) – Anna Zaccheo
- Cavalcade of Songs (1953) – La dattilografa
- Vortice (1953) – Elena Fanti
- Noi cannibali (1953) – Virginia
- A Day in Court (1954) – Luisa Ciccinelli
- Mid-Century Loves (1954) – Susanna (segment "Dopoguerra 1920")
- La peccatrice dell'isola (1954) – Carla
- Marriage (1954) – Elena Ivanovna Popova, la vedova
- Schiava del peccato (1954) – Mara Gualtieri
- The Cheerful Squadron (1954) – Albertina, la camiera del maggiore
- Orient Express (1954) – Beatrice Landi
- The Island Princess (1954) – Guayamina
- La torre di Nesle (1955) – Marguerite de Bourgogne
- The Belle of Rome (1955) – Nannina
- Racconti romani (1955) – Maria
- Canzoni di tutta Italia (1955)
- Kyriakatikoi iroes (1956) – Silvana Pampanini
- Law of the Streets (1956) – Wanda
- Saranno uomini (1957) – Sara
- The Road a Year Long (1958) – Giuseppina Pancrazi (Katarina)
- Sete d'amore (1959) – Maria
- Guns of the Black Witch (1961) – Delores
- Oh Islam (1961) – Shajar al-Durr
- Mariti a congresso (1961)
- Il Gaucho (1964) – Luciana
- Napoleoncito (1964) – Silvana Montejo
- Mondo pazzo, gente matta (1965) – Ruth
- Tres mil kilometros de amor (1966) – Marcela
- Mazzabubù...quante corna stanno laggiù (1971) – La "marchettara"
- Il tassinaro (1983) – Herself

=== Film director ===
- Melodie a Sant'Agata (1958)
