= Erno Crisa =

Italian actor (1914–1968)

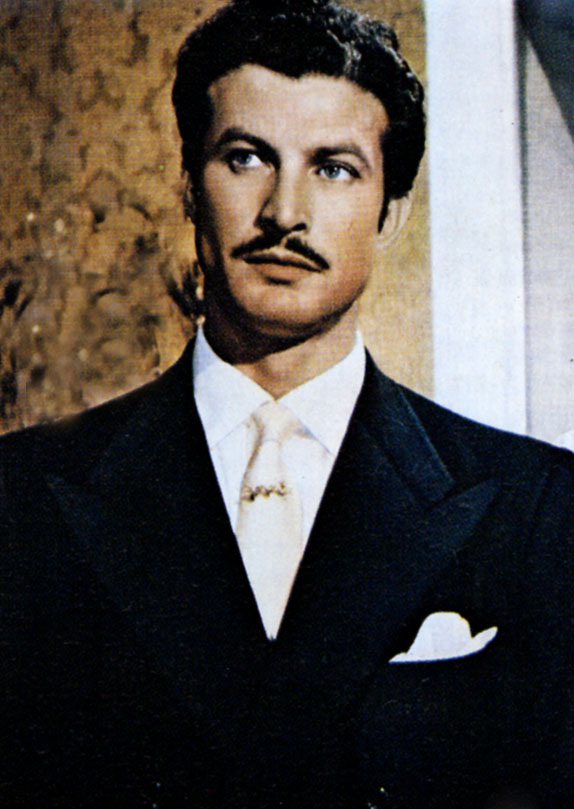
- Born: 10 March 1914; Bizerte, French Protectorate of Tunisia
- Died: 4 April 1968 (aged 54); Rome, Italy
- Occupation: Actor
- Years active: 1944-1968

Erno Crisa (10 March 1914 – 4 April 1968) was an Italian film actor. He appeared in more than 50 films between 1944 and 1968. His last film was the spaghetti western Sugar Colt.

== Partial filmography ==
- Sideral Cruises (1942) - L'homme sur le manège (uncredited)
- Coup de tête (1944) - (uncredited)
- St. Val's Mystery (1945) - Dédé - le vagabond
- The Last Judgment (1945)
- Christine se marie (1946)
- Les gueux au paradis (1946)
- La figure de proue (1948) - Le Guen
- Scandale (1948)
- The White Line (1950) - Stefano
- The Last Sentence (1951) - Roberto
- Messalina (1951) - Timo / Timus
- The Counterfeiters (1951) - Pietro
- Sunday Heroes (1952) - Stefan
- Papà ti ricordo (1952)
- La colpa di una madre (1952) - Alberto
- Canzoni di mezzo secolo (1952)
- Jealousy (1953) - Baron Antonio
- Cavalcade of Song (1953) - Il guappo
- Violenza sul lago (1954) - Marco
- Mata Hari's Daughter (1954) - Prince Anak
- Cañas y barro (1954) - Jaime
- The Gold of Naples (1954) - Don Nicola (segment "Teresa")
- Questi fantasmi (1954)
- Di qua, di là del Piave (1954)
- La Tierra del Fuego se apaga (1955)
- Lady Chatterley's Lover (1955) - Oliver Mellors
- Don Juan (1956) - Don Juan
- La fille de feu (1958) - Larry Gordon
- Caterina Sforza, la leonessa di Romagna (1959) - Cesare Borgia
- The Black Archer (1959) - Lodovico
- Due selvaggi a corte (1959) - Marco Venier
- I mafiosi (1959) - Turi
- Carthage in Flames (1960) - Asdrubak
- The Cossacks (1960) - Kasi
- Purple Noon (1960) - Inspector Ricordi
- Cleopatra's Daughter (1960) - Kefren - Tegi's Councillor
- The Bacchantes (1961) - Atteon
- Maciste contro lo sceicco (1962) - The Sheik
- Julius Caesar Against the Pirates (1962) - Silla
- Passport for a Corpse (1962) - Walter
- Taras Bulba, the Cossack (1962)
- Colossus of the Arena (1962) - Oniris
- Le due leggi (1962)
- Goliath and the Sins of Babylon (1963) - Morakeb
- Brennus, Enemy of Rome (1963) - Decio Vatinio
- Le fils de Tarass Boulba (1964)
- Vengeance of the Vikings (1965) - Eyolf
- Seven Rebel Gladiators (1965) - Morakeb
- Kommissar X – Drei gelbe Katzen (1966) - Baker
- Sugar Colt (1966) - Yonker
- Pecos Cleans Up (1967)
- Angelique and the Sultan (1968) - Turkish Ambassador
