= Carlo Infascelli =

Italian film producer, screenwriter and film director (1913–1984)

- Born: 1 January 1912; Rome, Italy
- Died: 30 October 1984 (aged 72); Rome, Italy
- Occupation(s): Director; Screenwriter

Carlo Infascelli (31 August 1913 - 30 October 1984) was an Italian producer, director, screenwriter and journalist.

== Life and career ==
Born in Rome, Infascelli started his career as a producer in the early 1940s. Shortly after the end of the World War II, following a journey to Sweden he bought the rights to import and distribute several 1930s and 1940s Swedish films in Italy, and from then he started an intense activity of importer, making the Italian audience discover directors such as Ernst Lubitsch, G. W. Pabst and Robert Siodmak. In the 1950s, starting from Half a Century of Song, he got large success with a series of musical anthology comedy films directed by Domenico Paolella. Starting from 1963 he also wrote and directed a number of films, mainly comedies. He abandoned the cinema industry in 1977, following the death of his son Roberto.

== Selected filmography ==
- Cavalcade of Song (1953)
- Laugh! Laugh! Laugh! (1954)
- Red and Black (1955)
- Songs of Italy (1955)
