= Ferrania =

Italian photographic film manufacturer

FILM Ferrania s.r.l.
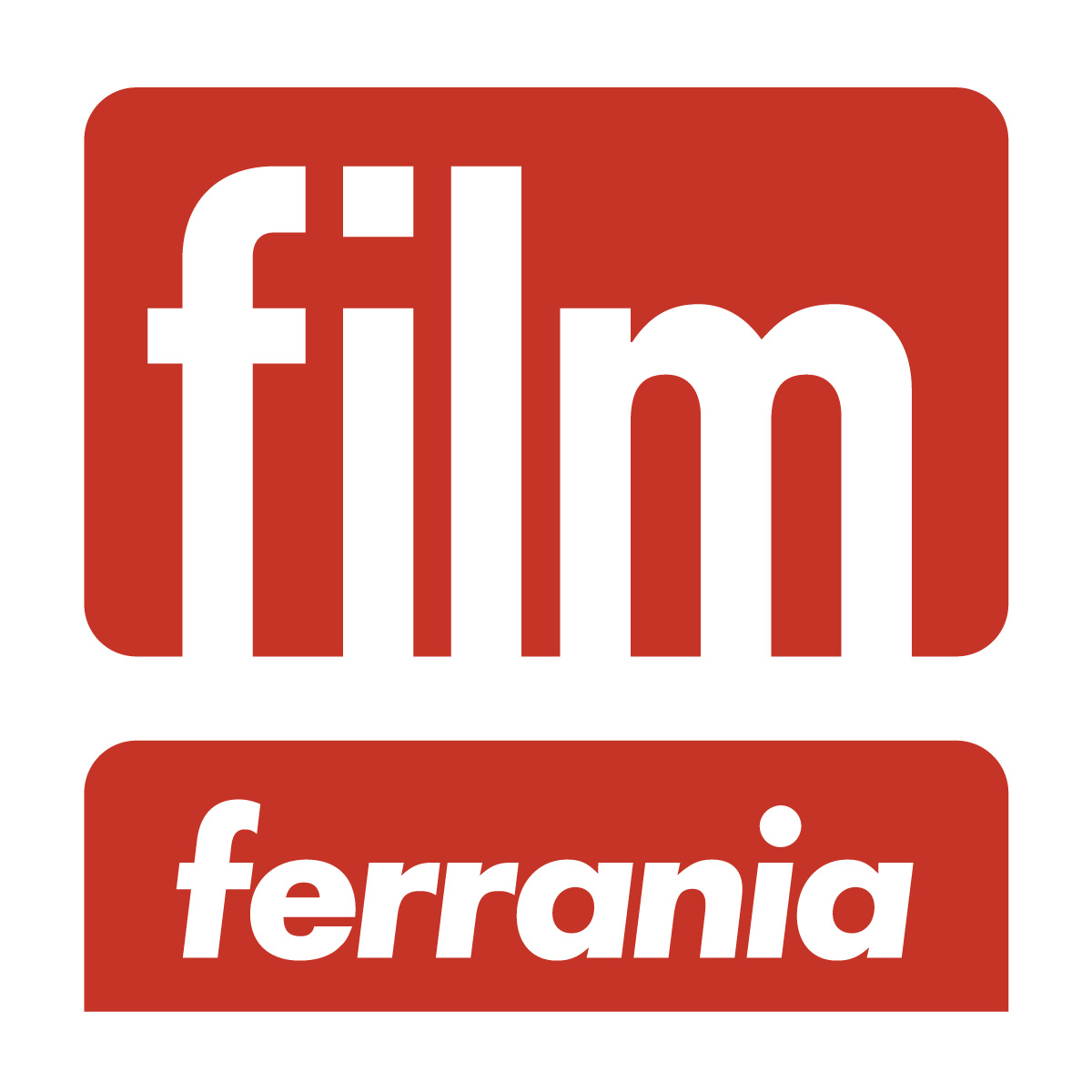
- Type: private company
- Industry: Chemicals, manufacturing
- Founded: 1913
- Headquarters: Cairo Montenotte (SV), Italy
- Products: Film
- Website: FILM Ferrania

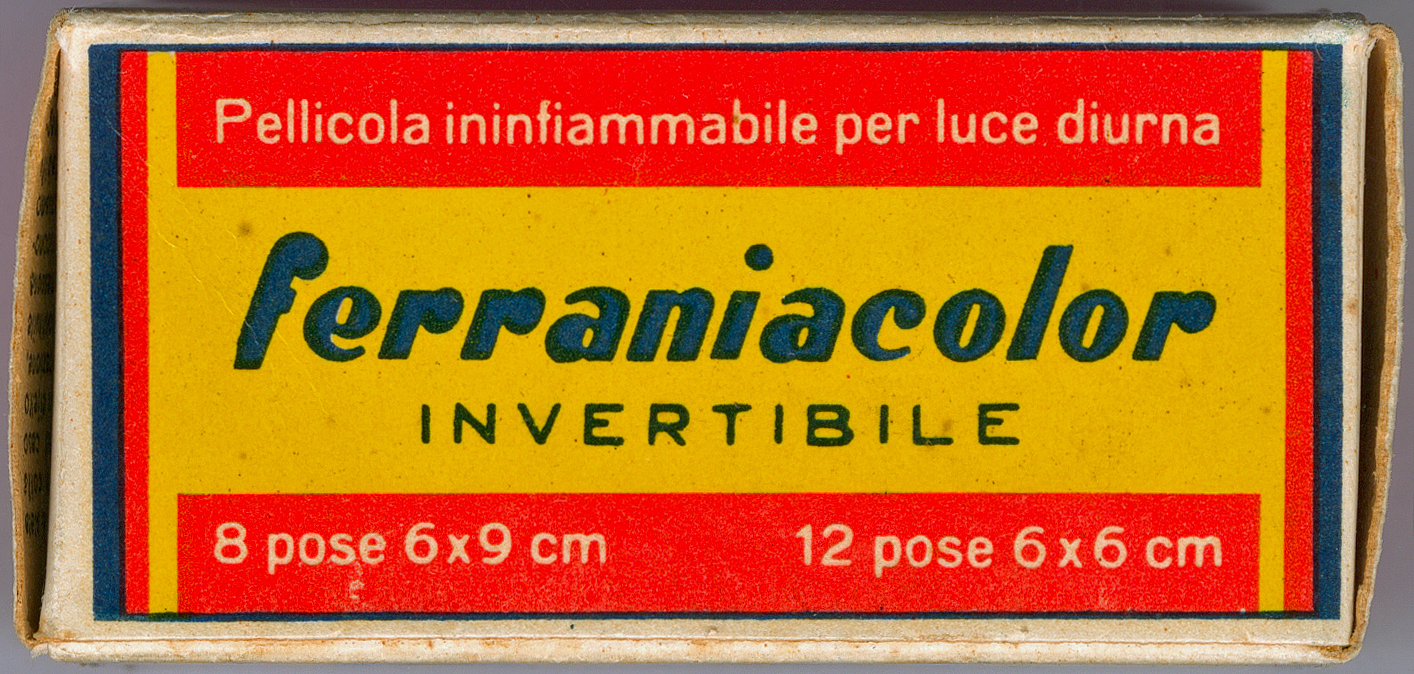
Package of the Ferraniacolor reversal roll film type 120 produced by Ferrania S.p.A. in the 1950s

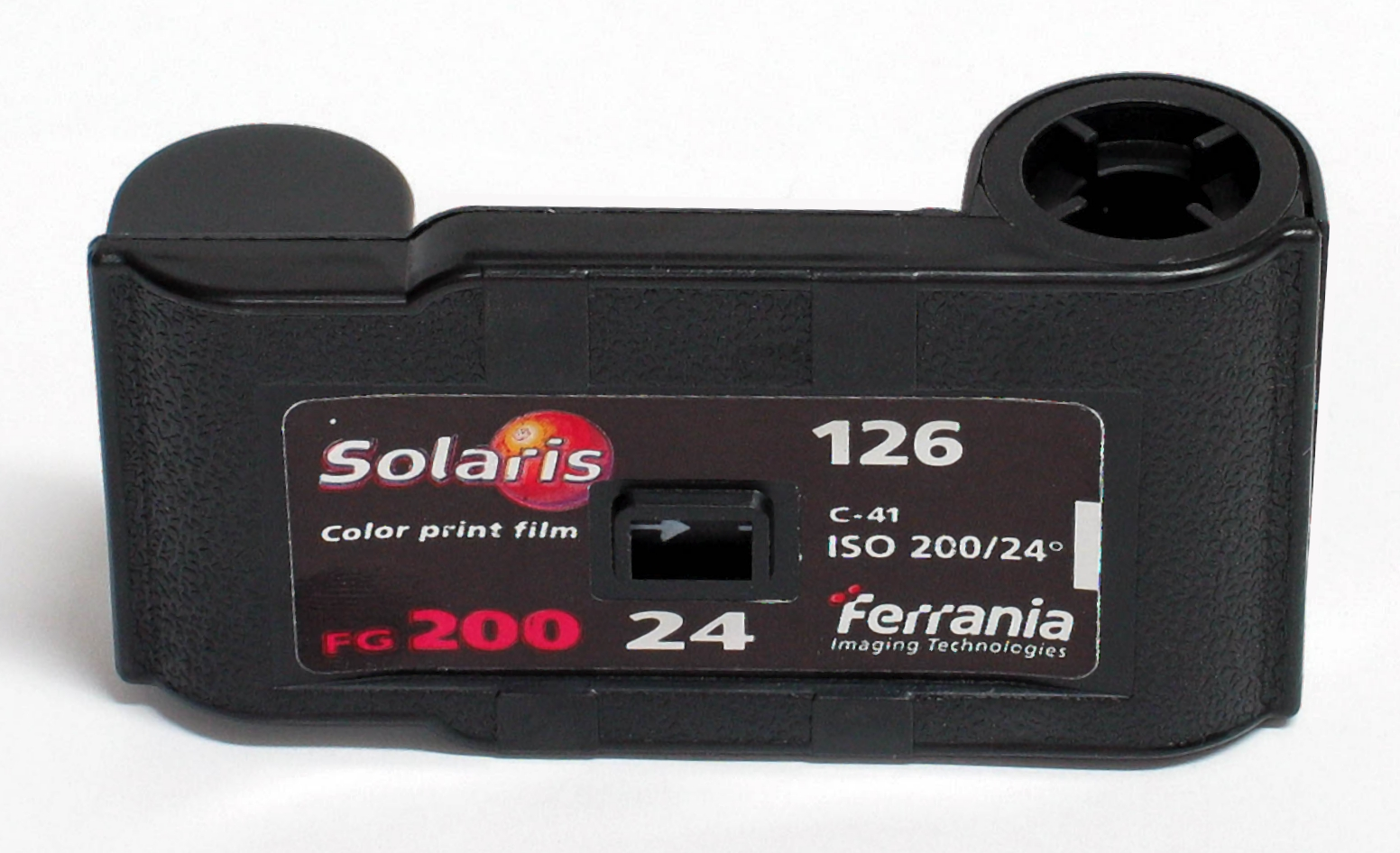
Ferrania 126-format photographic film cartridge

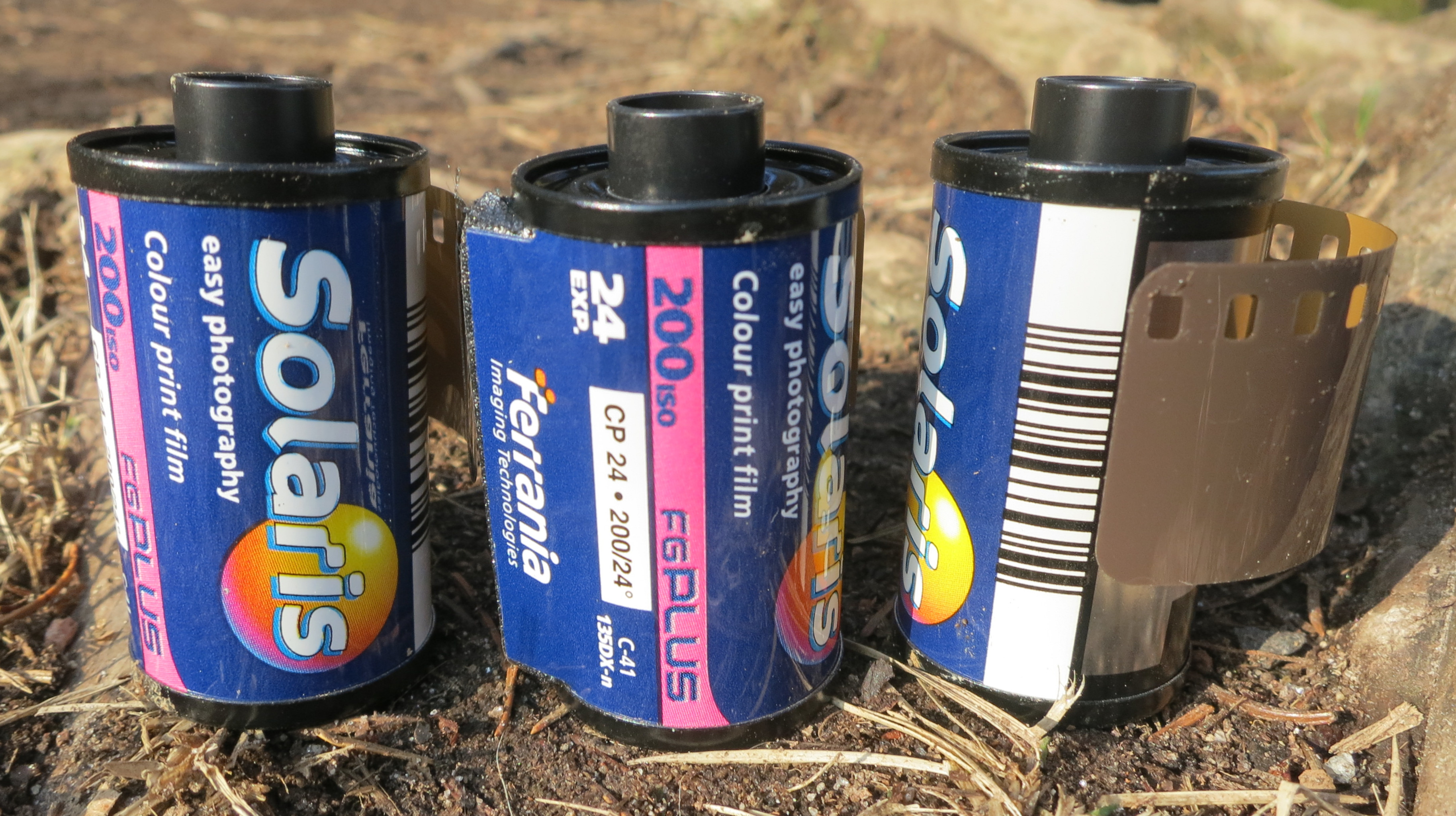
Ferrania Solaris 200 ASA 35 mm film

FILM Ferrania s.r.l. is a photographic film manufacturing company located in Ferrania (Liguria), Italy. Ferrania was founded in 1923 as a maker of photographic film, papers, and photographic equipment, including cameras. The company was purchased in 1964 by the 3M company to become Ferrania 3M, until it was spun off in 1996 to 3M's Imation division. In 1999, Ferrania was acquired by Schroder Ventures and then spun off as a separate company. Subsequently, it was acquired by a Genoese shipping company, Gruppo Messina (Ignazio Messina & Co. S.p.A.) who ceased photographic activities in 2009.

The company was re-founded in 2013 as FILM Ferrania to build a new film manufacturing base using a small portion of the historic campus.

== History ==
=== Original Ferrania ===
The roots to the Ferrania company lie with the 1882-founded explosives manufacturer SIPE (Società Italiana Prodotti Esplodenti, "Italian Society of Explosive Products"). World War I saw a wide extension of business for SIPE, including the establishment of a new plant situated in the Ferrania hamlet of Cairo Montenotte. With the production and chemical properties of explosives and early film being very similar, towards the end of the war in 1917 SIPE founded a subsidiary called FILM (Fabbrica Italiana Lamine Milano, "Italian Lamination Factory, Milan") co-owned by the French Pathé Brothers, which effectively became the film company Ferrania, founded in 1923.

In 1932, Ferrania acquired the Milanese photographic plate manufacturer Cappelli, to temporarily become Cappelli-Ferrania, and soon after also Tensi, the city's other large photographic plate manufacturer, before renaming itself back to just Ferrania in 1938. Ferrania's widest expansion and peak in popularity came in the post-World War II era after 1945, producing films such as Ferraniacolor or the black-and-white Pancro 30 (P30) used by famous Italian directors such as Pier Paolo Pasolini, Vittorio De Sica or Federico Fellini for many of their films. In the later years following the 1964 acquisition by 3M and as part of Imation, the company manufactured and sold photographic film under the Solaris, Dynachrome, and Scotch Chrome brands, as well as hundreds of private label products. Up until 2007, Ferrania remained the only manufacturer of 126 “Instamatic” films after Kodak discontinued them in 1999.

In July 2008, the company's President announced to its unions that manufacture of color film products would cease in December 2008, although as late as March 2009, Ferrania customer service stated that they were still producing 135 format color film in 200 and 400 ASA. However, all manufacture of photographic film had ceased by the end of that year, and the last building was locked down in 2010. In October 2012, Ferrania laid off 198 out of 230 employees formerly working in the manufacture and processing of film.

=== FILM Ferrania ===
In 2013, the former Ferrania Research Laboratory (L.R.F.) and its narrow film coater was acquired by the new company FILM Ferrania s.r.l. which also took over some of Ferrania's manufacturing equipment, materials and documentation, as well as a number of those Ferrania technicians laid off in 2012. FILM Ferrania inherited the historic brand Ferrania to launch analog products suitable for the actual needs of the cine/photo market. In 2013, FILM Ferrania announced an intention to produce new versions of the historic Solaris FG-100 Plus color negative film and Scotch Chrome 100 color slide film in a variety of formats, with a potential emphasis on cine film. In an interview, Nicola Baldini, chief of the new company, stated his intention of also bringing back black-and-white films, especially the historical Ferrania P30.

On November 19, 2013 Film Ferrania presented the main core of production and R&D, formed by eight people with years of experience in the field, who are listed by their names, biography, and photos, on the company's website. In September 2014, Film Ferrania, after an online survey, announced a crowdfounding on the platform Kickstarter to obtain $250,000 from the founders to buy some machines from the old plant of Ferrania. On October 29, 2014 Film Ferrania terminated the fundraising campaign reaching $322,420 (128% of the original target), and announced that as a prize for the donations, they will send films of the first batch of 35mm, 120, super8 and 16mm test rolls based on the original Scotch Chrome 100.

However, Film Ferrania suffered numerous production delays due to asbestos discoveries, and numerous infrastructural issues. In late 2015, FILM Ferrania CEO Baldini told German magazine Cine 8-16 that the new time schedule was to start the first test batch to send to donators by spring 2016, which will include a line of color reversal films based on ScotchChrome in the ISO speeds and color balances of 64D, 100D, 200D, 400D, 640T, and 800/3200T, in the formats of 135 and 120 for still photography, as well as Super8 and 16mm. Later, a negative line based on the Solaris stock will follow in speeds of 100, 200 and 400 ISO. To date, however, none of Ferrania's color products nor their motion picture products have been realized, and no further mention of them can be found on the website.

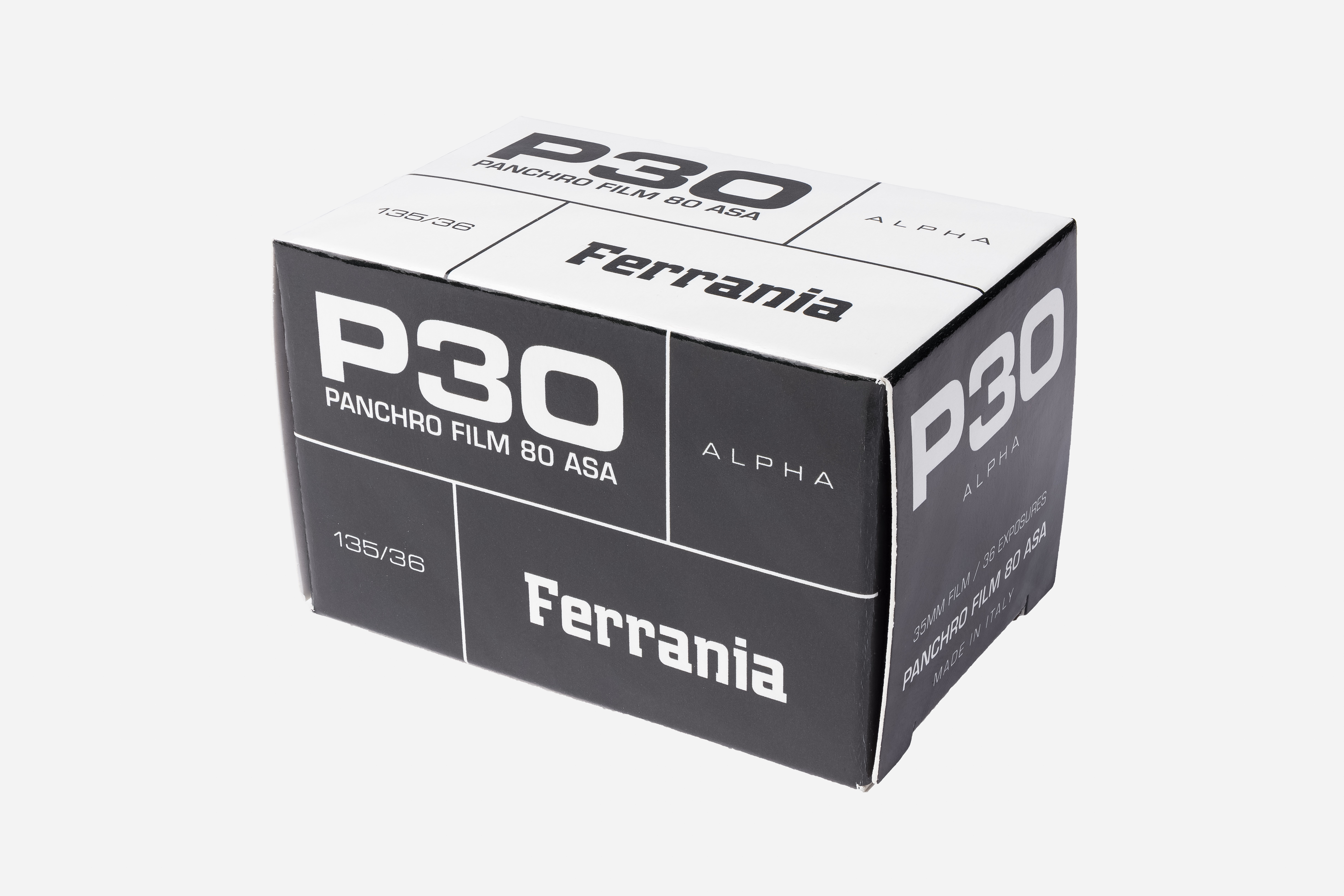
A box of P30 alpha

On February 1, 2017 FILM Ferrania presented a new black and white film – P30 Alpha. It is a panchromatic, 80 ASA speed film with a very high silver content, based on the old formula used to produce cinematographic films. Although the first film produced by FILM Ferrania was supposed to be a color reversal film, company decided to produce a test batch of black and white film to test the restored machines used to produce film. After seeing the results from the test batch company owners decided to release the P30 as an alpha version, to be improved upon based on user feedback. In early December 2019, Film Ferrania announced the availability of the final version of P30 to customers from North America.

On April 2, 2023 FILM Ferrania announced their new 50 ASA speed film orto, similar to P30 but Ortochromatic.

In February 2024 Film Ferrania announced their new 160 ASA speed film P33, more flexible than P30.

In April 2025 it was announced that FILM Ferrania had been acquired by the owner of ORWO, Jake Seal, and would be continuing production, including a planned expansion.

== Products ==
- Ferrania P30 135-36 and 120 – 80 ISO/ASA panchromatic black & white film for medium format and 35mm cameras
- Ferrania P33 135-36 – 160 ISO/ASA panchromatic black & white film for 35mm cameras
- Ferrania Orto 135-36 and 120 – 50 ISO/ASA orthochromatic black & white film for medium format and 35mm cameras

== See also ==
- List of Italian companies
- List of photographic films
- List of discontinued photographic films
