= Rosalba, la fanciulla di Pompei =

1952 Italian film by Natale Montillo

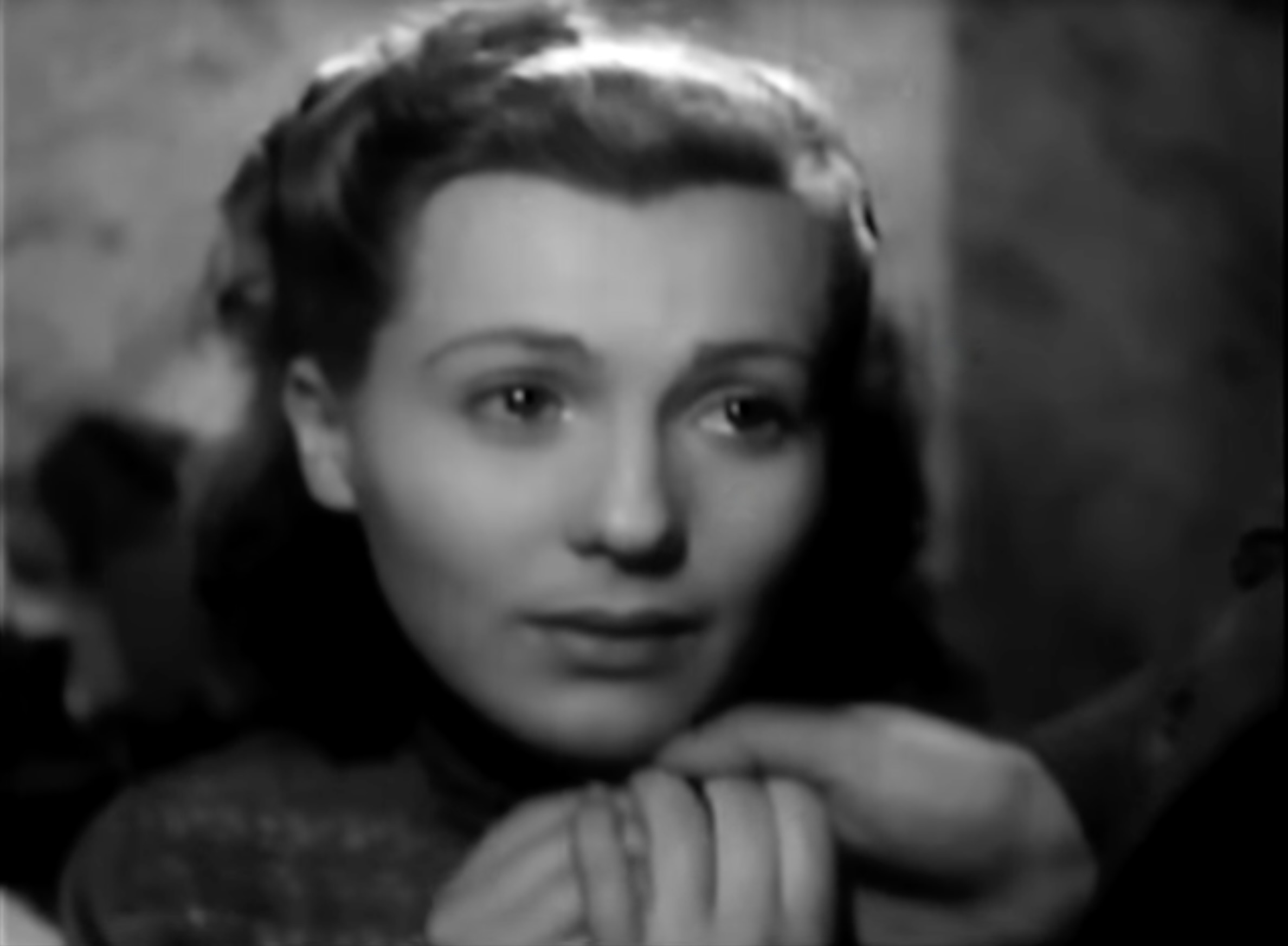
- Directed by: Natale Montillo
- Written by: Natale Montillo; Armando Fizzarotti
- Starring: Roberto Risso
- Cinematography: Romolo Garroni
- Edited by: Otello Colangeli
- Release date: 11 September 1952
- Country: Italy
- Language: Italian

Rosalba, la fanciulla di Pompei (Rosalba, the girl of Pompei) is a 1952 Italian musical melodrama film.

== Cast ==
- Roberto Risso: Giorgio de Montera
- Silvana Muzi: Rosalba Ambrosano
- Natale Montillo: Andrea Ambrosano
- Elli Parvo: Laura
- Renato Baldini: Vittorio Stelio
- Ugo D'Alessio: Nicolino
- Beniamino Maggio: Beniamino
- Maria Piazzai: Maria Rosa
- Renato Vicario: Tonino
- Leda Gloria: Vicina di casa
