= Fizzarotti =

Fizzarotti is an Italian surname. Notable people with the surname include:

- Armando Fizzarotti (1892–1966), Italian screenwriter and film director
- Ettore Maria Fizzarotti (1916–1985), Italian screenwriter and film director
