= Marcantonio Bragadin (admiral) =

Bragadin during World War II

Marcantonio Bragadin (6 October 1906, Rome – 11 June 1986, Rome) was an Italian admiral of the Royal Italian Navy and the Italian Navy. He was also an essayist and the screenwriter of a number of war films. He was a direct descendant of the 16th-century Venetian commander Marco Antonio Bragadin.

== Life ==
During World War II, Bragadin served as staff officer at Supermarina, the command of the Royal Italian Navy. After the war he became a naval historian; besides dealing with specialist topics, in 1949 he wrote the educational work Che ha fatto la Marina? 1940–45 (What did the Navy do? 1940–45) to make the navy's actions during World War II better known – they were then little known due to censorship. He had planned it in 1942 whilst serving in the Supermarina.

He was also the advisor, screenwriter, production manager, consultant and assistant director on four 1950s Italian war films – three directed by Duilio Coletti (I sette dell'Orsa maggiore, Divisione Folgore and La grande speranza) and one by Antonio Leonviola (Siluri umani, 1954)

== Works ==
- La marina italiana nella seconda guerra mondiale (1940–43), 1950, Lega Navale S.d.
- La marina italiana 1940–1945 - Segreti bellici e scelte operative, Bologna, Odoya, 2011, ISBN 9788862881104 pagg. 435
- Storia delle repubbliche marinare, Odoya, Bologna, pagg. 320, ISBN 9788862880824
  - Che ha fatto la Marina? 1940–45, Milano, Garzanti, 1949, prima edizione, pp. 611, con illustrazioni, foto in b/n, cartine e schede
- Il dramma della marina italiana 1940–1945. Milano: Oscar Mondadori, 1982
- SIM, SIS e SIA – Operazione Rigoletto – Da Roma a Mosca. - “Storia Illustrata”, numero speciale – Lo spionaggio nella Seconda Guerra Mondiale – vol. XXIII, n. 144, Novembre 1969, pp. 28–38;
