= Papaccio =

Papaccio is an Italian family surname.

The Papaccio surname occurs mostly in Southern Italy, in the Campania region.

The root "Papa" is probably Greek in origin and means "priest" but also a term of respect. Otherwise this surname derives from "papaccella" a vegetable similar to the green peperoni.

== People ==
- Salvatore Papaccio (1890–1977), Italian singer
