= La sposa =

- Directed by: Edmondo Lozzi
- Starring: Irène Tunc
- Cinematography: Romolo Garroni
- Music by: Franco Langella
- Release date: 1958
- Country: Italy
- Language: Italian

La sposa (Italian for The bride) is a 1958 Italian melodrama film directed by Edmondo Lozzi.

== Cast ==
- Irène Tunc: Flora
- Carlo Giuffrè: Maurizio
- Patrizia Remiddi: Ornella
- Aldo Bufi Landi: Mario
- Anna Maria Mazzarini: Mariella
- Beniamino Maggio: Beniamino
- Leda Gloria: Aunt Susanna
- Mario De Vico: Caifa
- Angela Luce: Margherita
- Ugo D'Alessio: il parroco
