= Folgore Division =

1955 film

- Directed by: Duilio Coletti
- Cinematography: Luciano Trasatti
- Music by: Nino Rota
- Release date: 1955
- Country: Italy
- Language: Italian

Folgore Division (Italian: Divisione Folgore) is a 1955 Italian war film directed by Duilio Coletti. It is based on actual events and depicts the 185th Infantry Division "Folgore" during the Second Battle of El Alamein in 1942. The screenwriter and military advisor was Marcantonio Bragadin.

== Plot ==
In the summer of 1942, during the Second World War, a group of young paratroopers from the 185th Infantry Division "Folgore", after having undergone long and tiring training in Italy, are transported by air to the Libyan desert to cover the Italian-German front. The young soldiers believe that their destination is the island of Malta (operation C3) or the vicinity of Alexandria: instead they find themselves thrown into a desert region where they are forced to live in fox-holes dug in the sand, and to face with insufficient means the British armoured units. They will sadly leave their parachutes piled up inside a warehouse in the desert. Thus develops that epic fight, which takes the name of the Second Battle of El Alamein, in which a handful of heroic fighters try with every effort to stop or at least delay the advance of Lieutenant-General Bernard Montgomery’s British tanks. Once the Italian defensive line has been penetrated, the survivors resist for several days an unequal struggle against the preponderant English forces, even being mentioned, for their heroism, by the British Prime Minister Winston Churchill, who called them "The lions of the Thunderbolt".

== Cast ==
- Ettore Manni: The Captain
- Fausto Tozzi: The Sergeant
- José Jaspe: Salvi
- Marco Guglielmi: Lt. Corsini
- Aldo Bufi Landi: Friar Gabriele
- Monica Clay: Captain's Wife
- Lea Padovani: Salvi's Wife
- Mario Girotti: Paratrooper
- Fabrizio Mioni: Gianluigi Corsini
- Fernando Cicero
- Carlo Tamberlani
