= Naples in Green and Blue =

- Directed by: Armando Fizzarotti
- Written by: Armando Fizzarotti
- Produced by: Raffaele Colamonici; Gioacchino De Martino
- Starring: Lina Gennari; Ellen Meis; Silvio Orsini; Armando Gill
- Cinematography: Antonio Cufaro; Armando Fizzarotti
- Edited by: Gennaro Masullo; Armando Fizzarotti
- Music by: E.A. Mario
- Production company: Coldim
- Release date: 1935
- Running time: 54 minutes
- Country: Italy
- Language: Italian

Naples in Green and Blue (Italian: Napoli verde-blu) is a 1935 Italian musical film directed by Armando Fizzarotti and starring Lina Gennari, Ellen Meis and Silvio Orsini. Although set in Naples, the film was shot in a studio in Rome. It was a low-budget revue, featuring a series of popular performers.

== Cast ==
- Lina Gennari
- Ellen Meis
- Silvio Orsini
- Armando Gill
- Agostino Salvietti
- Carlo Buti
- Nicola Maldacea
- Salvatore Papaccio
- Giuseppe Ricagno
- La Gemmati
- Anna Maria
- Girolamo Gaudiosi

== Bibliography ==
- Liehm, Mira. Passion and Defiance: Film in Italy from 1942 to the Present. University of California Press, 1984.
- Marlow-Mann, Alex. The New Neapolitan Cinema. Edinburgh University Press, 2011.
