= Pagella =

Pagella may refer to:

- Pagella, genus of tussock moths in the family Erebidae
- Sol Pagella (born 2002), Argentine field hockey player
- Crassula, defunct plant genus Pagella Schönland
- La pagella, 1980 Italian sceneggiata film directed by Ninì Grassia
