= Marcella Rovena =

Italian film and voice actress

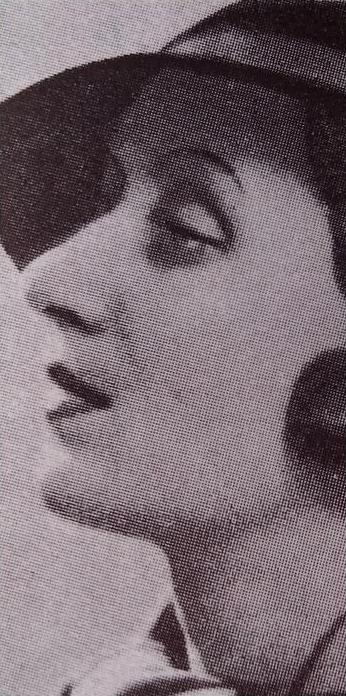
- Rovena in a photo from the 1930s
- Born: 22 January 1905; Conegliano, Italy
- Died: 6 October 1991 (aged 86); Rome, Italy

Marcella Rovena (22 January 1905 – 6 October 1991) was an Italian film and voice actress. Born in Conegliano, she started her career on the big screen in 1932 with director Nunzio Malasomma in the film La telefonista.

== Biography ==
After fleeing following the Battle of Caporetto, Marcella Rovena reached Rome in 1917. She began her career in local theater companies before joining the company of Alfredo De Sanctis in 1928, followed by that of Armando Migliari. She later served as the "prima attrice giovane" (lead young actress) alongside Dina Galli and Antonio Gandusio. She was eventually discovered by director Mario Mattoli, who cast her in his Za-Bum variety shows.

She was married to the film critic Ermanno Contini.

=== Film ===
Rovena made her big-screen debut in the early 1930s under director Nunzio Malasomma in the film La telefonista (1932), appearing alongside Isa Pola, Luigi Cimara, and Sergio Tofano. This marked the beginning of a prolific career as a character actor, appearing in over 60 films through the end of the 1960s. During her career, she collaborated with several of Italy’s most prominent directors, including Luchino Visconti, Vittorio De Sica, Roberto Rossellini, and Pietro Germi.

=== Dubbing ===
Known for her distinctive and commanding vocal timbre, Rovena became one of Italy's first professional voice actors. In 1932, shortly after the inception of dubbing in Italy, she was selected to provide the Italian voices for major American stars, including Eve Arden, Claudette Colbert, Claire Trevor, and Barbara Stanwyck. Her work was highly regarded; notably, actress Kay Francis reportedly complimented Rovena's performance after viewing the Italian version of the film Cynara (Italian title: Infedele). Rovena also provided the voice for a young Anna Magnani in the film Princess Tarakanova. Dubbing remained a central pillar of her professional life alongside her film roles.

== Filmography ==
Year	Title	Role	Notes
1932	The Telephone Operator	Bàttigo's wife	
1933	Non c'è bisogno di denaro	Anna	
1935	I'll Give a Million	La donna del tiro a segno	Uncredited
1935	Passaporto rosso		
1942	La guardia del corpo	Un'amica di Adriana	
1944	Il fiore sotto gli occhi	Maria Luisa	
1945	Come Back to Sorrento	La madre di Paola	
1948	Be Seeing You, Father	Zia Gertrude	
1949	Totò Le Mokò	Sara, the fortune-teller	Uncredited
1950	Toto Looks for a Wife	Anna	
1950	Bluebeard's Six Wives	Silvana	
1950	The Knight Has Arrived!	Signora Varelli	
1951	Cameriera bella presenza offresi...	La contessa	
1951	Stasera sciopero		
1951	Licenza premio	Zingara	
1952	Abracadabra	Cesira Caiazzo	
1952	Europa '51	Mrs. Puglisi	
1952	Three Forbidden Stories	Madre di Gianna	(Third segment)
1952	Poppy	Governanta casa Zacchi	
1952	La colpa di una madre	Agata	
1952	Red Love	Fidela	
1953	One of Those		Uncredited
1953	The Ship of Condemned Women	Nora	
1954	The Beach	Roberto's Wife	
1954	High School	Madre di Camilla	
1954	Guai ai vinti	Contessa Amelia	
1955	The Sign of Venus	Elvira	
1955	Friends for Life	Professoressa di inglese	
1955	Bravissimo	Egle's mother	
1955	Desperate Farewell	Concetta Basile	
1956	Wives and Obscurities	Signora Baglioni	
1957	White Nights	La padrona della pensione	
1958	A Man of Straw		Uncredited
1958	Young Husbands	Madre di Franco	
1958	Pia de' Tolomei		
1958	Caporale di giornata	Marquise De Gregorio	
1959	...And the Wild Wild Women	Signora Luisa	
1960	The Passionate Thief		
1960	Anonima cocottes		
1961	Five Day Lover	Madame Chanut	
1961	Totòtruffa 62	Insegnante storia dell' arte	
1961	Day by Day, Desperately		
1962	Careless		
1962	A Man for Burning	Madre di Francesca	
1962	La banda Casaroli	Madre di Gabriele	
1962	I motorizzati	Maria Grazia	
1963	The Leopard		
1963	The Empty Canvas	Tenant	
1964	The Warm Life		
1964	The Visit	Mayor's Wife	Uncredited
1964	La suora giovane		
1965	The Young Nun		
1965	Made in Italy	The Maid	(segment "5 'La Famiglia', episode 2")
1966	After the Fox	Salvatore's Wife	Uncredited
