= Tragic Ballad =

1954 film by Luigi Capuano

- Directed by: Luigi Capuano
- Written by: Luigi Capuano; Ezio D'Errico
- Produced by: Domenico Forges Davanzati
- Starring: Teddy Reno; Beniamino Maggio; Nando Bruno; Marisa Allasio; Tina Pica; Barbara Shelley; Leda Gloria; Marc Lawrence
- Cinematography: Mario Albertelli
- Edited by: Jolanda Benvenuti
- Music by: Mario Nascimbene
- Production company: Industrie Cinematografiche Sociali
- Distributed by: Diana Cinematografica
- Release date: 1954
- Running time: 85 minutes
- Country: Italy
- Language: Italian

Tragic Ballad (Italian: Ballata tragica) is a 1954 Italian crime musical melodrama film directed by Luigi Capuano and starring Teddy Reno, Beniamino Maggio and Nando Bruno.

The film's sets were designed by the art director Alfredo Montori.

== Cast ==
- Teddy Reno as Stefano Accardi
- Beniamino Maggio as Giovanni Barone
- Nando Bruno as Commisario
- Marisa Allasio as Maria Rota
- Tina Pica as Moglie del nostromo
- Barbara Shelley as Betty Mason
- Leda Gloria as Signora Barone
- Marc Lawrence as Felipe Alvaro
- Enzo Petito as Nostromo
- Amedeo Girardi as Paolo Accardi
- Giulio Calì as Marinaio genovese
- Rosalia Maggio as cameriera casa Accardi
- Giacomo Furia as Vigile urbano
- Michele Malaspina as armatore amico Accardi
- Cesare Fantoni as Ispettore polizia
- Pasquale De Filippo as Aiutante commissario
- Natale Cirino as Cesare Rota
- Mario Passante as Joe
- Vincent Barbi as complice di Felipe

== Bibliography ==
- Chiti, Roberto & Poppi, Roberto. Dizionario del cinema italiano: Dal 1945 al 1959. Gremese Editore, 1991.
