= The City Stands Trial =

1952 film

- Film poster
- Directed by: Luigi Zampa
- Written by: Suso Cecchi d'Amico; Diego Fabbri; Ettore Giannini; Francesco Rosi; Turi Vasile
- Produced by: Paolo Moffa
- Starring: Amedeo Nazzari; Silvana Pampanini; Paolo Stoppa
- Cinematography: Enzo Serafin
- Edited by: Eraldo Da Roma
- Music by: Enzo Masetti
- Production company: Film Costellazione
- Distributed by: Film Costellazione
- Release date: 5 September 1952
- Running time: 98 minutes
- Country: Italy
- Language: Italian

The City Stands Trial (Italian: Processo alla città) is a 1952 Italian crime drama film directed by Luigi Zampa and starring Amedeo Nazzari, Silvana Pampanini and Paolo Stoppa. It is based on a revisiting of the Cuocolo murders and the struggle for control of Naples by the Camorra in the early 1900s. It is considered to be Zampa's most accomplished film. It was shot at the Cinecittà Studios in Rome and on location in Naples. It was entered into the 3rd Berlin International Film Festival.

== Synopsis ==
In Naples at the beginning of the twentieth century a double murder of husband and wife appears to be the work of the Camorra. A crusading young judge takes on the case but faces a number of threats and obstacles, and his investigation turns much of the population against him.

== Cast ==
- Amedeo Nazzari as Judge Spicacci
- Silvana Pampanini as Liliana Ferrari
- Paolo Stoppa as Perrone
- Dante Maggio as Armando Capezzuto
- Franco Interlenghi as Luigi Esposito
- Irène Galter as Nunziata
- Gualtiero Tumiati as Consigliere Capo
- Rino Genovese as Mimì
- Eduardo Ciannelli as Alfonso Navona
- Tina Pica as Restaurant's cook
- Turi Pandolfini as Don Filippetti
- Mariella Lotti as Elena
- Franca Tamantini as Carmela
- Bella Starace Sainati as The Porter at Ruotolo's
- Agostino Salvietti as Brigadiere Mastellone
- Mimì Ferrari as Don Salvatore
- Viviane Vallé as Maria
- Vittorio André as Amedeo Contursi
- Tina Castigliano as Amalia Tortorella
- Vittoria Crispo as Neighbour of Ruotolos
- Lino Crispo as Gennarino 'nzisto
- Vittoria Donato as Adelina Leonardi
- Mario Laurentino as The Jeweller De Nicola
- Arturo Maghizzano as Mezarecchia
- Pasquale Martino as Brigadiere Luigi Cifariello
- Mario Passante as The Man Whom Filippetti Hands Ledgers
- Nino Veglia as Maria's Pimp
- Nino Vingelli as Pasqualino 'o 17
- Carlo Pisacane as Don Rosario
- Ada Colangeli as The Maid at Tortorella's
- Ugo D'Alessio as Gennaro Ruotolo

== Bibliography ==
- Moliterno, Gino (2008). The A to Z of Italian Cinema, Plymouth: Scarecrow Press ISBN 978-0-8108-6896-0
