= Natale Cirino =

Italian stage and film actor

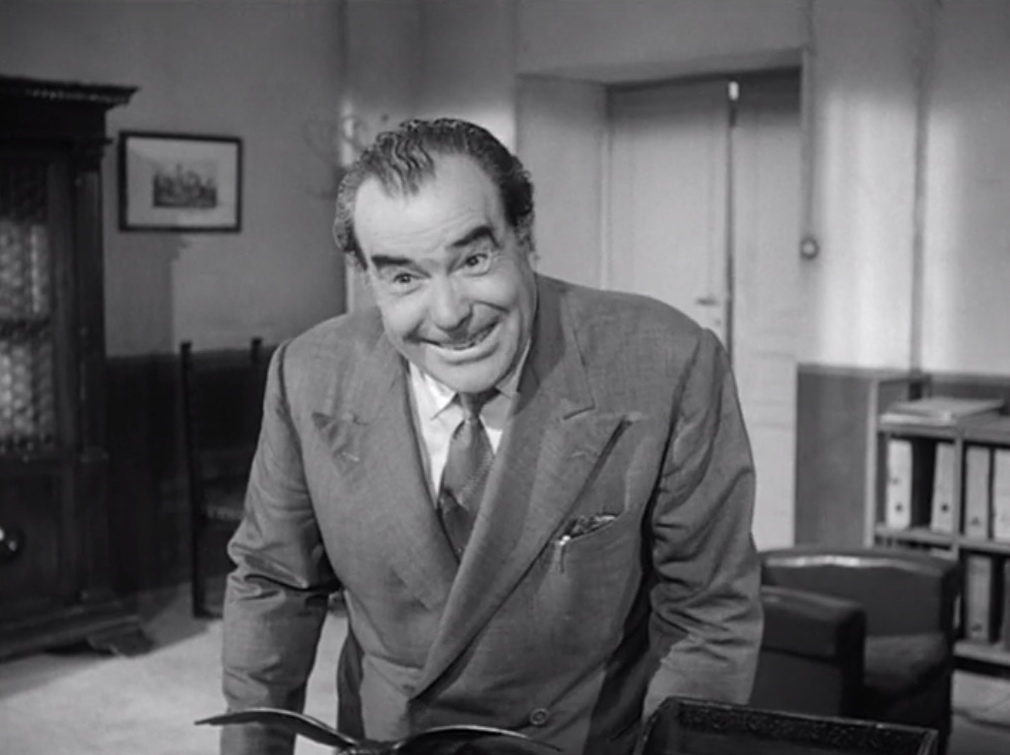
- Natale Cirino as Marshal Cannavò in It Happened at the Police Station (1954)
- Born: 5 February 1894; Catania, Italy
- Died: 29 May 1962 (aged 68); Palermo, Italy
- Occupation: Actor

Natale Cirino (5 February 1894 – 29 May 1962) was an Italian stage and film actor.

== Life and career ==
Born in Catania, Cirino started his career entering the most important theatrical companies active in Sicily (including the ones held by Turi Pandolfini, Michele Abruzzo, Rosina Anselmi, and Giovanni Grasso) before forming his own stage company in 1928. In 1943 he made his film debut in the Pino Mercanti's historical drama All'ombra della gloria, and from then he started an intense career as a character actor, with some sporadic main roles. He was married to stage actress Rita Alaimo (1894-1964).

== Selected filmography ==
- For the Love of Mariastella (1946)
- Appointment for Murder (1951)
- The Crossroads (1951)
- Carcerato (1951)
- Lorenzaccio (1951)
- Buon viaggio pover'uomo (1951)
- Ergastolo (1952)
- Saluti e baci (1953)
- It Happened at the Police Station (1954)
- Letter from Naples (1954)
- Tragic Ballad (1954)
- Maddalena (1954)
- Buonanotte... avvocato! (1955)
- Andalusia Express (1956)
- The Knight of the Black Sword (1956)
- Arrivano i dollari! (1957)
