= Two Cents Worth of Hope =

1952 film by Renato Castellani

Two Cents Worth of Hope (Due Soldi di Speranza)
- Italian: Due soldi di speranza
- Directed by: Renato Castellani
- Written by: Renato Castellani; Titina De Filippo
- Produced by: Sandro Ghenzi
- Starring: Maria Fiore; Vincenzo Musolino
- Cinematography: Arturo Gallea
- Music by: Alessandro Cicognini; Nino Rota
- Distributed by: Les Films Marceau (France); Times Film Corporation (United States)
- Release date: 1952
- Running time: 110 min.
- Country: Italy
- Languages: Neapolitan; Italian

Two Cents Worth of Hope (Italian: Due soldi di speranza) is a 1952 film directed by Renato Castellani. It is the third part of Castellani's Young Love trilogy, following Sotto il sole di Roma (1948) and È primavera...(1950).

It shared the Grand Prix prize with Othello at the 1952 Cannes Film Festival. In 2008, the film was included on the Italian Ministry of Cultural Heritage’s 100 Italian films to be saved, a list of 100 films that "have changed the collective memory of the country between 1942 and 1978."

== Plot ==
A twenty-year-old man named Antonio Catalano returns to his fictional hometown of Cusano in Irpinia after completing military service. Unemployed, he must support his widowed mother, deal with her gambling addiction, and care for his five sisters of various ages. Despite romantic attention from Carmela, a strong and beautiful girl, financial difficulties prevent them from planning marriage, especially since Carmela's father refuses to help.

Antonio takes on odd jobs to save money, as his sister Giuliana faces a dilemma due to a landowner who won't marry her without a dowry. Antonio initially works as a carriage assistant, then collaborates with drivers to form a cooperative for a bus service, but the plan fails due to the drivers' incompetence and greed.

Hired as a sacristan by the parish priest, Antonio secretly collaborates with a communist group in Naples at night. Carmela reveals his double life in a quarrel, leading to his dismissal by the priest. Antonio eventually finds employment in Naples with Flora Angelini, a refined woman who owns cinemas. He transports film reels and sells his blood to her sick son in need of constant transfusions.

While Mrs. Angelini is drawn to Antonio's rugged charm, he remains loyal to Carmela. However, Carmela's jealousy causes a scene, resulting in Antonio losing his job once again. Carmela plans a romantic escape to force her family to accept their relationship, but she lacks the courage to go through with it. In the end, the couple returns to their hometown, announcing their intention to marry despite the challenges. Local market vendors support them by providing unlimited credit for clothing.

== Cast ==
- Maria Fiore - Carmela
- Vincenzo Musolino - Antonio
- Filomena Russo - Antonio's Mother
- Luigi Astarita - Pasquale Artu
- Luigi Barone - The priest
- Carmela Cirillo - Giulia
- Felicità Lettieri - Signora Artu
- Gina Mascetti - Flora Angelini
- Alfonso Del Sorbo - Sacrestano
- Tommaso Balzamo - Luigi Bellomo
- Anna Raiola - Signora Bellomo
- Gioacchino Morrone
- Luigi Cutino
- Pasqualina Izza
- Antonio Balzamo
