= Letter from Naples =

- Film poster
- Directed by: Giorgio Pastina
- Written by: Luigi Capuano; Luigi Cioffi
- Produced by: Fortunato Misiano
- Starring: Giacomo Rondinella; Virna Lisi; Otello Toso
- Cinematography: Giuseppe La Torre
- Edited by: Jolanda Benvenuti
- Music by: Giuseppe Cioffi
- Production company: Romana Film
- Distributed by: Siden Film
- Release date: 12 July 1954
- Running time: 92 minutes
- Country: Italy
- Language: Italian

Letter from Naples (Italian: Lettera napoletana) is a 1954 Italian musical melodrama film directed by Giorgio Pastina and starring Giacomo Rondinella, Virna Lisi and Otello Toso.

The film's sets were designed by the art director Alfredo Montori. It was shot on location in Naples.

== Plot ==
In Naples, Don Gaetano's company has Alvaro Ramirez as a partner, who is secretly in love with his secretary Laura. Among the various employees is Franco, in love, also secretly, with the boss's daughter, Anna. Only Carluccio, a nice worker, knows of the affair between Franco and Don Gaetano's daughter. At a party the two boys kiss, but Alvaro suspects something and tells his lover that the marriage between the two does not want it at all, because this would mean that Franco, a former delivery boy, would become the master.

To make money, he convinces his lover to take some money to give for a shady turnover, but the motorcycle with the money is captured off the coast of Salerno. The secretary is desperate, but Alvaro has another idea and puts a bomb on the safe, after taking more money and checks, simulating a robbery. Her daughter, Anna, pretends to be ill, sending Concetta to a party. So she goes out with Franco, but Alvaro sees them together. Carluccio notices the theft from the safe and the police are called.

Among the suspects there is also Franco, who defends himself by saying that at the time of the outbreak he was at the cinema, but no one saw him. He actually was with Anna, but he can't tell. Alvaro tries to frame him, sending him with Carluccio to pick up a load carrying coffee, but in truth he also has contraband cigarettes inside. Finance discovers them and arrests them. Meanwhile, Laura goes to the home of Franco's mother, who, being blind, does not see her putting the stolen money between the pages of one of her books. Don Gaetano returns and his daughter, in tears, tells him everything; but her father doesn't take it well and threatens to kill Franco. Gaetano still wants to get them out of prison, but the police keep them inside because the money and checks placed by Laura at Franco's house are found. Anna goes to Franco's mother and tells her everything; she then she goes to Franco and she tells him she is pregnant. Alvaro has another idea and decides to go and have a talk with Anna and, to save her honor from her father, he proposes to marry him.

At a celebration where the inmates are also present, Franco sings the song "Lettera Napoletana" on the radio, moving his mother and Anna who listen to him from their homes. Anna has to get married but she convinces her father that she can't do it and he agrees. Laura, in a moment of weakness and sincerity, tells Gaetano everything, who awaits Alvaro's return. After a fight, in which the youngest and strongest Alvaro wins, Gaetano gets up and hits him from the back with a hammer on the head.

He decides to call the police, but Alvaro recovers and shoots him wounding him; then he runs away. But Gaetano manages to reveal to the police that the criminal will surely go away with the ship that is about to leave for the port. So the police search the ship, but when they find Alvaro, the latter reacts and is killed. Now Franco and Anna can kiss peacefully on the beach.

== Cast ==
- Giacomo Rondinella as Franco De Rosa
- Virna Lisi as Anna Esposito
- Otello Toso as Álvaro Ramírez
- Beniamino Maggio as Carluccio
- Rosalia Maggio as Concetta
- Lia Orlandini as Franco De Rosa's Mother
- Natale Cirino as Commendator Gaetano Esposito
- Ignazio Balsamo as The Police Commissioner
- Giulio Battiferri as Juan
- Pasquale De Filippo as Caporale
- Luigi Pisano as The Prison Warden
- Almarella as The Nightclub Singer
- Lianella Carell as Laura Conforto
- Pasquale Martino as Prison Officer
- Mario Passante as The Restaurant Waiter

== Bibliography ==
- Chiti, Roberto & Poppi, Roberto. Dizionario del cinema italiano: Dal 1945 al 1959. Gremese Editore, 1991.
