= Massimo Mida =

Italian screenwriter and film director

- Born: 5 May 1917; Falconara Marittima, Marche, Italy
- Died: 21 April 1992 (aged 74); Rome, Italy
- Occupations: Writer, Director
- Years active: 1942-1984

Massimo Mida (1917–1992) was an Italian screenwriter and film director.

== Selected filmography ==
- A Pilot Returns (1942)
- Behind Closed Shutters (1951)
- At the Edge of the City (1953)
- Good Folk's Sunday (1953)
- Chronicle of Poor Lovers (1954)
- The Prince with the Red Mask (1955)

== Bibliography ==
- Torunn Haaland. Italian Neorealist Cinema. Edinburgh University Press, 2012.
