= Malaspina (film) =

- Film poster
- Directed by: Armando Fizzarotti
- Written by: Roberto Amoroso
- Produced by: Roberto Amoroso
- Starring: Vera Rol; Aldo Bufi Landi; Rino Genovese; Ugo D'Alessio
- Cinematography: Roberto Amoroso
- Music by: Giuseppe Cioffi
- Production company: Sud Film
- Distributed by: Variety Distribution
- Release date: 1 May 1947
- Running time: 90 minutes
- Country: Italy
- Language: Italian

Malaspina is a 1947 Italian melodrama film directed by Armando Fizzarotti and starring Vera Rol, Aldo Bufi Landi and Rino Genovese. It is a melodrama, based on a popular song of the same name. Its story of female wrongdoing and ultimate redemption was characteristic of Neapolitan-style cinema.

== Synopsis ==
A young woman promises to be faithful to her lover when he goes off to fight in the Second World War. However, in his absence she becomes a prostitute and takes up with a notorious criminal. When her real love returns he kills her new boyfriend. Deeply ashamed of her conduct, she becomes a nun.

== Reception ==
The film revived the Naples film-industry, which had largely disappeared during the Fascist era when Italian filmmaking was concentrated in Rome. The film was released in the United States, where it proved popular with Italian-American audiences.

== Cast ==
- Vera Rol as Maria, detta 'Malaspina'
- Aldo Bufi Landi as Andrea
- Rino Genovese as Gaetano
- Ugo D'Alessio as Nicola
- Vittoria Crispo as Teresina
- Carmelo Capurro
- Nicola Pouthod
- Alberto Amato
- Gino Vittorio

== Bibliography ==
- Marlow-Mann, Alex. The New Neapolitan Cinema. Edinburgh University Press, 2011.
- Moine, Raphaëlle. Cinema Genre. John Wiley & Sons, 2009.
