= Madunnella =

1948 film

- Directed by: Ernesto Grassi
- Written by: Roberto Amoroso; Ernesto Grassi
- Produced by: Roberto Amoroso
- Starring: Edmea Lari; Aldo Bufi Landi; Rino Genovese
- Cinematography: Roberto Amoroso
- Edited by: Roberto Amoroso
- Music by: Giuseppe Anepeta
- Production company: Sud Film Produzione Cinematografica
- Release date: 1 March 1948
- Running time: 90 minutes
- Country: Italy
- Language: Italian

Madunnella is a 1948 Italian melodrama film directed by Ernesto Grassi and starring Edmea Lari, Aldo Bufi Landi and Rino Genovese.

== Plot ==
A respectable clerk from Naples becomes mixed up in embezzlement and smuggling in order to pay for his daughter's wedding.

== Cast ==
- Edmea Lari as Maria, detta 'a Madunnella'
- Aldo Bufi Landi as Mario
- Rino Genovese as Michele il contrabbandiere
- Ugo D'Alessio as Il ragionere, padre di Maria
- Vittoria Crispo
- Giovanni Berardi
- Alberto Amato
- Natale Montillo

== Bibliography ==
- Caldiron, Orio. La bella compagnia. Bulzoni, 2009.
