= Nino Eller =

Italian stage and film actor

- Occupation: Actor
- Years active: 1931–1942 (film)

Nino Eller was an Italian stage and film actor.

== Selected filmography ==
- Television (1931)
- The Phantom Gondola (1936)
- The Former Mattia Pascal (1937)
- Backstage (1939)
- Sealed Lips (1942)

== Bibliography ==
- Waldman, Harry. Missing Reels: Lost Films of American and European Cinema. McFarland, 2000.
