= Il padrone sono me =

- Directed by: Franco Brusati
- Cinematography: Philippe Agostini
- Music by: Roman Vlad
- Release date: 1955
- Country: Italy
- Language: Italian

Il padrone sono me is a 1955 Italian comedy-drama film. It marked the directorial debut of Franco Brusati. The film premiered at the 16th Venice International Film Festival.

== Cast ==
- Paolo Stoppa: Mingon
- Andreina Pagnani: Miss Maria
- Myriam Bru: Dolly
- Pierre Bertin: Robertino
- Leopoldo Trieste: Professor Edoardo
- Jacques Chabassol
- Daniela Rocca
- Giuseppe Addobbati
- Guido Celano
- Lina Gennari
