= Rino Genovese =

Italian film actor (1905–1967)

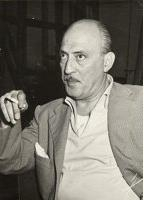
- Born: 19 September 1905; Naples, Campania, Italy
- Died: 5 June 1967 (aged 61); Naples, Campania, Italy
- Occupation: Actor
- Years active: 1938–1966 (film)

Rino Genovese (1905–1967) was an Italian film actor.

== Selected filmography ==
- Naples of Former Days (1938)
- Malaspina (1947)
- Madunnella (1948)
- The City Stands Trial (1952)
- Perdonami! (1953)
- Altair (1956)

== Bibliography ==
- Piero Pruzzo & Enrico Lancia. Amedeo Nazzari. Gremese Editore, 1983.
