= Television (1931 film) =

1931 film directed by Charles de Rochefort

- Directed by: Charles de Rochefort
- Written by: Michel Duran; Dino Falconi; Howard Irving Young (play)
- Starring: Anna Maria Dossena; Silvio Orsini; Amina Pirani Maggi
- Cinematography: Fernando Risi
- Edited by: Otello Colangeli
- Production company: Paramount Pictures
- Distributed by: Paramount Pictures
- Release date: September 1931
- Country: United States
- Language: Italian

Television (Italian: Televisione) is a 1931 American comedy film directed by Charles de Rochefort and starring Anna Maria Dossena, Silvio Orsini and Amina Pirani Maggi.

Adapted from the play by Howard Irving Young, it was made at the Joinville Studios in Paris. Paramount Pictures was pursuing a strategy of producing multiple-language versions there, and this film was made in several different languages. The film's sets were designed by Paolo Reni.

== Cast ==
- Anna Maria Dossena as Jeanne
- Silvio Orsini as Andrea Leroy, L'inventore
- Amina Pirani Maggi as La signora Ridon, la portinaia
- Cesare Zoppetti as Stefani, il finanziere
- Nino Eller as Sinclair
- Enrico Signorini as Jean

== Bibliography ==
- Waldman, Harry. Missing Reels: Lost Films of American and European Cinema. McFarland, 2000.
