= Milly Vitale =

Italian actress (1933–2006)

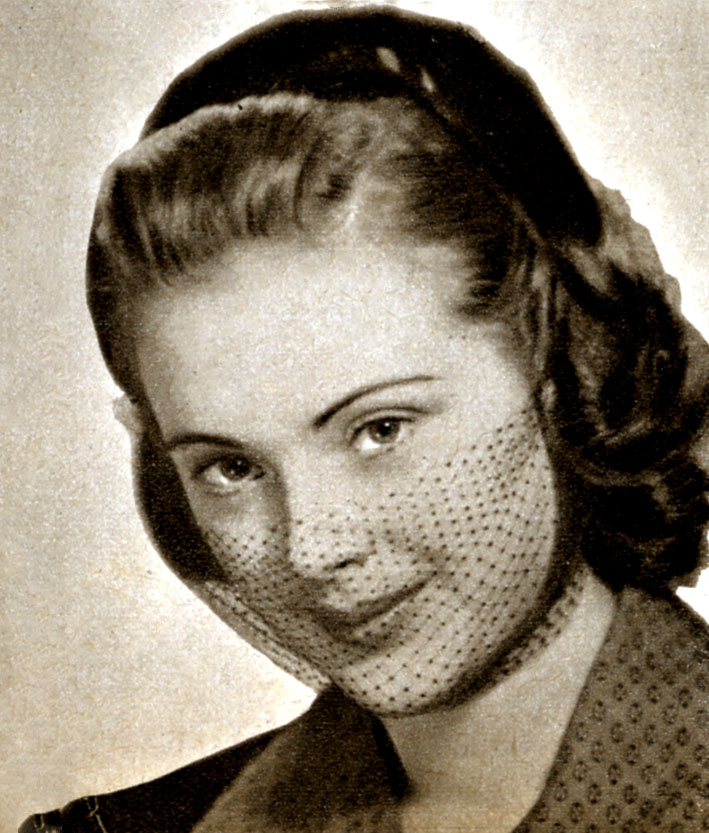
- Born: Camilla Vitale; 16 July 1933; Rome, Kingdom of Italy
- Died: 2 November 2006 (aged 73); Rome, Italy
- Occupation: Actress
- Years active: 1947–1972
- Spouse: Vincent Hillyer (1960–1966)
- Children: Edward Hillyer (b. 1961); Vincent Hillyer Jr. (b. 1964)
- Parent(s): Riccardo Vitale; Natasha Shidlowski

Camilla "Milly" Vitale (16 July 1933 – 2 November 2006) was an Italian actress. She was the daughter of Italian Riccardo Vitale (Rome Opera House Director, deceased 1979) and Russian choreographer Natasha Shidlowski Vitale (deceased 1994).

She appeared in numerous post-war Italian films, 47 films. She appeared in a few Hollywood movies but never achieved star status like her contemporaries Sophia Loren and Gina Lollobrigida. In her most notable U.S. role, she appeared with Bob Hope as "Madeleine Morundo Foy" in The Seven Little Foys (1956). She was featured in The Juggler co-starring with Kirk Douglas (1953) and in the epic film War and Peace (1956).

== Personal life ==
She married Vincent Hillyer, a United States citizen, in 1960; the marriage produced two sons, E. and Vincent Jr. The couple divorced about 1970. Vitale retired from acting in the early 1970s, after a career of more than 47 films. She died in Rome in 2006.

== Selected filmography ==
- The Brothers Karamazov (1947) - Lisa
- Difficult Years (1948) - Maria
- Buried Alive (1949) - Eva
- La città dolente (1949) - Maria
- Black Magic (1949) - (uncredited)
- La figlia del peccato (1949) - Lucia
- The Lion of Amalfi (1950) - Eleonora
- The Fighting Men (1950) - Elena Occhipinti
- Hearts at Sea (1950) - Fioretta
- Il Caimano del Piave (1951) - Lucilla di Torrebruna
- Revenge of the Pirates (1951) - Luana
- Cameriera bella presenza offresi... (1951) - Nandina, l'amante di Leonardi
- Trieste mia! (1951) - Anna
- Lieutenant Giorgio (1952) - Contessa Elisa
- At Sword's Edge (1952) - Linda
- Son of the Hunchback (1952) - Olympe de Chaverny
- Prisoners of Darkness (1952) - Beatrice Rionero
- Prisoner in the Tower of Fire (1952) - Germana della Valle
- The Juggler (1953) - Ya'El
- Nero and the Burning of Rome (1953) - Atte
- For You I Have Sinned (1953) - Elena
- If You Won a Hundred Million (1953) - (segment "L'indossatrice")
- Noi cannibali (1953)
- La pattuglia dell'Amba Alagi (1953) - Maria
- Condannatelo! (1953) - Franca
- Rasputin (1954) - Laura
- Disonorata - Senza colpa (1954) - Lucia Fortino
- Mata Hari's Daughter (1954) - Angela
- Acque amare (1954) - Mara
- The Two Orphans (1954) - Louise
- Loves of Three Queens (1954) - Maria Luisa (segment "Napoleon and Josephine")
- I cavalieri dell'illusione (1954)
- Di qua, di là del Piave (1954)
- The Seven Little Foys (1955) - Madeleine Morando Foy
- Ripudiata (1955)
- The Song of the Heart (1955) - Lucia
- Torna piccina mia! (1955) - Laura / Stella
- Cantami buongiorno tristezza (1955) - Giovanna
- Vendicata! (1956)
- War and Peace (1956) - Lisa Bolkonskaya
- Un giglio infranto (1956) - Contessa Amelia Renzi
- Porta un bacione a Firenze (1956) - Simonetta
- Occhi senza luce (1956) - Daisy Ellis
- The Black Devil (1957) - Isabella
- The Flesh Is Weak (1957) - Marissa Cooper
- La canzone del destino (1957) - Elena
- Battle of the V-1 (1958) - Anna
- Ten Ready Rifles (1959) - Lucía
- Checkerboard (1959) - Prostitute
- Hannibal (1959) - Danila
- A Breath of Scandal (1960) - Can-Can girl
- Revak the Rebel (1960) - Princess Cherata
- Days of Fire (1968) - Anna
- Be Sick... It's Free (1968)
- Let's Have a Riot (1970)
- La grande avventura di Scaramouche (1972) - The Queen of France (final film role)
