= Maria Fiore =

Italian actress (1935–2004)

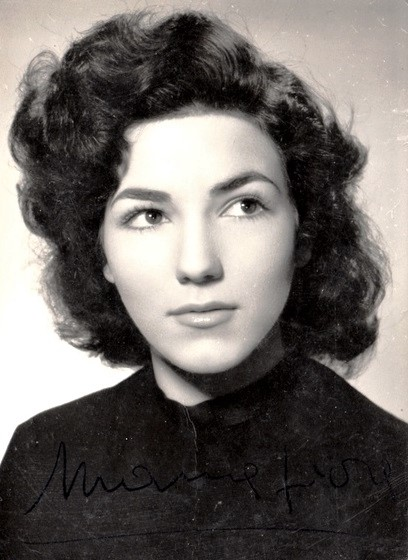
- Fiore in 1950
- Born: Jolanda Di Fiore; 1 October 1935; Rome, Kingdom of Italy
- Died: 28 October 2004 (aged 69); Rome, Italy
- Occupation: Actress
- Years active: 1952–1999

Maria Fiore (1 October 1935 – 28 October 2004) was an Italian film and television actress. She appeared in 50 films between 1952 and 1999.

== Life and career ==
Born Jolanda Di Fiori in Rome, despite a non-professional acting background, she made her film debut in a leading role, in the Renato Castellani's pink-neorealist film Two Cents Worth of Hope. Following the success of the film, she was one of the most requested actresses until the first half of the 1960s, even if often cast in stock roles of impulsive and genuine low-class girls. Starting from the 1970s, she focused on television, where she got several main roles in some series.

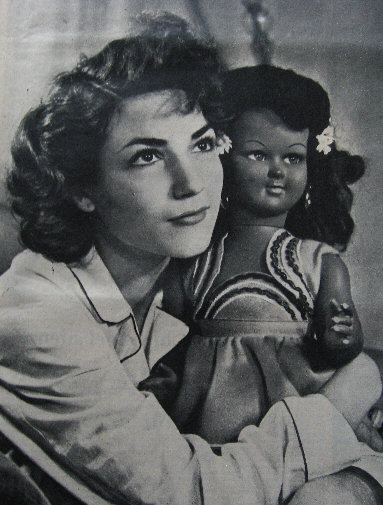
Maria Fiore on Italian magazine Avanguardia, 1956.

== Selected filmography ==
- Two Cents Worth of Hope (1952)
- Beauties on Motor Scooters (1952)
- Melody of Love (1952)
- Half a Century of Song (1952)
- Good Folk's Sunday (1953)
- Graziella (1954)
- Neapolitan Carousel (1954)
- Love Song (1954)
- A Slice of Life (1954)
- I pappagalli (1955)
- Sunset in Naples (1955)
- The Prince with the Red Mask (1955)
- Serenata a Maria (1957)
- Quanto sei bella Roma (1959)
- La garçonnière (1960)
- Thor and the Amazon Women (1963)
- Let's Talk About Women (1964)
- Il Gaucho (1964)
- The Big Family (1973)
- Prostituzione (1974)
- Syndicate Sadists (1975)
- Mamma Ebe (1985)
