= Gina Mascetti =

Italian actress

- Born: 24 April 1911; Rome, Lazio, Italy
- Died: 14 September 1995 (aged 84); Rome, Lazio Italy
- Occupation: Actress
- Years active: 1950–1976 (film)

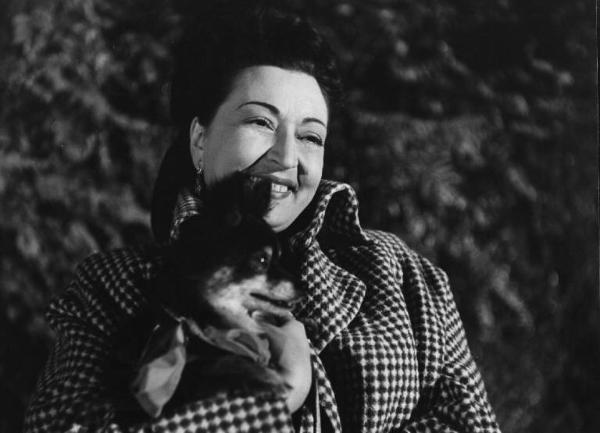
Gina Mascetti in “Luci del varietà”

Gina Mascetti (1911-1995) was an Italian film actress. A character actress, she appeared in a number of comedy films notably as Alberto Sordi's wife in The White Sheik (1952). The same year she also featured in the neorealist drama Two Cents Worth of Hope.

== Selected filmography ==
- Variety Lights (1950)
- Red Moon (1951)
- Cameriera bella presenza offresi... (1951)
- The White Sheik (1952)
- Two Cents Worth of Hope (1952)
- One Hundred Little Mothers (1952)
- Drama on the Tiber (1952)
- Five Paupers in an Automobile (1952)
- A Parisian in Rome (1954)
- It Happened at the Police Station (1954)
- The Song of the Heart (1955)
- Da qui all'eredità (1955)
- Oh! Sabella (1957)
- Three Strangers in Rome (1958)
- Cavalier in Devil's Castle (1959)
- The Thief of Baghdad (1961)
- The Witch's Curse (1962)
- What Ever Happened to Baby Toto? (1964)
- Pensiero d'amore (1969)
- Trastevere (1971)
- The Beasts (1971)
- Live Like a Cop, Die Like a Man (1976)

== Bibliography ==
- Cardullo, Bert. What is Neorealism?: A Critical English-language Bibliography of Italian Cinematic Neorealism. University Press of America, 1991.
- Carolan, Mary Ann McDonald. The Transatlantic Gaze: Italian Cinema, American Film. SUNY Press, 2014.
