= Beniamino Maggio =

Italian actor

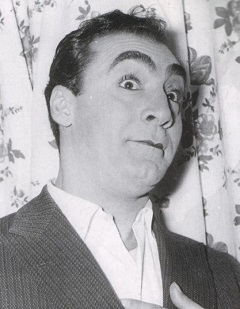
- Maggio in the 1950s
- Born: 10 August 1907; Naples, Italy
- Died: 6 September 1990 (aged 83); Naples, Italy
- Occupation: Actor

Beniamino Maggio (10 August 1907 – 6 September 1990) was an Italian actor.

Born in Naples into a family of actors, Maggio debuted on stage as a child, as the sidekick of the comedian Serafino Mastracchio, and he slowly built a reputation in the Neapolitan avanspettacolo between the 1930s and 1940s. He made his film debut in 1942 and had a very prolific career even if often cast in character roles. An actor characterized by improvisation skills, described as a "mix between Buster Keaton and Angelo Musco", Maggio often worked on stage with his brothers and sisters Dante, Enzo, Pupella and Rosalia.

Maggio died from complications of a stroke that had hit him while on stage alongside his two sisters Pupella and Rosalia.

== Selected filmography ==
- Captain Demonio (1950)
- Ha fatto tredici (1951)
- Red Moon (1951)
- The Two Sergeants (1951)
- Miracle in Viggiù (1951)
- Melody of Love (1952)
- Rosalba, la fanciulla di Pompei (1952)
- Naples Sings (1953)
- Love Song (1954)
- Letter from Naples (1954)
- Tragic Ballad (1954)
- Naples Is Always Naples (1954)
- Vendicata! (1955)
- New Moon (1955)
- La sposa (1958)
- Kill or Be Killed (1966)
- La pagella (1980)
