= Ugo D'Alessio =

Italian actor (1909–1979)

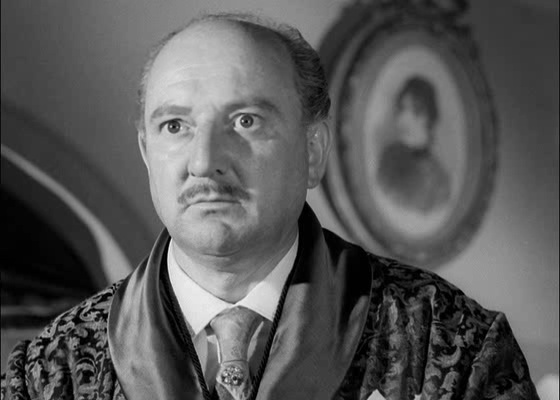
- D'Alessio in the movie Carmela è una bambola (1958)
- Born: 26 August 1909; Naples, Kingdom of Italy
- Died: 16 February 1979 (aged 69); Naples, Italy
- Other name: Pasquale D'Alessio
- Occupation: Actor
- Years active: 1947–1978 (film)

Ugo D'Alessio (26 August 1909 – 16 February 1979) was an Italian film actor.

== Selected filmography ==
- Malaspina (1947) - Nicola
- Madunnella (1948) - Il ragionere, padre di Maria
- Assunta Spina (1948) - Epanimonda Pesce
- Red Moon (1951) - Gesualdo
- One Hundred Little Mothers (1952)
- Toto in Color (1952)
- The City Stands Trial (1952) - Gennaro Ruotolo (uncredited)
- Rosalba, la fanciulla di Pompei (1952) - Nicolino
- Voto di marinaio (1953)
- Soli per le strade (1953)
- Two Nights with Cleopatra (1954) - Cocis
- Mid-Century Loves (1954) - The Octopus Vendor (segment "Napoli 1943")
- Where Is Freedom? (1954) - Un giudice
- The Doctor of the Mad (1954)
- Questi fantasmi (1954)
- Milanese in Naples (1954) - Cantante col mandolino
- I giorni più belli (1956) - Il napoletano che annota la targa
- Carmela è una bambola (1958) - Don Arcangelo Di Capua
- La sposa (1958) - Il prete
- Addio per sempre! (1958)
- Gastone (1960) - The scornful Comedian at 'Salone Margherita' (uncredited)
- La contessa azzurra (1960) - Armandino
- Appuntamento a Ischia (1960) - Antonio Argenti
- Everybody Go Home (1960) - Prete
- Garibaldi (1961) - Secretary
- Totòtruffa 62 (1961) - Decio Cavallo
- The Last Judgment (1961)
- Gold of Rome (1961) - Piperno the goldsmith
- Toto vs. the Four (1963) - Di Sabato
- The Little Nuns (1963) - Movie director
- Shoot Loud, Louder... I Don't Understand (1966)
- The Day of the Owl (1968) - Second Mafioso at the Banquet
- Caprice Italian Style (1968) - Il commissario di PS (segment "Mostro della domenica, Il")
- Operazione ricchezza (1968)
- Ninì Tirabusciò: la donna che inventò la mossa (1970)
- Gang War in Naples (1972) - Pietro - Tonino's Father
- Don't Torture a Duckling (1972) - Captain Modesti
- The Adventures of Pinocchio (1972, TV Mini-Series) - Mastro Ciliegia
- Bread and Chocolate (1974) - Pietro
- Il gioco della verità (1974)
- Una sera c'incontrammo (1975) - Aniello Capuozzo

== Bibliography ==
- Goble, Alan. The Complete Index to Literary Sources in Film. Walter de Gruyter, 1999.
