= Good Folk's Sunday =

1953 film by Anton Giulio Majano

- Directed by: Anton Giulio Majano
- Written by: Anton Giulio Majano; Vasco Pratolini; Gian Domenico Giagni; Massimo Mida
- Cinematography: Bitto Albertini
- Music by: Nino Rota
- Release date: 1953
- Country: Italy
- Language: Italian

Good Folk's Sunday (Italian: La domenica della buona gente) is a 1953 Italian comedy film directed by Anton Giulio Majano.

== Plot ==
Several destinies are displayed as the soccer teams of Rome and Naples meet, with Sophia Loren in one of the episodes.

== Cast ==
- Maria Fiore: Sandra
- Sophia Loren: Ines
- Renato Salvatori: Giulio
- Vittorio Sanipoli: Conti
- Ave Ninchi: Elvira
- Alberto Talegalli: Clemente
- Carlo Romano: Malesci
- Mariolina Bovo: Marisa
- Memmo Carotenuto: Amleto
- Nino Manfredi: Lello
- Turi Pandolfini: Priest
- Piero Palermini: Pieri
- Gisella Monaldi: Gisella
- Alfredo Martinelli: Valli
- Laura Tiberti: Maria
- Eduardo Passarelli: Doorman
- Nino Vingelli
- Fiorenzo Fiorentini
- Bice Valori
- Rina Franchetti
- Carlo Giuffrè
- Antonio Acqua
