= Roberto Amoroso =

Screenwriter and film producer

- Born: 7 January 1911; Naples, Campania, Italy
- Died: 3 February 1994 (aged 83); Naples, Campania, Italy
- Occupations: Writer, Producer
- Years active: 1947 - 1973 (film)

Roberto Amoroso (Italian pronunciation: [roˈbɛrto amoˈroːzo; -oːso]; 1911–1994) was an Italian screenwriter and film producer. Amoroso came from Naples and his films were generally either shot or set in the city.

== Selected filmography ==
- Malaspina (1947)
- Madunnella (1948)
- Malavita (1951)
- Melody of Love (1954)
- Donatella (1956)
- The Lightship (1963)
- Gang War (1971)

== Bibliography ==
- Moine, Raphaëlle. Cinema Genre. John Wiley & Sons, 2006.
