= Whom God Forgives =

1957 film

- Film poster
- Directed by: José María Forqué
- Written by: José María Forqué; Alfonso Sastre; Natividad Zaro
- Produced by: Ángel Monís
- Starring: Francisco Rabal
- Cinematography: Cecilio Paniagua
- Edited by: Julio Peña
- Release date: 7 May 1957
- Running time: 92 minutes
- Country: Spain
- Language: Spanish

Whom God Forgives (Spanish: Amanecer en Puerta Oscura) is a 1957 Spanish action film directed by José María Forqué. At the 7th Berlin International Film Festival it won the Silver Bear Extraordinary Prize of the Jury award.

== Plot ==
Set in Andalusia in the 19th century, it reflects the persecution of some people with blood crimes that they have committed due to forced circumstances. Juan Cuenca, a miner, who has killed the foreman of the mine and his friend, an engineer who, for defending him, has killed the head of the mine. All of them live as refugees in the Andalusian mountains, persecuted by the Civil Guard, and intend to embark for America.

The film reflects the tradition of freeing a prisoner during Holy Week in Malaga because of the image of Jesús el Rico.

== Cast ==
- Francisco Rabal - Juan Cuenca
- Luis Peña - Andrés
- Alberto Farnese - Pedro
- Isabel de Pomés - Rosario
- Luisella Boni
- José Marco Davó - (as Marco Davo)
- José Sepúlveda
- Barta Barry
- Josefina Serratosa
- Santiago Rivero
- Ricardo Canales
- Antonio Puga
- Valeriano Andrés
- Rafael Calvo Revilla
- Alfonso Muñoz
- Salvador Soler Marí
- Casimiro Hurtado
- Adela Carboné
