= Sunset in Naples =

1956 film by Guido Brignone

- Directed by: Guido Brignone
- Written by: Guido Brignone; Ivo Perilli; Elio Petri; Gianni Puccini; Paolo Ricci
- Produced by: Giovanni Addessi
- Starring: Carlo Giuffrè; Maria Fiore; Giacomo Rondinella
- Cinematography: Gianni Di Venanzo
- Edited by: Gabriele Varriale
- Music by: Michele Cozzoli; Salvatore Gambardella
- Production companies: Titanus; Trionfalcine
- Distributed by: Titanus
- Release date: 5 April 1956
- Running time: 94 minutes
- Country: Italy
- Language: Italian

Sunset in Naples (Italian: Quando tramonta il sole) is a 1955 Italian musical melodrama film directed by Guido Brignone and starring Carlo Giuffrè, Maria Fiore and Giacomo Rondinella.

The film's art direction was by Ottavio Scotti. It was shot in Eastmancolor.

== Cast ==
- Carlo Giuffrè as Salvatore Gambardella
- Maria Fiore as Carolina
- Giacomo Rondinella as Peppino
- Abbe Lane as Eugenia Fougère
- Alberto Rabagliati as L'impresario milanese
- Franco Caruso as Gennarino
- Giovanni Filidoro
- Marcella Ferri
- Eduardo Passarelli
- Nietta Zocchi
- Leonardo Severini
- Eugenio Maggi
- Nerio Bernardi
- Mario Carotenuto as Ferdinando Bideri
- Charles Vanel

== Bibliography ==
- Emiliano Morreale. Così piangevano: il cinema melò nell'Italia degli anni Cinquanta. Donzelli Editore, 2011.
