= The Song of the Heart (1955 film) =

1955 film directed by Carlo Campogalliani

- Film poster
- Directed by: Carlo Campogalliani
- Written by: Mario Amendola; Carlo Campogalliani; Piero De Bernardi; Guglielmo Santangelo
- Produced by: Felice Felicioni
- Starring: Milly Vitale; Alberto Farnese; Dante Maggio
- Cinematography: Bitto Albertini
- Edited by: Otello Colangeli
- Music by: Luigi Malatesta
- Production company: Jonia Film
- Distributed by: Variety Distribution
- Release date: 29 September 1955
- Running time: 99 minutes
- Country: Italy
- Language: Italian

The Song of the Heart (Italian: La canzone del cuore) is a 1955 Italian melodrama film directed by Carlo Campogalliani and starring Milly Vitale, Alberto Farnese and Dante Maggio.

The film's sets were designed by Ivo Battelli.

== Cast ==
- Milly Vitale as Lucia
- Alberto Farnese as Sandro
- Dante Maggio as Carletto, il giardiniere
- Marisa Merlini as Silvia
- Germana Paolieri as La contessa
- Maria Grazia Sandri as Ornella
- Marina Campo Re
- Anna Campori as Maddalena
- Giorgio Gandos
- Loris Gizzi
- Nico Pepe
- Domenico Serra
- Edoardo Toniolo
- Enrico Urbini
- Emma Baron
- Tina Lamar
- Gina Mascetti
- Duccio Sissia

== Bibliography ==
- James Robert Parish & Kingsley Canham. Film Directors Guide: Western Europe. Scarecrow Press, 1976.
