= The Conqueror of the Orient =

1960 film

- Directed by: Tanio Boccia
- Written by: Tanio Boccia; Gianni Mauro; Mario Moroni; John Davis Hart
- Produced by: Diego Alchimede; Nino Misiano; Giorgio Morra; Giuliano Simonetti
- Starring: Gianna Maria Canale; Rik Battaglia; Irène Tunc
- Cinematography: Vincenzo Seratrice; Luciano Trasatti
- Edited by: Mario Sansoni
- Music by: Giovanni Fassino
- Production companies: Tabos Film; Produzioni Europee Associati (PEA)
- Distributed by: Variety Distribution
- Release date: 21 October 1960
- Running time: 102 minutes
- Country: Italy
- Language: Italian

The Conqueror of the Orient (Italian: Il conquistatore dell'Oriente) is a 1960 Italian adventure film directed by Tanio Boccia and starring Gianna Maria Canale, Rik Battaglia and Irène Tunc. It is set several centuries ago in the Middle East, part of a group of Arabian Nights-inspired films made in Italy during the era.

The plot centres around a lowly fisherman saving a princess from the kingdom's oppressive rulers, then discovering that he is the true heir to the throne.

== Cast ==
- Gianna Maria Canale as Dinazar / Zobeida
- Rik Battaglia as Nadir
- Irène Tunc as Fatima
- Fosco Giachetti as Omar, Nadir's Father
- Paul Muller as Sultan Dakar
- Giulio Donnini as Rato, the Chancellor
- Tatiana Farnese as Katiscia
- Franco Balducci as Nureddin, Nadir's Companion
- Attilio Torelli as Leader of the Red Robes Tribe
- Riccardo Ferri as Leader of the White Robes Tribe
- Edda Ferronao as Fatima' Maid #1
- Myriam Cordella as Fatima' Maid #2
- Aldo Pini as Chief of Prison Guards
- Renato Montalbano

== Production ==
The film was produced by Euro Associata e Tabos Films. It was shot at the De Laurentiis Studios in Rome.

== Reception ==
At the time of its release, the film was badly received by critics. In his retrospective analysis, Massimo Moscati praised Boccia's ability in striking a balance between narrative clarity and a more overtly spectacular approach.
