= The Prince with the Red Mask =

- Directed by: Leopoldo Savona
- Written by: Giovanni Addessi; Vittorio Carpignano; Massimo Mida; Leopoldo Savona
- Starring: Frank Latimore; Maria Fiore; Yvonne Furneaux
- Cinematography: Vincenzo Seratrice
- Edited by: Gabriele Varriale
- Music by: Carlo Innocenzi
- Production company: Trionfalcine
- Distributed by: Trionfalcine
- Release date: 13 August 1955
- Running time: 84 minutes
- Country: Italy
- Language: Italian

The Prince with the Red Mask (Italian: Il principe dalla maschera rossa) is a 1955 Italian historical adventure film directed by Leopoldo Savona and starring Frank Latimore, Maria Fiore and Yvonne Furneaux.

The film's sets were designed by the art director Ottavio Scotti.

== Cast ==
- Frank Latimore as Masuccio, il principe dalla maschera rossa
- Maria Fiore as Isabella
- Yvonne Furneaux as Laura
- Elio Steiner as Il capitano Alberino
- Camillo Pilotto as Ser Gaspare
- Livio Lorenzon as Monaldo
- Maria Gambarelli as Giselda
- Mario Sailer
- Vincent Barbi
- Sante Simeone
- Tony Angeli
- Loris Bazzocchi
- Luciano Benetti
- Sergio Fantoni

== Bibliography ==
- Curti, Roberto. Riccardo Freda: The Life and Works of a Born Filmmaker. McFarland, 13 Mar 2017.
