= Rosalia Maggio =

Italian actress, dancer, singer and showgirl (1921–1995)

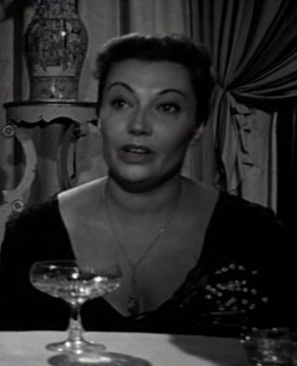
- Born: 1 May 1921; Palermo, Kingdom of Italy
- Died: 25 July 1995 (aged 74); Naples, Italy
- Occupations: Actress; dancer; singer; showgirl

Rosalia Maggio (1 May 1921 – 25 July 1995) was an Italian actress, dancer, singer and showgirl. She was the youngest of the Maggio siblings.

== Biography ==
Born in Palermo, she was the daughter of two comedian actors and sister of actors Enzo, Dante, Beniamino and Pupella Maggio. She debuted at 5 years old as a child actress. Maggio appeared widely in films, theatrical plays, radio dramas, revues, sceneggiate, and operetta. She died of cancer in Naples at 75.

== Selected filmography ==
=== Film ===
- 1936: The Two Sergeants – (uncredited)
- 1954: Desiderio 'e sole – Aunt Clara Di Capua
- 1954: Letter from Naples – Concetta
- 1955: Tragic Ballad – cameriera casa Accardi
- 1956: Te stò aspettanno
- 1958: Toto, Peppino and the Fanatics – Anita
- 1958: Carosello di canzoni – Signora Concetta Apicella
- 1959: Fantasmi e ladri
- 1961: Revenge of the Conquered
- 1961: Day by Day, Desperately – Adele
- 1962: Roaring Years – Donna Nunzia Acquamano
- 1962: The Four Days of Naples – Scared Woman (uncredited)
- 1963: The Girl from Parma – Iris
- 1963: La donna degli altri è sempre più bella – Lucia Marcani (segment "La dirittura morale")
- 1963: Giacobbe, l'uomo che lottò con Dio
- 1964: I due toreri
- 1965: Made in Italy – Another Guest (segment "2 'Il Lavoro', episode 2")
- 1965: Menage all'italiana – Stella's Mother
- 1972: Don't Torture a Duckling – Mrs. Spriano – Michele's Mother
- 1974: Blood Brothers – Amalia Scognamiglio
- 1978: Nikkolina – Aunt Sofia
- 1980: La pagella
- 1981: I figli... so' pezzi 'e core – Donna Concetta
- 1981: Nel segno del leone
- 1985: The Two Lives of Mattia Pascal – Vedova Pescatore
- 1988: Chiari di luna – Suor Resurrezione

=== Television ===
- 1964: Michele Settespiriti – Elvira
- 1987–1993: Eurocops
