= Alberto Farnese =

Italian actor

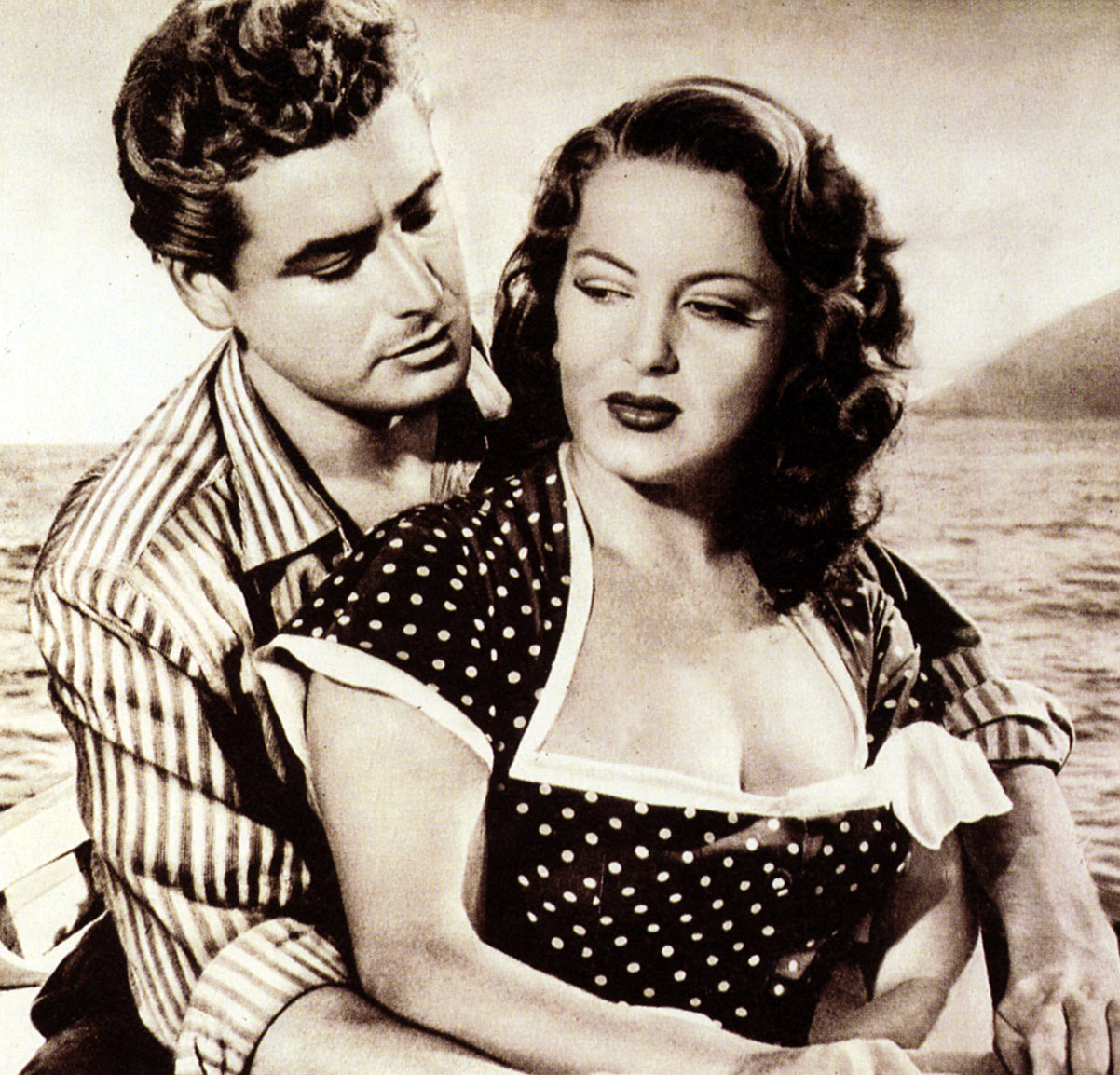
- Farnese and Yvonne Sanson in Falsehood (1952)
- Born: 3 June 1926; Palombara Sabina, Italy
- Died: 2 June 1996 (aged 69); Rome, Italy
- Occupation: Actor
- Years active: 1951–1989

Alberto Farnese (3 June 1926 – 2 June 1996) was an Italian actor. He appeared in more than 80 films and television shows from 1951 to 1989. He starred in the film Whom God Forgives, which won the Silver Bear Extraordinary Prize of the Jury award at the 7th Berlin International Film Festival.

== Selected filmography ==
- Nobody's Children (1951) - Poldo
- Rome 11:00 (1952) - Augusto
- Falsehood (1952) - Gianni
- Prisoners of Darkness (1952)
- Legione straniera (1953) - Alberto Gherardi
- Angels of Darkness (1954) - The Sportsman
- Disonorata - Senza colpa (1954) - Amedeo Cupiello
- The Two Orphans (1954)
- The Gold of Naples (1954) - Alfredo - l'amante di Sofia (segment "Pizze a credito")
- Orphan of the Ghetto (1954)
- Disowned (1954) - barone Giulio Colizzi
- Due lacrime (1954) - Mario Mancini
- The White Angel (1955) - Poldo
- The Song of the Heart (1955) - Sandro
- Un palco all'opera (1956)
- Torna piccina mia! (1955) - Alberto
- Vendicata! (1956)
- Storia di una minorenne (1956)
- Un giglio infranto (1956) - Il conte Andrea Posterla
- Porta un bacione a Firenze (1956) - Alberto Cei
- Mamma sconosciuta (1956) - Aldo Martini
- Whom God Forgives (1957) - Pedro
- Pirate of the Half Moon (1957) - Alonzo de Carmona / Ugo van Berg
- The Angel of the Alps (1957) - Massimo
- Un amore senza fine (1958) - Ing. Alberto Danieli
- Conspiracy of the Borgias (1959) - Enzo de Rovena
- Knight Without a Country (1959) - Rizziero - duca di Villalta
- Sheba and the Gladiator (1959) - Marcello
- Caterina Sforza, la leonessa di Romagna (1959) - Girolamo Riario
- Le secret du Chevalier d'Éon (1959) - Serguei Orloff (uncredited)
- The Night of the Great Attack (1959) - Cesare Borgia
- Terror of Oklahoma (1959) - Bogart
- Siege of Syracuse (1960) - Marcello
- The Warrior Empress (1960) - Larico
- Colossus and the Amazon Queen (1960) - Losco, il pirata
- The Giants of Thessaly (1960) - Adrasto
- Three Faces of Sin (1961) - (uncredited)
- Queen of the Nile (1961) - Dakim
- The Giant of Metropolis (1961) - (uncredited)
- The Wonders of Aladdin (1961) - Bandit Chieftain
- Suleiman the Conqueror (1961) - Gaspard
- The Corsican Brothers (1961) - Gaspare
- Caccia all'uomo (1961) - Paolo
- Kerim, Son of the Sheik (1962) - Omar
- Gladiator of Rome (1962) - Magistrate Vezio Rufo
- I Don Giovanni della Costa Azzurra (1962) - Commendatore milanese
- The Executioner of Venice (1963) - Michele Arcà
- The Lion of St. Mark (1963) - Titta
- Revenge of the Black Knight (1963) - Amedeo Aniante
- Vino, whisky e acqua salata (1963)
- The Two Gladiators (1964) - Leto
- Sandokan to the Rescue (1964) - Tremal Naik
- Hercules of the Desert (1964) - Masura
- Sandokan Against the Leopard of Sarawak (1964) - Tremal Naik
- Dollar of Fire (1966) - Senator Dana Harper
- Five Dollars for Ringo (1966) - Mayor Aldo Rudell
- Río maldito (1966) - Torrence
- Kill or Be Killed (1966) - Chester Griffith
- Honeymoon, Italian Style (1966) - Portiere dell'Hotel
- Addio mamma (1967) - Paolo Solari
- The Magnificent Tony Carrera (1968) - Rick
- The Wedding Trip (1969) - Rossano Bertorelli
- Una ragazza di Praga (1969)
- Veinte pasos para la muerte (1970) - Aleck Kellaway
- Tell Me (1970)
- Fighters from Ave Maria (1970) - John Parker
- Love Me Strangely (1971) - L'ami d'Alain
- Il ritorno del gladiatore più forte del mondo (1971) - Tullio Valerio
- Gang War in Naples (1972) - Croupier
- Storia di fifa e di coltello - Er seguito d'er più (1972)
- The Dominici Affair (1973) - Un journaliste italien
- Tony Arzenta (1973) - The Man who meets Carré in the nightclub
- Supermen Against the Orient (1973) - Colonnello Roger
- Il bacio di una morta (1974) - Lawyer of Guido
- White Horses of Summer (1975) - Arturo
- Il giustiziere di mezzogiorno (1975) - Signor Lorenzi
- Swindle (1977) - Lawyer Ferrante
- Assassinio sul Tevere (1979) - Manfredo Ruffini
- Zappatore (1980) - Mike Barker - Nancy's father
- Crema, cioccolata e pa... prika (1981) - Bonetti
- I mercenari raccontano (1985) - Johnson, il mercenario
- Detective School Dropouts (1986) - Don Falcone
- White Apache (1987) - The Governor
- Scalps (1987) - Colonel Connor
- Fiori di zucca (1989) - Padre di Enzo
- Diritto di vivere (1989)
- Vite perdute (1992) - Avvocato di Rosario
