= Red Love (1952 film) =

1952 film

- Directed by: Aldo Vergano
- Written by: Marianna Sirca by Grazia Deledda
- Produced by: Raffaele Colamonici; Umberto Montesi
- Starring: Marina Berti; Massimo Serato; Guido Celano
- Cinematography: Mario Albertelli; Bitto Albertini
- Edited by: Elena Zanoli
- Music by: Franco Casavola
- Production company: C.M Film
- Distributed by: Indipendenti Regionali
- Release date: 1952
- Running time: 85 minutes
- Country: Italy
- Language: Italian

Red Love (Italian: Amore rosso - Marianna Sirca) is a 1952 Italian crime melodrama film directed by Aldo Vergano and starring Marina Berti, Massimo Serato and Guido Celano. It was shot at the Cinecittà Studios in Rome. The film's sets were designed by the art director Alberto Boccianti. It is an adaptation of the 1915 Sardinian-set novel Marianna Sirca by Grazia Deledda and is sometimes also known by this title. Location shooting took place around Aggius and Tempio in Gallura rather than the Nuoro setting of the novel. It was not a commercial success on its first release.

== Cast ==
- Marina Berti as Marianna Sirca
- Massimo Serato as Simone Sole
- Guido Celano as Fera
- Arnoldo Foà as Sebastiano
- Marcella Rovena as Fudera
- Mario Corte as Papà Berto
- Mario Terribile as Padre Perlo

== Bibliography ==
- Goble, Alan. The Complete Index to Literary Sources in Film. Walter de Gruyter, 1999.
- Urban, Maria Bonaria. Sardinia on Screen: The Construction of the Sardinian Character in Italian Cinema. Rodopi, 2013.
