= Silvio Orsini =

Italian film actor

- Occupation: Actor
- Years active: 1921–1935

Silvio Orsini was an Italian film actor of the silent and early sound era.

== Selected filmography ==
- Red Love (1921)
- Television (1931)
- Naples in Green and Blue (1935)

== Bibliography ==
- Waldman, Harry. Missing Reels: Lost Films of American and European Cinema. McFarland, 2000.
