= Devil of the Desert Against the Son of Hercules =

- Directed by: Anthony Dawson
- Screenplay by: Guido Maletesta; Arturo Rigel; Andre Tabet
- Story by: Guido Maletesta; Arturo Rigel; Andre Tabet
- Produced by: Luigi Nannerini
- Starring: Kirk Morris; Michele Girardon; Renato Baldini; Mario Feliciani
- Cinematography: Alejandro Ulloa
- Edited by: Otello Colangeli; Antonio Ramirez Loaysa
- Music by: Georges Garvarentz
- Release date: 27 June 1964 (Italy)
- Running time: 114 minutes
- Box office: ₤140.3 million

Devil of the Desert Against the Son of Hercules is a 1964 international co-production filmed in Italy and directed by Anthony Dawson.

== Plot summary ==
An evil and ambitious usurper named Ganor seizes a kingdom by assassinating the Sultan and imprisoning his son Prince Daikor and daughter Princess Soraya to prevent revolt. Princess Soraya is defiant and escapes by leaping out the palace window into a river. She is discovered by a pair of peasants Anthar and the mute Aimu who become her protectors, and later rescuers and avengers against Ganor.

The film concludes in a showdown in a hall of mirrors.

== Cast ==
- Kirk Morris as Anthar
- Michèle Girardon as Princess Soraya
- Renato Baldini as Kamal
- Mario Feliciani as Ganor
- José Jaspe as Akrim
- Manuel Gallardo as Prince Daikor
- Nadine Verdier as Slave Girl

== Release ==
Devil of the Desert Against the Son of Hercules was released on June 27, 1964 in Italy. The film grossed 140,300,000 Italian lire at domestically in Italy.

The film was originally titled Anthar the invincible but was retitled The Devil of the Desert Against the Son of Hercules for inclusion on Avco Embassy's The Sons of Hercules syndicated television series. The series was 14 peplum that were retitled and re-edited to be distributed under the title of The Sons of Hercules.

== See also ==
- List of Italian films of 1964
