= Renato Baldini =

Italian actor (1921–1995)

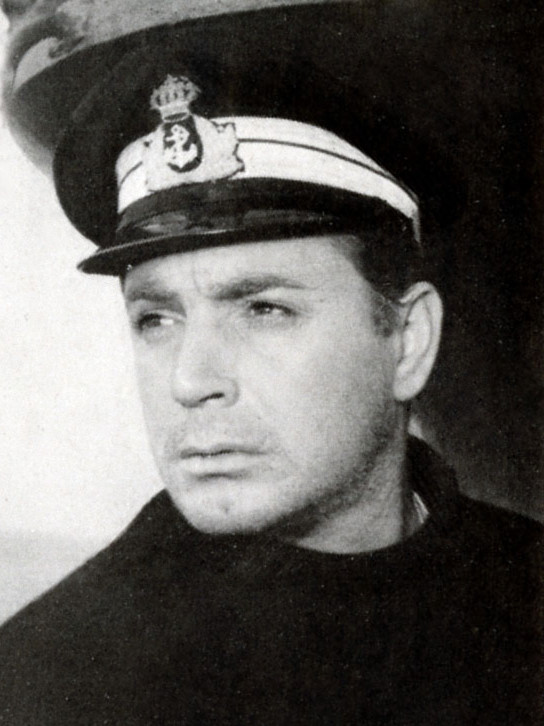
- Renato Baldini in Submarine Attack (1955)
- Born: 18 December 1921; Rome, Italy
- Died: 5 July 1995 (aged 73); Rome, Italy
- Occupation: Actor
- Years active: 1950–1983

Renato Baldini (18 December 1921 – 5 July 1995) was an Italian film actor. He appeared in 87 films between 1950 and 1983. He was born in Rome, Italy.

== Selected filmography ==
- It's Forever Springtime (1950) - Un carabiniere al processo
- Il Mulatto (1950) - Matteo Belfiore
- Il richiamo nella tempesta (1950)
- Behind Closed Shutters (1951) - Primavera
- Four Ways Out (1951) - Paolo Leandri
- Red Moon (1951) - Paolo Cassino
- Carcerato (1951) - Giacomo Marini
- Rosalba, la fanciulla di Pompei (1952) - Vittorio Stelio
- Non ho paura di vivere (1952)
- Nessuno ha tradito (1952)
- The Legend of the Piave (1952) - Don Carlo, capellano
- Drama on the Tiber (1952) - Bruno Rossi
- Delitto al luna park (1952) - Roberto
- Sins of Rome (1953) - Gladiator (uncredited)
- The Wayward Wife (1953) - Luciano Vittoni - L'amante di Gemma
- Carcerato (1953) - Renato
- Theodora, Slave Empress (1954) - Arcas
- Naples Is Always Naples (1954) - Pietro Cafiero
- Orphan of the Ghetto (1954)
- Foglio di via (1954) - Carlo
- Submarine Attack (1955) - Submarine Commandanti
- Nagana (1955) - Maurice Leblond
- La catena dell'odio (1955) - Ing. Mauro Ferri
- Ángeles sin cielo (1957) - Dr. Luis Losada
- Dinanzi a noi il cielo (1957)
- Girls of the Night (1958) - Marco
- Gagliardi e pupe (1958) - Gigi
- Herod the Great (1958) - Claudio
- Head of a Tyrant (1959) - Arbar
- The White Warrior (1959) - Ahmed Khan
- La Garçonnière (1960) - Father
- Esther and the King (1960) - Klydrathes
- La donna di ghiaccio (1960) - Franco Mauri / Franco De Angelis
- Girl with a Suitcase (1961) - Francia
- Gli scontenti (1961) - Il brigadiere
- Armas contra la ley (1961)
- The Slave (1962) - Verulus - Caesar's adjutant
- The Golden Arrow (1962) - Prince of Bassora
- The Black Invaders (1962) - Dominique De Gourges
- The Secret Seven (1963) - Kadem
- Nine Miles to Noon (1963) - Dio Dimou
- The Thief of Damascus (1964) - Uria
- Devil of the Desert Against the Son of Hercules (1964) - Kamal, the Wealthy Sheik
- The Shoot (1964) - Barud
- Giants of Rome (1964) - Drood
- Last of the Renegades (1964) - Col. J.F. Merril
- Among Vultures (1964) - Judge George Leader
- Squillo (1964)
- La vendetta dei gladiatori (1964) - General Ezio
- Berlin, Appointment for the Spies (1965) - Mohamed Belkheir
- Man from Canyon City (1965) - Grieves
- The Desperado Trail (1965) - (uncredited)
- Agent X-77 Orders to Kill (1966) - Dr. Lupescu
- 4 Dollars of Revenge (1966)
- That Man George (1966)
- Sharp-Shooting Twin Sisters (1966) - Farrell
- Snow Devils (1967) - Lt. Jim Harris
- Clint the Stranger (1967) - Calloway - Farmer
- Dynamite Joe (1967) - Jury Nelson
- Avenger X (1967) - Antonio 'Joe' Caruso
- OSS 117 – Double Agent (1968) - MacLeod - un diplomatico della CIA
- Ciccio Forgives, I Don't (1968)
- Carogne si nasce (1968) - Mayor Johnson
- Ms. Stiletto (1969) - Gunther
- Sartana the Gravedigger (1969) - The Judge
- Death Knocks Twice (1969) - Mr. Simmons
- Gli infermieri della mutua (1969) - Ing. Moscati
- Paths of War (1970) - Jeff
- Ma chi t'ha dato la patente? (1970)
- Light the Fuse... Sartana Is Coming (1970) - Nobody (uncredited)
- Principe coronato cercasi per ricca ereditiera (1970) - General Scannapieco
- Armiamoci e partite! (1971) - Giovanni
- My Name Is Mallory... M Means Death (1971) - Col. Todd Hasper
- In the Name of the Italian People (1971) - Ragionier Cerioni
- Who Killed the Prosecutor and Why? (1972) - Marshal Notarantonio
- Return of Halleluja (1972) - Gen. Miranda
- Storia di fifa e di coltello - Er seguito d'er più (1972) - Old Man of Borgo
- I pugni di Rocco (1972) - Pietro Colantini
- Rugantino (1973) - Nobile
- Metti lo diavolo tuo ne lo mio inferno (1973) - Beppe Pirletti
- Pasqualino Cammarata, Frigate Captain (1974)
- Di Tresette ce n'è uno, tutti gli altri son nessuno (1974) - Banker
- Manone il ladrone (1974) - Commissario
- Smiling Maniacs (1975) - Man setting fire
- Loaded Guns (1975) - Ali
- Legend of the Sea Wolf (1975)
- Kidnap Syndicate (1975) - Antonio Polieviti
- A Genius, Two Partners and a Dupe (1975) - Sheriff in saloon
- Sapore di mare 2 - Un anno dopo (1983)
