= Vendicata! =

- Directed by: Giuseppe Vari
- Written by: Giuseppe Vari
- Produced by: Antonio Ferrigno
- Starring: Milly Vitale
- Cinematography: Sergio Pesce
- Music by: Carlo Innocenzi
- Release date: 7 March 1956
- Language: Italian

Vendicata! (i. e. "Vindicated!") is a 1955 Italian melodrama film written and directed by Giuseppe Vari and starring Milly Vitale and Alberto Farnese. It grossed 300 million lire at the Italian box office.

== Cast ==
- Milly Vitale as Anna
- Alberto Farnese as Roberto
- Gino Buzzanca
- Beniamino Maggio
- Giulio Donnini
- Carla Calò
- Erminio Spalla
- Dina De Santis
- Jula De Palma
- Teddy Reno
- Gino Latilla
