= Submarine Attack =

Submarine Attack, aka La Grande Speranza, the Great Hope, Torpedo Zone
- Directed by: Duilio Coletti
- Written by: Oreste Biancoli, Marcаntonio Bragadin, Duilio Coletti, Ennio De Concini
- Produced by: Duilio Coletti, Excelsa Film
- Starring: Lois Maxwell, Renato Baldini, Folco Lulli
- Cinematography: Leonida Barboni
- Edited by: Giuliana Attenni
- Music by: Nino Rota
- Production company: Excelsa Film
- Distributed by: Minerva Film; I.F.E. Releasing Corporation (English version)
- Release date: 1954
- Running time: 86 minutes (English version)
- Country: Italy
- Languages: Italian, dubbed into English

La Grande Speranza (The Big Hope), retitled Submarine Attack and Torpedo Zone in English, is a 1954 Italian anti-war film starring Lois Maxwell, Renato Baldini and Earl Cameron. It won the Special Prize of the Senate of Berlin, and the OCIC Award at the Berlin International Film Festival. Marcantonio Bragadin was an adviser on the film, which was shot inside and on the deck of a real submarine.

== Plot ==
An Italian submarine captain conducts successful attacks on enemy merchant shipping in the eastern Atlantic Ocean during World War II, and then rescues the survivors of his victims, including a member of the Canadian Women's Army Corps (and a dog). The captain's compulsion to save his victims culminates in his taking aboard 24 additional Danish merchant seamen; with no space down below, they are accommodated under the walkway outside the hull, at risk of drowning if the submarine is forced to submerge. He then sails the survivors hundreds of miles across the open ocean on the surface to put them ashore in the Azores.

== Cast ==
- Lois Maxwell - Lt. Lily Donald
- Renato Baldini - The Submarine Commandanti
- Carlo Bellini - Officer
- Aldo Bufi Landi - Lieutenant
- Earl Cameron - Johnny Brown, POW
- David Carbonari
- Ludovico Ceriana
- Carlo Delle Piane - Ciccio
- Edward Fleming - Jean Cartier
- José Jaspe - Spanish POW
- Paolo Panelli
- Rudy Solinas
- Henri Vidon - Robert Steiner
- Folco Lulli - Nostromo, First Mate
- Guido Bizzarri
