= Agent X-77 Orders to Kill =

1966 film directed by Maurice Cloche

- Directed by: Maurice Cloche
- Written by: Eddy Ghilain; Maurice Cloche; Odette Cloche
- Starring: Gérard Barray; Sylva Koscina
- Cinematography: Juan Gelpí
- Music by: Georges Garvarentz
- Release date: 1966
- Language: French

Agent X-77 Orders to Kill (French: Baraka sur X 13, Spanish: Operación Silencio, Italian: Agente X77 ordine di uccidere, also known as Baraka for Secret Service) is a 1966 French-Spanish-Italian spy film directed by Maurice Cloche and starring Gérard Barray and Sylva Koscina. Silvio Siano is credited as co-director in the Italian version of the film (credited as "Edgar Lawson") due to co-production obligations. It is loosely based on the novel Silence clinique by Eddy Ghilain.

== Cast ==
- Gérard Barray as Serge Vadile, Agent X-77 (Agent X 13 in France)
- Sylva Koscina as Mania
- Agnès Spaak as Ingrid
- José Suárez as Franck
- Yvette Lebon as Elvire
- Renato Baldini as Dr. Lupescu
- Gemma Cuervo as Solange
- Gérard Tichy as Dr. Reichmann
- Luis Induni as M. Klein
- Aldo Bufi Landi
- Giacomo Furia

== Release ==
Agent X-77 Orders to Kill was released in France in 1966 as Baraka sur X 13.
