= New Moon (1955 film) =

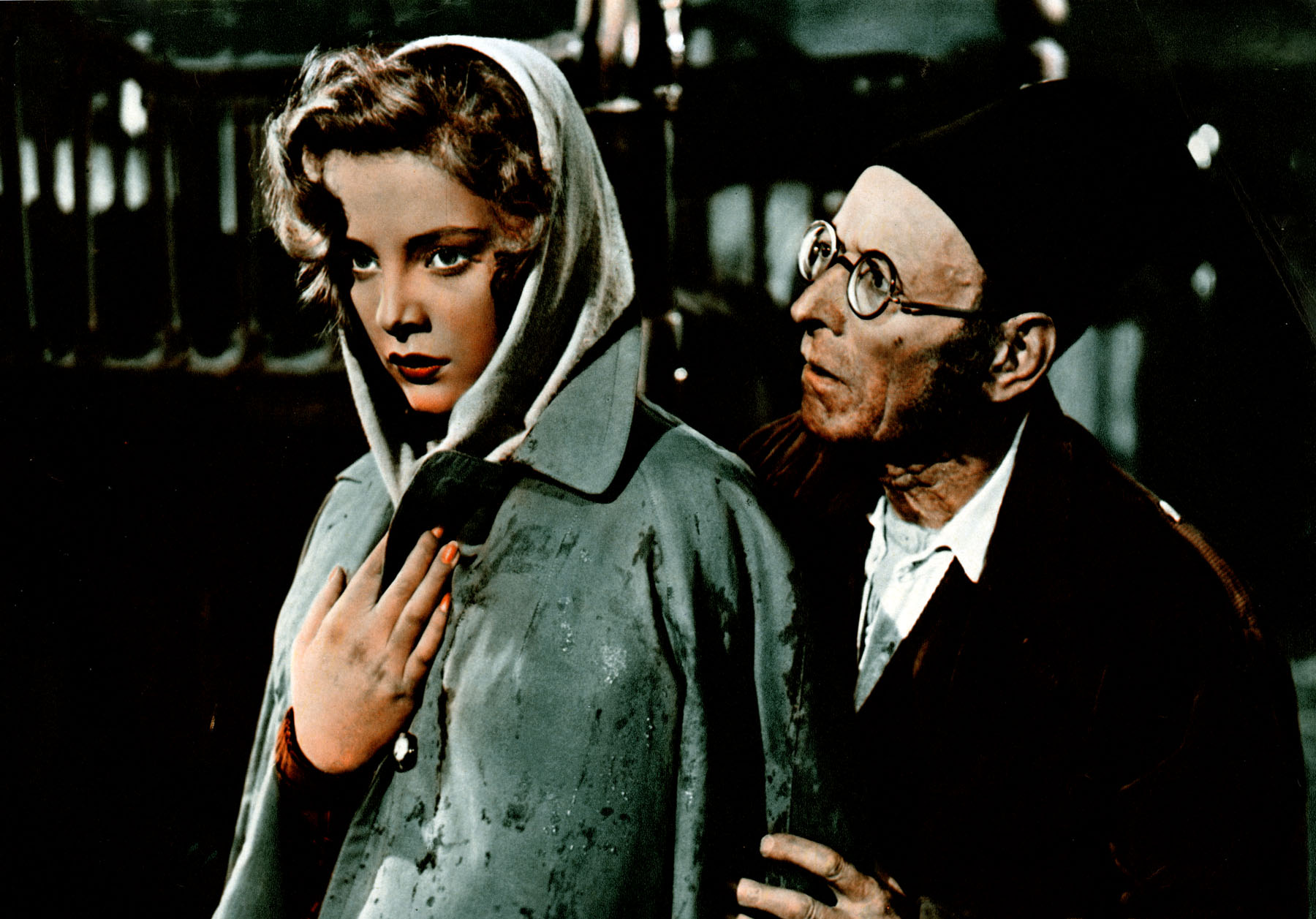
- Virna Lisi and Turi Pandolfini in a scene of the film
- Directed by: Luigi Capuano
- Written by: Alfredo Giannetti; Vinicio Marinucci; Luigi Capuano
- Produced by: Domenico Forges Davanzati
- Starring: Achille Togliani; Virna Lisi; Eduardo Ciannelli
- Cinematography: Mario Albertelli
- Edited by: Jolanda Benvenuti
- Music by: Mario Nascimbene
- Release date: 12 May 1955 (Italy)
- Running time: 92 minutes
- Country: Italy
- Language: Italian

New Moon (Italian: Luna nova) is a 1955 Italian musical crime melodrama film directed by Luigi Capuano.

== Plot summary ==
Giovanni Randi, the son of a landowner, doesn't have an affection for rural life. When he ventures to the city in pursuit of a livelihood, he crosses paths with Amira, a foreigner, and becomes enamored with her. However, Amira is an unscrupulous woman with designs on extracting the money necessary to rescue a nightclub from financial ruin. She shares ownership of the club with Pierre, whom she presents as her brother but is, in fact, her lover.

Invited to spend several days in the countryside at Giovanni's father's estate, Amira, burdened by a belated pang of conscience, rejects Giovanni's marriage proposals. Under the persistent urging of his father and partly motivated by his affection for Lucia, a young woman raised in his household who secretly harbors feelings for him, Giovanni decides to take charge of the family farm.

Upon his return to the city, Giovanni once again encounters Amira, reigniting his previous passion for her. Fearing for her future, Lucia, who is carrying Giovanni's child, travels to the city to speak with him. Unable to locate him at his lodgings, Lucia converses with Amira and implores her to relinquish the man she loves. Amira feigns agreement with the young woman's plea but secretly intends to elope with Giovanni.

Pierre, unwilling to lose Amira, discloses his genuine relationship with her to Giovanni. Giovanni wants nothing further to do with Amira, leading to a confrontation between Giovanni and Pierre, who attempts to blackmail him. A physical altercation ensues, resulting in Pierre's injury. As Giovanni departs, Amira seizes the firearm that Giovanni had dropped and uses it to fatally shoot Pierre. Giovanni is accused of murder, subjected to a trial, and subsequently convicted. As the judge pronounces the guilty verdict, Amira, consumed by remorse, confesses to her crime.

== Cast ==
- Achille Togliani as Giovanni Randi
- Virna Lisi as Lucia
- Eduardo Ciannelli as Don Giuseppe
- Barbara Shelley as Amira
- Beniamino Maggio as Beniamino
- Turi Pandolfini as Domenico
- Leda Gloria as Mother of Giovanni
- Marc Lawrence as Pierre
- Carlo Tamberlani as Lawyer
