= Salvatore Papaccio =

Italian opera singer

Salvatore Papaccio (June 23, 1890 – December 25, 1977) was an Italian operatic tenor and an exponent of Canzone Napoletana.

== Biography ==
Born in Naples in the last decade of the 19th century, Salvatore Papaccio early began to demonstrate his predisposition to music. During the years and with the strengthening of his voice, his success began to spread. He debuted in Teatro San Carlo in 1908 under the direction of Maestro Campanini in the role of the sailor in Wagner's Tristan und Isolde. Since then on, he had the opportunity to participate to numerous works, 123, directed by illustrious directors like Pietro Mascagni, Tullio Serafin, Riccardo Zandonai and Arturo Toscanini. One anecdote about him is that of the visit of the monarch of the empire of Rising Sun Hirohito in Naples, where Papaccio began to sing the songs of his city in the reception of the admiralty, and obtaining a standing ovation.

After 56 years of uninterrupted interpretations performed mostly in Teatro San Carlo, he decided to leave it in 1963, obtaining a diploma for his career dedicated with success to the music.

Among other things, he is also famous to be one of so-called "3 P" of Canzone Napoletana, together with Gennaro Pasquariello and Vittorio Parisi.

His most famous songs are:

Quatto stelle, Suonno d'artista, 'A risa, Silenzio cantatore, 'Ndifferenza, Guappo songh'io, Gennarino Buonocore, Brinneso, Marenaro traduto, 'O varcaiuolo, 'A zingara, Napule e Maria, Varca Napulitana.

== Filmography ==
- Naples in Green and Blue directed by Armando Fizzarotti (1935)
