= Melody of Love (1952 film) =

1952 film

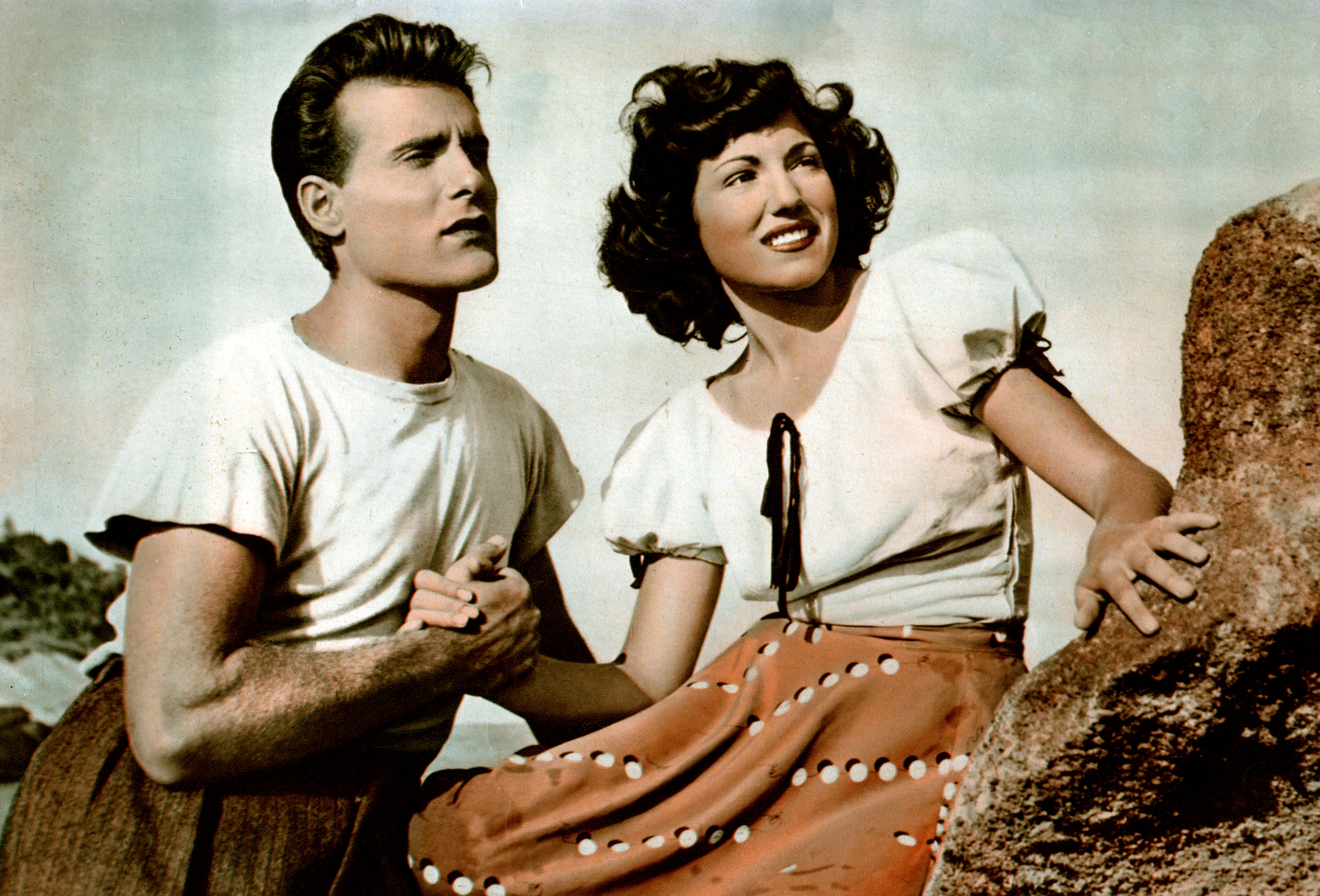
- Still with Rondinella and Fiore
- Directed by: Mario Costa
- Written by: Anton Giulio Majano; Mario Costa; Roberto Amoroso
- Story by: Roberto Amoroso
- Produced by: Roberto Amoroso
- Starring: Giacomo Rondinella; Maria Fiore; Nadia Gray
- Cinematography: Francesco Izzarelli
- Edited by: Renzo Lucidi
- Music by: Gino Filippini
- Production company: Sud Film Produzione Cinematografica
- Distributed by: Variety Distribution
- Release date: 29 October 1952
- Running time: 96 minutes
- Country: Italy
- Language: Italian

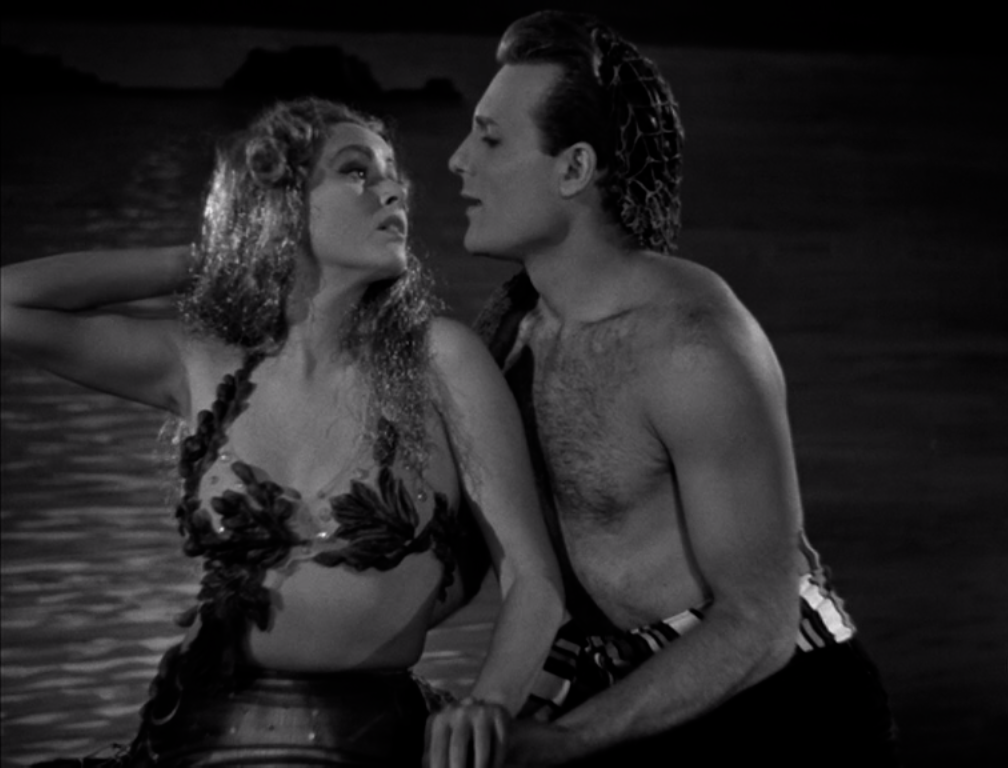
Nadia Gray and Giacomo Rondinella

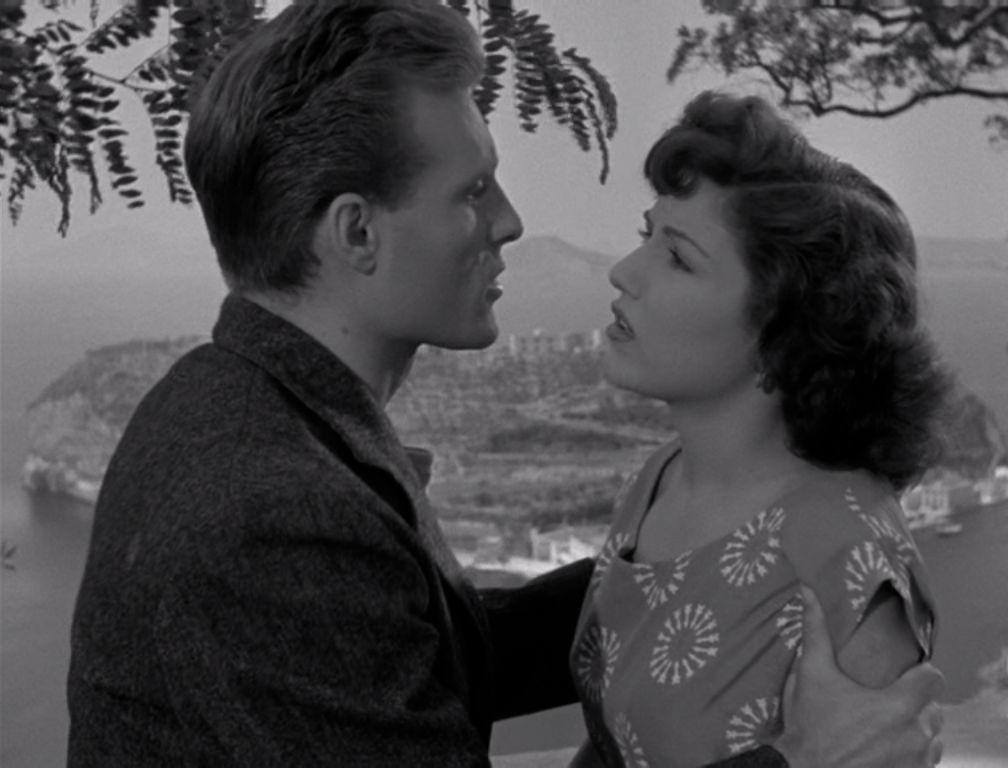
Rondinella with Maria Fiore

Melody of Love or Singing City (Italian: Città canora) is a 1952 Italian musical melodrama film directed by Mario Costa and starring Giacomo Rondinella, Maria Fiore, and Nadia Gray.

It was shot at Cinecitta Studios in Rome and on location in Naples. The film's sets were designed by the art director Lamberto Giovagnoli.

== Cast ==
- Nadia Gray as Nadia Sandor
- Maria Fiore as Maria Morelli
- Giacomo Rondinella as Giacomo D'Angeli
- Tina Pica as Concetta
- Paola Borboni as Anna
- Carlo Romano as Commendator Ferrario
- Mirko Ellis as Renato Scala
- Giovanni Grasso as Don Salvatore Morelli
- Giuseppe Porelli as Don Raffaele Scotto
- Leila Calabrese as Governante di Don Raffaele
- Dante and Beniamino Maggio as Pasquale and Nicola
- Amalia Pellegrini as Amalia
- Vittorio Bottone
- Salvatore Cafiero
- Arturo Gigliati
- Luigi De Simone

== Bibliography ==
- Chiti, Roberto & Poppi, Roberto. Dizionario del cinema italiano: Dal 1945 al 1959. Gremese Editore, 1991.
- Marlow-Mann, Alex. The New Neapolitan Cinema. Edinburgh University Press, 2011.
