= Naples Is Always Naples =

- Directed by: Armando Fizzarotti
- Written by: Mario Caiano; Armando Fizzarotti; Ettore Maria Fizzarotti
- Starring: Lea Padovani; Renato Baldini; Ubaldo Lay
- Cinematography: Guglielmo Garroni
- Edited by: Otello Colangeli
- Music by: Franco Langella
- Production company: Moni Caiano
- Distributed by: Indipendenti Regionali
- Release date: 11 December 1954
- Running time: 95 minutes
- Country: Italy
- Language: Italian

Naples Is Always Naples (Italian: Napoli è sempre Napoli) is a 1954 Italian musical melodrama film directed by Armando Fizzarotti and starring Lea Padovani, Renato Baldini and Ubaldo Lay.

The film's sets were designed by the art director Franco Lolli.

== Cast ==
- Lea Padovani as Carmela Gargiulo
- Renato Baldini as Pietro Cafiero
- Ubaldo Lay as Il tunisino
- Beniamino Maggio as Un pescatore
- Valeria Moriconi as Doris
- Carlo Ninchi as Andrea Cafiero
- Tina Pica as Donna Bettina
- Giuseppe Porelli
- Alberto Sorrentino
- Franco Ricci as Franco Ricco
- Achille Togliani as Carlo Rindi
- Mimo Billi
- Fedele Gentile
- Amedeo Girardi
- Salvo Libassi
- Mario Passante
- Anna Pretolani as Mariannina

== Bibliography ==
- Chiti, Roberto & Poppi, Roberto. Dizionario del cinema italiano: Dal 1945 al 1959. Gremese Editore, 1991.
