= Lina Gennari =

Italian actress and operetta singer

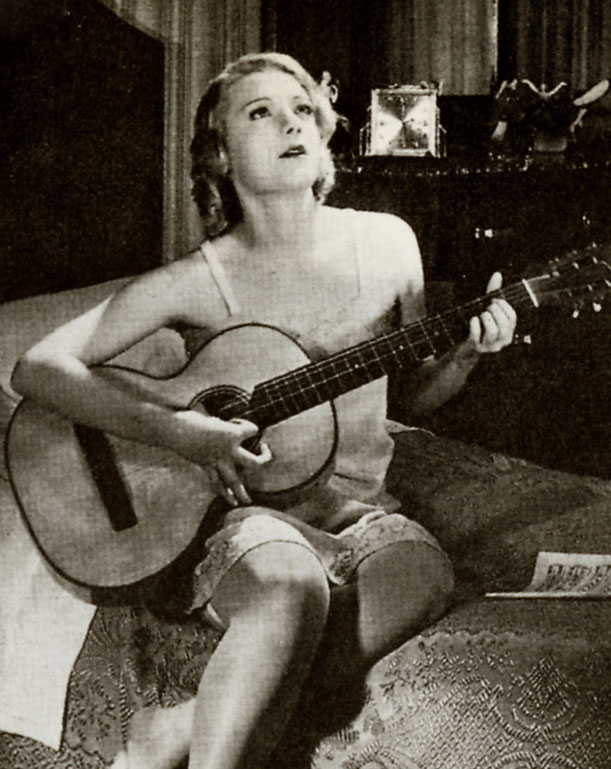
- Born: 22 March 1911; Bologna, Kingdom of Italy
- Died: 11 October 1997 (aged 86); Rome, Italy
- Occupation: Actress

Carolina "Lina" Gennari (22 March 1911 – 11 October 1997) was an Italian actress and operetta singer.

Born in Bologna, she made her debut in the early 1920s in the Schwarz stage company, and she had her first role as prima donna in the operetta Al cavallino bianco. She achieved great success on stage in 1939 with the revue Se un'idea mi porta fortuna and then in 1940 with Nuto Navarrini's Vicino alle stelle. She appeared in several films between 1933 and 1955, notably playing the greedy landlady in Vittorio De Sica's Umberto D..

== Filmography ==
Year	Title	Role	Notes
1933	Tourist Train	Lina	
1935	Naples in Green and Blue		
1937	It Was I!	Fiammetta	
1944	In cerca di felicità		
1946	Eugenia Grandet	Marquise D'Aubrion	
1952	Umberto D.	Antonia Belloni	
1955	The Sign of Venus	Signora Pina	
1955	Il padrone sono me		(final film role)
