= Hell Raiders of the Deep =

1953 film by Duilio Coletti

Hell Raiders of the Deep (Original Italian title: I sette dell'Orsa maggiore 'The Seven Men of Great Bear') is 1953 Italian film based on the events of the Raid on Alexandria in 1941 by frogmen of the Decima Flottiglia MAS human torpedoes. It was released in the United Kingdom as Human Torpedoes and in France and Belgium as Panique à Gibraltar (Panic in Gibraltar). It was directed by Duilio Coletti and produced by Carlo Ponti and Luigi De Laurentiis, with a score by Nino Rota and a screenplay by Giuseppe Berto and Marcantonio Bragadin

== Plot ==
The events are a little modified and presented in a more favorable way for the Royal Navy. Namely, the damaging of HMS Valiant is just mentioned in a statement at the end of the movie, the two Italians are evacuated from the room under sea level before the explosion while in reality they had been placed there again after Durand De La Penne had told Morgan about the next explosion, and lastly the news suppression about the ships' damage is presented as much more effective than it was (actually after only a few days the Italian command was informed about the result of the operation).

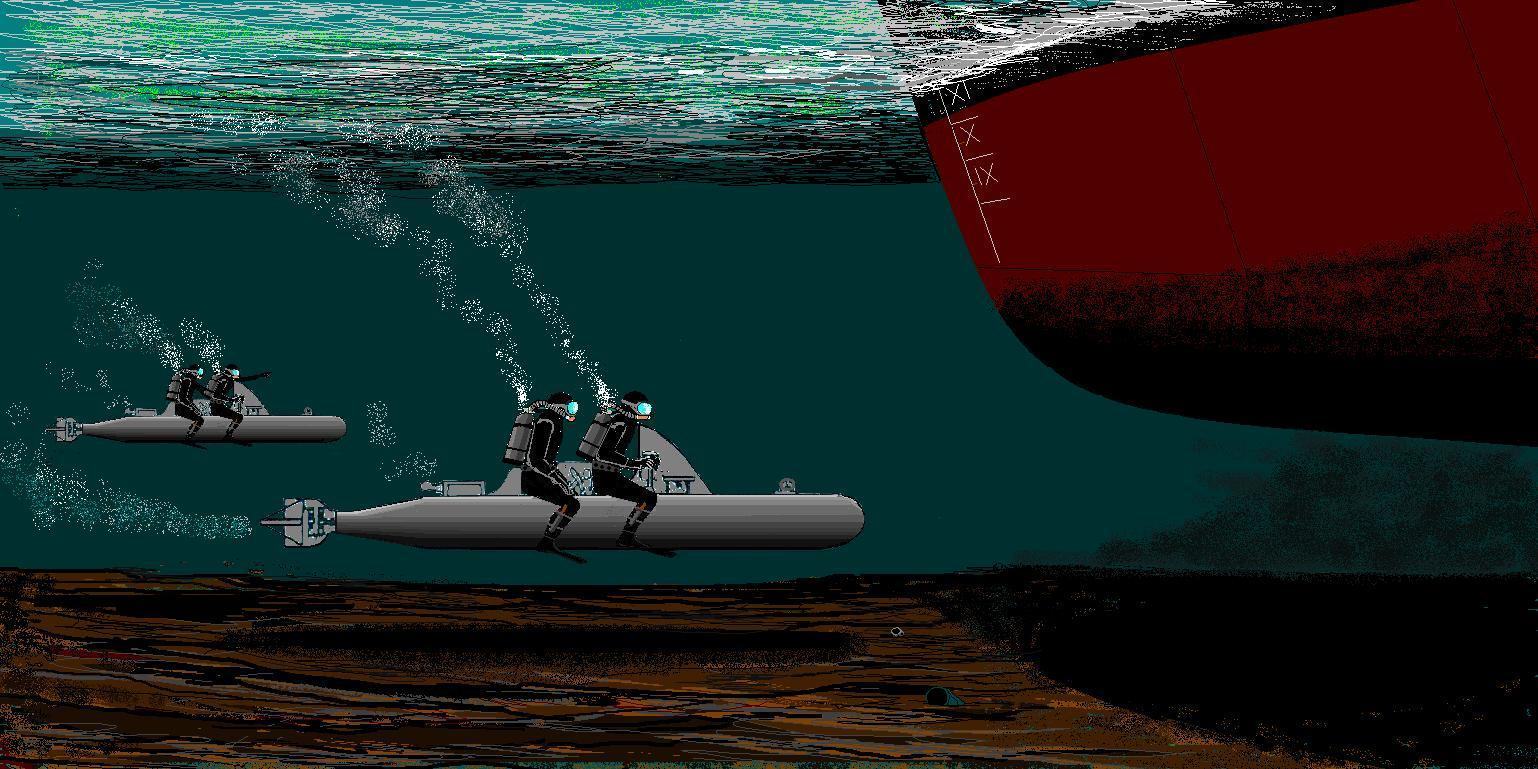
Maiale human torpedo submarine

== Cast ==
The film included some real members of Decima Flottiglia MAS as support actors in the cast, including Luigi Ferraro, the inspiration for the film Mizar (Sabotaggio in mare). The main cast included Pierre Cressoy, Paolo Panelli and Paul Müller and a debut cameo by Tino Carraro. It was the first film appearance for Eleonora Rossi Drago, Riccardo Garrone and Mimmo Poli and also features Charles Fawcett, one of the few actors to appear in more than one Coletti film.
