= Irène Tunc =

French model and actress (1935–1972)

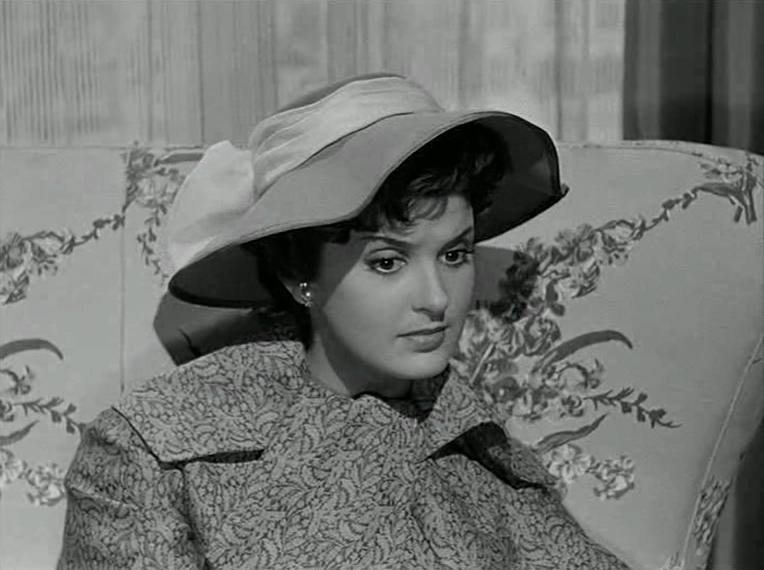
- Tunc in Bravissimo (1955)
- Born: 25 September 1935; Lyon, France
- Died: 16 January 1972 (aged 36); Versailles, France
- Occupations: model, actress
- Years active: 1955-1971

Irène Tunc (25 September 1935 – 16 January 1972) was a French model and actress. She was crowned Miss France in 1954. She was the wife of film director Alain Cavalier and she died in a car crash in 1972. She appeared in 35 films and television shows between 1955 and 1971.

== Filmography ==
| Year | Title | Role | Notes |
|---|---|---|---|
| 1954 | Camilla | Donatella | |
| 1955 | Frou-Frou | | Uncredited |
| 1955 | Sophie and the Crime | La belle-fille | Uncredited |
| 1955 | Bravissimo | Dominique | |
| 1955 | Vous pigez? | Lucia | |
| 1956 | Maid in Paris | | |
| 1956 | If Paris Were Told to Us | La Comtesse de Malazet | |
| 1957 | Les Truands | Une femme de Jim | |
| 1957 | Operazione notte | | |
| 1957 | Le colonel est de la revue | | |
| 1957 | Vacances explosives! | Eva - la cocotte de Jo | |
| 1957 | Lazzarella | Brigitte Clermont | |
| 1957 | La Parisienne | Une maïtresse de Michel Legrand | Uncredited |
| 1958 | Paris Holiday | Shipboard Lovely | Uncredited |
| 1958 | Slave Women of Corinth | Diala | |
| 1958 | La sposa | Flora | |
| 1959 | Cavalier in Devil's Castle | Marchesa Fiamma | |
| 1959 | Noi siamo due evasi | Gisela | |
| 1959 | Magnificent Sinner | Petit rôle | Uncredited |
| 1960 | Genitori in blue-jeans | Clara | |
| 1960 | Le signore | Eva, Fabretti's ex-lover | |
| 1960 | La contessa azzurra | Jeanne d'Argent | |
| 1960 | The Conqueror of the Orient | Fatima | |
| 1960 | Cavalcata selvaggia | | |
| 1961 | Léon Morin, Priest | Christine Sangredin | |
| 1963 | Sweet and Sour | | Uncredited |
| 1966 | The Gardener of Argenteuil | La dame sur le yacht | Uncredited |
| 1967 | The Last Adventure | La secrétaire de Kyobaski | |
| 1967 | Live for Life | Mireille | |
| 1967 | Mise à sac | La standardiste Marie-Ange | |
| 1968 | Je t'aime, je t'aime | Marcelle Hannecart | |
| 1968 | La Chamade | Diane | |
| 1971 | Two English Girls | Ruta | (final film role) |
