= Raffaele Colamonici =

Italian film producer and production manager

- Occupation: Producer
- Years active: 1935–1961

Raffaele Colamonici was an Italian film producer and production manager.

== Selected filmography ==
- Naples in Green and Blue (1935)
- The Last Dance (1941)
- A Husband for the Month of April (1941)
- The Queen of Navarre (1942)
- Totò Le Mokò (1949)
- The Gay Swordsman (1950)
- The Transporter (1950)
- Free Escape (1951)
- Abracadabra (1952)
- Red Love (1952)

== Bibliography ==
- Goble, Alan. The Complete Index to Literary Sources in Film. Walter de Gruyter, 1999.
