= Totò Le Mokò =

- Directed by: Carlo Ludovico Bragaglia
- Written by: Arduino Maiuri; Vittorio Metz; Age & Scarpelli; Sandro Continenza
- Produced by: Raffaele Colamonici
- Starring: Totò; Carlo Ninchi
- Cinematography: Sergio Pesce
- Edited by: Mario Sansoni
- Music by: Edoardo Micucci
- Distributed by: Forum Film
- Release date: 1949
- Running time: 76 minutes
- Country: Italy
- Language: Italian

Totò Le Mokò is a 1949 Italian comedy film. The title alludes to the French film Pépé le Moko.

== Synopsis ==
The mobster Pepé Le Mokò dies during a shootout with the police. His gang decide that his successor will be a relative of his from Naples: Antonio Lumaconi (Totò Le Mokò), a street musician.

== Cast ==
- Totò: Antonio Lumaconi, Totò Le Mokò
- Gianna Maria Canale: Viviane de Valance
- Carlo Ninchi: Pepè le Mokò
- Carla Calò: Suleima
- Elena Altieri: Nancy Cleim
- Marcella Rovena: Sara, the seeker
- Franca Marzi: Odette
- Luigi Pavese: Francois
- Mario Castellani: Za La Mortadelle
- Enzo Garinei: La Tulipe
- Armando Migliari: Claude Cleim
- Gianni Rizzo: guide into the Casbah
