= Vittoria Crispo =

Italian actress (1900–1973)

- Born: 1 May 1900; Naples, Campania, Italy
- Died: 24 December 1973 (aged 73); Naples, Campania, Italy
- Occupation: Actress
- Years active: 1947–1970 (film)

Vittoria Crispo (1 May 1900 – 24 December 1973) was an Italian film and television actress.

== Filmography ==
Year	Title	Role	Notes
1947	Malaspina	Teresina	
1948	Madunnella		
1948	Nennella	Donna Amalia	
1949	La figlia della Madonna	Donna Amalia, madre di Salvatore	
1949	Twenty Years		
1950	Passione fatale		
1951	Cameriera bella presenza offresi...	Annetta, sorella di Raffele	
1951	Filumena Marturano	Portinaia	
1952	Cento piccole mamme		
1952	The City Stands Trial	Neighbour of Ruotolos	
1953	Roman Holiday	Minor Role	Uncredited
1953	Villa Borghese	Minor Role	Uncredited
1953	Bread, Love and Dreams	Madre della Bersagliera	
1953	Passione		
1954	Tarantella napoletana	Troupe Member	
1954	The Doctor of the Mad	Amalia	
1954	Bread, Love and Jealousy	Madre della Bersagliera	
1955	Magic Village	Agatina's mother	
1955	Accadde tra le sbarre	Mariuccia - Rosetta's mother	
1956	Incatenata dal destino		
1956	Toto, Peppino, and the Hussy	Lucia Caponi	
1956	Wives and Obscurities	Signora Bertoni	
1958	Mogli pericolose	Caterina	
1958	Tuppe tuppe, Marescià!	Marianna	
1958	Ricordati di Napoli	Donna Clotilde	
1959	Arriva la banda		
1959	Perfide.... ma belle		
1966	Treasure of San Gennaro	Mamma assunta	
1970	The Priest's Wife		Uncredited, (final film role)

== Bibliography ==
- Ennio Bìspuri. Totò: principe clown : tutti i film di Totò. Guida Editori, 1997.
