= The Sign of Venus =

- Directed by: Dino Risi
- Written by: Edoardo Anton; Luigi Comencini; Franca Valeri; Ennio Flaiano; Dino Risi
- Produced by: Marcello Girosi
- Starring: Franca Valeri; Sophia Loren; Raf Vallone; Vittorio De Sica; Tina Pica; Alberto Sordi; Leopoldo Trieste
- Cinematography: Carlo Montuori
- Music by: Renzo Rossellini
- Release date: 2 March 1955
- Running time: 100 minutes
- Country: Italy
- Language: Italian

The Sign of Venus (Italian: Il segno di Venere) is a 1955 Italian comedy film directed by Dino Risi and starring Sophia Loren. It was entered into the 1955 Cannes Film Festival.

== Plot ==
The story revolves around an attractive woman named Agnese (Loren) who has many suitors. She lives with her cousin Cesira (Franca Valeri), who has the opposite problem with men. Vittorio De Sica plays a poet in need of money and Alberto Sordi plays a man who deals in stolen cars.

== Cast ==
- Franca Valeri as Cesira
- Sophia Loren as Agnese Tirabassi
- Vittorio De Sica as Alessio Spano
- Peppino De Filippo as Mario
- Alberto Sordi as Romolo Proietti
- Raf Vallone as Ignazio Bolognini Vigile del fuoco
- Virgilio Riento as Agnese's father
- Tina Pica as Zia Tina
- Lina Gennari as Signora Pina
- Eloisa Cianni as Daisy
- Leopoldo Trieste as Pittore
- Maurizio Arena as Maurice
- Franco Fantasia as Dottore
- Marcella Rovena as Elvira
- Mario Meniconi as Vigile Urbano
- Furio Meniconi as Proprietario della trattoria
- Anita Durante as Madre di Romolo
