= The Beasts (1971 film) =

1971 film

- Directed by: Giovanni Grimaldi
- Screenplay by: Giovanni Grimaldi; Bruno Corbucci
- Starring: Lando Buzzanca
- Cinematography: Gastone Di Giovanni
- Edited by: Daniele Alabiso
- Music by: Nico Fidenco
- Release date: 1971
- Country: Italy
- Language: Italian

The Beasts (Italian: Le belve) is a 1971 Italian anthology comedy film co-written and directed by Giovanni Grimaldi. It consists of eight segments, all starring Lando Buzzanca.

== Cast ==
- Lando Buzzanca as Journalist / Dario / Raimondo / Husband / Giovanni Apposito / Lanfranco / Surgeon / Francesco Sparapaoli
- Femi Benussi as Concetta Sparapaoli
- Ira von Fürstenberg as Filomena Sparapaoli
- Annabella Incontrera as Carmela Sparapaoli
- Magali Noël as Lisa
- Margaret Lee as Judy
- Françoise Prévost as Clara
- Tino Carraro as Minister
- Claudio Gora as Giulio Bianchi
- Maria Baxa as Wife
- Paola Borboni as Raimondo's Mother-in-law
- Helga Liné as Raimondo's Wife
- Philippe Hersent as Placido
- Nino Terzo as Orazio
- Gina Mascetti as Orazio's Wife
- Renato Malavasi as Priest
- Carla Mancini as "Piccolina" Sparapaoli
- Fulvio Mingozzi as Giuseppe
- Empedocle Buzzanca as Giovanni's Father
- Alfredo Rizzo as Giovanni's Uncle
- Carletto Sposito as Giovanni's Brother
- Giovanni Nuvoletti as Praetor
- Mario Maranzana as Lawyer Maranzana
- Franco Ressel as Prosecutor
- Pietro Tordi as Sparapaoli's Lawyer

== Production ==
The film was produced by Princeps, Italian International Film and Medusa. Its working title was Le belve – io corrompo, tu corrompi, egli corrompe ('The beasts - I corrupt, you corrupt, he corrupts'). Initially, Edwige Fenech was announced to be part of the cast. The film was shot in Rome, except for a scene shot in Monte Gelato.

== Release ==
The film was distributed in Italian cinemas starting from 12 March 1971.

== Reception ==
The film grossed over 710 million lire at the Italian box office. Corriere della Sera described it as a "squalid" film "marked by triviality and profanity". Similarly, Paolo Mereghetti described the film as "a hypocritical pretext for combining turpitude and vulgarity".
