= Perdonami! =

1953 film by Mario Costa

- Directed by: Mario Costa
- Screenplay by: Mario Costa; Alessandro De Stefani; Anton Giulio Majano; Mario Monicelli
- Story by: Giuseppe Valentini; Mario Costa
- Produced by: Rizzoli Film
- Starring: Raf Vallone; Antonella Lualdi
- Cinematography: Mario Bava
- Music by: Carlo Rustichelli
- Distributed by: Variety Distribution
- Release date: 18 February 1953
- Language: Italian

Perdonami! (i. e. "Forgive me!") is a 1953 Italian melodrama film written and directed by Mario Costa and starring Raf Vallone and Antonella Lualdi.

== Cast ==
- Raf Vallone as Marco Gerace
- Antonella Lualdi as Anna Boetto
- Tamara Lees as Vera
- Aldo Bufi Landi as Nicola Boetto
- Patrizia Remiddi as Carletta
- Augusto Pennella as Luigino
- Dante Maggio as Michele
- Emma Baron as Maria Boetto
- Celeste Almieri as Miss Parodi
- Zoe Incrocci as Adele
- Carlo D'Angelo as Commissioner
- Attilio Dottesio as Brigadiere
- Alessandro Fersen as Raul
- Rino Genovese as Ernesto
