= Red Moon (1951 film) =

1951 film

- Directed by: Armando Fizzarotti
- Written by: Armando Fizzarotti; Natale Montillo
- Produced by: Natale Montillo
- Starring: Renato Baldini; Maria Frau; Leda Gloria
- Cinematography: Giuseppe Caracciolo
- Edited by: Armando Fizzarotti
- Music by: Franco Langella
- Production company: S.A.P. Film
- Distributed by: S.A.P. Film
- Release date: 23 November 1951
- Running time: 85 minutes
- Country: Italy
- Language: Italian

Red Moon (Italian: Luna rossa) is a 1951 Italian melodrama film directed by Armando Fizzarotti and starring Renato Baldini, Maria Frau and Leda Gloria. It takes its title from a popular song.

It was shot on location in Naples.

== Plot ==
Maria is engaged to Carlo, a handsome young man of large means, being the son of a well-known Naples merchant who owns a bar; Maria's brother, Paolo who emigrated to Argentina, is romantically linked to a very attractive young woman, Lucia, the daughter of an unscrupulous woman who manipulates her at will. Carlo meets Lucia and falls in love with her and Lucia's mother convinces her daughter to trick him to get money and gifts and both decide to keep it hidden from Carlo that Lucia is betrothed to the brother of her girlfriend. Maria, realizing that Carlo is no longer the same, asks him for explanations and Carlo confesses that he is in love with another woman whose identity, however, he is silent. Distraught Maria returns home and meets her doorkeeper who, having also lost a daughter seduced and abandoned by an unscrupulous man, decides to avenge Mary on her. Meanwhile, a stuttering man but good at singing wrote a letter to Paolo, about to return from Argentina, where he informs him of Lucia's betrayal; the man, however, regrets having written the letter and goes to the porter to be helped to repair the harm done. Meanwhile, Lucia, instructed by her mother, makes it clear to Carlo that she is willing to flee with him but before going to the hotel where Lucia is waiting for her, she learns that Maria has attempted suicide for him also because she is now dishonored and waiting for a son. Carlo rushes to Maria's house where he meets the janitor who has left the house just to kill Carlo but when the latter confesses that he is repentant and wants to ask for Mary's forgiveness, he accompanies him to the girl who forgives him. Meanwhile, Paolo has arrived and after reading the letter he meets Carlo at his home while he reconciles with his sister. The two have a clarification and Carlo tells him that Lucia never told him she was her girlfriend and that she was actually ready to run away with him. Paolo forces Carlo to reveal the meeting place and rushing to the hotel he finds Lucia and kills her blinded by her jealousy. The last shot shows the red moon which, as he himself said when getting off the ship, is a harbinger of bad luck and tragedy.

== Cast ==
- Renato Baldini as Paolo Cassino
- Maria Frau as Maria Cassino
- Aldo Landi as Carlo Sorrentino
- Barbara Florian as Lucia Capuano
- Ugo D'Alessio as Gesualdo
- Franco Gargìa as The Scrivener
- Leda Gloria as Donna Amalia
- Diana Lante as The Hotel Owner
- Beniamino Maggio as Beniamino
- Gina Mascetti as Clementina
- Natale Montillo as Cavalier Sorrentino
- Emilio Petacci as The Baron
- Isa Querio as Donna

== Bibliography ==
- Marlow-Mann, Alex. The New Neapolitan Cinema. Edinburgh University Press, 2011.
