= Armando Gill =

Italian singer-songwriter and actor (1877–1945)

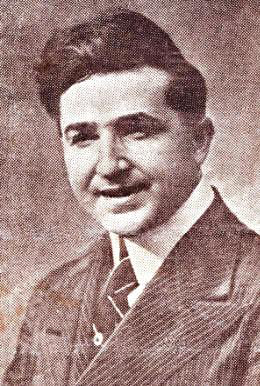
- Born: Michele Testa; 23 July 1877; Naples, Italy
- Died: 1 January 1945 (aged 67); Naples, Italy

Michele Testa (23 July 1877 – 1 January 1945), best known as Armando Gill, was an Italian singer, songwriter, actor, playwright and poet.

Born in Naples, the son of a small distillery's owner, Testa was the third of six children. After the death of his mother, he was put in a boarding school where he started showing his artistic skills in composing brief poems.

Moved to Rome to study Law, starting from 1896 Testa approached the show biz, performing as a singer and an improvising poet. In 1898, he composed and recorded his first song, "Fenesta 'nchiusa". Shortly later, to not embarrass his bourgeois family, Testa adopted his stage name. He then left the university and devoted himself to the music hall, signing a contract with the Salone Margherita in Rome as an actor, singer, playwright and songwriter.

In 1910, Gill got his first hit with the song "Bel suldatin", followed by other successes including ″'O zampugnaro nnammurato″, ″Nun so' geluso″ and ″Varca d'ammore″. At the outbreak of war, he was conscripted and then reported missing as the ship on which he was traveling was reported sunk. Returned to Italy, he joked about the news with the revue Gill l'affondato (i.e. "The sunken Gill").

In 1918, Gill got his major success with the song "Come pioveva", which immediately became an instant classic in Italy. He maintained a large popularity through the 1920s, and was eventually active until 1943.
