= Duilio Coletti =

Italian film director (1906–1999)

- Born: 28 December 1906; Penne, Italy
- Died: 22 May 1999 (aged 92); Rome, Italy
- Occupations: Film director, screenwriter
- Years active: 1934–1994

Duilio Coletti (28 December 1906 – 22 May 1999) was an Italian film director and screenwriter. He directed 29 films between 1934 and 1977.

== Career ==
Born in Penne, Abruzzo, he took a degree in medicine and surgery and practiced the profession for a short time. He entered the film industry as a screenwriter and assistant director in early 1930s, then made his directorial debut in 1935 with Pierpin. Coletti specialized in films of great spectacular impact and was particularly appreciated in the direction of action movies.

His film Submarine Attack was entered into the 4th Berlin International Film Festival. He was a member of the jury at the 8th Berlin International Film Festival.

== Selected filmography ==
- The Fornaretto of Venice (1939)
- Captain Fracasse (1940)
- The Mask of Cesare Borgia (1941)
- The Adulteress (1946)
- Bullet for Stefano (1947)
- Heart (Cuore) (1948)
- The Earth Cries Out (Il grido della terra) (1948)
- The Wolf of the Sila (1949)
- Romanzo d'amore (1950)
- Free Escape (1951)
- The Shameless Sex (1952)
- The Piano Tuner Has Arrived (1952)
- Hell Raiders of the Deep (I sette dell'orsa maggiore), a.k.a. Human Torpedoes (1952)
- Submarine Attack (1954)
- Folgore Division (Divisione Folgore) (1954)
- Bella non piangere! (1955)
- The House of Intrigue (Londra chiama Polo Nord), a.k.a. London Calling North Pole (1956)
- The Italians They Are Crazy (Gli italiani sono matti) (1958)
- Under Ten Flags (1960)
- Black City (Il re di Poggioreale) (1961)
- Anzio (1968)
