= Otello Colangeli =

Italian film editor

- Born: 20 December 1912; Rome, Lazio, Kingdom of Italy
- Died: 6 January 1998 (aged 85); Rome, Lazio, Italy
- Occupation: Editor
- Years active: 1938–1991

Otello Colangeli (20 December 1912 – 6 January 1998) was an Italian film editor. He worked on over two hundred productions during his career.

== Selected filmography ==
- Television (1931)
- Guest for One Night (1939)
- The Hussar Captain (1940)
- Yellow Hell (1942)
- Once a Week (1942)
- Mist on the Sea (1944)
- Black Eagle (1946)
- Pagliacci (1948)
- Heaven over the Marshes (1949)
- Summer Storm (1949)
- The Emperor of Capri (1949)
- Song of Spring (1951)
- Frontier Wolf (1952)
- Article 519, Penal Code (1952)
- Guilt Is Not Mine (1952)
- What Price Innocence? (1952)
- Past Lovers (1953)
- My Life Is Yours (1953)
- Condemned to Hang (1953)
- Carmen (1953)
- For You I Have Sinned (1953)
- Naples Is Always Naples (1954)
- The Lovers of Manon Lescaut (1954)
- Amici per la pelle (1955)
- The Song of the Heart (1955)
- Wives and Obscurities (1956)
- The Angel of the Alps (1957)
- The Invincible Gladiator (1961)
- Mole Men Against the Son of Hercules (1961)
- The Mongols (1961)
- Vulcan, Son of Giove (1962)
- Devil of the Desert Against the Son of Hercules (1964)
- Counselor at Crime (1973)
- Sinbad and the Caliph of Baghdad (1973)
- House of 1000 Pleasures (1973)
- The Two Orphans (1976)
- The Perfect Killer (1977)

== Bibliography ==
- Roberto Curti. Italian Crime Filmography, 1968-1980. McFarland, 2013.
