= La pagella =

- Directed by: Ninì Grassia
- Written by: Sergio Garrone
- Cinematography: Luigi Ciccarese
- Music by: Tony Iglio
- Release date: 1980
- Country: Italy
- Language: Italian
- Box office: ₤1.800 billion

La pagella (Italian for "The report card") is a 1980 Italian sceneggiata film directed by Ninì Grassia. It is based on the 1977 sceneggiata 'A paggella. The film was a commercial success, grossing about one billion eight hundred million lire at the Italian box office.

== Cast ==
- Mario Trevi: Salvatore Fontana
- Marc Porel: Police Commissioner Vincenzo Saliani
- Massimo Deda: Gennarino Fontana
- Rosalia Maggio: Pascarella
- Marisa Laurito: Assunta Fontana
- Marzio Honorato: Riccio
- Beniamino Maggio: Antonio
