= Aldo Bufi Landi =

Italian actor

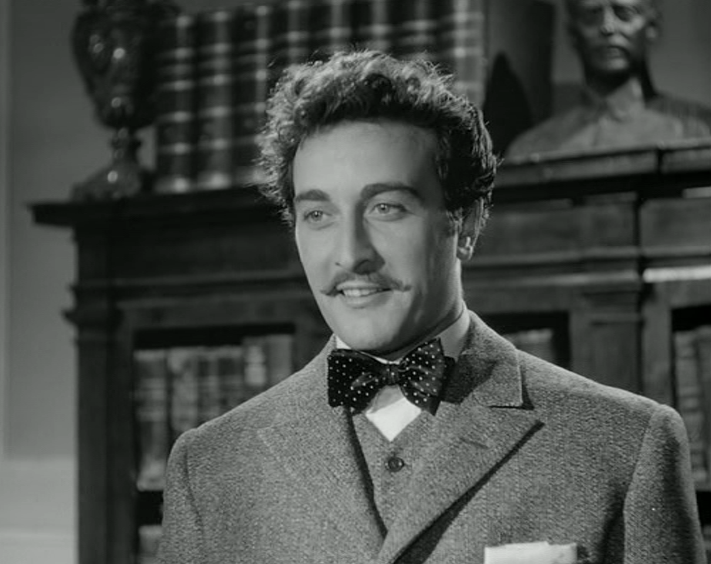
- Aldo Bufi Landi 1952
- Born: 7 April 1923; Naples, Italy
- Died: 2 February 2016 (aged 92)
- Occupation: Actor
- Years active: 1947-2016
- Spouse: Clara Bindi

Aldo Bufi Landi (7 April 1923 – 2 February 2016) was an Italian film actor. He appeared in more than 100 films between 1947 and 2013.

== Selected filmography ==
- Malaspina (1947)
- Madunnella (1948)
- Assunta Spina (1948)
- Little Lady (1949)
- 47 morto che parla (1950)
- Red Moon (1951)
- The Steamship Owner (1951)
- Perdonami! (1953)
- Submarine Attack (1954)
- Il Conte di Matera (1957)
- Tuppe tuppe, Marescià! (1958)
- Cavalier in Devil's Castle (1959)
- Those Two in the Legion (1962)
- Desert Raiders (1964)
- Kidnapped to Mystery Island (1964)
- Sandokan Against the Leopard of Sarawak (1964)
- Secret Agent 777 (1965)
- Agent X-77 Orders to Kill (1966)
- Superargo and the Faceless Giants (1968)
- The Million Dollar Countdown (1968)
- Midas Run (1969)
- Byleth: The Demon of Incest (1972)
- Sgarro alla camorra (1973)
- Super Stooges vs. the Wonder Women (1974)
- The Perfect Killer (1977)
- The Unlikely Prince (2013)
