= Armando Fizzarotti =

- Born: 16 February 1892; Naples, Italy
- Died: 15 February 1966 (aged 73); Naples, Italy
- Occupations: Director; Screenwriter
- Years active: 1923–1957

Armando Fizzarotti (16 February 1892 – 15 February 1966) was an Italian screenwriter and film director. Fizzarotti was a native of Naples, and his films are generally set in the city. He was specifically hired to direct Malaspina (1947) because of his experience making Neapolitan-style films. The film helped revive Neapolitan cinema, which had been suppressed during the Fascist era as production was centralised in Rome.

His son Ettore Maria Fizzarotti was also a film director.

== Selected filmography ==
=== Director ===
- New Moon (1925)
- Naples in Green and Blue (1935)
- Malaspina (1947)
- Red Moon (1951)
- Naples Is Always Naples (1954)

=== Screenwriter ===
- The Lovers of Ravello (1951)

== Bibliography ==
- Marlow-Mann, Alex. The New Neapolitan Cinema. Edinburgh University Press, 2011.
