= The Two Orphans =

The Two Orphans may refer to:

- The Two Orphans (play), a French play of 1874 by Adolphe d'Ennery and Eugène Cormon
- The Two Orphans (1915 film), a lost film starring Theda Bara
- The Two Orphans (1933 film), a French film directed by Maurice Tourneur
- The Two Orphans (1942 film), an Italian film directed by Carmine Gallone
- The Two Orphans (1944 film), a Mexican film directed by José Benavides
- The Two Orphans (1947 film), an Italian film directed by Mario Mattoli
- The Two Orphans (1949 film), an Egyptian film directed by Hassan Al Imam
- The Two Orphans (1950 film), a Mexican film directed by Roberto Rodríguez
- The Two Orphans (1954 film) (Le due orfanelle), a French-Italian film directed by Giacomo Gentilomo
- The Two Orphans (1965 film), a French-Italian film directed by Riccardo Freda
- The Two Orphans (1976 film), an Italian-Spanish film directed by Leopoldo Savona
