= The Two Orphans (1942 film) =

1942 film directed by Carmine Gallone

- Directed by: Carmine Gallone
- Written by: Guido Cantini
- Based on: The Two Orphans by Adolphe d'Ennery Eugène Cormon
- Produced by: Federico Curioni; Carmine Gallone
- Starring: Alida Valli; María Denis; Osvaldo Valenti; Roberto Villa
- Cinematography: Anchise Brizzi
- Edited by: Niccolò Lazzari
- Music by: Renzo Rossellini
- Production company: Grandi Film
- Distributed by: Industrie Cinematografiche Italiane
- Release date: 16 August 1942
- Running time: 85 minutes
- Country: Italy
- Language: Italian

The Two Orphans (Italian: Le due orfanelle) is a 1942 Italian historical drama film directed by Carmine Gallone and starring Alida Valli, María Denis and Osvaldo Valenti. It was based on the play The Two Orphans by Adolphe d'Ennery and Eugène Cormon, one of many film adaptations. It was made at Cinecittà Studios in Rome. The film's sets were designed by the art director Guido Fiorini.

== Cast ==
- Alida Valli as Enrichetta
- María Denis as Luisa
- Osvaldo Valenti as Pietro
- Roberto Villa as Ruggero de Vaudray
- Otello Toso as Giacomo
- Gilda Marchiò as Madame Frochard
- Germana Paolieri as Marianna
- Memo Benassi as Il conte di Linières
- Tina Lattanzi as La contessa Diana di Linières
- Enrico Glori as Il marchese di Presle
- Guido Celano as Monsieur Gérard
- Pio Campa as Marais
- Adele Garavaglia as Suor Genoveffa
- Umberto Spadaro as Il custode della stazione
- Giuseppe Varni as Picard, il cameriere
- Ruggero Capodaglio
- Marisa Dianora
- Edvige Elisabeth
- Giulio Panicali
- Luigi Pavese
- Aldo Silvani
- Edda Soligo
- Aris Valeri

== See also ==
- The Two Orphans (1915)
- Orphans of the Storm (1921)
- The Two Orphans (1933)
- The Two Orphans (1954)
- The Two Orphans (1965)
- The Two Orphans (1976)

== Bibliography ==
- Nowell-Smith, Geoffrey & Hay, James & Volpi, Gianni. The Companion to Italian Cinema. Cassell, 1996.
