= The Two Orphans (1954 film) =

- Film poster
- Directed by: Giacomo Gentilomo
- Written by: Adolphe d'Ennery (play); Eugène Cormon (play); Yves Mirande; Filippo Sanjust
- Produced by: Robert Chabert; Angelo Rizzoli
- Starring: Myriam Bru; Milly Vitale; André Luguet
- Cinematography: Anchise Brizzi
- Edited by: Elsa Dubbini
- Music by: Nino Rota
- Production companies: Rizzoli Film; Francinex
- Release dates: 16 December 1954 (Italy); 13 July 1955 (France)
- Running time: 95 minutes
- Countries: Italy; France
- Languages: Italian; French

The Two Orphans (Italian: Le due orfanelle) is a 1954 French-Italian historical melodrama film directed by Giacomo Gentilomo and starring Myriam Bru, Milly Vitale and André Luguet. It is based on the 1874 play The Two Orphans by Adolphe d'Ennery and Eugène Cormon, one of a large number of film adaptations. It was shot in eastmancolor, with sets designed by the art director Virgilio Marchi.

== Cast ==
- Myriam Bru as Henriette Gérard
- Milly Vitale as Louise
- André Luguet as Count de Linières
- Franco Interlenghi as Knight Roger de Vaudrey
- Jacques Castelot as Marquis de Presles
- Gabrielle Dorziat as La Frochard
- Andrea Checchi as Captain Marrest
- Adriana Benetti as Thérèse, the mother
- Mirko Ellis as Jacques Frochard
- Bianca Maria Fusari as Marianne Vauthier
- Giuseppe Porelli as The duke at the party
- Paolo Poli as Pierre Frochard
- Sandro Ruffini as Doctor Martin
- Alessandro Fersen as Michel Gérard - the father
- Miranda Campa as The Mother Superior
- Carlo Duse
- Nadia Gray as Diane de Vaudrey - countess de Linières
- Charles Fawcett
- Ileana Lauro
- Franco Fantasia as Roger de Vaudrey's Friend
- Hedda Linton
- Andreina Zani
- Sue Ellen Blake as Prostitute in jail
- Alberto Farnese

== See also ==
- The Two Orphans (1915)
- Orphans of the Storm (1921)
- The Two Orphans (1933)
- The Two Orphans (1942)
- The Two Orphans (1965)
- The Two Orphans (1976)

== Bibliography ==
- Klossner, Michael. The Europe of 1500-1815 on Film and Television. McFarland, 2002.
