= The Two Orphans (1933 film) =

1933 film directed by Maurice Tourneur

- Directed by: Maurice Tourneur
- Written by: Adolphe d'Ennery (play); Eugène Cormon (play); René Pujol; Maurice Tourneur
- Starring: Rosine Deréan; Renée Saint-Cyr; Gabriel Gabrio
- Cinematography: Georges Benoît; Roger Lucas
- Edited by: Harold Earle
- Music by: Marcel Delannoy; Jacques Ibert
- Production company: Pathé-Natan
- Distributed by: Pathé-Natan
- Release date: 10 March 1933
- Running time: 102 minutes
- Country: France
- Language: French

The Two Orphans (French: Les deux orphelines) is a 1933 French historical drama film directed by Maurice Tourneur and starring Rosine Deréan, Renée Saint-Cyr and Gabriel Gabrio. The film's sets were designed by the art director Lucien Aguettand. The film was based on the play The Two Orphans which had been turned into several films. Tourneur altered the story slightly by moving it forward from the French Revolution to the Napoleonic Era.

== Cast ==
- Rosine Deréan as Louise
- Renée Saint-Cyr as Henriette
- Gabriel Gabrio as Jacques
- Pierre Magnier as Le comte de Lignères
- Jean Martinelli as Roger de Vaudray
- Yvette Guilbert as La Frochard
- Marthe Mellot as La religieuse
- Emile Saulieu as Le marquis de Presles
- Jean Francey as Pierre
- Camille Bert as Le docteur
- Georges Morton as Lafleur
- André Liabel as Marest
- Pierre Ferval as L'aubergiste
- Anthony Gildès as Le vieux seigneur
- Armand Morins as Le satyre
- Georges Benoît
- Clairjane
- Emmy Lynn as La comtesse de Lignères
- Wanda Warel
- Jean-François Martial as Un ravisseur

== See also ==
- The Two Orphans (1915)
- Orphans of the Storm (1921)
- The Two Orphans (1942)
- The Two Orphans (1954)
- The Two Orphans (1965)
- The Two Orphans (1976)

== Bibliography ==
- Waldman, Harry. Maurice Tourneur: The Life and Films. McFarland, 2001.
