= The Two Orphans (1965 film) =

- Directed by: Riccardo Freda
- Screenplay by: Riccardo Freda; Michel Wichard
- Based on: Les deux ophelines by Adolphe d'Ennery
- Produced by: Robert de Nesle
- Starring: Mike Marshall; Valeria Ciangottini; Sophie Darès
- Cinematography: Jean Tournier
- Edited by: Jean-Marie Gimel; Patrick Clément-Bayard
- Music by: René Sylviano
- Production companies: Comptoir Français du Film Production; Roal Films; Cine Italia Film
- Distributed by: CFF
- Release date: 24 May 1965 (France)
- Running time: 97 minutes
- Countries: France; Italy

The Two Orphans (French: Les Deux orphelines) is a 1965 historical drama film directed by Riccardo Freda and starring Sophie Darès, Valeria Ciangottini, Mike Marshall. It is based on the play Les deux ophelines by Adolphe d'Ennery.

== Cast ==
- Sophie Darès - Henriette Gérard
- Valeria Ciangottini - Louise
- Mike Marshall - Roger de Vaudray
- Jacques Castelot - Le marquis de Presle
- Jean Desailly - Le comte de Linières
- Alice Sapritch - La Frochard
- Simone Valère - La comtesse de Linières
- Jean Carmet - Picard
- Roger Fradet - LaFleur
- Michel Barbey - Jacques Frochard
- Marie-France Mignal - Marianne
- Gabrielle Doulcet - Marion
- Denis Manuel - Pierre Frochard
- André Falcon - Docteur Hébert

== Release ==
The Two Orphans was released in France on May 25, 1965 where it was distributed by CFF.

== See also ==
- The Two Orphans (1915)
- Orphans of the Storm (1921)
- The Two Orphans (1933)
- The Two Orphans (1942)
- The Two Orphans (1954)
- The Two Orphans (1976)
