= Brooklyn Theatre fire =

1876 fire in Brooklyn, New York

Coordinates: 40°41′41″N 73°59′23″W

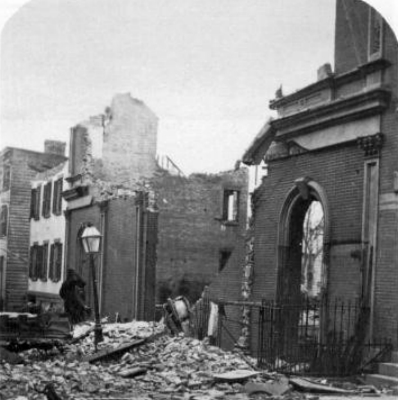
- Brooklyn Theatre from Johnson Street, shortly after December 5, 1876, fire
- Date: December 5, 1876
- Time: About 11:20 PM local time
- Location: the site of what is now 271 Cadman Plaza Brooklyn, New York 11201 United States
- Casualties: 278–300+ (estimated range)

The Brooklyn Theatre fire was a catastrophic building fire that broke out on the evening of December 5, 1876, in the city of Brooklyn, New York (now a borough of New York City). The fire took place at the Brooklyn Theatre, near the corner of Washington and Johnson streets, with over 1,000 guests in attendance. The conflagration killed at least 278 people, with some accounts reporting more than 300 dead. 103 unidentified victims were interred in a common grave at Green-Wood Cemetery, marked by an obelisk, while more than two dozen identified victims were interred individually in separate sections at the Cemetery of the Evergreens in Brooklyn.

The Brooklyn Theatre fire ranks third in fatalities among fires occurring in theatres and other public assembly buildings in the United States, behind only the 1942 Cocoanut Grove fire and the 1903 Iroquois Theatre fire.

Most deaths occurred in the family circle, the uppermost level of the theatre where the cheapest seats were located. This gallery was quickly exposed to intense heat and thick, suffocating smoke. With only a single stairway for exit, congestion blocked escape, trapping more than half of those inside.

== Brooklyn Theatre ==
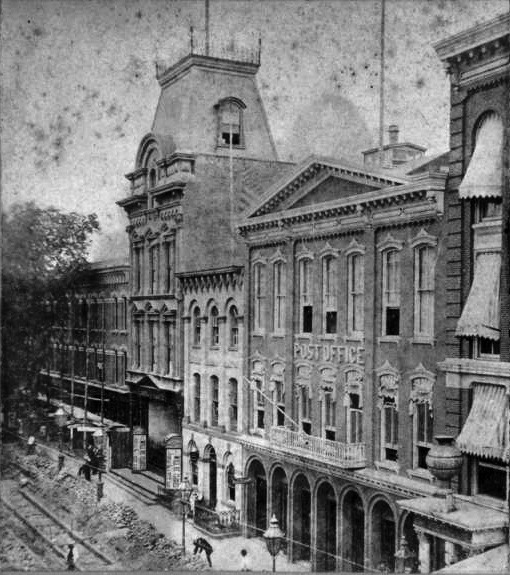
Washington Street entrance before the fire, looking north toward Johnson Street. The theatre is distinguished by its mansard roof; its L-shaped lot wrapped around the Dieter Hotel, here partially obscured by trees.

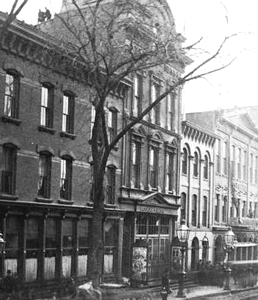
The Washington Street entrance shortly after the fire. A crowd has congregated in front of the First Precinct station house, one door south, possibly to inquire after missing people or to file reports

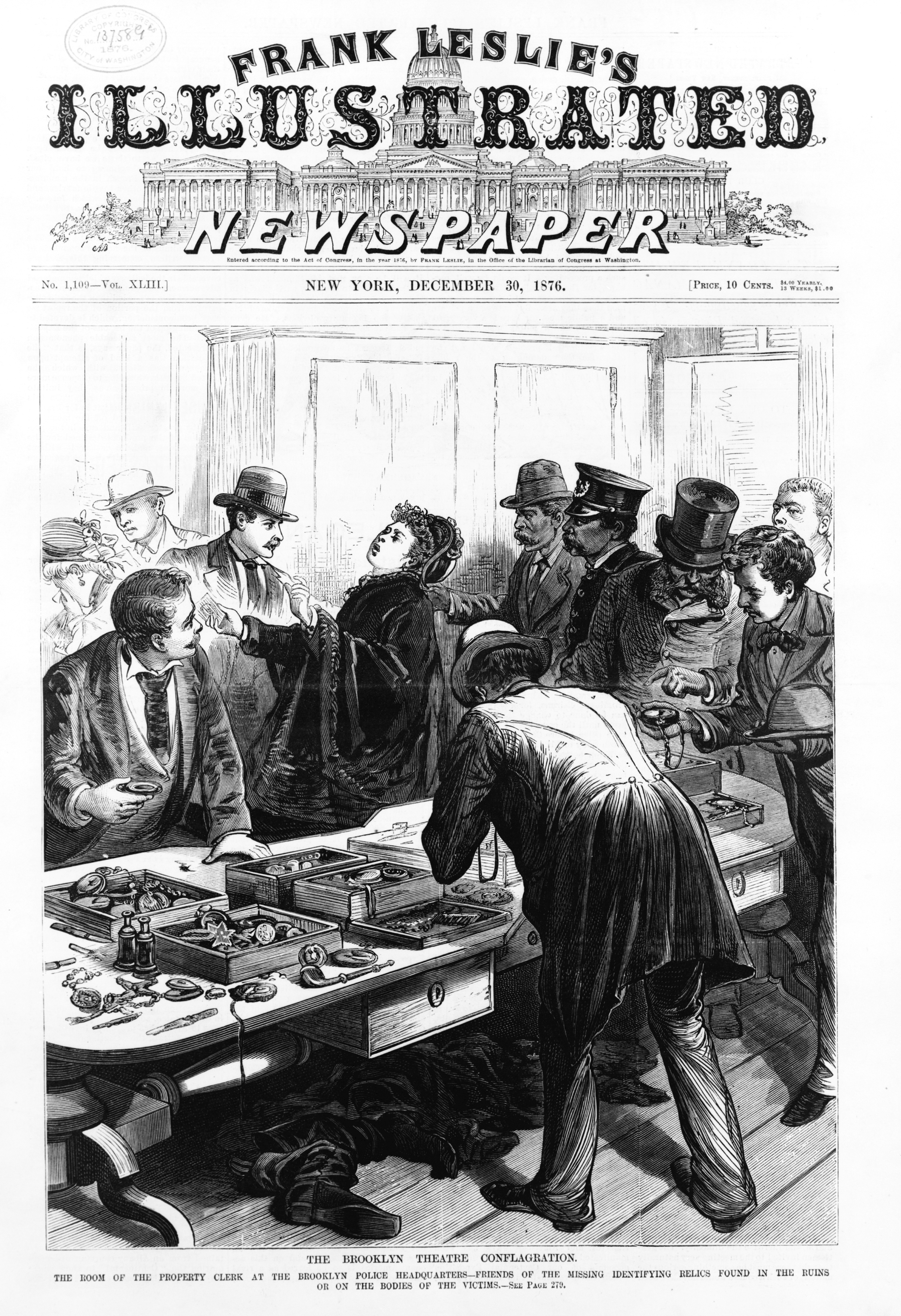
Relics of victims laid out for identification at Brooklyn Police Headquarters

The Brooklyn Theatre opened on October 2, 1871, and stood near the southeast corner of Washington and Johnson streets, one block north of Brooklyn's City Hall. It was owned by The Brooklyn Building Association, a partnership of affluent Brooklyn residents including Abner C. Keeney, William Kingsley, and Judge Alexander McCue. After its destruction, the Brooklyn Daily Eagle called it Brooklyn's "principal theatre". The theatre had been managed by Sara and Frederick B. Conway until the last 20 months of its existence; the Conways were long involved in New York and Brooklyn theatre, having managed Brooklyn's Park Theatre from 1864 to 1871. Sara Conway died in April 1875, about six months after her husband. Their children Minnie, Lillian, and Frederick Jr. then managed the Brooklyn Theatre for a short time, but without success. Albert Marshman Palmer and Sheridan Shook were the manager and proprietor of New York's Union Square Theatre, and they assumed a new lease on the Brooklyn Theatre later in 1875, managing it until the catastrophe took place.

The Brooklyn Theatre stood a block from Fulton Street, the main thoroughfare to the Manhattan ferries and readily accessible to both New York and Brooklyn residents. Its seating capacity was about 1,600. Both Conway and Shook & Palmer sought upscale productions with well-known actors and actresses. The Brooklyn Theatre became a well-respected house in Brooklyn's nascent theatre district, which included the smaller and older Park, Olympic, and Globe theatres.

=== The Two Orphans ===
Shook and Palmer were already enjoying success with their Union Square Theatre Company in New York and went on to transplant a number of their productions to the Brooklyn house. Their specialty was the adaptation of French plays to the American stage. The Two Orphans was a melodrama about two young homeless orphans separated by abduction; it featured Kate Claxton and was presented on the night of the fire. It had been a particularly successful play, running for 180 performances in 1874 at the Union Square Theatre. It was originally Les Deux Orphelines by Adolphe d'Ennery and Eugène Cormon, and had been adapted to the American stage by N. Hart Jackson. Shook and Palmer brought it to the Brooklyn Theatre in March 1876 after an American tour, including one performance at the Brooklyn Theatre on April 12, 1875, two weeks before Sara Conway's death.

The 1876 run at the Brooklyn Theatre was well received but was ending. At the time of the fire, Palmer indicated that a number of Union Square Theatre productions had been scheduled for the Brooklyn Theatre and that all the scenery and properties for Ferrsol, Rose Michel, Conscience, and Colonel Sellers had been stored on the premises, along with the wardrobe for The Two Orphans and a suite of furniture for Rose Michel.

=== Building features ===
The Brooklyn Theatre was designed by Thomas R. Jackson and constructed in 1871 according to Sara Conway's specifications. Brooklyn Police Fire Marshal Patrick Keady, who gathered testimony and constructed a chronology of the disaster, said that the structure had better exits than many other public buildings in Brooklyn at that time.

The theatre occupied an L-shaped lot, with the Proscenium theatre occupying the 127-by-70-foot (39 m × 21 m) wing fronting Johnson Street. The stage and scene doors opened onto Johnson Street from this wing. The scene doors were 20 ft (6.1 m) wide, large enough to accommodate scenic flats and large props. The stage doors were smaller but could accommodate people carrying heavy loads. These Johnson Street doors were utilitarian and little used by the public. The shorter 27-by-40-foot (8.2 m × 12.2 m) wing on Washington Street housed the main entrance to the lower floors and a separate staircase to the third floor theatre gallery. They were for public use, and Jackson considered these main entry ways to be large enough to discharge a full house of 1,450 people in less than five minutes.

There were three sets of doors which Jackson designated as special exits. They led onto Flood's Alley, a small street running along the east side of the building that bisected the block from Johnson to Myrtle Avenue. Each set was six feet (1.8 m) across. The southern door closest to Myrtle Avenue opened into the eastern end of the lobby, underneath the flight of stairs leading from the lobby to the dress circle. The middle set opened onto a hallway adjoining the parquet, and the northern set opened near the stage and orchestra pit. The middle set served a stairway ascending to the second floor dress circle. These alley doors were normally locked to discourage gate-crashing. The structure had no fire escapes in the modern sense; i.e., those that connect higher storey windows to the street. Sources from the period often called these alley doors "fire escapes", but designs of the era were untested and tended to be impractical.

==== Seating, interior passages, and spaces ====
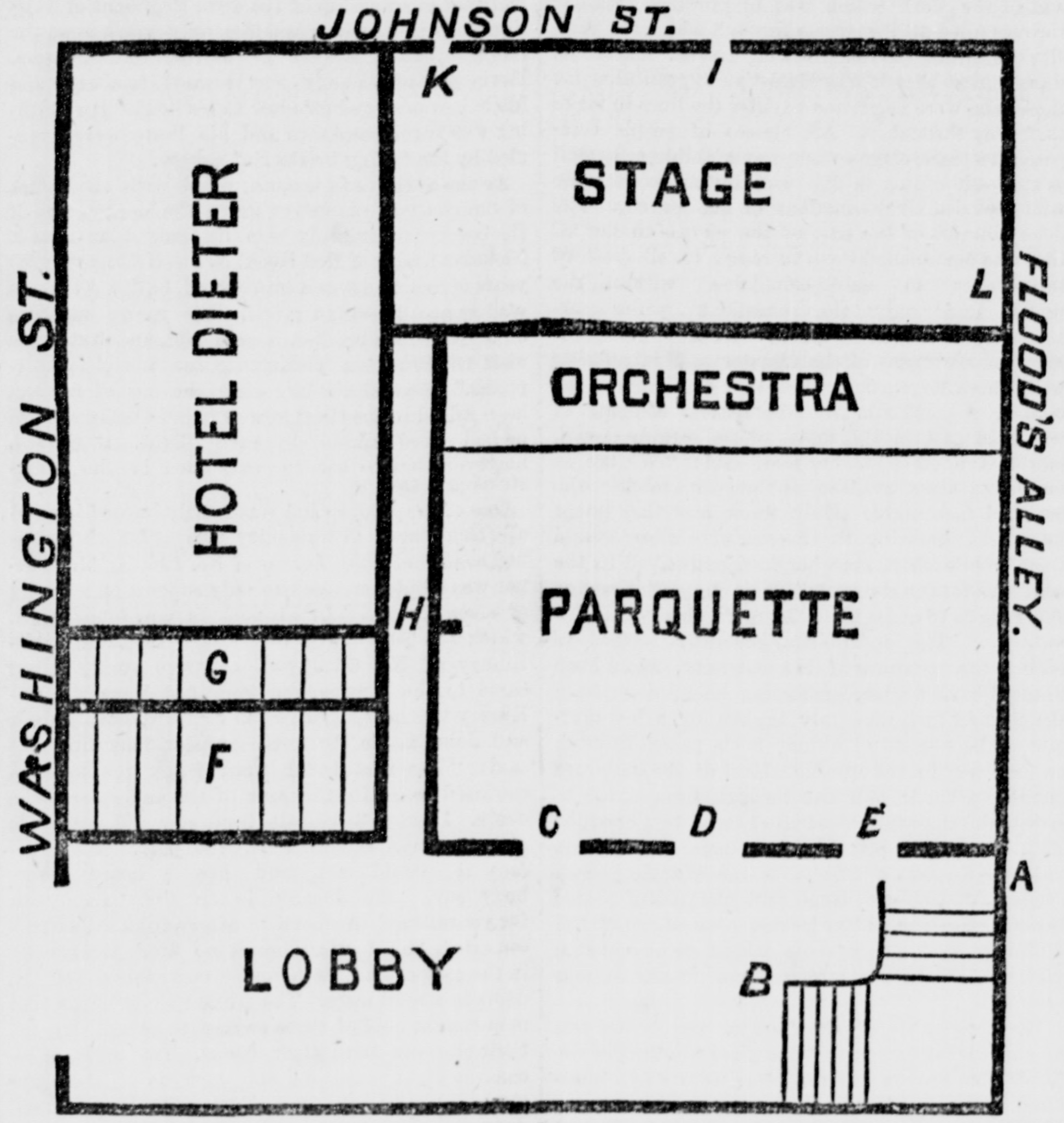
Brooklyn Theatre Floor Plan 1. Published in the New-York Tribune December 7, 1876. A. Flood's Alley entrance opened by Thomas Rocheford, furnishing patrons an extra avenue of escape. B. Stairway to dress circle gallery on the second floor. Police, firemen and theatre employees succeeded in breaking the crush on this stairway. C, D, E. Doors leading to ground floor seating. F. Separate street stairway to third floor family circle gallery. See Floor Plan Two. G. Private stairway to 2nd and 3rd floor apartments and offices. H. Private passage from stage to the lobby box office. Used by Kate Claxton and others to escape the stage. I, K. Utility entrances onto Johnson Street. L. Emergency exit onto Flood's Alley.

The Brooklyn Theatre had three levels of seating. Parquet and parquet circle seating occupied the theatre's ground floor and contained 600 seats. The dress circle occupied a second floor balcony which seated 550. A third floor gallery, the family circle, extended to the south wall of the structure and seated 450. The family circle had its own entrance and ticket booth and customers seated there did not usually commingle with patrons purchasing seating for the lower floors.

Furthest from the stage and up against the theatre ceiling, the family circle offered the cheapest accommodations and had the most roundabout access to the street. The passageway started from the gallery, passed through a curtain partition, then descended southward down a short flight of stairs to a platform set against the south wall. It turned right (west) and descended another flight of stairs anchored to the south wall, ending at a second floor corridor. Patrons then made a right turn into this corridor and followed the passageway northward along the west wall to the family circle box office. The passage then turned left, westward again, and descended a third flight of stairs down to a short, street-level hallway that led onto Washington Street (see Floor Plan 2).

Access to the dress circle was more straightforward. Patrons entered and left the dress circle via a flight of 10-foot-wide (3.0 m) stairs that descended south to a landing, then turned right onto a second flight that opened into the lobby. Patrons in the dress circle also had a second emergency exit along the alley side of the building, going down a flight of stairs to the middle exit onto Flood's Alley. The exit was generally locked to thwart gate-crashers so the stairs were little used and not well known.

Eight private boxes, four on each side of the stage and each accommodating six people, rounded out the seating, the box seats furnishing the most elegant and expensive accommodations in the house. At the time the theatre opened in 1871, seating in the family circle cost fifty cents and the dress circle cost a dollar. In the lower auditorium, parquet seating, inconveniently close to the stage, cost seventy five cents while the parquet circle cost a dollar fifty. The box seats cost ten dollars.

==== Stage and flies ====
As with many 19th-century theatres, the Brooklyn Theatre's stage was a presentation platform, a prop factory and a warehouse. At the back of the stage was the painter's bridge, a walkway which ran the width of the stage and which could be raised or lowered as required for painting backdrops, or drops. These and borders, scenic elements painted on canvas and mounted on wooden frames, were installed in a rigging loft, known as a fly system, a large wooden open frame equipped with the pulleys and tackle needed to raise or lower scenic elements. It was suspended high in the fly space or flies, the volume above the stage never seen by the audience. For a large production with many scene changes, the rigging loft could be heavily loaded with painted canvas. On the night of the fire, it contained drops and borders for The Two Orphans and the scenery for Julius Caesar was stacked on the stage, awaiting pickup. This had bearing on the fire's outset when stage manager Thorpe considered getting the hose but was hampered by scenery.

The proscenium arch housed a 35-by-50-foot (11 m × 15 m) drop curtain. The arch itself was not integral to the theatre but was constructed with a lightweight, plastered curtain wall made of wood. The drama was entirely lit with gaslight controlled at a gas table, where an operator could light a lamp with an electric spark and vary its intensity through regulating gas flow. Arrayed on the side of the proscenium arch were gas-lit border lamps, equipped with tin reflectors that cast light backstage and onto the borders. Each border lamp was in a wire cage intended to keep the canvas borders at least a foot (30 cm) away from the gas lamps within. Personnel were forbidden to ignite gaslights with matches or smoke anywhere on the stage.

== Fire ==
Progress of the fire: 1. A border catches fire from a gaslight border lamp. 2. Actors attempt to calm audience; they fail and panic erupts. 3. Though panic-struck, patrons evacuate the lower portions of the theatre successfully. 4. The balcony suffers from clogged stairwells (orange) filled with panicking, frenzied patrons, but police and firemen restore order in time. 5. Choking, deadly smoke hits the gallery before half the people can evacuate via a single stairway (red), which has also become jammed by too many people trying to exit at once.

On Tuesday evening, December 5, 1876, about a thousand patrons were in attendance. Samuel Hastings, who collected tickets at the gallery entrance, estimated that there were about 400 people in the family circle. One of the theatre owners, Colonel Abner Keeny, said that about 360 people purchased tickets for the dress circle and about 250 people in the parquet and parquet circle. Edward B. Dickinson, a patron in the middle of the parquet about five rows from the stage, thought the auditorium floor was not more than half full. Charles Vine, high in the family circle, thought it was "one of the biggest galleries" he had seen in a long time.

The play proceeded without incident until 11 p.m., the intermission between the fourth and fifth acts. The drop curtain was down, hiding the stage, and the orchestra was playing. Some attendees in the parquet circle heard what sounded like a brawl behind the curtain, shouting and machinery working, noise carrying above the orchestra's playing.

Behind the curtain, actors were taking their positions in a box set depicting an old boathouse on the bank of the Seine. Made of painted canvas on a flimsy wooden frame, the curtain blocked the backstage from view. Kate Claxton, playing Louise the blind orphan girl, along with actors J. B. Studley and H. S. Murdoch, had taken their places on stage and were waiting for the curtain to rise. Claxton was lying on a pallet of straw, looking up. Actors Mary Ann Farren and Claude Burroughs were waiting in the wings.

=== Detection of fire ===
Around 11:20 p.m., while preparations for the final act were under way, stage manager J. W. Thorpe saw a small flame on the left side of the stage. The fire issued from the lower part of a drop hanging below the rigging loft near the center stage border-light. The canvas was partially detached from the frame and, Thorpe thought, possibly slipped past the wire mesh border lamp guard and ignited. He estimated its size to be no larger than his hand. Though water buckets were once kept on the stage and in the rigging loft and though a two and a half inch (6.4 cm) water pipe still serviced a fire hose backstage, none of these facilities were readily available. Thorpe considered the fire hose, but there was much scenery in the way. Deciding that the fire would be well under way by the time the hose was in place, he opted to extinguish the flame by immediately available means. He directed carpenters Hamilton Weaver and William Van Sicken to extinguish the flame, which they attempted by beating the fire with long stage poles. Another carpenter who was backstage tried to fix the drop in one of the grooves but "could barely reach it with his hand and he drew it hastily up. The rapid motion through the air of the half ignited and highly flammable canvas, caused it to burst into a flame, which rapidly spread".

The curtains rose while backstage personnel hastened to bring the fire under control. After speaking a few lines, Kate Claxton was alerted by Lillian Cleves, who was standing behind the box set. She whispered sotto voce through the canvas that there was fire on stage and urged them to leave. Claxton recalled peering up through the flimsy canvas and seeing "sparks falling and little tongues of the fire licking the edges of the drops and borders that hung in the flies."

In spite of this, the actors continued with their performance, apparently thinking that any unusual behavior would only induce panic. Mrs. Mary Ann Farren made her entrance and after delivering her first lines, softly whispered, "The fire is steadily gaining."

The actors remained in character for only a little while longer, the audience growing increasingly restive. In spite of their efforts, the stage hands could not snuff the fire out; instead they had inadvertently knocked burning material free, spreading fire to the rigging loft. Bits of flaming debris were beginning to fall, descending onto the box set and other properties spread around backstage. Dickinson, sitting in the center parquet, saw a thin wreath of smoke curling along the ceiling of the boxed-in scene. "Immediately afterward, one corner of the canvas ceiling was raised, and through the opening thus made I saw the flames, and saw men trying to rake the fire off the ceiling [of the box set] with long poles." With smoldering debris falling onto the stage, the actors fell out of character. Many in the audience, already restive, rose from their seats and commenced to crowd the aisles.

=== Actors' attempt to extinguish the fire and quell panic ===
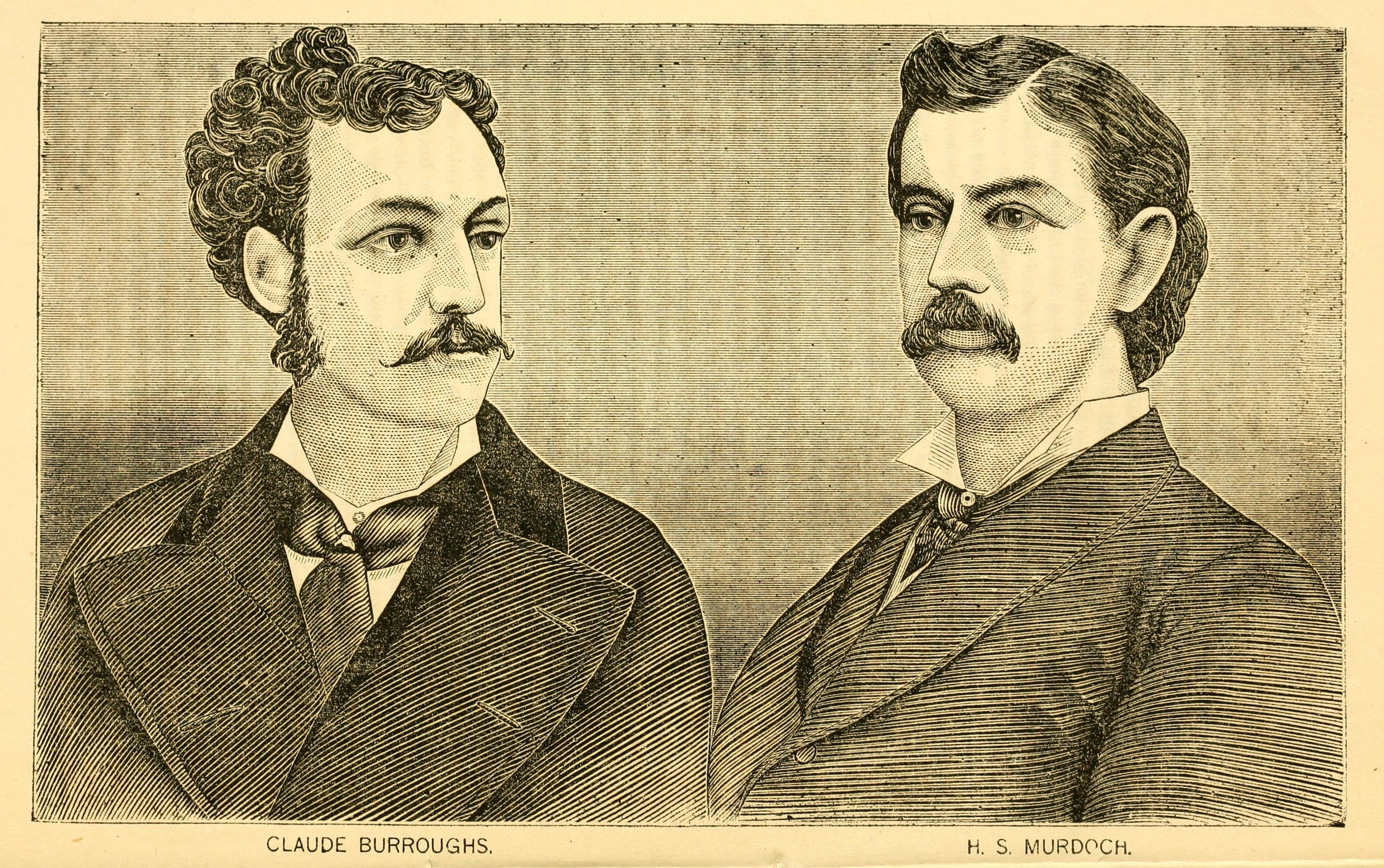
Claude Burroughs and H. S. Murdoch, two actors who died during the fire

Kate Claxton, H. S. Murdoch, and J. B. Studley at first urged the audience to be seated and "to be calm, as calmness was self possession, and self possession security". Thomas Rocheford, head usher, went to the auditorium when he heard someone yell 'Fire!' He later testified: "Mr. Studley and Mr. Murdoch sung out to the people to keep their seats. I also stopped quite a number going out who were making a rush. Finally a good many of them cooled down and took their seats."

From his vantage point in the family circle, Charles Vine thought that Claxton was "the nerviest woman I ever saw ... [She] came out with J. B. Studley, and said the fire would be out in a few moments. She was white as a sheet, but she stood up full of nerve."

The Brooklyn Daily Eagle reported Claxton saying, "There is no danger; the flames are a part of the play." The assertion was disingenuous – fire had no part in the story – and it would soon prove short-lived. "As she spoke," the Eagle continued, "a burning piece of wood fell at her feet, and she uttered an involuntary exclamation of alarm. This broke the spell which had heretofore held the audience."

Panic erupted. Thought turned to quelling it. J. B. Studley in particular reasoned: "If I have the presence of mind to stand here between you and the fire, which is right behind me, you ought to have the presence of mind to go out quietly." Kate Claxton echoed J. B. Studley's line, and stage manager J. W. Thorpe appeared, also urging an orderly exit. But the audience was now thoroughly panicked and ignored those on the stage.

Claxton later recalled, "We were now almost surrounded by flames; it was madness to delay longer. I took Mr. Murdoch by the arm and said 'Come, let us go.' He pulled away from me in a dazed sort of way and rushed into his dressing room, where the fire was even then raging ... To leap from the stage into the orchestra in the hope of getting out through the front of the house would only be to add one more to the frantic, struggling mass of human beings who were trampling each other to death like wild beasts."

Claxton remembered that a private passage led from the leading lady's dressing room, through the basement and to the box office. Through that she and fellow actress Maude Harrison bypassed much of the lobby crush. Murdoch and Claude Burroughs thought there was enough time to get their street clothes from their dressing rooms − it was December and their stage costumes were flimsy. They became trapped and did not escape. Some actors and stage hands left by the utility doors exiting onto Johnson Street, but the fire on the stage soon became widespread, cutting those exits off. All the remaining exits were in the front of the house, the main entrance exiting onto Washington street or the special exit doors leading into Flood's Alley.

== Theatre evacuation ==
=== Original Effects ===
While the actors were attempting to quell the panic, the head usher, Thomas Rocheford, went to the rear of the auditorium to open the Flood's Alley special exit door on the east end of the vestibule, opposite of the Washington Street entrances, one of the three special exit doors designed by architect Jackson. Since the doors were rarely used, he found the locking mechanism corroded; he was initially unable to open the doors. He found a small piece of metal in his pocket and with this was able to release the doors. This action enabled the people on the floor of the auditorium to evacuate the building fairly quickly, but Rocheford's action came at a cost. The open doors furnished airflow for the fire on the stage, which immediately grew in intensity.

=== Parquet ===
Despite the initial scenes of despair and panic that had issued from that quadrant, patrons in the lower parquet and parquet circle were able to escape in under three minutes, having access to Flood's Alley and Washington Street exits and having no flights of stairs to negotiate. The least crowded section of the theatre had the best evacuation routes.

=== Dress circle ===
Those in the second floor dress circle had to contend with stairs. The main flight led to the lobby and eventually the Washington Street exit; a second flight led to the Flood's Alley side door close to Johnson Street. Most favored the main flight because it was the way in which they had first entered the circle and were already familiar with it. The stairway was over seven feet (2.1 m) wide, and, according to Jackson's estimates, should have emptied the dress circle in under three minutes.

But as Brooklyn Police Fire Marshal Patrick Keady noted later in his Special Report, instead of the orderly procession that had originally informed Jackson's evacuation estimates, everyone attempted to sally the stairs at once. Anything but orderly, people jammed in the doorway and stumbled under the relentless press from people behind them. Their feet got caught in balustrades; they tripped and fell.

==== Dress circle crush ====
As they emerged from the dress circle stairs into the lobby, they encountered a stream of other patrons on their right rushing from the parquet and wheeling toward the Washington Street exit. After Thomas Rocheford had opened the Flood's Alley exit, they collided with an opposing stream working toward that door, which was situated beneath the flight of stairs descending from the dress circle. (See Floor Plan 2). The crush developing from these cross-currents soon brought the pace on the dress circle stairs to a halt, inducing a frenzied panic when people further up pressed downward, unaware of the jam below. Sergeant John Cain, arriving from the First Precinct station house next door, estimated that there were about 150 people jammed on the stairs when he arrived. He was joined by Van Sicken, who had been driven from the stage, and Mike Sweeny, the building janitor, and other first precinct officers. The men began untangling the people, struggling to reinstate forward motion and using billy clubs on those who attempted to rush or push.

==== Alternate exit attempt ====
Some people in the dress circle, familiar with the theatre, tried to avail themselves of the other exit leading into Flood's Alley, near the corner of Johnson Street. Patrons in the first rush down the stairs found the door locked; no usher was in sight. In the brief time it took them to discover that the door was locked and return to the dress circle, the stage had become engulfed and they had no recourse but to attempt to work their way down the main dress circle stairs to the lobby, adding their numbers to the crush on those stairs. Fire Marshal Keady would later write that he never found evidence that the exit had been opened.

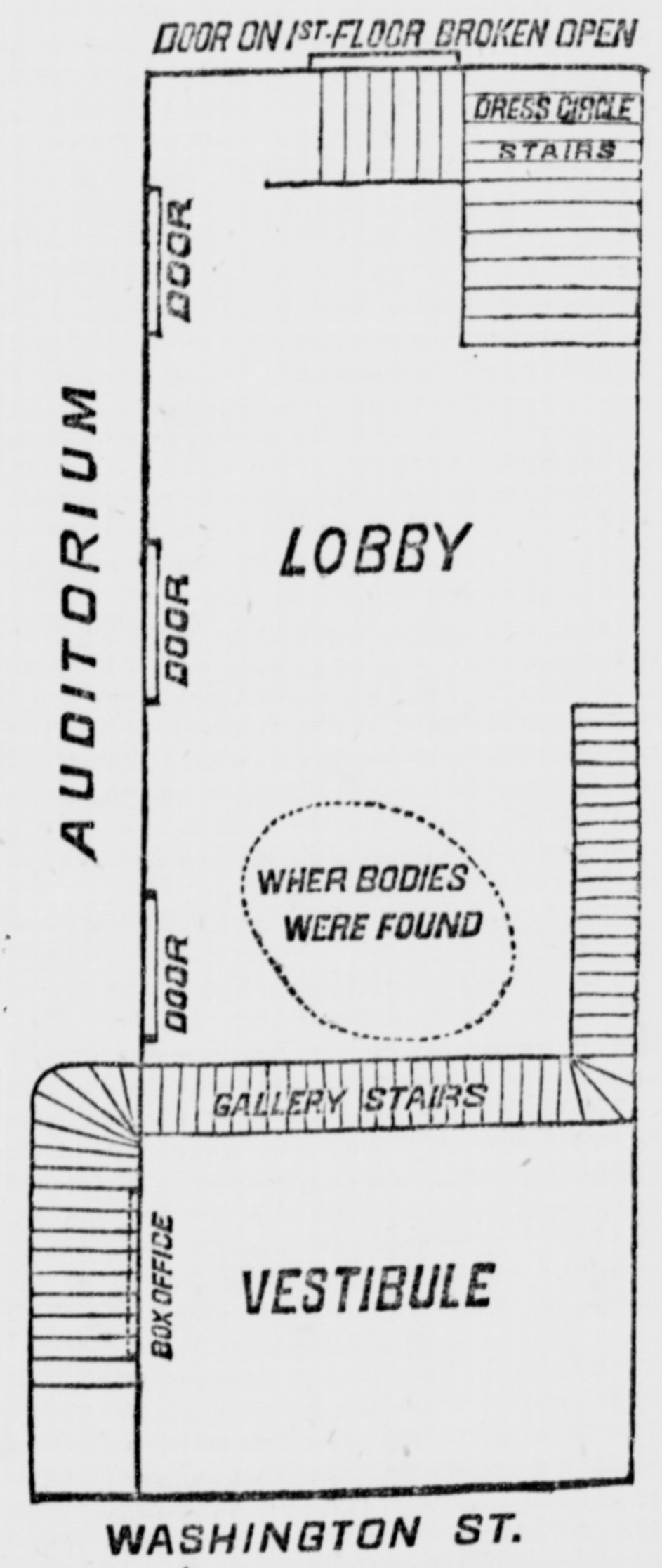
Brooklyn Theatre Floor Plan 2. Published in the New-York Tribune, December 7, 1876. Note: this plan is rotated counter-clockwise 90° with respect to the other floor plan; East on top, west on the bottom. The stairway to the family circle, the third floor gallery, ran eastward from Washington Street, bypassing the main lobby. It turned southward on the second floor, above the ceiling of the lobby and vestibule. It turned eastward again and ascended to the third floor. Its anchorage on the south wall can be seen in the photograph below. It is likely that a fatal crush developed on this stairway which was not noticed by firemen on the lower floor.

=== Family circle ===
Circumstances were only worse in the family circle. With around four hundred patrons seated there, it was served by a single, long stairway to street level. In the stairs leading off the gallery platform, there were two right-angled turns and two long passages. At six feet eight inches (2.03 m), it was wider than most gallery passages of that era, but with smoke accumulating under the ceiling and the family circle located in the highest reaches of the theatre, there was an urgency for everyone to leave. To complicate matters, gas pressure in the building was beginning to falter, dimming the stairway lamps.

==== Conditions ====
When fire entered the dry and superheated roof of the theatre, it spread with extreme rapidity. In the family circle, Charles Vine thought that less than four minutes passed from the time he saw fire on the stage to the arrival of smoke. To Officer G. A. Wessman, working to clear the crush in the dress circle, the smoke appeared as "a kind of dark blue [with] a most peculiar smell; no human being could live in it for two minutes." As it filled the upper reaches of the theatre, Wessman "heard cries and a thumping noise, as of persons falling or jumping."

==== Descending the gallery stairway ====
Charles Straub had a seat in the family circle close to the stairway; he was in the company of his friend Joseph Kreamer. He remembered, "we could hardly run down the stairs; we were crowded down." Though at first he saw no smoke, by the time he had been carried down to the last flight, it had grown thicker. There he tripped and people fell on top of him. By then the last flight of stairs was dark and full of smoke. Straub struggled up and stumbled forward. He estimated that about twenty-five people had gotten out ahead of him. Wondrously, though he had been pushed down three flights of stairs and thought that hundreds had fallen on top of him, only about ten or twelve people came out onto the street after him. He waited around the Washington Street entrance for three-quarters of an hour, but he never saw his friend Kreamer emerge from the stairway, nor did he ever see him again.

==== Jumping from the gallery ====
Charles Vine, who had been beguiled with Kate Claxton's nerve, was far away from those stairs. Claxton's assurances had induced him to wait in his seat for a few minutes, but the crowd growing on the stairs made him uneasy. The sight of men trampling women appalled him; the din was maddening. He thought everyone was going crazy. Above all, dense smoke was beginning to fill the gallery, reducing visibility and making breathing difficult.

He saw that movement down the stairway had stalled, with people piling over one another. He considered jumping from one of the windows facing Flood's Alley, but it was a sixty-foot (18 m) drop. He walked to the front of the gallery and decided to make his jump there. He fell to the dress circle below, severely cutting himself in the groin on the iron-backed chairs, but he retained consciousness and was able to run to the dress circle door.

There, he encountered another scene of bedlam, this one on the stairway from the dress circle, where people were struggling over those who had fallen on the stairs. Fortunately, Vine was now nearer the Washington Street entrance, where Cain and his fellow police officers were slowly reinstating some kind of rough order. He was able to gain the lobby and helped clear the crush around the stairs. He left the theatre, carrying a woman who had been trampled underneath and "who seemed as dead as a door nail". Fire Marshal Keady felt that Vine had been the last person to leave the family circle alive. When he had jumped, there were still many people frantically struggling to leave.

=== First responders and final evacuation ===
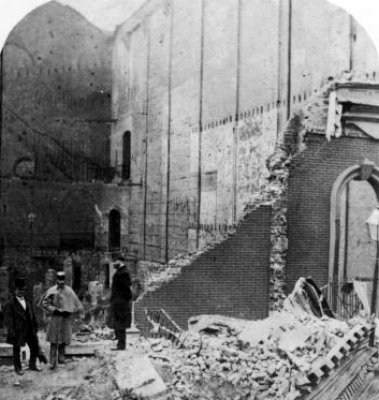
Brooklyn Theatre from Johnson Street, looking south from the stage area toward the front of the house. On the south wall of the theatre ruins, above the man in the light grey cape, are diagonal markings. These trace the flight of stairs from the gallery down to the second floor corridor and which had once been attached to the south wall of the theatre. The stairs themselves collapsed in the fire. The uppermost opening into masonry on the extreme right, above the man with the top hat, marks where the gallery stairs continued down to street level. Between this opening and the south wall ran a short, north–south corridor.

Inside the lobby, Sweeny, District Engineer Farley and his firemen, Cain, and the other police officers eventually cleared the dress circle stairs to work their way up to the doors, where there was the connecting doorway to the family gallery stairway. They tried going up to the family gallery but were stopped by thick smoke. They heard no traffic on the stairway, heard no human sounds. They called up but received no response. Farley ordered one last inspection of the dress circle, but saw no activity. Nor was there any signs of life in the parquet and orchestra, below, now burning fiercely. To Farley the building seemed evacuated, barring, perhaps, a few stragglers. Not wanting to subject himself or others to any further risk, he ordered his men to quit the building. Within minutes, cracks appeared on the exterior theatre walls facing Johnson street, where, within, the heart of the blaze raged. At 11:45 p.m., less than a half hour after J. W. Thorpe had spied a flame no larger than his hand, the Johnson Street end of the building collapsed and an intense rush of air was drawn in, feeding the flames. Anyone who could speak of events transpiring within the building had already left.

=== Waiting for the flames to die down ===
Thomas Nevins, Chief Engineer of the Brooklyn Fire Department, arrived at the theatre around 11:26 p.m.; he decided immediately that the building was lost and his job was one of confinement. Dieter Hotel, on the corner of Washington and Johnson streets, was lower than the theatre, its broad flat roof was an inviting target for flaming debris. The First Police Precinct station house, south of the theatre, was an old brick building with dry wooden support beams. Ramshackle wooden frame buildings stretched down the block on Flood's Alley opposite the burning theatre. At that point, the prevailing wind was from the west, carrying smoke and cinders east, dropping firebrands onto these old structures. The Post Office, south of the police station house, was filled with paper mail. Nevins had called in the second and third alarms while on the way to the fire; when the additional equipment arrived, he deployed the engines around the block to keep adjoining buildings free of sparks and burning debris.

By midnight, the fire had peaked, drawing around 5,000 spectators. It burned uncontrolled until around 1:00 am, and, in the wee hours, the walls along Flood's Alley collapsed, filling the alley with debris. By 3:00 am it began burning out. Nevins considered the blaze now partially under control.

Many survivors found a temporary haven in the First Precinct station house. After a Brooklyn Eagle reporter found her dazed near the Washington Street entrance, Kate Claxton was taken there. Dressed only in thin theatrical garb, she huddled in the station house. The enormous disaster would occur to her only in small, incongruous pieces. Sitting quietly in Captain Smith's office, she would suddenly mourn for some lost article of clothing, her seal skin sacque or jewelry. Later on, the thought that she had lost her purse and was penniless would haunt her. From time to time people would enter and she would ask them about H. S. Murdoch, the actor who had been on stage with her during her final minutes inside and who had rushed to his dressing room for outerwear. No one had seen him; she would beseech the person to go look for him. Eventually a waterproof cloak was found for her and she was driven to her rooms at Pierrepoint House.

Despite the large number of people inquiring after other people, the received wisdom of the wee morning hours was that most, if not all, people had gotten out alive. Among the police and fire fighters, this idea stemmed largely from the last searches of District Engineer Farley: no one had been seen in the parquet or parquet circle. No one had been seen in the dress circle. It was true that no one had physically checked the gallery, but people had called up there and received no reply, nor were there sounds of movement. The inclination was to hope for the best. True, when Charles Vine dropped himself off the gallery there had still been hundreds of people struggling on the staircase, but Vine had sought medical assistance for his deep cuts, so what he knew was not general knowledge. When the morning papers went to press, none carried news of casualties.

Shortly after 3:00 am, Chief Nevins attempted his first sally into the vestibule of the theatre; no one had been in there since District Chief Farley's departure more than three hours prior. His first attempts failed, but eventually he worked his way into the vestibule. Outside the doors leading into the lobby, he found the body of a woman, legs partially burned away, face and arms disfigured. She was sitting upright with her back against the south wall. Nevins decided that at that point there were likely many more bodies to be found. He kept the news confined to his senior District Engineers, not wishing to incur a stampede into the fragile theatre of people seeking loved ones.

== Aftermath ==
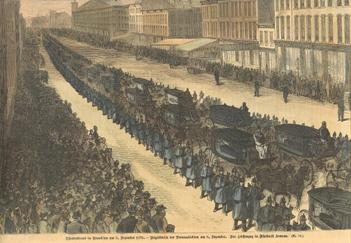
Funeral procession for victims of the fire on Flatbush Avenue on December 9

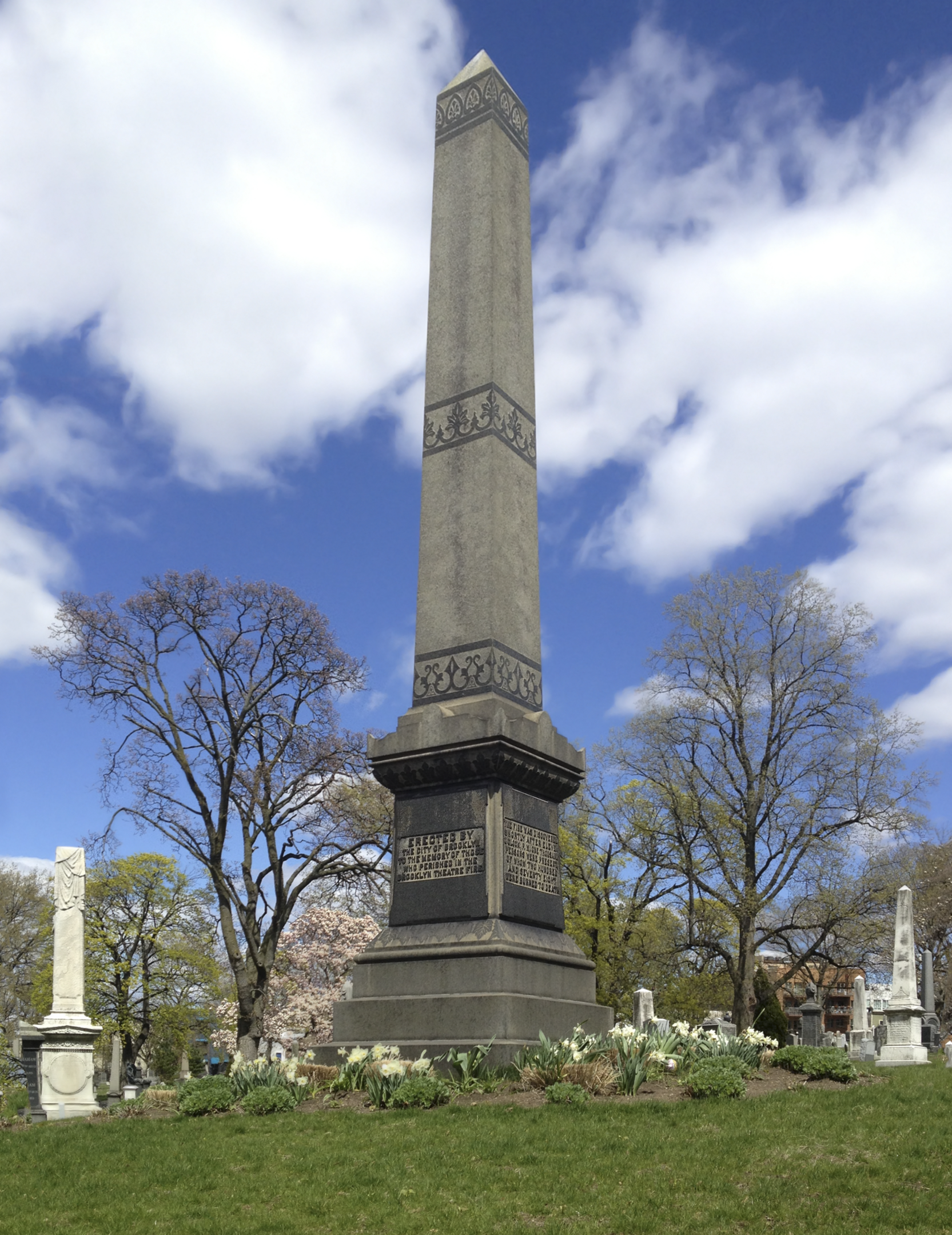
Memorial in Green-Wood Cemetery

The next foray into the building did not occur until the daylight hours. Chief Nevins had his District Engineers organize recovery parties. Except for a short segment of the vestibule, the building had mainly collapsed into the cellar and burned until the wood was consumed. What first appeared to be a great deal of rubbish in the cellar underneath the vestibule turned out to be largely human remains, a large mass of people which had fallen into twisted and distorted positions and then burned. These were mainly from the gallery and the stairway, which, in the original structure, had been above the vestibule ceiling against the south wall of the building.

Removal of these remains occupied much of the next three days. It was slow work; the conditions of the bodies were such that they would fall apart with only the slightest movement, and many had been mangled and dismembered. An exact body count was never obtained, given the state of forensic science in that era. With many bodies partially dismembered and scattered about by the gallery's collapse, and with faces burned beyond recognition, it was difficult to determine how many people were in a given pile of limbs, heads and trunks. The bodies could only be moved slowly. The capacity of the city morgue was quickly reached so an unused market on Adams Street was pressed into service. By Friday, December 8, Coroner Simms reported that 293 bodies had been taken from the theatre site. The number was by no means definitive. Later, his own Coroner's Report would cite 283 fatalities. Much later, the memorial stone erected in Green-Wood Cemetery would reference 278 deaths.

=== Reports ===
==== Coroner's report ====
The King's County coroner, Henry C. Simms, convened a jury on the disaster which heard testimony through December and January 1877. When it was published at the end of January 1877, it was especially harsh on the theatrical managers, Sheridan Shook and A. M. Palmer. The jury held Shook and Palmer responsible for failing to take adequate precautions against fire, failing to train stage hands in either fire prevention or the management of incipient fires, failing to establish clear chains of command in the theatre's management, permitting the stage to become cluttered with properties and failing to maintain in good working order fire fighting equipment and emergency exits that had originally been installed. The jury found lesser fault with the design of the building, observing that the five-year-old structure had better exits than many other public buildings in the city. Fault was found with the stairways leading to the family circle and the auditorium, which lacked a firewall between the audience and the stage. In delivering the verdict, the jury reported that death occurred mainly through suffocation in the dense smoke that prevailed in the gallery, likely in the few minutes after Charles Vine dropped from the family circle to the balcony below.

==== Fire Marshal's report ====
Police Fire Marshal Patrick Keady interviewed sixty-two people directly connected with the fire in the week following the blaze and delivered his report on December 18, 1876. He had been forcibly struck by the lack of use of water in any form of conveyance, though a two and a half inch (6.4 cm) pipe serviced the hydrant near the stage.

He was also forcibly struck by a certain laxness in the management of theatre by Shook and Palmer, especially in comparison to Sara Conway's management prior to her death. Many witnesses reported that Conway had insisted on filled water buckets to be positioned in various places back stage or in the rigging loft and kept the fire hose maintained. In contrast, Mike Sweeny could recall using the hose only once, and was not certain of its condition on the day of the fire; many of his colleagues thought the hose leaked and was up in the painter's gallery in the roof above the stage.

=== Later responses ===
While the immediate root cause of the conflagration found by Brooklyn police and fire authorities was negligence on behalf of the theatre lessees, Shook and Palmer, as time went on, theatre production practices that were regarded as acceptable risks in the 1870s were examined critically as the 20th century approached. Soon after the fire, The Evening Mirror began a campaign to eliminate or regulate many common theatre practices. Its agitation eventually spurred 1880s New York City fire code revisions barring the use of the stage in producing props and scenic elements, barring paints, wood, and construction material from the stage area, and widening theatre exits.

Commenting on theatre fires in his December 1905 address to the American Society of Mechanical Engineers, Society President John R. Freeman found significant antecedents in the Brooklyn Theatre fire to the then-recent Iroquois Theatre fire, the 1881 Vienna Ringtheater fire and the 1887 Exeter Theatre Fire: stages crowded with scenery, an onrush of air from opening doors or windows, scant smoke vents over the stage, this giving rise to an outburst of smoke from under the proscenium arch with concomitant deadly effects upon upper gallery occupants. These observations, made twenty-nine years after the fact, resonate with those made on the night of the Brooklyn Theatre fire. Engineer Fred J. Manning, Engine Number 5, arriving at 11:22 p.m., testified that the 20 ft wide (6.1 m) scene doors were about two-thirds open, with "one or two men attempting to bring something out of these doors." Abner C. Keeny, part owner and contractor of the building, commenting on the fire the following morning, believed that the sudden inrush of air from the scenic entrance fanned the fire and triggered its spread from the stage to the theatre at large, leading to the rapid advance of smoke onto the family circle.

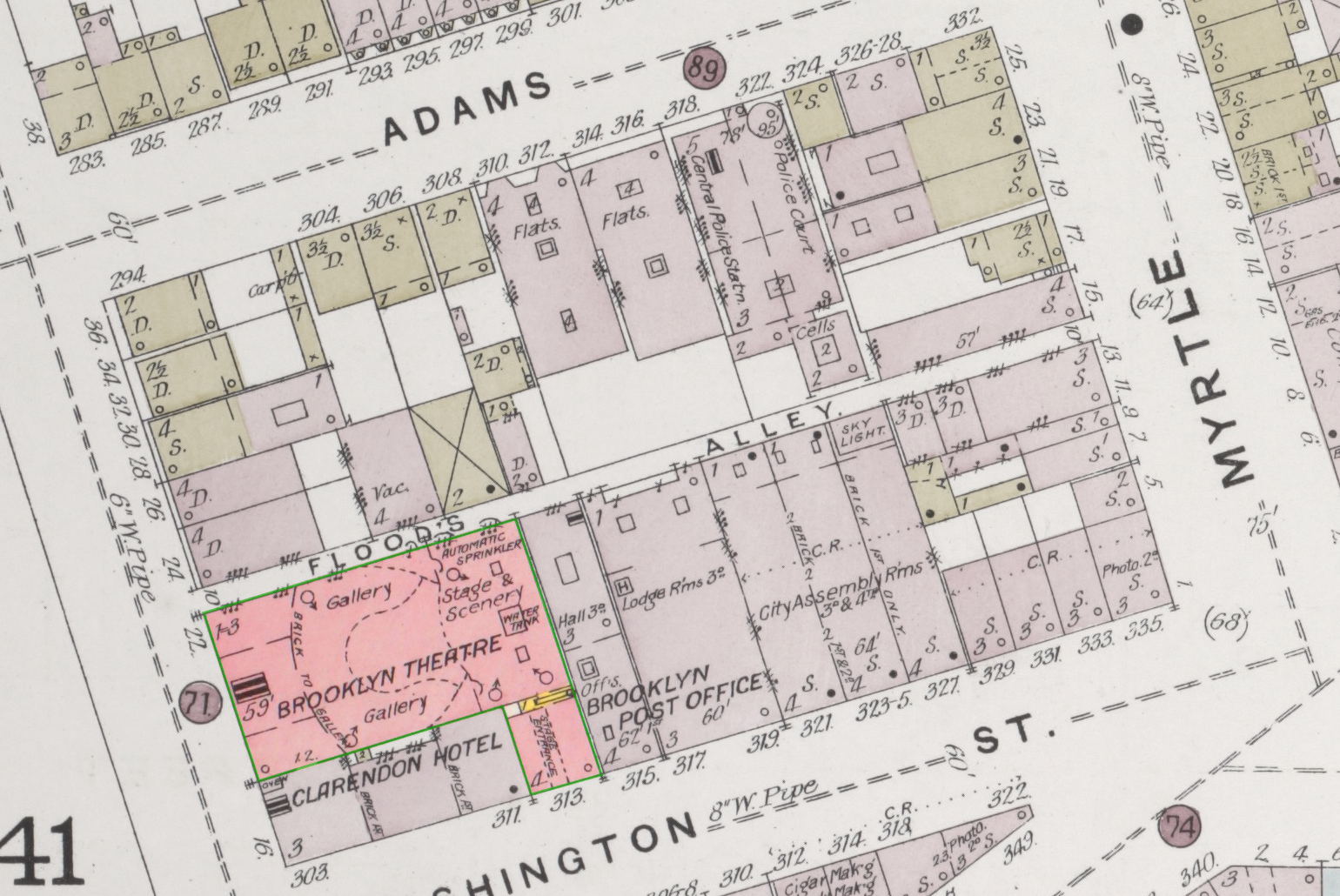
A map of the Brooklyn Theatre block, 1887, from the Sanborn insurance maps of Brooklyn (Volume 2, Plate 40). By 1887, the original theatre had been razed and a second theatre rose in its place, occupying the same L-shaped lot once held by the original building. The interior arrangement of this 'new' Brooklyn Theatre was wholly unlike the original structure, however: the stage and main entrances swapped positions, as did the stage and lobby. The block was still organized very much like it had been in late 1875, but would soon change in June 1890 when the second theatre and the old Clarendon Hotel were razed to make way for the Brooklyn Daily Eagle.

By the early 20th century, cumulative New York City building code changes and additions required a solid brick proscenium wall, extending from the cellar to the roof, to minimize the risk of a stage fire spreading into the auditorium. Any openings in the wall, such as the large opening made by the proscenium arch itself, required special fire blocking facilities. Proscenium arches were equipped with non-flammable fire curtains; other openings in the proscenium wall required self-closing fire-resistant doors. Heat activated sprinkling systems were required for the fly space above the stage. At this time in New York City, uniformed fire department officers became permanent attendees of every theatrical production. These 'Theatre Detail Officers' were required to be in the theatre a half-hour before the performance, test the fire alarms, inspect fire wall doors and the fire curtain, and, during performances, ensure that aisles, passageways and fire exits remain clear and accessible.

In the days following city officials were met with many families seeking news on loved ones and temporary financial support. The overwhelming demand of financial support caused undue stress on public finances due to disorganization. Due to many dishonest "affected families", the mayor cut off public funds for fire victims, instead calling for a private organization to vet and organize welfare for the victims affected by the disaster. Private relief funds were not uncommon at the time. After the Brooklyn Theatre Fire, the Brooklyn Theatre Fire Relief Association was formed to simplify efforts to support the families of the fire's victims. The relief efforts promptly raised $40,000 for the fire victims. Of the almost 300 fire victims, 188 families received aid from the BTFRA. Most families that were not helped either did not ask or had other means of support.

The privatization of disaster relief was part of a greater effort to enhance urban welfare. The fear of some in the public was that relief funds would be used to buy votes instead of helping the poor. The Brooklyn Theatre Fire Relief Association's success led to the elimination of outdoor relief from the Brooklyn county budget in 1878. The BTFRA was dissolved in 1879; however, the association had a lasting impact on welfare and disaster relief in America. By 1900, outdoor relief was halted in most major urban areas in the United States.

Kate Claxton wrote about the fire nine years later:

We thought we were acting for the best in continuing the play as we did, with the hope that the fire would be put out without difficulty, or that the audience would leave gradually or quietly. But the result proved that it was not the right course ... The curtain should have been kept down until the flames had been extinguished ... Raising the curtain created a draft which fanned the flames into fury.

— Kate Claxton, The New York Times, November 30, 1885

Kate Claxton's career drastically changed and was closely associated with this incident. It became a pop culture phenomenon to associate any major fire that occurred with her. She disliked this attention, but it did boost her popularity as people were drawn to potential drama ("Kate Claxton, Fire Jinx").

Haverly's Theatre was erected on the same site in 1879, but it was razed 11 years later to make way for new offices of The Brooklyn Daily Eagle. Mid-20th century urban renewal subsumed Washington Street, Flood's Alley, and the site of the fire, giving rise to Cadman Plaza. Cadman Plaza East follows the old Washington Street course but now terminates at Johnson Street. The New York Supreme Court Building is nearest to the site, now occupied by a park on the west side of the courthouse.

== Popular Culture ==
- "Brooklyn Fire" Words by George Cooper, 1876, music by Charles Albert White.
- "'Mid Flame and Smoke" Words & Music by Joseph W. Turner.
