= A. M. Palmer =

A. M. Palmer may refer to:

- A. M. Palmer (theater manager) (1838–1905), American theatrical manager
- A. Mitchell Palmer, (1872–1936), American attorney and politician
