= Eugène Cormon =

French dramatist and librettist

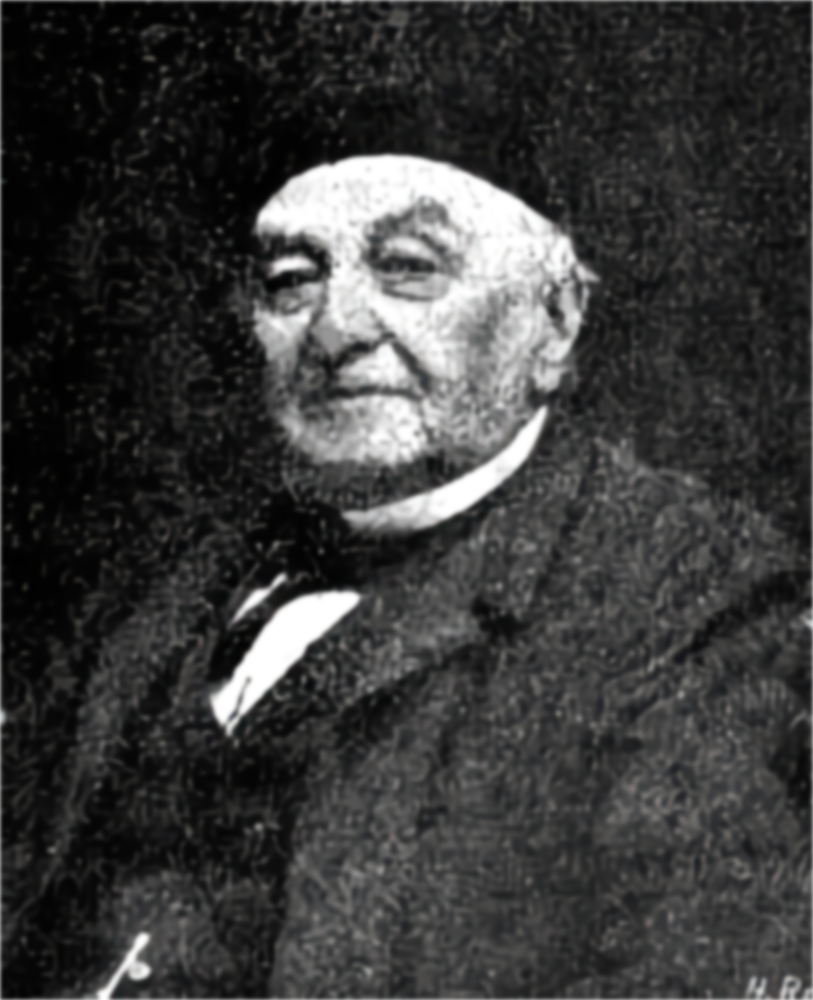
- Born: Pierre-Etienne Piestre; 5 May 1810; Lyon, France
- Died: March 1903; Paris, France
- Occupation: Dramatist • Librettist
- Spouse: Actress Charlotte Furais: son: Artist Fernand Cormon
- Writing career
- Genre: Drama • Comedy • Melodrama • Opera

Pierre-Étienne Piestre, known as Eugène Cormon (5 May 1810 – March 1903), was a French dramatist and librettist. He used his mother's name, Cormon, during his career, which lasted from 1832 to 1878.

== Life and career ==
Cormon was the son of Jean-Louis Piestre, chef de bureau at the préfecture du Rhône, and Jeanne Cormon, descendent of the family of the Libraires Cormon, whose name he used professionally.

Cormon wrote dramas, comedies and, from the 1840s, libretti; around 150 of his works were published. He was stage manager at the Paris Opéra from 1859 to 1870 where he was in charge of the 1865 premiere of Meyerbeer's last opera, L'Africaine, and was administrator of the Théâtre du Vaudeville from 1874.

The Fontainebleau act as well as the auto-da-fé scene of Verdi's opera Don Carlos are based in part on Cormon's 1846 play Philippe II, Roi d'Espagne ("Philip II, King of Spain").

He married the actress Caroline Paris (Charlotte Faris) in 1838, and they had a son, the painter Fernand Cormon. He was made a chevalier de la Légion d'honneur in 1860.

After his funeral at the Temple protestant du Saint-Esprit de Paris, rue Roquépine, he was buried at the cimetière de Montmartre

At the Moscow Art Theatre in 1927 the seminal Russian theatre practitioner Constantin Stanislavski staged Cormon's melodrama The Gérard Sisters (The Two Orphans), which he co-wrote with Adolphe d'Ennery.

== Libretti ==
- Gastibelza, opera, with Adolphe d'Ennery, music by Louis-Aimé Maillart, 1847.
- Les deux Sergents, with Saint-Amand, music by Nicolas Louis, 1850.
- Le Chien du Jardinier, one-act opéra-comique, with Lockroy, music by Albert Grisar, 1855.
- Les Dragons de Villars, opéra-comique, with Lockroy, music by Louis-Aimé Maillart, 1856.
- Le Château Trompette, opera, with Michel Carré, music by François-Auguste Gevaert, 1860. Johann Strauss's 1883 operetta Eine Nacht in Venedig with libretto by F. Zell and Richard Genée, is based on this.
- Les Pêcheurs de perles, opera, with Michel Carré, music by Georges Bizet, 1863.
- José Maria, opéra-comique, with Henri Meilhac, music by Jules Cohen, 1866.
- Robinson Crusoé, opéra-comique, with Hector Crémieux, music by Jacques Offenbach, 1867.
- Le premier jour de bonheur, opéra comique in three acts, with d'Ennery, music by Daniel Auber (based on Joseph-François Souque's Le chevalier de Canolle).

== Plays ==
- Les Honneurs sans profits, two-act comédie vaudeville, with Augustin Lagrange, 1832.
- Les Crochets du père Martin. Drama in three acts, with Eugène Grangé, 1858)
- Un aveu, one-act comédie-vaudeville, with Lagrange, 1833.
- Flore et Zéphyr, folie-vaudeville en un acte, avec Lagrange, 1834.
- Les Gueux de mer, ou la Belgique sous Philippe II, three-act drame, with Lagrange, 1835.
- Le Prisonnier d'une femme, one-act comédie-vaudeville, with Lagrange, 1836.
- Le Mariage en capuchon, two-act comédie-vaudeville, with Lagrange, 1838.
- César Birotteau, drame-vaudeville in three acts, with Lagrange and Honoré de Balzac, 1838.
- Corneille et Rotrou, one-act comédie with Ferdinand de Laboullaye, 1845.
- Philippe II, roi d'Espagne, drame, 1846.
- Les Deux Orphelines. Drama in five acts (with Adolphe d'Ennery, 20 January 1874)
- Une Cause célèbre. Drama in six acts (with Adolphe d'Ennery, 1877)

== Filmography ==
The following films are based on works by Cormon

- A Celebrated Case, directed by George Melford (1914, based on the play Une Cause célèbre)
- The Two Orphans, directed by Herbert Brenon (1915, based on the playThe Two Orphans)
- Orphans of the Storm, directed by D. W. Griffith (1921, based on The Two Orphans)
- Les Deux orphelines, directed by Maurice Tourneur (France, 1933, based on The Two Orphans)
- La gerla di papà Martin, directed by Mario Bonnard (Italy, 1940, based on the play Les Crochets du père Martin)
- The Two Orphans, directed by Carmine Gallone (Italy, 1942, based on The Two Orphans)
- The Two Orphans, directed by José Benavides (Mexico, 1944, based on The Two Orphans)
- The Two Orphans, directed by Hassan al-Imam (Egypt, 1949, based on The Two Orphans)
- The Two Orphans, directed by Roberto Rodríguez (Mexico, 1950, based on The Two Orphans)
- A Night in Venice, directed by Georg Wildhagen (Austria, 1953, based on the operetta Eine Nacht in Venedig)
- The Two Orphans, directed by Giacomo Gentilomo (Italy, 1954, based on The Two Orphans)
- Les Deux orphelines, directed by Riccardo Freda (France/Italy, 1965, based on The Two Orphans)
- The Two Orphans, directed by Leopoldo Savona (Spain, 1976, based on The Two Orphans)

== Sources ==
- Benedetti, Jean (1999), Stanislavski: His Life and Art. Revised edition. Original edition published in 1988. London: Methuen. ISBN 0-413-52520-1.
- Budden, Julian (1984), The Operas of Verdi, Volume 3: From Don Carlos to Falstaff. London: Cassell. ISBN 0-304-30740-8
- Kimball, David (2001), in Holden, Amanda (Ed.), The New Penguin Opera Guide, New York: Penguin Putnam, 2001. ISBN 0-14-029312-4
- Walsh, T. J. (1981), Second Empire Opera: The Théâtre Lyrique Paris 1851–1870. London: John Calder.
- Wright, Lesley (1998), "Eugene Cormon" in Stanley Sadie, (Ed.), The New Grove Dictionary of Opera, Vol. One. London: Macmillan Publishers, Inc. 1998 ISzrgbb BN 0-333-73432-7 ISBN 1-56159-228-5
