= The Two Orphans (1950 film) =

1950 film

- Directed by: Roberto Rodríguez
- Written by: Adolphe d'Ennery (play); Eugène Cormon (play); Carlos González Dueñas
- Starring: Evita Muñoz; María Eugenia Llamas; Joaquín Cordero
- Cinematography: Raúl Martínez Solares
- Edited by: Fernando Martinez
- Production company: Películas Latinoamericanas
- Release date: 18 October 1950
- Running time: 104 minutes
- Country: Mexico
- Language: Spanish

The Two Orphans (Spanish: Las dos huerfanitas) is a 1950 Mexican drama film directed by Roberto Rodríguez and starring Evita Muñoz, María Eugenia Llamas and Joaquín Cordero. It is an adaptation of the play The Two Orphans by Adolphe d'Ennery and Eugène Cormon. The film's sets were designed by the art director Carlos Toussaint.

== Cast ==
- Evita Muñoz as Elvira Pérez
- María Eugenia Llamas as Teresita
- Joaquín Cordero as Morete
- Freddy Fernandez as Avispa
- Miguel Córcega as Arturo
- Miguel Manzano as don Alfonso
- Nicolás Rodríguez as Doctor
- Silvia Derbez as Mascotita
- Domingo Soler as Tío de Teresita
- Luis Badillo as Matias, cantinero
- Victorio Blanco as Policía
- Guillermo Bravo Sosa
- Lupe Carriles as Vendedora de frutas
- Edmundo Espino as Boticario
- Magdalena Estrada as Vendedora de flores
- Leonor Gómez as Juana
- Ángel Infante as Empleado hospital
