= Kate Claxton =

American actress

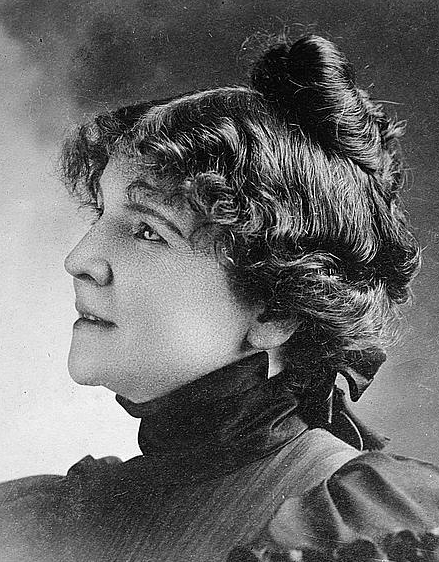
- Born: August 24, 1848; Somerville, New Jersey
- Died: May 5, 1924 (aged 75); New York City, New York
- Resting place: Green-wood Cemetery; Brooklyn, New York
- Occupations: Stage actress, screenwriter
- Spouses: Isidore Lyon; Charles A. Stevenson

Kate Claxton (August 24, 1848 – May 5, 1924) was an American actress.

== Biography ==
Kate Elizabeth Cone was born at Somerville, New Jersey, to Spencer Wallace Cone and Josephine Martinez. She made her first appearance on the stage in Chicago with Lotta Crabtree in 1870, and in the same year, joined Augustin Daly's Fifth Avenue Theatre in New York City. In 1872, she became a member of A.M. Palmer's Union Square Theatre, playing largely comedy roles. She created the part of Louise in The Two Orphans and then became known as one of the best emotional actresses of her time. Her first starring tour was in 1876.

She was performing the play The Two Orphans on December 5, 1876, at the Brooklyn Theatre in New York when a fire broke out and killed 278 people.

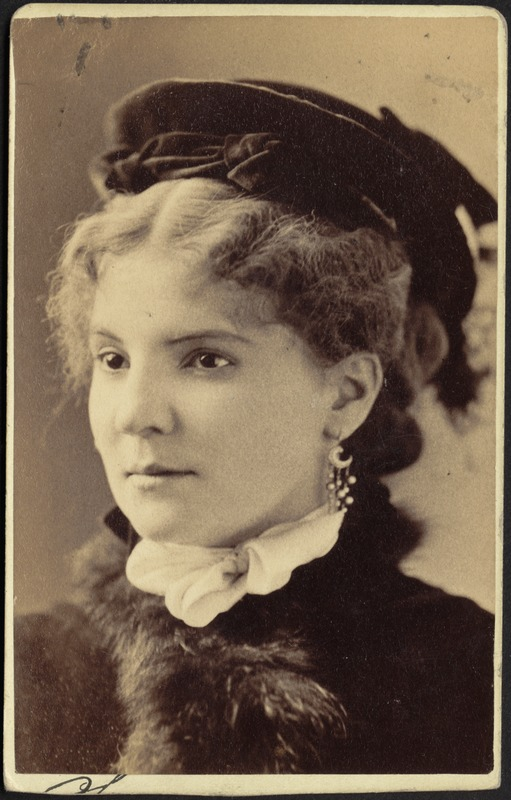
Kate Claxton, [ca. 1859–1870]. Carte de Visite Collection, Boston Public Library

Claxton first married in 1865 to Isadore Lyon; they later divorced. On March 3, 1878, she married Charles A. Stevenson, and in 1911, they divorced. Her son Harold Stevenson committed suicide in 1904.

Claxton died due to a cerebral hemorrhage in her apartment in New York City; she was buried in Brooklyn's Green-Wood Cemetery.

Claxton, Georgia is said by some local historians to be named for her.
