= Adolphe d'Ennery =

French playwright and novelist

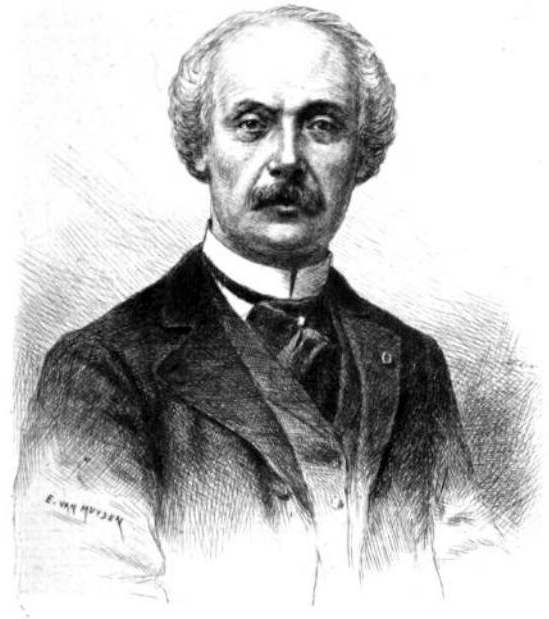
Adolphe d'Ennery.

Adolphe d'Ennery (French pronunciation: [adɔlf dɛnʁi]; or Dennery; né Adolphe Philippe; 17 June 1811 – 25 January 1899) was a French playwright and novelist.

== Life ==
Born in Paris, his real surname was Philippe. He obtained his first success in collaboration with Charles Desnoyer in Émile, ou le fils d'un pair de France (1831), a drama which was the first of a series of some two hundred pieces written alone or in collaboration with other dramatists. He died in Paris in 1899.

== Works ==
Among the best of his works is a play about Kaspar Hauser (1838) with Auguste Anicet-Bourgeois; Les Bohémiens de Paris (1842) with Eugène Grangé; with Julien de Mallian the play Marie-Jeanne, ou la femme du peuple (1845), in which Marie Dorval obtained a great success; a drama based on Uncle Tom's Cabin (1853) with Dumanoir; and The Two Orphans (1875), perhaps his best piece, with Eugène Cormon. The story was adapted in 1921 by D.W. Griffith as the film Orphans of the Storm.

He wrote the libretto for Gounod's Le tribut de Zamora (1881); with Louis Gallet and Édouard Blau he composed the libretto to Massenet's Le Cid (1885); and, again in collaboration with Cormon, the librettos of Auber's operas, Le premier jour de bonheur (1868) and Rêve d'amour (1869). Other opera librettos include La rose de Terone (1840), Si j'étais roi (1852), Le muletier de Tolède (1854) (on which Michael Balfe's The Rose of Castille (1857) was based), and À Clichy (1854) by Adolphe Adam, Massenet's early Don César de Bazan (1872) and Hervé's La nuit aux soufflets (1884) He prepared for the stage Balzac's posthumous comedy Mercadet ou le faiseur, presented at the Théâtre du Gymnase in 1851. Reversing the usual order of procedure, d'Ennery adapted some of his plays to the form of novels.

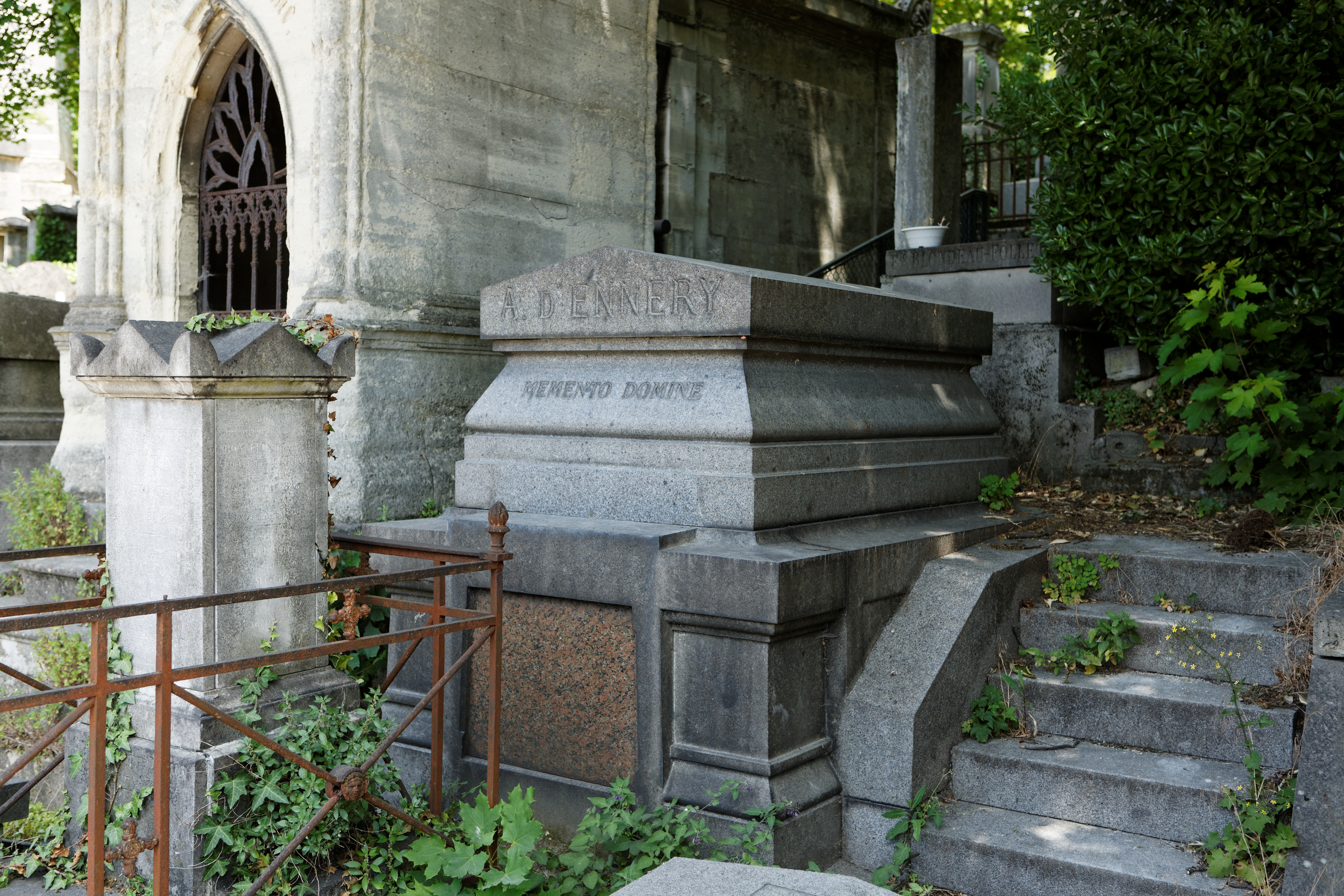
D'Ennery's grave at Père Lachaise cemetery

== Filmography ==
- A Celebrated Case, directed by George Melford (1914, based on the play Une Cause célèbre)
- Don Caesar de Bazan, directed by Robert G. Vignola (1915, based on the play Don César de Bazan)
- The Two Orphans, directed by Herbert Brenon (1915, based on the play The Two Orphans)
- Martyre, directed by Camillo De Riso (Italy, 1917, based on the play Martyre!)
- Don Cesar, Count of Irun, directed by Luise Kolm and Jacob Fleck (Austria, 1918, based on the play Don César de Bazan)
- The Adventurer, directed by J. Gordon Edwards (1920, based on the play Don César de Bazan)
- Belphegor the Mountebank, directed by Bert Wynne (UK, 1921, based on the play Paillasse)
- Orphans of the Storm, directed by D. W. Griffith (1921, based on the play The Two Orphans)
- Rosita, directed by Ernst Lubitsch (1923, based on the play Don César de Bazan)
- The Spanish Dancer, directed by Herbert Brenon (1923, based on the play Don César de Bazan)
- Martyre, directed by Charles Burguet (France, 1927, based on the play Martyre!)
- The Two Orphans, directed by Maurice Tourneur (France, 1933, based on the play The Two Orphans)
- The Two Orphans, directed by Carmine Gallone (Italy, 1942, based on the play The Two Orphans)
- Don Cesare di Bazan, directed by Riccardo Freda (Italy, 1942, based on the play Don César de Bazan)
- The Two Orphans, directed by José Benavides (Mexico, 1944, based on the play The Two Orphans)
- The Two Orphans, directed by Hassan al-Imam (Egypt, 1949, based on the play The Two Orphans)
- The Two Orphans, directed by Roberto Rodríguez (Mexico, 1950, based on the play The Two Orphans)
- Appassionatamente, directed by Giacomo Gentilomo (Italy, 1954, based on the play La Dame de Saint-Tropez)
- The Two Orphans, directed by Giacomo Gentilomo (Italy, 1954, based on the play The Two Orphans)
- The Seventh Sword, directed by Riccardo Freda (Italy, 1962, based on the play Don César de Bazan)
- The Two Orphans, directed by Riccardo Freda](France/Italy, 1965, based on the play The Two Orphans)
- The Two Orphans, directed by Leopoldo Savona (Spain, 1976, based on the play The Two Orphans)
