= A Celebrated Case =

- Directed by: George Melford?
- Written by: Gene Gauntier (scenario)
- Based on: play Une cause célèbre by Adolphe Philippe Dennery and Eugene Cormon
- Starring: Alice Joyce; Guy Coombs; Marguerite Courtot
- Production company: Kalem Company
- Distributed by: General Film. Co., Special Features Dept.
- Release date: May 1914
- Running time: Four reels
- Country: United States
- Language: Silent

A Celebrated Case is a 1914 American silent drama film starring Alice Joyce, Guy Coombs and Marguerite Courtot. It is based on the 1877 play Une cause célèbre by Adolphe Philippe Dennery and Eugene Cormon. A French soldier is wrongfully sentenced to the galleys for the murder of his wife.

It is considered to be a lost film.

== Cast ==
- Alice Joyce as Madeline Renaud
- Guy Coombs as Jean Renaud
- Marguerite Courtot as Adrienne
- James B. Ross as Adrienne's Father
- Harry F. Millarde as Lazare
- Alice Hollister
