= ¡Que bravas son las costeñas! =

1955 Mexican film

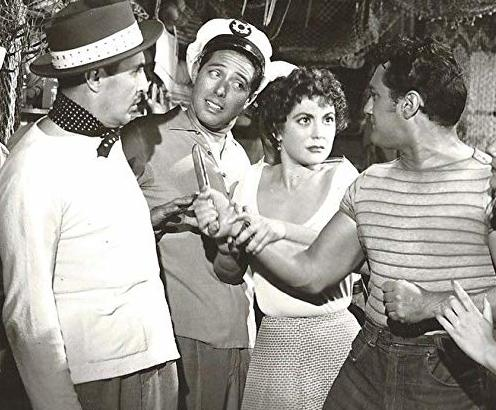
- A production still from the film
- Directed by: Roberto Rodríguez
- Written by: Carlos González Dueñas; Ricardo Parada de León; Roberto Rodríguez
- Produced by: Aurelio García Yévenes
- Starring: María Antonieta Pons; Andy Russell; Evangelina Elizondo
- Cinematography: Alex Phillips
- Edited by: Fernando Martínez Álvarez
- Music by: Sergio Guerrero
- Production company: Producciones Rodríguez Hermanos
- Distributed by: Azteca Films Inc. (United States)
- Release date: 2 June 1955
- Country: Mexico
- Language: Spanish

¡Que bravas son las costeñas! is a 1955 Mexican film directed by Roberto Rodríguez and starring María Antonieta Pons, Andy Russell and Evangelina Elizondo. The film was shot in Acapulco, which stood in for Veracruz.

== Plot ==
Two girls from a coastal town, one from a distinguished family and the other from humble origins, fight for the love of a Mexican-American playboy who anchors his yacht in front of the town.

== Cast ==
- María Antonieta Pons as Maritoña (as Ma. Antonieta Pons)
- Andy Russell as Tony López
- Evangelina Elizondo as Beatriz
- Joaquín Cordero as Pedro
- Jorge Reyes as Che Méndez (as Jorge 'Che' Reyes)
- Miguel Manzano as Señor cura
- Lupe Rivas Cacho as Tía Catita
- Manuel Arvide as Don Justo
- Conchita Gentil Arcos as Tía Nena
- Elodia Hernández as Tía Moni
- Óscar Jaimes as Alfonso (Ponchito)
- Francisco Pando as Don Fermín

Kitty de Hoyos makes a small, uncredited appearance as a girl in a store, in her film debut.

== Release ==
The film premiered in Mexico at the Cine Olympia cinema on 2 June 1955, and was in marquee for three weeks. The film was also shown in the United States, in Los Angeles, with Russell and Elizondo attending a screening there.

== Analysis ==
The film was noted for its resemblance to European films of the time, especially French and Italian film, in which women appeared in what was described as "more or less daring partial nudity".

== Bibliography ==
- García Riera, Emilio (1992). Historia documental del cine mexicano. Vol. 7–8. Mexico: Universidad de Guadalajara.
- Amador, María Luisa; Ayala Blanco, Jorge (1985). Cartelera cinematográfica, 1950-1959 (in Spanish). UNAM. ISBN 978-968-837-327-9.
- Carrara, Miguel (2010). El cine que el viento se llevó (in Spanish). Editorial Los Reyes. ISBN 978-968-5237-21-5.
- Guerrero, 1849-1999 (in Spanish). Gobierno del Estado de Guerrero. 1999. ISBN 978-970-18-4221-8.
- Loza, Steven Joseph (1993). Barrio Rhythm: Mexican American Music in Los Angeles. University of Illinois Press. ISBN 978-0-252-06288-9.
