= The Two Orphans (1949 film) =

Al-Yateematain
- Movie poster
- Directed by: Hassan Al Imam
- Written by: Abo El Seoud El Ebiary
- Produced by: Asia
- Starring: Faten Hamama; Souraya Helmy; Negma Ibrahim
- Release date: 1949
- Country: Egypt
- Language: Arabic

Al-Yateematain (Arabic: اليتيمتين, The Two Orphans) is a 1949 Egyptian drama film written by Abo El Seoud El Ebiary directed by Hassan Al Imam starring Egyptian actress Faten Hamama. The film was based on the play The Two Orphans by Adolphe d'Ennery and Eugène Cormon.

== Plot ==
Hamama portrays the role of Neimat, a young girl who loses her sight due to a wrong usage of sodium as eye drops, and who is exploited later by a gangster who forces her to be a beggar in the streets.

== Cast ==
- Faten Hamama
- Souraya Helmy
- Negma Ibrahim
