= Le premier jour de bonheur =

Opera by Daniel Auber

- Opéra comique by Daniel Auber
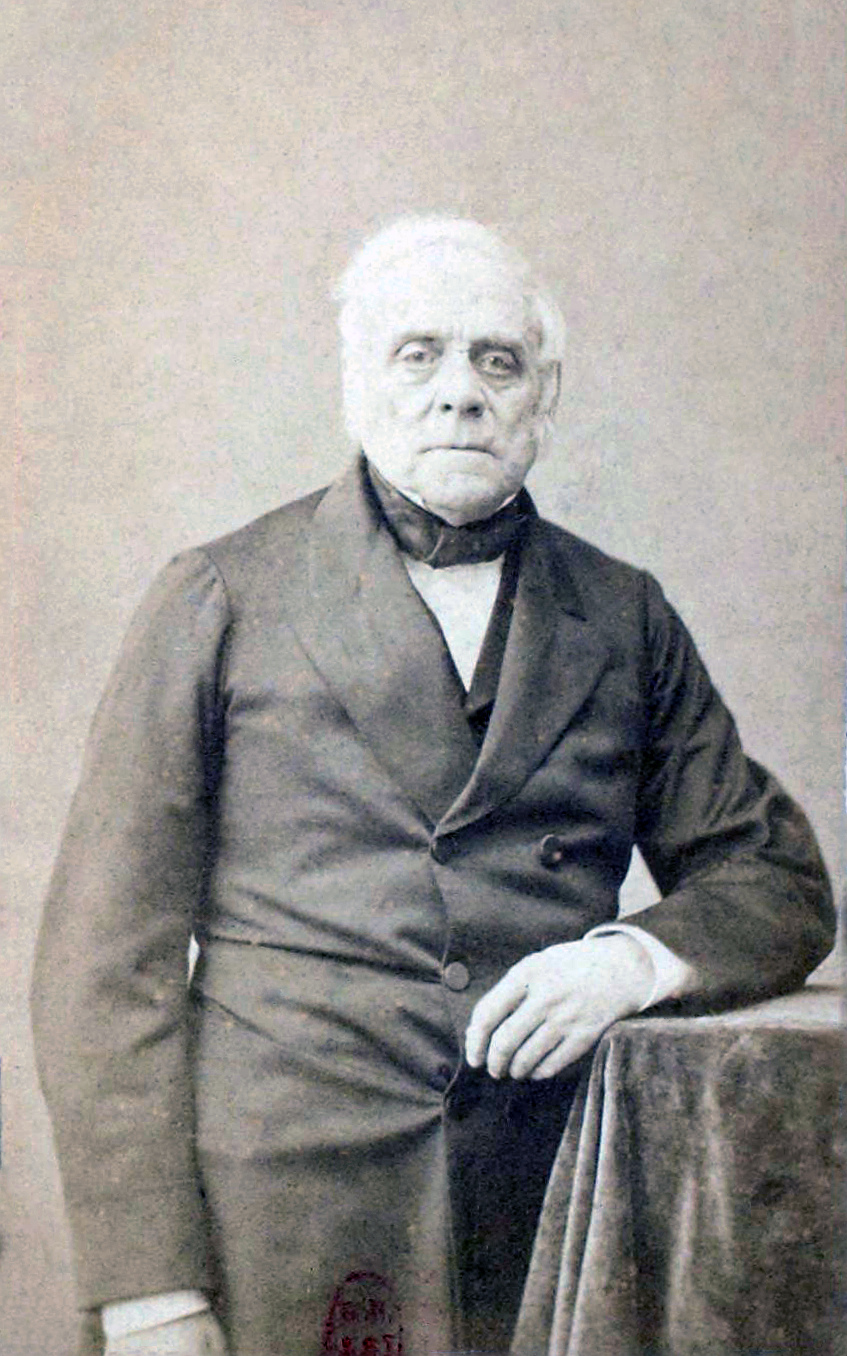
- The composer c. 1860
- Librettist: Adolphe d'Ennery; Eugène Cormon
- Language: French
- Based on: Souque's Le chevalier de Canolle
- Premiere: 15 February 1868; Salle Favart, Paris

Le premier jour de bonheur is an opera or opéra comique in three acts by Daniel Auber. The French libretto by Adolphe d'Ennery and Eugène Cormon is based on Joseph François Souque's Le chevalier de Canolle. The work's premiere was staged by the Opéra-Comique at the Salle Favart theatre on 15 February 1868.

The opera is set in Madras at the end of the 18th century, with a mixture of sentimental elegance and precious sensibility amid a picturesque story bearing resemblances to Léo Delibes’s Lakmé: the Indian setting, a military officer – one French, the other English – and a priestess – Djelma, Lakmé.

The scenario was proposed to Auber around 1865 by Victorien Sardou, and was first announced for production in September 1866 under another title. The rôle of Hélène was intended as the debut of a brilliant student of Eugénie Garcia, but a court ruling in January 1868 following a case brought by her parents delayed her debut until the following year. In view of this cast change, the role of Hélène was modified. A highpoint of the work is the 'song of the Djinns' for Djelma which became immediately popular, although it was only inserted by the composer at the last minute (possibly a rejected number from Le cheval de bronze of thirty years previously). It was hoped to premiere the piece on 27 January (to celebrate the composer’s birthday) but as there was some orchestration outstanding, it was delayed.

Le premier jour de bonheur was at first a good financial success for the Salle Favart, achieving 175 performances before dropping out of the repertoire by the end of the century.

Johann Strauss II wrote a quadrille on themes from the opera as his opus 327.

== Roles ==
Role	Voice type	Premiere cast, 15 February 1868 (Conductor: –)
Gaston de Maillepré	tenor	Victor Capoul
Hélène	soprano	Marie Cabel
Duke de Mailly	baritone	Léon Melchissédec
Sir John	tenor	Charles-Louis Sainte-Foy
Djelma	soprano	Marie Roze
Bergerac	bass	Prilleux
The Governor	bass	Bernard

== Synopsis ==
Time: Late 18th century
Place: Madras

=== Act 1 ===
A French post in India

Gaston de Maillepré, a French officer in India, tells the Indian priestess Djelma of his love for an unknown Englishwoman. She turns up in the company of her fiancé, Sir John Littlepool, who has been arrested as a spy. Gaston learns that the woman, (Hélène), is the niece of the governor of Madras, and releases her, keeping Littlepool as a hostage.

=== Act 2 ===
Madras

Although protected by a flag of truce, Gaston is arrested by the English when he comes to Madras seeking Hélène. In the meantime, Littlepool has been condemned to death by the French as a spy, and Gaston is sentenced to be shot at dawn in revenge. However, he is gratified when Hélène declares her love for him.

=== Act 3 ===
Madras; Dawn of the next day

Littlepool suddenly appears: he has been released by the French, with the condition that Gaston be returned alive. However, Gaston refuses to leave Hélène, preferring execution. Littlepool, fearing French revenge, renounces his claims on Hélène, allowing her to marry Gaston, which results in Maillepré's "premier jour de bonheur".
