= Theatre Detail Officers =

FDNY Firefighters assigned to theaters for fire safety

In New York City during the early 20th Century, regulations were enacted which required uniformed fire department officers to be permanent attendees of every theatrical production. These Theatre Detail Officers were required to be in the theatre a half-hour before the performance, test the fire alarms, inspect fire wall doors and the fire curtain, and, during performances, ensure that aisles, passageways and fire exits remain clear and accessible.

This public-safety measure was part of a group of fire safety measures that were enacted as a result of several theater fires which occurred during that general time period. In December 1905, commenting on theatre fires in his address to the American Society of Mechanical Engineers, Society President John R. Freeman found significant antecedents in the Brooklyn Theatre fire to the then-recent Iroquois Theatre fire, the 1881 Vienna Ringtheater fire and the 1887 Exeter Theatre Fire: stages crowded with scenery, an onrush of air from opening doors or windows, scant smoke vents over the stage, this giving rise to an outburst of smoke from under the proscenium arch with concomitant deadly effects upon upper gallery occupants.

These observations were made twenty-nine years after the disastrous Brooklyn Theatre fire (1876). Engineer Fred J. Manning, Engine Number 5, arriving at 11:22 p.m., testified that the 20 ft wide (6.1 m) scene doors were about two-thirds open, with "one or two men attempting to bring something out of these doors." Abner C. Keeny, part owner and contractor of the building, commenting on the fire the following morning, believed that the sudden inrush of air from the scenic entrance fanned the fire and triggered its spread from the stage to the theatre at large, leading to the rapid advance of smoke onto the family circle.

== See also ==
- New York City Fire Department
- Firefighters
- Firefighting
