= Orphans of the Storm =

1921 film directed by D. W. Griffith

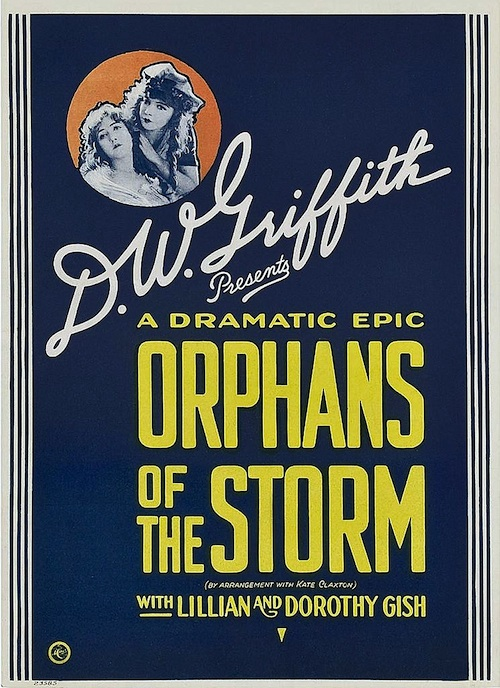
- Original theatrical poster
- Directed by: D. W. Griffith
- Screenplay by: D. W. Griffith
- Based on: Les Deux Orphelines (play) by Adolphe d'Ennery and Eugène Cormon
- Produced by: D. W. Griffith
- Starring: Lillian Gish; Dorothy Gish
- Cinematography: Billy Bitzer; Hendrik Sartov; Paul Allen; Herbert Sutch
- Edited by: James Smith; Rose Smith
- Music by: Louis F. Gottschalk (original score as performed in cinemas in 1921); William P. Perry (original piano score for 1970s showing on television)
- Production companies: D.W. Griffith, Inc.
- Distributed by: United Artists (US)
- Release date: December 28, 1921 (US)
- Running time: 150 min.
- Country: United States
- Languages: Silent; English intertitles
- Budget: $760,000
- Box office: $3 million (worldwide rental) or $2 million

Orphans of the Storm is a 1921 American silent melodrama film directed by D. W. Griffith and set in late-18th-century France, before and during the French Revolution.

The last Griffith film to feature both Lillian and Dorothy Gish, it was a commercial failure compared to his earlier works, such as The Birth of a Nation (1915), Broken Blossoms (1919) and Way Down East (1920).

Griffith used historical events to comment on contemporary events, in this case the French Revolution to warn about the rise of Bolshevism. The film is about class conflict and a polemic for "inter-class understanding" and against "destructive hatred". At one point, in front of the Committee of Public Safety, a main character pleads, "Yes I am an aristocrat, but a friend of the people."

The film is based on the 1874 French play Les Deux Orphelines by Adolphe d'Ennery and Eugène Cormon.

== Plot ==
Orphans of the Storm

Just before the French Revolution, Henriette takes her close adopted sister Louise to Paris in the hope of finding a cure for her blindness. She promises Louise that she will not marry until Louise can look upon her husband to approve him. Lustful aristocrat de Praille (whose carriage kills a child, enraging peasant father, Forget-not) meets the two outside Paris. Taken by the virginal Henriette's beauty, he has her abducted and brought to his estate where a lavish party is being held, leaving Louise helpless in the big city. An honorable aristocrat, the Chevalier de Vaudrey helps Henriette to escape de Praille and his guests by successfully fighting a duel with him. The scoundrel Mother Frochard, seeing an opportunity to make money, tricks Louise into her underground house to be kept prisoner. Unable to find Louise with the help of the Chevalier, Henriette rents a room, but before leaving her de Vaudrey comforts and kisses the distressed woman. Later, Henriette gives shelter to admirable politician Danton, who after an attack by Royalist spies following a public speech falls for her. As a result, she runs foul of the radical revolutionary Robespierre, a friend of Danton.

Mother Frochard forces Louise into begging. Meanwhile, de Vaudrey proposes to Henriette and she refuses. After expressing love for each other, he promises Henriette that Louise will be found. King Louis XVI orders Henriette to be arrested, due to his disapproval of de Vaudrey's choice of wife, and the Chevalier is also sent away while his aunt visits Henriette. During the meeting, Louise is heard singing outside, where Frochard has told her to walk blindly and sing. Henriette calls out from her upstairs balcony, but the panicked Louise is dragged off by Frochard and Henriette is arrested and sent to a women's prison.

Louise and Frochard's begging continues with the other two Frochards, and before long the Revolution begins. A battle between the Royalist soldiers and the people allied with the police, who are successful, results in aristocrats being killed and the prisoners of the "Tyrants" (including Henriette) being freed. A people's 'rag-tag' government is formed, and Forget-not takes his revenge against de Praille.

Robespierre and Forget-not send Henriette and her lover, the Chevalier de Vaudrey, to the guillotine, for hiding de Vaudrey, an aristocrat, who returned to Paris to find her. However, Danton manages to obtain a pardon for them. After a race through the streets of Paris he just manages to save Henriette and offers her to the Chevalier, when the two orphans unite. A doctor restores Louise's sight, she approves marriage between Henriette and the Chevalier, and a better-organized Republic forms in France.

== Cast ==
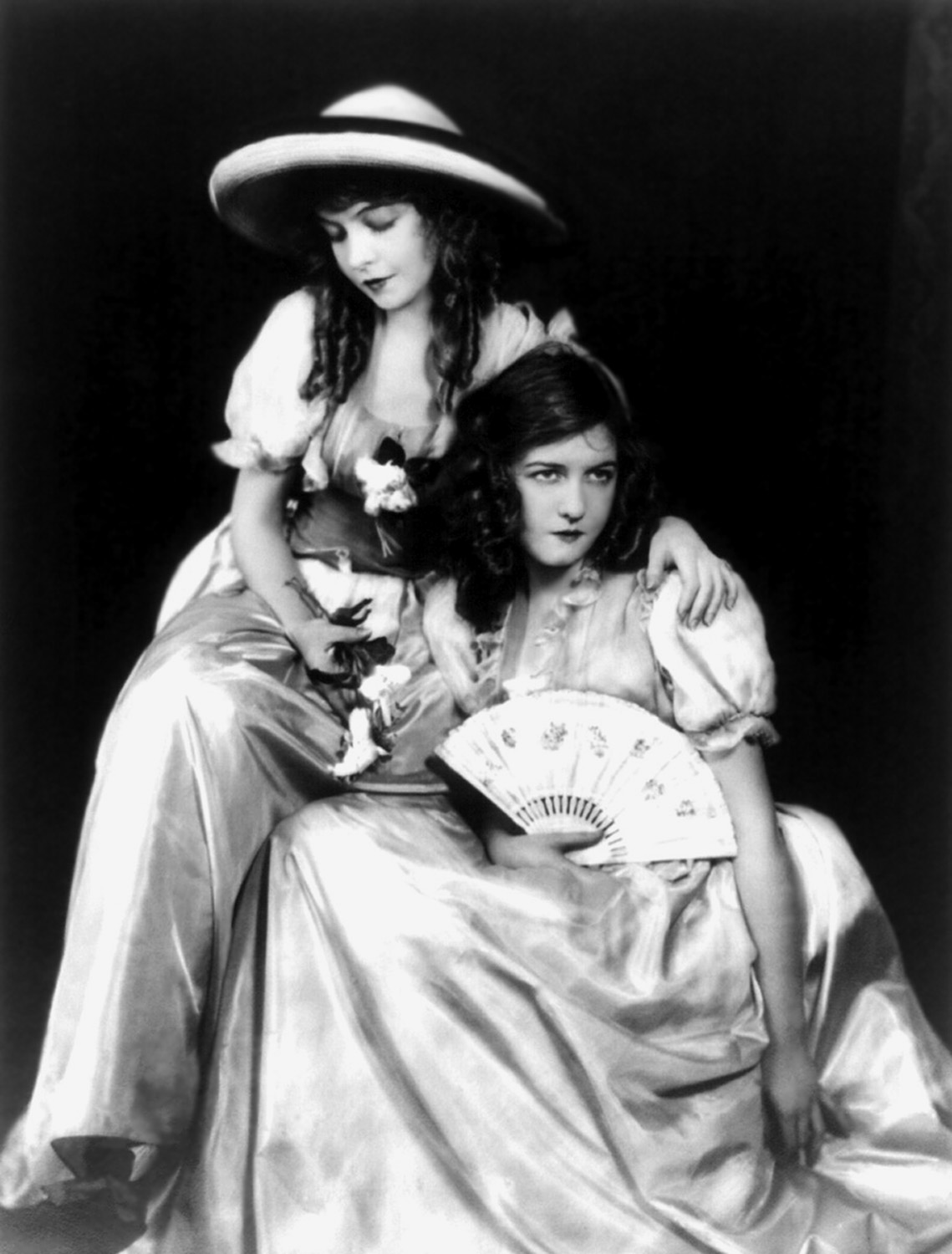
Dorothy and Lillian Gish in publicity photograph for film, 1921

- Lillian Gish as Henriette Girard
- Dorothy Gish as Louise
- Joseph Schildkraut as Chevalier de Vaudrey
- Frank Losee as Count de Linières
- Catherine Emmet as Countess de Linières
- Morgan Wallace as Marquis de Praille
- Lucille La Verne as Mother Frochard
- Frank Puglia as Pierre Frochard
- Sheldon Lewis as Jacques Frochard
- Creighton Hale as Picard
- Leslie King as Jacques-Forget-Not
- Monte Blue as Danton
- Sidney Herbert as Robespierre
- Lee Kohlmar as Louis XVI
- Marcia Harris as Henriette's landlady
- Adolph Lestina as doctor
- Kate Bruce as Sister Genevieve
- Flora Finch as starving peasant
- Louis Wolheim as executioner
- Kenny Delmar as the Chevalier, as a boy
- Fay Marbe as dancer

== Visual effects ==
"The familiar 'Last Minute Rescue' towards the end of Orphans in the Storm is as exciting and as beautifully executed as we have now come to expect of Griffith. Cutting between the guillotine and Henriette (Lillian Gish) and Danton (Monte Blue), racing on horseback with her pardon, the sequence is a perfect example of 'stretched action' in which the time taken for Gish to walk three paces in the completed sequence, now intercut with other action, takes twice or maybe three times as long. This serves to build the suspense inasmuch as it creates an almost unbearable sense of impatience." - Film historian Paul O'Dell in Griffith and the Rise of Hollywood (1970)

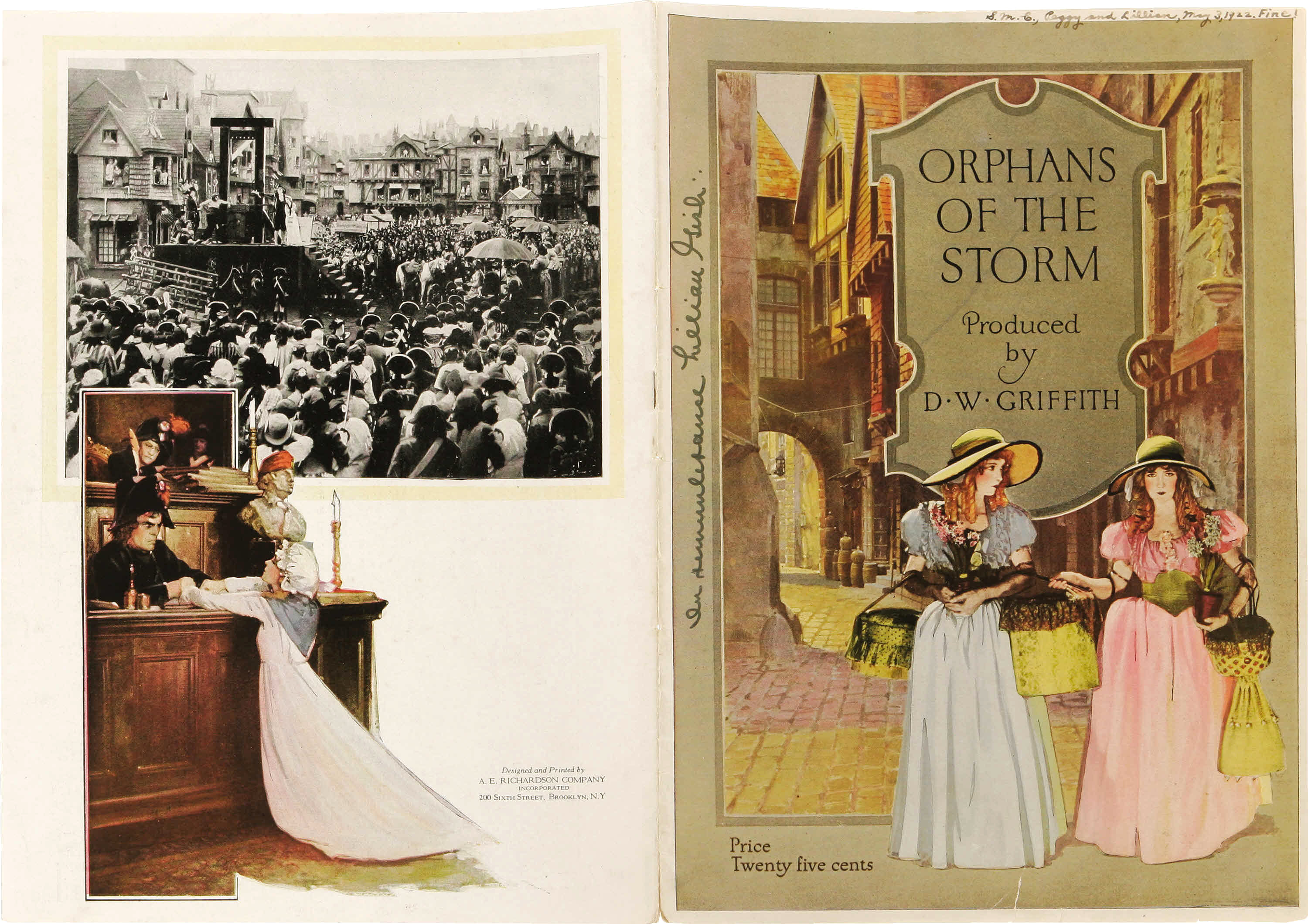
Production booklet cover

The movie uses several visual effects throughout to capture the emotion of its story, using monochromic filters of red, blue, green, yellow and sepia to show feeling with the silent action which is accompanied by music; the movie also uses fade-ins to achieve this effect.

== Background ==
The film is based on the 1874 French play Les Deux Orphelines by Adolphe d'Ennery and Eugène Cormon, which had been adapted for the American stage by N. Hart Jackson and Albert Marshman Palmer as The Two Orphans, premiering at Marshman Palmer's Union Square Theatre (58 E. 14th St.) in New York City in December 1874 with Kate Claxton as Louise. It had been filmed in the United States twice before Griffith did his film: in 1911 by Otis Turner and in 1915 by Herbert Brenon (the lost Theda Bara film The Two Orphans). The play had also been filmed twice in France in 1910: by Albert Capellani and by Georges Monca.

The Two Orphans, the English-language version of the play upon which the movie is based, had been a staple of the actress Kate Claxton. After the premiere at the original Union Square Theatre in 1874, she had performed it hundreds of times for various theatrical companies in New York, including the Brooklyn Theater (she was performing it there on the night of the infamous Brooklyn Theater Fire in 1876), and she had eventually acquired the US rights to the play.

In securing the film rights, Griffith had to wrangle with Claxton, who for unknown reasons seems to have been reluctant to allow the story to be filmed a third time. When Griffith completed his film for release, a rival German version of the story had been made (Claxton owned foreign film rights as well) and was being prepared for release in the US at the same time as Griffith's version. Griffith bought out the US distribution rights to the German version so that it could not conflict with the earning potential of his own film.

== Release ==
The film was originally released on 14 reels, although a 12-reel abridged version was made available to theaters a few months later.

Despite Griffith's reputation at the box office, the film was not a financial success.

== Critical reception ==
The New York Times wrote: "As the vivid scenes of the historically colored melodrama flashed one after another on the screen everyone surely felt that Griffith was himself again" but added "The seasoned spectator, no matter how he may let himself go, knows that every delay is a device to heighten the suspense and every advantage given the rescuers is calculated to evoke his cheers (...) whatever he does, he is not surprised when the girl is saved".

In a retrospective review, Pauline Kael described it as an epic spectacle, "a marvellous, expensively produced mixture of melodrama and sentimentality, with duels, kidnappings, the storming of the Bastille, and Lillian Gish being saved from the guillotine." She made the assessment that it was "not one of Griffith's greatest", but it nonetheless contains memorable sequences of "theatrical sublimity".

On the review aggregator website Rotten Tomatoes, 88% of 17 critics' reviews are positive.

== In popular culture ==
In the 1960 Spike Jones parody recording "The Late Late Late Movies" (Liberty F-55191), "Billy Playtex" announces the night's feature as "Orphans of the Storm, starring the Gish Sisters! And introducing, Elmo Lincoln!" (Lincoln did not actually appear in the film.) This reflected the contemporary practice among movie studios, limiting features aired on TV to very old movies (even forty-year-old silent pictures).

== Sources ==
- Appelbaum, Stanley (1983). Great Actors and Actresses of the American Stage in Historic Photographs: 332 Portraits From 1850-1950. ISBN 9780486245553.
