= Roberto Rodríguez (director) =

Mexican film director

Roberto Rodríguez Ruelas (7 January 1909 – 4 April 1995) was a Mexican film director, born in Mexico City. Brothers Roberto and Joselito Rodríguez were working in Hollywood as sound engineers in 1931 when Mexican President Pascual Ortiz Rubio, on an official visit to the city of Los Angeles, came to hear of their work and personally invited them to return to Mexico to film a sound-movie using the brothers' sound system. The result was the film Santa, 1932.

== Selected filmography ==
- Santa (1932)
- I Will Live Again (1940)
- The Woman I Lost (1949)
- The Two Orphans (1950)
- ¡Que bravas son las costeñas! (1955)
- The Seven Girls (1955)
- Spring in the Heart (1956)
- El diario de mi madre (1958)
- Puss in Boots (1961)
- La Bandida (1962)
