= The Two Orphans (1915 film) =

1915 film

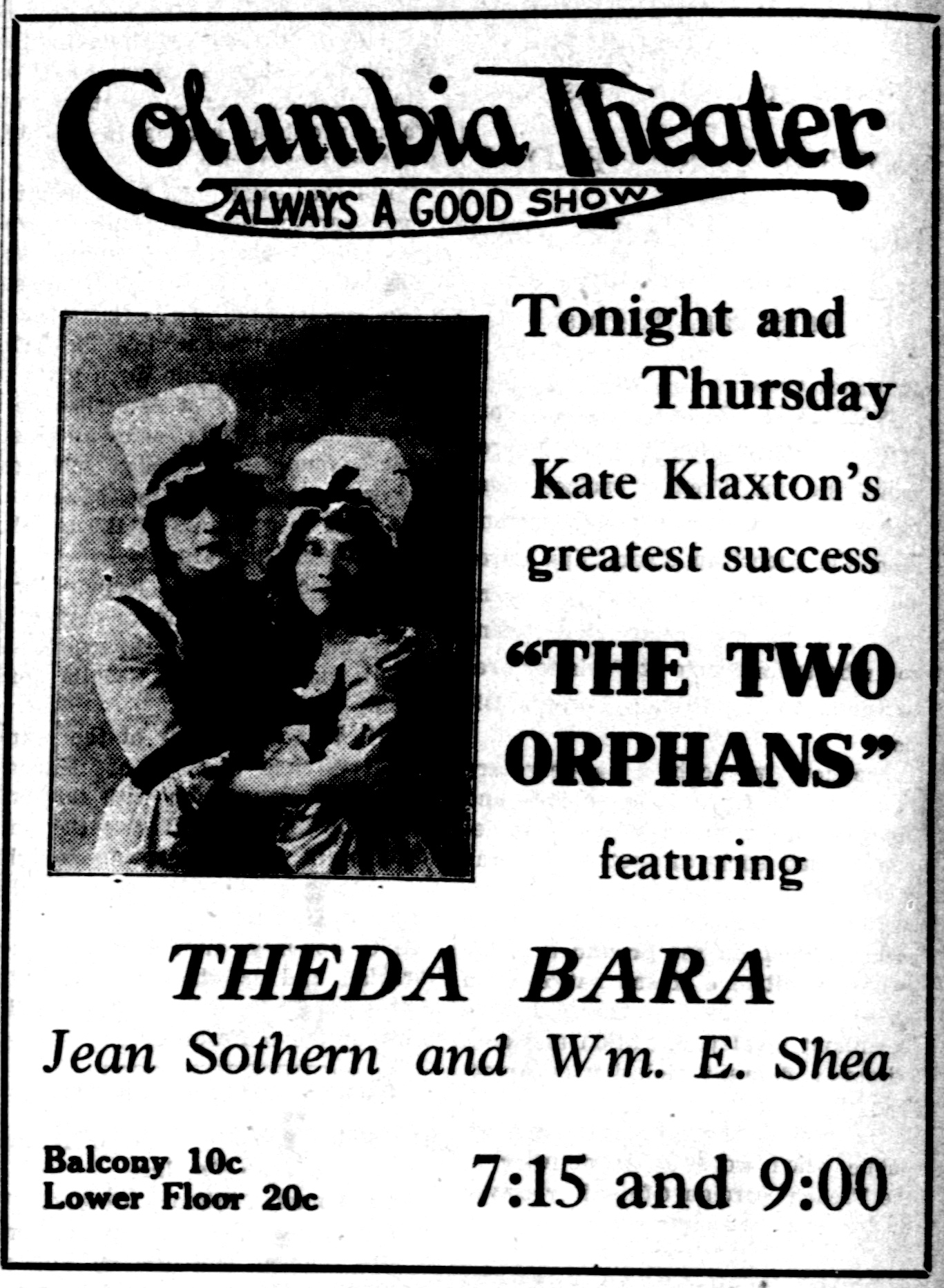
- Newspaper advertisement
- Directed by: Herbert Brenon
- Written by: Herbert Brenon
- Based on: Les deux orphelines by Adolphe d'Ennery and Eugène Cormon
- Starring: Theda Bara
- Cinematography: Phil Rosen
- Distributed by: Fox Film Corporation
- Release date: September 5, 1915
- Country: United States
- Languages: Silent; English intertitles

The Two Orphans is a 1915 American silent romantic drama film directed by Herbert Brenon and starring Theda Bara. This film was based on the 1872 French play Les deux orphelines, by Adolphe D'Ennery and Eugene Cormon which was translated into English by N. Hart Jackson. It was the play that was being performed at the time the Brooklyn Theater Fire broke out. The film was made by Fox Film Corporation and was partially shot on location in Québec, Canada. It is now considered to be lost.

In 1921 D. W. Griffith made a second adaptation of the play, Orphans of the Storm, starring Dorothy Gish and Lillian Gish.

== Cast ==
- Theda Bara as Henriette
- Jean Sothern as Louise
- William E. Shay as Chevalier de Vaudrey
- Herbert Brenon as Pierre
- Gertrude Berkeley as Mother Frochard
- Frank Goldsmith as Marquis de Presles
- E. L. Fernandez as Jacques
- Sheridan Block as Count de Liniere
- Mrs. Cecil Raleigh as Countess De Liniere

== See also ==
- List of lost films
