= The Two Orphans (1976 film) =

- Directed by: Leopoldo Savona
- Written by: Adolphe d'Ennery (play); Eugène Cormon (play); Eduardo Manzanos Brochero
- Produced by: Robert Chabert; Angelo Rizzoli
- Starring: Isabella Savona; Patrizia Gori; Andrés Resino
- Cinematography: Julio Ortas
- Edited by: Otello Colangeli
- Music by: Stelvio Cipriani
- Production companies: Francinex; Rizzoli Film
- Release date: 1976
- Running time: 90 minutes
- Countries: Italy; Spain
- Language: Italian

The Two Orphans (Italian: Le due orfanelle, Spanish: Las dos huerfanitas) is a 1976 Italian-Spanish historical drama film directed by Leopoldo Savona and starring Isabella Savona, Patrizia Gori and Andrés Resino. It is based on the play The Two Orphans by Adolphe d'Ennery and Eugène Cormon.

== Cast ==
- Isabella Savona as Mariana
- Patrizia Gori as Louisa
- Andrés Resino as Ruggero
- Alfredo Pea as Pedro
- Luis Suárez
- Veronica Sava
- Stelio Candelli as The Count
- Ida Galli as The Countess
- Anna Maestri
- Paolo Celli
- Alessandro Perrella
- Miguel del Castillo
- Bruno Arié
- Vittorio Fanfoni
- José Canalejas

== Bibliography ==
- Klossner, Michael. The Europe of 1500-1815 on Film and Television. McFarland, 2002.
