= A. M. Palmer (theater manager) =

American theatrical manager (1838–1905)

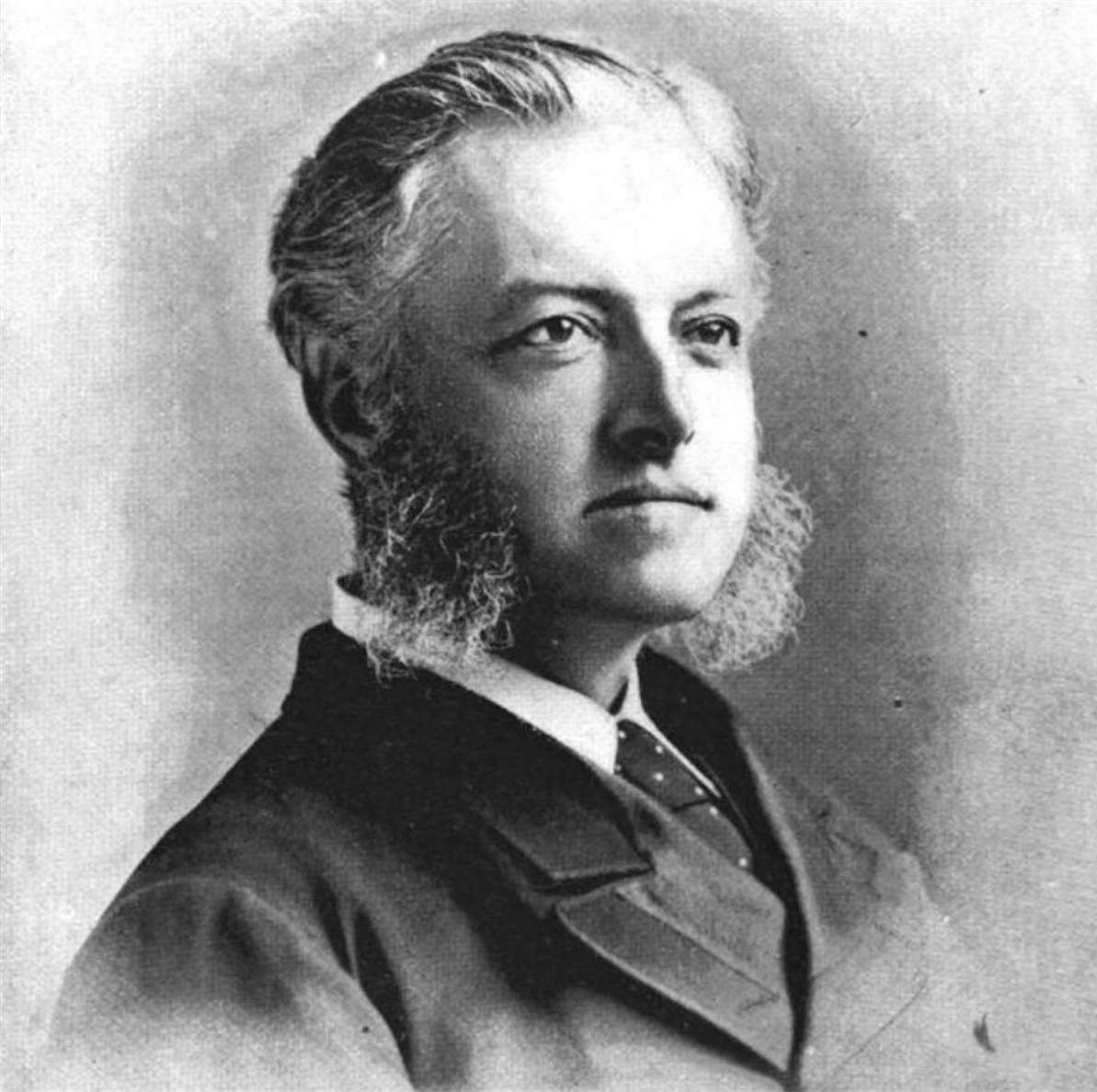
- Born: Albert Marshman Palmer; July 27, 1838; North Stonington, Connecticut, U.S.
- Died: March 7, 1905 (aged 66); New York City, U.S.
- Education: New York University
- Occupation: Theatrical manager

Albert Marshman Palmer (July 27, 1838 – March 7, 1905) was an American theatrical manager. He was universally known in the theatrical world by his initials A. M. Palmer.

== Biography ==
Albert Marshman Palmer was born in North Stonington, Connecticut on July 27, 1838. He graduated from the law school of the University of New York in 1860, served as librarian at the Mercantile Library, New York, in 1869–72, and then for ten years managed the Union Square Theatre. After traveling in Europe he returned to New York in 1884 and then took charge of the Madison Square Theatre and later also of Palmer's Theatre at Broadway and Thirtieth Street. Richard Mansfield for a time appeared under his management, as well as Clara Morris, Evelyn Campbell, and many other notable stage people who played in his famous stock companies. His traveling companies made the plays Jim the Penman, Saints and Sinners, A Pair of Spectacles, and Elaine known throughout the country. Among the playwrights whom he encouraged were Bronson Howard, G. F. Rowe, Steele Mackaye, W. D. Howells, and Brander Matthews. For 14 years, Palmer was the president of the Actors' Fund of America, which he originated in 1882. He was a founding member of the Players.

He died in New York City on March 7, 1905.
