= The Two Orphans (play) =

Play by Adolphe d'Ennery and Eugène Cormon

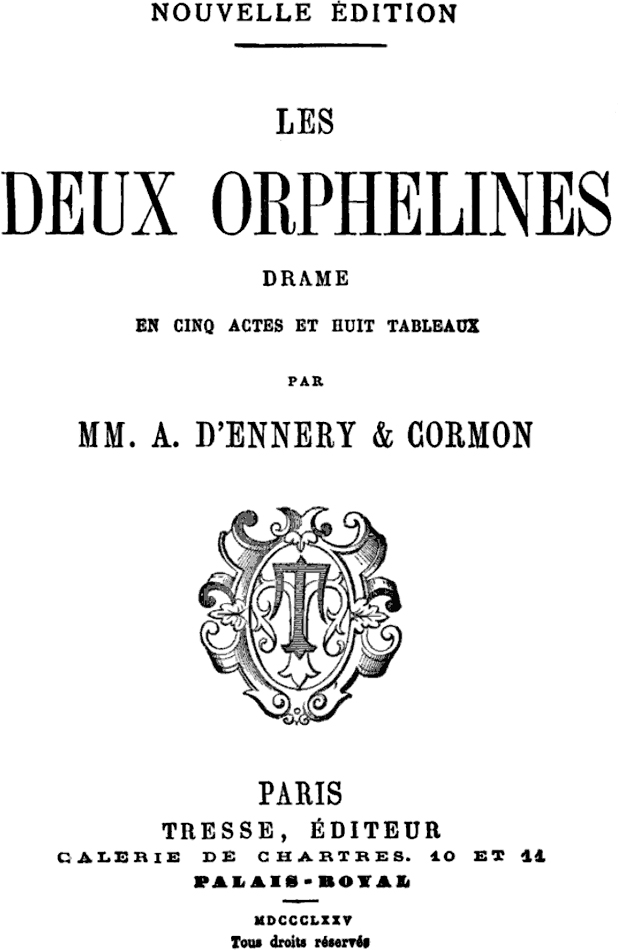

The Two Orphans (French: 'Les Deux orphelines') is a historical play by the French writers Adolphe d'Ennery and Eugène Cormon. It premiered on 20 January 1874 at the Théâtre de la Porte Saint-Martin in Paris. A melodrama set during the French Revolution, it takes place in five acts.

== In the United States ==
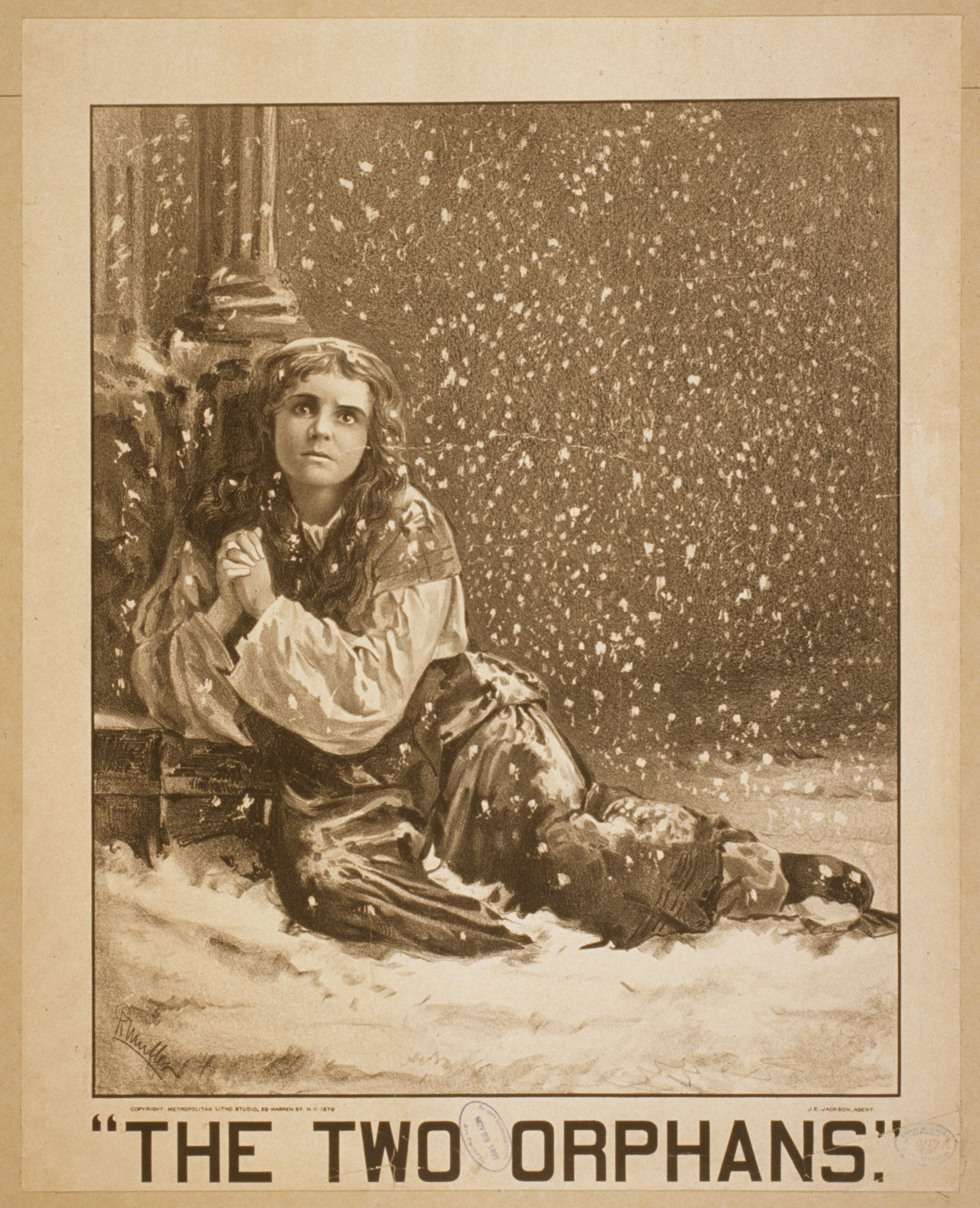
1879 poster for The Two Orphans

The play as translated by Hart Jackson into English was expressly adapted for Sheldon Shook's Union Square Theatre then under the management of A.M. Palmer. Its American premiere came on December 21, 1874, played for 180 performances, and eventually proved to be one of the most performed melodramas in the country for the next few decades. Odell's Annals of the New York Stage called it "one of the greatest theatrical successes of all time in America." Kate Claxton made her career in the role of Louise, and she later purchased the performance rights to the play and played it widely for years. It was also the play being performed during the December 1876 Brooklyn Theatre fire that killed at least 278 people.

The play was revived on Broadway in 1904 (56 performances) and 1926 (32 performances). It was also adapted to film at least four times during the silent film era starting in 1908.

== Original Broadway production ==
=== Synopsis of Scenes ===
Hart Jackson adapted the original French five-act melodrama into four acts and seven tableaux (scenes) for the Union Square Theatre. The tableaux were:

- Tableau 1: Place Pont Neuf
- Tableau 2: Illuminated Terrace and Garden at Bel Air near Paris
- Tableau 3: Private Office of the Minister of Police
- Tableau 4: Place St. Sulpice
- Tableau 5: Henriette's Lodgings
- Tableau 6: Courtyard of the Prison of La Salpetriere
- Tableau 7: Boat House on the Bank of the River Seine

=== Original 1874 Broadway cast ===
- Kate Claxton as Louise
- Kitty Blanchard as Henriette
- Rose Eytinge as Marianne, an outcast
- Charles R. Thorne Jr. as Chevalier de Vaudry
- Ida Vernon as Sister Genevieve
- Marie Wilkins as La Frochard
- John Parselle as Count de Linieres, Minister of Police
- Stuart Robson as Picard, valet to DeVaudry
- McKee Rankin as Jaques Frochard, an outlaw
- F. F. Mackay as Pierre Frochard, a cripple
- Ella Burns as Victorine
- Roberta Norwood as Julie
- Kate Holland as Florette
- Hattie Thorpe as Sister Therese

=== Original 1874 Broadway production credits ===
- Director - John Parselle
- Set Design - R. Marston
- Music - H. Tissington
- Costumes - T. W. Lanouette
- Lighting - Charles Murray
- Properties - W. Henry

== Adaptations ==
The play has been turned into many other works including an 1877 novel written by the same authors, an 1878 Portuguese opera, D.W. Griffith's 1921 film Orphans of the Storm, and numerous other films.
