= List of Italian films of 1956 =

A list of films produced in Italy in 1956 (see 1956 in film):

Title	Director	Cast	Genre	Notes
1956
Accadde di notte	Gian Paolo Callegari, Franco Concini	Roberto Risso, Domenico Modugno		
Adventure in Capri				
Agguato sul mare	Pino Mercanti	Ettore Manni, Maria Frau		
Alone in the Streets				
Amaramente	Luigi Capuano	Otello Toso, Lia Cancellieri		
Arriva la zia d'America	Roberto Bianchi Montero	Tina Pica, Dante Maggio	Comedy	
Bambini al cinema	Francesco Maselli		Documentary	
Beatrice Cenci	Riccardo Freda	Micheline Presle, Gino Cervi	Historical	
Calabuch	Luis Garcia Berlanga	Edmund Gwenn, Valentina Cortese, Franco Fabrizi	Comedy	
Cantando sotto le stelle	Marino Girolami	Johnny Dorelli, Alessandra Panaro	Musical comedy	
Casta diva	Carmine Gallone	Antonella Lualdi, Nadia Gray	Opera	
Cela s'appelle l'aurore	Luis Buñuel	Georges Marchal, Lucia Bosè		French/Italian co-production
Ci sposeremo a Capri	Siro Marcellini	Tina Pica, Enzo Turco		
Ciao, pais...				
Città di notte	Leopoldo Trieste	Nuri Neva Sangro, Adriana Asti	Drama	
Contadini del mare	Vittorio De Sica			
Continenti in fiamme	Alessandro Ronzon			
Costruzioni meccaniche Riva	Ermanno Olmi		Documentary	
The Courier of Moncenisio	Guido Brignone	Roldano Lupi, Virna Lisi	Historical drama	
Defilè				
Difendo il mio amore	Giulio Macchi	Martine Carol, Gabriele Ferzetti, Alan Furlan	Drama	
Don Juan	John Berry	Fernandel, Carmen Sevilla	Comedy	French/Italian/Spanish film
Donatella	Mario Monicelli	Elsa Martinelli, Alan Furlan		Entered into the 6th Berlin International Film Festival
Donne, amori e matrimoni	Roberto Bianchi Montero	Giuseppe Porelli, Memmo Carotenuto	Comedy	
Due sosia in allegria	Ignazio Ferronetti	Memmo Carotenuto, Scilla Gabel	Comedy	
El expreso de Andalucía	Francisco Rovira Beleta	Jorge Mistral, Marisa De Leza	Drama	Italian/Spanish co-production
Elena and Her Men	Jean Renoir	Ingrid Bergman, Jean Marais, Mel Ferrer		French/Italian co-production
Era di venerdì 17	Mario Soldati	Fernandel, Giulia Rubini	Comedy drama	
Falstaff				
Gervaise				
Giovanni dalle Bande Nere	Sergio Grieco	Vittorio Gassman, Constance Smith	Adventure	
Gli harem sono deserti	Antonio Colacurci			
Gli occhi senza luce				
Gli orizzonti del sole				
Goubbiah, mon amour	Robert Darène	Jean Marais, Kerima	Romance	French/Italian co-production
Guardia, guardia scelta, brigadiere e maresciallo	Mauro Bolognini	Aldo Fabrizi, Alberto Sordi	Comedy	
Helen of Troy	Robert Wise	Rossana Podestà, Jacques Sernas	Epic	American/Italian/French co-production
Honey degli uomini perduti	Enzo Della Santa	Katia Loritz, Franco Balducci		
The Hunchback of Notre Dame	Jean Delannoy	Gina Lollobrigida, Anthony Quinn		French/Italian co-production
I calunniatori	Franco Cirino; Mario Volpe	Achille Togliani, Antonella Galliano	Drama	
I giorni più belli	Mario Mattoli	Franco Interlenghi, Vittorio De Sica	Comedy	
I girovaghi	Hugo Fregonese	Peter Ustinov, Carla Del Poggio	Drama	
I miliardari	Guido Malatesta	Mike Bongiorno, Giulia Rubini	Drama	
I vagabondi delle stelle	Nino Stresa	Terence Hill, Brunella Bovo		
Il bigamo	Luciano Emmer	Marcello Mastroianni, Franca Valeri	Comedy	
Il canto dell'emigrante				
Il cavaliere dalla spada nera	Luigi Capuano; Ladislao Kish	Marina Berti, Steve Barclay	Adventure	
Il cero				
Il delitto Mateotti				
Il ferroviere	Pietro Germi	Pietro Germi, Luisa Della Noce	Drama	
Il Giglio infranto				
Il monello del porto	Emile Couzinet	Piero Giagnoni, Fausto Tozzi		
Il più grande mistero d'amore				
Il ponte dell'universo				
Il sogno dello zio				
Il suo più grande amore	Antonio Leonviola	Nuri Neva Sangro, Rolf Tasna		
Il Tetto (The Roof)	Vittorio De Sica	Gabriella Pallotta, Giorgio Listuzzi	Pink neorrealism	Cannes Award. Nastro d'Argento best script
Io, Caterina				
Kean	Vittorio Gassman	Vittorio Gassman, Eleonora Rossi Drago	Biopic	
L'alfiere	Anton Giulio Majano	Monica Vitti, Nino Manfredi		Film serial
L'angelo del peccato				
L'homme et l'enfant	Raoul Andre	Eddie Constantine, Juliette Gréco	Crime thriller	
L'incredibile attesa	Mino Loy			
L'intrusa	Raffaello Matarazzo	Amedeo Nazzari, Lea Padovani	Melodrama	
La banda degli onesti	Camillo Mastrocinque	Totò, Peppino De Filippo	Comedy	
La Canzone proibita	Flavio Calzavara	Claudio Villa, Fiorella Mari		
La capinera del mulino	Angio Vane	Marisa Belli, Franco Andrei		
La châtelaine du Liban	Richard Pottier	Jean-Claude Pascal, Omar Sharif	Thriller	French/Italian co-production
La donna del giorno	Francesco Maselli	Virna Lisi, Antonio Cifariello	Drama	
La donna più bella del mondo	Robert Z. Leonard	Gina Lollobrigida, Vittorio Gassman	Drama	
La foire aux femmes				
La fortuna di essere donna	Alessandro Blasetti	Sophia Loren, Charles Boyer	Comedy	
La grande barriera				
La risaia	Raffaello Matarazzo	Elsa Martinelli, Folco Lulli	Melodrama	
La sonnambula				
La sorcière	Michel Andre	Marina Vlady		
La traversée de Paris	Claude Autant-Lara	Jean Gabin, Bourvil	Comedy drama	French/Italian co-production
La trovatella di Milano	Giorgio Capitani	Massimo Serato, Franca Marzi	Historical	
La vita che ti diedi				
La voce che uccide				
Lauta mancia				
Le long des trottoirs	Leonide Moguy	Anne Vernon, François Guérin		
The Silent World	Jacques-Yves Cousteau		Documentary	French/Italian co-production
Le secret de soeur Angèle	Leo Joannon	Sophie Desmarets, Raf Vallone		
Les possédées				
Lo sbaglio di essere vivi				
Lo spadaccino misterioso	Sergio Grieco	Frank Latimore, Fiorella Mari	Crime	
Lo svitato	Carlo Lizzani	Dario Fo, Franca Rame	Comedy	
Londra chiama Polo Nord	Duilio Coletti	Curd Jurgens, Dawn Addams		
Love	Horst Hächler	Maria Schell, Raf Vallone, Eva Kotthaus	Drama	Co-production with West Germany
Mai ti scorderò	Giuseppe Guarino	Paolo Carlini, Jacqueline Collard	Drama	
Mamma sconosciuta	Carlo Campogalliani	Janet Vidor, Alberto Farnese	Comedy	
Manon: Finestra 2	Ermanno Olmi		Documentary	
Marie Antoinette Queen of France	Jean Delannoy	Michèle Morgan, Richard Todd	Historical	French/Italian co-production
Maruzzella	Luigi Capuano	Marisa Allasio, Massimo Serato	Romance	
Mi permette, babbo!	Mario Bonnard	Aldo Fabrizi, Alberto Sordi	Comedy	
Mi tío Jacinto	Ladislao Vajda	Pablito Calvo, Jose Marco Davo	Drama	
Michel Strogoff	Carmine Gallone	Curd Jürgens, Geneviève Page, Sylva Koscina	Adventure	Co-production with France
Michelino 1A B	Ermanno Olmi		Documentary	
Mio figlio Nerone	Steno	Alberto Sordi, Vittorio De Sica; Gloria Swanson, Brigitte Bardot	Comedy	
Moglie e buoi	Leonardo De Mitri	Clelia Matania, Enrico Viarisio		
Napoli sole mio!	Giorgio Simonelli	Maurizio Arena, Lorella De Luca		
Noi siamo le colonne	Luigi Filippo D'Amico	Vittorio De Sica, Franco Fabrizi	Comedy drama	
Paradiso terrestre	Luciano Emmer		Documentary	
Paris, Palace Hôtel	Henri Verneuil	Charles Boyer, Françoise Arnoul	Romantic comedy	French/Italian co-production
Parma città d'oro				
Pasqua in Sicilia	Vittorio De Sica		Documentary	
Peccato di castità	Gianni Franciolini	Giovanna Ralli, Antonio Cifariello	Comedy	
Per le vie della città				
Piazza San Marco				
Piccoli amici	Hans Albin	Oliver Grimm, Anne-Marie Blanc	Drama	Italian/West German co-production
Porta un bacione a Firenze	Camillo Mastrocinque	Milly Vitale, Alberto Farnese	Comedy	
Questi ragazzi				
Ragazze al mare	Giuliano Biagetti	Miriam Romei, Piero Vaccari	Comedy	
The Railroad Man (Il Ferroviere)	Pietro Germi	Pietro Germi, Sylva Koscina, Luisa Della Noce	Drama	3 awards won at San Sebastián International Film Festival. Cannes Award
Retaggio di sangue	Max Calandri	Anna Di Lorenzo, Roberto Mauri		
Risveglio	Raffaele Andreassi		Documentary	
Roland the Mighty	Pietro Francisci	Rik Battaglia, Rosanna Schiaffino	—N/a	
San Remo canta	Domenico Paolella		Documentary	
Sangue di zingara	Maria Basaglia	Maria Piazzai, Eloisa Cianni	Drama	
Scacco matto	Carlo Campogalliani	Oreste Bilancia, Carlo Campogalliani		
Serenata al vento	Luigi Lattini De Marchi	Bianca Maria Ferrari, Nerio Bernardi	Comedy	
Serenata per sedici bionde	Marino Girolami	Claudio Villa, Esther Masing	Musical comedy	
Sette canzoni per sette sorelle	Marino Girolami	Claudio Villa, Enio Girolami	Musical comedy	
Si tous les gars du monde	Christian-Jaque	Helene Perdriere, Jean-Louis Trintignant		
Siamo tutti necessari				
Storia di una minorenne	Piero Costa	Nino Marchesini, Irene Genna	Drama	
Sulle strade di notte				
Supreme Confession	Sergio Corbucci	Anna Maria Ferrero, Massimo Serato, Sonja Ziemann	Drama	Co-production with West Germany
Tempo di villeggiatura	Antonio Racioppi	Vittorio De Sica, Giovanna Ralli	Comedy	
Terrore sulla città	Anton Giulio Majano	Maria Fiore	Drama	
Tides of Passion	Jean Stelli	Etchika Choureau, Jean Danet, Dora Doll	Drama	Co-production with France
Tormento d'amore	Eduardo Manzanos Brochero	Märta Torén, Massimo Serato		
Tosca	Carmine Gallone	Franca Duval, Franco Corelli	Musical	
Totò, lascia o raddoppia?	Camillo Mastrocinque	Totò, Dorian Gray	Comedy	
Totò, Peppino e i... fuorilegge	Camillo Mastrocinque	Totò, Peppino De Filippo	Comedy	
Totò, Peppino e... la malafemmina	Camillo Mastrocinque	Totò, Peppino De Filippo	Comedy	
Turchia				
Un traje blanco	Rafael Gil	Miguel Gil, Julia Martínez	Drama	Italian/Spanish co-production
Una voce una chitarra e un pò di luna				
Une fée... pas comme les autres				
Uomini e lupi	Giuseppe De Santis	Silvana Mangano, Yves Montand, Pedro Armendáriz	Drama	
Vertigine bianca	Giorgio Ferroni			
Vous pigez				
War and Peace	King Vidor	Audrey Hepburn, Henry Fonda		American/Italian co-production
We're All Necessary	Jose Antonio Nieves Conde	Alberto Closas, Folco Lulli	Drama	Italian/Spanish co-production
What a Woman!	Alessandro Blasetti	Sophia Loren, Marcello Mastroianni, Charles Boyer	Comedy-Drama	
Women's Club	Ralph Habib	Nicole Courcel, Dany Carrel	Drama	French/Italian co-production

== See also ==
- 1956 in Italian television
