= Revenge of a Crazy Girl =

1951 film

- Film poster
- Directed by: Pino Mercanti
- Written by: Alberto Vecchietti; Gaspare Cataldo
- Produced by: Fortunato Misiano
- Starring: Lída Baarová
- Cinematography: Giuseppe La Torre
- Music by: Gino Filippini
- Distributed by: Siden Film
- Release date: 25 November 1951
- Country: Italy
- Language: Italian

Revenge of a Crazy Girl (Italian: La vendetta di una pazza) is a 1951 Italian historical melodrama film written and directed by Pino Mercanti. It is loosely based on the novel La vendetta di una pazza written by Carolina Invernizio.

== Cast ==
- Lída Baarová as Paola Micheli
- Otello Toso as Carlo
- Mino Doro as Rodolfo Micheli
- Jacqueline Plessis as Gianna
- Brunella Bovo as Anna Maria Micheli
- Gino Leurini as Stefano
- Paola Quattrini as Young Anna Maria Micheli
- Margherita Nicosia as Amalia
- Mirko Ellis as Andrea
- Olinto Cristina as Paola Micheli's father
- Ignazio Balsamo
