= Dina De Santis =

Italian actress (1932–1985)

- Born: Bernina De Santis; 21 October 1932; Ronciglione, Viterbo, Kingdom of Italy
- Died: 4 December 1985 (aged 53); Rome, Italy
- Occupation: Actress

Bernina De Santis (21 October 1932 – 4 December 1985) was an Italian actress.

== Life and career ==
Born in Ronciglione, as a child De Santis won a beauty contest and at young age she started working for the advertising industry and on stage. She made her film debut in 1954 in the melodrama Lacrime d'amore directed by Pino Mercanti, who suggested her stage name. She was very active in adventure films, Spaghetti Westerns, peplum and Eurospy films, sometimes credited as Dina De Saint. She retired from acting in the late 1960s.

De Santis died in Rome on 4 December 1985, at the age of 53.

== Selected filmography ==
- Tears of Love (1954)
- Vendicata! (1955)
- The Knight of the Black Sword (1956)
- Venice, the Moon and You (1958)
- Knight of 100 Faces (1960)
- Queen of the Seas (1961)
- The Secret of the Black Falcon (1961)
- The Black Duke (1963)
- Hercules and the Masked Rider (1963)
- Gentlemen of the Night (1964)
- Hercules Against Rome (1964)
- 008: Operation Exterminate (1965)
- Giant of the Evil Island (1965)
- Three Dollars of Lead (1965)
- Super Seven Calling Cairo (1965)
- Last Man to Kill (1966)
- Assault on the State Treasure (1967)
