= Queen of the Seas =

1961 film

- Directed by: Umberto Lenzi
- Screenplay by: Ugo Guerra; Luciano Martino; Ernesto Gastaldi
- Produced by: Fortunato Misiano
- Starring: Lisa Gastoni; Jerome Courtland; Walt Barnes; Agostino Salvietti
- Cinematography: Augusto Tiezzi
- Edited by: Jolanda Benvenuti
- Music by: Gino Filippini
- Production companies: Romana Film; Societe Nouvelle de Cinematographie
- Release date: 1 December 1961 (Italy)
- Running time: 87 minutes
- Countries: Italy; France

Queen of the Seas (Italian: Le avventure di Mary Read) is a 1961 adventure film directed by Umberto Lenzi and starring Lisa Gastoni and Jerome Courtland.

== Cast ==
- Lisa Gastoni as Mary Read
- Jerome Courtland as Peter Goodwin
- Walter Barnes as Captain Poof
- Agostino Salvietti as Mangiatrippa
- Germano Longo as Ivan
- Gianni Solaro as Governor of Florida
- Tullio Altamura as Don Pedro Alvarez
- Gisella Arden as The French Dancer
- Dina De Santis as Peter's Lover
- Ignazio Balsamo as Captain of the Guards
- Anna Arena as Lady in the Diligence
- Giulio Battiferri as Prison Guard
- Edoardo Toniolo as Lord Goodwin
- Piero Pastore as Master of Protocol
- Loris Gizzi as The Director of the Prison
- Bruno Scipioni as Lord Stewart

== Release ==
Queen of the Seas was released theatrically in Italy on December 1, 1961. It was released in the United States in 1964. It has received a home video release by Something Weird.

== Reception ==
In a contemporary review, the Monthly Film Bulletin reviewed a 62-minute dubbed version under the title Hell Below Deck. The review described the film as a "spiritless pirate melodrama" and noted "poorly photographed settings" and the swordplay, intrigues, and love scenes are "all equally uninteresting."
