= Carcerato =

Carcerato may refer to:

- Carcerato (1951 film)
- Carcerato (1981 film)
