= Orphan of the Ghetto =

- French film poster
- Directed by: Carlo Campogalliani
- Written by: Carlo Campogalliani; Ezio D'Errico; Piero De Bernardi; Carolina Invernizio (novel); Emerico Papp
- Produced by: Leopoldo Imperiali
- Cinematography: Arturo Gallea
- Edited by: Loris Bellero
- Music by: Giovanni Fusco
- Production company: Ambra
- Distributed by: Variety Distribution
- Release date: 1954
- Running time: 89 minutes
- Country: Italy
- Language: Italian

Orphan of the Ghetto (Italian: L'orfana del ghetto) is a 1954 Italian historical melodrama film directed by Carlo Campogalliani. It is based on a novel of the same name by Carolina Invernizio.

== Cast ==
- Franca Marzi
- Luisella Boni as Viola
- Anna Arena
- Renato Baldini
- Alberto Farnese
- Carlos Lamas
- Barbara Leite
- Carlo Lombardi
- Nino Marchetti
- Floriana Mulas
- Nico Pepe
- Letizia Quaranta
- Domenico Serra

== Bibliography ==
- Goble, Alan. The Complete Index to Literary Sources in Film. Walter de Gruyter, 1999.
