= The Beggar's Daughter =

- Film poster
- Directed by: Carlo Campogalliani
- Written by: Carlo Campogalliani; Carolina Invernizio (novel); Anton Giulio Majano; Mario Massa
- Produced by: Ferruccio Biancini
- Starring: Paola Barbara; Franca Maj; Steve Barclay
- Cinematography: Fernando Risi
- Edited by: Mario Serandrei
- Music by: Franco Casavola
- Production company: Excelsior Film
- Distributed by: Megale Film
- Release date: 2 September 1950
- Running time: 93 minutes
- Country: Italy
- Language: Italian

The Beggar's Daughter (Italian: La figlia del mendicante) is a 1950 Italian historical melodrama film directed by Carlo Campogalliani and starring Paola Barbara, Franca Maj and Steve Barclay. It is based on a novel of the same name by Carolina Invernizio.

== Plot ==
1860. In a villa in Naples, a foreign lady was killed: a poor beggar without one arm, Paolo, was accused of the crime, although innocent, he was sentenced to twenty years. The poor man's daughter, Anna, has worked in vain in favor of her father: she has only obtained the moral support of Franco, the son of the judge who sentenced Paolo. Franco, who is the leader of a group of patriots, partisans of Garibaldi, investigates the murder on his behalf and is induced to suspect his brother-in-law Giorgio, chief of police and the ex-maid of the murdered woman, who now is at Giorgio's service.

Meanwhile Anna, threatened by her stepmother, who tries to market the girl, saves herself with the help of another patriot. Franco entrusts Anna with the management of a flower shop, which serves as a meeting place for her friends. On the eve of the Garibaldi's entry into Naples, Giorgio has Franco arrested, who is then freed by the patriots. When the insurrection broke out, the doors of the prisons opened. Giorgio is killed by the maid, the only witness to his crime, whom he had arrested. Happy Anna and Franco go to free Paolo.

== Cast ==
- Paola Barbara as Fanny, amante di Giorgio
- Franca Maj as Anna
- Steve Barclay as Franco
- Renato Valente as Giorgio
- Jole Fierro as Lelia
- Ave Ninchi as Marisa, la governante di Anna
- Domenico Serra
- Nico Pepe
- Amina Pirani Maggi
- Nino Marchesini
- Carlo Chiesini
- Franco Pesce
- Umberto Silvestri
- Alfredo Varelli
- Jody Desmond
- Ciro Berardi
- Gustavo Serena
- Piero Pastore
- Pina Gallini
- Franco Jamonte
- Attilio Torelli
- Mauro Serra
- Leopoldo Valentini
- Clara Auteri

== Bibliography ==
- Goble, Alan. The Complete Index to Literary Sources in Film. Walter de Gruyter, 1999.
