= Il Conte di Matera =

1958 Italian adventure film

- Directed by: Luigi Capuano
- Written by: Vincenzo Talarico
- Story by: Raffaele Dettole
- Produced by: Fortunato Misiano
- Starring: Virna Lisi; Otello Toso
- Cinematography: Augusto Tiezzi
- Music by: Michele Cozzoli
- Production company: Romana Film
- Release date: May 8, 1958
- Country: Italy
- Language: Italian

Il Conte di Matera (lit. The Count of Matera) is a 1958 Italian adventure film directed by Luigi Capuano and starring Virna Lisi and Otello Toso.

== Synopsis ==
Rambaldo Tramontana is the protagonist; a count who went into battle backed by the French. He returns to Matera to take revenge once he is victorious, but the city is deserted and he begins to commit abuses and violence. Filiberto, his perfidious squire, thinks he can marry his daughter, Greta. She discovers that Paolo, the son of Duke Bresci, is not dead as wrongly communicated. She falls in love with him while the young man vows to avenge his father, who was forced into exile by Count Tramontana, and tries to free his daughter, Gisella, who engaged to Count Mario Del Balzo. Paolo, aided by reinforcements, manages to conquer Matera while Rambaldo and Filiberto are killed after a bloody sword fight. Once the city is liberated, two weddings are celebrated.

== Cast ==
- Otello Toso as Rambaldo Tramontana, Count of Matera
- Virna Lisi as Greta Tramontana
- Giacomo Rossi Stuart as Duke Paolo Bressi
- Paul Müller as Filiberto
- Eva Vanicek as Marquisse Taldi
- Aldo Bufi Landi as Count Mario Del Balzo
- Wandisa Guida as Gisella Bressi
- Emilio Petacci as Duke Bressi
- Guido Celano as Giacomo
- Nietta Zocchi as Greta's Housekeeper
- Armando Migliari as Antonio
- Bruna Cealti as Giacomo's Wife
- Pasquale De Filippo as Alfredo
- Renato Chiantoni as Rambaldo's Henchman
- Pietro De Vico as Golia
- Erminio Spalla as Golia's 's Henchman
- Carlo Tamberlani as The architect
- Edoardo Toniolo as Count Ruggi
- Nerio Bernardi as Marquis Taldi
- Nazzareno Zamperla as Marco
- Elena Sedlak as The Ballerina
- Ugo Sasso as The Messenger
- Corrado Annicelli as The Spy
- Amedeo Trilli as Greta's Escort Soldier
