= Sword in the Shadows =

1961 film

- Directed by: Luigi Capuano
- Written by: Gino De Santis; Sergio Sollima
- Produced by: Fortunato Misiano
- Starring: Tamara Lees; Livio Lorenzon
- Cinematography: Carlo Bellero
- Edited by: Jolanda Benvenuti
- Music by: Michele Cozzoli
- Production company: Romana Film
- Release date: 1961
- Language: Italian

Sword in the Shadows (Italian: Una spada nell'ombra) is a 1961 Italian swashbuckler film directed by Luigi Capuano and starring Tamara Lees and Livio Lorenzon.

== Cast ==
- Tamara Lees as Countess Ottavia della Rocca
- Livio Lorenzon as Captain Mellina
- Gabriella Farinon as Lavinia (credited as Gaby Farinon)
- Mario Valdemarin as Fabrizio
- Germano Longo as Braccio
- Pina Cornel as Iolanda
- Gianni Rizzo as Giorgio
- Lydia Johnson as Marta
- Loris Gizzi as Zio Roger
- Gianni Solaro as Capitano delle guardie
- Diego Michelotti as Fabio
- Tullio Altamura as Duke Ercole Altavilla
- Ugo Sasso as Baccio's Servant
- Gianni Baghino as Zingano
- Ignazio Balsamo as Zingano
- Piero Pastore as Guard
