= Tears of Love =

1954 film

- Directed by: Pino Mercanti
- Written by: Michele Galdieri; Franco Perroni
- Produced by: Fortunato Misiano
- Starring: Achille Togliani; Katina Ranieri; Bianca Maria Fusari
- Cinematography: Augusto Tiezzi
- Edited by: Jolanda Benvenuti
- Music by: Carlo Innocenzi
- Production company: Romana Film
- Distributed by: Siden Film
- Release date: 28 December 1954
- Running time: 107 minutes
- Country: Italy
- Language: Italian

Tears of Love (Italian: Lacrime d'amore) is a 1954 Italian musical melodrama film directed by Pino Mercanti and starring Achille Togliani, Katina Ranieri and Otello Toso.

== Cast ==
- Achille Togliani as Mario Benetti
- Katina Ranieri as Grazia Montalto
- Bianca Maria Fusari as Rosella
- Otello Toso as Davide Montalto
- Enrico Glori as Comm. Goebritz
- Umberto Spadaro as Don Vincenzo Benetti
- Rita Rosa
- Inelda Meroni
- Dina De Santis
- Nadia Bianchi
- Mimo Billi
- Roberto Paoletti
- John Kitzmiller
- Carlo Romano
- Nada Cortese
- Piero Giagnoni
- Giacomo Furia
- Galeazzo Benti as Dominique
- Giulio Calì
- Marco Tulli
- Anellina Furia
- Alberto D'Amario
- Renato Lupi
- Edoardo Nevola

== Bibliography ==
- Chiti, Roberto & Poppi, Roberto. Dizionario del cinema italiano: Dal 1945 al 1959. Gremese Editore, 1991.
