= Basaglia =

Basaglia is an Italian surname. Notable people with the surname include:

- Franco Basaglia (1924–1980), Italian neurologist, psychiatrist, professor, and disability advocate
- Maria Basaglia (1912–1998), Italian director and screenwriter
