= Bovo =

Bovo is a surname. Notable people with the surname include:

- Alessandro Bovo (born 1969), Italian water polo player
- Andrea Bovo (born 1986), Italian footballer
- Brunella Bovo (1932–2017), Italian actress
- Cesare Bovo (born 1983), Italian footballer
- Esteban Bovo (born 1962), American politician
