= La voce del sangue =

- Directed by: Pino Mercanti
- Starring: Franca Marzi; Otello Toso; Paul Muller
- Cinematography: Giuseppe La Torre
- Music by: Franco Mannino
- Release date: 7 February 1952
- Country: Italy
- Language: Italian

The Voice of the Blood (Italian: La voce del sangue) is a 1952 Italian melodrama film directed by Pino Mercanti.

== Cast ==
- Paul Muller as Count Franco Sampieri
- Franca Marzi as Elsa Di Lauro
- Otello Toso as Carlo Mattei
- Evi Maltagliati as Giulia Scala
- Lyla Rocco as Lucia
- Enrico Glori as Gabriele
- Filippo Scelzo as Donato Scala
- Roberto Risso as Sergio Scala
- Lia Orlandini as Lucia's Mother
- Jone Morino
