= Difendo il mio amore =

- Directed by: Giulio Macchi
- Written by: Ettore Giannini; Jacques Robert
- Produced by: Titanus
- Cinematography: Gianni Di Venanzo
- Edited by: Mario Serandrei
- Music by: Renzo Rossellini
- Release date: 12 September 1956
- Running time: 95 minutes
- Country: Italy
- Language: Italian

Difendo il mio amore is a 1956 Italian film. It stars actor Gabriele Ferzetti.

== Plot ==
As part of a story, a reporter goes to meet Elisa, a young woman he met a few years ago on a trial on which she was finally exonerated.

== Cast ==
- Gabriele Ferzetti: Pietro
- Martine Carol: Elsa
- Vittorio Gassman: Giovanni
- Arnoldo Foà: avvocato
- Charles Vanel: Verdisio
- Giorgia Moll: Orietta
- Leonardo Bragaglia
- Alan Furlan
- Elena Altieri
- Mino Doro
- Clelia Matania
- Loris Gizzi
- Enrico Glori
- Antonella Della Porta
- Renato Chiantoni
