= 008: Operation Exterminate =

- Italian: 008: Operazione sterminio
- Directed by: Umberto Lenzi
- Written by: Umberto Lenzi
- Produced by: Fortunato Misiano
- Cinematography: Augusto Tiezzi
- Edited by: Jolanda Benvenuti
- Music by: Angelo Francesco Lavagnino
- Release date: 3 September 1965
- Running time: 84 minutes
- Country: Italy
- Language: Italian

008: Operation Exterminate (Italian: A 008, operazione Sterminio) is a 1965 Italian/Egyptian Eurospy action film directed and written by Umberto Lenzi and filmed in Egypt and Switzerland. It starred Ingrid Schoeller as Agent 008, and Alberto Lupo as Agent 006.

== Plot ==
British agent 006 (Frank Smith) must recover a powerful super technology called "anti-radar"; his fellow American Agent 008 (MacDonald) follows him because she suspects something sinister. Thwarting their efforts is an evil organization of spies who are allied with the Russians. After Agent 006 is able to recover the original plans of the machine in a journey from Switzerland to Egypt, Agent 008 discovers that 006 is actually a Russian spy. In a strange twist ending, set in a bowling alley, Smith turns out to be a British spy after all.

== Cast ==
- Ingrid Schoeller as MacDonald, agent 008
- Alberto Lupo as Frank Smith, agent 006
- Dina De Santis as Beauty institute manager
- Ivano Staccioli as Kemp, hotel manager (credited as John Heston)
- Sal Borgese as Munk (credited as Mark Trevor)
- Omar El-Hariri as Police officer
- Ahmed Louxor (credited as Amed Luxor)
- George Wang as Tanaka
- Edoardo Toniolo as Mister X
- Nando Angelini as Police lieutenant
- Domenico Ravenna as Heinz
- Omar Targoman
- Fortunato Arena as Stabbed man (credited as Lucky Arena)

== Reviews ==
One reviewer described the film as "...surprisingly watchable in spite of being quite hokey." Schoeller's physical attraciveness being one of the film's key draws. Unlike many spy films, several reviewers have noted the lack of fight scenes, although the blonde haired Schoeller does manage to fight several women in a spa when she realizes she's being set up by enemy agents.

Set locations in Egypt and Switzerland were noted as a highlight of the film.
