= Gino Leurini =

Italian actor (1934–2014)

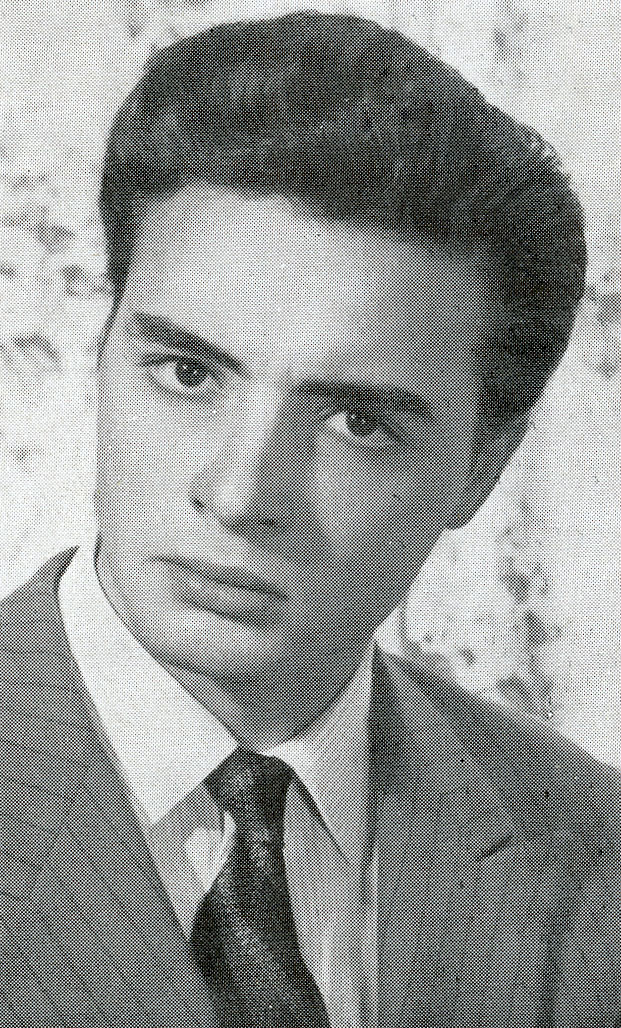
- Leurini in Cineguida magazine, 1954
- Born: 20 November 1934; Rome, Italy
- Died: 12 August 2014 (aged 79); Rome, Italy
- Occupation: Actor

Gino Leurini (20 November 1934 – 12 August 2014) was an Italian film, stage and television actor.

== Life and career ==
Born in Rome, Leurini made his film debut in 1947, in the Luigi Capuano's drama film Legge di sangue. One year later, he got the role of Garrone in Vittorio De Sica and Duilio Coletti's Heart and Soul. Following the critical and commercial success of Léonide Moguy's Tomorrow Is Too Late, in which Leurini played the major role of the young student Franco, in the 1950s he started a brief season of major roles in adventure and melodrama films.

== Filmography ==
Year	Title	Role	Notes
1948	Heart and Soul	Garrone	
1948	Legge di sangue		
1948	The Street Has Many Dreams	Il garzone del lattaio	Uncredited
1949	Fabiola		
1949	Vento d'Africa		
1950	Tomorrow Is Too Late	Franco Berardi	
1951	Il caimano del Piave	Goffredo - compagno di scuola	Uncredited
1951	Revenge of a Crazy Girl	Stefano	
1951	Cops and Robbers	Alfredo	
1952	The Wonderful Adventures of Guerrin Meschino	Guerrin Meschino	
1952	Red Shirts	Andrea	
1952	The Shameless Sex	Enrico Lari	
1952	The Queen of Sheba	Prince Rehoboam of Jerusalem	
1953	Past Lovers		
1955	Ricordami	Paolo Barra	
1956	Storia di una minorenne		
1956	Sangue di zingara	Donato	
1961	Man nennt es Amore	Roberto	(final film role)
