= Clara Calamai =

Italian actress (1909–1998)

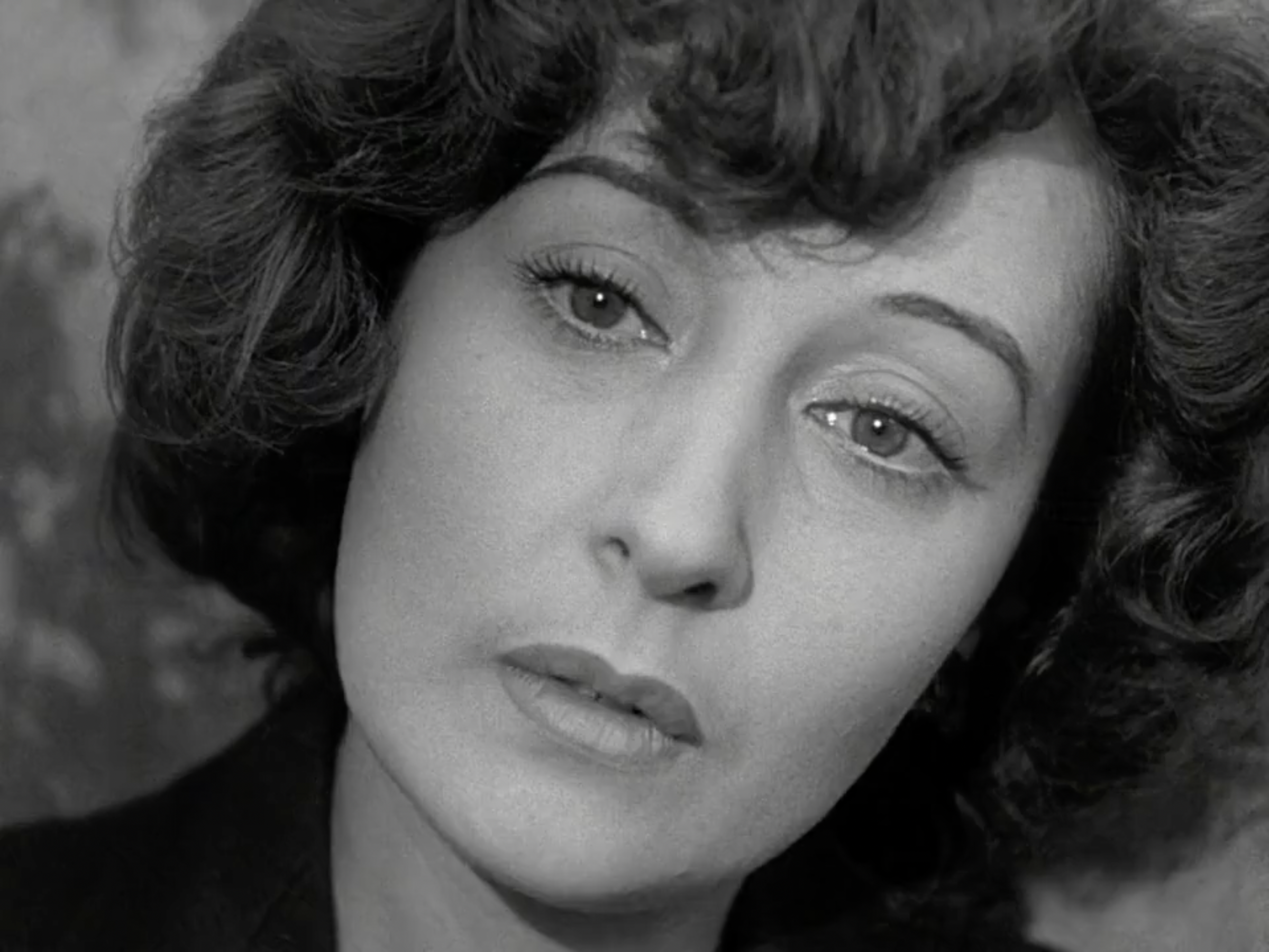
- Calamai in a scene from Ossessione (1943)
- Born: 7 September 1909; Prato, Tuscany, Kingdom of Italy
- Died: 21 September 1998 (aged 89); Rimini, Emilia-Romagna, Italy
- Burial place: Monumental Cemetery of Rimini
- Other name: Clara Mais
- Occupation: Actress
- Spouse: Leonardo Bonzi (m. 1945; ann. 1959)

Clara Calamai (7 September 1909 – 21 September 1998) was an Italian film actress.

== Career ==
Calamai was born in Prato, in the region of Tuscany, on 7 September 1909.

Calamai's first acting role was in the 1938 war film Pietro Micca, directed by Aldo Vergano.

In Alessandro Blasetti's The Jester's Supper (1942), Calamai briefly appeared topless in a scene. The scene is commonly credited with being the first time that an actress had appeared topless in an Italian sound film, although Vittoria Carpi showed a bare breast for a moment in the 1941 film La corona di ferro (The Iron Crown), which was also directed by Blasetti. Calamai stated in a later interview that the original script did not have the character revealing herself this way and did not want to do the scene, but felt compelled by the director to do it and gave in when she was promised a closed set.

Her most remembered role was in the film Luchino Visconti's Ossessione (1943), in which she played Giovanna, the ill-fated female protagonist.

Calamai was offered the lead role in L'adultera (The Adulteress, 1946, directed by Duilio Coletti), after Anna Magnani, originally cast in the part, "was visibly five months' pregnant when she arrived on the set." Calamai was awarded the Nastro d'Argento (Silver Ribbon) in 1946 for best actress for her performance in the film.

She played a prostitute in Luchino Visconti's Le notti bianche (1957) and appeared in Le streghe (1967).

After years of retirement, she returned in 1975 to appear in the horror film Profondo rosso (Deep Red, directed by Dario Argento) as the eccentric matriarch, Marta.

== Personal life ==
On 19 May 1945 she married explorer, and documentary film maker Count Leonardo Bonzi with whom she had two daughters. The marriage was annulled in November 1959, and she lived with Captain of Aviation Valerio Andreoni.

Calamai died in Rimini, in Emilia-Romagna, on 21 September 1998. Calamai is buried in the Monumental Cemetery of Rimini. In September 2022, a stele dedicated to her was unveiled in the cemetery behind the funerary monument of Federico Fellini.

== Partial filmography ==
- Pietro Micca (1938, directed by Aldo Vergano) - La contessa de Lassere
- Il destino in tasca (1938, directed by Gennaro Righelli)
- They've Kidnapped a Man (1938, directed by Gennaro Righelli)
- Ettore Fieramosca (1938, directed by Alessandro Blasetti) - Fulvia
- I, His Father (1939, directed by Mario Bonnard) - Renata
- The Fornaretto of Venice (1939, directed by Duilio Coletti) (doppiata da Tina Lattanzi) - Olimpia Zeno
- L'eredità in corsa (1939, directed by Oreste Biancoli) - Lilli
- The Silent Partner (1939, directed by Roberto Roberti) - La moglie di Prado
- Le sorprese del vagone letto (1940, directed by Gian Paolo Rosmino) - La canzonettista
- Boccaccio (1940, directed by Marcello Albani) - Giannina, falso Boccaccio
- Captain Fracasse (1940, directed by Duilio Coletti) (doppiata da Tina Lattanzi) - Iolanda De Foix
- Goodbye Youth (1940, directed by Ferdinando Maria Poggioli) - Elena
- Manovre d'amore (1940, directed by Gennaro Righelli) - Agnese, l'istitutrice
- Caravaggio (1941, directed by Goffredo Alessandrini) - Madonna Giaconella
- Il re del circo (1941, directed by Hans Hinrich) - Bianca
- I mariti - Tempesta d'amore (1941, directed by Camillo Mastrocinque) - Clara Ferri
- Light in the Darkness (1941, directed by Mario Mattoli) - Amelia Gioiosi
- Thrill (1941, directed by Giacomo Gentilomo) - Federica Usticky
- Pirates of Malaya (1941, directed by Enrico Guazzoni) - Ada
- The Adventuress from the Floor Above (1941, directed by Raffaello Matarazzo) - Biancamaria Rossi
- The Jester's Supper (1942, directed by Alessandro Blasetti) - Ginevra
- The Queen of Navarre (1942, directed by Carmine Gallone) - Isabella del Portogallo
- La guardia del corpo (1942, directed by Carlo Ludovico Bragaglia) - Adriana
- Le vie del cuore (1942, directed by Camillo Mastrocinque) - La baronessa Emilia Carpineti
- Ossessione (1943, directed by Luchino Visconti) - Giovanna Bragana
- Enrico IV (1943, directed by Giorgio Pàstina) - Matilde Spina / Frida
- A Little Wife (1943, directed by Giorgio Bianchi) - Isa
- Farewell Love! (1943, directed by Gianni Franciolini) - Laura Acquaviva
- The Materassi Sisters (1944, directed by Ferdinando Maria Poggioli) - Peggy
- La resa di Titì (1945, directed by Giorgio Bianchi) - Paola De Marchi
- Two Anonymous Letters (1945, directed by Mario Camerini) - Gina
- The Adulteress (1946, directed by Duilio Coletti) - Velca
- The Tyrant of Padua (1946, directed by Max Neufeld) - Tisbe
- Il mondo vuole così (1946, directed by Giorgio Bianchi) - Carla
- Last Love (1947, directed by Luigi Chiarini) - Maria, la canzonetista
- When the Angels Sleep (1947, directed by Gilberto Gascon) - Elena
- Prelude to Madness (1948, directed by Gianni Franciolini (doppiata da Lydia Simoneschi) - Elena Leonardi
- Romanticismo (1949, directed by Clemente Fracassi) - Giuditta Ansperti
- Sicilian Uprising (1949, directed by Giorgio Pàstina) - Elena Di Caltabellotta
- The Phantom Musketeer (1952, directed by Max Calandri) - Marina Venier
- Carne inquieta (1952, directed by Silvestro Prestifilippo) - Marchesa di Francavilla
- White Nights (1957, directed by Luchino Visconti) - La prostituta
- Slave Women of Corinth (1958, directed by Mario Bonnard) - Stenele
- Tom Jones (1960, TV Mini-Series)
- The Witches (1967, directed by Luchino Visconti) - Ex-actress (segment "Strega Bruciata Viva, La")
- Deep Red (1975, directed by Dario Argento) - Marta
- The Sinner (1975, directed by Pier Ludovico Pavoni) - Michele's Mother (final film role)
