= The Black Duke =

- Directed by: Pino Mercanti
- Written by: Mario Amendola
- Starring: Cameron Mitchell; Maria Grazia Spina
- Cinematography: Antonio Macasoli
- Music by: Giorgio Fabor
- Release date: 1963
- Country: Italy
- Language: Italian

The Black Duke (Italian: Il duca nero) is a 1963 Italian historical adventure film directed by Pino Mercanti.

== Plot ==
The domain of the cruel Cesare Borgia is opposed by Caterina Sforza, who gives the assignment to the beautiful Geneva to assassinate him. But Geneva and Cesare fall in love.

== Cast ==
- Cameron Mitchell as Cesare Borgia
- Maria Grazia Spina as Ginevra
- Conrado San Martín as Riccardo Brancaleone
- Franco Fantasia as Veniero
- Gloria Osuna as Lucrezia Borgia
- Manuel Castineiras as Tancredi
- Dina De Santis as Lavinia Serpieri
- Gloria Milland as Caterina Sforza
- Giovanni Vari as Morialdo
- Giulio Maculani as Giulio
- Nino Persello as Tito Serpieri
- Silvio Bagolini as Serafino
- Piero Gerlini as Gabino
