= I cavalieri dalle maschere nere =

- Directed by: Pino Mercanti
- Written by: Giuseppe Zucca; Ovidio Imara; Lionello De Felice; Luigi Chiarini; Pino Mercanti
- Based on: I Beati Paoli by Luigi Natoli
- Starring: Otello Toso; Lea Padovani
- Cinematography: Piero Portalupi
- Music by: Pietro Ferro
- Release date: 1948
- Country: Italy
- Language: Italian

I cavalieri dalle maschere nere (I Beati Paoli) (also known as The Knights of the Black Masks and The Sect of the Hooded) is a 1948 Italian adventure film directed by Pino Mercanti and starring Otello Toso and Lea Padovani. It is loosely based on the novel I Beati Paoli written by Luigi Natoli.

The film grossed over 100 million lire at the Italian box office.

== Cast ==
- Otello Toso as Blasco di Castiglione
- Lea Padovani as Violante
- Massimo Serato as Young Count de la Motte
- Paola Barbara as Madame de la Motte
- Mario Ferrari as Count Raimondo de la Motte
- Paolo Stoppa as The Stuttering Nobleman
- Carlo Ninchi as Duke Coriolano
- Michele Abruzzo as Matteo
- Umberto Spadaro as Gegè
- Rosolino Bua as The Abbott
