= Operation Mitra =

- Directed by: Giorgio Cristallini
- Starring: Steve Barclay; Marina Berti
- Music by: Mario Nascimbene
- Production company: Roberta Film
- Release date: 1951
- Running time: 92 minutes
- Country: Italy
- Language: Italian

Operation Mitra (Italian: Operazione Mitra) is a 1951 Italian thriller film directed by Giorgio Cristallini and starring Steve Barclay and Marina Berti.

== Plot ==
Stefano Carli, an upstanding young Italian man falls into a life of crime in order to continue to afford his trophy girlfriend.

== Cast ==
- Steve Barclay as Stefano Carli
- Marina Berti
- Margherita Bagni
- Silvio Bagolini
- Vickie Henderson
- Piero Lulli
- Carlo Ninchi
- Franco Pesce
- Paola Quattrini
- Roberto Risso
- Giovanna Scotto
- Liliana Tellini
- Marco Vicario

== Bibliography ==
- Emiliano Morreale. Così piangevano: il cinema melò nell'Italia degli anni Cinquanta. Donzelli Editore, 2011.
