= Marina Giordana =

Italian actress

- Born: February 20, 1955 (age 70); Rome, Lazio, Italy
- Occupation: Actress

Marina Giordana (born February 20, 1955) is an Italian actress.

== Biography ==
Giordana was born in Rome, the daughter of actors Marina Berti and Claudio Gora, and the sister of actors Andrea and Carlo Giordana.

She began her acting career with a role in the Italian comedy Che notte quella notte! (1976) and the little-known film Quella strana voglia d'amare (1977). Her best-known film is the crime thriller La belva col mitra from 1977, starring Helmut Berger and Marisa Mell.

However, Giordana soon abandoned her film career and instead went on to act in numerous fotoromanzi (magazine photo novels illustrated with photographs instead of drawings) for publishing house Lancio. Giordana worked at Lancio from late 1976 to early 1981 appearing in more than 90 fotoromanzi.

After her time at Lancio, Giordana has continued her acting career with theatrical work that includes Shakespeare plays such as Love's Labour's Lost and The Taming of the Shrew, and Under Milk Wood by Dylan Thomas.

Recent film roles include the award-winning drama Concorrenza sleale (2001), directed by renowned filmmaker Ettore Scola, and the comedy Se fossi in te (2001).

Giordana appeared in some TV movies in the 1980s and participated in TV series such as L'ispettore Giusti (1999) directed by Sergio Martino, and Giornalisti (2000). Giordana is played the regular role of Artemisia Scalzi during the first two seasons (2003–2004) of the TV series Elisa di Rivombrosa.
