= The Valley of the Devil =

1943 film

- Film poster
- Directed by: Mario Mattoli
- Written by: Mario Mattoli; Leo Catozzo; Lorenzo Pegoraro
- Starring: Marina Berti; Carlo Ninchi; Andrea Checchi
- Cinematography: Renato Del Frate
- Edited by: Leo Catozzo
- Music by: Salvatore Allegra
- Production company: Grandi Film
- Distributed by: SANGRAF
- Release date: 6 April 1943
- Running time: 83 minutes
- Country: Italy
- Language: Italian

The Valley of the Devil (Italian: La valle del diavolo) is a 1943 Italian historical drama film directed by Mario Mattoli and starring Marina Berti, Carlo Ninchi and Andrea Checchi. It was shot at the Palatino Studios in Rome. The film's sets were designed by the art director Piero Filippone and Mario Rappini.

== Cast ==
- Marina Berti as Greta Hansel
- Carlo Ninchi as Il capitano medico Hansel
- Andrea Checchi as Il tenente medico Peter Grundel
- Osvaldo Valenti as Il barone Rider
- Ada Dondini as Zia Frida
- Nino Pavese as Stefano, il maggiordomo
- Gildo Bocci as Il postiglione
- Tino Scotti as Olaf, il marinaio attendente
- Carlo Duse

== Bibliography ==
- Parish, Robert. Film Actors Guide. Scarecrow Press, 1977.
