= Mermaid of Naples =

1956 film by Luigi Capuano

- Directed by: Luigi Capuano
- Written by: Luigi Capuano; Alfredo Giannetti
- Produced by: Fortunato Misiano
- Starring: Marisa Allasio; Massimo Serato
- Cinematography: Augusto Tiezzi
- Music by: Michele Cozzoli
- Release date: 27 September 1956
- Language: Italian

Mermaid of Naples (Italian: Maruzzella) is a 1956 Italian musical melodrama film directed by Luigi Capuano.

== Cast ==
- Marisa Allasio: Maruzzella
- Massimo Serato: Salvatore
- Yvette Lebon: Donna Carmela
- Adolfo Geri: Caputo
- Renato Carosone: Renato
- Carlo Tamberlani: Don Mario
- Virginia Balistrieri: Aunt Concetta

== See also ==
- List of Italian films of 1956
