= La paura fa 90 =

- Directed by: Giorgio Simonelli
- Cinematography: Tino Santoni
- Edited by: Nino Baragli
- Release date: 1951
- Country: Italy
- Language: Italian

La paura fa 90 [lit. 'Fear makes 90' (Note: La paura fa 90 is a proverbial phrasing, based on the cabalistic symbolism of the number 90, implying that fear makes people do unexpected things)] is a 1951 Italian comedy film directed by Giorgio Simonelli. The film stars Ugo Tognazzi.

== Plot ==
In the 17th century, the Duke of Boffignac, a captain in the king's musketeers, is murdered by the husband of a woman Boffignac had an affair with, a certain Champignon. Since then, the Duke's ghost wanders in the castle of his killer, condemned to remain there until he has taken his revenge by eliminating every last one of his assassin's descendants.

In the early 1950s, the members of a troupe of comedians is forced to spend a night in the castle. Although the guards Pinotto and Bargilio are there to welcome them, the castle is virtually abandoned.

Among the troupe is Carlo Champignon, a descendant of the man who killed Boffignac. The company's actor, Anastasio Lapin, having learned the story of Boffignac's ghost, disguises himself as a phantom musketeer to appear at midnight. But Lapin meets Boffignac's real ghost, and faints from fear.

The ghost is greeted with pillows by the actresses, as they believe it is Anastasio. So the spectre hides in an old trunk, his usual daytime refuge. When the troupe returns home, they also take the trunk (and the ghost with it) with them.

The ghost performs some prodigies on stage and is even hired by the impresario. In the end, when one soubrette - after trying to kill the impresario out of jealousy - falsely accuses Carlo, the ghost generously takes his side, declaring that the best revenge is forgiveness. The gesture redeems him, and he can finally ascend to Heaven, with his fellow musketeers, who have been waiting for him.

== Cast ==
- Silvana Pampanini: Luisa Binneur
- Ugo Tognazzi: Anastasio Lapin/Saverio, duke of Boffignac
- Franca Marzi: Nanda Fougère
- Carlo Croccolo: Pinotto
- Virgilio Riento: Bargilio
- Galeazzo Benti: Carlo Champignon
- Luigi Pavese: the impresario
- Anna Maria Bottini: gipsy
- Mario Castellani: Lefevre (lawyer)
- Alfredo Rizzo: the prompter
- Clara Auteri: great-granddaughter of count François Champignon

== Reception ==
The film was noted for its comedy horror aspects.
