= Police Call =

Police Call may refer to:

- Police Call (TV series), a 1955 American anthology television series
- Police Call (film), a 1933 Pre-code American crime drama film
