= Agostino Salvietti =

Italian actor

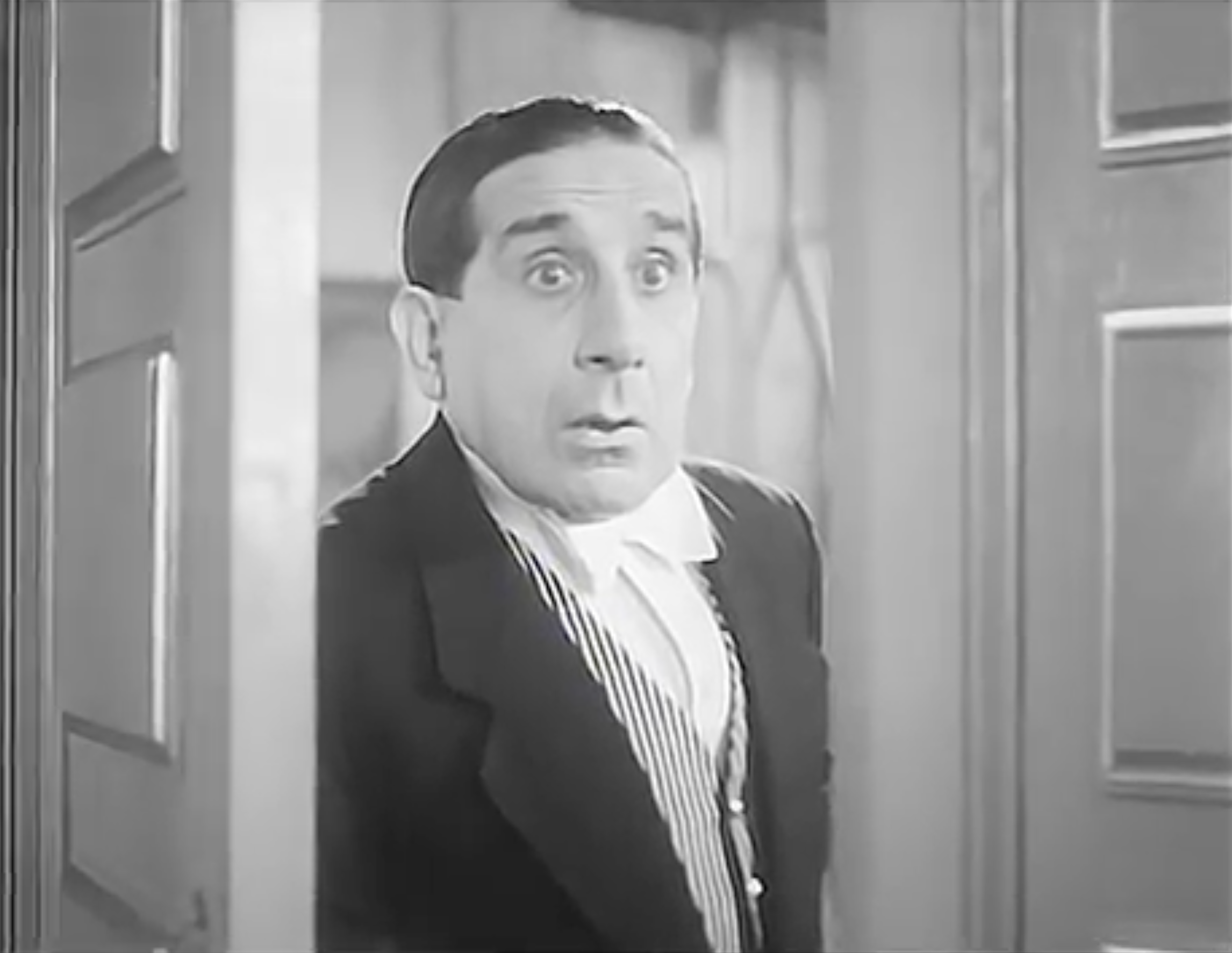
- Salvietti in I Don't Know You Anymore (1936)
- Born: 28 August 1882; Naples, Italy
- Died: 2 December 1967 (aged 85); Naples, Italy
- Occupation: Actor
- Years active: 1924-1964

Agostino Salvietti (28 August 1882 - 2 December 1967) was an Italian actor. He appeared in more than forty films from 1924 to 1964.

== Filmography ==
Year	Title	Role	Notes
1924	Totonno se ne va		
1935	Naples in Green and Blue		
1936	Music in the Square		
1936	I Don't Know You Anymore	Francesco - Il maggiordomo	
1937	Gli ultimi giorni di Pompeo		
1938	Naples of Olden Times	Luigino	
1938	Inventiamo l'amore	L'usciere	
1939	Defendant, Stand Up!	Una guardia	
1942	The Adventures of Fra Diavolo	Ciccio La Rosa, il capo della polizia	
1942	The Lady Is Fickle	Il cuoco	
1946	Canto, ma sottovoce...	Gennaro	
1947	Lost in the Dark		
1947	Dove sta Zazà?		
1948	Difficult Years	Fegarotta	
1948	L'isola di Montecristo	Ombra	
1948	The Man with the Grey Glove	Custode del museo	
1948	Baron Carlo Mazza	Portiere d'albergo	
1948	Eleven Men and a Ball		
1949	Monaca santa	Nicola Percuoco	
1949	Alarm Bells	Il sindaco	
1949	Marechiaro	Nicola	
1949	Le due madonne		
1950	Santo disonore	Peppe	
1950	Passione fatale		
1951	Il mago per forza		
1951	Destiny	Papa' Ciocchetti	
1951	The Counterfeiters	Venditore di libri usati	
1952	What Price Innocence?	Contadino	
1952	The City Stands Trial	Brigadiere Mastellone	
1952	Rimorso		
1953	A Husband for Anna	L'antiquario	
1953	Anni facili		
1953	Ivan (il figlio del diavolo bianco)		
1953	Passione		
1954	Neapolitan Carousel	Prompter	
1954	Papà Pacifico	Avvocato Gioffani	
1954	The Gold of Naples	Gennaro Esposito	(segment "Il guappo")
1957	The Lady Doctor	Johnny	
1958	Io, mammeta e tu	Maggiore medico	
1958	Toto in Paris	Custode del museo delle cere	
1958	Toto in the Moon	L'amministratore	
1959	Quel tesoro di papà	Marchese Luigi de Licori	
1961	A porte chiuse	Polydette, il canceliere	
1961	The Last Judgment		
1961	Queen of the Seas	Pirate Mangiatrippa	
1961	Pugni pupe e marinai		
1963	Gli onorevoli	Nicola - Butler in La Trippa house	
1963	Yesterday, Today and Tomorrow	Dr. Verace	(segment "Adelina")
1964	Tears on Your Face	Vincenzo	(final film role)
