= La trovatella di Milano =

- Directed by: Giorgio Capitani
- Written by: Gigliola Falluto; Giuseppe Mangione
- Based on: La trovatella di Milano by Carolina Invernizio
- Starring: Massimo Serato; Franca Marzi
- Cinematography: Arturo Gallea
- Music by: Giovanni Fusco
- Release date: 1956
- Language: Italian

La trovatella di Milano (i.e. "The foundling of Milan") is a 1956 Italian historical melodrama film produced and directed by Giorgio Capitani and starring Massimo Serato and Franca Marzi. Set during the Five Days of Milan, it is loosely based on a novel with the same name written by Carolina Invernizio. It grossed 146 million lire at the Italian box office.

== Cast ==
- Massimo Serato as Gabriele
- Franca Marzi as Corinna
- Otello Toso as Count Patti
- Luisella Boni as Maria
- Rita Giannuzzi as Count Patti's Nephew
- Luigi Tosi as Diego
- Franco Festucci as Ferruccio
