= A Sporting Chance (1945 film) =

1945 film by George Blair

- Official poster
- Directed by: George Blair
- Written by: Paul Gangelin; Dane Lussier
- Produced by: Rudolph E. Abel
- Starring: Jane Randolph; John O'Malley; Steve Barclay
- Cinematography: Marcel Le Picard
- Edited by: Ralph Dixon
- Music by: Richard Cherwin
- Production company: Republic Pictures
- Distributed by: Republic Pictures
- Release date: June 4, 1945
- Running time: 55 minutes
- Country: United States
- Language: English

A Sporting Chance is a 1945 American comedy film directed by George Blair and starring Jane Randolph, John O'Malley and Steve Barclay. The screenplay concerns a spoiled young woman who has to get and keep a job before she is entitled to claim her inheritance.

The film's sets were designed by the art director Russell Kimball.

== Cast ==
- Jane Randolph as Pamela Herrick
- John O'Malley as Steve Walker
- Steve Barclay as Ted Cummings
- Edward Gargan as Mike Ryan
- Isabel Withers as Susan Bailey
- Maxine Semon as Gert
- Selmer Jackson as John Smalley
- Robert Middlemass as William Reardon
- Kenne Duncan as Boarder
- Janet Martin as Specialty

== Bibliography ==
- Len D. Martin. The Republic Pictures Checklist: Features, Serials, Cartoons, Short Subjects and Training Films of Republic Pictures Corporation, 1935-1959. McFarland, 1998.
