= Three Dollars of Lead =

1964 film

- Directed by: Pino Mercanti
- Written by: Pino Mercanti; Silvio Siano
- Cinematography: Manuel Hernández Sanjuán
- Music by: Gioacchino Angelo; Gianni Ferrio
- Distributed by: Variety Distribution
- Release date: 1964
- Running time: 89 minutes
- Countries: Italy; Spain; France
- Language: Italian

Three Dollars of Lead (Italian: Tre dollari di piombo, Spanish: Tres dólares de plomo, French: Trois dollars de plomb), also known as Three Lead Dollars, is a 1964 Spaghetti Western film co-written and directed by Pino Mercanti.

== Plot ==
When Rudy Wallace returns to his father's ranch, he finds it completely destroyed. The entire Dallas area is under the rule of the wealthy Morrison, who wants to get rid of the troublesome local farmers with the help of the violent Mark and is also responsible for the death of Wallace's father. After unsuccessfully trying to get other residents to act against Morrison, Rudy goes after him on his own, but is hampered in fulfilling his revenge by Sheriff Raf, who is after Wallace over a fight. Raf gets to know Rudy's character and eventually helps him complete his revenge.

== Cast ==
- Fred Beir as Rudy Wallace
- Evi Marandi as Anne (credited as Evy Harandis)
- Francisco Nieto as Morrison
- Richard Saint-Bris as Laurence (credited as Rich. St. Bris)
- Dina De Santis (as Dyna De Saint) (credited as Dina De Saint)
- Olivier Mathot as Morrison Henchman (credited as Oliver Mathot)
- Roberto Messina as Mark (credited as Roberto Messanger)
- Ángel Álvarez
- Andrea Fantasia as Ex-Sheriff

== Production ==
The film is an Italian-Spanish-French co-production, and was mainly shot in Jugoslavia, with a few scenes filmed in Spain and in Elios studios in Rome. Mercanti shot it back to back with Damned Pistols of Dallas, mostly with the same cast and crew. In the Spanish prints of the films, José María Zabalza is credited as director, in a move made to secure funding from the Spanish government.
