= Gentlemen of the Night =

- Directed by: Pino Mercanti
- Written by: Marcello Fondato
- Story by: Nino Lillo; Marcello Fondato
- Produced by: Lux film
- Starring: Guy Madison; Lisa Gastoni
- Cinematography: Carlo Bellero
- Music by: Gioacchino Angelo
- Release date: 1964
- Countries: Italy; France
- Language: Italian

Gentlemen of the Night (Italian: Il vendicatore mascherato, French: La vengeance du doge, also known as The Masked Avenger) is a 1964 Italian-French adventure film directed by Pino Mercanti and starring Guy Madison and Lisa Gastoni.

== Plot ==
Massimo returns to Venice after years of fighting against the Turks. He finds his beloved Elena, who in the meantime has married the doge who is tyrannizing the city. Despite the disappointment, he becomes interested in the beautiful Katarina. He decides to lead the group of rebels after a close friend of his is killed under torture for having hatched a plot to eliminate the doge.

== Cast ==
- Guy Madison as Massimo Tiepolo (based on Bajamonte Tiepolo)
- Lisa Gastoni as Elena
- Jean Claudio as Marco Donato
- Ingrid Schoeller as Catarina
- Gastone Moschin as Doge Pietro Gradenigo
- Vanni Materassi as Luca Badoer
- Dina De Santis as Parigina
- Nino Persello as Badoer, the inquisitor
