= Carne inquieta =

- Directed by: Silvestro Prestifilippo
- Written by: Carlo Musso; Silvestro Prestifilippo; J. Rosso; Jacques Rémy; Leonida Rèpaci (novel)
- Starring: Raf Vallone; Marina Berti; Clara Calamai; Luigi Cimara
- Cinematography: Carlo Nebiolo
- Edited by: Mario Serandrei
- Music by: Alessandro Cicognini
- Release date: 1952
- Country: Italy
- Language: Italian

Carne inquieta is a 1952 Italian melodrama film.

== Plot ==
Peppe is a Calabrian boy who falls in love with Fema, who belongs to a local noble family. The refusal of the girl's father to the marriage proposal convinces the boys to flee, but they are hindered by the population of the town.
