= Ingrid Schoeller =

German actress

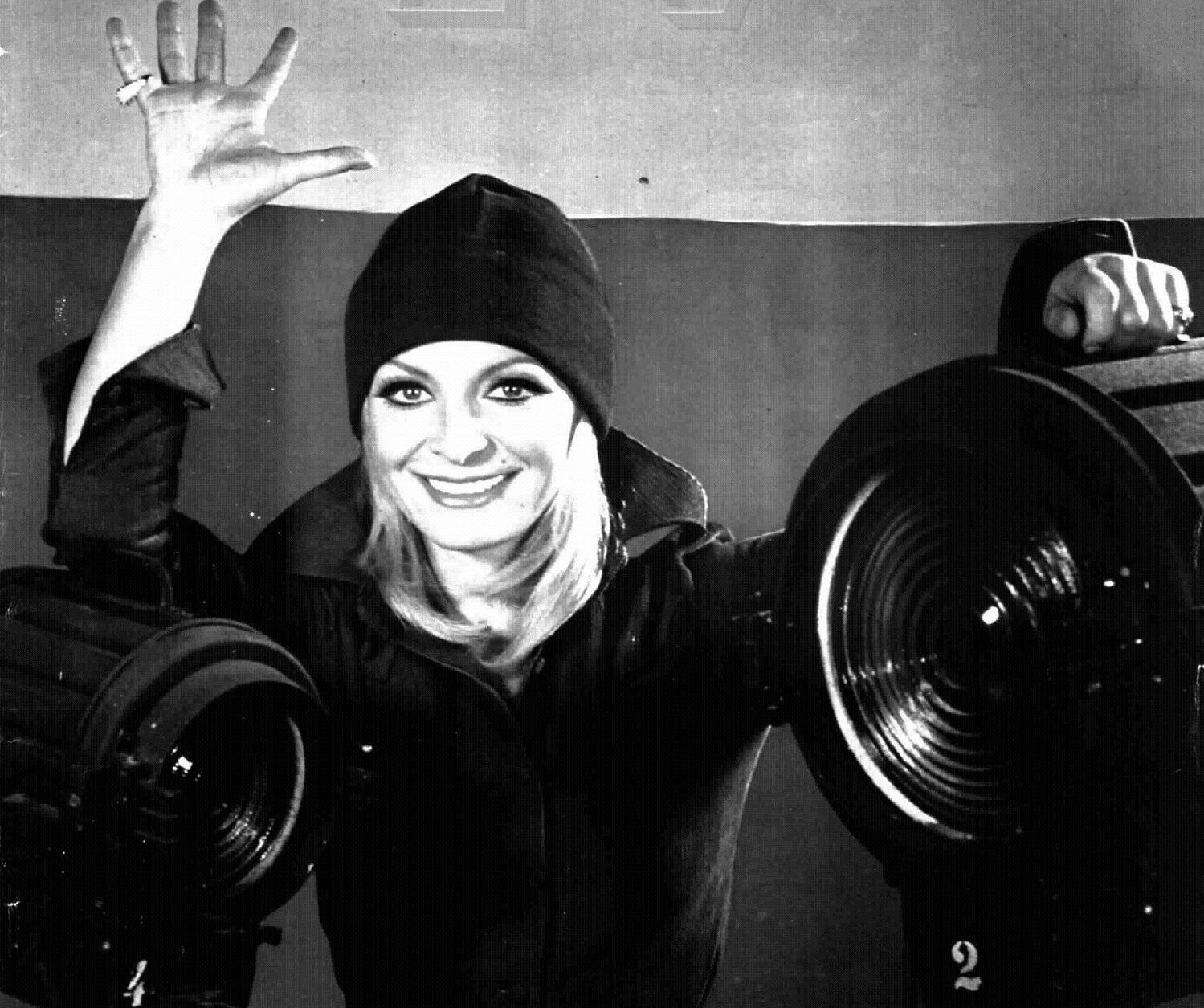
- Schoeller in 1973
- Born: 1942; Cologne, Germany

Ingrid Schoeller (born 1942) was a German film actress best known for her roles as an action heroine in the 1960s.

Tall, slim and blonde, she played the lead role in spy films such as 008: Operation Exterminate.

== Selected filmography ==
- I Don Giovanni della Costa Azzurra (1962)
- My Son, the Hero (1962)
- I maniaci (1964)
- Gentlemen of the Night (1964)
- 002 Agenti Segretissimi
- 008: Operation Exterminate (1965)
- Son of Django (1967)
- Come rubare un quintale di diamanti in Russia (1967) as Tamaras
- Psychopath (1968)
- The Son of Black Eagle (1968)

== External links and sources ==
- Ingrid Schoeller at IMDb
