= Sicilian Uprising =

1949 film

- Directed by: Giorgio Pastina
- Written by: Eugène Scribe (libretto); Charles Duveyrier (libretto); Fulvio Palmieri
- Produced by: Giuseppe D'Angelo
- Starring: Marina Berti; Clara Calamai; Roldano Lupi; Paul Muller
- Music by: Enzo Masetti
- Production companies: Epica; Safir
- Distributed by: Fincine
- Release date: 1949
- Running time: 91 minutes
- Country: Italy
- Language: Italian

Sicilian Uprising or Sicilian Vespers (Italian: Vespro siciliano) is a 1949 Italian historical drama film directed by Giorgio Pastina and starring Marina Berti, Clara Calamai and Roldano Lupi. The film is set in 1282, showing the events leading up to the War of the Sicilian Vespers. It is based on the libretto of the Verdi opera I vespri siciliani, which was itself based on an earlier play written by Eugène Scribe and Charles Duveyrier.

== Cast ==
- Marina Berti as Laura
- Clara Calamai as Elena Di Caltabellotta
- Roldano Lupi as Giovanni Da Procida
- Steve Barclay as Capitaine Drouet
- Paul Muller as Duke de Saint-Rémy, Governor of Palermo
- Ermanno Randi as Ruggero
- Aldo Silvani as Abbot of Santo Spirito
- Carlo Tamberlani as Tommaso
- Aroldo Tieri as Folco
- Gabriele Ferzetti
- Gianni Glori
- Felice Minotti

== Bibliography ==
- Gesù, Sebastiano. La Sicilia e il cinema. Giuseppe Maimone, 1993.
- Aroldo Tieri e il Cinema. Pellegrini Editore, 2007.
