= La tua donna =

- Directed by: Giovanni Paolucci
- Written by: Giuseppe Berto; Giovanni Paolucci; Paride Rombi
- Produced by: Mario Pitto
- Starring: Patricia Neal; Massimo Girotti; Lea Padovani
- Cinematography: Václav Vích
- Music by: Angelo Francesco Lavagnino
- Release date: 1954
- Language: Italian

La tua donna (i.e. "Your Woman") is a 1954 Italian melodrama film co-written and directed by Giovanni Paolucci and starring Patricia Neal, Massimo Girotti and Lea Padovani. It grossed 63 million lire at the Italian box office.

== Plot ==
A politician abandons his family for social climbing. During a violent argument the man accidentally kills his wife. His political career will be destroyed.

== Cast ==
- Patricia Neal as Countess Germana De Torri
- Massimo Girotti as Sandro Ademari
- Lea Padovani as Luisa
- Alex Girotti as Sandro and Luisa's son
- Enrico Viarisio as Maurizio Bennati
- Eduardo Ciannelli as Public Prosecutor
- Armando Migliari as Commendatore
- Alberto Sorrentino as Demostene
- Michele Riccardini as Antonio
- Nerio Bernardi as Defense Attorney
- Hilda Roberts as Hilda
- Alan Furlan as Tom
