= Operation St. Peter's =

1967 film directed by Lucio Fulci

- Italian film poster
- Directed by: Lucio Fulci
- Written by: Adriano Bolzoni; Ennio De Concini; Paul Hengge; Lucio Fulci; Roberto Gianviti
- Produced by: Turi Vasile; Luggi Waldleitner
- Starring: Lando Buzzanca; Jean-Claude Brialy; Edward G. Robinson; Herbert Fux
- Cinematography: Erico Menczer; Alfio Contini
- Edited by: Elisabeth Kleinert-Neumann; Ornella Micheli
- Music by: Ward Swingle; Armando Trovajoli
- Production companies: Ultra Film S.p.A.; Marianne Productions S.A.; Roxy Film GmbH & Co. KG
- Distributed by: Interfilm (Italy); Paramount (France)
- Release dates: 20 January 1968 (Rome); 13 February 1968 (Berlin); 8 August 1968 (France)
- Running time: 96 minutes
- Countries: Italy; France; West Germany
- Language: Italian

Operation St. Peter's, (Italian: Operazione San Pietro) is a 1967 comedy film directed by Lucio Fulci. The film is a sort of unofficial sequel to Treasure of San Gennaro, a heist-comedy film that Dino Risi had filmed the previous year.

The film was co-produced by France, where it was released as Au diable les anges ('To Hell With the Angels'), and West Germany, where it was released as Die Abenteuer des Kardinal Braun ('The Adventure of Cardinal Brown').

== Plot ==
Napoleon, a small-time crook, is serving time in Naples on a robbery charge. He is sprung by accident when the Baron and his two incompetent cohorts, Agonia and the Captain, tunnel under his cell, having lost their way to an expected bank vault. Napoleon escapes with his rescuers through the tunnel and discovers that the three are flat broke, despite the well-dressed appearance of the Baron. Napoleon swiftly asserts himself as leader of the group and suggests that they move to Rome for richer pickings.

On the outskirts of Rome, the gang falls in with Il Cajella, who owns a dilapidated used-car lot which Napoleon elects as his gang's hideout and Cajella as their co-conspirator/protector. At first, Napoleon's renewed criminal activates are unambitious and he is soon caught stealing a woman's purse at a local shopping center. Before the security guards can call the police, Marisa, the victim, announces that she knows him and saves him from arrest. Marisa insists on calling Napoleon "Filiberto" because he resembles her late husband.

Meanwhile, Cajella encounters the beautiful Samantha while cruising for trade at a singles bar mainly populated by wealthy older women. Cajella is unaware that Samantha belongs to a big American criminal named Joe Ventura. Elsewhere, the hungry gang attempts to raise money to buy food by offering American tourists a private view of Michaelangelo's Pieta. When a Vatican employee leaves a forklift truck unattended, Napoleon swathes the statue in a blanket and brazenly carries it on the forklift out into the streets of Rome.

Napoleon brings Marisa to the hideout to seduce her, but accidentally dislodges the sheet to reveal the Pieta. Marisa, a devout Catholic, insists that the statue be returned. Napoleon concedes but claims that he only found the statue. Napoleon and Marisa lead Vatican officials to the hideout, but Ventura and his henchmen arrive first and make off with the statue themselves. Wanted posters depicting Ventura and Cajella are distributed throughout Italy.

Ventura and his men decide to head to Sicily with Vatican police and diverse cardinals, priests, and monks in hot pursuit. Napoleon, Marisa, and the gang team up with Cardinal Braun, a Vatican official who drives like a maniac after the fleeing criminals. Braun drives off a pier and crashes the car on board Ventura's boat just as it sets off for Sicily with the statue. To everyone's surprise, Ventura hands his gun to Braun, for Ventura and Braun were old friends in the Mafia before Braun saw the light. As the boat sails away with both gangs on board, Samantha and Cajella are left behind on the pier. Samantha escapes on water skis and Cajella tries to swim after her to escape from a group of angry female clients of his waiting on the pier.

== Cast ==
- Lando Buzzanca as Napoleone
- Jean-Claude Brialy as Cajella
- Edward G. Robinson as Joe Ventura
- Heinz Rühmann as Cardinal Erik Braun
- Christine Barclay as Marisa
- Antonella Della Porta as Cesira
- Herbert Fux as Targout
- Wolfgang Kieling as Poulain
- Ugo Fangareggi as Agonia
- Uta Levka as Samantha
- Dante Maggio as The Captain
- Pinuccio Ardia as Il barone
- Carlo Pisacane as Epimeno

== Production ==
Operation St. Peter was shot in August 1967. The film was an international co-production between Italy, France and West Germany. It was produced by Rome's Ultra Film, the Paris-based Marianne Productions and Munich's Roxy Film.

== Release ==
Operation St. Peter was released in Rome on January 20, 1968 where it was distributed by Interfilm. It made 643 million Italian lira and was one of Fulci's highest-grossing films from the 1960s.

This was followed by screenings in Berlin as Die Abenteuer des Kardinal Braun (lit. 'The Adventures of Cardinal Brown') on February 13 and in France as Au diable les anges! (lit. 'Damn the Angels!') on August 8, 1968.

The film was never released theatricaelly in the United States but was released in the United Kingdom as Operation St. Peter's and later aired on the BBC on September 27, 1975.
