= Orient Express (TV series) =

Orient Express is a 1953 anthology drama television series set in Europe and syndicated in the United States. Each episode ties-in with a story connected to the famed railroad from which the series takes its name.

The series was produced by PSI Films and consisted primarily of unsuccessful pilots for potential series.

== Episodes ==
There were 26 half hour episodes produced, among them:

- A Master of Calculation (a.k.a. Matter of Calculations), featuring Geraldine Brooks
- European Edition, featuring Jean Pierre Aumont
- The Man of Many Skins, featuring Erich von Stroheim
- His Son (a.k.a. His Boy), featuring Alan Furlan
- The Red Sash, featuring Tala Birell
- The Curse of Agostino, featuring David Hurst
