= The Black Captain =

1951 film by Giorgio Ansoldi and Alberto Pozzetti

- Directed by: Giorgio Ansoldi; Alberto Pozzetti
- Written by: Corrado Capparuccia; Alberto Consiglio; Ettore Maria Margadonna; Virgilio Sabel
- Produced by: Federico D'Avack; Michelangelo Frieri
- Starring: Steve Barclay; Marina Berti; Paul Muller
- Cinematography: Mario Albertelli; Carlo Montuori
- Edited by: Vittorio Solito
- Music by: Raffaele Gervasio
- Production company: Cooperativa Tecnici Cinematografici
- Distributed by: API Film
- Release date: 15 March 1951
- Running time: 92 minutes
- Country: Italy
- Language: Italian

The Black Captain (Italian: Il capitano nero) is a 1951 Italian historical adventure film directed by Giorgio Ansoldi and Alberto Pozzetti and starring Steve Barclay, Marina Berti and Paul Muller.

The film's sets were designed by Alfredo Montori. It was shot at the Cinecittà studios in Rome during 1950 but released the following year. It earned around 202 million lira at the domestic box office.

A swashbuckler set in sixteenth century Italy, it sees Count Marco Adinolfi battling against two rivals.

== Cast ==
- Steve Barclay as Marco Adinolfi
- Marina Berti as Barbara Vivaldi
- Paul Muller as Giuliano
- Marisa Merlini as Lucrezia Adinolfi
- Mario Ferrari as Duca Fabrizzio Di Corvara
- Fedele Gentile as Prospero Venturini
- Andrea Checchi as Fratello Di Marco e Lucrezia
- Roberto Risso as Paolo Adinolfi
- Franca Marzi
- Leo Garavaglia
- Carlo Borelli

== General and cited references ==
- Chiti, Roberto & Poppi, Roberto. Dizionario del cinema italiano: Dal 1945 al 1959. Gremese Editore, 1991.
- Parish, Robert. Film Actors Guide. Scarecrow Press, 1977.
