= What Price Innocence? (1952 film) =

1952 film

- Directed by: Luigi Capuano
- Written by: Luigi Capuano; Fulvio Palmieri
- Produced by: Fortunato Misiano
- Starring: Lída Baarová; Otello Toso; Mariella Lotti
- Cinematography: Augusto Tiezzi
- Edited by: Otello Colangeli
- Music by: Gino Filippini
- Production company: Romana Film
- Distributed by: Romana Film
- Release date: 28 April 1952
- Running time: 92 minutes
- Country: Italy
- Language: Italian

What Price Innocence? (Italian: Gli Innocenti pagano) is a 1952 Italian melodrama film directed by Luigi Capuano and starring Lída Baarová, Otello Toso and Mariella Lotti. The film's sets were designed by the art directors Peppino Piccolo and Gino Brosio.

== Cast ==
- Lída Baarová as Adriana Sereni
- Otello Toso as Stefano Rella
- Mino Doro as Giovanni
- Mariella Lotti as Elena Artesi
- Carlo Romano as Don Settimio
- Ignazio Balsamo as Giovanni
- Paola Quattrini as Ada
- Giovanni Grasso as Suocero di Stefano
- Margherita Bossi as Rosaria
- Bella Starace Sainati as Domestica di Adriana
- Claudio Ermelli as Invitato alla festa di Artesi
- Agostino Salvietti as Contadino
- Gigi Pisano as Bufalaro cantante
- Giovanni Petrucci as Cacciatore

== Bibliography ==
- Bayman, Louis. The Operatic and the Everyday in Postwar Italian Film Melodrama. Edinburgh University Press, 2014.
- Chiti, Roberto & Poppi, Roberto. Dizionario del cinema italiano: Dal 1945 al 1959. Gremese Editore, 1991.
