= Cavallina storna =

1953 film by Giulio Morelli

- Directed by: Giulio Morelli
- Written by: Giulio Morelli; Ettore Maria Margadonna; Adolfo Franci; Jacques Rémy; Nelly Vucetich; Cesare Zavattini
- Story by: Umberto Sacripante
- Produced by: Renato Silvestri
- Starring: Gino Cervi; Franca Marzi
- Cinematography: Giuseppe Caracciolo
- Music by: Roman Vlad
- Distributed by: Variety Distribution
- Release date: 1953
- Language: Italian

Cavallina storna (i.e. "Dappled Mare") is a 1953 Italian historical melodrama film directed by Giulio Morelli and starring Gino Cervi. It is loosely based on several autobiographical poems ("La cavalla storna", "X agosto", "Un ricordo", and "II nido di Farlotti") by Giovanni Pascoli. It grossed about 145 million lire at the Italian box office.

== Plot ==
An engineer accompanies Mariù Pascoli from Bologna to San Mauro, a young woman he had been with for some time. During the journey they get engaged, but the spell is interrupted by the revelation that the young man makes to the girl: he is the son of a captain accused of being responsible for the death of Ruggero Pascoli, Mariù's father.

Ruggero, many years back, was an administrator of the estate of a prince and the captain was employed by him: discovered an embezzlement of the latter, he ran to report him. In the evening, while he was returning home with the gig and holding two dolls to give as gifts to the two girls, someone shot him treacherously; that someone, according to the police, was the captain. The girl's gaze becomes dark and she suddenly pushes him away asking him never to look for her again. Once back home, she is greeted by her aunt who, to distract her, proposes an engagement to a young man from the village who had been waiting for that moment for some time. On the other hand, the engineer, when he returns to his father's house, finds Adalgisa, the attractive housekeeper, engaged in flirting with a mature boy. He does not know that that affair was artfully concocted to hide the truth: Dalgisa is actually the captain's lover and that the latter was really Ruggero's killer, and Dalgisa had lied during the interrogation to the police to make sure that the crime remained without guilty.

Sandro continually searches for Mariù to try to understand the reason for his refusal, even his father remains vague and only Matilda, the girl's aunt, exasperated by his insistence, reveals to him that the family and the whole town consider Baroni the killer of Ruggero despite not having no evidence.

Meanwhile, Baroni is preparing to escape with his son and quarrels with Dalgisa who feels betrayed by the man for whom she lied and from whom she got nothing in return.

Sandro and Mariù meet again, while the girl cannot forget the suffering experienced by the family, the boy convinced of his father's innocence accuses her of having instilled in him the doubt right now that he is about to be recognized and acquire his surname. The boy would be willing to forget everything and marry Mariù, after all if the father was really guilty there would be a sign.

Suddenly they hear screams, Baroni's stable has caught fire and in an attempt to save the animals Baroni is blocked by Dalgisa, responsible for the fire and they both die. When the attendant shouts "the hand of God" the young people realize the truth and separate, this time forever.

== Cast ==
- Gino Cervi as Ruggero Pascoli
- Franca Marzi as Dalgisa
- Cesare Danova as Sandro Fabbri
- Monica Clay as Mariù Pascoli
- Paola Barbara as Matelda Pascoli
- Umberto Sacripante as Baganin
- Emma Baron as Caterina Pascoli
- Clelia Matania as Erminia
- Oscar Andriani as The Intendant
- Michele Riccardini as Francesco
- Carlo Ninchi as Cpt. Baroni
