= I cinque dell'Adamello =

- Directed by: Pino Mercanti
- Screenplay by: Giuseppe Zucca; Giorgio Prosperi; Luigi Emmanuele; Franco Rossi; Guido Leoni; Pino Mercanti
- Story by: Luigi Emmanuele
- Starring: Fausto Tozzi; Nadia Gray
- Cinematography: Romolo Garroni
- Music by: Nello Segurini
- Release date: 1954
- Language: Italian

I cinque dell'Adamello (i. e. "The Five from the Adamello") is a 1954 Italian war drama film written and directed by Pino Mercanti and starring Fausto Tozzi and Nadia Gray.

== Cast ==
- Fausto Tozzi as Leonida
- Nadia Gray as Magda
- Franco Balducci as Renato
- Mario Colli as Momi
- Dario Michaelis as Pinin
- Walter Santesso as Piero
- Attilio Bossio as Doschei
- Saro Urzì as Briscola
- Piera Simoni as Rosina
- Rita Rosa as Mariolina
- Guido Celano as Don Romualdo
- Fedele Gentile as Captain Alvaro
- Mariolina Cappellano as Lauretta
- Dina Perbellini as Piero's Mother
- Cristina Pall as The Marquise
- Michele Malaspina as Piero's Father
- Nino Marchesini as Rector of the College
