= Dieci canzoni d'amore da salvare =

Ten Love Songs
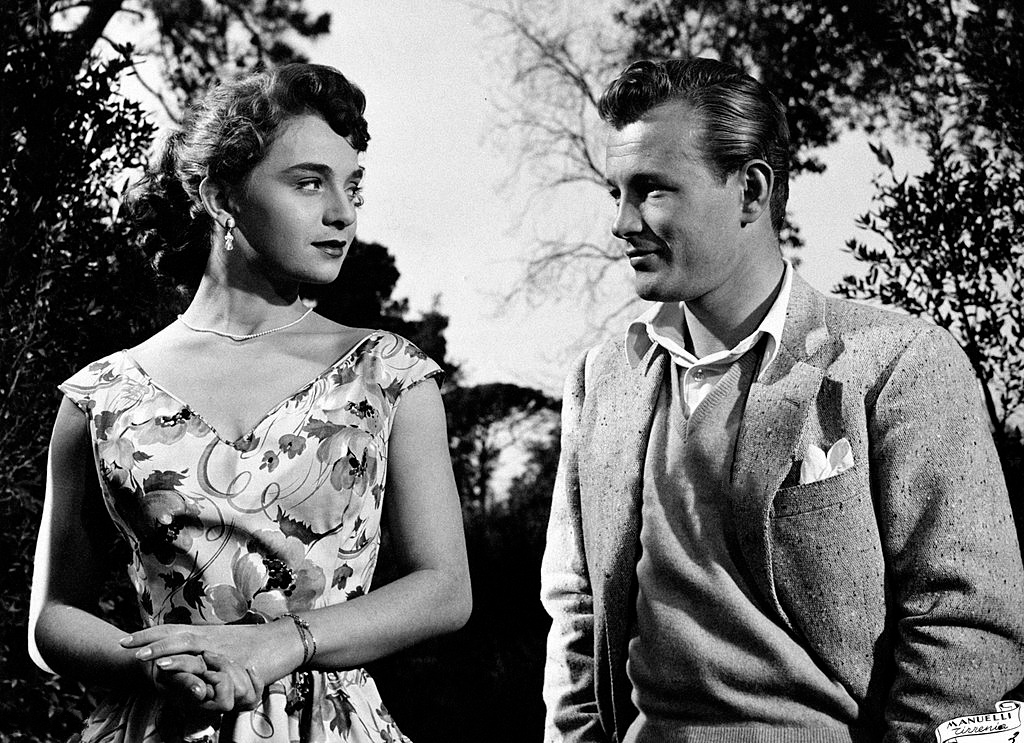
- Brunella Bovo and Jacques Sernas in a scene from the film
- Directed by: Flavio Calzavara
- Written by: Piero De Bernardi; Giuseppe Mangione
- Starring: Jacques Sernas; Brunella Bovo
- Edited by: Giancarlo Cappelli
- Music by: Pippo Barzizza
- Release date: 1953
- Running time: 90 min.
- Country: Italy
- Language: Italian

Dieci canzoni d'amore da salvare (English title: "Ten Love Songs") is a 1953 Italian film directed by Flavio Calzavara. The plot concerns a songwriter, played by Jacques Sernas who leaves his sweetheart and publisher when he learns that he is going blind. Supporting Sernas were Brunella Bovo, Franca Tamantini, and Enrico Viarisio.
