= Some Like It Cold =

1960 film

- Directed by: Steno
- Written by: Vittorio Metz; Roberto Gianviti; Steno
- Cinematography: Massimo Dallamano
- Music by: Carlo Rustichelli
- Distributed by: Variety Distribution
- Release date: 1960
- Running time: 110 minutes
- Country: Italy
- Language: Italian

Some Like It Cold (Italian: A noi piace freddo...!, also known as We Like It Cold) is a 1960 Italian war-comedy film directed by Steno.

== Cast ==
- Ugo Tognazzi: Ugo Bevilacqua
- Raimondo Vianello: count Raimondo
- Yvonne Furneaux: Rosalina
- Francis Blanche: Von Krussendorf
- Rik Van Nutter: captain Callaghan aka "The Cat"
- Peppino De Filippo: Titozzi
- Loris Gizzi: Biondi
- Renato Montalbano: doctor
- Carlo Taranto: Cesarino
- Luisa Mattioli: Laura Biondi
- Fulvia Franco: Luisa
- Brendan Fitzgerald: lieutenant Brown
- Cesare Fantoni: doctor
- Dino Curcio: Vincenzo
- Angela Luce: ragazza litigiosa
- Salvo Libassi: priest
- Piero Pastore: partisan
- Clara Auteri: the doorkeeper at Titozzi's
