= Heart and Soul (1948 film) =

1948 film

- Film poster
- Directed by: Vittorio De Sica; Duilio Coletti
- Written by: Oreste Biancoli; Gaspare Cataldo; Edmondo De Amicis; Adolfo Franci
- Produced by: Domenico Forges Davanzati
- Starring: Vittorio De Sica
- Cinematography: Carlo Montuori
- Edited by: Mario Serandrei
- Music by: Enzo Masetti
- Distributed by: Variety Distribution
- Release date: 10 March 1948
- Running time: 91 minutes
- Country: Italy
- Language: Italian

Heart and Soul (Italian: Cuore, also known as Heart) is a 1948 Italian drama film directed by Vittorio De Sica and Duilio Coletti, based on Edmondo de Amicis' novel Heart. De Sica won the Silver Ribbon for Best Actor by the Italian National Syndicate of Film Journalists.

== Plot ==
The story is about a young student of an upper-class background whose classmates are of working-class backgrounds.

== Cast ==
- Vittorio De Sica as Professor Perboni
- María Mercader as Clotilde Serra
- Lamberto Picasso
- Salvo Randone as father of Precossi
- Giorgio De Lullo as Lt. Renato Gardena
- Luigi Pavese as Lari, substitute teacher
- Ave Ninchi as Signora Serra, mother
- Carlo Ogliotti as Enrico Amici, student
- Gino Leurini as Garrone, student
- Luciano De Ambrosis as Precossi, student
- Gualtiero Tomiselli as Crossi, student
- Sergio Serardi as Franti, student
- Amerigo Martufi as 'Muratorino', student
- Vito Chiari as Coretti, student
- Giorgio Guglielmo as Votini, student
- Francesco Lengo as Nelli, student
- Rino Moretti as Stardi, student
- Carlo Delle Piane as Garoffi, student
