= Clara Auteri =

Italian actress (1918–2018)

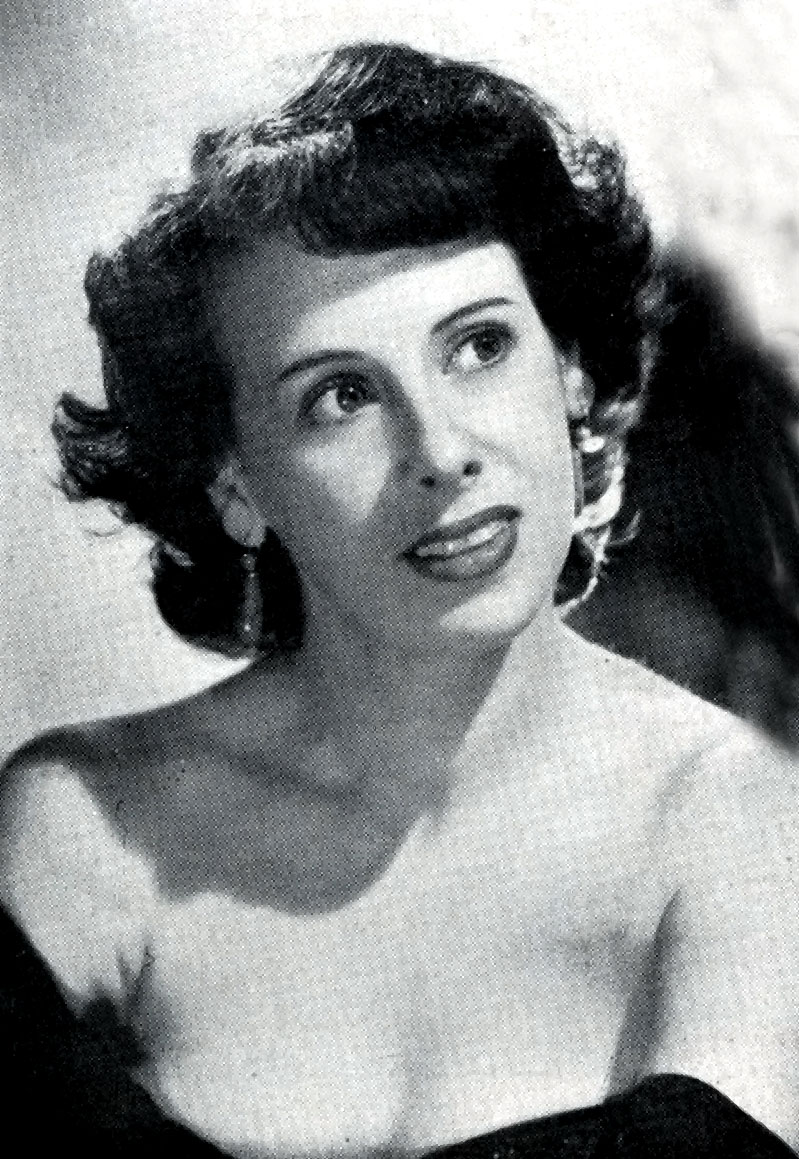
- Uteri in 1953
- Born: 19 May 1918; Caltagirone (Sicily, Italy])
- Died: 16 June 2018 (aged 100); Milan, Italy
- Other name: Clara Auteri Pepe
- Occupation: Film actress
- Years active: 1941–1976

Clara Auteri Pepe (19 May 1918 – 16 June 2018) was an Italian film actress. She was born Clara Auteri and later married to fellow actor Domenico Nico Pepe since 1937, but they divorced, and he remarried later on.

== Selected filmography ==
- Doctor, Beware (1941) as Giuseppina
- A Garibaldian in the Convent (1942) as Geltrude Corbetti
- The Countess of Castiglione (1942) as Martina
- The Beggar's Daughter (1950)
- La paura fa 90 (1951) as great-granddaughter of count François Champignon
- The Merchant of Venice (1953) as Nerissa
- La cambiale (1959) as the Dressmaker
- Some Like It Cold (1960) as the doorkeeper at Tittozzi's
