= Psychopath (1968 film) =

1968 film

- Italian film poster for Psychopath
- Directed by: Guido Zurli
- Screenplay by: Enzo Gicca Palli; Arpad De Riso
- Produced by: Theo Maria Werner; Ralph Zucker
- Starring: George Martin; Ingrid Schoeller; Karin Field; Paolo Carlini; Andrea Aureli
- Cinematography: Franco Villa
- Edited by: Romeo Ciatti
- Music by: Gino Peguri
- Production companies: Cinesecolo S.r.l.; Rekord Film; Cine Teatri; Parnass-Film GmbH
- Release dates: 15 April 1968 (Italy); 25 April 1969 (Germany)
- Countries: Italy; West Germany

Psychopath (Italian: Sigpress contro Scotland Yard, German: Mister Zehn Prozent - Miezen und Moneten) is a 1968 film directed by Guido Zurli.

== Plot ==
Sigpress is a professional thief who steals jewels which he then returns to the owners in order to collect money as a reward. He is being tracked by Scotland Yard when he learns that the gem called the Eye of Allah is being escorted from London to Paris. On attempting to steal the jewel, he finds it's a fake which leads to his own investigation.

== Cast ==
- George Martin as Sigpress
- Ingrid Schoeller as Marielle
- Karin Field as Priscilla
- Paolo Carlini as Inspector Bennet
- Andrea Aureli as Thamistokles Niorkos
- Gloria Paul as nightclub dancer
- Nick Jordan as Pedro
- Klaus Kinski as Periwinkle
- Artemio Antonini
- Giorgio Bixio

== Production ==
Psychopath's script is credited to Theo Maria Werner and Arpad De Riso. It was actually written by Riso and an uncredited Enzo Gicca Palli. Werner Hauff and Zurli are also credited as co-writers but accordingly to Zurli, their presence was nominal and only added per co-production needs.

Guido Zurli was aware of cast member Klaus Kinski's behavior on set, and devised a plan to keep him behaved. When becoming aware that he was approaching the set, Zurli began acting mad by throwing way the script, yelling and kicking floodlights. This was a plan to have Kinski believe that he was even more outrageous than he could be.

The film was shot in Rome, London and Paris.

== Release ==
Psychopath was released in Italy on 15 April 1968. It was shown in Germany on 25 April 1969. In Germany a novelization of the film was written by Mike Widborg (Peter Leukefeld) and published by Moewig under the title Mister 10% in 1969.

== Reception ==
Italian film historian and critic Roberto Curti found the film "ultimately quite enjoyable" and opined that it "has an ironic punch with most of its contemporaries lacked"

== See also ==
- Klaus Kinski filmography
- List of Italian films of 1968
- List of German films of the 1960s
