= Sangue di zingara =

1956 film

- Directed by: Maria Basaglia
- Written by: Marcello Albani; Maria Basaglia
- Starring: Maria Piazzai; Eloisa Cianni; Gino Leurini
- Cinematography: Domenico Scala
- Music by: Michele Cozzoli
- Release date: 1956
- Country: Italy
- Language: Italian

Sangue di zingara ("Gipsy's blood") is a 1956 Italian melodrama film co-written and directed by Maria Basaglia.

== Cast ==
- Maria Piazzai as Teodora
- Eloisa Cianni as Celeste
- Gino Leurini as Donato
- Maurizio Arena as Tore
- Olga Solbelli as Donato's mother
- Aldo Silvani as Don Luigi
- Nada Cortese as Rosa

== See also ==
- List of Italian films of 1956
