= Antonella Della Porta =

Italian actress (1927–2002)

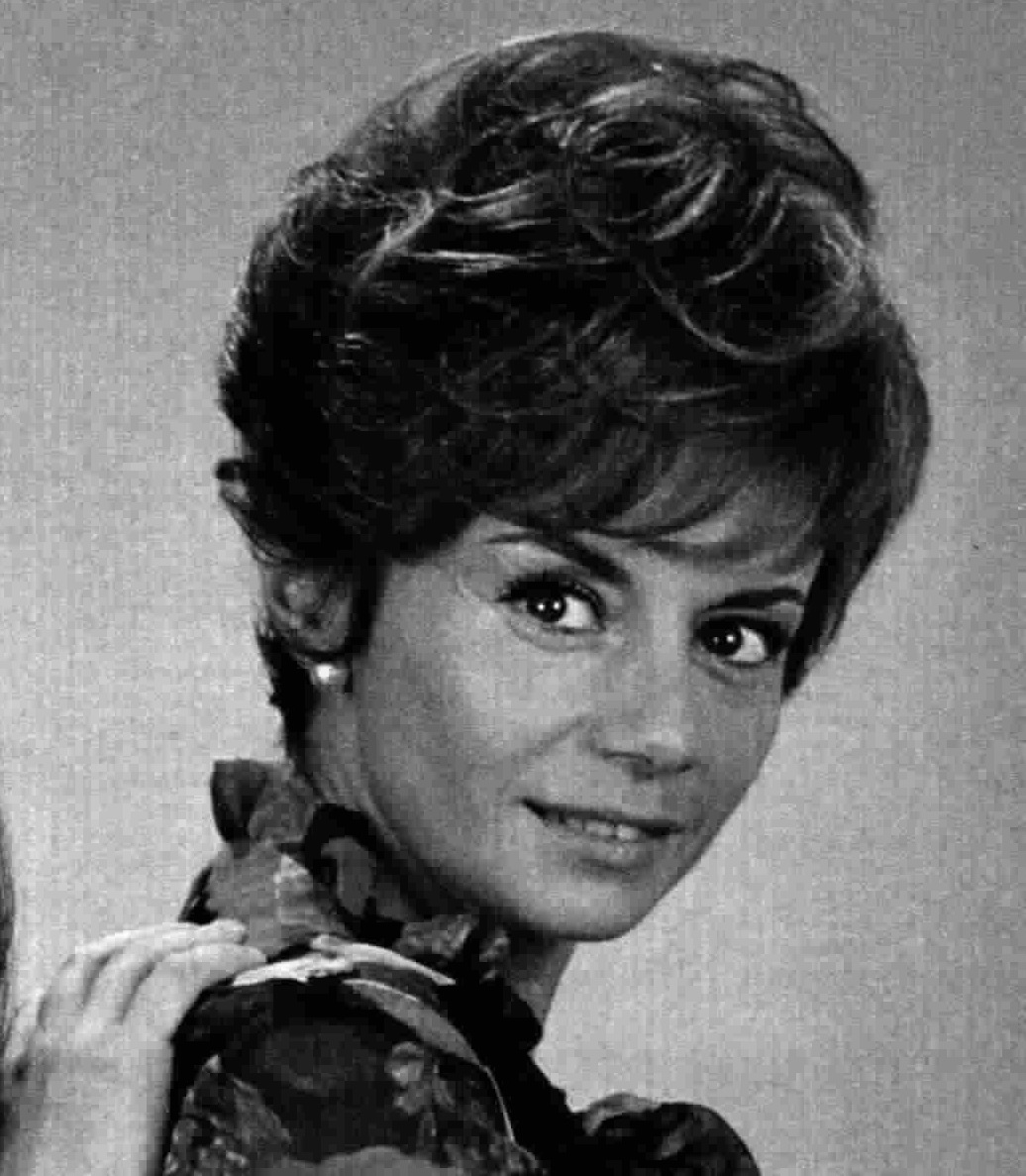
- Antonella Della Porta
- Born: August 18, 1927; Reggio Calabria, Italy
- Died: July 16, 2002 (aged 74); Rome, Italy
- Occupation: Actress

Antonella Della Porta (August 18, 1927 Reggio Calabria, Italy – July 16, 2002 Rome, Italy) was an Italian actress active in cinema and television in the early 1960s and the second half of the 1970s.

== Filmography ==
=== Cinema ===
- Difendo il mio amore (1957)
- Two Women (1960)
- Ghosts of Rome (1961)
- The Witch's Curse (1962)
- The Four Days of Naples (1962)
- Romeo and Juliet (1964)
- Weekend, Italian Style (1965)
- Maigret a Pigalle (1966)
- The Head of the Family (1967)
- Operation St. Peter's (1967)
- The Heroin Busters (1977)
