= Marina Berti =

Italian actress (1924–2002)

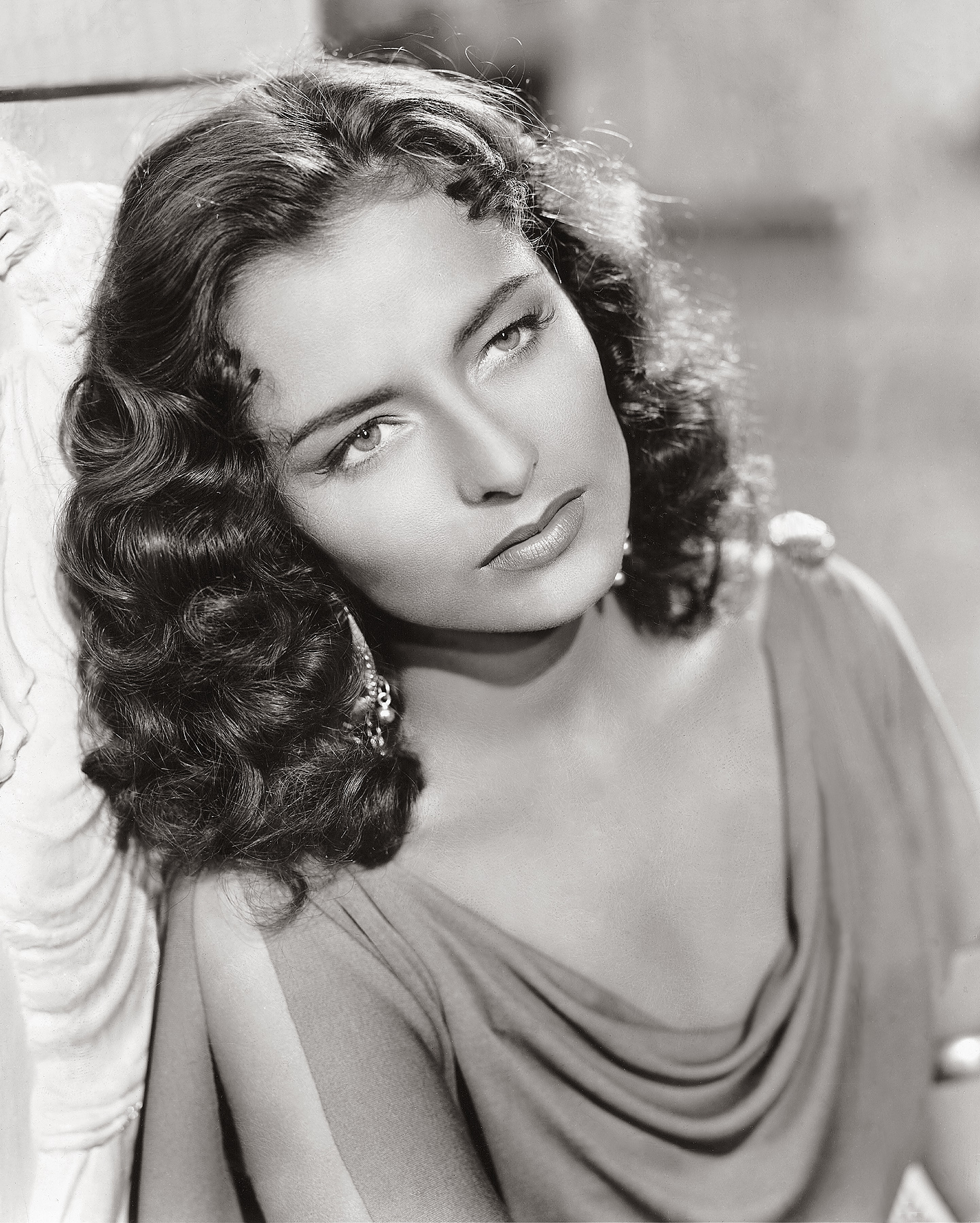
- Berti in 1951
- Born: Elena Maureen Bertolino; 29 September 1924; London, England, UK
- Died: 29 October 2002 (aged 78); Rome, Italy
- Resting place: Cimitero Flaminio, Rome
- Years active: 1941–2002
- Spouse: Claudio Gora (m. 1944; died 1998)
- Children: 5, including Andrea and Marina Giordana

Elena Maureen Bertolino (29 September 1924 – 29 October 2002), known professionally as Marina Berti, was an Italian film actress.

== Biography ==
Berti was born in London, England to an Italian father and an English mother.

Her first screen appearance was in the Anna Magnani film, La Fuggitiva in 1941. She appeared mainly in small roles and in the occasional leading role in nearly 100 films both Italian and American. Her appearances include Quo Vadis (1951), Abdulla the Great (1955), Ben Hur (1959), Cleopatra (1963), If It's Tuesday, This Must Be Belgium (1969), What Have They Done to Your Daughters? (1974), Last Stop on the Night Train (1975), and the TV miniseries' Moses the Lawgiver (1975) and Jesus of Nazareth (1977). Her last film appearance was in the Costa-Gavras film Amen. in 2002.

She was married to the Italian actor Claudio Gora from 1944 until his death in 1998. She is the mother of actor Andrea Giordana and actress Marina Giordana.

Berti died in 2002 in a Rome hospital after a long illness.

== Selected filmography ==
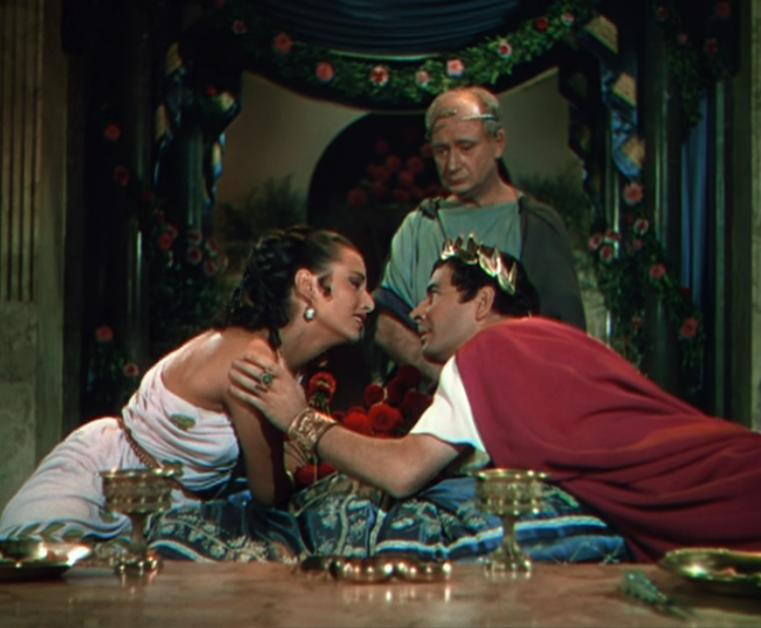
Berti and Leo Genn in the trailer for Quo Vadis

=== Cinema ===
- La fuggitiva (1941) - Lucia, l'assistente di Lia (uncredited)
- Divieto di sosta (1941)
- Giacomo the Idealist (1943) - Celestina
- The Valley of the Devil (1943) - Greta Hansel
- La primadonna (1943) - Ester
- La storia di una capinera (1943) - Maria Anselmi
- The Mountain Woman (1944) - Zosi
- The Gates of Heaven (1945) - La crocerossina
- The Ten Commandments (1945) - (segment "Non desiderare la roba d'altri")
- The Testimony (1946) - Linda
- Notte di tempesta (1946) - Caterina
- Fatal Symphony (1947)- Mirella
- Love Prelude (1947) - Anna
- Veglia nella notte (1948)
- The Earth Cries Out (1949) - Dina
- Prince of Foxes (1949) - Angela Borgia
- Sicilian Uprising (1949) - Laura
- The Sky Is Red (1950) - Carla
- Deported (1950) - Gina Carapia
- Hearts at Sea (1950) - (uncredited)
- Il sentiero dell'odio (1950)
- Up Front (1951) - Emi Rosso
- The Black Captain (1951) - Barbara Vivaldi
- Quo Vadis (1951) - Eunice, Petronius' Spanish slavegirl
- Operation Mitra (1951)
- The Queen of Sheba (1952) - Zamira, betrothed of Rehoboam
- Red Love (1952) - Marianna Sirca
- La colpa di una madre (1952) - Alma
- Carne inquieta (1952) - Fema Ferrara
- Eager to Live (1953) - Lucia
- At the Edge of the City (1953) - Luisa
- Casta Diva (1954) - Beatrice Turina
- Knights of the Queen (1954) - Jacqueline Planchet
- Abdulla the Great (1955) - Aziza
- Faccia da mascalzone (1956)
- Marie Antoinette Queen of France (1956) - Comtesse de Polignac
- Il canto dell'emigrante (1956) - Mara
- The Knight of the Black Sword (1956) - Contessa Laura
- Le avventure di Roby e Buck (1957)
- Ben Hur (1959) - Flavia (uncredited)
- Un eroe del nostro tempo (1960)
- Madame Sans-Gêne (1962) - Elisa Bonaparte
- Jessica (1962) - Filippella Risino
- Damon and Pythias (1962) - Mereka - Nerissa's Friend
- Swordsman of Siena (1962) - Countess of Osta
- Cleopatra (1963) - Queen at Tarsus (uncredited)
- A Face in the Rain (1963) - Anna
- Monsieur (1964) - Madame Danoni
- The Consequences (1964) - Elena
- Made in Italy (1965) - Bored Diner (segment "1 'Usi e costumi', episode 1")
- An Angel for Satan (1966) - Illa
- The Stranger Returns (aka A Man, a Horse, a Gun) (1967) - Ethel
- Every Man Is My Enemy (1967) - Ann
- Temptation (1969)
- If It's Tuesday, This Must Be Belgium (1969) - Gina
- Hate Is My God (1969) - Blanche Durand
- Dead End (1969) - Mother of Sergio
- Cran d'arrêt (1970) - La soeur d'Alberta
- Lady Caliph (1970) - Clementine Doberdò - la moglie di Annibale
- Tre nel mille (1971)
- Planet Venus (1972)
- Buona parte di Paolina (1973) - madame de Chambaudoin
- What Have They Done to Your Daughters? (1974) - Mrs. Polvesi
- The Divine Nymph (1974–1975) - Manoela's Aunt
- Night Train Murders (1975) - Laura Stradi - madre di una delle vittime
- Don Milani (1976) - La professoressa
- The Red Carnation (1976)
- A Spiral of Mist (1977) - Constanza San Germano
- The Repenter (1985)
- L'ultima mazurka (1986) - Signora in treno
- La posta in gioco (1988) - Luigina, Mario Bellomo's wife
- Stuborn Fate (1992) - Eva Meyer
- From the Other Side of the World (Dall'altra parte del mondo, 1992)
- Amen. (2002) - La Principessa (final film role)

=== Television ===
- Le avventure dei tre moschettieri (1957 series) - Jacqueline Planchet
- La Pisana (1960 miniseries)
- Moses the Lawgiver (1975 miniseries) - Eliseba
- Jesus of Nazareth (1977 miniseries) - Elizabeth
