= Otello Toso =

Italian film and stage actor

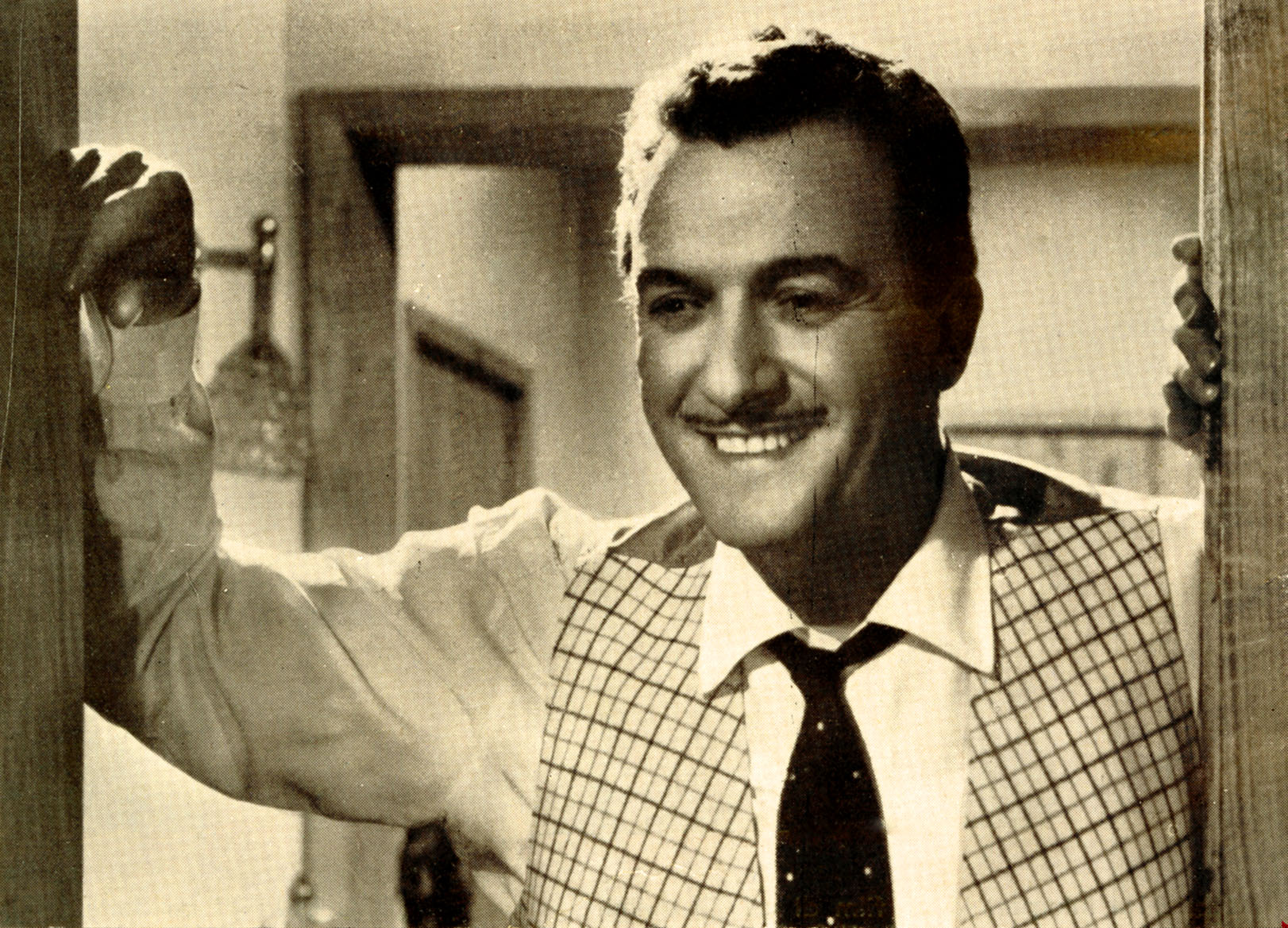
- Born: 22 February 1914; Padua, Italy
- Died: 15 March 1966 (aged 52); Pieve di Curtarolo, Italy
- Occupation: Actor

Otello Toso (22 February 1914 – 15 March 1966) was an Italian film and stage actor.

Born in Padua, Toso graduated from the Centro Sperimentale di Cinematografia in 1939 and almost immediately started his film career. He was particularly prolific in the 1940s, in films in which he usually starred negative characters. After World War II Toso mostly starred in melodramas and genre films, except for Juan Antonio Bardem's Death of a Cyclist. He died at 52 in a car accident in Pieve di Curtarolo, near Padua.

== Selected filmography ==
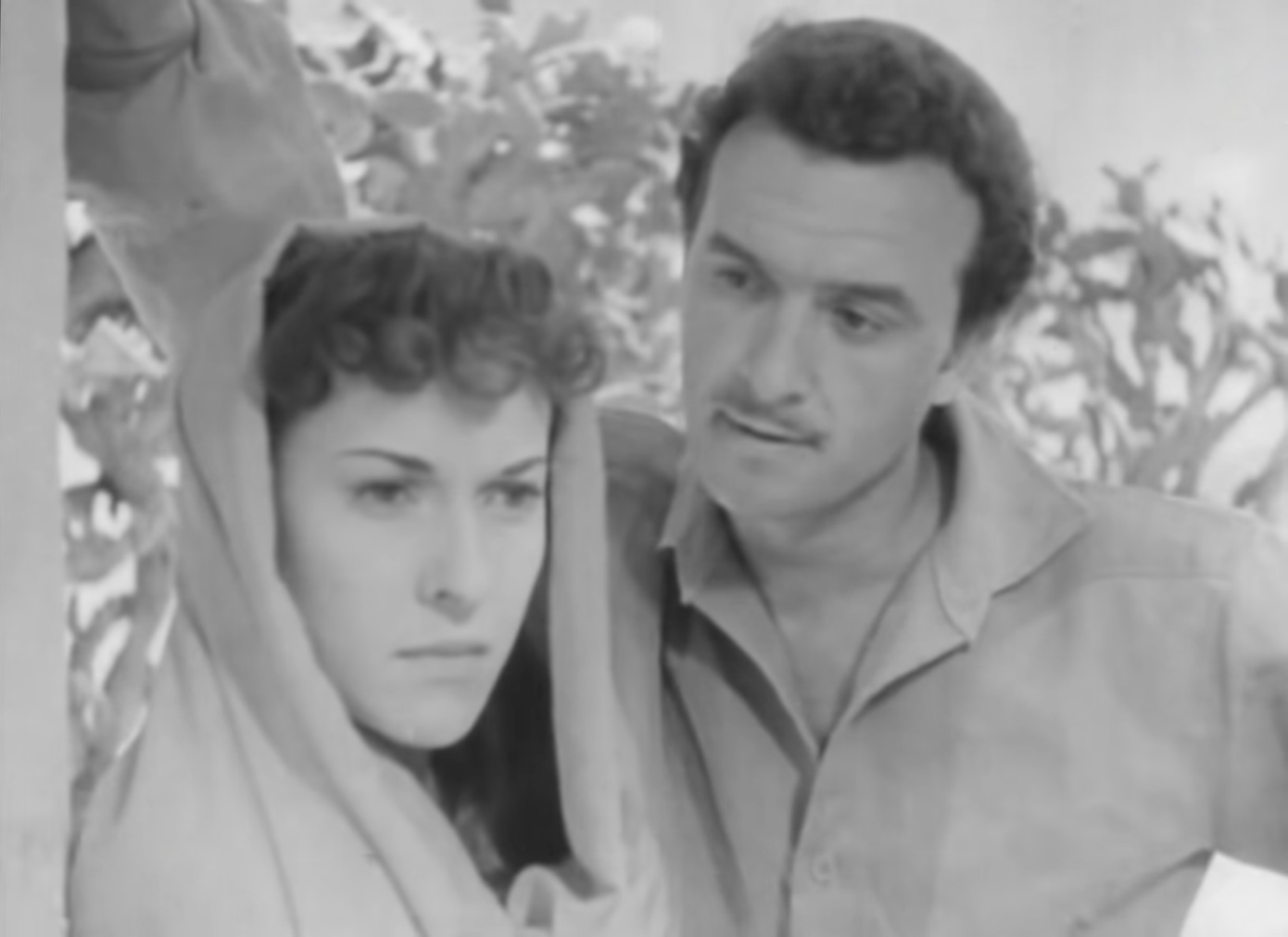
Mariella Lotti and Otello Toso in a scene from the Italian film Malacarne (1946)

- 1860 (1933) – Piemontese soldier
- The Canal of the Angels (1934)
- Giuseppe Verdi (1938) – Un ammiratore di Verdi al caffè
- Jeanne Doré (1938) – Extra in ball scene
- Ettore Fieramosca (1938) – Un compagno d'arme Gentilino
- Inventiamo l'amore (1938) – Il primo giocatore di biliardo (uncredited)
- Crispino e la comare (1938)
- Io, suo padre (1939)
- Le père Lebonnard (1939) – Gaetano (uncredited)
- Ultima giovinezza (1939)
- Follie del secolo (1939) – Jean Kennedy, il violonista
- The Last Enemy (1940) – Enzo
- Il ponte dei sospiri (1940) – Rolando Candiano
- La granduchessa si diverte (1940) – Maurizio
- Ridi pagliaccio (1941) – Giorgio Veri
- Brivido (1941)
- Pirates of Malaya (1941) – Il tenente Schmidt
- Tentazione (1941) – Lorenzo Wendich, l'ingegnere
- Le signorine della villa accanto (1942) – Suo nipote
- Soltanto un bacio (1942) – Gianni Astolfi
- The Two Orphans (1942) – Giacomo
- Yellow Hell (1942) – Giorgio
- The Woman of Sin (1942) – Suo marito
- Special Correspondents (1943) – Renato Marini
- Vietato ai minorenni (1944) – Barra
- Mist on the Sea (1944) – Il dottore Leonardo Monti
- The Ten Commandments (1945) – (segment "Non rubare")
- Two Anonymous Letters (1945) – Tullio
- Fuga nella tempesta (1945) – Assassino
- La sua strada (1946) – Il giovanetto
- For the Love of Mariastella (1946) – Turi della Tonnara, detto 'Malacarne'
- Vanity (1947)
- Il corriere di ferro (1947) – L'aviatore italo-americano
- Il principe ribelle (1947)
- I cavalieri dalle maschere nere (1948) – Blasco di Castiglione
- Faddija – La legge della vendetta (1950) – Michele
- Captain Demonio (1950)
- Santo disonore (1950) – Alfredo
- Cavalcade of Heroes (1950) – Angelo Masina
- Alina (1950) – Marco
- Verginità (1951) – Giancarlo
- Revenge of a Crazy Girl (1951) – Carlo
- Black Fire (1951) – Stefano
- The Cliff of Sin (1951)
- What Price Innocence? (1952) – Stefano Rella
- La voce del sangue (1952) – Carlo Mattei
- Rimorso (1952)
- La colpa di una madre (1952) – Mr. Herbert
- Er fattaccio (1952) – Bruno
- Carcerato (1953) – Marco
- Una donna prega (1953) – Giulio Aureli
- Desiderio 'e sole (1954) – Count Sergio Sirovich
- Letter from Naples (1954) – Álvaro Ramírez
- Tears of Love (1954) – Davide Montalto
- Piscatore 'e Pusilleco (1954) – Walter
- Bertoldo, Bertoldino e Cacasenno (1954) – Lord Wilmore
- La trovatella di Milano (1955) – Miguel Castro
- The Knight of the Black Sword (1956) – Marchese Altamura
- Tormento d'amore (1956) – Luigi
- Amaramente (1956) – Andrea
- La trovatella di Milano (1956) – Count Giorgio Patti
- Onore e sangue (1957) – Arturo Ferretti
- Il Conte di Matera (1958) – Count Rambaldo Tramontana di Casamaiora
- Desert Desperadoes (1959) – Verrus
- Il peccato degli anni verdi (1960) – Elena Giordani's Father
- Pulcinella, cetrulo di Acerra (1961)
- Planets Against Us (I pianeti contro di noi) (1962) – Maj. Michelotti
