= Carcerato (1951 film) =

- Directed by: Armando Grottini
- Written by: Gigi Pisano
- Produced by: Fortunato Misiano
- Starring: Franca Marzi; Otello Toso
- Cinematography: Giuseppe La Torre
- Edited by: Otello Colangeli
- Release date: 1951
- Country: Italy
- Language: Italian

Carcerato is a 1951 Italian melodrama film directed by Armando Grottini (credited as Armando Zorri).

== Cast ==
- Otello Toso
- Franca Marzi
- Barbara Florian
- Renato Baldini
- Nuccia Aronne
- Amedeo Trilli
- Franco Pesce
- Amalia Pellegrini
- Salvatore Cafiero
- Gigi Pisano
- Natale Cirino
