= Steve Barclay (actor) =

American actor

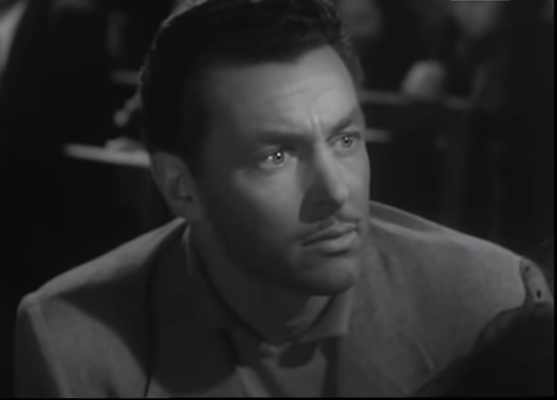
- Barclay in the 1953 film Noi peccatori
- Born: 20 November 1918; Baltimore, Maryland, U.S.
- Died: 2 February 1994 (aged 75); Rome, Lazio, Italy
- Occupations: Actor, producer
- Years active: 1943–1964 (film)

Stephen Barclay (20 November 1918, in Baltimore – 2 February 1994, in Rome) was an American film actor known for his work in Italy. He became a leading man in Italian films after working in numerous Westerns in Hollywood. He was married to actress Lyla Rocco (1954–1964) and later to former Miss France, Lisa Simon (née Liliane Czajka; 1935–2020).

== Filmography ==
Year	Title	Role	Notes
1943	The Iron Major	Football Player	Uncredited
1943	A Guy Named Joe	Flier	Uncredited
1944	Pride of the Plains	Sheriff Kenny Revere	
1944	The Fighting Sullivans	Naval Talkers	Uncredited
1944	See Here, Private Hargrove	Corporal	Uncredited
1944	Marine Raiders	A Soldier	Uncredited
1944	The Mummy's Ghost	Tom's Classmate	Uncredited
1944	Mr. Winkle Goes to War	Soldier Runner	Uncredited
1944	Thirty Seconds Over Tokyo	Pilot in Officers' Club	Uncredited
1944	Vigilantes of Dodge City	Captain James Glover	
1945	The Great Flamarion	Eddie Wheeler	
1945	It's a Pleasure	Man at Weinie Bake	Uncredited
1945	Utah	Man	Uncredited
1945	A Sporting Chance	Ted Cummings	
1945	Don't Fence Me In	Tracy	
1945	Girls of the Big House	Smiley Gordon	
1945	They Were Expendable	Naval Officer	Uncredited
1946	Garota do Barulho	M.P.	Uncredited
1946	G.I. War Brides	Lt. Cooley	Uncredited
1946	Landrush	Bruce Landy	
1946	Landrush	Kirby Garvey	Uncredited
1949	Sicilian Uprising	Cap. Droet	
1950	The Beggar's Daughter	Franco	
1951	The Black Captain	Marco Adinolfi	
1951	Operation Mitra	Stefano Carli	
1952	Finishing School	George Whitmore	
1953	Woman of the Red Sea	Paolo	
1953	Noi peccatori	Stefano	
1953	Nero and the Burning of Rome	Conduttore della biga	
1953	The Three Musketeers	Georges Villiers, duc de Buckingham	
1956	The Knight of the Black Sword	Marco	

== Bibliography ==
- Goble, Alan. The Complete Index to Literary Sources in Film. Walter de Gruyter, 1999.
