= The Knight of the Black Sword =

1956 film

- Directed by: László Kish; Luigi Capuano
- Written by: Alberto D'Amario; Franco Perroni; Gino Visentini
- Produced by: Fortunato Misiano
- Starring: Marina Berti; Steve Barclay; Otello Toso
- Cinematography: Augusto Tiezzi
- Edited by: Renato Scandolo
- Music by: Carlo Innocenzi
- Production company: Romana Film
- Release date: 1956
- Running time: 88 minutes
- Country: Italy
- Language: Italian

The Knight of the Black Sword (Italian: Il cavaliere dalla spada nera) is a 1956 Italian historical adventure film directed by László Kish and Luigi Capuano and starring Marina Berti, Steve Barclay and Otello Toso.

The film's sets were designed by Alfredo Montori.

== Cast ==
- Marina Berti as Contessa Laura
- Steve Barclay as Marco
- Otello Toso as Marchese Altamura
- Fulvia Franco as Livia
- Gianni Baghino as Luca
- Luigi Tosi as Barone Acquaviva
- Carlo Lamas as Visconte Poggiorosso
- Carlo Tamberlani as Antonio
- Rita Rosa as Grazia
- Margherita Bossi as La Governante
- Amina Pirani Maggi as La madre di Marco
- Enzo Fiermonte as Mario
- Piero Palermini as Ludovico
- Piero Pastore as Sebastiano
- Flora Carosello as Cuoca della taverna
- Natale Cirino as Paolo
- Zulina Badaloni as La zia di Ludovico
- Rodolfo Lodi as Gaspare
- Nerio Bernardi as Conte Roccofiorita
- Giuseppe Chinnici as Oste
- Dina De Santis as Dama alla battuta di caccia
- Pino Sciacqua as Aquaviva's Servant
- Gino Scotti as Priest
- Nazzareno Zamperla

== Bibliography ==
- Roberto Chiti & Roberto Poppi. Dizionario del cinema italiano. Gremese Editore, 1991.
