= Brunella Bovo =

Italian actress (1932–2017)

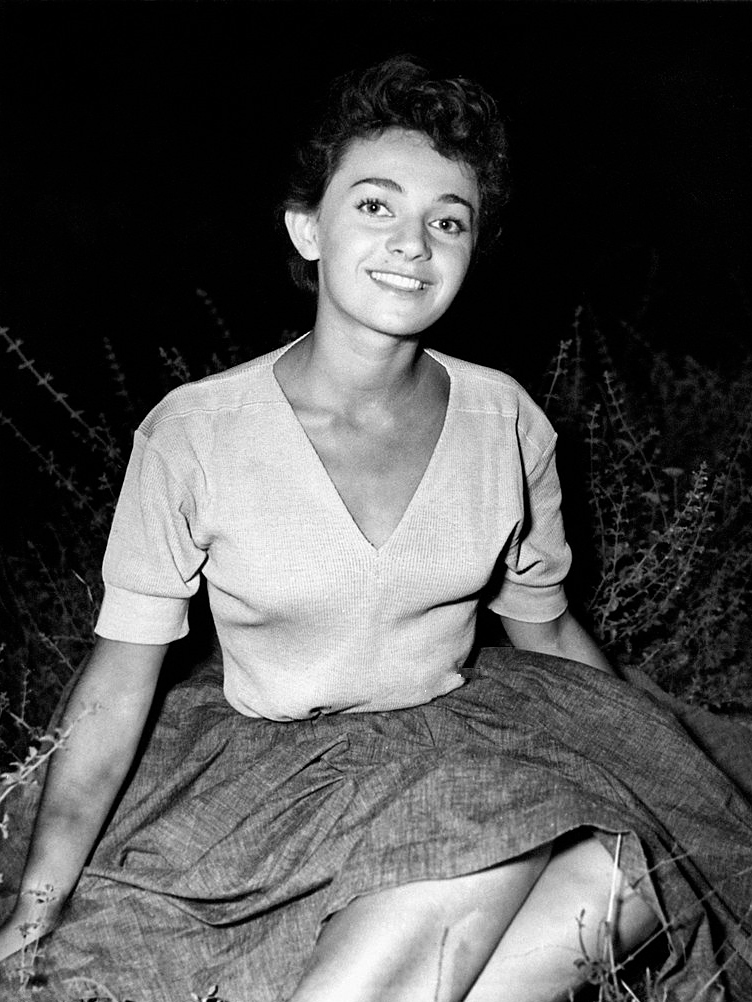
- Bovo in the 1950s
- Born: 4 March 1932; Padua, Kingdom of Italy
- Died: 21 February 2017 (aged 84); Rome, Italy
- Other name: Barbara Hudson
- Occupation: Actress

Brunella Bovo (4 March 1932 – 21 February 2017) was an Italian film actress.

== Life and career ==
Born in Padua, Italy, after having had her film debut with a minor role in Ho sognato il paradiso and after having not been admitted to the Centro Sperimentale di Cinematografia, in 1951 Bovo had her breakthrough role winning the audition for the role of the awkward homeless Edvige in Vittorio De Sica's neorealist fantasy-comedy Miracle in Milan.

One year later she got an equally important role, the newlywed dreamer Wanda in Federico Fellini's The White Sheik. Despite the popularity gained with her early roles, her career continued mainly in B-movies, in which she was sometimes credited as Barbara Hudson. She was also active in television dramas. Her sister, Mariolina, was also an actress.

== Death ==
On 21 February 2017, Brunella Bovo died in Rome, aged 84.

== Selected filmography ==
- Miracle in Milan (1951)
- The White Sheik (1952)
- Revenge of a Crazy Girl (1952)
- Finishing School (1953)
- Dieci canzoni d'amore da salvare (1953)
- The Loves of Salammbo (1960)
