= Alan Furlan =

Italian-American actor (1920–1997)

- Born: Aleardo Furlan; 13 April 1920; Farla, Italy
- Died: 14 May 1997 (aged 77); Winchester, Virginia, United States

Alan Furlan (13 April 1920 – 14 May 1997) was an Italian-American actor.

== Biography ==
Born Aleardo Furlan in Farla, in the North Friuli region of Italy, Furlan acted in films in Europe and the United States, on Broadway and in commercials.

On Broadway he appeared in productions such as Holiday for Lovers (1957), The Best House in Naples (1956), Idiot's Delight (1951) and Romeo and Juliet (1951) starring Olivia de Havilland. In the late 1940s, he performed in Chicago area summer stock theaters with actors such as Richard Kiley.

Furlan played the role of Giancarlo in the Italian film Donatella (1956) which was selected for competition at the Berlin Film Festival. He appeared in numerous live broadcast anthology drama television series with lead roles in episodes of Police Call, one of the top grossing television series released in 1955, as well as a supporting role in the Producers' Showcase production (1957) of the melodramatic comedic Broadway play The Great Sebastians, starring Alfred Lunt and Lynn Fontanne and the Armstrong Circle Theatre episode The Sound of Violence: The Jukebox Racket (1959).

He toured with Mae West as her Latin lover in Come On Up, Ring Twice and performed in the TV version of the Moon and Sixpence with Laurence Olivier (1959).

Furlan later became the mentor of Wisconsin's Sunset Playhouse where he remained artistic director for 28 years.

== Personal life ==
He was married to Mary Lake and they had a daughter Nicola Lea.

== Filmography ==
- Orient Express (1953, Episode: "His Son") (a.k.a. His Boy) as Marc
- La tua donna (1954)
- Police Call (1955, TV Series)
- Donatella (1956) as Giancarlo
- War and Peace (1956) as Russian Officer (uncredited)
- Defend My Love (1956) (a.k.a. Difendo il mio amore) (original title Italy) as Il direttore del giornale
- I tre moschettieri (1956, TV Series) (a.k.a. The Three Musketeers) (USA title) as Sasquinet
- Producers' Showcase (1957, Episode: "The Great Sebastians") as Paviat
- Armstrong Circle Theatre (1959, Episode: "The Sound of Violence: The Jukebox Racket") as Charlie Williams
- The Sinner (1959) (a.k.a. La peccatrice del deserto) (original title Italy) (a.k.a. Desert Desperados) (USA title) as Rais (final film role)

== Broadway stage work ==
- Romeo and Juliet (1951)
- Idiot's Delight (1951)
- The Best House in Naples (1956)
- Holiday for Lovers (1957)
