= Franca Marzi =

Italian actress (1926–1989)

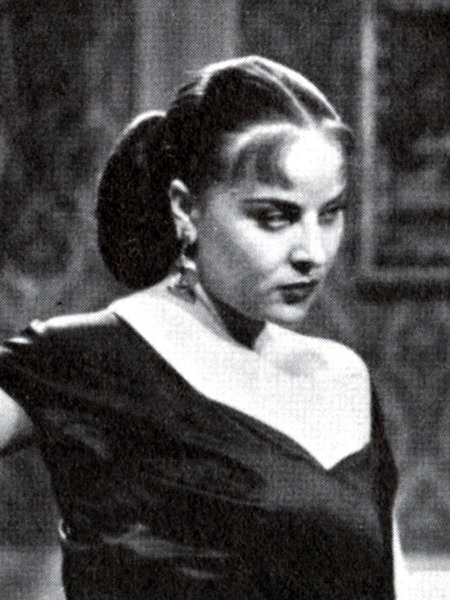
- Marzi in 1949
- Born: 18 August 1926; Rome, Kingdom of Italy
- Died: 6 March 1989 (aged 62); Cinisello Balsamo, Milan, Italy
- Occupation: Actress
- Years active: 1943–1977

Franca Marzi (18 August 1926 – 6 March 1989) was an Italian film actress. She appeared in 80 films between 1943 and 1977.

== Life and career ==
Born in Rome as Francesca Marsi, after working in the revue, Marzi made her film debut in her early twenties, in The Lovers (1946) by Giacomo Gentilomo. She was usually cast in roles of provocative women and femme fatales in films of sentimental or comic genre. The only exception was the Federico Fellini's drama Nights of Cabiria (1957), in which she played the role of the prostitute Wanda, the best friend of Giulietta Masina, a role for which she was rewarded with the Silver Ribbon for Best Supporting Actress.

== Selected filmography ==
- Harlen (1943) – Una spettatrice al teatro
- The Lovers (1946) – Porzia
- Tombolo (1947) – Lidia
- The Two Orphans (1947) – Susanne de la Pleine
- Mad About Opera (1948) – Carmen
- L'isola di Montecristo (1948) – Lucy
- Letter at Dawn (1948) - Lilly – l'amante di Carlo
- Fear and Sand (1948) – Carmen
- Calamità d'oro (1948) – Rosetta 'Calamita d'oro'
- A Night of Fame (1949) – Flora
- Totò Le Mokò (1949) – Odette
- The Pirates of Capri (1949) – Carla
- Napoli eterna canzone (1949) – Stella Paris
- Maracatumba... ma non è una rumba! (1949) – Corinna Auselli, figlia del fattore
- La figlia del peccato (1949) – l'ex amante di Ernesto
- Ho sognato il paradiso (1950) – Collega di Maria
- Son of d'Artagnan (1950) – La Contessa
- Figaro Here, Figaro There (1950) – Consuelo
- Devotion (1950) – Zana, la vedova
- Beauties on Bicycles (1951) − Maria
- Arrivano i nostri (1951) − Gioia Chellis
- The Black Captain (1951)
- Milano miliardaria (1951) − Italia Furioni
- Verginità (1951) − Giulia
- Toto the Third Man (1951) − Teresa − la domestica di Paolo
- La vendetta del corsaro (1951)
- La paura fa 90 (1951) − Nanda Fougère
- Revenge of Black Eagle (1951) − Katia
- My Heart Sings (1951) − Gina
- Amor non ho! Però, però.. (1951)
- Vedi Napoli e poi muori (1951) − Wanda
- Tizio, Caio, Sempronio (1951) − Livia
- Santa Lucia Luntana (1951)
- Salvate mia figlia (1951) − Ex Amante di Andrea
- Lorenzaccio (1951) − Clarice
- La voce del sangue (1952)
- Sardinian Vendetta (1952) − Annesa Leoni
- The Black Mask (1952) − Henriette
- Tragic Return (1952) − Donna Carmela − Nicola's girlfriend
- At Sword's Edge (1952) − Rita
- They Were Three Hundred (1952) − Sina
- Final Pardon (1952)
- Non ho paura di vivere (1952)
- I, Hamlet (1952) − Valchiria
- I morti non pagano tasse (1952) − Mariella, la locandiera
- Delitto al luna park (1952) − Silvia
- I Piombi di Venezia (1953) − Fabia
- Cavallina storna (1953) − Donna Angela
- Carcerato (1953) − Valeria − matrigna di Luisa
- Riscatto (1953) − L'ostessa
- Fermi tutti... arrivo io! (1953) − Carmen
- Rivalità (1953) − Franca
- Lasciateci in pace (1953)
- Cavallina storna (1953) − Dalgisa
- Canzoni a due voci (1953) − Governante Franca
- Canto per te (1953) − Luciana
- The Island Monster (1954) − Gloria D'Auro
- Il cavaliere di Maison Rouge (1954)
- The Doctor of the Mad (1954) − La moglie di Cristaldi
- The Boatman of Amalfi (1954) − Cristina
- Orphan of the Ghetto (1954)
- Suor Maria (1955) − Assunta Ranieri
- La trovatella di Milano (1956)
- Nights of Cabiria (1957) − Wanda
- Fortunella (1958) − Amelia
- Girls for the Summer (1958) − Clara
- Ritrovarsi all'alba (1959) − Paola
- Il raccomandato di ferro (1959) − Tosca
- Gastone (1960) − Rosa
- Toto, Fabrizi and the Young People Today (1960) − Matilde Cocozza
- La contessa azzurra (1960) − Donna Carmela
- La garçonnière (1960) − Mother
- Ghosts of Rome (1961) − Nella
- Psycosissimo (1962) − Clotilde Scarponi
- The Man Who Burnt His Corpse (1964)
- Le tardone (1964) − Donna Carla (episode "Canto flamenco")
- Pardon, Are You For or Against? (1966) − Camilla
- Ecco noi per esempio... (1977)
