= Maria Basaglia =

Italian film director and screenwriter

- Born: 1912; Cremona, Italy
- Died: May 5, 1998 (aged 85–86)
- Occupations: Film director; Screenwriter; Dubbing director
- Years active: 1939–1956
- Known for: Sua altezza ha detto no (1953); Sangue di zingara (1956)
- Spouse: Marcello Albani

Maria Basaglia (1912 – 5 May 1998) was an Italian director and screenwriter.

== Life and career ==
Born in Cremona, Basaglia started her career as dubbing director for the production company Scalera Film. Between 1939 and 1944 she wrote several films, mainly collaborating with her husband Marcello Albani; during the war she moved to Venice, where she collaborated on several film productions of the short-lived Republic of Salo. After the war, Basaglia directed two films, the comedy Sua altezza ha detto no and the melodrama Sangue di zingara. In 1957 she moved with her husband to Brazil, where they founded the production company Paulistánia Film.

== Filmography ==
- Angelica, directed by Jean Choux (1939), screenwriter
- Ultima giovinezza, directed by Jeff Musso (1939), screenwriter
- Papà Lebonnard, directed by Marcello Albani (1939), screenwriter
- Boccaccio, directed by Marcello Albani (1940), screenwriter
- Il bazar delle idee, directed by Marcello Albani (1941), screenwriter
- Divieto di sosta, directed by Marcello Albani (1942), screenwriter
- Redenzione, directed by Marcello Albani (1942), screenwriter
- L'ultimo sogno, directed by Marcello Albani (1946), screenwriter
- Sua Altezza ha detto: no!, (1953), screenwriter and director
- Sangue di zingara, (1956), director
