= Pino Mercanti =

Italian film director and screenwriter

- Born: Giuseppe Mercanti; 16 February 1911; Palermo, Italy
- Died: 3 September 1986 (aged 75); Rome, Italy
- Other name: Joseph Trader
- Occupations: Director; Screenwriter

Giuseppe Mercanti, best known as Pino Mercanti (16 February 1911 – 3 September 1986), was an Italian film director and screenwriter.

== Life and career ==
Born in Palermo, Sicily, Mercanti was a pioneer of the Sicilian cinema as the leading filmmaker and the artistic director of the production company O.F.S. (a.k.a. Organizzazione Filmistica Siciliana), founded by the brothers Francesco and Girolamo Gorgone with the purpose of promoting the production of films on Sicilian soil. Following the bankruptcy of the company, Mercanti moved to Rome, where he directed a number of melodramas, adventure films, Spaghetti Westerns and other genre films, often international co-productions. He was sometimes credited as Joseph Trader.

== Selected filmography ==
- For the Love of Mariastella (1945)
- Rome, Free City (1946)
- I cavalieri dalle maschere nere (1948)
- Serenata amara (1952)
- La voce del sangue (1952)
- Revenge of a Crazy Girl (1952)
- I cinque dell'Adamello (1954)
- Tears of Love (1954)
- Primo applauso (1957)
- Knight of 100 Faces (1960)
- The Black Duke (1963)
- Gentlemen of the Night (1964)
- Three Dollars of Lead (1965)
- Special Code: Assignment Lost Formula (1966)
