= Romana Film =

Italian film production company, 1946–1960s

- Industry: film production
- Founded: 1946; 79 years ago
- Founder: Fortunato Misiano
- Defunct: late 1960s
- Fate: ceased production
- Headquarters: Rome, Italy

Romana Film was an Italian film production company. Founded in 1946 by the Sicilian Fortunato Misiano, the company was based in Rome. It made films in a variety of popular genres such as Swashbucklers, Peplum and Eurospy films, turning out roughly a hundred films before the company ceased production in the late 1960s.

== Selected filmography ==
- Baron Carlo Mazza (1948)
- What Price Innocence? (1952)
- Heads or Tails (1969)
