= Carolina Invernizio =

Italian novelist (1851–1916)

Carolina Invenizio
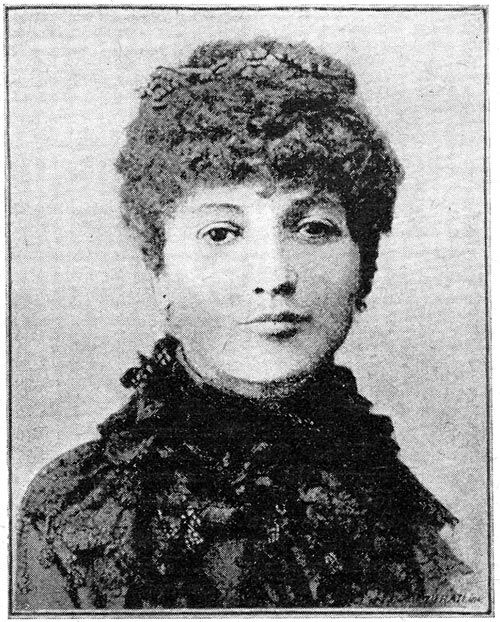
- Born: Carolina Maria Margarita Invernizio; 28 March 1851; Voghera, Italy
- Died: 27 November 1916 (aged 65); Cuneo, Italy
- Occupation: Writer

Carolina Maria Margarita Invernizio (28 March 1851 – 27 November 1916), better known just as Carolina Invenizio, was an Italian novelist. She had a large popular success between late 1800s until her death.

== Biography ==
=== Early life ===
Invenizio was born in Voghera, the daughter of an official of the Kingdom of Sardinia. She long claimed her date of birth as 1858, but in 1983 after extensive research in the municipal registers, her birth year was eventually determined to be 1851.

In 1865 she moved with her family to Florence, where she studied at the Istituto Magistrale.

=== Career ===
Invenizio made her writing debut in 1876, with the short story Un autore drammatico. In 1877 she published her first novel, Rina o L'angelo delle Alpi.

Invernizio wrote about 150 novels and 20 collections of novelle, as well as four books of fiction for children. Influenced by feuilleton literature, she had an enormous popular following with her novels characterized by sensationalist, melodramatic and often gothic themes. She was often badly received by critics, and Antonio Gramsci referred to her as an "old trooper" and an "honest hen", eventually regretting these remarks.

=== Personal life ===
In 1881, aged 30 years old, Invenizio married a Bersaglieri lieutenant, Marcello Quinterno, and at 35 years old she had her only daughter, Marcella. She followed her husband during his deployments, moving to Turin and Cuneo, among other cities.
