= Catherine of Russia (film) =

- Directed by: Umberto Lenzi
- Screenplay by: Umberto Lenzi; Guido Maletesta
- Story by: Steven Luotto; Alfonso Brescia
- Produced by: Fortunato Misiano
- Starring: Hildegard Knef; Sergio Fantoni; Giacomo Rossi Stuart
- Cinematography: Augusto Tiezzi
- Edited by: Jolanda Benvenuti
- Music by: Angelo Francesco Lavagnino
- Production companies: Romano Film; Societe Nouvelle de Cinematographi; Zagreb Film
- Release date: 12 January 1963 (Italy)
- Countries: Italy; France; Yugoslavia

Catherine of Russia (Italian: Caterina di Russia) is a 1963 biographical drama film directed by Umberto Lenzi, and starring Hildegard Knef.

== Cast ==
- Hildegard Knef as Catherine the Great
- Sergio Fantoni as Orlov
- Giacomo Rossi Stuart as Count Poniatowski
- Raoul Grassilli as Czar Peter III
- Angela Cavo as Anna
- Ennio Balbo as Count Panin
- Enzo Fiermonte as General Munic
- Tina Lattanzi as Czarina Elizabeth
- Tullio Altamura as Latouche

== Release ==
Catherine of Russia was released in Italy on 12 January 1963.
