= Giant of the Evil Island =

Il mistero dell'isola maledetta
- Directed by: Piero Pierotti
- Produced by: Fortunato Misiano
- Cinematography: Augusto Tiezzi
- Music by: Angelo Francesco Lavagnino
- Release date: 1965
- Country: Italy
- Language: Italian

Il mistero dell'isola maledetta, internationally released as Giant of the Evil Island, is a 1965 Italian adventure film.

== Cast ==
- Peter Lupus as Pedro Valverde (as Rock Stevens)
- Halina Zalewska as Dona Alma Morales
- Arturo Dominici as Don Alvarado
- Monique Renaud as Consuelo
- Nello Pazzafini as Malik (as Ted Carter)
- Dina De Santis as Blanca
- Amedeo Trilli as Capt. José Rivera (as Mike Moore)
- Loris Gizzi as The Doctor
- Nando Angelini as Ramon
- Nino Vingelli as Tortilla
- Attilio Dottesio as Lt. Esteban
- Salvatore Borghese as Crow, pirate
- Ignazio Balsamo as Navarro
