= Hercules and the Black Pirates =

- Directed by: Luigi Capuano
- Written by: Arpad DeRiso; Piero Pierotti
- Produced by: Fortunato Misiano
- Starring: Alan Steel
- Cinematography: Augusto Tiezzi
- Edited by: Franco Fraticelli
- Music by: Angelo Francesco Lavagnino
- Release date: 1963
- Country: Italy
- Language: Italian

Hercules and the Black Pirates (Italian: Sansone contro il corsaro nero/ Samson Against the Black Pirate), also known as Hercules and the Pirates and Hercules and the Black Pirate, is a 1963 Italian pirate-peplum film directed by Luigi Capuano and starring Alan Steel.

== Cast ==
- Alan Steel as Hercules/ Samson
- Rosalba Neri as Rosita
- Piero Lulli as Rodrigo Sanchez
- Andrea Aureli as The Black Corsair
- Elisa Mainardi as Carmelita
- Nerio Bernardi as Governor of Hermosa
- Cinzia Bruno as Alma
- Nello Pazzafini as The Black Corsair's Henchman
- Enzo Maggio
- Anna Arena
- Ignazio Balsamo
