= Hercules Against Rome =

- Directed by: Piero Pierotti
- Screenplay by: Arpad DeRiso; Piero Pierotti
- Story by: Arpad DeRiso; Nino Scolaro
- Produced by: Fortunato Misiano
- Starring: Alan Steel; Wandisa Guida; Livio Lorenzon; Daniele Vargas; Andrea Aureli
- Cinematography: Augusto Tiezzi
- Edited by: Jolanda Benvenuti
- Music by: Angelo Francesco Lavagnino
- Production companies: Romana Film; Regina Films; SFF Alfred Rose
- Release date: 15 May 1964 (Italy)
- Running time: 94 minutes
- Countries: Italy; France

Hercules Against Rome (Italian: Ercole contro Roma) is a 1964 Sword-and-sandal film directed by Piero Pierotti.

== Plot ==
A childhood friend enlists Hercules to protect the Roman Emperor Gordiano, who is in danger from his own mutinous Praetorian Guards. By the time the hero reaches Italy and the temporary Roman capital of Ravenna, the guards have already murdered the mild and scholarly Emperor, replacing him with their chief officer Filippo Afro. Gordiano's daughter Ulpia faces the prospect of marrying Filippo's worthless son Rezio, linking the usurper to the imperial family. Hercules undertakes to set the situation right, rescuing Ulpia and helping the great Roman general Lucio Trajano Decio seize the throne.

== Cast ==
- Alan Steel as Hercules
- Wandisa Guida as Ulpia
- Livio Lorenzon as Mansurio
- Daniele Vargas as Filippo Afro
- Dina De Santis as Arminia
- Tullio Altamura as Lucillo
- Carlo Tamberlani as Emperor Gordiano
- Andrea Aureli as Rosio
- Anna Arena as Fenicia
- Nello Pazzafini as Segesto
- Ignazio Balsamo as Tauras
- Attilio Dottesio as Satiro
- Salvatore Borghese as Mirko
- Mimmo Palmara as Lucio Traiano

== Release ==
Hercules Against Rome was released in Italy on 15 May 1964 with a 94-minute running time. On its release in the United States, it was released at an 87-minute running time.

== See also ==
- List of films featuring Hercules
