= Zorro in the Court of England =

1960 film

- Directed by: Franco Montemurro
- Produced by: Fortunato Misiano
- Cinematography: Augusto Tiezzi
- Music by: Angelo Francesco Lavagnino
- Release date: 1969
- Country: Italy
- Language: Italian

Zorro in the Court of England (Italian: Zorro alla corte d'Inghilterra) is a 1969 Italian adventure film directed by Franco Montemurro.

== Cast ==
- Spiros Focás: Pedro Suarez / Zorro
- Dada Gallotti: Rosanna Gonzales
- Franco Ressel: Lord Percy Moore
- Massimo Carocci: Pedrito
- Daniele Vargas: Sir Basil Ruthford
- Barbara Carrol: Queen Victoria
- Tullio Altamura: Manuel Garcia
- Ignazio Balsamo: Dice gambler
- Attilio Dottesio: Public prosecutor at Cortez trial
- Franco Fantasia: Captain Wells
