= I predoni del Sahara =

- Directed by: Guido Malatesta
- Written by: Ambrogio Molteni (writer), Emilio Salgari (novel)
- Music by: Angelo Francesco Lavagnino
- Release date: 1965
- Running time: 92 minutes
- Country: Italy
- Language: Italian

I predoni del Sahara (Raiders of the Sahara) is a 1965 Italian adventure film directed by Guido Malatesta.

== Cast ==
- George Mikell as Ronald Wayne
- Pamela Tudor as Dorothy Flatters
- William Stockridge as James Stanton
- John Drake as Daniel Flatters
- Farida Fahmy as Aisha
- Carlo Tamberlani as Lord Flatters
- Enzo Fiermonte
- Nello Pazzafini as Hamid
