= List of films featuring Hercules =

This is a list of films that feature the Greco-Roman divine hero Hercules, also known as Heracles. During the 1950s and 1960s, a series of films featuring Hercules were produced in Italy.

== List of films ==
=== Italian productions ===
Film	Year	Director	Actor	Notes
The Adventures of Hercules	1985	Luigi Cozzi	Lou Ferrigno	Also known as Hercules II
The Fury of Hercules	1962	Gianfranco Parolini	Brad Harris	
Hercules	1957	Pietro Francisci	Steve Reeves	
Hercules	1983	Luigi Cozzi	Lou Ferrigno	
Hercules Against Moloch	1963	Giorgio Ferroni	Gordon Scott	Also known as The Conquest of Mycenae and Hercules Attacks
Hercules Against Rome	1964	Piero Pierotti	Alan Steel	
Hercules Against the Barbarians	1964	Domenico Paolella	Mark Forest	Also known as Hercules Against the Mongols
Hercules Against the Moon Men	1964	Giacomo Gentilomo	Alan Steel	The original Italian title of Hercules Against the Moon Men was Maciste e la regina di Samar ("Maciste and the Queen of Samar"). The French title of the film was Maciste contre les hommes de pierre ("Maciste Against the Men of Stone"), but the English distributors dubbed him to be Hercules, because Maciste was not well known to American audiences.
Hercules Against the Sons of the Sun	1964	Osvaldo Civirani	Mark Forest	
Hercules Against the Tyrants of Babylon	1964	Domenico Paolella	Rock Stevens	Also known as Hercules and the Tyrants of Babylon
Hercules and the Conquest of Atlantis	1961	Vittorio Cottafavi	Reg Park	Also known as Hercules and the Captive Women, Hercules at the Conquest of Atlantis, and Hercules and the Haunted Women
Hercules and the Masked Rider	1963	Piero Pierotti	Alan Steel	originally titled Goliath and the Masked Rider
Hercules and the Princess of Troy	1965	Albert Band	Gordon Scott	Made for TV movie
Hercules and the Queen of Lydia	1959	Pietro Francisci	Steve Reeves	Also known as Hercules Unchained
Hercules and the Ten Avengers	1964	Alberto De Martino	Dan Vadis	Also known as Hercules vs. The Giant Warriors and The Triumph of Hercules
Hercules and the Treasure of the Incas	1964	Piero Pierotti	Alan Steel	Also known as Lost Treasure of the Aztecs (not a Hercules film)
Hercules at the Center of the Earth	1961	Mario Bava	Reg Park	Also known as Hercules in the Haunted World and Hercules vs. the Vampires
Hercules in the Vale of Woe	1962	Mario Mattoli	Kirk Morris	Also known as Maciste Against Hercules in the Vale of Woe
Hercules of the Desert	1963	Tanio Boccia	Kirk Morris	Also known as Desert Raiders
Hercules, Prisoner of Evil	1963	Anthony Dawson & Ruggero Deodato	Reg Park	
Hercules, Samson and Ulysses	1963	Pietro Francisci	Kirk Morris	
Hercules the Avenger	1965	Mauricio Lucidi	Reg Park	made with stock footage from earlier Hercules films
Hercules vs. Ulysses	1962	Mario Caiano	Mike Lane	Also known as Ulysses Against the Son of Hercules
Hercules, Samson, Maciste, and Ursus: the Invincibles	1964	Giorgio Capitani and others	Alan Steel	Also known as Samson and His Mighty Challenge
The Loves of Hercules	1960	Carlo Bragaglia	Mickey Hargitay	Also known as Hercules vs. the Hydras
Revenge of Hercules	1960	Vittorio Cottafavi	Mark Forest	Also known as Goliath and the Dragon (not a Hercules film)

=== American productions ===
Film	Year	Director	Actor	Notes
Hercules	1995	Toshiyuki Hiruma & Takashi Masunaga	Tony Ail (voice)	Direct-to-Video Animated production by Jetlag Productions
Hercules	1997	John Musker & Ron Clements	Tate Donovan (voice)	Theatrical Animated production by Walt Disney Pictures
Enchanted Tales: Hercules	1997	Diane Eskenazi	Cam Clarke (voice)	Direct-to-video animated production by Golden Films
Hercules	2005	Roger Young	Paul Telfer	TV film
Hercules	2014	Brett Ratner	Dwayne Johnson	Theatrical
Hercules and the Amazon Women	1994	Bill Norton	Kevin Sorbo	TV film produced by Universal Television
Hercules and the Lost Kingdom	1994	Harley Cokeliss	Kevin Sorbo	TV film produced by Universal Television
Hercules and the Circle of Fire	1994	Doug Lefler	Kevin Sorbo	TV film produced by Universal Television
Hercules in the Underworld	1994	Bill Norton	Kevin Sorbo	TV film produced by Universal Television
Hercules in the Maze of the Minotaur	1994	Josh Becker	Kevin Sorbo	TV film produced by Universal Television
Hercules and Xena – The Animated Movie: The Battle for Mount Olympus	1998	Lynne Naylor	Kevin Sorbo (voice)	Direct-to-video
Hercules in New York	1970	Arthur Seidelman	Arnold Schwarzenegger	Theatrical; also known as Hercules: The Movie and Hercules Goes Bananas
Hercules Reborn	2014	Nick Lyon	John Morrison	Direct-to-video production by The Asylum
Hercules: Zero to Hero	1999	Bob Kline,Ted Stones & Phil Weinstein	Tate Donovan (voice)	Direct-to-video animated production by Walt Disney Television Animation
Immortals	2011	Tarsem Dhandwar	Steve Byers	Theatrical
Jason and the Argonauts	1963	Don Chaffey	Nigel Green	Theatrical; also known as Jason and the Golden Fleece
Jason and the Argonauts	2000	Nick Willing	Brian Thompson	TV film; also known as Jason and the Golden Fleece
The Legend of Hercules	2014	Renny Harlin	Kellan Lutz	Theatrical; also known as Hercules: The Legend Begins
Little Hercules in 3-D	2009	Mohamed Khashoggi	Richard Sandrak	
The Three Stooges Meet Hercules	1962	Edward Bernds	Samson Burke	Theatrical
The Warrior's Husband	1933	Walter Lang	Tiny Sandford	Theatrical spoof adapted from a stage play, in which Hercules is a coward
Hercules	1983	Luigi Cozzi	Lou Ferrigno	Theatrical
The Adventures of Hercules	1985	Lugi Cozzi	Lou Ferrigno	Theatrical; also known as Hercules II
The Amazing Feats of Young Hercules	1997	Skinny Wen	?	Direct-to-video shorts
Young Hercules	1998 - 1999	TV Series	Ian Bohen	Direct-to-video prequel film to Hercules: The Legendary Journeys
Thor: Love and Thunder	2022	Taika Waititi	Brett Goldstein	Theatrical

=== Other prodictions ===
Film	Year	Country	Director	Actor	Notes
Les Douze Travaux d'Hercule	1910	France	Émile Cohl		Silent animated short film

== See also ==
- Hercules: The Animated Series, TV series based on the Disney film
- Hercules in popular culture
