= Cavalier in Devil's Castle =

1959 film

- Directed by: Mario Costa
- Written by: Sergio Corbucci; Piero Vivarelli
- Produced by: Fortunato Misiano
- Starring: Massimo Serato; Irène Tunc; Luisella Boni
- Cinematography: Augusto Tiezzi
- Edited by: Jolanda Benvenuti
- Music by: Michele Cozzoli
- Release date: 1959
- Language: Italian

Cavalier in Devil's Castle (Italian: Il cavaliere del castello maledetto), also known as The Cavaliers of Devil's Castle, is a 1959 Italian swashbuckler film written and directed by Mario Costa and starring Massimo Serato, Irène Tunc and Luisella Boni.

== Plot ==
Ugone di Collefeltro has succeeded through a stratagem to imprison his uncle, Count Oliviero, legitimate lord of the fief of Valgrande, and is now trying to obtain from him a document in which the count declares to give him his rights. But the count refuses to sign such a declaration. Then Ugone calls Countess Isabella, daughter of Oliviero, back to her castle, with the intention of marrying her, thus becoming the legitimate owner of the fief.

== Cast ==
- Massimo Serato as Captain Ugone di Collefeltro
- Irène Tunc as Marquise Fiamma
- Luisella Boni as Countess Isabella
- Pierre Cressoy as Astolfo
- Livio Lorenzon as Guidobaldo Fortebraccio
- Maria Sima as Violante
- Carlo Tamberlani as Conte Oliviero
- Aldo Bufi Landi as Duccio
- Luciano Marin as Gianetto
- Ugo Sasso
- Amedeo Trilli
- Miranda Campa
- Ignazio Balsamo
- Gina Mascetti
- Franco Fantasia
