= Hercules and the Treasure of the Incas =

1964 film

- Directed by: Piero Pierotti
- Screenplay by: Arpad DeRiso; Piero Pierotti
- Produced by: Fortunato Misiano
- Starring: Alan Steel; Tony Sailer; Wolfgang Lukschy; Mario Petri; Brigitte Heiberg
- Cinematography: Augusto Tiezzi
- Music by: Angelo Francesco Lavagnino
- Production companies: Romana Film; Ilysse Productions
- Release date: 15 October 1964
- Running time: 110 minutes (Italy); 90 minutes (U.S. Print)
- Countries: Italy; France

Hercules and the Treasure of the Incas (Italian: Sansone e il tesoro degli Incas) is a 1964 film written and directed by Piero Pierotti and starring Alan Steel. Originally conceived as a peplum film, given the contemporary success of A Fistful of Dollars, it was turned into a western film during the shootings, resulting in a bizarre crossover between the two genres. Although Alan Steel reverts to a Hercules-like character in the film's climax, the bulk of the film resembles a standard Spaghetti Western.

== Plot ==
A cowboy named William Smith (Alan Steel) tries to save his friend who has been framed for committing a murder. The two leave civilization and find themselves in mountainous territory on the trail of a hidden treasure, which is guarded by a lost Inca tribe (who are also referred to as Aztecs in the film). After the Spanish conquistadors wiped out the Aztecs in the Sixteenth Century, a small group of Aztecs managed to escape to the Arizona territory, bringing with them a vast cache of gold. They somehow built a hidden city in the desert where they lived in peace for many years until a lost map turns up and ignites a treasure hunt among two competing groups of cowboys. Mario Petri leads the bad guys who arrive at the city first before hero Alan Steel's party can get there. They enter the lost city through two golden doors built into the side of a cliff face. After the two groups try to kill each other, the Aztecs start attacking them all with arrows. When Petri finally gets possession of the treasure, he loses his mind and kills off the members of his own gang. The Aztec natives decide to sacrifice the last three surviving white men by throwing them into a river of molten gold. At the climax of the film, Alan Steel inexplicably reverts to a Hercules-like character and uses his massive strength to tear down the city just before an earthquake coincidentally destroys whatever's remaining of the place. The heroes escape in the end through the hidden city's golden doors.

== Cast ==
- Alan Steel as William Smith / Hercules
- Toni Sailer as Alan Fox
- Wolfgang Lukschy as El Puma
- Brigitte Heiberg as Jenny Nixon
- Mario Petri as Jerry Darmon, the villain
- Anna Maria Polani as Queen Mysia
- Pierre Cressoy as Vince
- Federico Boido as Tex
- Elisabetta Fanti as Urpia
- Dada Gallotti as Ilona
- Omero Gargano as Bartender
- Antonio Gradoli as Castoro
- Franco Jamonte as Darmon's Accomplice
- Gino Marturano as Barracuda
- Harry Riebauer as Sheriff
- Bruno Scipioni as Darmon Henchman
- Andrea Scotti as Stagecoach Traveller
- Attilio Severini as Grizzly
- Umberto Spadaro as Darmon Henchman
- Carlo Tamberlani as Burt Nixon
- Gilberto Galimberti as Aztec
- Amedeo Trilli as Barber
- Nino Vingelli as Indian

== Release ==
Hercules and the Treasure of the Incas was released on 15 October 1964. In Italy, the film had a 110-minute running time while in the United States it was edited to 90 minutes.

== See also ==
- List of Italian films of 1964
- List of films featuring Hercules
