= Hercules and the Masked Rider =

1963 film

- Directed by: Piero Pierotti
- Screenplay by: Luciano Martino; Piero Perotti; Ernesto Gastaldi; Arpad DeRiso
- Story by: Luciano Martino; Piero Perotti
- Produced by: Fortunato Misiano
- Starring: Alan Steel; Mimmo Palmara; Jose Greci
- Cinematography: Augusto Tiezzi
- Edited by: Jolanda Benvenuti
- Release date: 17 November 1963 (Italy)
- Running time: 85 minutes

Hercules and the Masked Rider (Italian: Golia e il cavaliere mascherato, also known as Goliath and the Masked Rider) is a 1963 Italian peplum film written and directed by Piero Pierotti and starring Alan Steel and Mimmo Palmara. A crossover film, it is set in the seventeenth century Spain and it features Hercules (Goliath in the original version) in a Zorro-like scenario.

== Cast ==
- Alan Steel as Hercules/Goliath
- Mimmo Palmara as Don Juan
- José Greci as Dona Blanca
- Pilar Cansino as Estella, the Gypsy Queen
- Arturo Dominici as Don Ramiro Suarez
- Dina De Santis as Dolores
- Piero Leri as Felipe
- Renato Navarrini as Don Francisco
- Loris Gizzi as Pedro
- Ettore Manni as Captain Blasco
- Tullio Altamura as Ruiz
- Ugo Sasso as Hermann
- Armando Guarnieri as Don Alvarez

== Release ==
Hercules and the Masked Rider was released in Italy on 17 November 1963 with an 85-minute running time. It received a release in the United States in 1964 with an 86-minute running time.

== See also ==
- List of films featuring Hercules

== Footnotes ==
=== References ===
- Kinnard, Roy; Crnkovich, Tony (2017). Italian Sword and Sandal Films, 1908-1990. McFarland. ISBN 978-1476662916.
