= Ignazio Balsamo =

Italian actor (1912–1994)

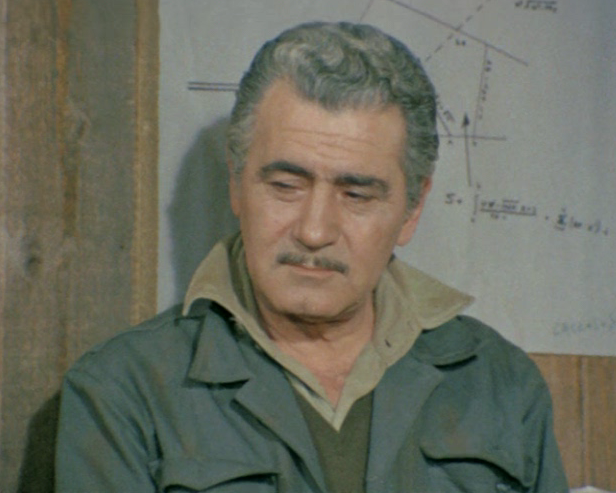
- Balsamo in Il ragazzo che sorride (1969)
- Born: 25 October 1912; Catania, Italy
- Died: 7 August 1994 (aged 81); Italy

Ignazio Balsamo (25 October 1912 – 7 August 1994) was an Italian film and stage actor.

== Life and career ==
Born in Catania, Balsamo began his career on stage, being part of several Sicilian language theatrical companies. Discovered by Pietro Germi, who offered him a role of weight in the film In the Name of the Law, following the success of the film Balsamo moved to Rome where he had a long film career as a character actor, mainly cast in roles of Sicilian criminals and villains. He also worked as a production coordinator and a production runner for the companies Fortunia Film and Romana Film. Balsamo was also author of two plays in Sicilian language, Casa Cantoniera and Tila di ragnu.

== Selected filmography ==
- In the Name of the Law (1949) - Francesco Messana
- Outlaw Girl (1950) - Ciro Sollima
- The Fighting Men (1950) - Antonio Schepisi
- Il caimano del Piave (1951) - Sergente siciliano al fronte
- Behind Closed Shutters (1951) - Minor Role (uncredited)
- Tragic Serenade (1951)
- La vendetta di una pazza (1951)
- Anna (1951) - Un agente di pubblica sicurezza (uncredited)
- What Price Innocence? (1952) - Giovanni
- Ergastolo (1952)
- Girls Marked Danger (1952) - Il Francese
- I tre corsari (1952) - Van Stiller
- Jolanda, the Daughter of the Black Corsair (1952) - Van Stiller
- La carovana del peccato (1953)
- Addio, figlio mio! (1953) - Martinelli
- Neapolitan Turk (1953) - Luigi
- La lupa (1953) - Don Antonio, Imbornone's Secretary
- The Ship of Condemned Women (1953) - Duràn
- Genoese Dragnet (1954) - Giovanni Feruglio
- Letter from Naples (1954) - The Police Commissioner
- Cuore di mamma (1954) - Biagio Carrino
- Acque amare (1954) - Police Commissioner
- It Happened at the Police Station (1954) - Taxi driver
- La Luciana (1954)
- Buonanotte... avvocato! (1955) - Commissar
- The White Angel (1955) - Un poliziotto
- Suonno d'ammore (1955) - Arturo, Padre di Maria
- La rossa (1955) - Un brigadiere dei carabinieri
- Accadde al penitenziario (1955) - Detenuto mafioso
- La moglie è uguale per tutti (1955) - The Sicilian Passenger on Bus
- Una sera di maggio (1955)
- Andalusia Express (1956) - Rubio
- Arrivano i dollari! (1957) - Ernesto
- Cavalier in Devil's Castle (1959)
- Policarpo (1959) - Poliziotto (uncredited)
- The Magistrate (1959) - The Sea Captain
- The Pirate and the Slave Girl (1959)
- The Giant of Marathon (1959) - Ship's Captain
- Ferdinando I re di Napoli (1959) - The Jailer
- I baccanali di Tiberio (1960)
- La Dolce Vita (1960) - (uncredited)
- Un militare e mezzo (1960) - Porter
- Knight of 100 Faces (1960) - Aiutante di Fosco
- Le bal des espions (1960)
- Pirates of the Coast (1960) - Brook
- Rapina al quartiere Ovest (1960)
- Robin Hood e i pirati (1960)
- Un dollaro di fifa (1960) - Poker Player
- Garibaldi (1961) - Colonel Pallavicino
- L'onorata società (1961)
- The Secret of the Black Falcon (1961) - Sancho
- Don Camillo: Monsignor (1961) - Un compagno socialista (uncredited)
- Queen of the Seas (1961) - Captain of the Guard
- The Vengeance of Ursus (1961) - Andros
- The Italian Brigands (1961) - Scannamorti
- Duello nella sila (1962)
- Odio mortale (1962) - Herrera
- Gli eroi del doppio gioco (1962) - Partisan
- Zorro and the Three Musketeers (1963)
- The Eye of the Needle (1962) - Father of Nicola
- L'invincibile cavaliere mascherato (1963) - Primo Cittadino appestato
- Samson and the Slave Queen (1963) - Joaquim
- Hercules and the Masked Rider (1963)
- Una spada nell'ombra (1963) - Zingano
- Hercules and the Black Pirates (1964)
- Hercules Against Rome (1964) - Tauras
- Terror in the Crypt (1964) - (uncredited)
- Hercules and the Treasure of the Incas (1964) - Sergeant (uncredited)
- Goliath at the Conquest of Damascus (1965) - Messenger
- Giant of the Evil Island (1965) - Navarro
- How We Robbed the Bank of Italy (1966) - Fake Nurse
- Zorro il ribelle (1966) - Salvador
- Shoot Loud, Louder... I Don't Understand (1966)
- La notte dell'addio (1966)
- 7 monaci d'oro (1966) - Brigadiere (uncredited)
- Danger!! Death Ray (1967) - Henchman 'X2' (uncredited)
- The Magnificent Texan (1967) - Stark Henchman (uncredited)
- 2 RRRingos no Texas (1967) - Poker player
- Non mi dire mai good-bye (1967)
- Delitto a Posillipo - Londra chiama Napoli (1967) - Rosario (uncredited)
- Due occhi per uccidere (1968)
- I 2 pompieri (1968)
- I 2 deputati (1968) - PCI member
- Zorro in the Court of England (1969) - Dice gambler
- Il ragazzo che sorride (1969) - Assistant of engineer
- Indovina chi viene a merenda? (1969) - Cook (uncredited)
- Zorro, the Navarra Marquis (1969) - Apothecary
- I 2 magnifici fresconi (1969) - don Mimì Cannaruta
- Franco, Ciccio e il pirata Barbanera (1969)
- Poppea's Hot Nights (1969)
- Satiricosissimo (1970) - Pedlar (uncredited)
- Ma chi t'ha dato la patente? (1970)
- W le donne (1970) - Marshal Palombi
- Principe coronato cercasi per ricca ereditiera (1970) - Creditor (uncredited)
- Mezzanotte d'amore (1970) - Prison Guard
- I due maggiolini più matti del mondo (1970)
- Due bianchi nell'Africa nera (1970)
- I due maghi del pallone (1970) - Manager of Ghiandineddese
- Zorro il cavaliere della vendetta (1971) - (final film role)
