= Rimorso =

- Directed by: Armando Grottini
- Cinematography: Giuseppe La Torre
- Music by: Giuseppe Cioffi
- Release date: 1952
- Country: Italy
- Language: Italian

Rimorso is a 1952 Italian melodrama film.

== Cast ==
- Maria Grazia Francia as Maria
- Otello Toso as Corrado Anselmi
- Linda Sini as Tamara
- Mirko Ellis as Luciano
- Agostino Salvietti as Raffaele
- Tina Pica as Assunta
- Enzo Maggio as Gennaro
- Ignazio Balsamo as Police Commissioner
