= Bullets Don't Argue =

1964 film

- Directed by: Mario Caiano
- Screenplay by: Franco Castellano; Pipolo
- Story by: Franco Castellano; Pipolo
- Starring: Rod Cameron; Angel Aranda; Horst Frank; Mimmo Palmara
- Cinematography: Julio Ortas; Massimo Dallamano
- Edited by: Roberto Cinquini
- Music by: Ennio Morricone
- Production companies: Jolly Film; Constantin Film; Trio Films
- Release date: 23 October 1964
- Running time: 93 minutes
- Countries: West Germany; Spain; Italy
- Language: Italian

Bullets Don't Argue (Italian title: Le pistole non discutono, also known as Guns Don't Talk and Pistols Don't Argue) is a 1964 Italian Spaghetti Western directed by Mario Caiano. The film was produced by Jolly Film, back to back with Sergio Leone's A Fistful of Dollars, but with a more extensive budget and anticipating greater success than Leone's film, especially since at the time leading actor Rod Cameron was better known than Clint Eastwood.

== Plot ==
On his wedding day, sheriff Pat Garrett must arrest two bank robbers.

== Cast ==
- Rod Cameron as Pat Garrett
- Horst Frank as Billy Clayton
- Angel Aranda as George Clayton
- Vivi Bach as Agnes Goddard
- Hans Nielsen as Reverend Alvarez
- Luis Durán as Mike Goddard
- Kai Fischer as Helen
- Dick Palmer as Santero
- Andrea Aureli as Manuel
- José Manuel Martín as Ramon
- Tito García as Miguel
- Eulalia Tenorio
- Giulia Rubini as Martha Coogan
- Joe Kamel as Capt. MacKay
- Manuel Arbó as Banquero
- Simón Arriaga as Santero Henchman
- Juan Cortés as Banker
- Gonzalo de Esquiroz as Comisario
- Guillermo Méndez
- Julio Pérez Tabernero as Comisario
- Rafael Vaquero as Comisario

== Release ==
Bullets Don't Argue was released on 23 October 1964.
