= Panhandle 38 =

1972 film

- Directed by: Toni Secchi
- Written by: Mario Amendola; Toni Secchi; Luisa Montagnana; Massimo Franciosa
- Cinematography: Giorgio Regis
- Music by: Franco Micalizzi
- Release date: 1972
- Country: Italy
- Language: Italian

Panhandle 38 (Italian: ...e alla fine lo chiamarono Jerusalem l'implacabile, also known as Padella calibro 38 and Panhandle Calibre 38) is a 1972 Italian comedy-western film. The film represents the debut and the only film directed by Toni Secchi, that had previously been the cinematographer of a number of successful spaghetti westerns. It was also the only leading role for Scott Holden, the son of William Holden and Brenda Marshall, who had a brief film career in early 70s.

== Cast ==
- Scott Holden: Jessie Bronson / Jerusalem
- Keenan Wynn: Billy Bronson / Kile Richards
- Delia Boccardo: Connie Briscott
- Philippe Leroy: General Briscott
- Franco Fabrizi: Fernand
- Mimmo Palmara: Sheriff
- Remo Capitani: El Tornado (credited as Ray O'Connor)
- Giorgio Trestini: Bobo Bison
- Nello Pazzafini: Bullseye Joe
- Giorgio White: Chief Black Eagle
