= 3 Avengers =

1964 film

- Directed by: Gianfranco Parolini
- Written by: Lionello De Felice; Arnaldo Marrosu; Gianfranco Parolini
- Starring: Alan Steel
- Cinematography: Francesco Izzarelli
- Edited by: Edmondo Lozzi
- Music by: Angelo Francesco Lavagnino
- Release date: 1964
- Country: Italy
- Language: Italian

3 Avengers (Italian: Gli invincibili tre, also spelled as The 3 Avengers and The Three Avengers) is a 1964 Italian peplum film written and directed by Gianfranco Parolini and starring Alan Steel.

== Cast ==
- Alan Steel as Ursus
- Mimmo Palmara as The False Ursus
- Lisa Gastoni as Alina
- Rosalba Neri as Demora
- Carlo Tamberlani as King Igos
- Gianni Rizzo as Teomocus
- Vassili Karis as Prince Darius
- Vincenzo Maggio as Manina
- Nello Pazzafini as Samur
- Orchidea De Santis as Blonde Girl
- Arnaldo Dell'Acqua as Pico
- Enzo Maggio as Manina
- Enzo Doria as Aleco
