= Mimmo Palmara =

Italian actor

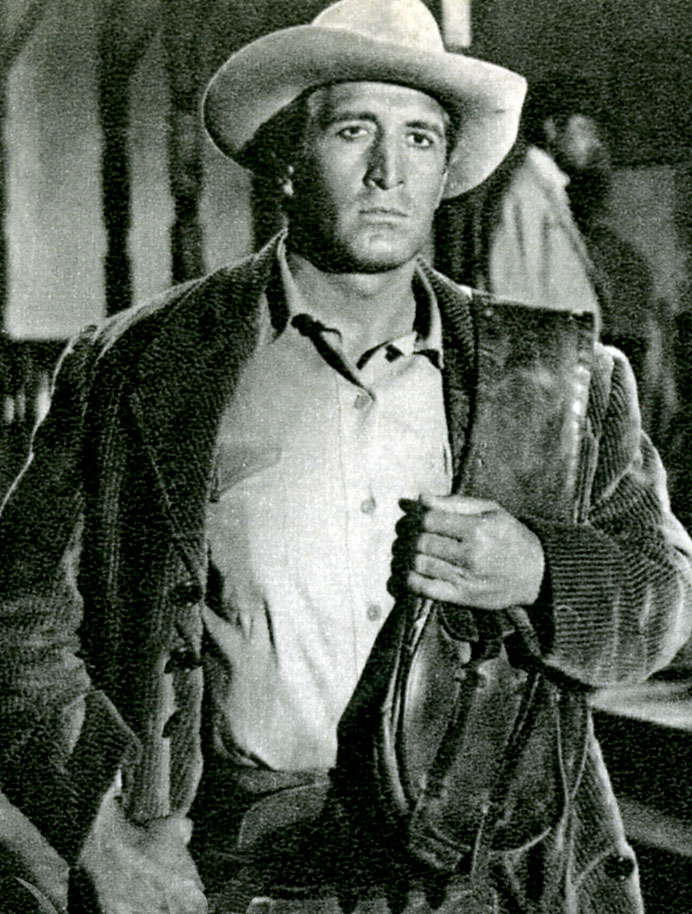
- Palmara in For One Thousand Dollars Per Day (1966)
- Born: Domenico Palmara; 25 July 1928; Cagliari, Sardinia, Italy
- Died: 10 June 2016 (aged 87); Rome, Italy
- Occupation: Actor
- Years active: 1952–1996

Domenico "Mimmo" Palmara (25 July 1928 – 10 June 2016) was an Italian actor.

== Biography ==
Born in Cagliari, Palmara made his film debut in 1952 as a character actor in drama films by eminent directors such as Luchino Visconti, Mario Monicelli and Antonio Pietrangeli, then obtained main roles in a great number of genre films, especially adventure films and peplum films. When the sword and sandals genre declined, he took part at a number of Spaghetti Westerns in which he is usually credited as Dick Palmer. A close friend of Sergio Leone, he was Leone's first choice for the role of Ramon in A Fistful of Dollars; Palmara eventually chose to star in Mario Caiano's Bullets Don't Argue and the role of Ramon was played by Gian Maria Volonté.

== Selected filmography ==
- Deceit (1952) - Un uomo in canottiera
- The Queen of Sheba (1952) - Ally of Sheba
- Sins of Rome (1953) - Gladiator (uncredited)
- Empty Eyes (1953) - Marcella's Fiancé (uncredited)
- Senso (1954) - Un soldato (uncredited)
- Attila (1954) - Lottatore
- The River Girl (1954)
- Proibito (1954)
- War and Peace (1956) - French Officer (uncredited)
- Roland the Mighty (1956) - Argalia
- Terrore sulla città (1957)
- White Nights (1957) - L'uomo che gioca a carte con la prostituta (uncredited)
- Serenata a Maria (1957) - Beppe Franchini, the truckdriver
- Marisa la civetta (1957) - Sailor (uncredited)
- Hercules (1958) - Iphitus, Son of Pelias
- Hercules Unchained (1959) - Polinices
- Sheba and the Gladiator (1959) - Lator
- Caterina Sforza, la leonessa di Romagna (1959)
- The Last Days of Pompeii (1959) - Gallinus, a Praetorian Guard
- Gastone (1960) - Manager
- Goliath Against the Giants (1961) - (uncredited)
- The Colossus of Rhodes (1961) - Ares
- Hercules and the Conquest of Atlantis (1961) - Astor, il Gran Visir
- The Trojan Horse (1961) - Ajax
- Tharus Son of Attila (1962) - Gudrum
- Appuntamento in riviera (1962) - De Marchi
- Sodom and Gomorrah (1962) - Arno
- Slave Girls of Sheba (1963) - Hibrahim / Jaspar
- Goliath and the Sins of Babylon (1963) - Alceas
- Goliath and the Rebel Slave (1963) - Artafernes
- Hercules and the Masked Rider (1963) - Don Juan
- The Ten Gladiators (1963) - Tigelinus
- Sandokan the Great (1963)
- Temple of the White Elephant (1964) - Parvati Sandok
- Hercules Against Rome (1964) - Lucio Traiano
- The Two Gladiators (1964) - Commodo
- Pirates of Malaysia (1964) - Tremal-Naïk
- Bullets Don't Argue (1964) - Santero
- 3 Avengers (1964) - False Ursus
- Three Swords for Rome (1964) - Maximo
- Kindar the Invulnerable (1965) - Seymuth
- Serenade for Two Spies (1965) - Cormoran
- For One Thousand Dollars Per Day (1966) - Steve Benson
- Two Sons of Ringo (1966) - Sceriffo
- Argoman the Fantastic Superman (1967) - Kurt, Main Henchman of Jenabel
- Poker with Pistols (1967) - Master
- Left Handed Johnny West (1967) - Jonny West
- The Handsome, the Ugly, and the Stupid (1967) - Il bello
- The Stranger (1967) - Masson
- Vengeance Is My Forgiveness (1968) - Jack Owen
- Una forca per un bastardo (1968) - Sheriff Allan Phillip
- A Long Ride from Hell (1968) - Sheriff Max Freeman
- Psychopath (1968) - Maurice
- L'Odissea (1968, TV Mini-Series) - Achille
- Execution (1968) - Clips
- Trusting Is Good... Shooting Is Better (1968) - Frank Richards
- The Son of Black Eagle (1968) - Alexej Andrejevich
- Black Jack (1968) - Indian Joe
- Time and Place for Killing (1968) - Manuel Trianas
- Indovina chi viene a merenda? (1969) - Comandante Tiger
- Ms. Stiletto (1969) - Baron Eric von Nutter
- Franco, Ciccio e il pirata Barbanera (1969) - Il Pirata Flint
- Rangers: attacco ora X (1970) - Captain Cabot
- Le Voyou (1970)
- The Tigers of Mompracem (1970) - Man Saved from Crocodiles
- The Deserter (1971) - Apache Chief Mangus Durango
- Una pistola per cento croci (1971) - Luis / Louis / Frank Damon
- He Was Called Holy Ghost (1971) - Indian Sheriff
- Panhandle 38 (1972) - Sheriff Jones
- The Arena (1974) - Rufinius
- Catene (1974) - Giovanni
- Violent City (1975) - De Julis
- That Malicious Age (1975) - Waterloo
- Natale in casa d'appuntamento (1976) - Alberto
- Convoy Busters (1978) - Corchi
- Sicilian Connection (1987) - Dr. De Majo
- 28° minuto (1991) - Police commissioner
- A Cold, Cold Winter (1996) - Leo (final film role)
