= Napoli piange e ride =

- Directed by: Flavio Calzavara
- Written by: Mario Volpe; Flavio Calzavara; Francesco Vigo; Guglielmo Santangelo; Ilia Avella; Jacopo Corsi
- Starring: Luciano Tajoli
- Cinematography: Renzo Manuelli; Mario Albertelli
- Music by: Luciano Maraviglia
- Release date: 1954
- Language: Italian

Napoli piange e ride (i. e. "Naples cries and laughs") is a 1954 Italian musical melodrama film written and directed by Flavio Calzavara and starring Luciano Tajoli and Jula De Palma .

== Plot ==
Luciano had to give up singing and his theatrical career following an accident, which made him paralyzed: he is a watchmaker. When the master Blasi, a well-known Don Giovanni, discovers that Marisa, Luciano's wife, has a beautiful voice and gets her a profitable contract, the watchmaker, suspecting an affair, is saddened by it. Blasi proposes to Marisa that she run away with him and when she refuses, he enters Marisa's house at night and tries to use violence on her. The woman reacts and in the fight Blasi is mortally wounded by a shot from his own gun. Piero, the fiancé of Luciano's sister, rushes in and in a fit of generosity, to save Marisa, pleads guilty to the killing. Luciano, as he hurries home, falls from his wheelchair and suffers a serious trauma and is at risk of becoming blind. In order to bear the cost of a difficult operation, Marisa decides to keep the contract she had canceled. The operation succeeds. The police discover Piero's innocence, confirmed by Marisa, who until now had been silent so as not to grieve Luciano. Marisa, although cleared of all charges, feels unworthy to return to her husband, but after some time, Luciano is reunited with his wife.

== Cast ==
- Luciano Tajoli as Luciano Celli
- Jula De Palma as Marisa Celli
- Janet Vidor as Marcella Celli
- Dante Maggio as Ciccillo
- Vittorio Sanipoli as Michele Blasi
- Vincenzo Musolino as Pietro
- Edoardo Toniolo as Commendator Alberti
- Nino Milano as Gaetano
- Maresa Horn as Liliana
- Anna Pretolani as Carmela
- Enzo Maggio as The Accordionist
- Carlo Marrazzini as Gaetano
- Renato Navarrini as The Doctor
