= Luisella Boni =

Italian actress (born 1935)

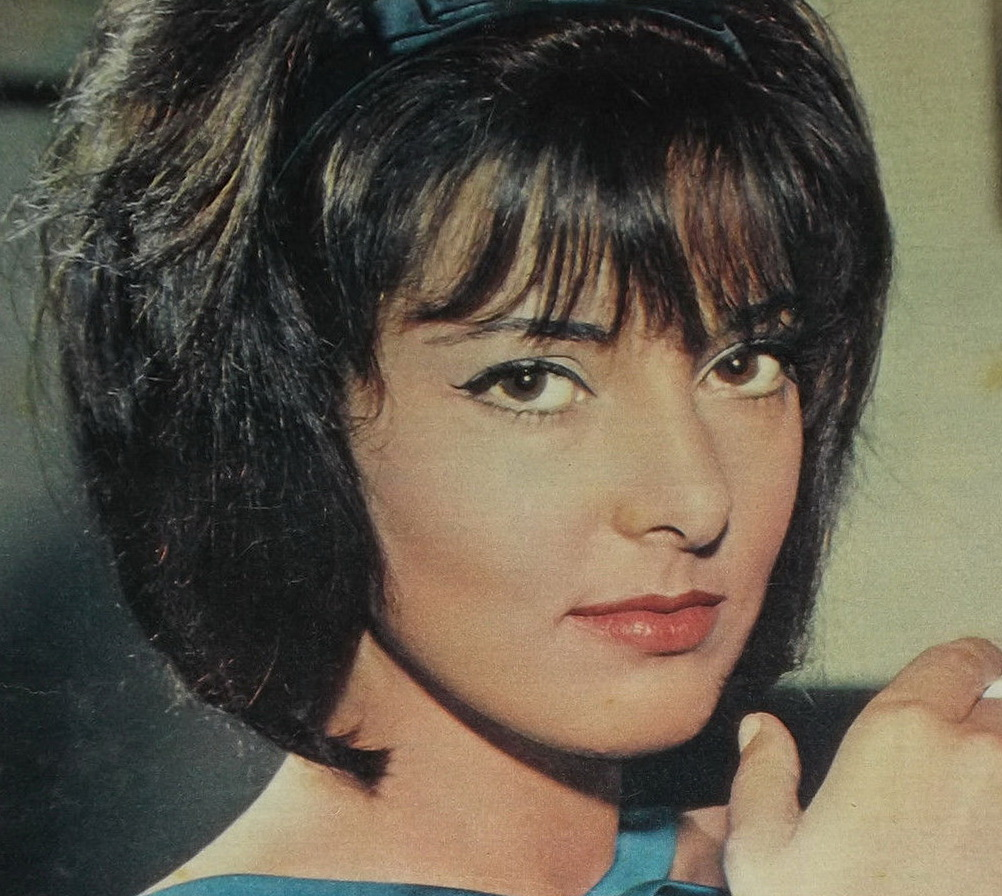
- Born: Luisa Angela Bozzo; 24 July 1935 (age 90); Como, Kingdom of Italy
- Other name: Brigitte Corey
- Occupation: Actress
- Years active: 1953–2013
- Spouse: Daniele D'Anza (1965–1984) (his death)

Luisella Boni (born 24 July 1935) is an Italian actress.

Born as Luisa Angela Bozzo, Boni debuted in 1952 in Bernard Vorhaus' film Finishing School. One of the most active actresses in Italian cinema between the early fifties and mid-sixies, she slowed her activity after her marriage to television director Daniele D'Anza in 1965. In the 1960s she was sometimes credited as Brigitte Corey.

She was also active on television and on stage.

== Selected filmography ==
- Finishing School (1953)
- Cavalcade of Song (1953)
- Frine, Courtesan of Orient (1953) - Touni
- The Treasure of Bengal (1953) - Karma
- Love in the City (1953)
- A Slice of Life (1954) - (segment "Scena all'aperto")
- Papà Pacifico (1954) - Maria Grazia - Luisa's friend
- Orphan of the Ghetto (1954) - Viola
- Eighteen Year Olds (1955) - Luisa
- Land of the Pharaohs (1955) - Kyra
- Nana (1955) - Estelle
- Il piccolo vetraio (1955) - Gisella
- La trovatella di Milano (1956) - Maria
- Whom God Forgives (1957) - María
- Le belle dell'aria (1957)
- The Angel of the Alps (1957) - Rina
- Un amore senza fine (1958)
- Tabarin (1958) - Simone
- Sergente d'ispezione (1958) - Viviani
- Cavalier in Devil's Castle (1959) - Contessa Isabella
- I mafiosi (1959) - Caterina
- Attack of the Moors (1959) - Annette
- Avventura in città (1959) - Wanda
- Il conquistatore di Maracaibo (1961) - Altagracia
- Gefährliche Reise (1961)
- Samson (1961) - Janine
- Fra Manisco cerca guai... (1961) - Maria
- The Invincible Gladiator (1961)
- The Fury Of Hercules (1962) - Daria
- Sfida nella città dell'oro (1962) - Sabina Brand
- Between Shanghai and St. Pauli (1962) - Diana
- The Old Testament (1962) - (scenes deleted)
- The Shortest Day (1963) - Una crocerossina (uncredited)
- Lontano da dove (1983) - Eleonora Serpieri Altobilli
- Un'età da sballo (1983)
- Caterina in the Big City (2003) - Andreina, madre di Gianfilippo
- Studio illegale (2013) - Moglie Carugato
