= The Son of Black Eagle =

- Directed by: Guido Malatesta
- Written by: Umberto Lenzi; Piero Pierotti; Gianfranco Clerici; Guido Malatesta
- Produced by: Fortunato Misiano
- Starring: Mimmo Palmara; Edwige Fenech; Franco Ressel
- Cinematography: Augusto Tiezzi
- Edited by: Jolanda Benvenuti
- Music by: Angelo Francesco Lavagnino
- Production company: Romana Film
- Distributed by: Romana Film
- Release date: 23 August 1968
- Running time: 91 minutes
- Country: Italy
- Language: Italian

The Son of Black Eagle (Italian: Il figlio di Aquila Nera) is a 1968 Italian historical adventure film directed by Guido Malatesta and starring Mimmo Palmara, Edwige Fenech and Franco Ressel. It was inspired by the historic success of Riccardo Freda's Black Eagle and Revenge of Black Eagle.

== Cast ==
- Mimmo Palmara as Alexej Andrejevich
- Edwige Fenech as Nastacia
- Franco Ressel as General Volkonsky
- Ingrid Schoeller as Désirée
- Andrea Aureli as Kurban
- Ivy Holzer as Tamara
- Loris Gizzi as Procopovic
- Massimo Carocci as Magg. Benekin
- Franco Pasquetto
- Tullio Altamura
- Luciano Catenacci
- Ugo Adinolfi
- Silvana Venturelli
- Gualtiero Isnenghi
- Pietro Tordi
- Rosanna Chiocchia

== Bibliography ==
- Roberto Curti. Riccardo Freda: The Life and Works of a Born Filmmaker. McFarland, 2017.
