= The Last Days of Pompeii (1959 film) =

- Theatrical release poster
- Directed by: Mario Bonnard; Sergio Leone (uncredited)
- Screenplay by: Sergio Corbucci; Ennio De Concini; Luigi Emmanuele; Sergio Leone; Duccio Tessari
- Based on: The Last Days of Pompeii; 1834 novel by Edward Bulwer-Lytton
- Produced by: Paolo Moffa
- Starring: Steve Reeves; Christine Kaufmann; Fernando Rey; Barbara Carroll
- Cinematography: Antonio L. Ballesteros
- Edited by: Eraldo Da Roma; Julio Pena
- Music by: Angelo Francesco Lavagnino
- Production companies: Procusa; Cineproduzioni Associate; Transocean-Film Vasgen Badal & Co. KG; ABC Filmverleih
- Distributed by: United Artists
- Release dates: 12 November 1959 (Italy); 22 December 1959 (West Germany)
- Running time: 100 minutes (Italy)
- Countries: Italy; Spain; West Germany
- Language: Italian

The Last Days of Pompeii (Italian: Gli ultimi giorni di Pompei) is a 1959 Eastmancolor historical disaster action film starring Steve Reeves, Christine Kaufmann, and Fernando Rey and directed by Mario Bonnard and Sergio Leone. Bonnard, the original director, fell ill on the first day of shooting, so Leone and the scriptwriters finished the film.

The film is characterized by its CinemaScope framing and lavish look, and is one of many films produced during the 1950s and 1960s as part of the peplum sword and sandal cycle, originally launched by Pietro Francisci's film Le fatiche di Ercole (1958), released as Hercules in the United States.

== Plot ==
Glaucus, a centurion returning to his home in Pompeii after a spell in Roman Palestine, sees Ione, the daughter of the city's Consul, lose control of her chariot. He saves Ione's life and then continues his journey. En route, Glaucus intervenes in defense of Antonius, a thief who is being severely punished on orders given by the Praetorian Guard Gallinus.

Glaucus later discovers that his father's house has been looted and his father was murdered by a band of hooded thieves who have been terrorizing Pompeii, always leaving a cross painted on a wall as a calling card. Glaucus vows revenge against the killers.

In order to convince the Emperor that the mass murders are not a sign of trouble, Ascanius, the Consul of Pompeii, orders a citywide festival. In the streets, Antonius rolls a drunken soldier and steals his money bag. It contains a ring that belonged to Glaucus's father and a black hood identical to that worn by the killers. Antonius brings the ring to Glaucus' friend Marcus, who follows the soldier to Pompeii's Temple of Isis. But before Marcus can tell anybody what he has discovered, he is killed by Arbaces, the High Priest of Isis, and his body is left to be found with a Christian cross carved into it.

During the festival, Glaucus takes out his anger by getting drunk and crashes a party at Ascanius's house. There, Gallinus tries to rape Nydia, Ione's blind slave, much to the amusement of the crowd. Glaucus defends Nydia, defeating Gallinus in a fight. The next day Marcus's funeral is held, with Glaucus and Antonius in attendance. After the ceremony, Antonius reaffirms his anti-Christian prejudices. But Nydia is a Christian, and thinking she is addressing Antonius, says he should attend a secret Christian gathering to change his mind and tells him how to find it. However, it is Gallinus who hears her plea. Gallinus is in charge of persecuting Christians and, with this piece of information, that night rounds up and imprisons all of them. They are tortured and condemned to death, accused of the crime wave that has affected Pompeii.

Meanwhile, Glaucus and Ione have fallen in love. Convinced that the Christians have been falsely accused, he heads to Herculanum to intervene in their favor with Ione's father, who has left Pompeii. On his way, Glaucus is ambushed by the hooded men. He survives the attack, arriving injured at Ascanius's retreat. Meanwhile, Antonius follows Marcus's killer to the temple of Isis, discovering that the hooded men work under Arbaces's orders. Antonius proceeds to Herculanum and informs Glaucus and Ascanius of his discovery; as proof, he tells them that the treasures stolen from the citizens of Pompeii are hidden in the temple. Back in Pompeii, Antonius recruits the help of Helios and Caios, Glaucus's army friends.

At the temple of Isis, Glaucus fights off Arbaces and Gallinus but is thrown into a secret ditch and finds himself in a waterlogged chamber wrestling with a crocodile. He wins the fight and escapes the trap. Julia, the Consul's Egyptian mistress, is in fact the mastermind behind the crimes of the black-hooded men and the dirty dealing of Gallinus and Ascanius. They are raising funds to finance an uprising against the Roman Empire. She confesses this to Ascanius and stabs him, blaming Glaucus for the killing. Accused of murder, Glaucus is imprisoned near the Christians. Ione tries to come to his defense, but since she has converted to Christianity, she is also sent to prison.

The Christians are tossed into the arena to be devoured by a lion, but Glaucus frees himself, slays the lion and defeats gladiators sent to kill him. Bow-men, who are actually Antonius and Glaucus' masked friends, arrive and open fire on the royal box, killing Gallinus. As the troops arrive to stop them, Mount Vesuvius erupts. In the chaos, everyone tries to escape. Julia and Arbaces are crushed at the temple by Isis' toppling idol while trying to retrieve their treasure. Nydia is mortally wounded by falling debris, and Antonius remains by her side as the city is buried in ashes. Glaucus swims through a burning harbor. With Ione, he survives Pompeii's destruction, sailing toward open sea.

== Cast ==
- Steve Reeves as Glaucus
- Christine Kaufmann as Ione
- Fernando Rey as Arbaces, high priest
- Barbara Carroll as Nydia
- Anne-Marie Baumann as Julia
- Angel Aranda as Antonius
- Mimmo Palmara as Gallinus
- Guillermo Marín as Ascanius, Consul of Pompeii
- Carlo Tamberlani as Leader of the Christians
- Mino Doro as Second Consul
- Mario Berriatúa as Marcus
- Mario Morales as Caius
- Ángel Ortiz as Helios
- Lola Torres as hotel keeper

== Production ==
=== Background ===
The 1959 film The Last Days of Pompeii was the eighth cinematic version of Edward Bulwer-Lytton's novel of the same name. First published in 1834, the novel became a bestseller, helped on its release by the eruption of Vesuvius just before publication. The novel was a fictional account of the events surrounding the eruption of Vesuvius that buried the Roman city of Pompeii in AD 79. It was an example of a widespread English fascination in the 1830s with great natural catastrophes and the moral lessons to be learned from them.

There have been many film adaptations of the Pompeii legend, but most of them have not followed Edward Bulwer-Lytton's novel. The story of Pompeii's destruction was one of the most popular topics of early Italian cinema and was filmed several times during the silent movie era. It has been filmed twice as a Hollywood epic. The first was produced in 1935 by Merian C. Cooper. In 2007 Roman Polanski was attached to a film adaptation based on a Robert Harris novel set in the city, but that project was ultimately brought to fruition by Paul W. S. Anderson in 2014. The 1984 television film is the only version so far to have closely followed the original Bulwer-Lytton novel.

The film versions before 1959 had centered on the eruption of Vesuvius, the Christians, the lions in the arena and the villainous high priest, leaving the rest of the plot. The idea to make a new film on the same subject, taking advantage of Eastmancolor and a Supertotalscope widescreen, came from producer and director Paolo Moffa. Moffa had produced and co directed with Marcel L'Herbier a film version of The Last Days of Pompeii ten years earlier.

=== Writing ===
The film was very loosely based on the novel, bearing only a passing resemblance to the English author's The Last Days of Pompeii. Many of the main characters are present and named—notably Glaucus, Arbacès, Ione and Nydia—but the storylines about them are largely changed and many elements are left out. The team of five credited writers, including Sergio Corbucci, Ennio De Concini, Sergio Leone, and genre regular Duccio Tessari, instead weave a new story around persecuted Christians. There is no historical evidence of the existence of a Christian community in Pompeii, but this has appeared on the source novel. The religious aspect of the story was a result of the film's having been underwritten by Opus Dei.

=== Casting ===
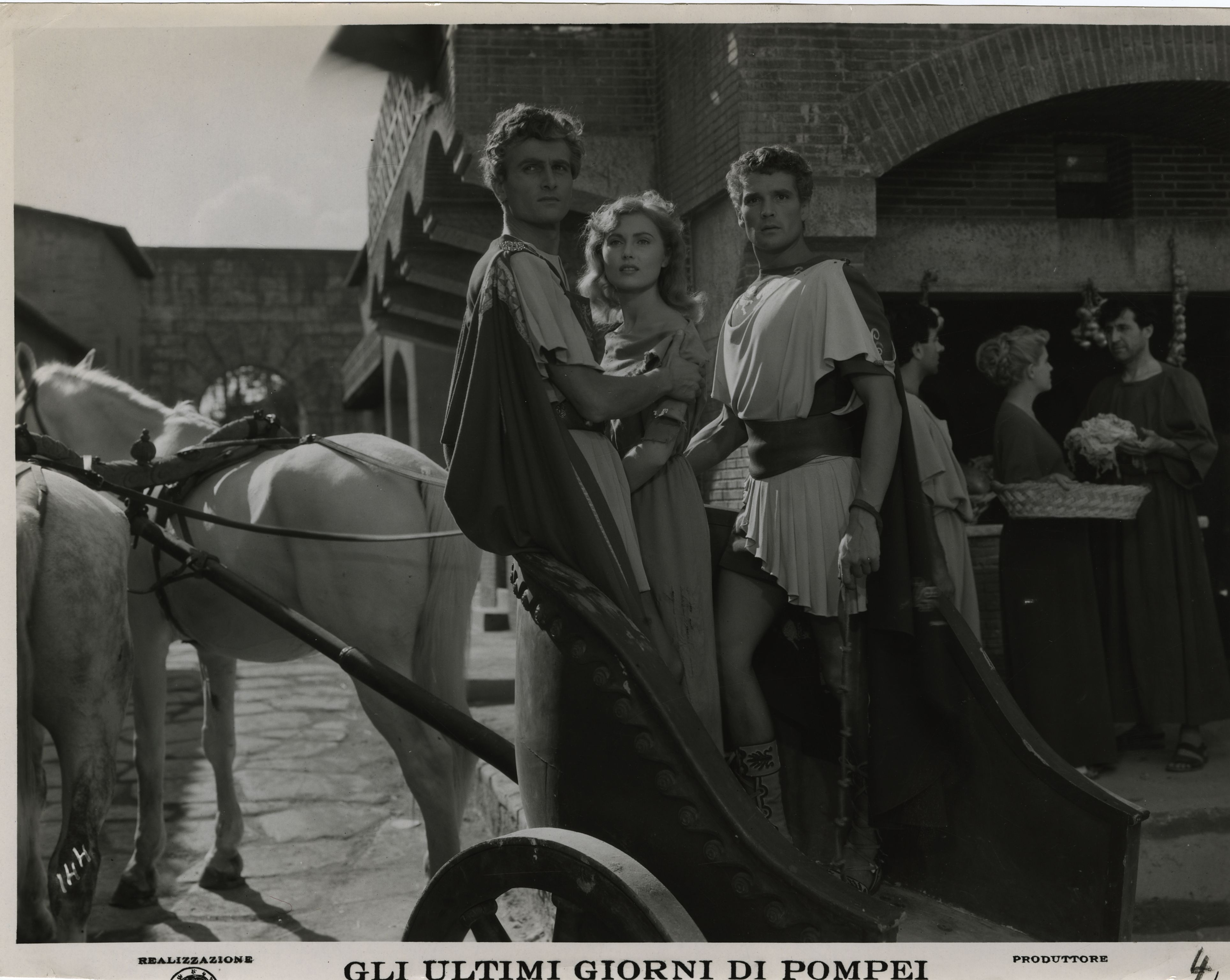
A scene from The Last Days of Pompeii

Two weeks before shooting began, Steve Reeves was cast in the main role of Glaucus, a Roman centurion. The Last Days of Pompeii was his first film since gaining international fame playing the character Hercules in Hercules (1958) and Hercules Unchained (1959). After he was cast, the plot of the film was modified to take advantage of Reeve's physique adding more spectacular scenes: an underwater fight with a crocodile; a sequence where the column of a temple is lifted and the confrontation with the lions. Reeves, cleanly shaven this time around, injured his shoulder while filming an early scene when he saves Ione from driving her chariot into a wall, the wound was further complicated during the swimming scene fight with the crocodile. This injury effectively put an end to his bodybuilding career, as well as ultimately forcing his early retirement from the movie business a few years later after A Long Ride from Hell. The injury presented a balance problem for Reeves, and stunt doubles were used for his scenes on horseback.

The female lead is played by Christine Kaufmann, who was only 14 years old at that time. The respected Spanish character actor Fernando Rey appears as the villainous high priest. Barbara Caroll, of 1961's Goliath contro i giganti plays the blind slave Nydia, and fans of Goliath contro i giganti should also recognize Spanish actor Ángel Aranda as the young Antonius. Mimmo Palmara was already a genre regular, having appeared in both Hercules films with Reeves. He has the role of the Praetorian guard Gallinus. Anne-Marie Baumann, who only had a brief career in films, plays Julia, the Consul's Egyptian concubine. Each of the contributing production companies insisted on a name above the title to represent and protect its investment.

== Filming ==
Director Mario Bonnard fell ill during production, leaving most of the film to be shot by Sergio Leone who went uncredited in the film prints.

== Release ==
The film was released in Italy on 12 November 1959. It was released in Germany on 22 December 1959.

United Artists distributed the film in 13 countries worldwide, including the U.S., Australia, Canada, Great Britain, Denmark, Iceland, India, Japan, New Zealand, Norway, Pakistan, South Africa and Sweden. They released it in the U.S. on July 17, 1960.

Kine Weekly called it a "money maker" at the British box office in 1960.

== Bibliography ==
- Frayling, Christopher. Something to Do With Death. Faber & Faber, 2000. ISBN 0571164382
- Kinnard, Roy; Crnkovich, Tony (2017). Italian Sword and Sandal Films, 1908-1990. McFarland. ISBN 9781476662916.
