= Samson (1961 Italian film) =

- Directed by: Gianfranco Parolini
- Written by: Oscar D'Amico; Gianfranco Parolini; Giovanni Simonelli
- Starring: Brad Harris; Alan Steel
- Cinematography: Francesco Izzarelli
- Music by: Carlo Innocenzi
- Release date: 1961
- Running time: 99 minutes
- Language: Italian

Samson (Italian: Sansone) is a 1961 Italian-French co-produced peplum film shot in Yugoslavia. It was co-written and directed by Gianfranco Parolini in his first film with Brad Harris who plays the title role.

It is the film which introduced the character of Samson, cleared of his Biblical traits, into the sword-and-sandal cinema. Following the success of Samson, the character was later featured in a series of four films released between 1963 and 1965.

== Plot ==
The treacherous court counselor Warkalla takes possession of the throne of Sulan and of the goods of Queen Mila, replacing her with the beautiful but insignificant Romilda. Samson joins Mila and the rebels to regain the kingdom of Sulan and to hunt Romilda and Warkalla.

== Cast ==
- Brad Harris: Samson
- Alan Steel: Macigno aka Hercules
- Serge Gainsbourg: Warkalla
- Mara Berni: Romilda
- Luisella Boni: Janine (credited as Brigitte Corey)
- Carlo Tamberlani: Botan
- Irena Prosen: Mila
- Franco Gasparri: Mila's son
- Vladimir Leib as Terrabentus

== Reception ==
Serge Gainsbourg's performance as the creepy villain Warkalla has been highlighted as the film's strongpoint.

== Bibliography ==
- Michele Giordano (1998). Giganti buoni. Rome: Gremese Editore. ISBN 8877421835.
- Gianfranco Casadio (2007). I mitici eroi: il cinema ʺpeplumʺ nel cinema italiano dall'avvento del sonoro a oggi (1930-1993). Rome: Longo. ISBN 978-8880635291.
- Hughes, Howard (2011). Cinema Italiano - The Complete Guide From Classics To Cult. London - New York: I.B.Tauris. ISBN 978-1-84885-608-0.
