= Dada Gallotti =

Italian actress (1935–2024)

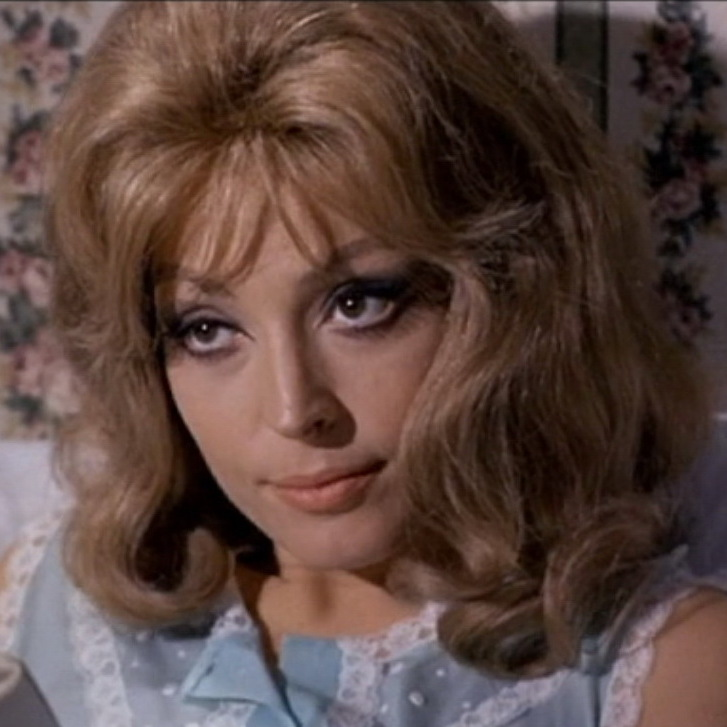
- Gallotti in the movie Gli infermieri della mutua (1969)
- Born: Alda Gallotti; 8 April 1935; Milan, Kingdom of Italy
- Died: 24 April 2024 (aged 89); Rome, Italy
- Other name: Diana Garson
- Occupation: Actress

Dada Gallotti (8 April 1935 – 24 April 2024) was an Italian actress.

== Life and career ==
Born in Milan, Italy, as Alda Gallotti, she was one of the most active character actresses in the 1960s and 1970s. She appeared in several spaghetti Western films under the pseudonym Diana Garson. She retired from acting in the early 1980s.

Gallotti died in Rome on 24 April 2024, at the age of 89.

== Selected filmography ==
- Romulus and the Sabines (1961)
- The Changing of the Guard (1962)
- Taras Bulba, the Cossack (1962)
- Samson vs. the Giant King (1964)
- Hercules and the Treasure of the Incas (1964)
- Left Handed Johnny West (1965)
- Night of Violence (1965)
- Johnny Yuma (1966)
- Lola Colt (1967)
- Vengeance Is Mine (1967)
- Zenabel (1969)
- Flashback (1969)
- Diary of a Telephone Operator (1969)
- Zorro in the Court of England (1969)
- Heads or Tails (1969)
- I due maghi del pallone (1970)
- The Golden Ass (1970)
- Deadly Trackers (1972)
- Frankenstein 80 (1972)
- Naughty Nun (1972)
- God in Heaven... Arizona on Earth (1972)
- Special Killers (1973)
- Sgarro alla camorra (1973)
- Man with the Golden Winchester (1973)
- Reflections in Black (1975)
- Confessions of a Frustrated Housewife (1976)
- The Best (1976)
- Vieni avanti cretino (1982)
