= Enzo Maggio =

Italian actor

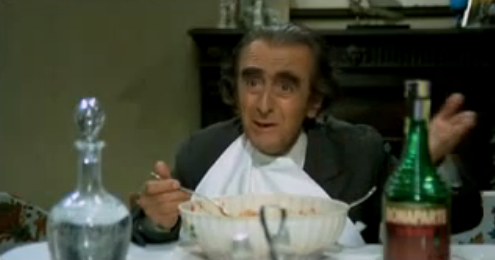
- Enzo Maggio in Flatfoot (1973)
- Born: Vincenzo Maggio; 10 October 1902; Naples, Kingdom of Italy
- Died: 13 July 1978 (aged 75); Naples, Italy
- Occupation: Actor

Enzo Maggio (10 October 1902 – 13 July 1978) was an Italian actor. He was the oldest of the Maggio siblings.

== Career ==
Born Vincenzo Maggio in Naples into a family of actors, Maggio made a long apprenticeship in the avanspettacolo theaters before and during the Second World War. On stage, he was specialized in macchiette and in the impersonation of the comedian Larry Semon (known in Italy as Ridolini). After the war, he decided to devote himself to cinema and had a very prolific career even if often cast in character roles.

Maggio often worked on stage with his brothers and sisters Dante, Beniamino, Pupella and Rosalia.

== Partial filmography ==
- A Dog's Life (1950) - Gigetto
- È arrivato il cavaliere (1950) - Guardia personale del ministro
- Milano miliardaria (1951) - Il parruchiere tifoso
- Viva il cinema! (1952)
- The White Sheik (1952) - Furio
- La nemica (1952)
- Rimorso (1952)
- Siamo tutti inquilini (1953) - Prestanome
- Riscatto (1953)
- A Husband for Anna (1953) - Il fotografo
- The Walk (1953)
- If You Won a Hundred Million (1953) - Beniamino (segment "Il tifoso")
- Lasciateci in pace (1953)
- Cose da pazzi (1954) - Gnauli's assistant
- Ulysses (1954) - (uncredited)
- Prima di sera (1954) - Fantali - the tailor
- Tripoli, Beautiful Land of Love (1954) - Un attore del Caffé-Concerto
- Peppino e la vecchia signora (1954)
- Napoli piange e ride (1954) - Fisarmonica player
- Il cantante misterioso (1955) - Gino
- Graziella (1955) - Servitore del console (uncredited)
- I giorni più belli (1956) - Il tizio
- Due sosia in allegria (1956)
- I vagabondi delle stelle (1956)
- Cantando sotto le stelle (1956) - Cameriere di trattoria
- The Pirate and the Slave Girl (1959) - Candela
- Ferdinando I, re di Napoli (1959) - The Escort of Pat and Cordelia
- My Friend, Dr. Jekyll (1960) - Cameriere del night club
- Caccia al marito (1960) - Salvatore Gargiulo - the hotel valet (uncredited)
- Adua and Her Friends (1960) - Calypso - Stefano's colleague
- Ghosts of Rome (1961) - Fricandò
- The Joy of Living (1961) - Prisoner #888
- Black City (1961) - Il ministro Crescenzo
- Accroche-toi, y'a du vent! (1961)
- Zorro and the Three Musketeers (1963)
- Revenge of the Musketeers (1963)
- Hercules and the Black Pirates (1964)
- 3 Avengers (1964) - Manina
- Bullets and the Flesh (1964) - Cliente Bar
- Super Seven Calling Cairo (1965)
- Johnny Colt (1966)
- The Three Fantastic Supermen (1967) - La Squadra Acrobatica Italiana
- Io non protesto, io amo (1967) - Felice
- Kill Me Quick, I'm Cold (1967)
- Nel sole (1967) - School attendant
- I due vigili (1967) - Remo Cesaroni
- I 2 deputati (1968)
- Ombre roventi (1970)
- Brother Outlaw (1971)
- Il furto è l'anima del commercio!?... (1971) - Agente Lo Cascio
- Er Più – storia d'amore e di coltello (1971) - Old Garibaldian
- When Men Carried Clubs and Women Played Ding-Dong (1971)
- Pistol Packin' Preacher (1971) - Doctor
- Trinity and Sartana Are Coming (1972) - Jeremiah (uncredited)
- Gli altri racconti di Canterbury (1972) - Beppe (segment 'Il pescatore')
- Flatfoot (1973) - Gennarino
- Seven Nuns in Kansas City (1973) - Gin
- Flatfoot in Hong Kong (1975) - Gennarino (final film role)
