= Sergio Bruni =

Italian composer (1921–2003)

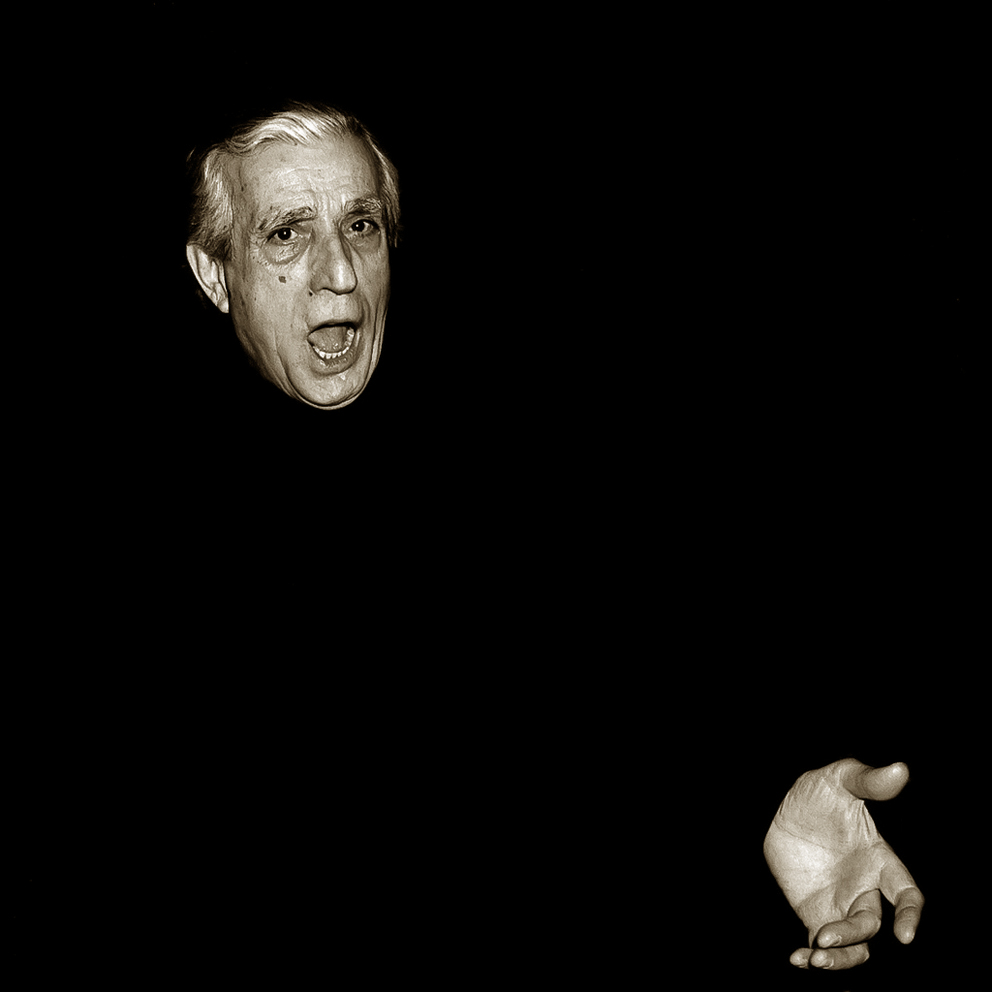
- Bruni in 1995, photographed by Augusto De Luca
- Born: Guglielmo Chianese; 15 September 1921; Villaricca, Naples, Kingdom of Italy
- Died: 22 June 2003 (aged 81); Rome, Italy
- Occupations: Singer; actor; guitarist; songwriter
- Years active: 1944–1990

Guglielmo Chianese (15 September 1921 – 22 June 2003), known professionally Sergio Bruni, was a popular Italian singer, guitarist, and songwriter. He was often called "The Voice of Naples".

He was born in the commune of Villaricca, near Naples, Italy. At nine years of age, he started attending a school of music. Two years later, he was playing clarinet in a local band, which was his first experience as a musician. In 1938, the family moved to Chiaiano, where he started work as a labourer.

In September 1943, while convalescing from the army at home, he heard of the uprising against German troops in Naples. With a number of acquaintances, he joined a group of volunteers to oppose the German army in the vicinity. While returning from an action, he was seriously injured in a firefight with German soldiers, which left him with a permanent limp. After his release from the hospital, he returned to studying music under Vittorio Parisi and had his singing debut at the Royal Theatre in Naples on 14 May 1944.

In October 1944, he won a singing competition, which resulted in a contract with Radio Naples, where he worked under the guidance of Gino Campese.

In 1948, he married Maria Cerulli. They had four daughters.

Over the following years, he had many successes, both live and on recordings. In 1960, he returned to his home in Naples to concentrate on Neapolitan songs. He had a big hit with Carmela (1975), which has since become a classic of the Neapolitan genre, and this was followed up by the album 'a maschera Pulecenella, which led to major television and stage appearances the following year.

In March 2000, he left Naples to join his daughters in Rome. In 2001, he recorded his last song, sung with Lino Blandizzi. He died in a hospital in Rome on 22 June 2003.

== Filmography ==
- Serenata a Maria, directed by Luigi Capuano (1957)
- Che cosa è successo tra mio padre e tua madre? (Avanti!), directed by Billy Wilder (1972)
- Il viaggio, directed by Vittorio De Sica (1974)
