= Raoul Grassilli =

Italian actor

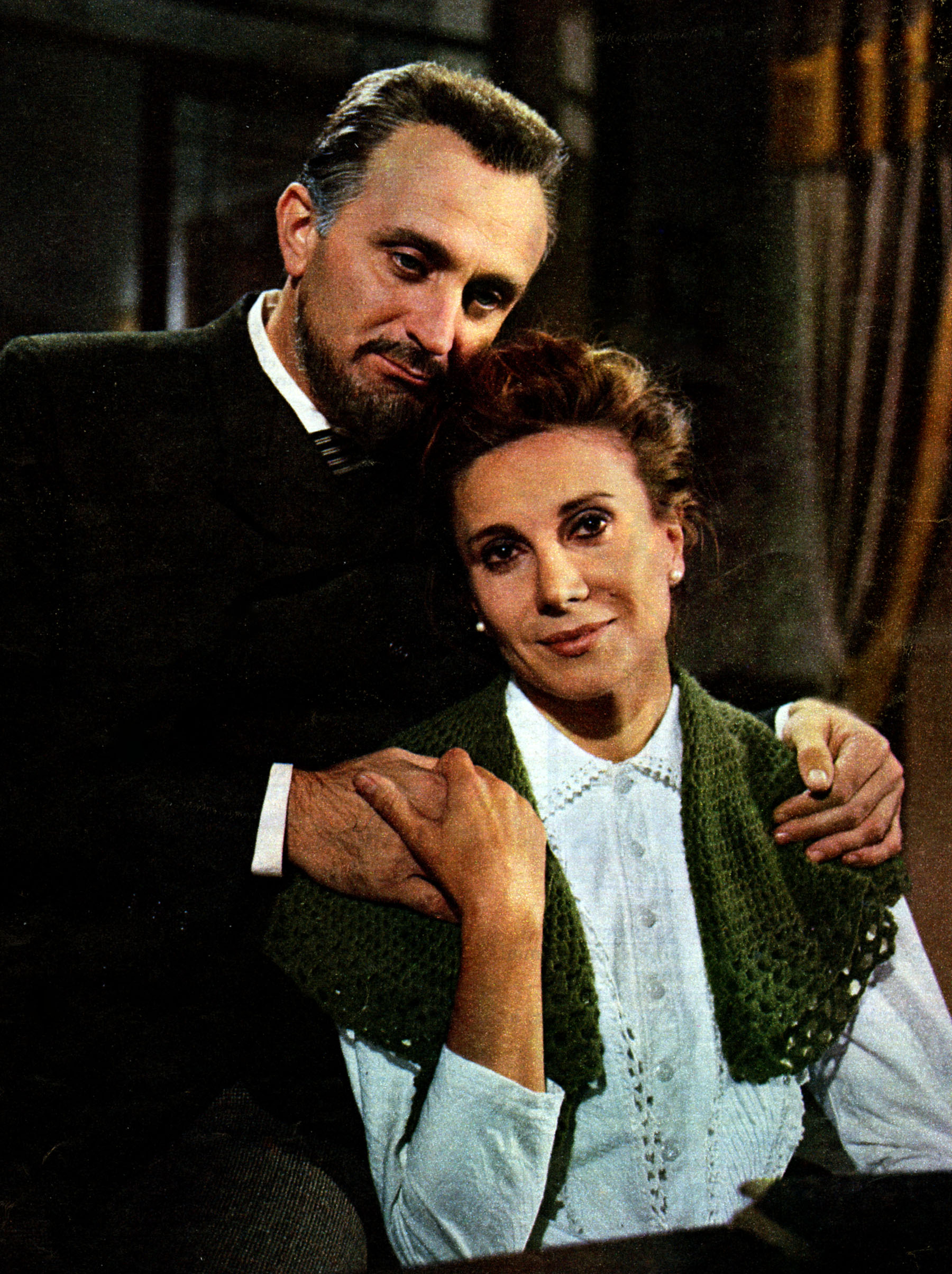
- Grassilli with actress Ileana Ghione in Madame Curie (1965)
- Born: 25 October 1924; Bologna, Italy
- Died: 24 July 2010 (aged 85); Bologna, Italy
- Occupation: Actor

Raoul Grassilli (25 October 1924 – 24 July 2010) was an Italian actor.

Born in Bologna, Grassilli graduated from the Silvio d’Amico Academy of Dramatic Arts in 1948, and started his career on stage with Ruggero Ruggeri. Active among others in the theatrical companies of Alida Valli, Tino Buazzelli, Gino Cervi and Giorgio Strehler, he is best known for his roles in several RAI TV-series, starting from Anton Giulio Majano's Il Caso Maurizius (1961).

== Selected filmography ==
- The Corsican Brothers (1961)
- Pelle viva (1962)
- Invasion 1700 (1962)
- Desert War (1962)
- Catherine of Russia (1963)
- The Head of the Family (1967)
- Giacomo Casanova: Childhood and Adolescence (1969)
- Povero Cristo (1975)
