= The Little Cowboy =

1973 film

- Directed by: Guido Zurli
- Produced by: Türker İnanoğlu
- Starring: Cüneyt Arkın; İlker İnanoğlu; Pascale Petit; Sergio Ciani
- Production company: Erler Film
- Release date: 1973
- Countries: Turkey; Italy
- Language: Turkish

The Little Cowboy (originally titled Küçük Kovboy) is a 1973 Turkish western film, directed by Guido Zurli, starring Cüneyt Arkın.

== Plot ==
Yumurcak lives in a village in the wild west. On his way from school, he is kidnapped by the bandit Demirbilek and his gang. They ask his mom, Maureen for ransom money. Maureen seeks for help and finds Keskin. Keskin is a very sharp shooter, yet since he has caused the death of a child many years ago, he has been inactive for years.

== Selected cast ==
- Cüneyt Arkın as Keskin
- İlker İnanoğlu as Yumurcak
- Pascale Petit as Maureen
- Sergio Ciani as Demirbilek
- Evelyn Stewart as Yumurcak's Mother
