= The Fury of Hercules =

- Directed by: Gianfranco Parolini
- Screenplay by: M. D'Amiens; Angelo DeRiso; Gianfranco Parolini; Giovanni Simonelli; Sergio Sollima
- Story by: Larry Madison
- Produced by: Mario Maggi
- Starring: Brad Harris; Luisella Boni; Mara Berni; Elke Arendt
- Cinematography: Francesco Izzarelli
- Edited by: Mario Sansoni
- Music by: Carlo Innocenzi
- Production companies: Cinematografica Associati; Comptoir Francais du Film Production
- Release date: 21 March 1962 (Italy)
- Running time: 97 minutes
- Countries: Italy; France

The Fury of Hercules (Italian: La furia di Ercole) is a 1962 Sword-and-sandal film written and directed by Gianfranco Parolini.

== Plot ==
Hercules is reached by the slave Daria, who informs him that his country has fallen into the hands of the tyrant Meniste. Hercules follows Daria in his homeland, where he discovers that Meniste enslaves the citizens of the city and that a group of rebels is trying an insurrection. Meniste fears the power of Hercules, however, he kills Daria. So, Hercules puts himself in charge of the band of rebels and destroys the power of Meniste.

== Cast ==
- Brad Harris: Hercules
- Luisella Boni: Daria (as Brigitte Corey)
- Mara Berni: Cnidia
- Serge Gainsbourg: Menistus
- Alan Steel: Kaldos
- Carlo Tamberlani: Eridione
- Irena Prosen: Mila
- Franco Gasparri

== Production ==
The film was shot at Dubrava Film in Zagreb, Croatia and on location in Zagreb.

== Release ==
The Fury of Hercules as released in Italy on 21 March 1962.

== See also ==
- List of Italian films of 1962
- List of films featuring Hercules
