= Heads or Tails (1969 film) =

1969 film

- Directed by: Piero Pierotti
- Written by: Piero Pierotti
- Starring: John Ericson; Špela Rozin; Edwige Fenech
- Cinematography: Fausto Zuccoli
- Edited by: Jolanda Benvenuti
- Music by: Carlo Savina
- Production companies: Romana Film; Tirrenia Film
- Distributed by: Romana Film
- Release date: 4 June 1969
- Running time: 95 minutes
- Country: Italy
- Language: Italian

Heads or Tails (Italian: Testa o croce) is a 1969 Italian western film directed by Piero Pierotti and starring John Ericson, Špela Rozin and Edwige Fenech. It was shot at the Tirrenia Studios.

== Cast ==
- John Ericson as Will Hunter
- Špela Rozin as Shanda Lee
- Franco Lantieri as Serpente
- Daniela Surina as Sybille Burton
- Edwige Fenech as Manuela
- Pinuccio Ardia as Miserere
- Ugo Pagliai as Burton
- Isarco Ravaioli as Sheriff
- Dada Gallotti
- Loris Gizzi
- Renato Navarrini
- Maria Teresa Piaggio
- Pasquale Basile
- Silvana Bacci
- Franco Daddi
- Antonietta Fiorito

== Bibliography ==
- Thomas Weisser. Spaghetti Westerns: The Good, the Bad, and the Violent : a Comprehensive, Illustrated Filmography of 558 Eurowesterns and Their Personnel, 1961-1977. McFarland, 1992.
