= George Mikell =

Lithuanian-Australian actor and writer (1929–2020)

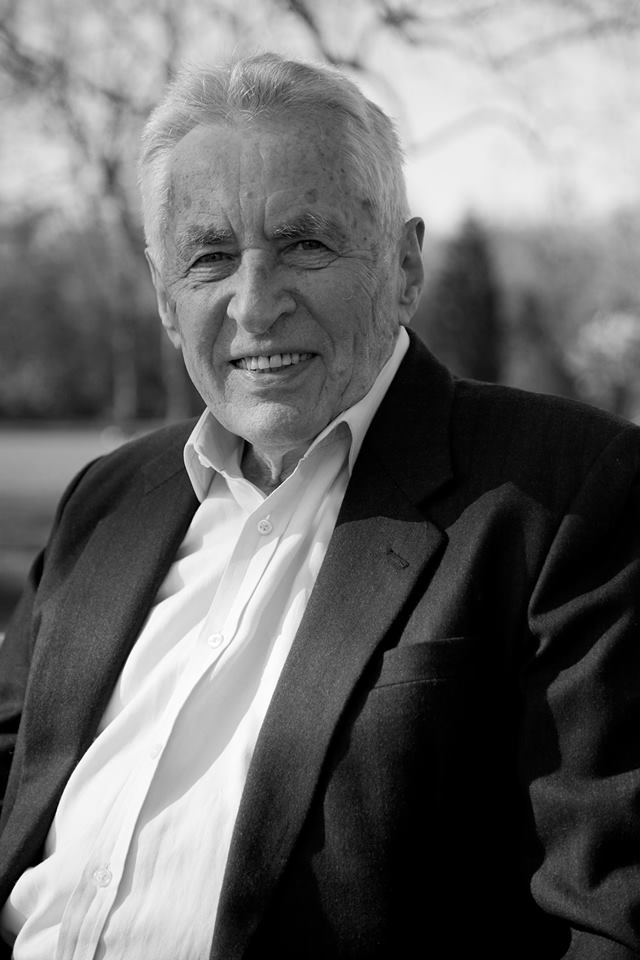
- Mikell in March 2017
- Born: Jurgis Mikelaitis; 4 April 1929; Bildeniai, Tauragė district, Lithuania
- Died: 12 May 2020 (aged 91); London, United Kingdom
- Occupations: Actor, writer
- Years active: 1957–2020
- Known for: The Guns of Navarone; The Great Escape
- Height: 6 ft 0 in (183 cm)
- Website: http://www.georgemikell.co.uk/

George Mikell (born Jurgis Mikelaitis; 4 April 1929 – 12 May 2020) was a Lithuanian-Australian actor and writer best known for his performances as Schutzstaffel (SS) officers in The Guns of Navarone (1961) and The Great Escape (1963). Mikell appeared in over 30 British and American feature films and had numerous leading roles in theatre.

After retiring from acting, Mikell wrote two film scripts, numerous short stories and in 2002 published an essay of his 2001 trip to the North-West Frontier Province of Pakistan.

== Selected filmography ==
- The One That Got Away (1957) – German Prisoner
- Kill Her Gently (1957) – Lars Svenson
- Sea of Sand (1958) – German Officer
- Operation Bullshine (1959) – German Airman
- Carve Her Name with Pride (1959) - German Officer (uncredited)
- Whirlpool (1959) – German Policeman
- The Treasure of San Teresa (1959) – Border guard
- Jackpot (1960) – Carl Stock
- Beyond the Curtain (1960) – Pieter von Seefeldt
- A Circle of Deception (1960) – German Officer (uncredited)
- The Guns of Navarone (1961) – Capt. Sessler
- Highway to Battle (1961) – Brauwitz
- The Primitives (1961) – Claude
- The Password Is Courage (1962) – Necke
- Mystery Submarine (1963) – Lt. Remer
- The Gentle Terror (1963) – Turk
- The Great Escape (1963) – Capt. Dietrich
- The Victors (1963) – Russian Sentry
- Operation Crossbow (1965) – German Officer at V2 Launch
- The Spy Who Came In from the Cold (1965) – Checkpoint Charlie Guard
- Dateline Diamonds (1965) – Paul Verlekt
- Raiders of the Sahara (1965) – Ronald Wayne
- Where the Spies Are (1966) – Assassin
- Sabina V'Hagvarim (1966)
- The Double Man (1967) – Max Gruner
- Attack on the Iron Coast (1968) – Captain Strasser
- Doppelgänger (1969) – Paris Delegate Clavel
- Zeppelin (1971) – German Officer
- Young Winston (1972) – Field Cornet (uncredited)
- Scorpio (1973) – Dor
- The Tamarind Seed (1974) – Major Stukalov
- Sweeney 2 (1978) – Superintendent
- The Sea Wolves (1980) – Ehrenfels Captain
- Escape to Victory (1981) – POW Camp Commander
- Code Name: Emerald (1985) – Major Seltz
- Night of the Fox (1990) – Maj. Hecker
