= Fasthand =

1973 film

- Italian theatrical release poster
- Directed by: Frank Bronston
- Written by: Alberto Cardone; Eduardo Manzanos Brochero; Vittorio Salerno; Vinicio Marinucci (dialogue)
- Produced by: Eduardo Manzanos Brochero
- Starring: Alan Steel; William Berger; Frank Braña
- Cinematography: Emilio Foriscot
- Edited by: Giancarlo Venarucci (as Giancarlo Venarucci Cadueri)
- Music by: Gianni Ferrio
- Production companies: Copercines, Cooperativa Cinematográfica; New Films
- Distributed by: France-Inter Cinéma (1975, France); Jugendfilm-Verleih (1974, West Germany)
- Release date: 1973
- Countries: Italy; Spain
- Language: Italian

Fasthand (Italian: Mi chiamavano "Requiescat"... ma avevano sbagliato, Spanish: Mano rápida, also known as Fasthand is Still My Name and Fast Gun Is Still My Name) is a 1973 Italian-Spanish Spaghetti Western film directed by Frank Bronston and starring Alan Steel, William Berger and Frank Braña.

== Synopsis ==
Shortly after the end of United States civil war, Captain Jeff Madison, a Union Official, leads a group of soldiers in the search for a group of Confederate soldiers who have gone rogue and are conducting a guerrilla war in the South. The rebel group, led by the infamous Machedo, splits in two, and while one faction ambushes Madison and his party the other one captures one of the Union's forts and decimate the soldiers and commanding officer. Shortly after the rebels capture Madison, the only survivor of the previous ambush, when he gets to the fort. Machedo and his men torture and shoot Madison in his right hand, rendering it useless for holding a gun, and leave him to die. Madison survives by pure chance when a group of Indians appear by the location.

During the next two years the group of rebels and former soldiers carry a series of raids undisturbed, while at the same time Madison has been preparing to exact justice on them. When Machedo and his men steal the freshly arrived gold of a town, Madison sees the perfect opportunity to manipulate the situation in his favour, bringing Machedo and his group to a trap. The former Captain risks everything carrying out his plan but, contrary to the expectations of Machedo, Madison still has a secret card on his sleeve, one that makes him a true "fasthand".

== Cast ==
- Alan Steel as Cpt. Jeff Madison
- William Berger as Machedo
- Frank Brana as Quincy
- Fernando Bilbao as Duero
- Gill Rolland as Harrueco
- Celine Bessy as Swan
- Francisco Sanz as Joe Smart
- Welma Truccolo as Mary Ann Cruz
- Francesco D'Adda as Pracownik, Bank teller
- Ettore Ribotta as Bank manager
- Sergio Dolfin as Mayor
- Stefano Oppedisano as Machedo Gang Member
- Aldo Cecconi as Sheriff
- Angelo Boscariol as Sgt. Carter
- Filippo Perego as Major
- Rodolfo Lodi as Deputy
- Aldo Sisti
- Duilio Olmi as Saloon Patron
- Artemio Antonini as Machedo Gang Member
- Omero Capanna as Northern Soldier
- Giuseppe Cardone as Saloon Barkeeper
- Alfonso Giganti as Man in saloon
- Lorenzo Robledo as Jack, Hearse Driver
