= Carlo Tamberlani =

Italian actor (1899–1980)

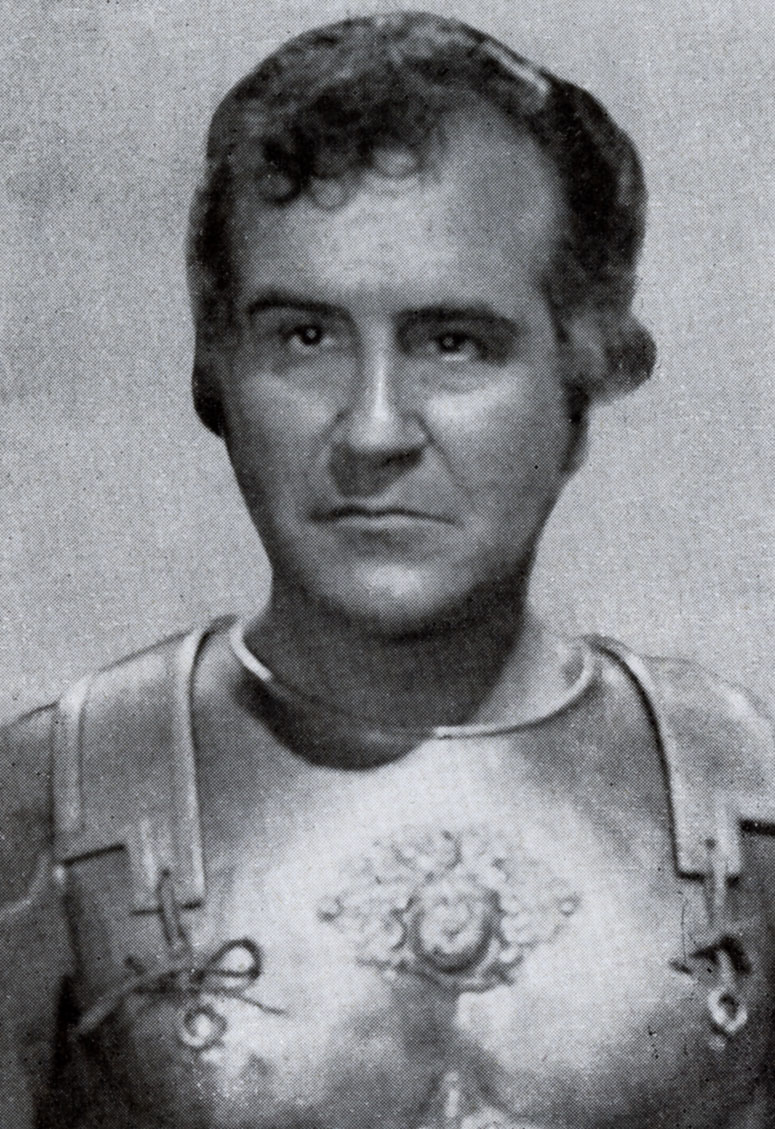
- 1954 photograph of Tamberlani
- Born: 11 March 1899; Salice Salentino, Apulia, Kingdom of Italy
- Died: 5 August 1980 (aged 81); Subiaco, Lazio, Italy
- Occupation: Actor
- Years active: 1931–1976

Carlo Tamberlani (11 March 1899 – 5 August 1980) was an Italian film actor. He appeared in 127 films between 1931 and 1976. His brother Nando Tamberlani was also an actor.

== Life and career ==
Born in Salice Salentino, Tamberlani was born in a family of actors and made his debut in his father's stage company. After working with some of the major companies of the time he founded his own company with the actress Bella Starace Sainati and later served as vice-director of the Ermete Zacconi's stage company. Between 1936 and 1939 he worked as acting teacher at the Accademia di Arte Drammatica.

== Selected filmography ==
- The Devil's Lantern (1931)
- Loyalty of Love (1934) - Luigi Parravicini
- Red Passport (1935) - L'ufficiale comandante le truppe
- Scipio Africanus: The Defeat of Hannibal (1937) - Ambasciatore Romano
- Condottieri (1937) - Il duca d'Urbino
- The Count of Brechard (1938) - Carlo, Visconte di Bréchard
- Giuseppe Verdi (1938) - Demalde
- Lotte nell'ombra (1938)
- La Damigella di Bard (1938) - Ferdinandi di Bard
- Guest for One Night (1939) - Jean Berry
- The Fornaretto of Venice (1939) - Mocenigo
- Tredici uomini e un cannone (1939) - La sentinella
- The Boarders at Saint-Cyr (1939) - Gioacchino Murat
- The Hotel of the Absent (1939) - Marisol, l'ubriaco
- Il ladro sono io (1940) - Giorgio
- Siege of the Alcázar (1940) - Il capitano Vincenzo Alba
- Giuliano de' Medici (1941) - Lorenzo de' Medici
- Piccolo mondo antico (1941) - Don Costa
- Pia de' Tolomei (1941) - Nello della Pietra
- The Mask of Cesare Borgia (1941) - Jacopo Bentivoglio
- Il cavaliere senza nome (1941) - Gomez della Nevada
- Turbine (1941) - Don Antonio
- A Woman Has Fallen (1941) - Il medico del pronto soccorso
- La sonnambula (1941) - Agostino
- Souls in Turmoil (1942) - Il professore Alberto Ferrari
- Document Z-3 (1942)
- Perdizione (1942) - Il medico
- Bengasi (1942) - Giovanni Galassi
- Le vie del cuore (1942) - Filippo Navarria, suo fratello
- Notte di fiamme (1942)
- Measure for Measure (1943) - Il reggente Angelo
- Redemption (1943) - Giuseppe Madidini
- Fever (1943) - Saverio Grantèr
- Fantastic Night (1943) - Defensor de Pablo (uncredited)
- L'abito nero da sposa (1945) - Andrea Strozzi
- The Ten Commandments (1945)
- La sua strada (1946)
- L'apocalisse (1947)
- Bullet for Stefano (1947) - Marshal Borghi
- La monaca di Monza (1947)
- Buried Alive (1949) - Conte Capecci
- The Walls of Malapaga (1949) - Le commissaire / Il commissario
- Adamo ed Eva (1949) - Il messagero
- Sicilian Uprising (1949) - Abate Di Santo Spirito
- I peggiori anni della nostra vita (1949)
- Il bacio di una morta (1949) - Il barone Riccardi
- Margaret of Cortona (1950) - Vescovo
- Santo disonore (1950) - Conte Rinaldi
- Cavalcade of Heroes (1950) - Pisacane
- Due sorelle amano (1950) - Sisters' father
- Il richiamo nella tempesta (1950)
- Under the Skies of the Asturias (1951) - Fray Atanasio
- Doubt (1951) - Comisario
- Facing the Sea (1951) - Alberto
- Catalina de Inglaterra (1951)
- The Evil Forest (1951) - Gurnemancio, el apóstol
- A Thief in Paradise (1952) - San Giuseppe
- La figlia del diavolo (1952) - Conte Vincenzo Terzi
- Perseguidos (1952)
- Noi peccatori (1953) - L'oculista (uncredited)
- Nero and the Burning of Rome (1953) - Tigellino
- Captain Phantom (1953)
- Frine, Courtesan of Orient (1953) - Assirione
- Soli per le strade (1953)
- Pietà per chi cade (1954) - The judge
- Loving You Is My Sin (1954) - Monti - Elena's father
- New Moon (1955) - Avvocato difensore
- Suonno d'ammore (1955) - Michele Loiacono
- Adriana Lecouvreur (1955)
- Amici per la pelle (1955) - Il padre di Franco
- Folgore Division (1955) - Santini's Friend
- Una sera di maggio (1955) - Giorgio Biamonti
- Scapricciatiello (1955) - Avvocato Ronca - The notary public
- Il conte Aquila (1955)
- Altair (1956)
- Incatenata dal destino (1956)
- Alone in the Streets (1956) - Police Commissioner
- I giorni più belli (1956) - Il sacerdote
- Nero's Weekend (1956) - Senator
- Mermaid of Naples (1956) - Maruzzella's Father
- Guaglione (1956) - Marisa 's Father
- Amaramente (1956) - Commissario Barni
- Occhi senza luce (1956)
- Io, Caterina (1957)
- Saranno uomini (1957)
- Il ricatto di un padre (1957) - Mario Guarnieri
- The Knight of the Black Sword (1957) - Antonio
- Orizzonte infuocato (1957) - Padre di Gabriele
- Il Conte di Matera (1958) - L'architetto
- Adorabili e bugiarde (1958) - Rossi the Chief Editor
- Slave Women of Corinth (1958) - Matteo
- Il padrone delle ferriere (1959)
- Cavalier in Devil's Castle (1959) - Conte Oliviero
- Le fric (1959) - Morassi
- The Last Days of Pompeii (1959) - Olinto, Christian Leader
- Attack of the Moors (1959) - Duke of Chateau Roux
- Son of Samson (1960) - Pharaoh Armiteo I
- Minotaur, the Wild Beast of Crete (1960) - Minosse - King of Crete
- Constantine and the Cross (1961) - Diocletian
- Conqueror of Maracaibo (1961) - Governor
- The Colossus of Rhodes (1961) - Xenon
- Vanina Vanini (1962)
- The Giant of Metropolis (1961)
- The Trojan Horse (1961) - Priam
- Samson (1961) - Botan
- The Fury Of Hercules (1962) - Eridione
- The Hot Port of Hong Kong (1962) - Dr. Ellington
- Zorro in the Court of Spain (1962) - Marchese Pedro Di Villa Verde
- Caesar the Conqueror (1962) - Pompey
- 79 A.D. (1962) - Furius
- The Old Testament (1962) - Mattatia
- The Black Panther of Ratana (1963) - Pater Antonio
- Duel at the Rio Grande (1963) - Alcalde
- Hercules Against Rome (1964) - Imperatore Gordiano
- Maciste in King Solomon's Mines (1964) - Zelea
- The Lion of Thebes (1964) - Menophis
- Seven Slaves Against the World (1964) - Lucius Terentius
- Hercules and the Treasure of the Incas (1964) - Burt Nixon
- Samson and His Mighty Challenge (1964)
- Triumph of the Ten Gladiators (1964) - Publio Rufo
- 3 Avengers (1964) - King Igos
- 13 Days to Die (1965) - Barrington
- Legacy of the Incas (1965) - Anciano
- Seven Rebel Gladiators (1965) - King Krontal
- I predoni del Sahara (1965) - Lord Flatters
- Kommissar X – In den Klauen des goldenen Drachen (1965) - Jonathan Taylor
- ''The Drums of Tabu'' (1966) - Inspector Duras
- The Three Fantastic Supermen (1967) - Professor Schwarz
- Death Trip (1967) - Konsul Snyder
- If You Meet Sartana Pray for Your Death (1968) - Reverend Logan
- La scoperta (1969)
- Sabata (1969) - Nichols
- Sotto a chi tocca! (1972) - Prior of the Monastery
- Counselor at Crime (1973) - Don Michele Villabate
- The Divine Nymph (1975) - Majordomo Pasqualino
- Illustrious Corpses (1976) - Archbishop
