= Loris Gizzi =

Italian actor

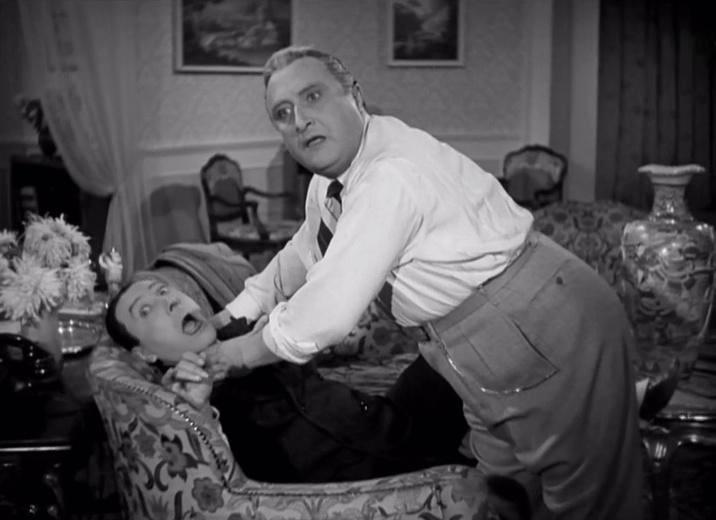
- Gizzi strangles Erminio Macario in a scene of The Innocent Casimiro (1945)
- Born: 16 August 1899; Rome, Kingdom of Italy
- Died: 6 October 1986 (aged 87); Rome, Italy
- Occupation: Actor

Loris Gizzi (16 August 1899 – 6 October 1986) was an Italian actor.

== Life and career ==
Born in Rome, after his university studies Gizzi attended a school of dance and singing. He abandoned the courses when he became an employee of Ferrovie dello Stato, reaching the rank of sub-station master. In the 1930s, he discovered his vocation as an actor, attending several dramatic societies. In 1935, during an outdoor show on the Palatine Hill in honor of royal guests, he was chosen to play Remus in the drama play Rumon; from then he entered the most important stage companies of the time, notably appearing in the 1938 representation of Francesca da Rimini by Gabriele D'Annunzio, staged by Renato Simoni and with Andreina Pagnani in the title role. Active in films since 1933, he had an intense career as a character actor, mostly cast in humorous roles. He played Gioachino Rossini several times, with whom he shared a physical resemblance. He was also active as a voice actor and a dubber.

== Selected filmography ==
- Black Shirt (1933) - Un acceso sovversivo
- I'll Always Love You (1933) - Meregalli
- I'll Give a Million (1935) - Un ricco (uncredited)
- The Affairs of Maupassant (1935) - Dr. Walitzky
- Territorial Militia (1936)
- Lo squadrone bianco (1936) - Un turista (uncredited)
- The Amnesiac (1936) - Mario Tiana
- The Two Sergeants (1936) - (uncredited)
- Ginevra degli Almieri (1936)
- Condottieri (1937) - Malatesta
- I due barbieri (1937)
- For Men Only (1938) - Ladislao Paszkowsky, il regista
- Se quell'idiota ci pensasse... (1939)
- Assenza ingiustificata (1939)
- Il segreto inviolabile (1939) - Il signor Smith
- Torna, caro ideal! (1939) - Lord Cameron
- Il ladro sono io (1940)
- L'ultimo combattimento (1941) - Carrel
- The Betrothed (1941) - Il capitano delle guardie (uncredited)
- La sonnambula (1941) - Gioachino Rossini
- I Live as I Please (1942) - Il tenore
- Headlights in the Fog (1942) - Rico
- The Black Panther (1942) - L'ispettore Jackmil
- The Adventures of Fra Diavolo (1942) - Il prefetto
- I sette peccati (1942) - Gustavo Mazzoni
- Violets in Their Hair (1942) - Il padre di Alda
- Sealed Lips (1942) - L'avvocato difensore di Carlo
- Maria Malibran (1943) - Giovacchino Rossini
- Lascia cantare il cuore (1943) - Massimo Rossi
- Gioco d'azzardo (1943)
- Sempre più difficile (1943) - Il sindaco di Marina Rossa
- I'll Always Love You (1943) - Meregalli (uncredited)
- In cerca di felicità (1944) - Il cantante Fasola
- The Priest's Hat (1944) - Il marchese Usilli
- The Materassi Sisters (1944) - Il sacerdote
- The Ten Commandments (1945)
- The Innocent Casimiro (1945) - Gustavo Corra
- Come Back to Sorrento (1945)
- Black Eagle (1946)
- Lost Happiness (1946) - Medico
- We Are Not Married (1946)
- Il mondo vuole così (1946)
- The Great Dawn (1947) - Cooky
- Il vento m'ha cantato una canzone (1947)
- L'apocalisse (1947)
- Difficult Years (1948) - Il ministro
- L'isola di Montecristo (1948)
- Totò al giro d'Italia (1948)
- Vivere a sbafo (1949)
- Santo disonore (1950)
- Accidents to the Taxes!! (1951) - Il capufficcio tasse
- Nobody's Children (1951) - Il direttore del collegio (uncredited)
- The Steamship Owner (1951) - Il direttore del Grand Hotel
- My Heart Sings (1951) - Commendator Cocciaglia
- Napoleon (1951) - Barras
- Destiny (1951) - Filippo Borcello
- Ha da venì... don Calogero! (1952) - Dottore
- The Overcoat (1952)
- La storia del fornaretto di Venezia (1952)
- Il tallone di Achille (1952) - Psicanalista Gregorius
- Nerone e Messalina (1953) - Decius Metellus
- Easy Years (1953) - Un fascista
- Verdi, the King of Melody (1953) - Gioacchino Rossini
- La prigioniera di Amalfi (1954)
- Neapolitan Carousel (1954) - Erik Gustaffson
- schiava del peccato (1954) - Customer in the Nightclub (uncredited)
- Theodora, Slave Empress (1954) - Smirnos
- The Three Thieves (1954) - Man soliciting funds from Tapioca (uncredited)
- Cardinal Lambertini (1954) - Count Orsi
- Milanese in Naples (1954) - Presidente della società
- Amore e smarrimento (1954)
- Disowned (1954)
- Are We Men or Corporals? (1955) - Il tenore
- The Song of the Heart (1955)
- The Two Friends (1955) - Un invitato
- Beautiful but Dangerous (1955) - Duval
- La catena dell'odio (1955)
- Da qui all'eredità (1955)
- Rigoletto e la sua tragedia (1956) - Il conte di Ceprano
- Difendo il mio amore (1956)
- The Violent Patriot (1956)
- Wives and Obscurities (1956) - Signor Baglioni
- Amaramente (1956) - Un invitato alla festa
- Io, Caterina (1957)
- Susanna tutta panna (1957)
- Serenate per 16 bionde (1957) - The Housebuilder
- Adorable and a Liar (1958) - Court Clerk
- L'amore nasce a Roma (1958) - Mr. Connolly
- Mia nonna poliziotto (1958) - Primario della clinica
- The Devil's Cavaliers (1959) - Prosecutor
- Caterina Sforza, la leonessa di Romagna (1959) - Checco Orsi
- Agosto, donne mie non vi conosco (1959)
- Avventura in città (1959)
- Un militare e mezzo (1960) - Pharmaceutical Chief
- Il carro armato dell'8 settembre (1960)
- Pirates of the Coast (1960) - Don Fernando Linares
- Constantine and the Cross (1961) - Roman Prosecutor
- Guns of the Black Witch (1961) - Governor
- The Secret of the Black Falcon (1961) - Don Pedro Ordigaso
- Some Like It Cold (1961)
- Queen of the Seas (1961) - Prison Director
- Suleiman the Conqueror (1961) - Suleiman II
- Ten Italians for One German (1962) - The German Consul in Rome
- Duel of Fire (1962) - L'intendente
- Swordsman of Siena (1962) - Councillor (uncredited)
- La donna degli altri è sempre più bella (1963) - Commendator Bartoloni (segment "La dirittura morale")
- Samson and the Slave Queen (1963) - Don Alvarez
- Hercules and the Masked Rider (1963) - Pedro - The King's Envoy
- Sword in the Shadows (1963) - Zio Roger
- Panic Button (1964)
- James Tont operazione U.N.O. (1965) - Goldsinger
- Giant of the Evil Island (1965) - The Doctor
- James Tont operazione D.U.E. (1966) - Mr. Spring
- The Son of Black Eagle (1968) - Procopovic
- I due crociati (1968)
- Black Talisman (1969)
- Heads or Tails (1969)
- Isabella, duchessa dei diavoli (1969) - Bassompierre the King's Marshal
- Zorro, the Navarra Marquis (1969) - Don Ignazio - Alcalde
