= Fanny Marchiò =

Italian actress

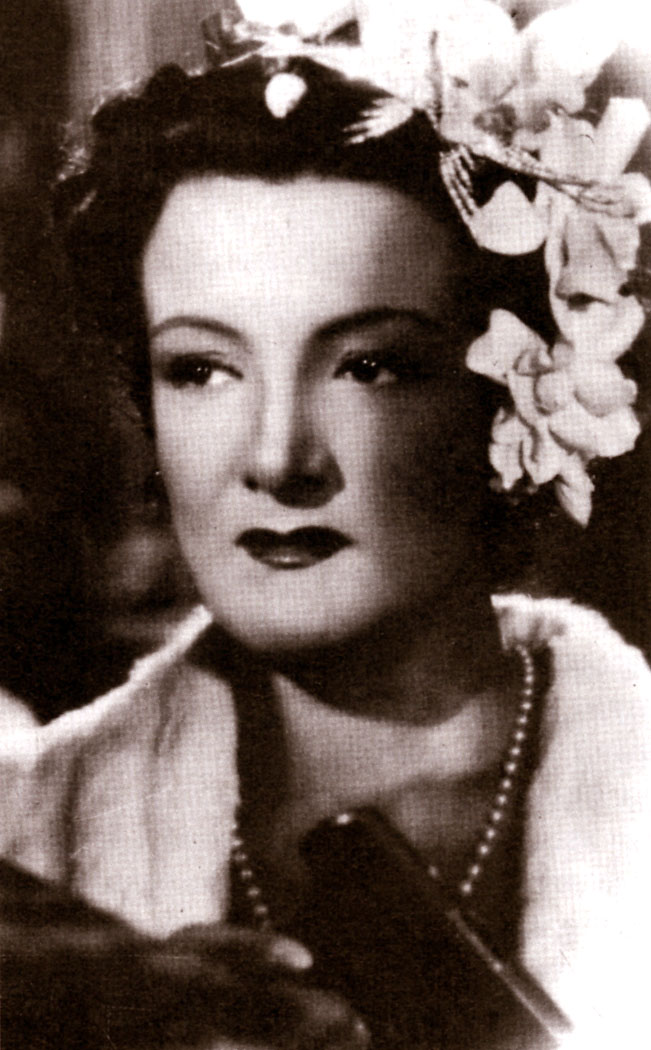
- Fanny Marchiò in 1941.
- Born: 1 June 1904; Corfu, Greece
- Died: 6 September 1980 (aged 76); Bologna, Emilia-Romagna, Italy
- Other name: Francesca Marchiò
- Occupation: Actress
- Years active: 1921-1974 (Film & TV)

Fanny Marchiò (1904–1980) was an Italian stage, film and television actress. She was born in Corfu to an Italian family, her parents were both actors.

She was married to Renato Navarrini.

== Selected filmography ==
- The Lady in White (1938)
- For Men Only (1938)
- In High Places (1943)
- Variety Lights (1950)
- Without a Flag (1951)
- The White Sheik (1952)

== Bibliography ==
- Goble, Alan. The Complete Index to Literary Sources in Film. Walter de Gruyter, 1999.
