= Renato Navarrini =

Italian actor

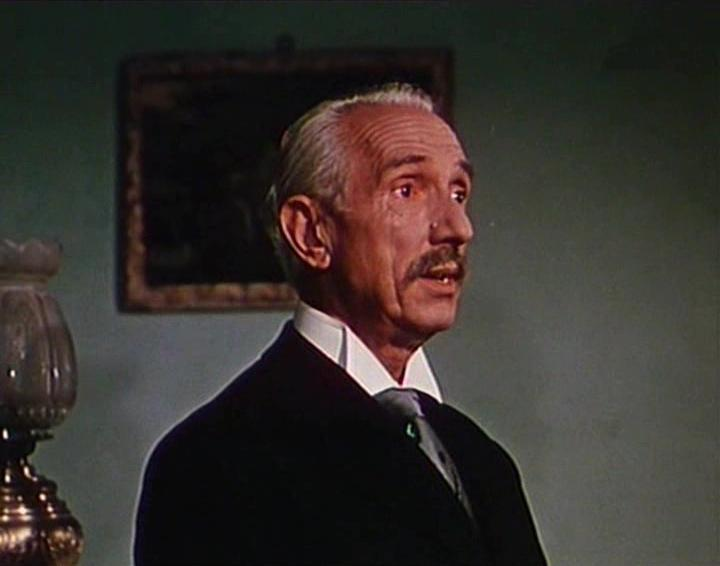
- Born: 18 August 1892; La Spezia, Liguria, Italy
- Died: 20 January 1972 (aged 79); Savona, Liguria, Italy
- Other name: Renato Navarini
- Occupation: Actress
- Years active: 1932-1972 (film)

Renato Navarrini (1892–1972) was an Italian stage and film actor.

== Personal life ==
He was married to the actress Fanny Marchiò.

== Partial filmography ==
- La tavola dei poveri (1932)
- Un cattivo soggetto (1933)
- Lohengrin (1936) - Il direttore dell'hotel
- Pietro Micca (1938) - Agostino di Sale
- Tutta la vita in una notte (1938) - (uncredited)
- Veneno do Pecado (1938) - (uncredited)
- Fuochi d'artificio (1938) - (uncredited)
- Fanfulla da Lodi (1940)
- Giuliano de' Medici (1941) - Il poliziano
- Il signore a doppio petto (1941)
- Marco Visconti (1941)
- The Mask of Cesare Borgia (1941)
- The Pirates of Malaysia (1941)
- L'ultimo addio (1942)
- A Pistol Shot (1942) - Il capitono Ivanov (uncredited)
- La bella addormentata (1942)
- Il fanciullo del West (1942)
- Jealousy (1942) - L'avvocato dell' accusa
- The Woman of Sin (1942)
- Mater dolorosa (1943)
- Tempesta sul golfo (1943) - Ceremoniere di corte
- La danza del fuoco (1943)
- La maschera e il volto (1943)
- Il cappello da prete (1944)
- Bluebeard's Six Wives (1950)
- Miracle in Milan (1951) - Un povero (uncredited)
- The Three Thieves (1954)
- Bread, Love and Jealousy (1954) - Un attore di varietà
- Napoli terra d'amore (1954)
- Piscatore 'e Pusilleco (1954)
- La ladra (1955) - Il Dottore
- Cantami buongiorno tristezza (1955) - The Notary Public (uncredited)
- Allow Me, Daddy! (1956) - Manfredi
- The Sword and the Cross (1956)
- Engaged to Death (1957)
- The Black Archer (1959) - Frate Lorenzo
- The Pirate and the Slave Girl (1959) - Omar
- Capitani di ventura (1961)
- Planets Against Us (I pianeti contro di noi) (1962)
- Venus Against the Son of Hercules (1962)
- Re Manfredi (1962)
- The Black Duke (1963) - Fortune-Teller
- Hercules and the Masked Rider (1963) - Don Francisco
- La ballata dei mariti (1963) - The Thief
- The Terror of Rome Against the Son of Hercules (1964)
- Hercules Against the Barbarians (1964)
- Hercules Against Rome (1964) - Argeso
- La moglie giapponese (1968)
- Black Talisman (1969)
- Heads or Tails (1969)
- La grande avventura di Scaramouche (1972) - (final film role)

== Bibliography ==
- Luca Verdone. I film di Alessandro Blasetti. Gremese Editore, 1989.
