= Zorro and the Three Musketeers =

- Directed by: Luigi Capuano
- Written by: Roberto Gianviti; Italo De Tuddo
- Produced by: Marino Vaccà
- Starring: Gordon Scott
- Cinematography: Carlo Bellero
- Music by: Carlo Savina
- Production companies: Alta Vista; Jonia Film
- Distributed by: Jonia Film
- Release date: 1963
- Country: Italy
- Language: Italian

Zorro and the Three Musketeers (Italian: Zorro e i tre moschettieri, also known as Mask of the Musketeers and Zorro vs. the Three Musketeers) is a 1963 Italian comedy-adventure film directed by Luigi Capuano and starring Gordon Scott.

== Plot ==
In the 17th century, Zorro joins forces with the Three Musketeers to rescue a princess kidnapped by a Spanish emissary.

== Cast ==
- Gordon Scott as Zorro
- José Greci as Isabella
- Giacomo Rossi Stuart as Athos
- Livio Lorenzon as Porthos
- Roberto Risso as Aramis
- Nazzareno Zamperla as D'Artagnan
- Franco Fantasia as Count of Sevilla
- Nerio Bernardi as Cardinal Richelieu
- Gianni Rizzo as King Philip
- Maria Grazia Spina as Manuela
- Mario Pisu as Count of Tequel
- Ignazio Leone as Sancho
- Giuseppe Addobbati
- Ignazio Balsamo
- Enzo Maggio
- Renato Malavasi
- Ugo Sasso
- Bruno Scipioni
- Charles Fawcett
- Benito Stefanelli
- Nando Tamberlani
