= Pelle viva =

- Directed by: Giuseppe Fina
- Written by: Giuseppe Fina
- Starring: Elsa Martinelli
- Cinematography: Antonio Macasoli
- Music by: Carlo Rustichelli
- Release date: 1962
- Country: Italy
- Language: Italian

Pelle viva (Scorched Skin) is a 1962 Italian drama film written and directed by Giuseppe Fina.

The film entered the 23rd Venice International Film Festival, in which it received a special mention. In 2008 it was restored and shown as part of the retrospective "Questi fantasmi: Cinema italiano ritrovato" at the 65th Venice International Film Festival.

== Plot ==
The story of Rosaria, a woman from Apulia, who works in Milan and returns to her village each Saturday to see her illegitimate little boy, who is in a charitable institution.

== Cast ==
- Elsa Martinelli: Rosaria
- Raoul Grassilli: Andrea Morelli
- Lia Rainer
- Narcisa Bonati
- Franco Sportelli
- Franco Nero
