= For One Thousand Dollars Per Day =

1966 film

- Directed by: Silvio Amadio
- Cinematography: Mario Pacheco
- Music by: Gino Peguri
- Release date: 1966
- Language: Italian

For One Thousand Dollars Per Day (Italian: Per mille dollari al giorno, Spanish: Por mil dólares al día, also known as Renegade Gunfighter) is a 1966 Italian-Spanish Spaghetti Western film directed by Silvio Amadio. The title song ""My Gun is Fast" is performed by Bobby Solo.

== Cast ==
- Zachary Hatcher as Hud Backer
- Mimmo Palmara as Sheriff Steven Benson
- Pier Angeli as Betty Benson
- Rubén Rojo as Jason Clark
- Mirko Ellis as Wayne Clark
- José Calvo as Carranza
