= Serenata a Maria =

1957 film

- Directed by: Luigi Capuano
- Written by: Luigi Capuano; Alfredo Giannetti
- Produced by: Fortunato Misiano
- Starring: Maria Fiore; Sergio Bruni
- Cinematography: Augusto Tiezzi
- Edited by: Jolanda Benvenuti
- Music by: Michele Cozzoli
- Release date: 1957
- Country: Italy
- Language: Italian

Serenata a Maria (literally "Serenade for Maria") is a 1957 Italian musical melodrama film co-written and directed by Luigi Capuano and starring Maria Fiore and Sergio Bruni.

== Trama ==
When Stefano Apicella, after having completed his studies at a music conservatory with the help of an uncle, returns to the town, he finds that the creditors are seizing his uncle's boats. Fortunately, a friend of Stefano's, the painter Pasqualino, with a brilliant cheat, saves the situation. In the village Stefano meets Maria, for whom he had a tender feeling in other times, and little by little love is rekindled between the two. But during Stefano's absence, Maria met Renato, an unscrupulous man who deceived her and made her a mother, and now threatens a scandal, thus forcing Maria to leave the country. In the meantime Stefano has put together an orchestra and the success brought back to town leads him to move with his companions to the city, where success is renewed, and the ensemble can be produced on radio and television. Stefano learned by chance the painful story of Maria and during the TV broadcast he addresses simple and affectionate expressions to the woman he loves, which only she can understand. Mary receives the secret message and after various alternatives, the two can crown their dream of love on the day when Mary's little daughter receives Confirmation.

== Cast ==
- Maria Fiore as Pupella Cagliano
- Sergio Bruni as Stefano Rota
- Leda Gloria as Pupella's mother
- Pietro De Vico as Pasqualino, the painter
- Marisa Belli as Maria, Pupella's sister
- Andrea Aureli as Alfredo, Maria's lover
- Amedeo Trilli as Salvatore Rota
- Pina Gallini as The Shopkeeper
- Nerio Bernardi
