= Alan Steel =

Italian bodybuilder and actor

- Born: Sergio Ciani; 7 September 1935; Rome, Kingdom of Italy
- Died: 5 September 2015 (aged 79); Ostia, Rome, Italy
- Occupation: actor
- Years active: 1959-1979
- Height: 5 ft 11 in (180 cm)

Sergio Ciani (7 September 1935 – 5 September 2015), best known as Alan Steel, was an Italian bodybuilder and actor.

Born in Rome, Ciani started his career as a stuntman; then he became the body double for Steve Reeves in Hercules Unchained and in The Giant of Marathon, in which he also played a minor role. In the early 1960s he adopted the stage name Alan Steel and starred the leading roles in a number of peplum films with good commercial success. He had the distinction as being one of the very few native Italians to play the heroes of the peplum features. In addition to playing roles named either Hercules, Ursus, or Samson, he played Robin Hood in the 1976 adventure film Storia di arcieri, pugni e occhi neri. With the decline of the genre Steel thinned out his appearances, until his retirement at the end of the 1970s.

Ciani died in his sleep at his house in Ostia, Rome, at age 79, just two days short of what would have been his 80th birthday.

== Partial filmography ==
- Herod the Great (1958) as Palace Guard (uncredited)
- Hercules Unchained (1959) as Megreo
- The Giant of Marathon (1959) as Euros
- Samson (1961) as Macigno aka Hercules
- The Fury of Hercules (1962) as Kaldos
- The Rebel Gladiators (1962) as Commodus
- The Old Testament (1962)
- Samson and the Slave Queen (1963) as Samson (in U.S. version) / Maciste
- Hercules and the Masked Rider (1963) as Golia / Paco / Hercules
- Hercules and the Black Pirates (1964) as Samson
- Hercules Against Rome (1964) as Hercules
- Hercules Against the Moon Men (1964) as Maciste / Hercules
- Hercules and the Treasure of the Incas (1964) as William Smith / Samson
- Samson and His Mighty Challenge (1964) as Hercules
- 3 Avengers (1964) as Ursus
- A... For Assassin (1966) as Giacomo
- Un colpo da re (1967) as The Swede
- Addio mamma (1967) as Franco Rinaldi, Patrizia's husband
- Sapevano solo uccidere (1968) as Pedro
- La furia dei Khyber (1970) as Capitano Miller
- Fasthand (1973) as Cpt. Jeff Madison
- The Little Cowboy (1973) as Monty Donovan
- Dagli archivi della polizia criminale (1973) as Larry Brenton
- Storia di arcieri, pugni e occhi neri (1976) as Robin Hood
- Korkusuz cengaver (1976) as Korsan (uncredited)
- Io tigro, tu tigri, egli tigra (1978)
- Baby Love (1979) (final film role)
