= The Old Testament (film) =

Il vecchio testamento
- Directed by: Gianfranco Parolini
- Written by: Gianfranco Parolini; Giovanni Simonelli; Ghigo De Chiary; Luciano Martino; Giorgio Prosperi
- Starring: See below
- Cinematography: Francesco Izzarelli
- Edited by: Edmond Lozzi
- Music by: Angelo Francesco Lavagnino
- Release date: 1962
- Running time: 115 minutes (Europe); 88 minutes (US)
- Countries: Italy; France

Il vecchio testamento, released in English as The Old Testament, and in Spanish, Los Macabeos (The Maccabees), is a 1962 Italian/French widescreen international co-production epic film shot in Yugoslavia. It is based on the Maccabean Revolt against the Seleucid Empire of Syrian of 167–141 BC. It was directed and co-written by Gianfranco Parolini and starred Brad Harris in one of their frequent collaborations.

== Plot ==
The film is a very loose and free retelling of the Maccabean Revolt. The Greek Syrians demand that Zeus be worshiped in the Temple in Jerusalem. The Jewish priest Mattathias calls for resistance; Mattathias and his followers revolt and flee into the desert. In the wilderness, the Syrian government forces and Mattathias's rebels clash, a battle that claims many lives. Judas Maccabeus, the son of Mattathias, assumes command for a time of them, but he too falls in battle and his brother Jonathan Apphus takes over. After Jonathan's death, his brother Simon Thassi takes his place. Eventually, the Jews under Simon recapture Jerusalem and expel the Syrians. Simon celebrates the victory with his people. A Syrian woman, his bride, stands by his side. In a speech he announces that the captured Syrian soldiers are to be released so that they can report on the power and leniency of the Jews.

A notable difference the film has is that it seemingly portrays the hostile Antiochus IV Epiphanes as more of a local governor than a distant king. The movie also extends his term as villain, as he is around to oppose the Maccabees during the whole movie; in history, he died before Judas did and was replaced by other Syrian kings and commanders. The film also gives romance stories and women a larger role than the rather patriarchal book of 1 Maccabees, which generally kept women in the background and unnamed.

== Cast ==
In the American release several of the cast were credited with surnames of American actors who had appeared in Biblical films such "John (Charlton) Heston" and "Susan (Debra) Paget".

- Brad Harris ... Simon Thassi
- Djordje Nenadovic ... Judas Maccabeus
- Ivano Staccioli ...Antiochus IV Epiphanes
- Franca Parisi ... Miza
- Mara Lane ... Diotima
- Philippe Hersent ... Namele
- Carlo Tamberlani ... Mattathias
- Jacques Berthier ... Apollonius, military commander of Seleucid Empire
- Alan Steel
