= Pipolo =

Pipolo is a surname of Italian origin. Notable people with this surname include:

- Antonio Pipolo (1902–1972), American animator later known as Tom Palmer
- Pietro Pipolo (born 1986), Italian footballer
