= Jolanda Benvenuti =

Italian film editor

- Occupation: Editor
- Years active: 1942–1975

Jolanda Benvenuti was an Italian film editor. She worked on more than a 150 productions during her career, including several films directed by Roberto Rossellini.

== Selected filmography ==
- Laugh, Pagliacci (1943)
- The White Primrose (1947)
- Ring Around the Clock (1950)
- Stromboli (1950)
- The Flowers of St. Francis (1950)
- The Ungrateful Heart (1951)
- Malavita (1951)
- Three Girls from Rome (1952)
- The Piano Tuner Has Arrived (1952)
- The Machine to Kill Bad People (1952)
- Europe '51 (1952)
- Deceit (1952)
- Naples Sings (1953)
- Storms (1953)
- We, the Women (1953)
- It Takes Two to Sin in Love (1954)
- Fear (1954)
- Giovanna d'Arco al rogo (1954)
- Letter from Naples (1954)
- The Island Monster (1954)
- Tragic Ballad (1954)
- Tears of Love (1954)
- Journey to Italy (1954)
- The Courier of Moncenisio (1956)
- The Most Wonderful Moment (1957)
- Adorabili e bugiarde (1958)
- Banditi a Orgosolo (1960)
- Akiko (1961)
- The Brigand (1961)
- Toto's First Night (1962)
- Sexy Toto (1963)
- Sandokan the Great (1963)
- Three Nights of Love (1964)
- Hercules Against Rome (1964)
- Pirates of Malaysia (1964)
- Hercules and the Tyrants of Babylon (1964)
- Ghosts – Italian Style (1967)
- Assault on the State Treasure (1967)
- The Son of Black Eagle (1968)
- Tarzana, the Wild Girl (1969)
- Heads or Tails (1969 film) (1969)
- Tragic Ceremony (1972)

== Bibliography ==
- Bondanella, Peter. The Films of Roberto Rossellini. Cambridge University Press, 1993.
