= Piero Pierotti =

Italian director, screenwriter and journalist (1912–1970)

- Born: 1 January 1912; Pisa, Italy
- Died: 4 May 1970 (aged 58); Rome, Italy
- Other name: Peter E. Stanley
- Occupation: Director

Piero Pierotti (1 January 1912 – 4 May 1970) was an Italian director and screenwriter.

== Life and career ==
Born in Pisa, Pierotti started his career as a journalist, working for La Nazione and Il Nuovo Corriere, and later founding the newspaper Corriere dell'Arno. After some amateur shorts, he moved to Rome where he enrolled in the courses of directing at the Centro Sperimentale di Cinematografia, graduating in 1939. Pierotti later started teaching direction at the University of Pisa, and at the same time he was also active as a documentarist and an assistant director, often collaborating with Raffaello Matarazzo.

Active as a screenwriter since 1955, in the late 1950s he made his directional debut with L'arciere nero and he then directed fifteen films until 1969, being mainly active in the adventure and peplum genres. He was sometimes credited as Peter E. Stanley.

== Selected filmography ==
Director and screenwriter

- The Pirate and the Slave Girl (1959)
- Marco Polo (1961)
- A Queen for Caesar (1962)
- Hercules and the Masked Rider (1963)
- The Avenger of Venice (1964)
- Hercules Against Rome (1964)
- Hercules and the Treasure of the Incas (1964)
- Giant of the Evil Island (1965)
- Assault on the State Treasure (1967)
- Heads or Tails (1969)

Screenwriter

- Street of the Five Moons (1942)
- Guai ai vinti (1954)
- The White Angel (1955)
- The Intruder (1956)
- The Witch's Curse (1962)
- Rome Against Rome (1964)
- Super Seven Calling Cairo (1965)
- The Son of Black Eagle (1968)
