= Tullio Altamura =

Italian actor (1924–2005)

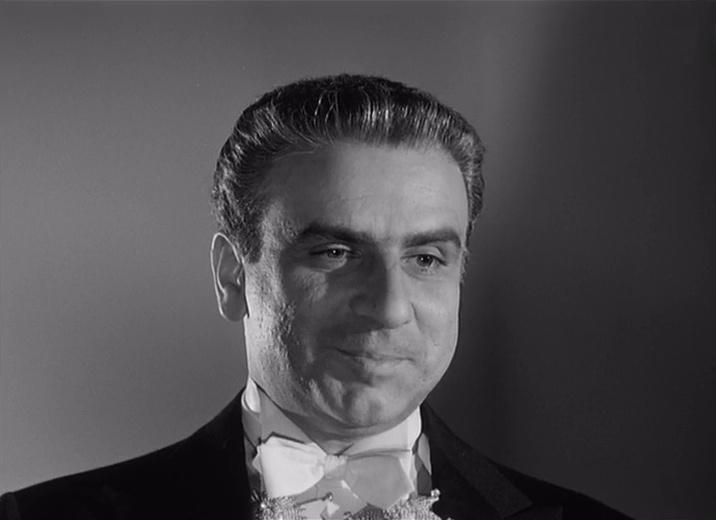
- Altamura in Madri pericolose (1960)
- Born: 18 July 1924; Bologna, Kingdom of Italy
- Died: 6 June 2005 (aged 80)
- Years active: 1954–1989

Tullio Altamura (18 July 1924 – 6 June 2005) was an Italian actor and journalist, best known for his roles in spaghetti Westerns and action films in the 1960s.

== Life and career ==
Born in Bologna, the son of a career officer in the Italian army, Altamura grew up in Rome, where he studied at the liceo classico. After having worked for some time as a freelance journalist, he started his professional acting career in the first half of 1950s. Starting from the 1960s he specialized in villain roles in genre films, in which he often adopted the stage name Tor Altmayer. Active on television from 1957 and on stage from 1961.

Altamura died on 6 June 2005, at the age of 80.

== Filmography ==
- Il cardinale Lambertini, directed by Giorgio Pàstina (1954)
- Il conte Aquila, directed by Guido Salvini (1955)
- L'isola del tesoro, directed by Anton Giulio Majano (1959) - Tv
- Ottocento, directed by Anton Giulio Majano (1959) - Tv
- I figli di Medea, directed by Anton Giulio Majano (1959) - Tv
- Seddok, l'erede di Satana, directed by Anton Giulio Majano (1960)
- Audace colpo dei soliti ignoti, directed by Nanni Loy (1960)
- La lunga notte del '43, directed by Florestano Vancini (1960)
- Labbra rosse, directed by Giuseppe Bennati (1960)
- I tre nemici, directed by Giorgio Simonelli (1962)
- Zorro alla corte di Spagna, directed by Luigi Capuano (1962)
- Ercole contro i tiranni di Babilonia, directed by Domenico Paolella (1964)
- Il colosso di Roma, directed by Giorgio Ferroni (1964)
- Sonaron cuatro balazos, directed by Agustín Navarro (1964)
- Un dollaro bucato, directed by Giorgio Ferroni (1965)
- Rififi ad Amsterdam, directed by Sergio Grieco (1966)
- Assault on the State Treasure, directed by Piero Pierotti (1967)
- Danger!! Death Ray, directed by Gianfranco Baldanello (1967)
- Marinai in coperta, directed by Bruno Corbucci (1967)
- Dick Smart 2.007, directed by Franco Prosperi (1967)
- L'uomo del colpo perfetto, directed by Aldo Florio (1967)
- La morte non ha sesso, directed by Massimo Dallamano (1968)
- Le calde notti di Poppea, directed by Guido Malatesta (1969)
- Diario di un maestro, directed by Vittorio De Seta (1972) - Tv
- Libera, amore mio..., directed by Mauro Bolognini (1973)
- Bachi da seta, directed by Gilberto Visintin (1988)
