= Nello Pazzafini =

Italian actor

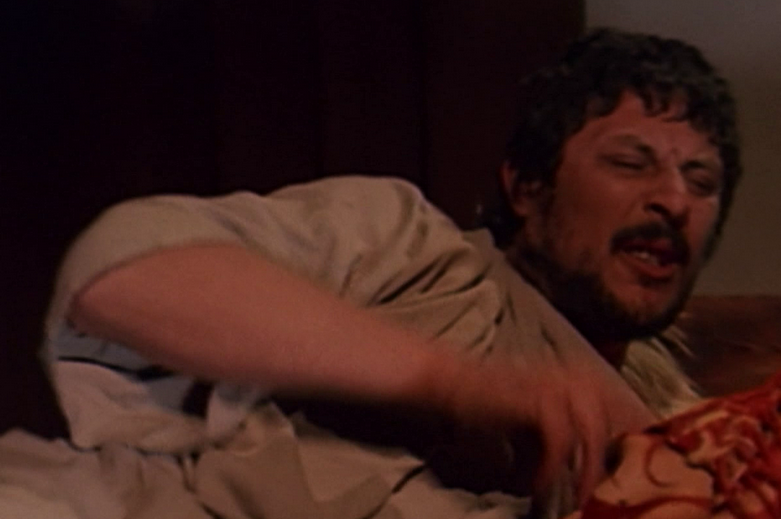
- Pazzafini in Elena sì... ma di Troia (1973)
- Born: Giovanni Pazzafini; 15 May 1933; Rome, Italy
- Died: 9 January 1996 (aged 62); Ostia, Italy
- Occupation: Actor
- Years active: 1958–1992

Giovanni "Nello" Pazzafini (15 May 1933 – 9 January 1996) was an Italian actor who appeared in a very large number of Peplum movies, Spaghetti Westerns and Poliziotteschi.

== Life and career ==
Born in Rome from parents originally from Ferrara, at a young age, Pazzafini was a footballer and in 1958, he attended the first school for stunt men opened in Italy. Initially an often uncredited stunt performer in peplum films, starting from mid-1960s, he gradually got bigger roles, specializing in villain characters.

== Partial filmography ==
- The Trojan Horse (1961)
- The Triumph of Robin Hood (1962)
- Hercules and the Black Pirates (1964)
- 3 Avengers (1964)
- Wanted (1967)
- Seven Pistols for a Massacre (1967)
- Run, Man, Run (1968)
- Bootleggers (1969)
- They Call Him Cemetery (1971)
- The Magnificent Dare Devil (1973)
- Blood and Bullets (1976)
- The Mafia Triangle (1981)
- Banana Joe (1982)
- Double Trouble (1984)
- The Alcove (1985)
