= Angelo Francesco Lavagnino =

Italian composer (1909–1987)

Angelo Francesco Lavagnino (22 February 1909 – 21 August 1987) was an Italian composer, born in Genoa. He is best known for scoring many films, including Legend of the Lost, Conspiracy of Hearts, Gorgo, The Legion's Last Patrol, The Naked Maja, Daisy Miller, and two directed by Orson Welles, Othello and Chimes at Midnight. He also scored several peplums and Spaghetti Westerns.

Lavagnino won the Nastro d'Argento award for Best Score twice, for Continente perduto (1955) and Vertigine bianca (1956).

== Selected filmography ==
- The Devil in the Convent (1950)
- Mamma Mia, What an Impression! (1951)
- Othello (1951)
- The Tired Outlaw (1952)
- Woman of the Red Sea (1953)
- Marriage (1954)
- An American in Rome (1954)
- Toto and Carolina (1955)
- Tom Toms of Mayumba (1955)
- Sins of Casanova (1955)
- Continente perduto (1955)
- The Wanderers (1956)
- Roland the Mighty (1956)
- Count Max (1957)
- Legend of the Lost (1957)
- Engaged to Death (1957)
- The Naked Maja (1958)
- The Wind Cannot Read (1958)
- Passionate Summer (1958)
- The Last Days of Pompeii (1959)
- Nel Segno di Roma (1959)
- Gastone (1960)
- The Warrior Empress (1960)
- Conspiracy of Hearts (1960)
- Messalina (1960)
- Siege of Syracuse (1960)
- Five Branded Women (1960)
- Everybody Go Home (1960)
- Esther and the King (1960)
- Dreams Die at Dawn (1961)
- The Colossus of Rhodes (1961)
- Gorgo (1961)
- Duel of Champions (1961)
- Goliath and the Vampires (1961)
- The Wonders of Aladdin (1961)
- The Corsican Brothers (1961)
- Pontius Pilate (1962)
- Damon and Pythias (1962)
- Ulysses Against the Son of Hercules (1962)
- The Legion's Last Patrol (1962)
- The Old Testament (1962)
- Samson and the Slave Queen (1963)
- Samson and the Sea Beast (1963)
- Hercules, Samson and Ulysses (1963)
- The Mystery of the Indian Temple (1963)
- Hot Enough for June (1964)
- Hercules Against Rome (1964)
- Castle of the Living Dead (1964)
- Hercules and the Tyrants of Babylon (1964)
- The High Bright Sun (1964)
- Hero of Rome (1964)
- Revolt of the Praetorians (1964)
- Gunmen of the Rio Grande (1964)
- Goliath at the Conquest of Damascus (1965)
- Legacy of the Incas (1965)
- Dawn of a New Day (1965)
- Seven Hours of Gunfire (1965)
- Left Handed Johnny West (1965)
- Doc, Hands of Steel (1965)
- Hands of a Gunfighter (1965)
- Agent 077: Mission Bloody Mary (1965)
- The Tramplers (1965)
- 008: Operation Exterminate (1965)
- Wild, Wild Planet (1966)
- War of the Planets (1966)
- God's Own Country (1966)
- Last Man to Kill (1966)
- Chimes at Midnight (1966)
- 4 Dollars of Revenge (1966)
- Assault on the State Treasure (1967)
- A Handful of Heroes (1967)
- Samoa, Queen of the Jungle (1968)
- Trusting Is Good... Shooting Is Better (1968)
- Today We Kill, Tomorrow We Die! (1968)
- The Son of Black Eagle (1968)
- Requiem for a Gringo (1968)
- Revenge for Revenge (1968)
- Battle of the Last Panzer (1969)
- Tarzana, the Wild Girl (1969)
- The Specialist (1969)
- Beatrice Cenci (1969)
- Angeli senza paradiso (1970)
- Zorro in the Court of England (1970)
- The Tigers of Mompracem (1970)
- Something Creeping in The Dark (1971)
- Daisy Miller (1974)
- The Regent's Wife (1975)
