= Fortunato Misiano =

Italian film producer

- Born: 11 October 1899; Messina, Sicily, Kingdom of Italy
- Died: 11 February 1976 (aged 76); Rome, Lazio, Italy
- Occupation: Producer
- Years active: 1940–1969 (film)

Fortunato Misiano (October 11, 1899 – February 11, 1976) was an Italian film producer. In 1946 he founded the Rome-based Romana Film which continued producing films until 1969. The company specialised in turning out films in popular genres during the post-war boom years of Italian cinema.

== Selected filmography ==
- Mist on the Sea (1944)
- Lost in the Dark (1947)
- Baron Carlo Mazza (1948)
- What Price Innocence? (1952)
- The Island Monster (1954)
- Letter from Naples (1954)
- Tears of Love (1954)
- It Takes Two to Sin in Love (1954)
- Mermaid of Naples (1956)
- The Knight of the Black Sword (1956)
- Pirates of the Coast (1960)
- Knight of 100 Faces (1960)
- Sword in the Shadows (1961)
- Queen of the Seas (1961)
- Catherine of Russia (1963)
- The Invincible Masked Rider (1963)
- Assault on the State Treasure (1967)
- Zorro in the Court of England (1968)
- The Son of Black Eagle (1968)

== Bibliography ==
- Marlow-Mann, Alex. The New Neapolitan Cinema. Edinburgh University Press, 2011.
