= Augusto Tiezzi =

Italian cinematographer (1910–1990)

- Born: 16 April 1910; Castagneto Carducci, Kingdom of Italy
- Died: 19 October 1990 (aged 80); Rome, Italy
- Occupation: Cinematographer
- Years active: 1935–1970

Augusto Tiezzi (1910–1990) was an Italian cinematographer who worked on more than 70 films during his career including Hercules and the Masked Rider (1963).

== Selected filmography ==
- Villafranca (1934)
- Hundred Days (1935)
- The Two Sergeants (1936)
- White Amazons (1936)
- No Man's Land (1939)
- The Sin of Rogelia Sanchez (1940)
- Saint Rogelia (1940)
- Guilt Is Not Mine (1952)
- What Price Innocence? (1952)
- It Takes Two to Sin in Love (1954)
- Barrier of the Law (1954)
- The Island Monster (1954)
- Tears of Love (1954)
- The Knight of the Black Sword (1956)
- Serenata a Maria (1957)
- Attack of the Moors (1959)
- Queen of the Seas (1961)
- Hercules and the Masked Rider (1963)
- Assault on the State Treasure (1967)
- The Son of Black Eagle (1968)

== Bibliography ==
- Klossner, Michael. The Europe of 1500-1815 on film and television. McFarland & Co, 2002.
