= List of Italian films of 1952 =

A list of films produced in Italy in 1952 (see 1952 in film):

== A-F ==
Title	Director	Cast	Genre	Notes
Abracadabra	Max Neufeld	Mario Riva, Riccardo Billi, Lilia Landi	Comedy	
Adorable Creatures	Christian-Jaque	Daniel Gélin, Antonella Lualdi, Danielle Darrieux	Romantic comedy	Co-production with France
The Adventures of Mandrin	Mario Soldati	Raf Vallone, Silvana Pampanini, Jacques Castelot	Adventure	Co-production with France
The Angel of Sin	Leonardo De Mitri	Roldano Lupi, Gaby André, Luigi Tosi	Drama	
The Angels of the District	Carlo Borghesio	Rossana Podestà, Jacques Sernas, Marisa Merlini	Drama	
Article 519, Penal Code	Leonardo Cortese	Henri Vidal, Cosetta Greco, Paolo Stoppa	Drama	Co-production with France
At Sword's Edge	Carlo Ludovico Bragaglia	Frank Latimore, Milly Vitale, Doris Duranti	Adventure	
The Bandit of Tacca Del Lupo	Pietro Germi	Amedeo Nazzari, Cosetta Greco, Fausto Tozzi	Historical	
Beauties of the Night	René Clair	Gérard Philipe, Martine Carol, Gina Lollobrigida	Fantasy	Co-production with France
Beauties on Motor Scooters	Carlo Campogalliani	Isa Barzizza, Virginia Belmont, Fulvia Franco	Comedy	
Black Feathers	Oreste Biancoli	Marcello Mastroianni, Marina Vlady, Camillo Pilotto	War	
The Black Mask	Filippo Walter Ratti	Cesare Danova, Franca Marzi, Nino Pavese	Adventure	
The Blind Woman of Sorrento	Giacomo Gentilomo	Antonella Lualdi, Paul Campbell, Marilyn Buferd	Drama	
Brothers of Italy	Fausto Saraceni	Ettore Manni, Paul Muller, Olga Solbelli	War	
Carne inquieta	Silvestro Prestifilippo	Raf Vallone, Marina Berti, Clara Calamai	Drama	
Cats and Dogs	Leonardo De Mitri	Titina De Filippo, Umberto Spadaro, Antonella Lualdi	Comedy	
The City Stands Trial	Luigi Zampa	Amedeo Nazzari, Silvana Pampanini, Paolo Stoppa,	Drama	Entered into the Berlin Film Festival, Nastro d'Argento best director.
La Colpa di una madre	Carlo Duse	Marina Berti, Folco Lulli, Marcella Rovena	Drama	
Deceit	Guido Brignone	Gabriele Ferzetti, Nadia Gray, Tina Lattanzi	Melodrama	
Delitto al luna park	Renato Polselli	Franca Marzi, Renato Baldini, Nico Pepe	Drama	
Don Lorenzo	Carlo Ludovico Bragaglia	Rossana Podestà, Luciano Taioli, Franco Interlenghi	Musical	
Drama on the Tiber	Tanio Boccia	Renato Baldini, Aldo Fiorelli, Bianca Doria	Drama	
The Dream of Zorro	Mario Soldati	Walter Chiari, Delia Scala, Vittorio Gassman	Comedy adventure	
The Enemy	Giorgio Bianchi	Elisa Cegani, Frank Latimore, Vira Silenti	Melodrama	
Er fattaccio	Riccardo Moschino	Marisa Merlini, Luisa Rossi, Otello Toso	Drama	
Ergastolo	Luigi Capuano	Franco Interlenghi, Sandro Ruffini, Marisa Merlini	Prison drama	
The Eternal Chain	Anton Giulio Majano	Marcello Mastroianni, Gianna Maria Canale, Leda Gloria	Melodrama	
Europa '51	Roberto Rossellini	Ingrid Bergman, Alexander Knox, Giulietta Masina	Italian neorealism	
The Eyes Leave a Trace	José Luis Sáenz de Heredia	Raf Vallone, Elena Varzi, Emma Penella	Thriller	Co-production with Spain
Falsehood	Ubaldo Maria Del Colle	Yvonne Sanson, Irène Galter, Alberto Farnese	Melodrama	
Fanfan la Tulipe	Christian-Jaque	Gérard Philipe, Gina Lollobrigida, Marcel Herrand	Swashbuckler	Co-production with France
La Favorita	Cesare Barlacchi	Gino Sinimberghi, Sophia Loren, Franca Tamantini	Drama	
I Figli non si vendono	Mario Bonnard	Lea Padovani, Jacques Sernas, Paola Barbara	Melodrama	
La Figlia del diavolo	Primo Zeglio	Massimo Serato, Paola Barbara, Marina Vlady	Historical	Co-production with France
Final Pardon	Renato Polselli	John Kitzmiller, Franca Marzi, Adriano Rimoldi	Drama	
The Firebird	Hasse Ekman	Tito Gobbi, Eva Henning, Georg Rydeberg	Musical drama	Co-production with Sweden
Five Paupers in an Automobile	Mario Mattoli	Eduardo De Filippo, Aldo Fabrizi, Isa Barzizza	Comedy	
The Flame	Alessandro Blasetti	Amedeo Nazzari, Eleonora Rossi Drago, Elisa Cegani	Historical	
Frontier Wolf	Edoardo Anton	Piero Lulli, Maria Frau, Tamara Lees	Adventure	

== G-N ==
Title	Director	Cast	Genre	Notes
Genoese Dragnet	Guido Brignone	Lianella Carell, Cesare Danova, Marcello Giorda	Crime drama	
Giovinezza	Giorgio Pastina	Delia Scala, Franco Interlenghi, Hélène Rémy	Comedy	
Girls Marked Danger	Luigi Comencini	Eleonora Rossi Drago, Marc Lawrence, Silvana Pampanini	Crime	
The Golden Coach	Jean Renoir	Anna Magnani, Odoardo Spadaro, Duncan Lamont	Comedy	Co-production with France
Guilt Is Not Mine	Giuseppe Masini	Rossano Brazzi, Gaby Andre, Elvy Lissiak	Melodrama	
Ha da venì... don Calogero!	Vittorio Vassarotti	Barry Fitzgerald, Lauro Gazzolo, Lois Maxwell	Comedy	
Half a Century of Song	Domenico Paolella	Marco Vicario, Cosetta Greco, Silvana Pampanini	Comedy	
Hello Elephant	Gianni Franciolini	Vittorio De Sica, María Mercader, Sabu	Comedy	
Heroic Charge	Francesco De Robertis	Tania Weber, Franco Fabrizi, Domenico Modugno	War	
Husband and Wife	Eduardo De Filippo	Eduardo De Filippo, Titina De Filippo, Tina Pica	Comedy	
I, Hamlet	Giorgio Simonelli	Erminio Macario, Franca Marzi, Rossana Podestà	Comedy	
I'm the Hero	Carlo Ludovico Bragaglia	Renato Rascel, Delia Scala, Andrea Checchi	Comedy	
Immortal Melodies	Giacomo Gentilomo	Pierre Cressoy, Carla Del Poggio, Vera Molnar	Musical	
In Olden Days	Alessandro Blasetti	Aldo Fabrizi, Amedeo Nazzari, Gina Lollobrigida	Comedy drama	
Leathernose	Yves Allégret	Jean Marais, Françoise Christophe, Mariella Lotti	Historical	Co-production with France
The Legend of the Piave	Riccardo Freda	Gianna Maria Canale, Carlo Giustini, Renato Baldini	War	
Lieutenant Giorgio	Raffaello Matarazzo	Massimo Girotti, Milly Vitale, Paul Muller	Romance	
Little World of Don Camillo	Julien Duvivier	Fernandel, Gino Cervi	Comedy	
The Machine to Kill Bad People	Roberto Rossellini	Marilyn Buferd, Clara Bindi, William Tubbs	Fantasy comedy	
The Mad Marechiaro	Roberto Roberti	Aldo Silvani, Diana Dei, Tatiana Farnese	Drama	
Mademoiselle Gobete	Pietro Germi	Silvana Pampanini, Aroldo Tieri, Luigi Pavese	Comedy	
The Man in My Life	Guy Lefranc	Madeleine Robinson, Jeanne Moreau, Walter Santesso	Drama	Co-Production with France
Melody of Love	Mario Costa	Nadia Gray, Maria Fiore, Giacomo Rondinella	Musical drama	
Milady and the Musketeers	Vittorio Cottafavi	Rossano Brazzi, Yvette Lebon, Massimo Serato	Adventure	Co-production with France
The Mistress of Treves	Arthur Maria Rabenalt	Rossano Brazzi, Anne Vernon, Enzo Fiermonte	Historical	Co-production with France
The Moment of Truth	Jean Delannoy	Michèle Morgan, Jean Gabin, Walter Chiari	Drama	Co-production with France
I Morti non pagano tasse	Sergio Grieco	Tino Scotti, Titina De Filippo, Carlo Campanini	Comedy	
A Mother Returns	Roberto Bianchi Montero	Linda Sini, Gianni Rizzo, Ermanno Randi	Drama	
The Mute of Portici	Giorgio Ansoldi	Doris Duranti, Paolo Carlini, Umberto Sacripante	Drama	
Nessuno ha tradito	Roberto Bianchi Montero	Virginia Belmont, Aldo Silvani, Roberto Risso	Melodrama	
Non ho paura di vivere	Fabrizio Taglioni	Franca Marzi, Renato Baldini, Carlo Ninchi	Drama	
Non è vero... ma ci credo	Sergio Grieco	Peppino De Filippo, Titina De Filippo, Guglielmo Inglese	Comedy	

== O-Z ==
Title	Director	Cast	Genre	Notes
One Hundred Little Mothers	Giulio Morelli	William Tubbs, Lia Amanda, Clelia Matania	Drama	
The Overcoat	Alberto Lattuada	Renato Rascel, Yvonne Sanson, Antonella Lualdi	Drama	Close to Italian neorealism.
Papà diventa mamma	Aldo Fabrizi	Aldo Fabrizi, Ave Ninchi, Giovanna Ralli	Comedy	
Papà ti ricordo	Mario Volpe	Paolo Carlini, Lea Padovani, Irene Genna	Melodrama	
The Passaguai Family Gets Rich	Aldo Fabrizi	Aldo Fabrizi, Erminio Macario, Ave Ninchi	Comedy	
La Peccatrice dell'isola	Sergio Corbucci, Sergio Grieco	Silvana Pampanini, Folco Lulli, Vittorio Duse	Melodrama	
The Phantom Musketeer	Max Calandri	Tamara Lees, Rossana Podestà, Clara Calamai	Adventure	
The Piano Tuner Has Arrived	Duilio Coletti	Nino Taranto, Alberto Sordi, Tamara Lees	Comedy	
Poppy	Vittorio Metz; Marcello Marchesi	Walter Chiari, Anna Maria Ferrero, Carlo Campanini	Comedy	
Primo premio Mariarosa	Sergio Grieco	Carlo Croccolo, Isa Barzizza, Carlo Campanini	Comedy	
Prisoners of Darkness	Enrico Bomba	Milly Vitale, Folco Lulli, Eduardo Ciannelli	Melodrama	
The Queen of Sheba	Pietro Francisci	Leonora Ruffo, Gino Cervi, Marina Berti	Adventure	
Ragazze da marito	Eduardo De Filippo	Eduardo De Filippo, Peppino De Filippo, Lianella Carell	Comedy	
Red Love	Aldo Vergano	Marina Berti, Massimo Serato, Guido Celano	Drama	
Red Shirts	Goffredo Alessandrini; Francesco Rosi	Anna Magnani, Raf Vallone, Jacques Sernas	Historical	Co-production with France
Redemption	Piero Caserini	Luisa Rossi, Marco Vicario, Juan de Landa	Drama	
Repentance	Mario Costa	Cesare Danova, Paul Muller, Doris Duranti	Drama	Co-production with Spain
Rimorso	Armando Grottini	Maria Grazia Francia, Otello Toso, Linda Sini	Melodrama	
Il Romanzo della mia vita	Lionello De Felice	Luciano Tajoli, Antonella Lualdi, Fulvia Franco	Drama	
Rome 11 o'clock	Giuseppe De Santis	Carla Del Poggio, Massimo Girotti, Lucia Bosé, Raf Vallone	Italian neorealism	Augusto Genina made Tre storie proibite based on the real tragic accident the film is based
Rosalba, la fanciulla di Pompei	Natale Montillo	Roberto Risso, Elli Parvo, Renato Baldini	Melodrama	
Sardinian Vendetta	Mario Mattoli	Walter Chiari, Mario Riva, Giovanna Pala	Comedy	
The Secret of Three Points	Carlo Ludovico Bragaglia	Massimo Girotti, Tamara Lees, Umberto Spadaro	Adventure	
Sensuality	Clemente Fracassi	Marcello Mastroianni, Amedeo Nazzari, Eleonora Rossi Drago	Melodrama	
Serenata amara	Pino Mercanti	Claudio Villa, Giovanna Pala, Liliana Bonfatti	Melodrama	
Shadows Over Trieste	Nerino Florio Bianchi	Giulio Donnini, Livio Lorenzon, Adriana Innocenti	War	
Solo per te Lucia	Franco Rossi	Mariella Lotti, Luigi Tosi, Nerio Bernardi	Comedy	
Son of the Hunchback	Fernando Cerchio	Rossano Brazzi, Milly Vitale, Gabrielle Dorziat	Adventure	Co-production with France
La Storia del fornaretto di Venezia	Giacinto Solito	Doris Duranti, Mariella Lotti, Paolo Carlini	Historical	
Stranger on the Prowl	Joseph Losey	Paul Muni, Joan Lorring, Luisa Rossi	Drama	
Sul ponte dei sospiri	Antonio Leonviola	Frank Latimore, Maria Frau, Massimo Girotti	Adventure	
Sunday Heroes	Mario Camerini	Raf Vallone, Marcello Mastroianni, Cosetta Greco	Sports	
Il tallone di Achille	Mario Amendola; Ruggero Maccari	Tino Scotti, Tamara Lees, Paolo Stoppa	Comedy	
They Were Three Hundred	Gian Paolo Callegari	Rossano Brazzi, Franca Marzi, Myriam Bru	Historical	
A Thief in Paradise	Domenico Paolella	Nino Taranto, Francesco Golisano, Hélène Rémy	Comedy	
Three Forbidden Stories	Augusto Genina	Lia Amanda, Antonella Lualdi, Isa Pola	Drama	
Three Girls from Rome	Luciano Emmer	Lucia Bosé, Cosetta Greco, Marcello Mastroianni	Comedy	
The Three Pirates	Mario Soldati	Ettore Manni, Marc Lawrence, Barbara Florian	Adventure	
The Tired Outlaw	Fernando Cerchio	Renato Rascel, Lauretta Masiero, Lia Di Leo	Comedy	
Torment of the Past	Mario Bonnard	Helene Remy, Marc Lawrence, Carla Del Poggio	Melodrama	
Toto and the King of Rome	Mario Monicelli	Totò, Giovanna Pala, Alberto Sordi	Comedy	
Toto and the Women	Mario Monicelli, Stefano Vanzina	Totò, Lea Padovani, Franca Faldini	Comedy	
Toto in Color	Stefano Vanzina	Totò, Franca Valeri, Rosita Pisano	Comedy	1st Italian film in color
Tragic Return	Pier Luigi Faraldo	Doris Duranti, Marcello Mastroianni, Franca Marzi	Drama	
Two Cents Worth of Hope	Renato Castellani	Maria Fiore, Vincenzo Musolino, Gina Mascetti	Pink neorealism	Palme d'Or winner
Umberto D.	Vittorio De Sica	Carlo Battisti, Maria-Pia Casilio, Lina Gennari	Italian neorealism	New York Film Critics Circle Awards won. Academy Award nominee best script
Verginità	Leonardo De Mitri	Irene Genna, Leonardo Cortese, Franca Marzi	Melodrama	
Viva il cinema!	Enzo Trapani	Delia Scala, Fiorenzo Fiorentini, Marilyn Buferd	Comedy	
La Voce del sangue	Pino Mercanti	Paul Muller, Franca Marzi, Evi Maltagliati	Melodrama	
Wanda the Sinner	Duilio Coletti	Yvonne Sanson, Frank Villard, Françoise Rosay	Melodrama	Co-production with France
We Are All Murderers	André Cayatte	Amedeo Nazzari, Yvonne Sanson, Raymond Pellegrin	Crime	Co-Production with France
We Two Alone	Marcello Marchesi, Vittorio Metz	Walter Chiari, Helene Remy, Carlo Campanini	Comedy	
We're Dancing on the Rainbow	Carmine Gallone, Arthur Maria Rabenalt	Inge Egger, Isa Barzizza, Karl Schönböck	Musical	Co-production with West Germany
What Price Innocence?	Luigi Capuano	Lida Baarova, Otello Toso, Mariella Lotti	Melodrama	
The White Sheik	Federico Fellini	Brunella Bovo, Leopoldo Trieste, Alberto Sordi, Giulietta Masina	Comedy drama	
Who Is Without Sin	Raffaello Matarazzo	Yvonne Sanson, Amedeo Nazzari, Françoise Rosay	Melodrama	
Wife For a Night	Mario Camerini	Gina Lollobrigida, Gino Cervi, Nadia Gray	Comedy	
Wolves Hunt at Night	Bernard Borderie	Jean-Pierre Aumont, Carla Del Poggio, Fernand Ledoux	Spy	Co-production with France
A Woman Has Killed	Vittorio Cottafavi	Frank Latimore, Lianella Carell, Umberto Spadaro	Melodrama	
The Woman Who Invented Love	Ferruccio Cerio	Silvana Pampanini, Rossano Brazzi, Mariella Lotti	Drama	
The Wonderful Adventures of Guerrin Meschino	Pietro Francisci	Gino Leurini, Leonora Ruffo, Tamara Lees	Adventure	

== Documentaries and Shorts ==
Title	Director	Cast	Genre	Notes
Campane di Pompeii	Giuseppe Lombardi			
Cavalcata di mezzo secolo	Luciano Emmer		Documentary	
Epeira Diadema	Alberto Ancilotto		Documentary	Nominated for an Academy Award
Gamba di legno				
Leonardo da Vinci	Luciano Emmer, Lauro Venturi			
Meglio di ieri	Romolo Marcellini		Documentary	
Il Mercato delle facce	Valerio Zurlini	Franco Zeffirelli, Giuseppe La Torre		
Pinne e arpioni	Folco Quilici		Documentary	
La Stazione	Valerio Zurlini		Documentary	
Gli undici moschettieri	Ennio De Concini; Fausto Saraceni		Documentary	
Piccolo cabotaggio pittorico				
Il Richiamo del ghiacciaio				
Salviamo la montagna muore				
La Trappola di fuoco				
Tutto il mondo ride	Ignazio Ferronetti		Comedy anthology	
Una Croce senza nome	Tullio Covaz	Carlo Ninchi		
