= La Stazione =

La Stazione may refer to:

- La stazione (1952 film), a documentary by Valerio Zurlini
- La stazione, or The Station (1990 film), an Italian comedy-drama by Sergio Rubini
- New Paltz station, New York, a former railroad station occupied by a restaurant formerly known as La Stazione
