= Little Monsters (TV series) =

1998 British children's television show

- Genre: Children's series Animated series
- Developed by: Russell Neale Dever
- Written by: Jimmy Hibbert
- Directed by: Tony Garth
- Voices of: David Holt; Janet James; Jill Shilling; Melissa Sinden
- Theme music composer: Gary Osborne; Poli Palmer
- Country of origin: United Kingdom
- Original language: English
- No. of episodes: 52

Production
- Editors: Lincoln Anderson; Helen; Kenny Mark Wharton
- Running time: 5 minutes

Original release
- Network: CBBC; BBC Children's and Education
- Release: 14 September – 31 December 1998

Little Monsters is a British animated children's television show that ran from 1998 on CBBC in the United Kingdom. The show was based on the books of the same name by Tony Garth, focusing on eccentric and mischievous children.

== Telecast and home media ==
First introduced in 1998, the five-minute episodes of Little Monsters were co-produced by Ealing Studios and CBBC. Little Monsters was also translated into Scottish Gaelic, known as: Na Bleigeardan. In France, it was aired on TF1, under the French title: Petites Crapules, in Germany on Super RTL as: Die kleinen Monster, in Greece and in Cyprus as: Μικρά τερατάκια, in Italy on RAI2 and RAI1 as: Adorabili Pesti, in the Middle East on Spacetoon as: المتعبون الصغار, in the Netherlands as: Kleine Monsters and in Portugal on TVI as: Os Traquinas.

In 2010, the programme was also aired in Spain (Los mini monstruos), South Africa, Israel (מפלצות קטנות), the Middle East (المتعبون الصغار), Singapore, China, South Korea, Japan (リトルモンスター), Latin Europe and Latin America (Los mini monstruos in Spanish and Os Traquinas in Portuguese). The Gaelic version originally aired on BBC One Scotland from 5 January 2001 to 2 April 2001, repeated from September to November 2001 on Tuesdays, Wednesdays and Thursdays. It then aired on BBC Two Scotland and BBC Alba. The rights to the series are still owned, and controlled by Russell Neale Dever, in collaboration with Ian Harding. The distribution rights are controlled by Foothill Entertainment.

In the early 2000s, Video Collection International released videotapes and DVDs of the show.

In the year of 2009, US distributor Mill Creek Entertainment released the show on DVD.

== Characters ==
All of the characters are spoiled little children:

- Boisterous Billy (voiced by Jill Shilling) He is a hyperactive little boy, who is always filled with energy, and is very easily excited. He is always wanting to have fun, even when it's not the right time and place to do it.
- Bossy Bethany (voiced by Janet James) She is a bossy, yet very independent, strong-witted, little red-haired girl, always telling others what to do. Bethany is always bossing other people around, by telling them what they are doing wrong and telling them to do it right, or by telling them what to do. Sometimes, her bossiness can get the better of her.
- Curious Calvin (voiced by Jill Shilling) He is a little Black English boy, who is always willing to know anything and everything. He is always asking himself questions about everything, why they are the case.
- Clumsy Clarissa (voiced by Janet James) – She is a clumsy, yet well-meaning, little girl, but she cannot help but have all kinds of accidents, whether she falls over, or knocks things over, often causing them to break.
- Contrary Constance (voiced by Janet James) She is a posh, quick-witted, contrary little girl. Constance dislikes being told what to do. She will either flat-out refuse to do as she is told, or she'll do the exact opposite of what she is told to do. Like, whenever she's told to read quietly, she is read out loud, and when she's told to do her homework, she refuses to do it.
- Dangerous Dave (voiced by Jill Shilling) He is a daring little boy. He is a daredevil, willing to do anything that is dangerous. Dave is always willing to do dangerous things, like climbing the highest trees, walking tightropes, and even diving.
- Dirty Dermot (voiced by Jill Shilling) He is a grubby, Bristol-accented little boy who has a filthy habit of getting himself dirty. Dermot cannot help but get himself dirty all the time. He always says, "These things happen".
- Forgetful Fiona (voiced by Janet James) She is a quiet, shy, yet sweet little girl with a notoriously forgetful mind. Fiona suffers from short-term memory loss. She will even go as far as to try and remember that particular thing she had forgotten.
- Friendly Franco (voiced by Jill Shilling) He is a Spaniard boy who is always on his best behaviour, and is quite possibly the kindest boy in the world. Franco is always kind to everyone, and always does his best to make friends with anyone. He is always willing to cheer up people who are upset or worried.
- Greedy Graham (voiced by Jill Shilling) He is a fat little boy with an eating disorder. Graham is always hungry. He is always craving for different kinds of food, even to the point of eating excess amounts. He is prone to getting a stomach-ache by doing so.
- Grown-Up Gabby (voiced by Janet James) She is a big girl in curls she is really an adult. Gabby is willing to act as grown-up as possible, like putting on makeup (as shown in her book), wearing her mum's attire (like her mum's hat, dress and high heels), and even disapproving of things she claims are childish.
- Helpful Henry (voiced by Jill Shilling) He is a good little boy. Henry is always eager to help other people, even if they do not need help. Henry is always eager to help other people, even if they do not need help. Sometimes, Henry's "helping" can lead to trouble.
- Irritating Irving (voiced by Jill Shilling) He is an annoying little boy in an aviator's costume with a posh accent. Irving is always bored. So bored, he will go as far as to doing something that will annoy everyone around him.
- Know-All Nancy (voiced by Janet James) She is a little girl who claims she has infinity knowledge. Nancy claims she knows everything. She will go as far as to try convincing everyone that what she thinks is the case, even if it is not. She is often heard saying, "I knew that!", and "I know how (said thing is done)!".
- Perfect Prudence (voiced by Janet James) She is a dark-haired little Irish girl with a very bad case of OCD, who can be rather rude to people who do not get something right enough for her liking. Prudence is very picky and wants everything to be right enough for her liking, especially her appearance. Every time it is to her liking, she will declare it "perfect".
- Pickin' Peter (voiced by Jill Shilling) He is a little boy with a filthy habit of picking his nose, much to his mum's dismay. He always does his best to pick his nose whenever his mum is not looking, so to avoid certain punishments for doing so. As shown in his title card, he also has a bad habit of picking his ears.
- Revolting Ronnie (voiced by Jill Shilling) He is a disgusting little boy. Ronnie has a filthy habit of collecting maggots, slugs, worms, and any animal anyone would consider disgusting. He will even do disgusting things, like disgusting artwork when out of nice clean paints.
- Rude Roger (voiced by Jill Shilling) He is an impolite little boy. Roger has horrible manners, and is always saying impolite things. He will often blow raspberry, say ugly names, chew with his mouth open, and burp without covering his mouth.
- Serious Sadie (voiced by Janet James) She is a serious Black English girl. Sadie has trouble with figuring out how to have fun, and wants to be as serious as can be, by reading and studying. Her parents are the exact opposite.
- Shy Sophie (voiced by Janet James) She is a timid little girl. She gets very uncomfortable with being in the company of others, and she will often shy away, even saying, "I'm shy...". She is half-Chinese.
- Sickly Simon (voiced by Jill Shilling) He is a little boy who is always feeling poorly, or at least he thinks he feels poorly. Every time he gets a doctor's visit, the doctor tells him to get out more, showing that Simon is healthier than he thinks he is.
- Silly Sydney (voiced by Jill Shilling) He is a very silly little boy. Sydney is always doing things that lack common sense. He always acts silly, talks silly, and even dresses silly, usually wearing his underpants on his head, and flippers instead of shoes. He always does meaningless things, and even says meaningless things, like saying, "Happy Christmas!" when it is not Christmas, and even talking topsy-turvy. However, despite being very odd and wacky, he is not mean – he is really nice, and even brave, when the need arises.
- Sulky Sue (voiced by Janet James) She is a little girl with a problem with being miserable and unhappy most of the time, hence her nickname. Sue is always acting miserable. Even the funniest, most exciting, and most entertaining things cannot cheer her up, and she often mumbles that she hates the thing she's about to do, even going as far as calling them "Stupid". Her parents are the exact opposite.
- Tantrum Tabitha (voiced by Janet James) She is a naughty, little blonde girl who always throws a tantrum. Tabitha has a terrible habit of causing a scene. Whenever things do not go her way, Tabitha will always throw a tantrum especially when it comes to stuff she hates, whether it be going on public transport, going shopping, or having to wear a bobble hat.
- Tell-Tale Tallulah (voiced by Janet James) She is a Black Scottish girl, who is rather infamous around her school for telling lies and spreading gossip. Tallulah is always spreading gossip and rumours, often to keep herself out of trouble. Sometimes, she is told she should not be spreading rumours so often.
- Ticklish Timmy (voiced by Jill Shilling) He is a ticklish little boy. Timmy has skin that is so sensitive, everything that touches him tickles, causing him to laugh uncontrollably. Trying to tie his shoelaces tickles, tucking him into bed tickles, even a tickle-proof suit tickles.
- Too-Late Toby (voiced by Jill Shilling) He is a Black English boy who is always late. Toby is always late for everything. He takes too long to do everything, and he will end up being late for important things. Sometimes, his "lateness" can result in him being too early.
- TV Trevor (voiced by Jill Shilling) He is a little boy who has a habit of pretending to be the main character of every show he sees on television. Trevor always finds himself watching television, and when he is done with the show, he pretends to be the main character. When it comes to watching imported shows, he will put on a US accent. Trevor does not like when his parents threaten to take away the television.
- Wide-Awake Wesley (voiced by Jill Shilling) He is a Black English boy who is not going to sleep. Wesley has a bad habit of staying awake all night, and will do anything to avoid going to sleep, even when it is time for him to do so.
- Worried Winnie (voiced by Janet James) She is a little girl who worries about everything, especially about what is going to happen to her or the entire world. She worries about these things so much, she tries her best to do something about it, even if they are not really something to worry about.

== Episodes ==
There are 52 episodes altogether:

Series 1

1. "Mahogany Gorilla Pelmets" (airdate: 1998)
2. "Help!" (airdate: 1998)
3. "A Place For Everything" (airdate: 1998)
4. "Young at Heart" (airdate: 1998)
5. "Dave's Big Top Adventure" (1998): Dave has a circus adventure.
6. "Grime and Punishment" (airdate: 1998)
7. "A Very Serious Business" (airdate: 1998)
8. "Whoops-A-Daisy" (airdate: 1998)
9. "Worried Silly" (airdate: 1998)
10. "Hey! Turnip Nose" (airdate: 1998)
11. "A Perfect Way" (airdate: 1998)
12. "Earwax Pie" (airdate: 1998)
13. "Crash! Bang! Wallop!" (airdate: 1998)

Series 2

1. "Shan't, Can't, Won't" (5 October 1998): Contrary Constance is disobedient.
2. "Forget-Me-Not" (airdate: 1998)
3. "Whose Birthday is it Anyway?" (airdate: 1998)
4. "Do Tell" (airdate: 1998)
5. "The Broom Cupboard" (airdate: 1998)
6. "Too Much for Me Please" (airdate: 1998)
7. "On Your Nerves" (airdate: 1998)
8. "The Two Amigos" (airdate: 1998)
9. "Cognito" (airdate: 1998)
10. "Growing Paints" (airdate: 1998)
11. "Terrapins Don't Wear Plaid" (airdate: 1998)
12. "Slugs, Snails and Puppy Dogs Tails" (airdate: 1998)
13. "An Ill Wind" (5 December 2001): Simon thinks he has a disease.

Series 3

1. "When? Why? What? Where?" (airdate: 1998)
2. "Tickled Pink" (airdate: 1998)
3. "Food for Thought" (12 October 1998): Greedy Graham eats too much.
4. "Christmas is Cancelled" (airdate: 1998)
5. "No Publicity" (1998): Sophie runs shy of publicity.
6. "Monday Morning Fever" (13 January 1999): Sickly Simon has a fever.
7. "Scream the Impossible Scream" (airdate: 1998)
8. "Monkey Business" (airdate: 1998)
9. "Sulking is Such Sweet Sorrow" (airdate: 1998)
10. "Let's Have a Bawl" (airdate: 1998)
11. "ZZZZZZ" (1 October 2000): Wesley's dad takes him on a camping trip.
12. "Worry Wort" (airdate: 1998)
13. "No Laughing Matter" (airdate: 1998)

Series 4

1. "The Chinese Whisper" (airdate: 1998)
2. "Can't Stop Now" (16 May 1999): Boisterous Billy is up to no good.
3. "Attack of the Giggles" (airdate: 1998)
4. "Nancy and the Dinosaurs" (airdate: 1998)
5. "The Big Sulk" (airdate: 1998)
6. "A Little Knowledge is a Dangerous Thing" (airdate: 1998)
7. "Never Too Late" (airdate: 1998)
8. "Prime Time" (airdate: 1998)
9. "Late Again" (airdate: 1998)
10. "Pick 'n Mix" (airdate: 1998)
11. "Do It Now" (airdate: 1998)
12. "The Big Flick" (airdate: 1998)
13. "A Start This Cartoon Now!" (airdate: 1998)
