= Eurocops =

Multinational television series

- Starring: Heiner Lauterbach
- Country of origin: Germany
- No. of seasons: 6
- No. of episodes: 70

Production
- Running time: 60 minutes

Original release
- Network: ZDF
- Release: 6 November 1988 – 1993

Eurocops is a European television crime TV-series produced between 1988 and 1992. It is a co-production between seven European TV stations in which each station produced a number of episodes which were then pooled, dubbed and otherwise adapted when needed and broadcast by all participating stations, a format used earlier in the German crime series Tatort. The participating networks were ZDF from Germany, ORF from Austria, SRG from Switzerland, RAI from Italy, Televisión Española from Spain, Antenne 2 from France and Channel 4 from the United Kingdom.

A direct consequence of the 'pooled production' format was that all episodes by one particular network had a strong local or national feel and were distinctly different from the episodes produced by other networks. Not only were they filmed in the network's own country with local actors, but they were also written by local screenwriters, thus reflecting that nation's specific taste for crime dramas. With national networks at that time still relying on self-produced programs, a big part of Eurocops' allure was that it offered viewers in one country a first-hand look at what crime series in other countries looked like.

Despite being a pan-European TV series, the three German speaking networks did more than half of the filming with Germany and Austria filming 15 episodes on their own and one more joint production. Switzerland contributed another 12. Of the four non-German speaking countries, Italy made 13 episodes and France made 8, whereas Spain and the UK made only 4 and 3 episodes respectively.

All in all, in a span of five and a half years, seventy-one episodes were produced. Typically they were broadcast once a month. In Germany, ZDF broadcast the series on every fourth Friday as part of its Friday night crime lineup. (The three other Fridays it would broadcast episodes from other homemade crime series). Its first broadcast was on November 6, 1988, with a Swiss production called "Tote reisen nicht" (English: The dead don't travel).

== Introduction and title music ==
The title sequence is an electronic theme composed by Jan Hammer in which a camera circles over a map of Europe, showing the different cities in which the episodes take place accompanied by a picture and name of the local detective. Finally the camera zooms out into a picture of the police badge of the country for that episode. Still a novelty for this time, the title was completely computer generated.

== Cast and crew ==
=== Germany ===
- Produced by: Monaco Film, Munich for ZDF
- Directors: Georg Althammer, Werner Kließ
- cast:
  - Heiner Lauterbach as Thomas Dorn
  - Eva Kryll as Karin
- City: Cologne

=== Austria ===
- Produced by: ORF
- Directors: Rud'i Nemeth, Peter Müller
- cast:
  - Bernd Jeschek as Peter 'Bernd' Brucker
  - Bigi Fischer as Bigi Herzog
  - Hermann Schmid as Oberinspektor Nurmeier
- City: Vienna

=== Switzerland ===
- Produced by: SRG
- cast:
  - Alexander Radszun as Christian Merian
  - Wolfram Berger as Peter Brodbeck
- City: Basel

=== Italy ===
- Produced by: RAI2
- Music by: Stefano Mainetti (9 episodes)
- cast:
  - Diego Abatantuono as Commissario Bruno Corso
  - Bruno Pagni as Marco

=== France ===
- Produced by: France 2
- cast:
  - Patrick Raynal as Commissaire Nicolas Villars
  - Bertrand Lacy as Commissaire Luc Rousseau
  - Étienne Chicot as Jérôme Cortal
  - François Perrot
- City: Marseille

=== Spain ===
- Produced by: Velarde Films for Televisión Española
- cast:
  - Álvaro de Luna as Subcomisario Andrés Crespo

=== United Kingdom ===
- Produced by: Picture Palace Productions for Channel 4
- Director: Malcom Craddock
- cast:
  - John Benfield as Detective Constable George Jackson
  - Linda Henry as Linda Jackson
  - Jonathan Phillips as Stonehead
  - David Bradley as Roper

== See also ==
- List of German television series
