= Solo per te Lucia =

- Directed by: Franco Rossi
- Written by: Giorgio Prosperi; Edoardo Anton; Ugo Guerra; Rodolfo Sonego; Franco Rossi
- Cinematography: Arturo Gallea
- Music by: Giovanni D'Anzi
- Distributed by: Variety Distribution
- Release date: 9 October 1952
- Country: Italy
- Language: Italian

Solo per te Lucia is a 1952 Italian musical melodrama film directed by Franco Rossi and starring Mariella Lotti.The film is based on an Italian song of the same name by composed by Cesare Andrea Bixio and written by Bixio Cherubini.

The film is part of the sentimental melodramas very popular in the early 1950s in Italy. They were often referred to as strappalacrime (tearjerkers) in the 50s. They were later referred to as neorealismo d'appendice.

== Plot ==
An unmarried mother by the name of Lucia Dominici is raising her young son, Roberto, whose father has died. She works as a radio announcer and has successfully hidden her situation from her coworkers.

A technician at the station start, Mario Neri, reveals his feeling for her which she in turn reciprocates. However, Lucia does not reveal the truth about her son to him. Subsequently, she requests to be transferred to Turin to avoid the complications of the relationship.

Mario arranges an audition for TV program to keep Lucia from transferring to Turin. Despite the successful audition she declines the offer to move to Turin. Shortly before her departure, Roberto slips away from a maid is found by a traffic officer. The officer takes him to the radio station where Mario learns about Lucia's situation. Regardless of the situation Mario proposes to Lucia and she accepts.

== Cast ==
- Mariella Lotti as Lucia
- Luigi Tosi as Mario
- Paolo Panelli as Tonino
- Nerio Bernardi as Luciano
- Anna Vita as Liliana
- Franco Minervini as Paolo
- Claudio Villa
- Nilla Pizzi
- Achille Togliani
- Giacomo Rondinella
- Gilberto Mazzi
- Silvio Bagolini
- Marisa Mantovani
- Antonella Lualdi
- Flaminia Jandolo
- Ubaldo Lay
- Tino Scotti
- Cinico Angelini
- Vittorio Caprioli
- Alberto Collo
- Alberto Bonucci
- Nicolò Carosio

== See also ==
- La canzone dell'amore
- Franco Rossi (director)
- Mariella Lotti
- Cesare Andrea Bixio
- Bixio Cherubini
- Strappalacrime
- List of Italian films of 1952
