= Campane di Pompeii =

- Release date: 1952
- Country: Italy
- Language: Italian

Campane di Pompeii is a 1952 Italian film directed by Giuseppe Lombardi.
