= Liliana Bonfatti =

Italian actress (1930–2005)

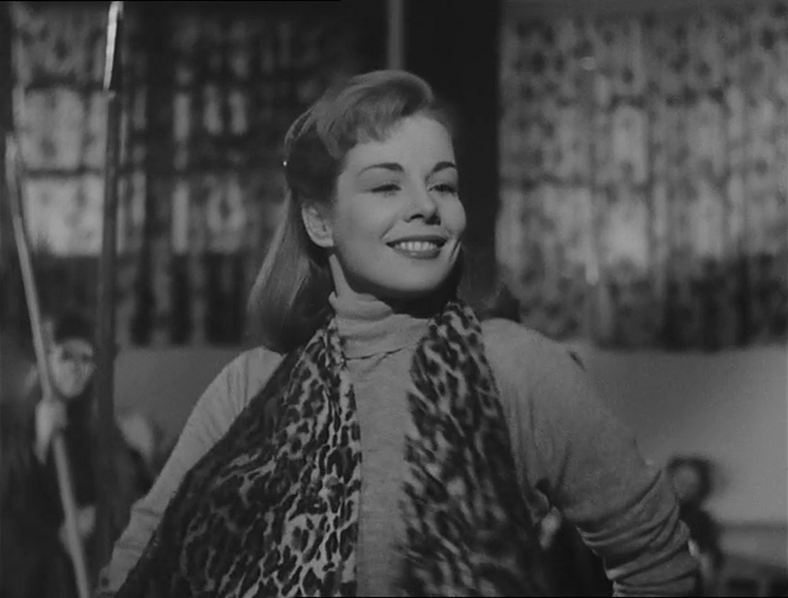
- Bonfatti in Il viale della speranza (1953)
- Born: 27 October 1930; Ovada, Italy
- Died: 19 December 2005 (aged 75)
- Occupation: Actress

Liliana Bonfatti (27 October 1930 – 19 December 2005) was an Italian film actress.

== Life and career ==
Born in Ovada, Province of Alessandria, Bonfatti lost her father at an early age, and moved with her family to Milan where she worked as a shop assistant, a manicurist and a seamstress. While on a beach vacation in Viareggio, two photographers who were looking for new faces for the Miss Italia competition took a picture of her; the photo was published in a magazine and got the attention of film director Luciano Emmer, who after auditioning her cast Bonfatti in the role of Lucia in Three Girls from Rome. Following the success of the film Bonfatti continued her career for a few years, until her sudden retirement in 1956.

Bonfatti died on 19 December 2005, at the age of 75.

== Filmography ==
- Three Girls from Rome, directed by Luciano Emmer (1952)
- Non è vero... ma ci credo, directed by Sergio Grieco (1952)
- Serenata amara, directed by Pino Mercanti (1952)
- Il viale della speranza, directed by Dino Risi (1953)
- The World Condemns Them, directed by Gianni Franciolini (1953)
- For You I Have Sinned, directed by Mario Costa (1953)
- Siamo tutti milanesi, directed by Mario Landi (1954)
- Trieste cantico d'amore, directed by Max Calandri (1954)
- La moglie è uguale per tutti, directed by Giorgio Simonelli (1955)
- Donatella, directed by Mario Monicelli (1956)
