= Servizio Informazioni Segrete =

Servizio Informazioni Segrete (SIS)
- Countries: Kingdom of Italy
- Branch: Regia Marina
- Type: Military intelligence
- Part of: Supermarina
- Engagements: Second Italo-Ethiopian War; Spanish Civil War; World War II

Commanders
- Notable commanders: Alberto Lais

The Servizio Informazioni Segrete (Secret Information Service, SIS) was the intelligence service of the Royal Italian Navy. SIS was instrumental in moulding Italian Army's operations during the Second Italo-Ethiopian War and the Battle of the Mediterranean, primarily due to its cryptanalysis successes and undercover operations.

Admiral Alberto Lais was its commander from 1931 to 1934 and from 1936 to January 1940, except for a brief period from July to October 1938. During World War II it was headed by Admiral Giuseppe Lombardi (from the start of the war to May 1941) and later by Admiral Francesco Maugeri (from May 1941 till the Armistice of Cassibile).

== Pre-war operations ==
=== Section B ===
In 1931 the head of the SIS Alberto Lais created a professional cryptological section (section B) led by Luigi Donini and Giorgio Verità Poeta. The cryptological section of SIS had forty-five men, including sixteen to twenty cryptanalysts. Donini and Verità Poeta managed to crack within a few weeks the main French naval cypher, the TMB. The subsequent TBM 2 and 3 versions were also quickly broken by the SIS. In November 1934 SIS cryptological section broke the Royal Navy administrative Naval Code.

=== Second Italo-Ethiopian War ===
Together with the army's secret service (Servizio Informazioni Militare) and the information service of the Regia Aeronautica (Servizio Informazioni dell'Aeronautica), the SIS decoded telegraphic correspondence within the Ethiopian Empire, including messages sent to and from the emperor and telegrams among the Ethiopian military commanders. In this way the Italians were well informed about the enemy's armament, mobilization, and troop movements.

=== Operation Rigoletto ===
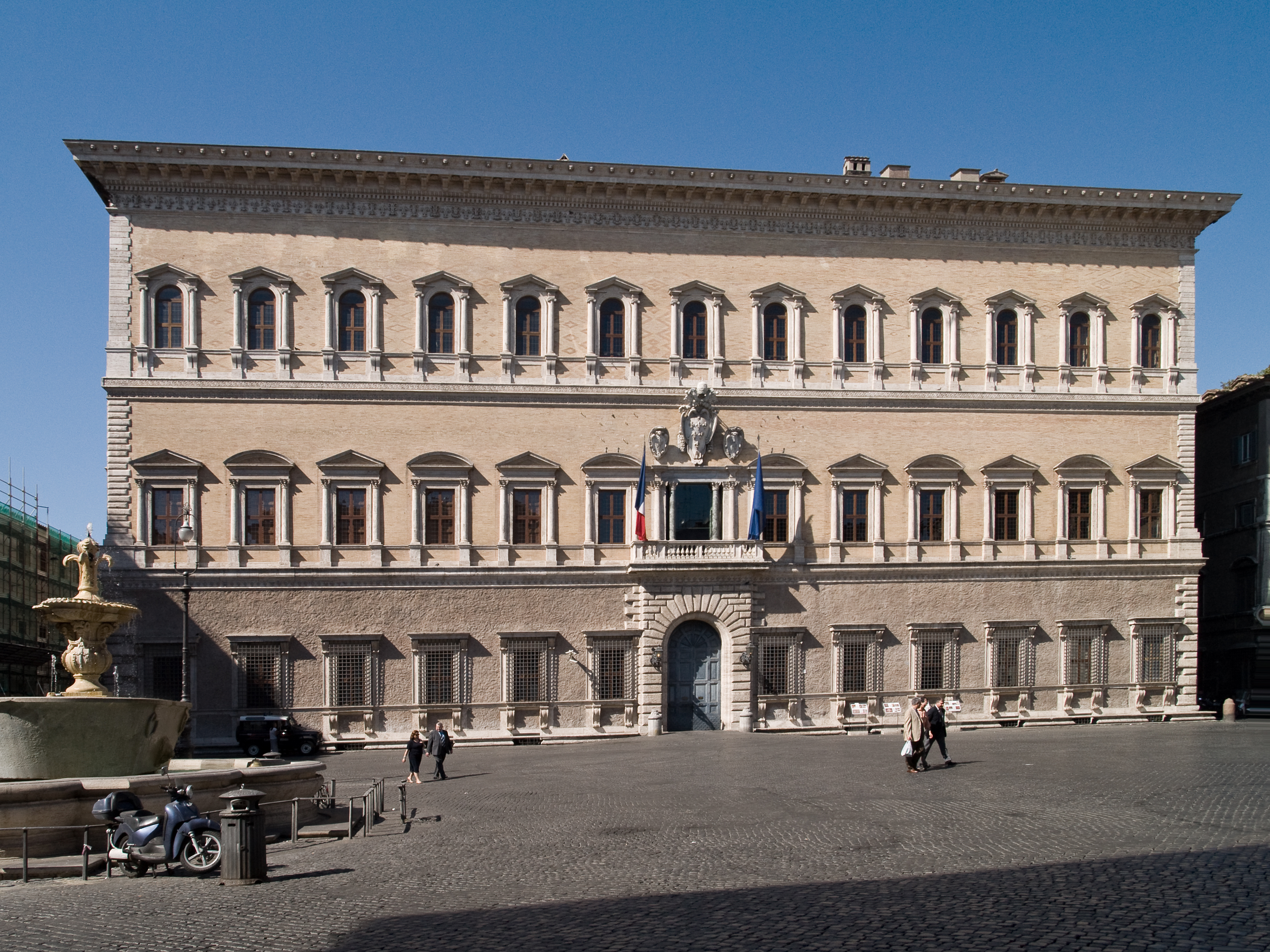
Palazzo Farnese, the seat of the French Embassy in Rome

In 1937 the chief of the SIS Alberto Lais conceived a bold operation with the aim to steal secret navy documents kept by the naval attaché in the French Embassy in Rome Capitaine de vaisseau De La Fond (code name: Rigoletto). The SIS agent Giuseppe Scordino became friends with the doorman of the embassy, Mr. Boccabella. Once he established a certain level of confidence, the Italian agent revealed himself and proposed Boccabella to collaborate. After some resistance, Boccabella eventually accepted recruitment.

In parallel, another SIS agent, Marshal Manca, was sent to seduce Mrs. Corbaz, the Italian maid of De La Fond. Once the young maid fell in love with Manca, he asked her to provide the footprints of the safe keys retained by De La Fond. Mrs. Corbaz did what she was asked and soon the SIS had gained access to the French embassy after replicating the keys and with Boccabella's cooperation.

For an entire year, Italian agents infiltrated the building by night. They read and took photos of secret documents and messages destined to the High Command of the French Navy. The Chief of Staff of the Regia Marina, Admiral Domenico Cavagnari, could read De La Fond's daily reports before they arrived in Paris. By reading some of the documents, the SIS discovered an operation aimed at stealing the schematics of the command tower of the new Littorio-class battleships (still under construction). The documents were to be provided to a French courier sent by the Deuxième Bureau by Giusto Antonio Gubitta, a corrupt engineer of the Gio. Ansaldo & C. The prompt intervention of the SIS led to the arrest of the traitor and his wife Clara Marchetto in Bordighera, a small town near the French border.

== World War II ==
SIS enjoyed great success in deciphering British naval codes in the Mediterranean. Among the most important successes gained by the Regia Marina's codebreakers during World War II was the message, decrypted on 5 July 1940, from Admiral of the Fleet Sir Andrew Cunningham to the Admiralty announcing his imminent sortie to attack the Sicilian coast on 9 July and listing in detail his forces. The SIS also read the British Naval Cypher No. 1 from September 1941 through January 1942.

=== The secret base aboard the Olterra ===
Olterra at anchor shortly before being broken up at Vado Ligure, 1961

The Italian consulate in the Spanish port of Algeciras, eight kilometres away across the bay to the west of Gibraltar, had been a base of the SIS since 1939. In fact, most of its clerks and officials were covert agents. The town's position, as recalled by former SIS agent Captain Venanzi, was unique. “Algeciras was a window open on Gibraltar.” Until 1943, this observation point was able to communicate movements and the presence of British warships to Supermarina back in Rome.

On 10 June 1940, when Italy entered World War II by declaring war on France and the United Kingdom, the Italian auxiliary ship Olterra was scuttled by her own crew to prevent her capture by British forces from Gibraltar. The SIS soon repurposed the interior of the Olterra as a base of operations for Italian frogmen of the Decima Flottiglia MAS.

Under the pretext of raising the ship to sell it to a Spanish owner, a team of members of the Decima, disguised as Italian civilian workers, took control of the tanker. Subsequent SLCs (siluri a lenta corsa, slow speed torpedoes) were shipped in multiple deliveries hidden among mechanical parts destined to the Olterra.

Thanks to the secret base aboard the Olterra, the Regia Marina was able to launch various attacks and sabotage against British ships on the other side of the bay. Only after the armistice of Cassibile, a member of the Italian embassy in Madrid revealed the Olterra's secret to Alan Hillgarth, and the ship was towed to Cádiz for a thorough inspection by embarrassed Spanish authorities. Until then, the British in Gibraltar had no proof to link the presence of the tanker at Algeciras with the raids on their ships. In Leon Goldsworthy's words:

We never found any proof of the part played by the Olterra in this affair. From British Naval Headquarters on Gibraltar we could see, with the naked eye, the Olterra’s superstructure above the exterior mole at Algeciras. The possibility that the Olterra might be associated in some way with the attacks of human torpedoes did not escape us, but there was never the least visible evidence to suggest the actual nature of her participation.

=== Operation Pesca di beneficenza ===
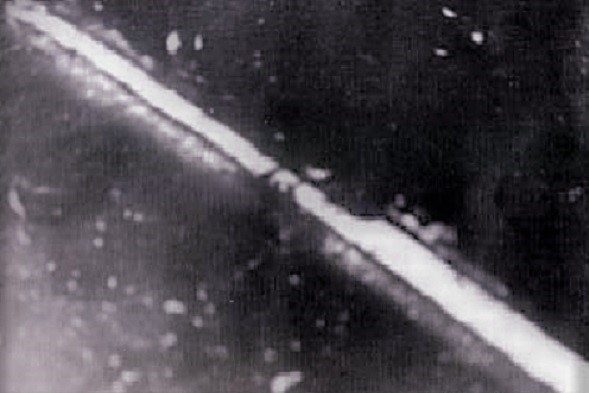
Mohawk's wreck lying in shallow water

In the spring of 1942 SIS ex-commander Alberto Lais planned and supervised Operation Pesca di beneficenza ("Lucky dip"), the recovery of British codebooks and other secret documents from the wreck of the destroyer HMS Mohawk, sunk by the Italian destroyer Luca Tarigo in shallow water off the Kerkennah Islands during the battle of the Tarigo Convoy. Two Italian officers, Mario De Monte and Eliseo Porta, disguised as fishermen managed to recover the British Naval Signal book and various top-secret documents from the wreck, but they weren't able to recover the Naval Cipher, which was hidden behind a bulkhead bent by the water pressure. Francesco De Robertis' 1954 movie Uomini ombra, starring Giorgio Albertazzi and Paolo Stoppa, is based on De Monte's Memoirs.

=== Intra-Axis co-operation ===
In 1932, Servizio Informazioni Segrete made contact with German B-Dienst to ask for help with intelligence sharing, with B-Dienst explicitly wanting French naval intercepts from the Mediterranean and a relationship was established in Spring 1933. In April 1933, German cryptanalyst Wilhelm Tranow and others traveled to Rome to exchange material through the German naval attaché. But the relationship soured due to Italy's role in the Stresa Front agreement. In 1936, the Italian Regia Marina made a further attempt, when both Adolf Hitler and Benito Mussolini required cooperation between the military intelligence agencies of both nations, but B-Dienst was not part of this agreement until 1936.

During World War II, SIS and B-Dienst were linked by a teleprinter and exchanged material, mostly intercepts. The two organizations shared a daily intelligence summary. As the war went on, however, relations between Fascist Italy and Nazi Germany became strained and Germans and Italians came to distrust each other. By January 1942 the two services had begun withholding information from each other. The Germans were particularly distrustful of Admiral Franco Maugeri, the head of the SIS. Albert Kesselring even accused Maugeri for passing secrets to the Allies, and being responsible for the loss of lives.

=== Operation C3 ===
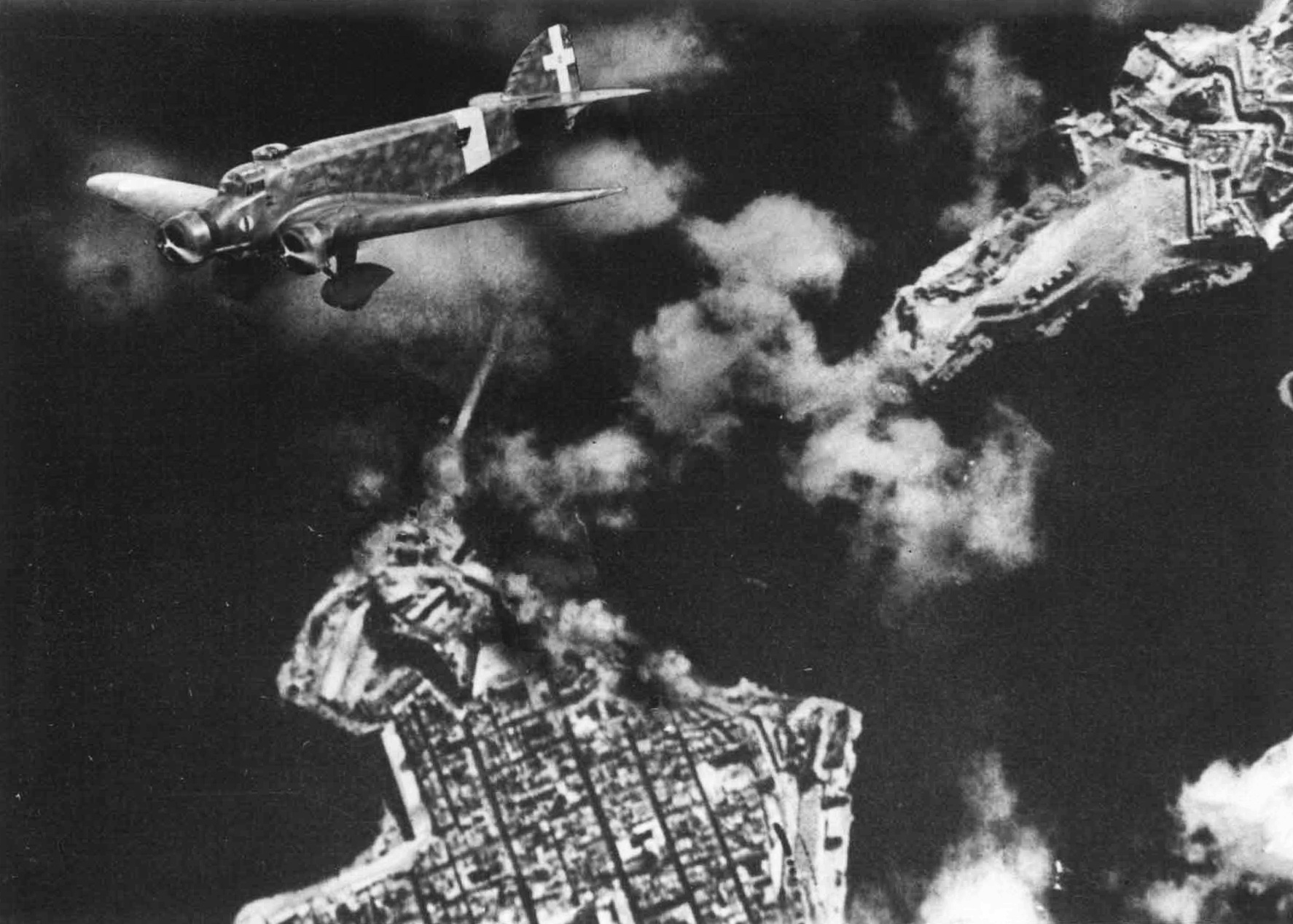
Italian bombing of the Grand Harbour, Malta

Servizio Informazioni Segrete played a key role in planning the aborted invasion of Malta (Operazione C3).

Early in the war the SIS had recognized that Malta was the keystone of the British Mediterranean defenses. According to the head of the SIS, Admiral Maugeri, its loss would have meant that Gibraltar and Alexandria would be cut off from each other, the lifeline sliced in two, the Strait and Suez blocked out completely. Maugeri was harshly opposed by the Italian Air Ministry, that, following Giulio Douhet's theories of total annihilation, insisted they could knock Malta out of the war with strategic bombing and at small cost in lives or matériel. At first the Air Ministry was backed by Mussolini, who decreed that Malta be blitzed out of business. The aerial campaign started out well. But as the raids continued Axis losses mounted. In February 1942 Italian losses in warships and merchant shipping in the Sicilian Passage (between Sicily and the coast of North Africa) reached alarming proportions.

At one of the daily meetings of Supermarina, Maugeri stated his ideas on the subject: unless Malta was invested Italians would have no chance in the Mediterranean, its convoys would be decimated, and the whole North African campaign compromised. Within a few days a detailed plan was born from it. The Italian Navy was to be responsible for the over-all operation; it was to provide transport, warship escort and cover for the landings from the sea. The Army was to provide the invasion troops and their supplies. The aerial phase of the action was to be placed in the hands of the Germans who would work with Italian Air Force. The Luftwaffe was to be charged with furnishing air cover during the landings and with dropping paratroopers. If approved, the invasion was planned for the end of July or the beginning of August, at the latest. It was to be preceded by an intensive two-month softening up by Italian bombers. Supermarina passed it on to the Joint General Staff, headed by General Ugo Cavallero, who also approved it. Finally the plan was approved at a meeting between Adolf Hitler and Benito Mussolini from 29 to 30 April 1942.

Like the Chief of Staff of Italian Comando Supremo, Field Marshal Ugo Cavallero, Admiral Maugeri maintained that Malta should have been a priority over the conquest of Egypt; his opinion was shared by Kesselring and Rintelen. Hitler, however, gradually grew sceptical of plans for a landing, and Generaloberst Alfred Jodl, Chief of the Operations Staff of the Oberkommando der Wehrmacht supported him in this, because he had little faith in Italian military capabilities.

Jodl informed Kesselring that, once the intensified air assault on the island had ended, the bulk of the Luftwaffe's aircraft would have to be transferred to other areas, so the main burden of the air attacks would fall largely on the Italian air force. The Wehrmacht's contribution to the landing operation could amount to no more than 1-2 paratroop regiments plus torpedo boats and minesweepers. It was soon clear that Italians could have counted on only minimal German assistance and would have to bear the brunt of the operation. Despite Kesselring's and Rommel's pressures, the plan was eventually cancelled.

In a diary entry from 17 August 1941, Maugeri expressed his frustration for the lack of collaboration between Germans and Italians in the Mediterranean Theatre:

To have elected the conquest of Egypt—not yet accomplished and God only knows if it will ever be—instead of the all-essential objective of capturing Malta. Those damned Germans! [...] Our ideas, doubtless more intelligent than theirs, are considered by them simply as the expression of our lack of willpower. Stupid Germans!

== Chiefs ==
No.	Portrait	Chief of the Servizio Informazioni Segrete	Took office	Left office	Time in office	Defence branch	Ref.
1	Alberto Lais	Admiral; Alberto Lais (1882–1951)	October 1938	January 1940	1 year, 3 months	Regia Marina	–
2	Giuseppe Lombardi	Divisional admiral Giuseppe Lombardi (1886–1978)	June 1940	May 1941	1 year, 31 days	Regia Marina	–
3	Francesco Maugeri	Admiral; Francesco Maugeri (1898–1978)	May 1941	8 September 1943	2 years, 130 days	Regia Marina	–

== Bibliography ==
- Maugeri, Franco (1948). Victor Rosen (ed.). From the Ashes of Disgrace. New York: Reynal & Hitchcock.
- Bragadin, Marcantonio (1969). "Lo spionaggio nella Seconda Guerra Mondiale: Italia". Storia Illustrata. XXIII (144): 28–38.
- Borghese, Valerio (1995). Sea Devils: Italian Navy Commandos in World War II. Naval Institute Press. ISBN 1-55750-072-X.
- Maugeri, Franco (1980). Ricordi di un marinaio: la Marina italiana dai primi del Novecento al secondo dopoguerra nelle memorie di uno dei suoi capi. Milan: Mursia.
- Donini, Luigi (1990). "Cryptographic Services of the Royal (British) and Italian Navies. A Comparative Analysis of their Activities during World War II". Cryptologia. XIV (2): 126.
- Rizza, Claudio (2008). "Scacco matto alle spie francesi". Notiziario Storico dell'Arma dei Carabinieri. III (3): 52–61.
- Ferraro, Gianni (2010). Enciclopedia dello spionaggio nella seconda guerra mondiale. Teti srl. ISBN 978-8888249278.
- Vento, Andrea (2014). In silenzio gioite e soffrite: storia dei servizi segreti italiani dal risorgimento alla guerra fredda. Milan: il Saggiatore. ISBN 978-88-565-0420-0.
- Cernuschi, Enrico (2018). "Breaking "ULTRA": The Cryptologic and Intelligence War between Britain and Italy, 1931–1943". Warship. Oxford: Osprey.
- Bagnoli, Gabriele (2019). Cesare Amé e i suoi Agenti. L'intelligence italiana nella Seconda Guerra Mondiale. Rome: Idrovolante Edizioni. ISBN 978-8899564360.
