= Shadows Over Trieste =

1952 film

- Directed by: Nerino Florio Bianchi
- Written by: Giorgio Bergamini; Roberto Bertea; Nerino Florio Bianchi; Tullio Kezich
- Produced by: Gianni Lorenzon; Giorgio Zorini
- Starring: Giulio Donnini; Livio Lorenzon; Adriana Innocenti
- Cinematography: Alceo Grimaldi
- Edited by: Nerino Florio Bianchi
- Production company: Ariston Film
- Release date: 1952
- Running time: 95 minutes
- Country: Italy
- Language: Italian

Shadows Over Trieste (Italian: Ombre su Trieste) is a 1952 Italian war drama film directed by Nerino Florio Bianchi and starring Giulio Donnini, Livio Lorenzon and Adriana Innocenti. It was part of a group of films made around the time that asserted Italy's unquestionable right to the disputed Free Territory of Trieste. It was funded by investors in Trieste and featured several local actors including Ketty Burba, a former Miss Trieste.

== Cast ==
- Felga Lauri as Lori
- Filiberto Conti as Iuri
- Giulio Donnini as Taiola
- Livio Lorenzon as Carmine
- Adriana Innocenti as Angela
- Tino Giordani as Bertino
- Grace Chiar as La baronessa
- Ketty Burba as Elena
- Raf Pindi as Don Mario

== Bibliography ==
- Pizzi, Katia. A City in Search of an Author. A&C Black, 2002.
