= Alpes–Isère Airport =

Grenoble Alpes–Isère Airport Aéroport Grenoble Alpes–Isère

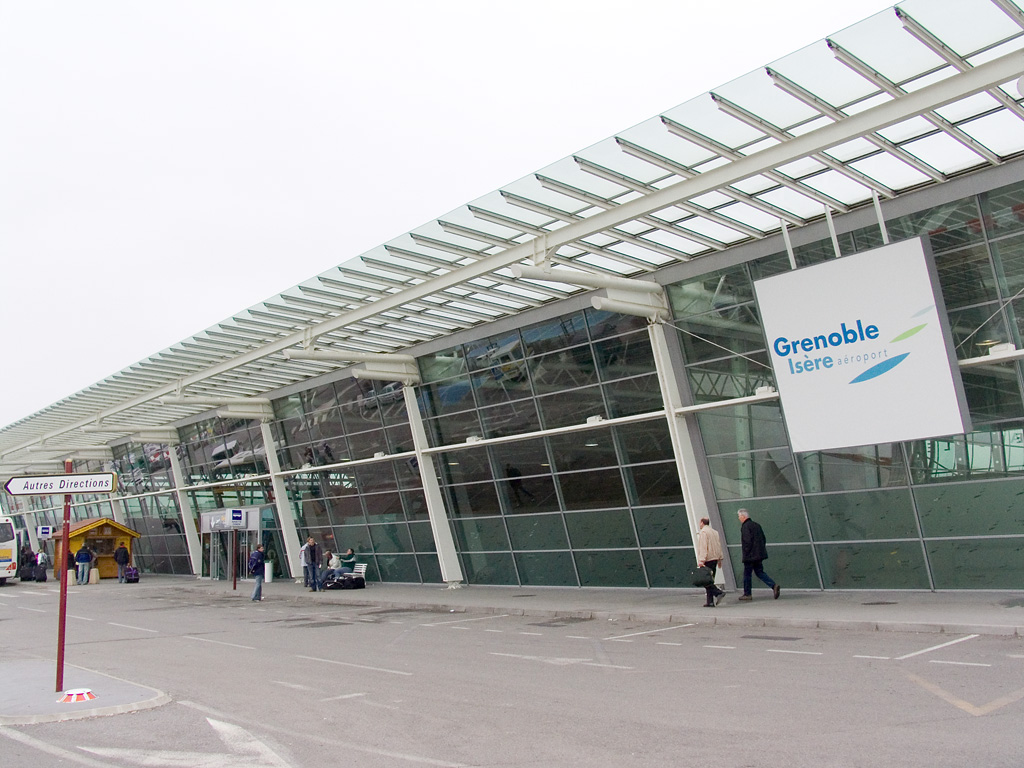
- IATA: GNB; ICAO: LFLS

Summary
- Serves: Grenoble, France
- Location: Saint-Étienne-de-Saint-Geoirs
- Elevation AMSL: 1,302 ft (397 m)
- Coordinates: 45°21′47″N 005°19′46″E
- Website: grenoble-airport.com

Map
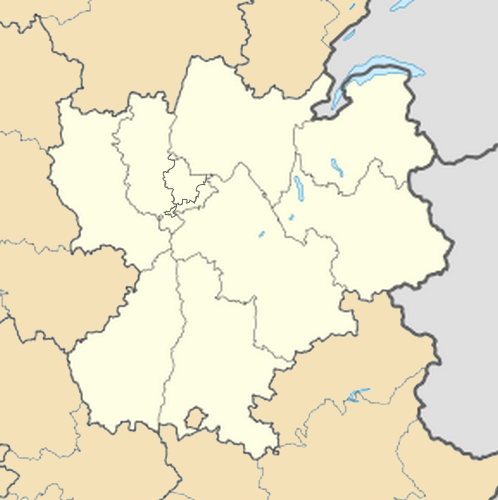
- Location of airport in Rhône-Alpes region LFLS (France)

Runways
Direction	Length		Surface
Direction	m	ft	Surface
09/27	3,050	10,007	Asphalt
09R/27L	900	2,952	Grass

Statistics (2023)
- Passengers: 243,146
- Passenger traffic change: ▲27.2%
- Aircraft movements: 3,791
- Aircraft movements change: ▲7.6%
- Source: French AIP Aeroport.fr

Grenoble Alpes–Isère Airport (IATA: GNB, ICAO: LFLS), is an international airport serving Grenoble which is situated 2.5 km north-northwest of Saint-Étienne-de-Saint-Geoirs and 40 km west-northwest of Grenoble, both communes in the Isère, département of France. The airport handled 307,979 passengers in 2019 and mostly caters to winter seasonal leisure travellers. A campus of the École nationale de l'aviation civile is also located at the airport. It is operated by Vinci Airports.

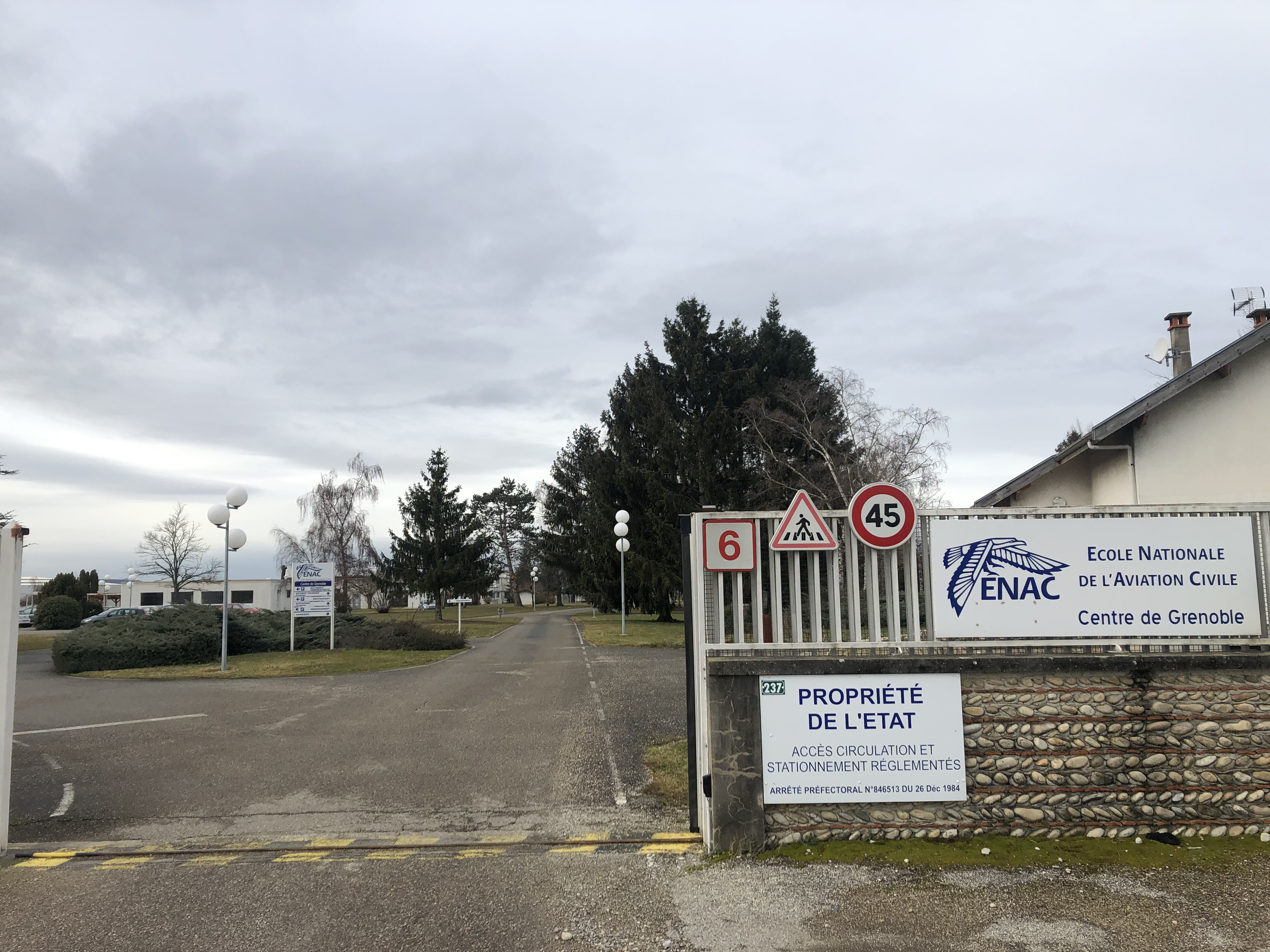
ENAC Grenoble

== Airlines and destinations ==
The following airlines operate regular scheduled and charter flights to and from Alpes–Isère Airport:

Airlines	Destinations
Aurigny	Seasonal: Guernsey
British Airways	Seasonal: London–Gatwick
easyJet	Seasonal: Birmingham, Bristol, Edinburgh, London–Gatwick, London–Luton, London–Southend, Manchester
Israir	Seasonal: Tel Aviv
Jet2.com	Seasonal: Birmingham, London–Gatwick (begins 13 December 2026), London–Stansted, Manchester, Newcastle upon Tyne
Norwegian Air Shuttle	Seasonal: Stockholm–Arlanda
Ryanair	Seasonal: Birmingham, Bristol, Dublin, London–Luton, London–Stansted, Manchester
Transavia	Seasonal: Rotterdam/The Hague
Wizz Air	Seasonal: London–Gatwick, London–Luton, Vilnius, Warsaw–Chopin

== Ground transport ==
Buses connect the airport with the centre of Grenoble.
