= Alberto Lais =

Italian admiral

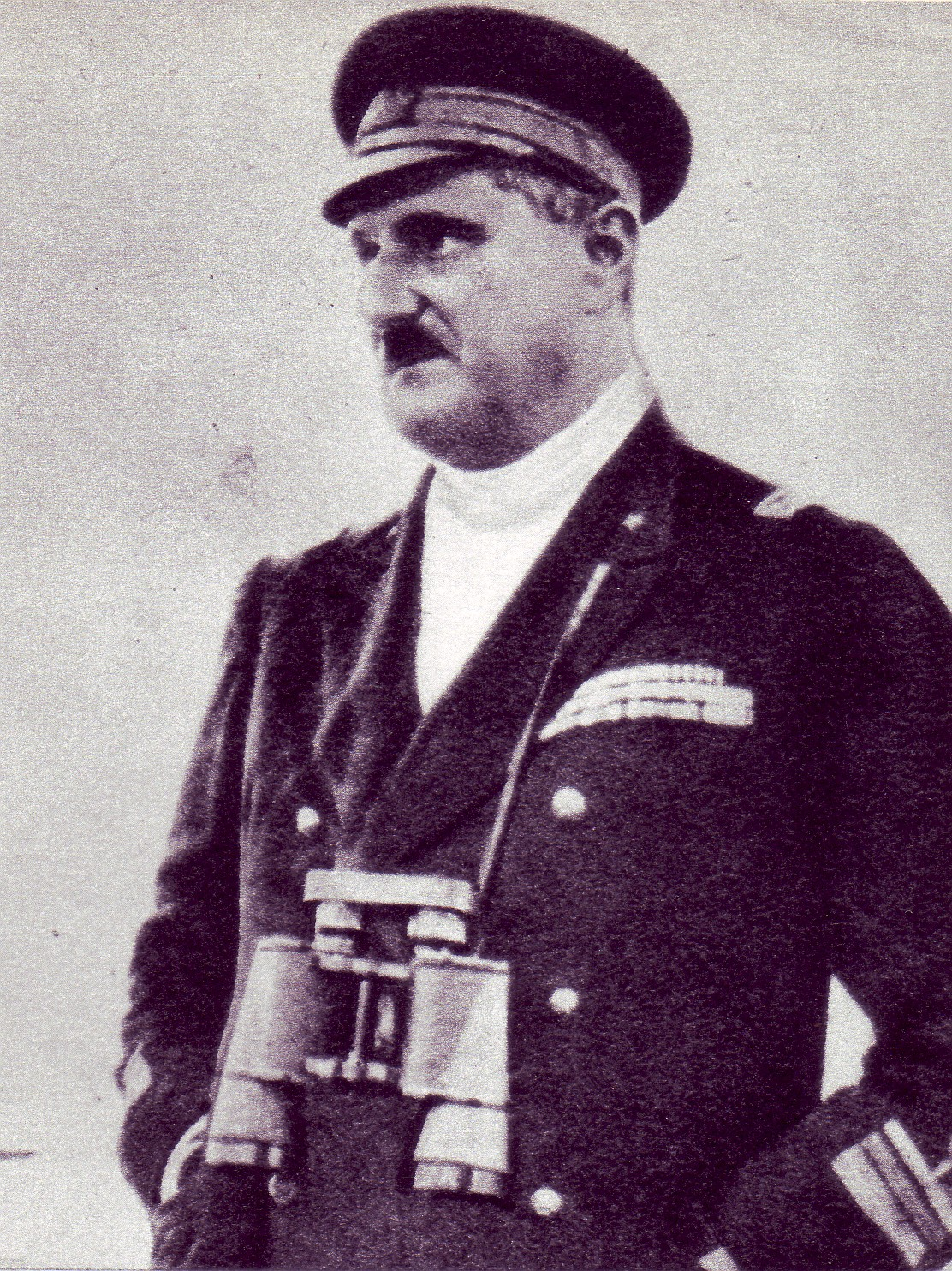
- Born: 4 September 1882; Rome, Kingdom of Italy
- Died: 7 December 1951 (aged 69); Rome, Italy
- Military career
- Allegiance: Kingdom of Italy
- Branch: Regia Marina
- Rank: Admiral
- Commands: Impavido (destroyer); Indomito (destroyer); 1st Destroyer Squadron; Servizio Informazioni Segrete; Pola (heavy cruiser); Brindisi Naval Command; 4th Naval Division; 6th Naval Division
- Conflicts: Italo-Turkish War; World War I; World War II
- Awards: Bronze Medal of Military Valor; War Cross of Military Valor; Order of the Crown of Italy; Order of Saints Maurice and Lazarus

Alberto Lais (Rome, 4 September 1882 – 7 December 1951) was an Italian admiral during World War II, naval attaché in Washington and member of the Servizio Informazioni Segrete.

== Biography ==
He was born in Rome on 4 September 1882, the third of four brothers, son of Nicola Lais and Ernesta Franceschetti. He entered the Livorno Naval Academy in 1901, and in 1905 he embarked as Ensign on the battleship Sardegna. He participated in the Italo-Turkish War of 1911-1912 as executive officer of the torpedo boat Orsa, earning a Bronze Medal of Military Valor. On 25 April 1914 he married Leonor Evans, from whom he had three children, Alberto (born in 1915), Lucio (born in 1918) and Edna (born in 1920). During World War I he served initially as aide to the commander of the 2nd Naval Division and later as commander of coastal torpedo boats, earning a War Cross of Military Valor. From 1923 to 1925 he commanded the destroyer Impavido and later her sister ship Indomito.

In 1925 he was assigned to the Institute of Naval Warfare, and from June 1926 to August 1929 he served as Naval Attaché in Washington. From December 1929 to August 1931 che commanded the 1st Destroyer Squadron, after which he became head of the Servizio Informazioni Segrete (SIS), the intelligence service of the Royal Italian Navy, a post he held until March 1934, when he became commander of the heavy cruiser Pola. In March 1936 he left the command of Pola to become naval commander of Brindisi, and in November 1936 he returned to his position as head of the SIS. From July to October 1938, after promotion to vice admiral, he briefly commanded the 4th and later the 6th Naval Division, after which he once again returned at the head of the SIS, planning and directing in 1939 Operation Rigoletto, the theft of secret codes from the French embassy in Rome. During his tenure he modernized the SIS, greatly improving its efficiency and capabilities.

In January 1940 he was again posted to Washington as naval attaché, and remained there even after Italy's entry into World War II. In March 1941, following leaked information about American plans for the seizure of all Italian merchant ships interned in U.S. ports, which was feared would be then handed over to the United Kingdom, he issued a secret order for all Italian ships in the United States to be sabotaged so as to render them unusable. The order was carried out in late March; altogether, the liner Conte Biancamano, one tanker, twenty-three steam freighters and two motor freighters were sabotaged by their crews, which focused on disabling the ships' engines, as Lais had explicitly ordered to avoid scuttling or setting fire to the ships, in order to cause no damage to American port facilities and thus avoid the crews being prosecuted according to the Espionage Act of 1917. Nonetheless, when the sabotage was discovered all crews were arrested, with captains being tried and sentenced to prison terms and the rest being interned in Fort Missoula, Montana, and Lais was declared persona non grata and expelled from the United States in April 1941.

After returning to Italy, Lais briefly resumed service with the SIS, planning and supervising Operation "Pesca di beneficenza" ("Lucky dip"), the recovery of British codebooks and other secret documents from the wreck of the destroyer HMS Mohawk, sunk during the battle of the Tarigo Convoy. On 10 July 1941 he was made head of the Technical Inspectorate of the General Directorate of the Merchant Navy, and retired from active service in 1944. From October 1944 to January 1947 he served as Extraordinary Commissioner of the Naval League, and from January 1947 to March 1948 as President of the Naval League. He died in Rome on 7 December 1951.

In 1962 British author H. Montgomery Hyde claimed, in his book The Quiet Canadian: The Secret Service Story of Sir William Stephenson, that while serving as naval attaché in Washington Lais had been seduced by American spy (working for the British secret service) Amy Elizabeth Thorpe, known as Cynthia, and persuaded to hand over to her the codebooks of the Italian Navy, leading to British victory in the battle of Cape Matapan. Lais's son Lucio, also a naval officer, sued Hyde in 1966 for defamation against his deceased father; he won the trial and the publisher withdrew the book from the Italian market already before the sentence. The Italian Ministry of Defense stated that Lais had indeed passed information to Cynthia, but that she had deliberately been given false information, as a counter-espionage operation. In the 1970s it was revealed that Italian naval codes had been broken by the Government Code and Cypher School without the use of codebooks.
