= The World Condemns Them =

- French film poster
- Directed by: Gianni Franciolini
- Written by: Suso Cecchi D'Amico; Diego Fabbri
- Cinematography: Anchise Brizzi; Rodolfo Lombardi
- Music by: Piero Piccioni
- Release date: March 7, 1953
- Language: Italian

The World Condemns Them (Italian: Il mondo le condanna, French: Les Anges déchus) is a 1953 Italian-French melodrama film directed by Gianni Franciolini.

== Cast ==
- Alida Valli as Renata Giustini
- Amedeo Nazzari as Paolo Martelli
- Serge Reggiani as André
- Claude Nollier as Maria Martelli
- Franco Interlenghi as Franco
- Laura Solari as Miss Balestra
- Bianca Doria as Mother of Renata
- Liliana Bonfatti as Nina Swanson
