= Three Girls from Rome =

1952 film

- Directed by: Luciano Emmer
- Written by: Sergio Amidei; Fausto Tozzi; Karin Valde
- Produced by: Giorgio Agliani
- Starring: Lucia Bosè; Renato Salvatori; Marcello Mastroianni
- Cinematography: Rodolfo Lombardi
- Edited by: Jolanda Benvenuti
- Music by: Carlo Innocenzi
- Release date: 20 December 1951
- Running time: 99 Min
- Country: Italy
- Language: Italian

Three Girls from Rome (Italian: Le ragazze di Piazza Spagna, released as Girls of the Spanish Steps in the UK) is a 1952 Italian classic comedy drama film directed by Luciano Emmer.

== Cast ==
- Lucia Bosè as Marisa
- Cosetta Greco as Elena
- Liliana Bonfatti as Lucia
- Renato Salvatori as Augusto
- Marcello Mastroianni as Marcello
- Mario Silvani as Alberto
- Ave Ninchi as Marisa's mother
- Leda Gloria as Elena's mother
- Eduardo De Filippo as Vittorio
- Anna Maria Gugliari as Leda
- Giorgio Bassani as the Narrator

== Remake ==
In 1998 there was a remake for RAI2 television, a miniseries starring Romina Mondello, Vittoria Belvedere and Alice Evans followed by a 180-minute movie Le Ragazze Di Piazza Di Spagna 2 a year later and a third, Le Ragazze di Piazza di Spagna 3. Both sequels were later reissued as two 90-minute parts miniseries each.
