= Saint-Étienne-de-Saint-Geoirs =

- Commune
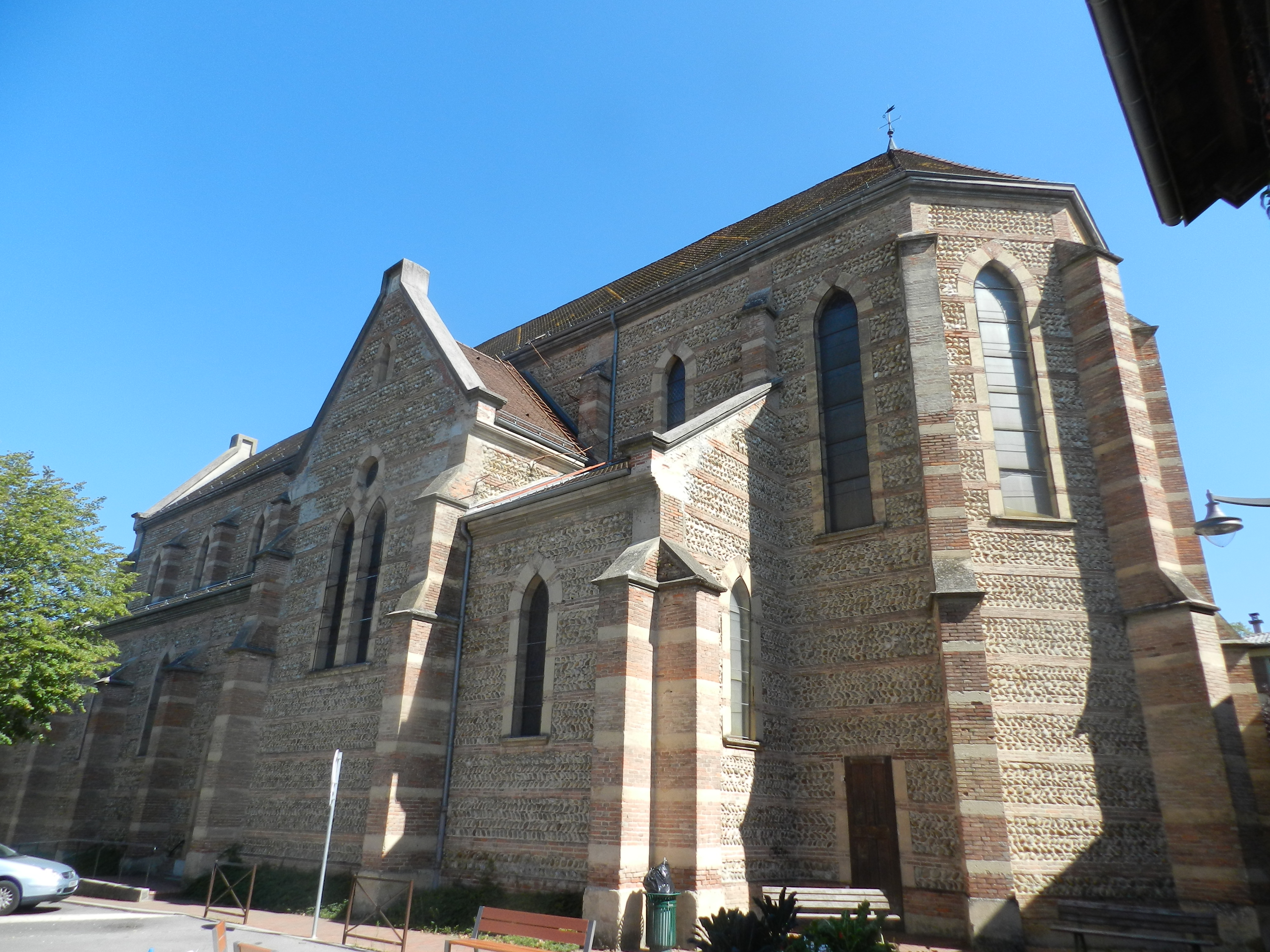
- The church of Saint-Étienne-de-Saint-Geoirs

- Coat of arms
- Location of Saint-Étienne-de-Saint-Geoirs
- Location within France Location within Auvergne-Rhône-Alpes
- Coordinates: 45°19′59″N 5°21′00″E
- Country: France
- Region: Auvergne-Rhône-Alpes
- Department: Isère
- Arrondissement: Vienne
- Canton: Bièvre
- Intercommunality: Bièvre Isère

Government
  - Mayor (2020–2026): Michel Veyron
- Area^{1}: 10.88 km^{2} (4.20 sq mi)
- Highest elevation: 545 m (1,788 ft)
- Lowest elevation: 369 m (1,211 ft)
- Population (2023): 3,425
  - Density: 314.8/km^{2} (815.3/sq mi)
- Time zone: UTC+01:00 (CET)
  - Summer (DST): UTC+02:00 (CEST)
- INSEE/Postal code: 38384 /38590
- ^{1} French Land Register data, which excludes lakes, ponds, glaciers > 1 km^{2} (0.386 sq mi or 247 acres) and river estuaries.

Saint-Étienne-de-Saint-Geoirs (French pronunciation: [sɛ̃t‿etjɛn də sɛ̃ ʒwaʁ]; literally 'Saint-Étienne of Saint-Geoirs') is a commune in the Isère department in southeastern France. The commune hosts the Alpes–Isère Airport

Saint-Étienne-de-Saint-Geoirs is the hometown of Rose Valland, who saved thousands of works of art from Nazi looting and destruction during World War II and thwarted German efforts to remove art by passing information to the French Resistance. The organization Memoire de Rose Valland is based in Saint-Étienne-de-Saint-Geoirs.

Singer (bass) and actor Xavier Depraz died in Saint-Étienne-de-Saint-Geoirs on 18 October 1994. Bandit Louis Mandrin was born there.

== Population ==
Historical population

Year	Pop.	±% p.a.
1793	1,519	—
1821	1,885	+0.77%
1846	1,970	+0.18%
1872	1,836	−0.27%
1901	1,615	−0.44%
1926	1,417	−0.52%
1946	1,260	−0.59%
1962	1,231	−0.15%
1968	1,209	−0.30%

Year	Pop.	±% p.a.
1975	1,606	+4.14%
1982	1,909	+2.50%
1990	2,164	+1.58%
1999	2,240	+0.38%
2007	2,575	+1.76%
2012	3,152	+4.13%
2017	3,225	+0.46%
2023	3,425	+1.01%

Source: EHESS and INSEE (1968-2023)

== Twin towns ==
Saint-Étienne-de-Saint-Geoirs is twinned with:

- Casorate Sempione, Italy, since 2013

== See also ==
- Communes of the Isère department
- Grenoble-Isère Airport
