= Francesco Maugeri =

Italian admiral

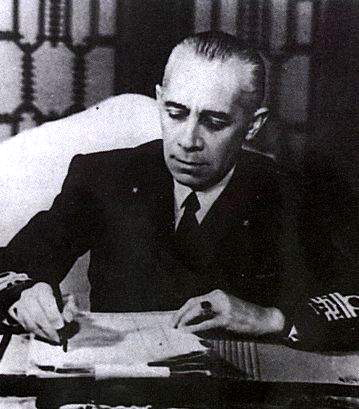
- Born: 14 October 1898; Gela, Kingdom of Italy
- Died: 8 September 1978 (aged 79); Turin, Italy
- Military career
- Allegiance: Kingdom of Italy; Italy
- Branch: Regia Marina; Italian Navy
- Rank: Admiral
- Commands: Giovanni Nicotera (destroyer); 7th Destroyer Squadron; Pola (heavy cruiser); Giovanni delle Bande Nere (light cruiser); Bolzano (heavy cruiser); Servizio Informazioni Segrete; Northern Tyrrhenian Naval Department; Navy Chief of Staff; Southern Tyrrhenian Naval Department
- Conflicts: World War I; World War II; Battle of Calabria; Battle of Cape Spada; Battle of Cape Spartivento; Battle of Cape Matapan
- Awards: Silver Medal of Military Valour (four times); Bronze Medal of Military Valour (four times); War Merit Cross; Military Order of Italy; Order of the Crown of Italy; Order of Saints Maurice and Lazarus; Legion of Merit

Francesco Maugeri (Gela, 14 October 1898 – Turin, 8 September 1978) was an Italian admiral, head of the Servizio Informazioni Segrete during World War II and Chief of Staff of the Marina Militare between 1947 and 1948.

== Biography ==
Maugeri entered the Livorno Naval Academy in November 1911 and graduated as ensign on 14 October 1915. He participated in the Great War with the 255th Seaplane Squadron, earning two Silver Medals of Military Valour and being promoted to lieutenant in 1918. In 1927 he was promoted to lieutenant commander, and from May 1929 to January 1931 he commanded the destroyer Giovanni Nicotera; in 1932 he was promoted to commander and assigned as staff officer to the command of the 1st Fleet, and later given command of the 7th Destroyer Squadron from 29 July 1935. From 30 September 1936 he taught naval art at the prestigious Military High School of the Army in Turin; in 1937 he was promoted to captain and given command of the heavy cruiser Pola from 16 September 1938 to 2 August 1939 and then of the light cruiser Giovanni delle Bande Nere from 3 August 1939 to 15 November 1940.

As commanding officer of Bande Nere, he participated in the battle of Punta Stilo and in the battle of Cape Spada in the summer of 1940. On 16 November 1940 he assumed command of the heavy cruiser Bolzano, participating in the battle of Cape Spartivento and in the battle of Cape Matapan. On 5 May 1941 he left command of Bolzano and was promoted to rear admiral, and on 24 May 1941 he was given command of Servizio Informazioni Segrete (SIS), the Italian Navy's intelligence service, a post he held for the following two and a half years. After Benito Mussolini's ousting and arrest on 25 July 1943, Maugeri escorted him to Ponza, where he was imprisoned till 7 August, and then again during his subsequent transfer to La Maddalena, where he was held until his final transfer to Campo Imperatore on 27 August. Maugeri would later recount his conversations with Mussolini in the book Mussolini mi ha detto (Mussolini told me), published in late 1944.

According to some sources, Maugeri was one of the main players in the negotiation for the surrender of Italy to the Allies during the summer of 1943, for the part concerning the fleet. After the Armistice of Cassibile, he remained in Rome even after the disbandment of Supermarina and the flight of his superiors; after the German occupation of the capital, he went into hiding and formed a clandestine intelligence network, comprising many of his SIS subordinates, which gathered information on German movements and passed them to the Allies. This continued until the liberation of Rome, on 4 June 1944.

In early 1945 Maugeri was promoted to vice admiral, and after the end of the war he was given command of the Northern Tyrrhenian Naval Department, with headquarters in La Spezia. He was later promoted to admiral and served as chief of staff of the Marina Militare from 1 January 1947 to 4 November 1948, replacing Admiral Raffaele de Courten. He also held the posts of commander-in-chief of the Southern Tyrrhenian Naval Department, of vice president of the Naval Section of the Superior Council of the Armed Forces and of military advisor at the Italian delegation to the NATO.

In 1948 Admiral Maugeri wrote in English the book From the ashes of disgrace, published in New York and never translated in Italy, recounting his experience during the war expressing sympathy for the Allies and aversion to the Axis cause. In the late 1970s he published in Italy his memoirs, Ricordi di un marinaio, largely based on his previous book but with some changes in the most controversial parts.

After the war, Maugeri became the target of a press campaign launched by neo-Fascist newspapers and writers, who accused him of having betrayed Italy during the war, secretly working for the Allies even before the Armistice of Cassibile. These accusations were based on some sentences contained in his book From the ashes of disgrace ("The winter of '42 -'43 found many of us, who hoped for a free Italy, faced with this harsh, bitter and painful truth: we would never be able to free ourselves from our chains, if the Axis had been victorious… The more one loved his country, the more he had to pray for its defeat on the battlefield... End the war, no matter how, at any cost") and on the fact that Maugeri had been awarded the Legion of Merit on 4 July 1948 for "services rendered to the United States government" ("for the exceptionally deserving conduct in the performance of superior services rendered to the United States government, as head of the naval intelligence service, as commander of the naval base of La Spezia and as chief of staff of the Italian navy during and after the Second World War"). The issue provoked several controversies with more or less explicit accusations about Maugeri's role. A parliamentary commission of inquiry and an internal commission of the Navy were ordered, headed by Randolfo Pacciardi (Minister of Defense from 1948 to 1953). The latter, while clearing Maugeri from the explicit accusation of treason, strongly criticized his behavior: "This serious shortcoming has caused the publication in the book of some sentences that have had the most deplorable repercussions in Italy and especially in the Navy".

This controversy costed Maugeri the post of Chief of Staff; he was transferred to the Naval Department of Naples. He filed lawsuits against his most vocal accusers, such as far-right journalist Filippo Nicolò Mancuso and neo-Fascist writer Antonino Trizzino; both were sentenced for defamation, although Trizzino appealed the sentence and was later absolved. Later historical research showed that documents provided by Trizzino and presented as evidence of Maugeri's treason during the trial had actually been fabricated. The citation for the Legion of Merit referred to services carried out by Maugeri after the Armistice of Cassibile, during Italy's co-belligerence with the Allies. The Military Prosecutor's Office declared that "no action is to be taken against Maugeri for lack of any evidence regarding the facts", and Admiral Luigi Sansonetti, who had been Deputy Chief of Staff during the war, testified that "Whenever the movement of naval forces was known to only a few senior officers including the SIS, it remained perfectly secret".

Having left active service in April 1955, Maugeri died in Turin on 8 September 1978.
