= Paris Is Always Paris =

1951 Italian-French film

- Directed by: Luciano Emmer
- Written by: Luciano Emmer
- Produced by: Giuseppe Amato
- Starring: Aldo Fabrizi
- Cinematography: Henri Alekan
- Edited by: Jacques Poitrenaud; Gabriele Varriale
- Music by: Roman Vlad
- Release date: 15 November 1951
- Running time: 110 minutes
- Countries: Italy; France
- Languages: Italian; French

Paris Is Always Paris (Italian: Parigi è sempre Parigi, French: Paris est toujours Paris) is a 1951 Italian-French comedy film directed by Luciano Emmer. It was entered into the competition at the 12th Venice International Film Festival.

== Cast ==
- Aldo Fabrizi as Andrea De Angelis
- Henri Guisol as Monsieur Morand
- Ave Ninchi as Elvira de Angelis
- Jeannette Batti as Claudia
- Hélène Rémy as Christine
- Henri Génès as Paul Gremier
- Marcello Mastroianni as Marcello Venturi
- Lucia Bosé as Mimi de Angelis
- Carlo Sposito as Toto Mancuso (credited as Carletto Sposito)
- Giuseppe Porelli as Raffaele D'Amore
- Janine Marsay as Praline
- Galeazzo Benti as Gianni Forlivesi
- Paolo Panelli as Nicolino Percuoco
- Franco Interlenghi as Franco Martini
- Yves Montand as himself
- Eartha Kitt as uncredited cameo as herself / cabaret singer
- Roland Lesaffre
