= Cavalcata di mezzo secolo =

1952 film

- Distributed by: Variety Distribution
- Release date: 1952
- Country: Italy
- Language: Italian

Cavalcata di mezzo secolo is a 1952 Italian film directed by Luciano Emmer
