= Louis Mandrin =

French outlaw (1725–1755)

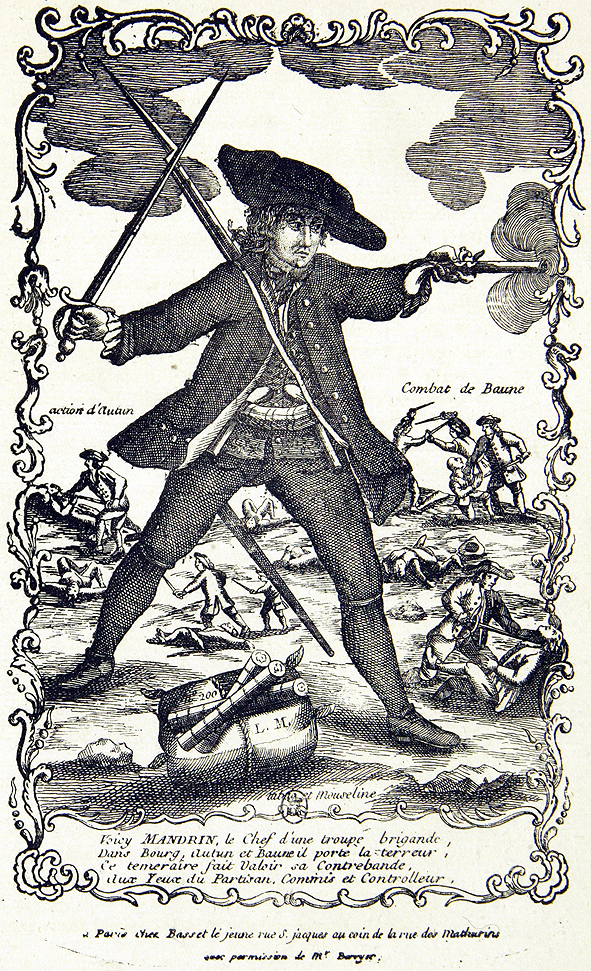
- Born: 11 February 1725; Dauphiné, Kingdom of France
- Died: 26 May 1755 (aged 30); Valence, Drôme, Kingdom of France
- Occupations: highwayman, smuggler
- Years active: Early-mid 18th Century
- Known for: He has been called the Robin Hood of France and was executed by being broken on the wheel and strangled to death

Signature
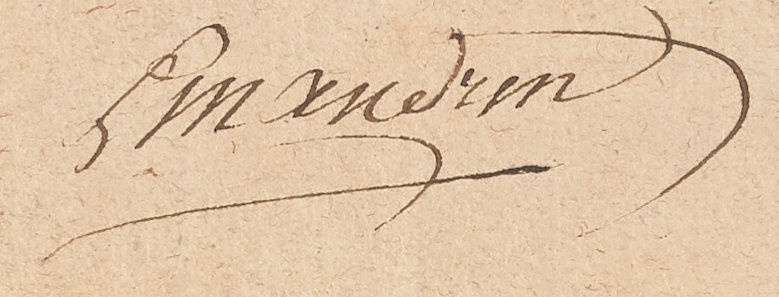

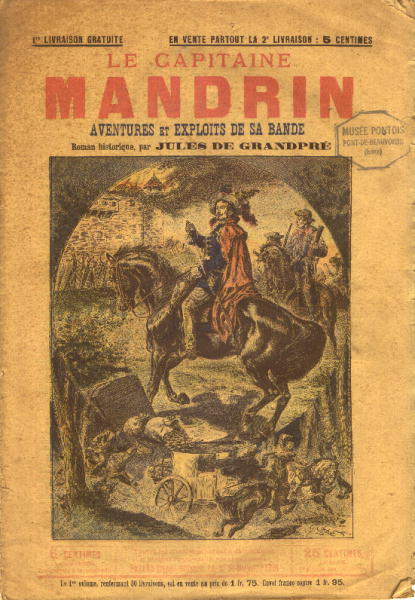
Captain Mandrin, book cover

Louis Mandrin (pronounced lwi mɑ̃dʁɛ̃; 11 February 1725 – 26 May 1755) was a French smuggler (highwayman) from Dauphiné.

== Biography ==
Mandrin has been called the Robin Hood of France. He became famous for his rebellion against the Ferme générale, the hated privatized tax collecting agency of the French ancien régime (royal government). Government taxes in his time were levied on salt (the gabelle), tobacco, and farming. The tax collectors, called fermiers, or (tax) farmers, were in charge of collecting all taxes for the king, but the total amount of the tax to be paid by the population was not specified; the tax collectors needed to pay only the pre-agreed amount to the king, but could exact unspecified sums themselves. Many of them were greedy and became extremely wealthy and powerful through their exactions from the public. The tax collectors were therefore hated by the people. During the French Revolution, 28 of the 40 former fermiers généraux would be guillotined on 8 May 1794.

Louis Mandrin was born in 1725 at Saint-Étienne-de-Saint-Geoirs, Dauphiné, then a border province. His family was well established in the region, but was no longer as prosperous as in the past. Louis's father, a horse merchant, died when Louis was 17, leaving nine children. Louis, as the eldest, became head of the family.

Mandrin's first run-in with the fermiers was in 1748. He was under contract to supply to French army in Italy with "100 mules minus three." Unfortunately, crossing the Alps was difficult and most of the animals died on the way to their destination, Saint-Étienne-de-Saint-Geoirs. Mandrin had only 17 mules left when he arrived, and they were in such a sorry state that the tax collectors refused to pay him.

Five years later, on 27 July 1753, Mandrin and his friend Benoît Brissaud were involved in a brawl and their opponents were killed. Brissaud was sentenced to death and Mandrin to the galleys. Mandrin managed to flee but Brissaud was caught and hanged in Breuil square (now Place Grenette) in Grenoble. On the same day, Mandrin's brother Pierre was hanged for counterfeiting. Mandrin declared a personal war against the tax collectors.

Mandrin joined a gang of smugglers operating between the Cantons of Switzerland, France, and Savoy, which was then a sovereign state. They trafficked mainly in tobacco. Mandrin soon became head of this gang - a small army of some 300 men which he led and organised like a military regiment. They had warehouses for weapons and stolen goods in Savoy, where Mandrin believed himself out of the reach from the French authorities. During 1754 he organised six military-style campaigns. He and his men targeted only the most unpopular tax collectors, which gained them huge support from the local population. Mandrin bought goods (cloth, hides, tobacco, canvas and spices) in Switzerland, which he then resold in French towns without paying the Ferme Générale any of the tax due. The population was delighted with such bargains. Soon the French government passed laws forbidding the population to buy these smuggled goods. Mandrin reacted to the ban by going to Rodez and forcing Ferme Générale employees to buy his goods at gunpoint.

The Ferme générale, exasperated by Mandrin's growing popularity, obtained help from the Royal Army, but Mandrin took refuge in Savoy, near Pont-de-Beauvoisin. The tax collectors then decided to enter the Duchy illegally, disguising their 500 men as peasants. Mandrin was betrayed by two of his men, and the tax collectors seized him at a fortified farm in Rochefort-en-Novalaise. When the King of Savoy, Charles Emmanuel III of Sardinia, learned of the French intrusion into his territory, he immediately wrote to the French King Louis XV, demanding that the prisoner be turned over to him, and the French King agreed. However, the tax collectors were so eager to be rid of Mandrin that they had hurried through his trial and execution before the king's message reached them.

Mandrin was tried on 24 May 1755 and sentenced to be broken on the wheel, a penalty reserved for serious offenders, in Valence, Drôme on 26 May. He was executed on 26 May 1755 in front of 6,000 onlookers, many of them sympathetic. His arms, legs and stomach were hit and broken with an iron bar and he was then hoisted on a wheel with his arms and legs under him. Mandrin endured the torture without a cry. After eight minutes, he was strangled to put an end to his suffering. His broken body was put on display. Many angry and sympathetic notes were left near the body. It was the beginning of the legend.

Mandrin's struggle against the injustice of the Ancien Régime was discussed across Europe and the cause taken up by Voltaire (who compared him with the king of Prussia) and Turgot. Mandrin's status as a rebel folk hero was cemented. A popular ballad arose, the Complainte de Mandrin, that was sung throughout France and is still known today. Its author remains unknown.

Extremely popular during his life, Mandrin remains famous to this day, in his native Dauphiné, in the Savoie and to a lesser degree, in the rest of France.

== La complainte de Mandrin (Mandrin's Lament) ==
The music of this ballad, which dates to the year of Mandrin's execution, 1755, is excerpted from an opera by Jean-Philippe Rameau, composed in 1733: Hippolyte et Aricie. It was then covered anonymously under the title by which it is still known. The text was also published as an appendix to a book titled Précis de la vie de Louis Mandrin ("Treatise on the Life of Louis Mandrin").

== Popular culture ==
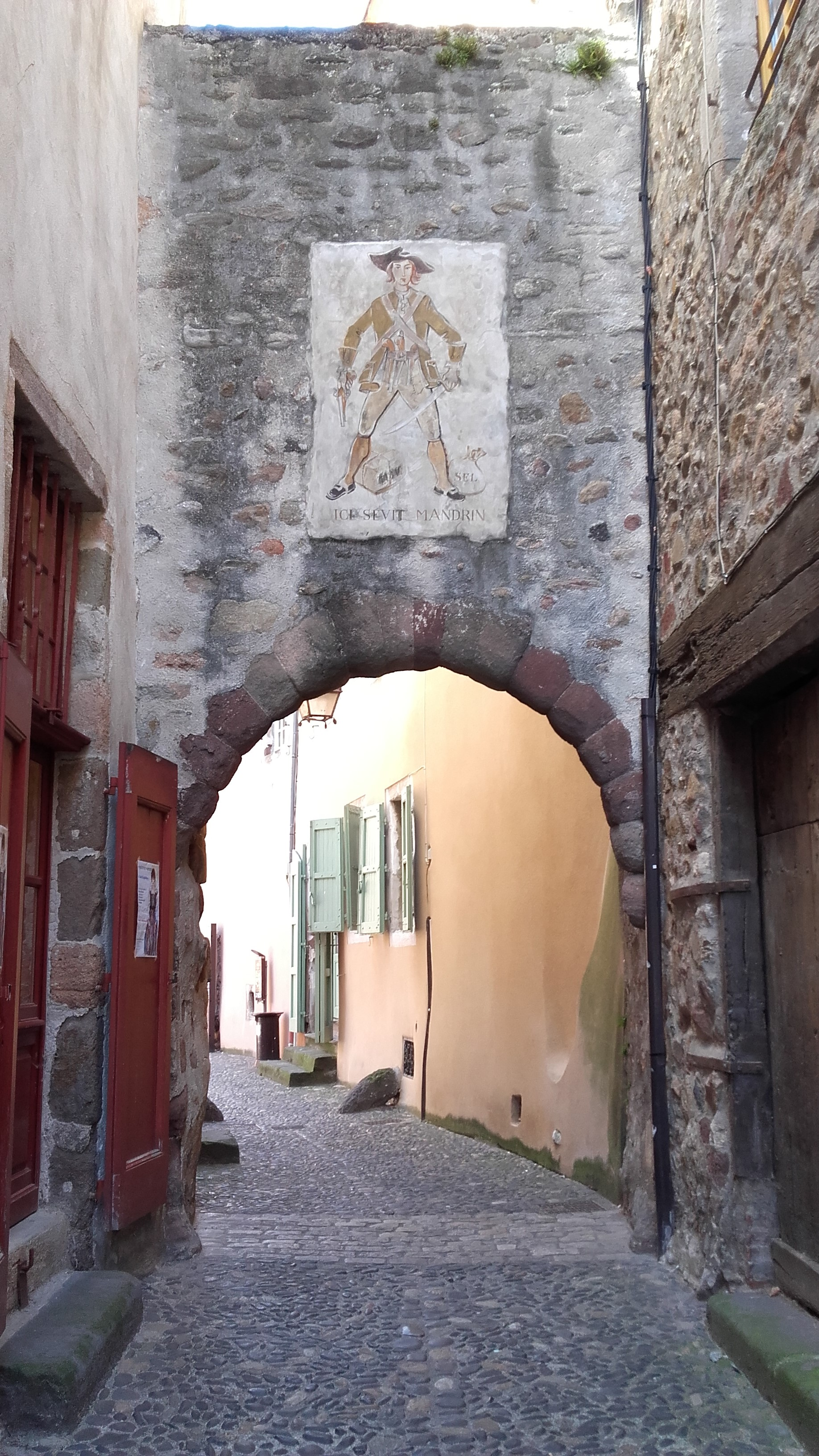
Mural painted on a passing named after Mandrin, in Brioude

=== Literature ===
- Mandrin is mentioned in Victor Hugo's novel Les Misérables, in reference to the argot of the low class society:

Slang, whether the public admit the fact or not has its syntax and its poetry. It is a language. Yes, by the deformity of certain terms, we recognize the fact that it was chewed by Mandrin, and by the splendor of certain metonymies, we feel that Villon spoke it.

— Victor Hugo, Les Misérables

=== Cinema and TV ===
- Mandrin, a 1924 silent film
- Mandrin, 1st period : The Liberator (1948)
- Mandrin, 2nd period : Tragedy of a Century (1948)
- The Adventures of Mandrin (1952)
- Mandrin (1962, from a book by Arthur Bernède)
- Mandrin, Gentleman robber (1971, TV series in 6 episodes)
- Les Chants de Mandrin (2011), "The Ballads of Mandrin" (French film; trailer) (in French)

=== Expositions ===
- In the Musée dauphinois in Grenoble, an exposition named Louis Mandrin, wrongdoer or bandit with a good heart? took place from 13 May 2005 to 27 March 2006.
- At the Museum of Bordeaux

=== Mandrin namesakes ===
In 2002, a Grenoble brewery named a walnut-flavored beer after Mandrin. Today, the Brasserie artisanale du Dauphiné makes 6 different beers under that brand.
