= Il Richiamo del ghiacciaio =

- Release date: 1952
- Country: Italy
- Language: Italian

Il Richiamo del ghiacciaio is a 1952 Italian film.
