= Tutto il mondo ride =

Italian film

- Directed by: Ignazio Ferronetti
- Written by: Ignazio Ferronetti
- Starring: Charlie Chaplin, Aldo Fabrizi, Ettore Petrolini, Stan Laurel & Oliver Hardy, Harold Lloyd
- Distributed by: NAR, General Video, San Paolo Audiovisivi
- Release date: 1952
- Running time: 100 minutes
- Country: Italy
- Language: Italian

Tutto il mondo ride is a 1952 Italian film.

== Description ==
The film is an anthology of old comedies of the silent and sound era of comedy films of the early 1900s. Laurel and Hardy also take part in quato mounting film and short film credits are taken from their filmography: Come Clean and Helpmates; with the original Italian dubbing of Mauro Zambuto (Laurel) and Alberto Sordi (Hardy).
