= Gamba di legno =

- Release date: 1952
- Country: Italy
- Language: Italian

Gamba di legno is a 1952 Italian film.
