= Serenata amara =

- Directed by: Pino Mercanti
- Starring: Claudio Villa
- Cinematography: Renato Del Frate
- Music by: Gino Filippini
- Release date: 1952
- Country: Italy
- Language: Italian

Serenata amara (t.l. Bitter serenade) is a 1952 Italian musical melodrama film.

== Plot ==
The film tells a story of friendship between two boxers, Mario (Claudio Villa) and Fabrizio (Walter Santesso), disturbed by their attraction for the same young girl, Anna Maria (Liliana Bonfatti).

== Cast ==
- Claudio Villa as Mario
- Liliana Bonfatti as Anna Maria
- Walter Santesso as Fabrizio
- Giovanna Pala as Angela
- Gianni Rizzo as Giuseppe
- Roberto Colangeli as Massimo
- Umberto Spadaro as Music Teacher
- Ave Ninchi as Mario's Mother
- Carlo Sposito
- Nino Pavese
