= Meglio di ieri =

- Directed by: Romolo Marcellini
- Release date: 1952
- Country: Italy
- Language: Italian

Meglio di ieri is a 1952 Italian documentary film.
