= The Adventures of Mandrin =

- American poster
- Directed by: Mario Soldati
- Written by: Giorgio Bassani; Augusto Frassinetti; Vittorio Nino Novarese; Mario Soldati
- Produced by: Jacques Bar; Niccolò Theodoli
- Starring: Raf Vallone; Silvana Pampanini; Jacques Castelot
- Cinematography: Mario Montuori
- Edited by: Roberto Cinquini
- Music by: Mario Nascimbene
- Production companies: Cormoran Films; Industrie Cinematografiche Sociali
- Distributed by: Sonofilm; Republic Pictures (US)
- Release date: 8 March 1952
- Running time: 102 minutes
- Countries: France; Italy
- Language: Italian

The Adventures of Mandrin (Italian: Le Avventure di Mandrin) is a 1952 French-Italian historical adventure film directed by Mario Soldati and starring Raf Vallone, Silvana Pampanini and Jacques Castelot. It was released under a variety of alternative titles including Don Juan's Night of Love in America and The Affair of Madame Pompadour in Britain.

The film's sets were designed by the art director Guido Fiorini. It was shot at the Farnesina Studios of Titanus in Rome. On its release it earned around 194 million lira at the Italian box office.

== Synopsis ==
During the reign of Louis XV of France, the smuggler and brigand Louis Mandrin leads defiance of the government's harsh tax-collecting efforts.

== Cast ==
- Raf Vallone as Mandrin
- Jacques Castelot as Baron de Villemure
- Silvana Pampanini as Rosetta
- Michèle Philippe as Marquise de Maubricourt
- Roland Armontel as Marchese di Montbricourt
- Gualtiero Tumiati as Prince Guido
- Vinicio Sofia as Stefano Vernet
- Giulio Donnini as Monsieur Pierre
- Alberto Rabagliati as Behisar
- Nietta Zocchi as Dama di compagnia
- Michele Malaspina
- Pina Piovani

== Bibliography ==
- Chiti, Roberto & Poppi, Roberto. Dizionario del cinema italiano: Dal 1945 al 1959. Gremese Editore, 1991.
- Kinnard, Roy & Crnkovich, Tony . Italian Sword and Sandal Films, 1908–1990. McFarland, 2017.
