= Giulio Donnini =

Italian film actor (1923–2001)

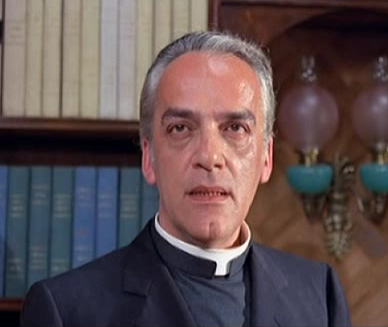
- Donnini in La minorenne (1974)
- Born: 17 February 1923; Milan, Italy
- Died: 22 May 2001 (aged 78); Rome, Italy
- Years active: 1946–1995

Giulio Donnini (17 February 1923 – 22 May 2001) was an Italian film actor.

== Life and career ==
Born in Milan, Donnini made his film debut in 1946, in Giacomo Gentilomo's Teheran. He got his first mayor role two years later, playing the epileptic murderer Smerdjakov in Gentilomo's The Brothers Karamazov. From then Donnini specialized in playing negative and often violent characters, being mainly cast in supporting roles. He was also very active on stage.

Donnini died in Rome on 22 May 2001, at the age of 78.

== Selected filmography ==
- The Brothers Karamazov (1947)
- Love and Poison (1950)
- The Transporter (1950)
- O.K. Nerone (1951)
- Tragic Spell (1951)
- The Rival of the Empress (1951)
- The Adventures of Mandrin (1952)
- Shadows Over Trieste (1952)
- It's Never Too Late (1953)
- Beat the Devil (1953) as Administrator
- Frine, Courtesan of Orient (1953)
- Barrier of the Law (1954)
- Disowned (1954)
- Vendicata! (1955)
- The Dragon's Blood (1957)
- Slave Women of Corinth (1958)
- Dubrowsky (1959)
- Messalina (1960)
- The Conqueror of the Orient (1960)
- Robin Hood and the Pirates (1960)
- Caesar the Conqueror (1962)
- Venus Against the Son of Hercules (1962)
- Hercules Against the Sons of the Sun (1964)
- Samson vs. the Giant King (1964)
- Terror of the Steppes (1964)
- The Almost Perfect Crime (1966)
- El Greco (1966)
- L'Odissea (1968)
- La morte ha fatto l'uovo (1968)
- La minorenne (1974)
- Le comiche 2 (1991)
