= Non ho paura di vivere =

- Release date: 1952
- Country: Italy
- Language: Italian

Non ho paura di vivere is a 1952 Italian film.
