= Il Mercato delle facce =

- Release date: 1952
- Country: Italy
- Language: Italian

Il Mercato delle facce is a 1952 Italian film.
