= Brothers of Italy (film) =

1952 film

- Directed by: Fausto Saraceni
- Written by: Ennio De Concini; Italo Japichino
- Produced by: Dino De Laurentiis; Carlo Ponti
- Starring: Ettore Manni; Paul Muller; Olga Solbelli
- Cinematography: Tonino Delli Colli
- Edited by: Giuliana Attenni
- Music by: Armando Trovajoli
- Production companies: Excelsa Film; Ponti-De Laurentiis Cinematografica
- Distributed by: Minerva Film
- Release date: 30 December 1952
- Running time: 103 minutes
- Country: Italy
- Language: Italian

Brothers of Italy (Italian: Fratelli d'Italia) is a 1952 Italian biographical war film directed by Fausto Saraceni and starring Ettore Manni, Paul Muller and Olga Solbelli. It depicts real life events of Austrian-born Italian irredentist and sailor Nazario Sauro. The film's sets were designed by the art director Piero Filippone.

== Cast ==
- Ettore Manni as Il capitano Nazario Sauro
- Olga Solbelli as Anna Sauro
- Paul Muller as Luigi Staffi
- Mario Ferrari as Comandante nave italiana
- Ennio Girolami as Sergio
- Carlo Hintermann as Tenente Sarnich
- Fanny Landini as Nina
- Lili Cerasoli as Maria Sauro
- Nino Marchetti as Comandante del sommergibile Pullino
- Mario Feliciani as Cesare Battisti
- Marc Lawrence as Il capitano March
- Riccardo Garrone as Dazé

== Bibliography ==
- Chiti, Roberto & Poppi, Roberto. Dizionario del cinema italiano: Dal 1945 al 1959. Gremese Editore, 1991.
