= Salviamo la montagna muore =

- Directed by: Piero Nelli
- Release date: 1952
- Country: Italy
- Language: Italian

Salviamo la montagna muore is a 1952 Italian film directed by Piero Nelli.
