= Piccolo cabotaggio pittorico =

- Release date: 1952
- Country: Italy
- Language: Italian

Piccolo cabotaggio pittorico is a 1952 Italian film.
