= Er fattaccio =

- Release date: 1952
- Country: Italy
- Language: Italian

Er fattaccio is a 1952 Italian film.

== Plot ==
In Trastevere, in Vicolo del Moro, Sora Emma, a widow lives with her two children: Bruno, the eldest, is a carter; Gigi, the youngest, is an apprentice to a watchmaker, Sor Venanzio. Of the two, Bruno is the more willing, disciplined and affectionate with his mother. Gigi loves to have fun, neglects work by attending idle companies and, despite being engaged, runs after every girl. When he meets Lulu, a singer, he becomes her lover and for her he commits a theft in the shop where he works. Sor Venanzio notices the theft and Gigi, to compensate him, steals his mother's savings. Lulu brings Gigi into the gang of Lemme Lemme, her protector, but one evening he has him put out by the latter and Gigi goes on a rampage. At home, she mistreats her mother who, aware of the theft suffered, she suffers for not being able to lead him back on the right path and silently suffers her abuses. One evening, Bruno surprises his brother during yet another scene with his mother and the two come to blows; Bruno is wounded by Gigi with a knife and Sora Emma, at the sight of her blood, faints and dies. Bruno, immobilized his brother's right hand, forces him to hit himself and then goes to turn himself in.
