= Pinne e arpioni =

- Directed by: Folco Quilici
- Release date: 1952
- Country: Italy
- Language: Italian

Pinne e arpioni is a 1952 Italian documentary film by Folco Quilici.
