= Gli undici moschettieri =

Gli Undici moschettieri
- Directed by: Ennio De Concini; Fausto Saraceni
- Produced by: Dino De Laurentiis; Carlo Ponti
- Music by: Armando Trovajoli
- Release date: 1952
- Country: Italy
- Language: Italian

Gli Undici moschettieri is a 1952 Italian documentary film directed by Ennio De Concini and Fausto Saraceni.

== Cast ==
- Silvio Piola: himself
- Giuseppe Meazza: himself
- Vittorio Pozzo: himself
- Fulvio Bernardini: himself
- Renzo De Vecchi: himself
