= Fausto Saraceni =

Italian film producer

- Born: 1 August 1920; Rome, Lazio, Italy
- Died: 21 June 2000 (aged 79); Rome, Lazio, Italy
- Occupations: Director, Producer
- Years active: 1952–1978 (film)

Fausto Saraceni (1920–2000) was an Italian film producer and director. He was married to the actress Teresa Pellati. He produced several comedies starring Alberto Sordi, and worked frequently with Dino De Laurentiis.

== Selected filmography ==
- Brothers of Italy (1952)
- Gli undici moschettieri (1952)
- War and Peace (1956)
- Anyone Can Play (1968)
- Metello (1970)
- A Girl in Australia (1971)
- In Prison Awaiting Trial (1971)
- A Common Sense of Modesty (1976)
- Strange Occasion (1976)
- Professor Kranz tedesco di Germania (1978)

== Bibliography ==
- Chiti, Roberto & Poppi, Roberto. Dizionario del cinema italiano: Dal 1945 al 1959. Gremese Editore, 1991.
- Kezich, Tulio & Levantesi, Alessandra. Dino: The Life and the Films of Dino De Laurentiis. Miramax Books, 2004.
- Moore, Gene M. Conrad on Film. Cambridge University Press, 1997.
