= Adriana Innocenti =

Italian actress and voice actress

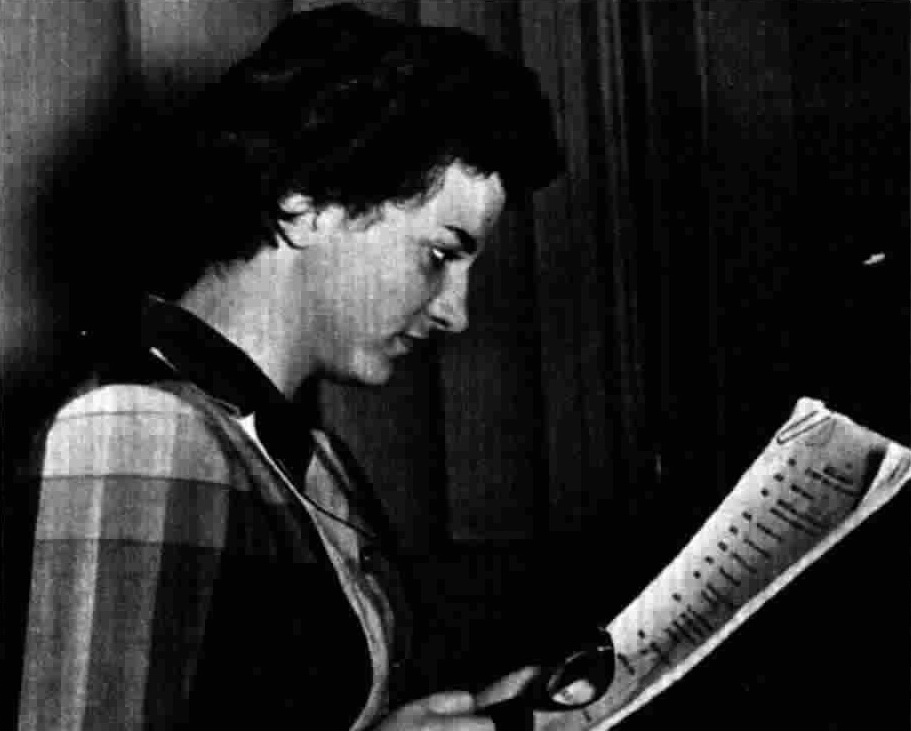
- Born: 16 October 1926; Portico e San Benedetto, Forlì-Cesena, Kingdom of Italy
- Died: 4 March 2016 (aged 89); Turin, Italy
- Occupation: Actress

Adriana Innocenti (16 October 1926 – 4 March 2016) was an Italian actress and voice actress.

== Life and career ==
Born in Portico e San Benedetto, Italy, Innocenti formed at the Silvio d'Amico National Academy of Dramatic Arts in Rome and then made her professional debut on stage in 1947, with the theatrical company held by Annibale Ninchi. She worked extensively in the Giulio Donadio's stage company, as well as at the Piccolo Teatro in Milan and at the Teatro Stabile in Turin. On television, she had an intense career since 1958, alternating between main and supporting roles in TV-movies and series. She was also very active as a voice actress in radio dramas. Her film career was less significant, with Innocenti only debuting at a mature age and only cast in character roles.
