= Giuseppe Lombardi =

Italian military officer (1886–1978)

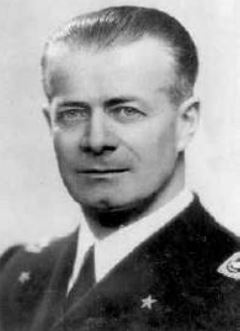
- Born: 11 May 1886; Dronero, Italy
- Died: 25 March 1978 (aged 91); Rome, Italy
- Military career
- Allegiance: Kingdom of Italy
- Branch: Regia Marina
- Service years: 1905–1946
- Rank: Ammiraglio di Divisione (Vice Admiral)
- Commands: Luca Tarigo (destroyer); Quarto (scout cruiser); High Naval Command Far East; Bari (light cruiser); Bolzano (heavy cruiser); Emanuele Filiberto Duca d'Aosta (light cruiser); La Spezia Naval Base; Aegean Sea (Dodecanese) Naval Command; Special Information Service; 8th Naval Division; Naval Command Libya; Naval Command Western Greece
- Conflicts: Italo-Turkish War; World War I; Adriatic Campaign; Corfu incident; World War II; Battle of the Mediterranean; Operation Agreement; Operation Achse
- Awards: Silver Medal of Military Valor; War Cross for Military Valor; Military Order of Savoy

Giuseppe (11 May 1886 – 25 March 1978) was an Italian admiral during World War II.

== Early life and career ==
Born in Dronero, Cuneo province, on 11 May 1886, Lombardi entered the Italian Naval Academy of Livorno in 1905 and graduated three years later with the rank of ensign. With the rank of sub-lieutenant, he took part in the Italo-Turkish War, distinguishing himself in Tripoli, where he fought in a landing company of the battleship Sicilia, receiving a Silver Medal of Military Valor.

During World War I Lombardi, with the rank of lieutenant, was executive officer of the destroyer Francesco Stocco; during the war he received a War Cross for Military Valor. In 1923, after becoming lieutenant commander, he participated in the landing at Corfu during the crisis between Italy and Greece. Later, having been promoted to commander, he was commanding officer of the destroyer Luca Tarigo and then, from 1932 to 1935, he served as naval attaché in Spain and Portugal.

After promotion to captain, Lombardi became commander of the scout cruiser Quarto and of the Naval High Command Far East. He then commanded the cruiser Bari in Red Sea and later, between 1935 and 1937, the heavy cruiser Bolzano and the light cruiser Emanuele Filiberto Duca d'Aosta. In 1938, he was promoted to rear admiral and appointed commander of the La Spezia Naval Base; he then became commander of the naval forces in Dodecanese, with headquarters in Rhodes.

== World War II ==
Having been repatriated in 1940, Lombardi was promoted to vice admiral when Italy had already entered World War II. For about a year, he headed the intelligence service of Regia Marina (Servizio Informazioni Segrete, SIS); he was then placed in command of the 8th Naval Division, participating in several combat missions in the Mediterranean. In November 1941, his flagship, the light cruiser Luigi di Savoia Duca degli Abruzzi, was torpedoed and badly damaged by British torpedo bombers during an escort mission to Libya.

In March 1942, Lombardi was appointed Superior Naval Commander in Libya, with headquarters in Tobruk. In this role, between 13 and 14 September 1942, he directed the Italian-German resistance to a British assault aimed at temporarily occupying Tobruk, known as Operation Agreement; the forces under his command repulsed all attacks by land and by sea, sealing the complete failure of "Agreement" and inflicting on the attackers almost 1,400 casualties at a cost of 66 killed and wounded. For this feat, Lombardi was awarded the Knight's Cross of the Military Order of Savoy.

In August 1943, he was given command of the Western Greece Naval Command (Marimorea), headquartered in Patras. After 8 September 1943 armistice, while the German forces moved to occupy Patras and the surrounding area, Lombardi ordered the departure of all vessels in the ports under his jurisdiction, allowing nearly all of them to safely reach Italy; then, faced with the choice of collaborating with the Germans and joining the Republic of Salò, he refused any collaboration, along with all his subordinates. He was then declared a prisoner of war and sent to a POW camp in Schokken, in Poland. He remained there until January 1945, when he was freed by the advancing Red Army, being then repatriated in 1946.

== Later life ==
In 1946, Lombardi was placed in auxiliary; he would be promoted to full admiral in 1952. He then moved to Argentina, where he served as consul of Italy in Tucuman; he returned to Italy in 1957. He died in Rome on 25 March 1978, aged 91.
