= La stazione (1952 film) =

- Release date: 1952
- Country: Italy
- Language: Italian

La stazione is a 1952 Italian documentary film directed by Valerio Zurlini.
