= RAI2 =

Protein-coding gene in the species Homo sapiens

Identifiers
- Aliases: RAI2, retinoic acid induced 2
- External IDs: OMIM: 300217; MGI: 1344378; HomoloGene: 11034; GeneCards: RAI2; OMA:RAI2 - orthologs

Gene location (Human)
Chr.	X chromosome (human)
Band	Xp22.13	Start	17,800,049 bp
Band	Xp22.13	End	17,861,337 bp

Gene location (Mouse)
Chr.	X chromosome (mouse)
Band	X|X F4	Start	160,500,065 bp
Band	X|X F4	End	160,562,492 bp
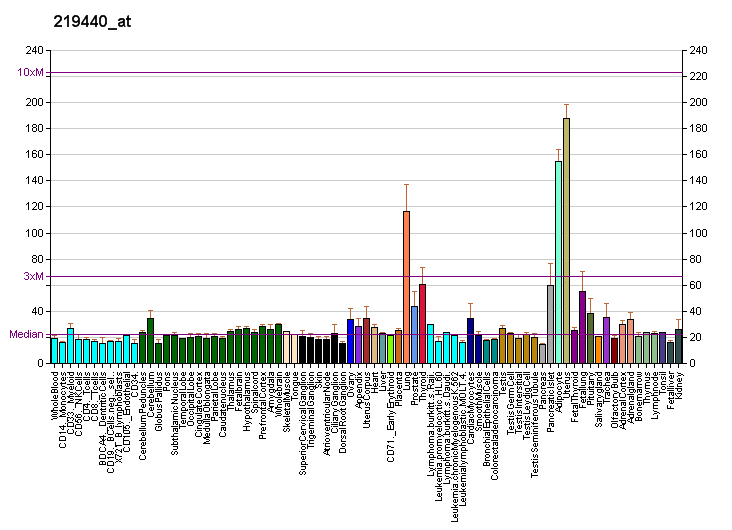
RNA expression pattern
Bgee	Human / Mouse (ortholog); Top expressed in: left uterine tube; urethra; right lung; canal of the cervix; body of uterus; saphenous vein; gastric mucosa; left ovary; vena cava; decidua / Top expressed in: myocardium of ventricle; intercostal muscle; cumulus cell; supraoptic nucleus; pineal gland; aortic valve; muscle of thigh; islet of Langerhans; Rostral migratory stream; ganglionic eminence; More reference expression data
BioGPS	More reference expression data
Gene ontology
Molecular function	protein binding; molecular function
Cellular component	cellular component
Biological process	embryo development ending in birth or egg hatching
Sources:Amigo / QuickGO
Orthologs
Species	Human	Mouse
Entrez	10742	24004
Ensembl	ENSG00000131831	ENSMUSG00000043518
UniProt	Q9Y5P3	Q9QVY8
RefSeq (mRNA)	NM_001172732; NM_001172739; NM_001172743; NM_021785	NM_001103367; NM_198409
RefSeq (protein)	NP_001166203; NP_001166210; NP_001166214; NP_068557; NP_001166210.1 NP_001166214.1; NP_068557.3	NP_001096837; NP_940801
Location (UCSC)	Chr X: 17.8 – 17.86 Mb	Chr X: 160.5 – 160.56 Mb
PubMed search
- Wikidata
View/Edit Human	View/Edit Mouse

Retinoic acid-induced protein 2 is a protein that in humans is encoded by the RAI2 gene.

Retinoic acid plays a critical role in development, cellular growth, and differentiation. The specific function of this intronless, retinoic acid-induced gene has not yet been determined; however, it has been suggested to play a role in development. Localization of this gene designates it to be a candidate for diseases such as Nance-Horan syndrome, sensorineural deafness, non-specific X-linked mental retardation, oral-facial-digital syndrome, and Fried syndrome.
