= Luciano Emmer =

Italian film director and screenwriter

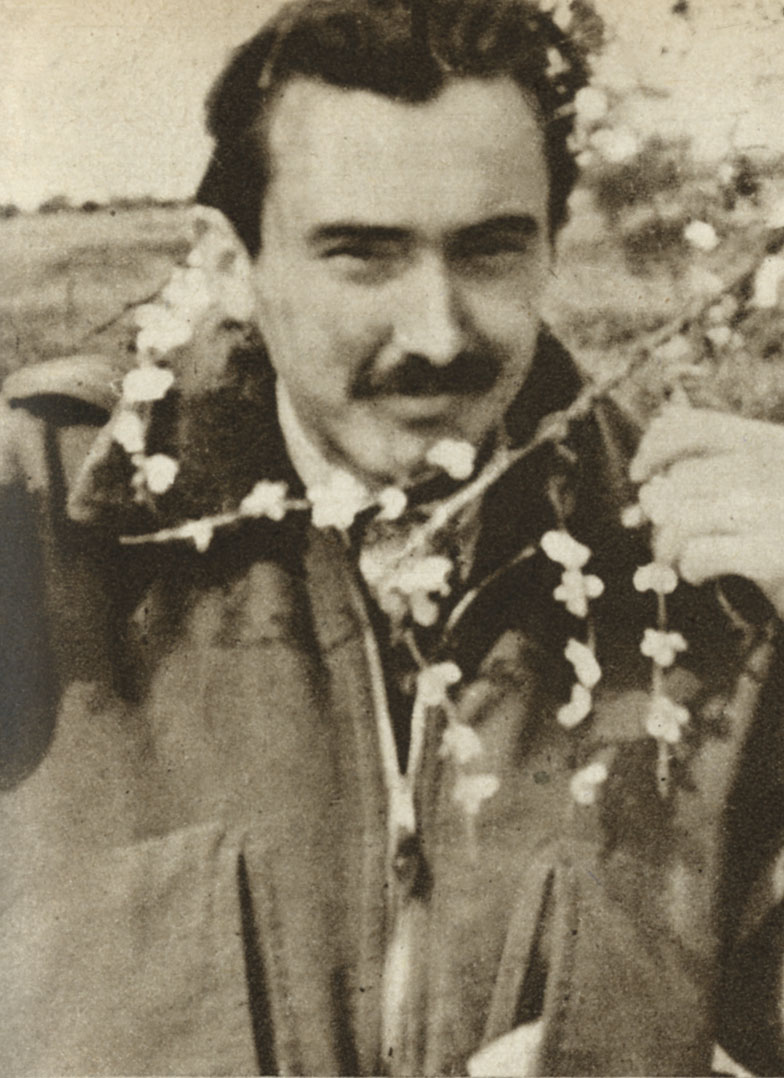
- Born: 19 January 1918; Milan, Italy
- Died: 16 September 2009 (aged 91); Rome, Italy
- Years active: 1941–2009

Luciano Emmer (19 January 1918 – 16 September 2009) was an Italian film director. He was born in Milan, but most of his childhood lived in Venice.

He started as filmmaker at filming Giotto's frescoes in Padua in 1938. Screenwriter Sergio Amidei, found the finance for Emmer to make a feature about Romans spending a Sunday in August on the beach at Ostia. He won a Golden Globe in 1951 for Pictura: An Adventure in Art. He has directed more documentaries than fiction pictures, most notably Domenica d'agosto and the romance-comedy-drama Three Girls from Rome.

Luciano Emmer started his career as a filmmaker working with Enrico Gras. He founded the production company Dolomiti Film and directed several documentaries. In 1949, Emmer produced his first feature film Dimanche d'August (1950) with Marcello Mastroianni. Also with Mastroianni, the following year he made Paris is always Paris (1951).

In the 1950s, Luciano Emmer made advertising films meanwhile he continued with his documentary work. He was labeled as an example of the Italian pink neorealism. In 1956, Emmer directed with Robert Enrico To Each His Own Paradise. After The Girl in the Window (1961), a social drama with Marina Vlady and Lino Ventura, he turned to television. He made his return to the cinema with Enough! I make a movie.

Luciano Emmer was the father of mathematician, writer and director Michele Emmer and of the director David Emmer.

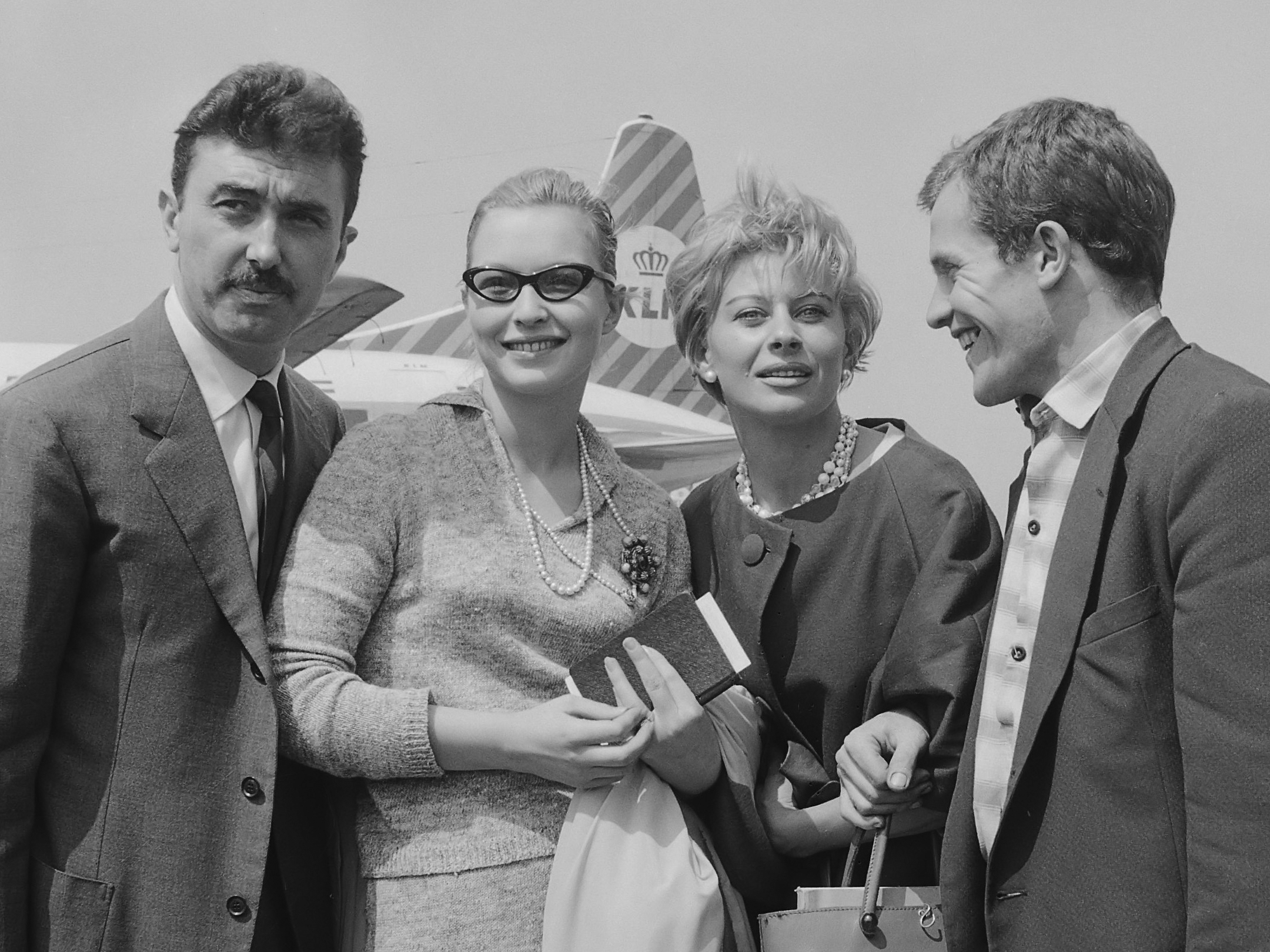
Luciano Emmer, Marina Vlady, Magali Noël, and Bernard Fresson (1 June 1960)

== Selected filmography ==
- 1938 Racconto di un affresco (documentary)
- 1940 Il Paradiso terrestre (documentary)
- 1940 I disastri della guerra (documentary)
- 1949 Sunday in August
- 1951 Paris Is Always Paris
- 1951 Pictura: An Adventure in Art (co-director)
- 1952 Three Girls from Rome Le ragazze di Piazza di Spagna
- 1954 Incontrare Picasso (documentary)
- 1954 High School
- 1954 Gli eroi dell'Artide (documentary)
- 1954 Camilla
- 1955 Il bigamo
- 1957 Paradiso terrestre (documentary)
- 1957 Como e le sue ville (documentary)
- 1957 Il momento più bello
- 1961 Girl in the Window
- 1972 Cesare Zavattini e il "Campo di grano con corvi" di Van Gogh (documentary)
- 1990 Basta! Ci faccio un film
- 2001 Una lunga, lunga, lunga notte d'amore
- 2003 L'acqua... il fuoco
