= Cifariello =

Cifariello is an Italian surname. Notable people with the surname include:

- Antonio Cifariello (1930–1968), Italian actor
- Fabio Cifariello Ciardi (born 1960), Italian composer
- Filippo Cifariello (1864–1936), Italian sculptor
