= Ciccio Barbi =

Italian actor (1919–1992)

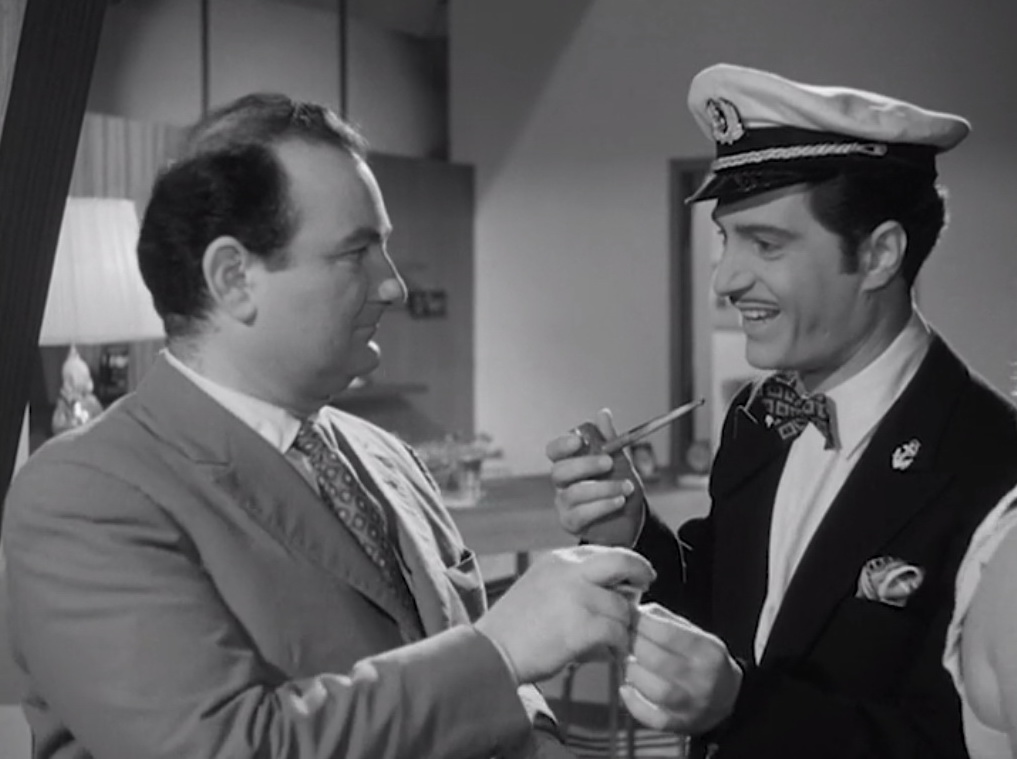
- Ciccio Barbi and Nino Manfredi in Time of Vacation (1956)
- Born: 19 January 1919; Trofarello, Italy
- Died: 26 November 1992 (aged 73)
- Years active: 1943–1977

Ciccio Barbi (19 January 1919 – 26 November 1992) was an Italian film actor.

== Selected filmography ==
- The Last Wagon (1943) - Young Friend of Toto (uncredited)
- Angelina (1947) - (uncredited)
- Auguri e figli maschi! (1951) - Vinicio Paciottini
- The Steamship Owner (1951) - Un alpino
- Finalmente libero! (1953) - Pasquale Galli
- Papà Pacifico (1954) - The Man identifying the ring
- Cuore di mamma (1954) - Police Commissioner Vargas
- Il seduttore (1954) - Ragionier Abele
- An American in Rome (1954) - Armando, impresario (uncredited)
- La campana di San Giusto (1954)
- A Hero of Our Times (1955) - Employee
- The Belle of Rome (1955) - Il parroco
- Accadde al penitenziario (1955) - Un automobilista in lite (uncredited)
- Bravissimo (1955) - Barbi - the Lawyer (uncredited)
- Roman Tales (1955) - The Plump Policeman near the Stadium (uncredited)
- Torna piccina mia! (1955) - Poliziotto
- Guardia, guardia scelta, brigadiere e maresciallo (1956) - French Tourist
- Nero's Weekend (1956) - Ancieto
- Tempo di villeggiatura (1956) - The Production Manager
- Porta un bacione a Firenze (1956) - Virgilio, il vigile
- Peccato di castità (1956)
- Parola di ladro (1957) - Impresario
- Nights of Cabiria (1957) - Man on the Stage (uncredited)
- The Love Specialist (1957) - The chubby 'Mangino' for the Aquila Contrada (uncredited)
- Amore e chiacchiere (Salviamo il panorama) (1958) - (uncredited)
- Il marito (1958) - Un amico
- Domenica è sempre domenica (1958) - The Priest
- Quando gli angeli piangono (1958) - L'allenatore di boxe
- Rascel marine (1958) - Marine
- L'amore nasce a Roma (1958) - padre di Lello
- Ricordati di Napoli (1958) - The 'Taxi Girls' Manager (uncredited)
- Il segreto delle rose (1958) - Davide
- Arriva la banda (1959)
- Fantasmi e ladri (1959)
- I tartassati (1959) - Il brigadiere Bardi
- Un canto nel deserto (1959)
- World of Miracles (1959) - Il commendatore Berbloni
- The Moralist (1959) - The Police Commissioner at 'Caracas'
- La cento chilometri (1959) - The Soaked Mason (uncredited)
- La nipote Sabella (1959) - The Stationmaster Nicola
- Juke box - Urli d'amore (1959)
- Audace colpo dei soliti ignoti (1959) - Carabiniere (uncredited)
- Simpatico mascalzone (1959) - Rutilio
- Roulotte e roulette (1959)
- Fountain of Trevi (1960) - Tax collector (uncredited)
- Everybody Go Home (1960) - Soldato
- Mariti in pericolo (1960) - Avvocato
- Ferragosto in bikini (1960) - Bonaccorsi assistant (uncredited)
- Girl with a Suitcase (1961) - Crosia
- Gli scontenti (1961) - Il medico
- 5 marines per 100 ragazze (1961) - Man firing Checco and Salvatore (uncredited)
- Gli attendenti (1961)
- Scandali al mare (1961) - Cuoco
- Le magnifiche 7 (1961)
- I magnifici tre (1961)
- Boccaccio '70 (1962) - Engineer in the Car (uncredited)
- Maciste il gladiatore più forte del mondo (1962)
- Carmen di Trastevere (1962) - Vincenzo's Accomplice in Black (uncredited)
- Il mio amico Benito (1962) - Sor Achille (uncredited)
- I soliti rapinatori a Milano (1963)
- Vino, whisky e acqua salata (1963)
- Los dinamiteros (1964) - Martínez - vendedor de lencería
- The Girl Who Couldn't Say No (1969) - Passenger on Train
- Orazi e curiazi 3-2 (1977) - Curiazio (uncredited) (final film role)
