= Graziosi =

Graziosi is a surname. Notable people with the surname include:

- Barbara Graziosi, Italian classicist
- Giuseppe Graziosi (1879–1942), Italian painter, sculptor, and engraver
- Franco Graziosi (1929–2021), Italian actor
- Paolo Graziosi (1940–2022), Italian actor
