= My Love Is Called Margarita =

- Directed by: Tito Fernández
- Written by: Vicente Escrivá
- Produced by: M.E. Gamundi
- Starring: Mercedes Alonso; Antonio Cifariello; Manuel Zarzo
- Cinematography: José F. Aguayo
- Edited by: José Antonio Rojo
- Music by: José Pagán; Antonio Ramírez Ángel
- Production company: Aspa Producciones Cinematográficas
- Distributed by: Chamartín
- Release date: 31 August 1961
- Running time: 94 minutes
- Country: Spain
- Language: Spanish

My Love Is Called Margarita (Spanish: Margarita se llama mi amor) is a 1961 Spanish romantic comedy film directed by Tito Fernández and starring Mercedes Alonso, Antonio Cifariello and Manuel Zarzo.

== Cast ==
- Mercedes Alonso as Margarita Rodríguez Garcés
- Antonio Cifariello as Eduardo Heredia, professor de literatura
- Manuel Zarzo as Ignacio García Cruz 'Nacho'
- Isana Medel
- Ángel del Pozo
- Jesús Colomer as Desiderio Conesa Ortiz 'Desi'
- María Silva as Alumna que se sienta junto a Nacho
- Amparo Baró
- Óscar Cortina
- Carlos Piñar
- Ángel Álvarez as Manolo, hombre sentado en el baile
- José Torres
- Goyo Lebrero as Barrendero
- Paula Martel
- Aníbal Vela hijo
- Violeta Moreda
- Antonio Alfonso Vidal
- Aníbal Vela
- Víctor Valverde
- Carmen Rodríguez
- Juan José Sáez
- Antonio Moreno
- Manuel San Francisco
- Rosa Palomar
- Rufino Inglés
- Juan Cazalilla
- Junior
- Ena Sedeño
- Charito Trallero
- Marta Reves
- Rafael Ibáñez
- Rafael Hernández
- Joaquín Bergía
- Plácido Sequeiros
- José Isbert as Don Severino, professor de historia
- Jesús Tordesillas
- Montserrat Salvador
- Margot Cottens as Madre de Margarita
- Gisia Paradís as Nina
- José Luis Ozores as Felipe Gurriato Orbaneja 'Gurriato'
- Paco Romero

== Bibliography ==
- Bentley, Bernard. A Companion to Spanish Cinema. Boydell & Brewer, 2008.
