= Buonanotte... avvocato! =

- Directed by: Giorgio Bianchi
- Written by: Raffaello Matarazzo; Ruggero Maccari; Alberto Sordi; Ettore Scola; Giovanni Grimaldi; Felice Zappulla
- Cinematography: Mario Bava
- Music by: Carlo Innocenzi
- Release date: 1955
- Running time: 71 minutes
- Country: Italy
- Language: Italian

Buonanotte... avvocato! (translation: Goodnight... Lawyer!) is a 1955 Italian comedy film directed by Giorgio Bianchi.

== Plot ==
Alberto Santi is a young lawyer who, although he loves his wife, often longingly thinks of his bachelor life. While his wife has gone to Rome for a conference of Catholic Women, a beautiful stranger named Bianca Maria suddenly swoops in his house, initiating a series of misunderstandings.

== Cast ==
- Alberto Sordi: Alberto Santi
- Mara Berni: Bianca Maria
- Giulietta Masina: Clara
- Andrea Checchi: Franco
- Vittorio Caprioli:Vittorio
- Tina Pica: Antonia the maid
- Turi Pandolfini: Bianca Maria's Grandpa
- Attilio Rapisarda: Alfonso Pirani
- Nanda Primavera: Donna Elvira
- Ignazio Balsamo: Inspector
- Pina Bottin: Marilina
- Natale Cirino: Bicini
