= Allow Me, Daddy! =

- Directed by: Mario Bonnard
- Written by: Giovanni Grimaldi; Ruggero Maccari; Fulvio Pazziloro; Ettore Scola
- Cinematography: Tino Santoni
- Music by: Giulio Bonnard
- Release date: 1956
- Running time: 90 minutes
- Country: Italy
- Language: Italian

Allow Me, Daddy! (Italian: Mi permette, babbo!) is a 1956 Italian comedy film directed by Mario Bonnard.

== Plot ==
Rodolfo, a young man with the ambitions of an opera singer in the bass register, does not work, gets up at midday and lives on the shoulders of his butchers in-laws, who keep his singing studies with a profiteer teacher. Finally, he is cornered by his father-in-law, who expects him to work, as a singer or with any other occupation. The teacher, for fear of losing the profit, arranges for Rodolfo to be hired for just one evening in the small part of Doctor Grenvil in La traviata.

Rodolfo, after having created problems in the rehearsals, executes, in general disapproval, the phrase "Consumption does not grant her but a few hours" lowering it by an octave, reaching low C, and furthermore, advancing to the proscenium while the curtain falls. He closes behind him, sings the phrase: «It's off!», not foreseen since, although present in the score, it is traditionally omitted. Everything happens: the other performers, the conductor and the theater director are indignant, while family and friends believe that he has been a great success. He will continue to study singing with the usual teacher, resuming life as always.

== Cast ==
- Aldo Fabrizi: Alessandro Biagi
- Alberto Sordi: Rodolfo Nardi
- Gina Amendola: Sora Mimma
- Marisa de Leza: Marina Biagi
- Sergio Raimondi: Tullio Biagi
- Franco Silva: Gigi Biagi
- Rita Giannuzzi: Elisa
- Turi Pandolfini: Granpa Giuseppe
- Achille Majeroni: Edmondo D'Aragona
- Pina Bottin: Rosa
- Riccardo Billi: Romoletto
- Paola Borboni: Madame Sonia Varonowska
- Elly Parvo: Fasòli
- Renato Navarrini: Manfredi
- Mario Passante: Director of the theatre
- Nerio Bernardi: Enzo Bernard
- Mino Doro: Santini
- Zoe Incrocci: Client
- Giulio Neri: Himself
- Afro Poli: Himself
- Rosanna Carteri: Herself
