= The Intruder (1956 film) =

- Directed by: Raffaello Matarazzo
- Written by: Raffaello Matarazzo; Piero Pierotti; Giovanna Soria; Silvio Zambaldi
- Story by: Silvio Zambaldi
- Starring: Amedeo Nazzari; Lea Padovani
- Cinematography: Tonino Delli Colli
- Edited by: Mario Serandrei
- Music by: Luigi Malatesta
- Release date: 18 May 1956
- Language: Italian

The Intruder (Italian: L'intrusa) is a 1956 Italian melodrama film written and directed by Raffaello Matarazzo and starring Amedeo Nazzari and Lea Padovani. It is loosely based on the stage drama La moglie del dottore by Silvio Zambaldi.

== Plot ==
Doctor Carlo Conti, proven by the fact that his girlfriend has just died, moves to a small seaside town for work. Here he saves a girl who attempted suicide by poisoning herself: the young woman is called Luisa Marcelli and is a teacher. Luisa's deep depression was caused by her love affair with the young engineer Alberto Serpieri, who abandoned her after having "dishonored" her. The girl became pregnant but her pregnancy had an unfortunate outcome with a miscarriage: the girl will no longer be able to have children. Carlo decides to marry the young woman more out of tenderness than out of true love. One day the doctor has to help a young pregnant lady who has suffered a car accident. The woman's husband rushes: it is the engineer Serpieri but Carlo, who never wanted to know the name of someone who made his partner suffer so much, does not know. Luisa would like to expel the man who ruined her life, abandoning her and preventing her from having children, but she does not do so through the intercession of Don Peppino, her parish priest, and Serpieri's declarations of sincere repentance. Disagreements arise between Luisa and Carlo but everything is resolved with reconciliation, the discovery of a deeper understanding and departure for a long journey.

== Cast ==
- Amedeo Nazzari as Dr. Carlo Conti
- Lea Padovani as Luisa Marcelli
- Andrea Checchi as Alberto Serpieri
- Cesco Baseggio as Don Peppino
- Pina Bottin as Bianca Serpieri
- Nico Pepe as Car Driver
- Nando Bruno as Maresciallo
- Rina Morelli as Rosa
- Piero Palermini as The Schoolteacher
- Amalia Pellegrini as Amalia
- Ada Colangeli as Caterina
- Franca Dominici as Bianca's Mother
- Oscar Andriani as The Major
- Paola Quattrini as Bettina
