= The Awakening (1956 film) =

- Directed by: Mario Camerini
- Written by: Cesare Zavattini
- Produced by: Sergio Pallavicini
- Starring: Anna Magnani; Antonio Cifariello
- Cinematography: Gianni Di Venanzo
- Edited by: Giuliana Attenni
- Music by: Angelo Francesco Lavagnino
- Distributed by: Columbia Pictures
- Release date: 18 October 1956
- Running time: 97 minutes
- Country: Italy
- Language: Italian

The Awakening (Italian: Suor Letizia, also known as When Angels Don't Fly) is a 1956 Italian comedy drama film directed by Mario Camerini. For this film Anna Magnani was awarded with her fourth Silver Ribbon for best actress.

== Plot ==
Sister Letizia, after having worked in African missions, is sent to close a convent on an island in the Gulf of Naples and, as soon as she arrives at her destination, she successfully undertakes to obtain good offers for the sale of the land of the convent. Here he meets a boy named Salvatore whom he grows fond of.

With great skill then, Sister Letizia goes beyond the task entrusted to her and undertakes to avoid the closure of the convent, and to reopen the kindergarten that the nuns once held; thus the sale is upset.

During his stay he becomes more and more fond of little Salvatore, fatherless, whose mother plans to get married for a second time. Her boyfriend, however, has no intention of taking Salvatore into the future family and the woman, cornered, eventually chooses to follow her boyfriend to Naples and leave Salvatore in the convent, entrusting him to Sister Letizia. From this moment on, Sister Letizia begins to feel less and less a nun and more and more a woman and a mother, eager to protect the little one she becomes attached to, to the point of neglecting her duties.

Sister Letizia's attachment to the child was noticed by the nuns, who respectfully point out to her how her preference is now evident to all the other children in the kindergarten. Called back to Rome, Sister Letizia decides to take Salvatore with her to the disapproval of her sisters. The night before leaving, however, the child clearly demonstrates to Sister Letizia that she could not replace her mother in her heart as, up until that moment, she had deluded herself that she could.

The next day Sister Letizia decides to put the good of the child before her own: so she goes to Naples instead of Rome, bringing the baby back to the mother and intervening energetically in front of the boyfriend, so that he accepts Salvatore in the new family.

== Cast ==
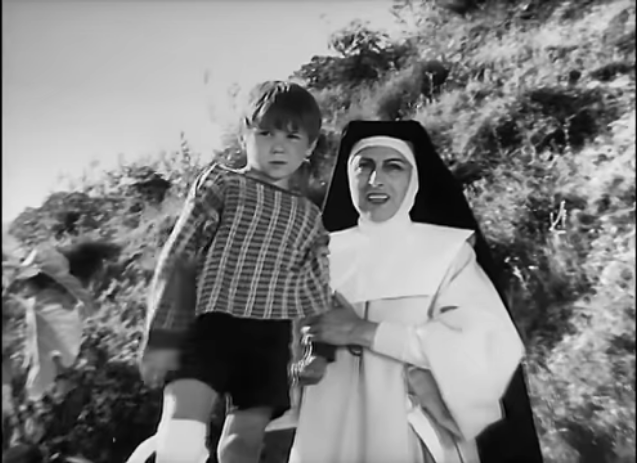
Salvatore and Sister Letizia

- Anna Magnani as Sister Letizia
- Eleonora Rossi Drago as Assunta
- Antonio Cifariello as Peppino
- Piero Boccia as Salvatore
- Bianca Doria as Concetta
- Luisa Rossi as Nun
