= Mara Berni =

Italian actress (born 1932)

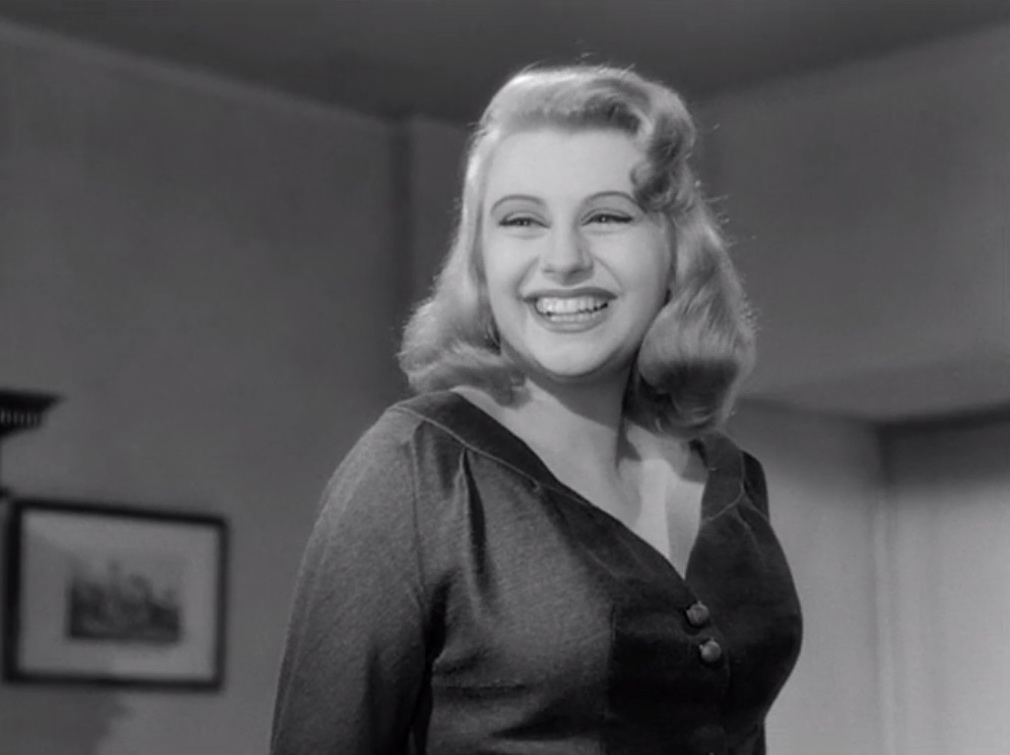
- Berni as Arnalda Bazzini in the movie It Happened at the Police Station (1954)
- Born: Mara Bernasconi; 12 June 1932 (age 93); Brunate, Como, Kingdom of Italy
- Occupation: Actress

Mara Berni (born 12 June 1932) is an Italian former stage, television and film actress.

== Life and career ==
Born in Brunate, Como as Mara Bernasconi, Berni debuted on stage as a child actress with the "Compagnia dei Piccoli" directed by Wanda Petrini. After studying piano and completing her studies, she enrolled the drama workshop held in Milan by actress Teresa Franchini. Berni then made her television debut as a presenter and got her first film role in 1952, playing a dancer in La tratta delle bianche. Her breakout came with Amore in città, in which she played the segment directed by Alberto Lattuada, then she got a personal critical success with the role of Bianca Maria in the Giorgio Bianchi's commedia all'italiana Buonanotte... avvocato!. Soon dissatisfied with cinema, which offered her roles related to her physical attractiveness rather than her acting skills, Berni during the years focused her career on television, in which she starred in a number of successful dramas and series, and on stage. She retired from showbusiness in the late 1980s, when she married Tarik Mamoud Rana, a businessman of Pakistani origin.

== Selected filmography ==
- Girls Marked Danger (1952)
- Love in the City (1953)
- Easy Years (1953)
- It Happened at the Police Station (1954)
- The Beach (1954)
- Il seduttore (1954)
- Buonanotte... avvocato! (1955)
- Andalusia Express (1956)
- The Moralist (1959)
- Juke box urli d'amore (1959)
- Checkerboard (1959)
- The Cossacks (1960)
- The Traffic Policeman (1960)
- Totò, Peppino e... la dolce vita (1961)
- Samson (1961)
- The Hours of Love (1962)
- Samson Against the Sheik (1962)
- The Fury of Hercules (1962)
