= Love in the City (1953 film) =

1953 Italian film

- Theatrical release poster
- L'amore in città
- Directed by: Carlo Lizzani; Michelangelo Antonioni; Dino Risi; Federico Fellini; Francesco Maselli; Cesare Zavattini; Alberto Lattuada
- Written by: Michelangelo Antonioni; Aldo Buzzi; Luigi Chiarini; Federico Fellini; Marco Ferreri; Alberto Lattuada; Luigi Malerba; Tullio Pinelli; Dino Risi; Luigi Vanzi; Vittorio Veltroni; Cesare Zavattini
- Produced by: Marco Ferreri; Riccardo Ghione; Cesare Zavattini
- Cinematography: Gianni Di Venanzo
- Edited by: Eraldo Da Roma
- Music by: Mario Nascimbene
- Production company: Faro Film
- Distributed by: IFE Releasing Corporation
- Release date: 27 November 1953 (Italy)
- Running time: 105 minutes
- Country: Italy
- Language: Italian

Love in the City (Italian: L'amore in città) is a 1953 Italian anthology film composed of six segments, each with its own director. The segments and filmmakers are: Paid Love (Carlo Lizzani), Attempted Suicide (Michelangelo Antonioni), Paradise for Three Hours (Dino Risi), Marriage Agency (Federico Fellini), Story of Caterina (Francesco Maselli and Cesare Zavattini), and Italians Stare (Alberto Lattuada).

== Synopsis ==
Paid Love

Filmed by Carlo Lizzani, seven Roman prostitutes of different age, some of them single mothers, tell their "stories of abandonment and deceit".

Attempted Suicide

Five young women, who have tried to commit suicide after being left by their partner, tell and re-enact their stories in front of Michelangelo Antonioni's camera.

Paradise for Three Hours

Dino Risi depicts the various encounters at a dance hall event which takes place every Sunday evening between 5 and 8.

Marriage Agency

Federico Fellini tells the story of a journalist doing research on marriage agencies, pretending to be looking for a wife for a rich friend who suffers from lycanthropy. To his surprise, he is presented with a prospect only a few days later.

Story of Caterina

Francesco Maselli and Cesare Zavattini follow Caterina, a young single mother ostracised by her parents, who is put on trial for abandoning her child which she can't feed.

Italians Stare

A sequence of men reacting to the passage of pretty women, filmed by Alberto Lattuada.

== Cast ==
Attempted Suicide

- Rita Josa
- Rosanna Carta
- Enrico Pelliccia
- Donatella Marrosu
- Paolo Pacetti
- Nella Bertuccioni
- Lilia Nardi
- Lena Rossi
- Maria Nobili

Paradise for Three Hours

- Luisella Boni

Marriage Agency

- Antonio Cifariello
- Livia Venturini
- Maresa Gallo
- Angela Pierro
- Rita Andreana
- Lia Natali
- Ilario Malaschini
- Cristina Grado
- Sue Ellen Blake
- Silvio Lillo

Story of Caterina

- Caterina Rigoglioso

Italians Stare

- Marisa Valenti
- Marco Ferreri
- Mario Bonotti
- Mara Berni
- Valeria Moriconi
- Giovanna Ralli
- Patrizia Lari
- Ugo Tognazzi
- Raimondo Vianello
- Edda Evangelisti
- Liliana Poggiali
- Maria Pia Trepaoli

== Production and release ==
Cesare Zavattini, Marco Ferreri and Riccardo Ghione intended Love in the City as the first issue in a series of a new journal published on celluloid, of which only this one was realised. The project was a critical and commercial failure on its first release, with French critic André Bazin being one of the few commentators to write a favorable review, appreciating the concept and the interviewed nonactors. Other critics questioned the film's authenticity, arguing that the people in front of the camera were obviously following directors' instructions, or attacked it for having the mother of the Story of Caterina segment re-enact the abandoning of her child. Initial export copies were missing Carlo Lizzani's segment on prostitution due to censorship issues.

Zavattini noted in retrospect that the film lacked a central idea and common perspective on the theme, partially owed to the fact that the filmmakers had only sporadic contact during production. The result was a film partly made in a documentary style, partly as a replication of reality, and, in the case of Federico Fellini, staged with professional actors. Michelangelo Antonioni, director of the second episode, later stated that he only participated in the film as a favour to one of its makers, and commented negatively on what he saw as insincerity on the side of his interviewees.

In 2014, Love in the City was released on Blu-ray by Raro Video.
