= Il seduttore =

- Directed by: Franco Rossi
- Written by: Leo Benvenuti; Ugo Guerra; Guido Leoni; Giorgio Prosperi; Raul Radice; Rodolfo Sonego; Franco Rossi; Diego Fabbri (play)
- Produced by: Franco Cristaldi
- Cinematography: Alfieri Canavero
- Music by: Carlo Innocenzi
- Release date: 1954
- Running time: 97 minutes
- Country: Italy
- Language: Italian

Il seduttore (translation: The Seducer) is a 1954 Italian comedy film directed by Franco Rossi. It was adapted from the play by Diego Fabbri.

== Plot ==
Alberto is forced to face his wife and his two lovers at the same time.

== Cast ==
- Alberto Sordi: Alberto
- Lea Padovani: Norma
- Lia Amanda: Natalina Spencer
- Jacqueline Pierreux: Jacqueline
- Denise Grey: Jacqueline's Mother
- Mino Doro: Commendatore
- Ciccio Barbi: Ragionier Abele
- Pina Bottin: Giulia
- Nino Vingelli: Onofrio
- Eva Vanicek:Alberto's Young Colleague
- Mara Berni: Blonde Colleague on the Train
- Riccardo Cucciolla: Racca
- Ennio Girolami: Singer
