= Ciao, ciao bambina! =

1959 Italian comedy film

- Directed by: Sergio Grieco
- Written by: Sandro Continenza; Giorgio Prosperi; Dino Verde
- Starring: Elsa Martinelli; Antonio Cifariello; Lorella De Luca
- Cinematography: Mario Montuori; Alfio Contini
- Music by: Piero Umiliani
- Release date: 1959
- Language: Italian

Ciao, ciao bambina! is a 1959 Italian comedy film directed by Sergio Grieco and starring Elsa Martinelli and Antonio Cifariello. It grossed 220 million lire at the Italian box office.

== Cast ==
- Elsa Martinelli as Diana
- Antonio Cifariello as Riccardo Branca
- Lorella De Luca as Gloria
- Riccardo Garrone as Guido Branca
- Luigi Pavese as Branca
- Elisa Cegani as Bice
- Carlo Romano as Remigio
- Aroldo Tieri as Train Conductor
- Andrea Aureli as Brigadiere
- Gianni Garko
- Gino Buzzanca
- Bruno Corelli
- Carlo Giuffrè
- Renato Malavasi
- Marco Tulli
