= Marriage (1954 film) =

- Directed by: Antonio Petrucci
- Written by: Anton Chekhov (play); Sandro Continenza; Luigi Filippo D'Amico; Antonio Petrucci; Ermanno Contini; Vittorio Veltroni
- Produced by: Paolo Moffa
- Starring: Vittorio De Sica; Silvana Pampanini; Alberto Sordi; Valentina Cortese
- Cinematography: Václav Vích
- Edited by: Eraldo Da Roma
- Music by: Angelo Francesco Lavagnino
- Production companies: Film Costellazione Produzione; Zebra Films
- Distributed by: CEI Incom
- Release date: 25 February 1954
- Running time: 87 minutes
- Country: Italy
- Language: Italian

Marriage (Italian: Il matrimonio) is a 1954 Italian historical comedy film directed by Antonio Petrucci and starring Vittorio De Sica, Silvana Pampanini and Alberto Sordi. It consists of three segments, based on three stage plays by Anton Chekhov.

It was shot at the Cinecittà Studios in Rome. The film's sets were designed by the art director Gianni Polidori.

== Plot ==
Grisha Smirnov (Vittorio De Sica) courts Elena (Silvana Pampanini) with almost fatal results.

== Cast ==
- Vittorio De Sica as Grisha Smirnov
- Silvana Pampanini as Elena Ivanovna Popova
- Alberto Sordi as Ivan Vassilievic Lomov
- Valentina Cortese as Natalia
- Renato Rascel as Revunov
- Guglielmo Barnabò as Stefan Ciubucov
- Bice Valori as Levatrice
- Ave Ninchi as Nastasia
- Carlo Sposito as Epaminonda Massinovich
- Franco Scandurra as Andrej Andrejevich Niunin
- Pina Bottin as Daschenka, la sposa
- Nino Milano as Kharlampy Marshmallopolis, il mercante greco
- Vittorina Benvenuti as Maria, la domestica della vedova Popova
- Bruno Smith as Luca, il cocchiere
- Attilio Martella as Ivan Mihailovich, il telegrafista
- Gustavo Serena as Scingalov, il padre della sposa
- Pietro De Santis as Vanya, il servo della vedova Popova
