= Giuseppe Graziosi =

Italian painter, sculptor and engraver (1879–1942)

Giuseppe Graziosi (Savignano sul Panaro, January 25, 1879 - Florence, July 2, 1942) was an Italian sculptor, painter and graphic designer.

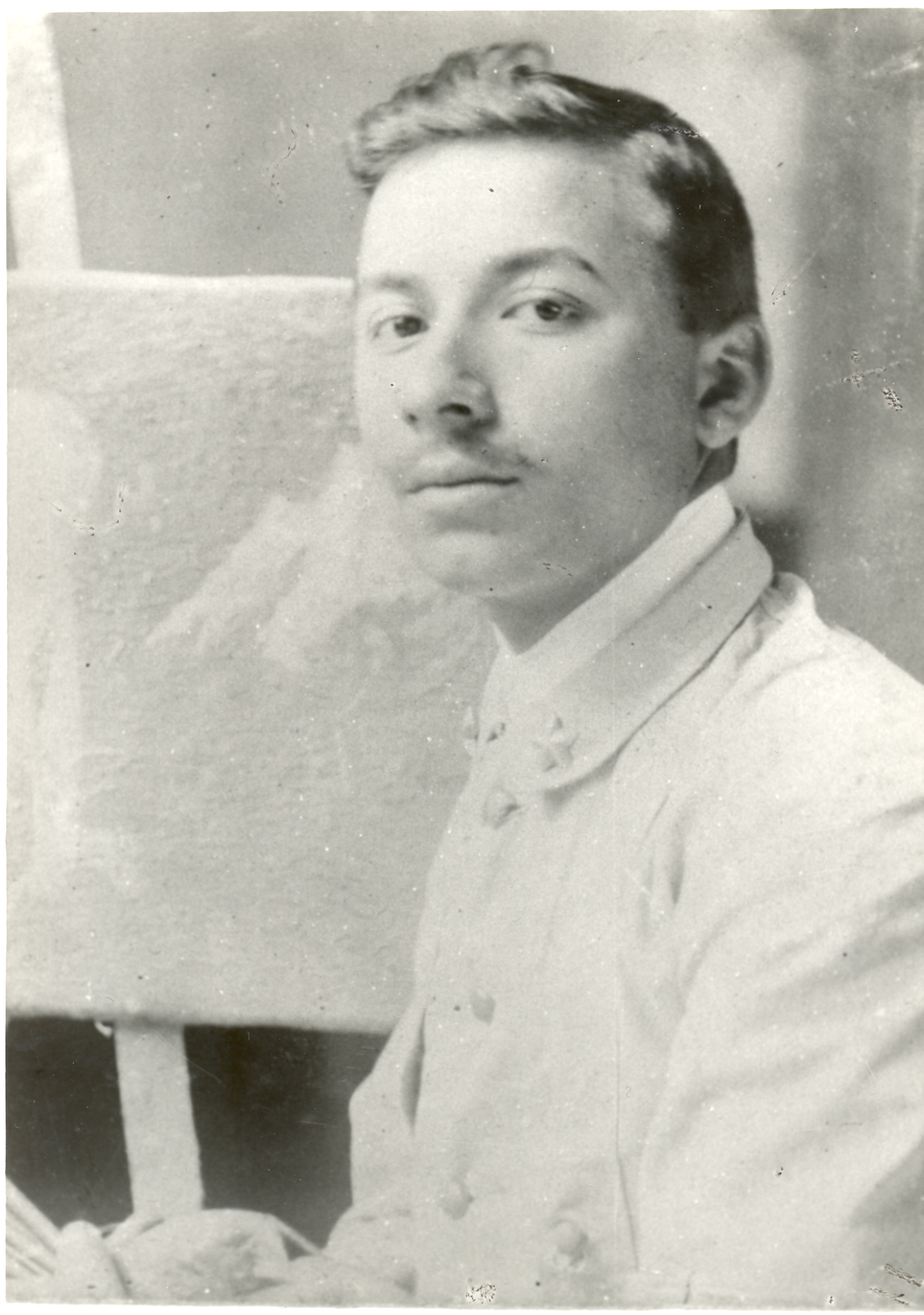
Giuseppe Graziosi, self-portrait

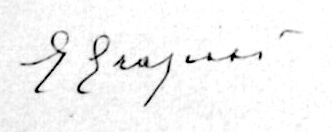
Giuseppe Graziosi's signature

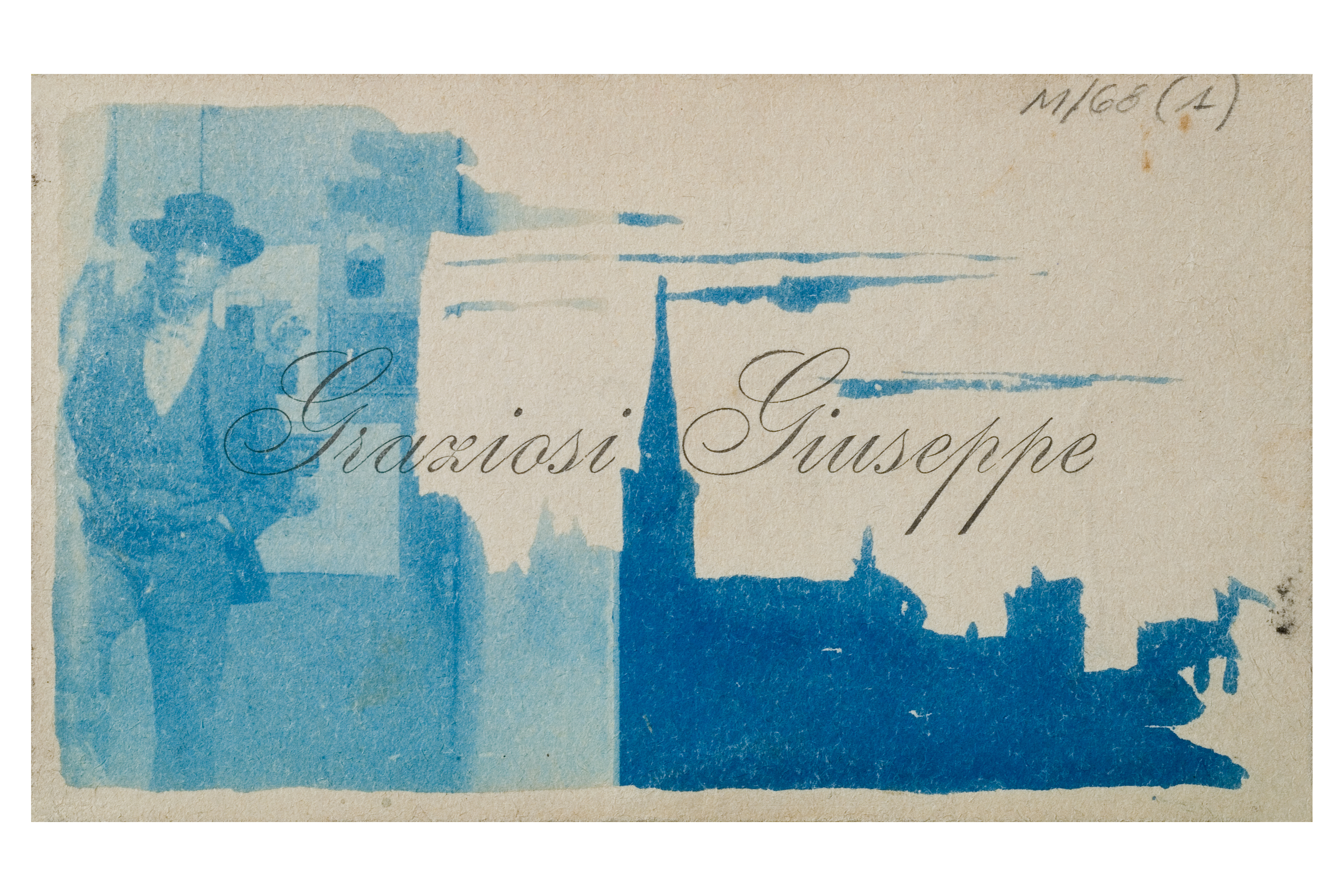
Business card of Giuseppe Graziosi, Modena, Civic Museum

His work was used as a reference by many Modenese artists working throughout the first half of the twentieth century. Despite his long stays in Florence and Milan, Graziosi continued to actively participate in cultural events through his participation in local exhibitions and in the main artistic circles such as the Accademia del Fiasco and the Associazione degli Artisti e della Stampa in Modena.

== Biography ==
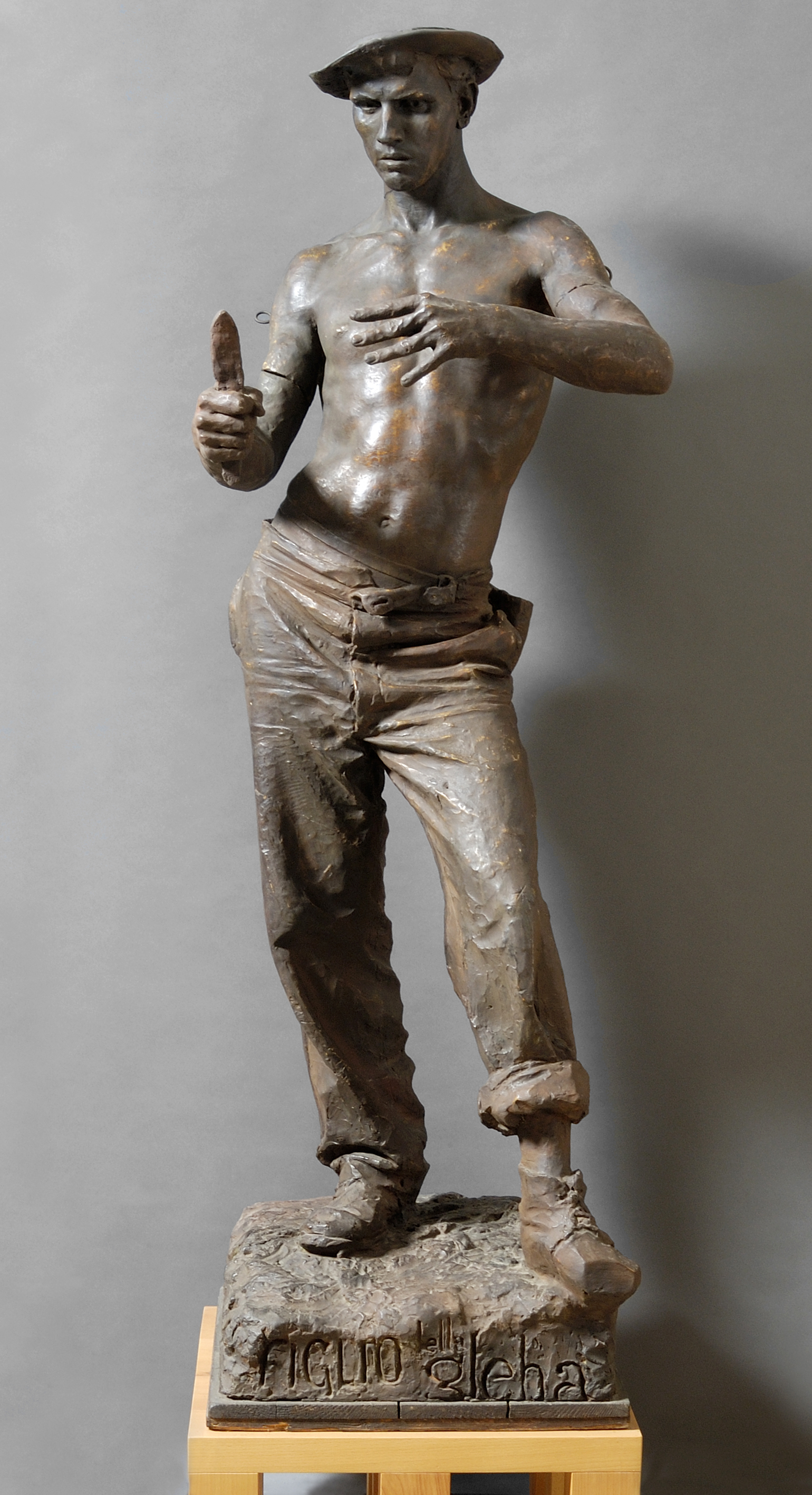
Giuseppe Graziosi, Il figlio della Gleba, 1898, Modena, Gipsoteca "Giuseppe Graziosi"

Giuseppe Graziosi was born on January 25, 1879, in Savignano sul Panaro (Modena) to Pietro Graziosi and Angela Marchi, sharecroppers of the Mombrina estate owned by Arsenio Crespellani, mayor of the small town and a well-known archaeologist. Having recognized the talents of the young man, Crespellani and his wife Emilia financed his training in Modena, Florence, Rome and Paris.

Graziosi died in Florence on July 2, 1942. On September 30 he was commemorated in Maranello (Modena) by friends, colleagues and authorities including Ardengo Soffici, Felice Carena, who pronounced the eulogy, Baccio Maria Bacci, Francesco Messina, Luciano Minguzzi and Italo Griselli.

=== Artistic education in Modena ===
From 1892 to 1898 he completed his first artistic apprenticeship at the Royal Institute of Fine Arts in Modena where he attended the special course of sculpture under the guidance of Giuseppe Gibellini, inspired by Neapolitan sculpture produced by Achille D'Orsi, Filippo Cifariello and Vincenzo Gemito. Examples are works such as La cicca (Modena, private collection), the portraits of Mr. and Mrs. Crespellani and The Saint John the Baptist, awarded a prize at the exhibition of the Society of Encouragement of Modena in 1897.

In 1898 he finished his last year of apprenticeship with the statue from life, Il figlio della gleba (The son of the serfs), which was presented and praised at the National Exhibition of Turin. Starting from this year Graziosi competes three times (1898, 1902-1903 and 1907) in the tests for the Competition of the National Artistic Pension in Rome, without any success.

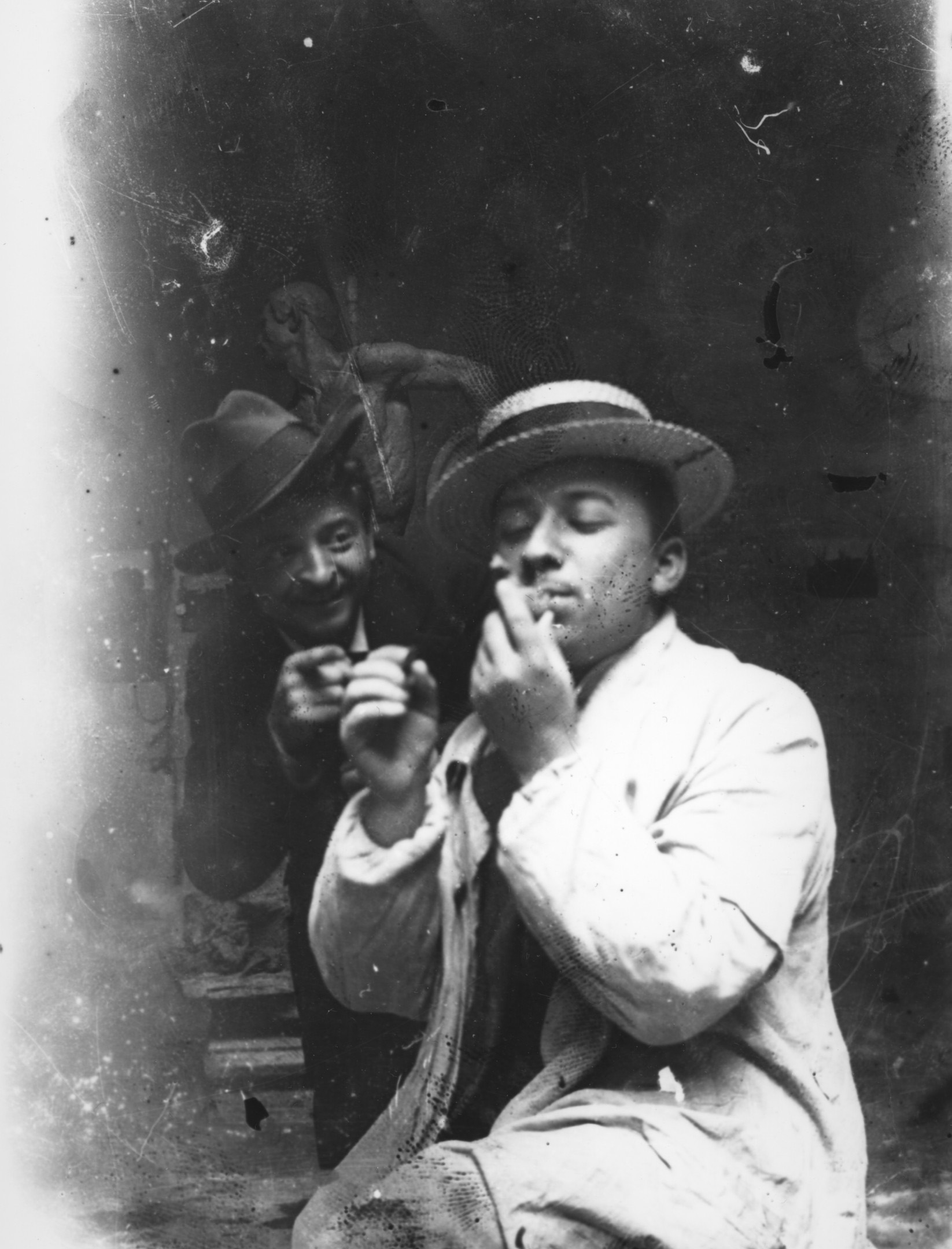
Graziosi and classmates at the Academy of Fine Arts in Florence

=== Florence ===
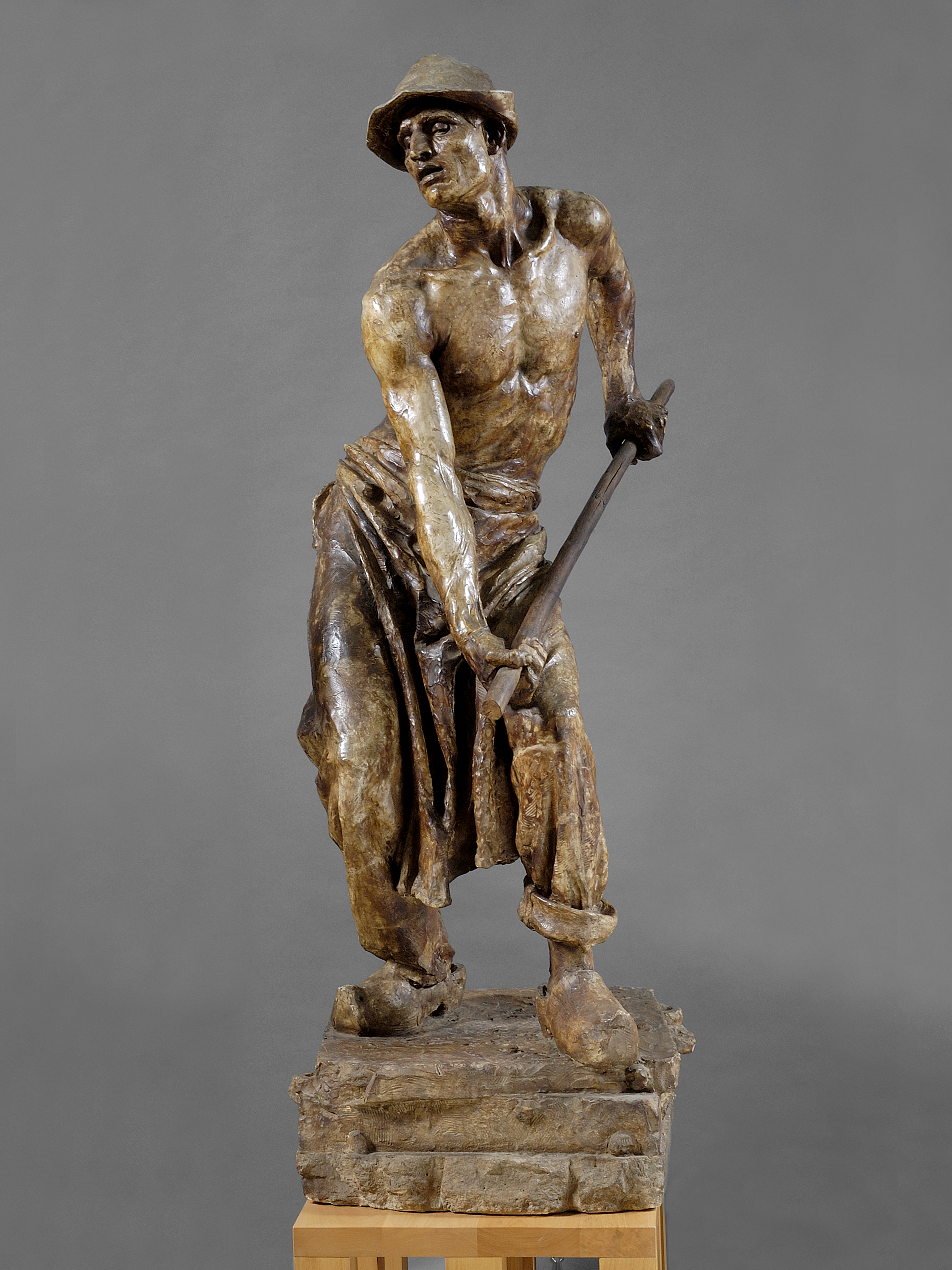
Giuseppe Graziosi, Il fonditore, 1899, Modena, Gipsoteca "Giuseppe Graziosi"

He attended the Free School of the Nude under the guidance of the sculptor Augusto Rivalta. At that time Giovanni Fattori taught painting in the women's section and his studio was likely a resort for Graziosi and his companions, among them the writer and painter Ardengo Soffici.

It was his frequenting of the Pignone Foundry in Florence that gave him the idea for the statue The Foundryman (Modena, Gipsoteca "Giuseppe Graziosi"), made in 1899 in Modena and presented at the Universal Exhibition in Paris in 1900 where Graziosi was awarded a bronze medal. Meanwhile, he obtained certification for the teaching of drawing in technical and normal schools.

=== Rome ===
From 1900 to 1901 he served in the military in the barracks of Traspontina in Rome, as an attache at first to the Photographic Section of Monte Mario, and then to the restoration of Castel Sant'Angelo. His friendship with the painter Ezio Castellucci. At the end of his military service in 1902, he attended the Free School of the Nude at the Academy of Fine Arts in Rome.

=== Paris ===
In 1903 Graziosi stays in Paris with his friend Ardengo Soffici. In the city he works for a German client and collaborates with the sculptor Salesio Lugli from Carpi, a fellow student at the Institute of Fine Arts in Modena.

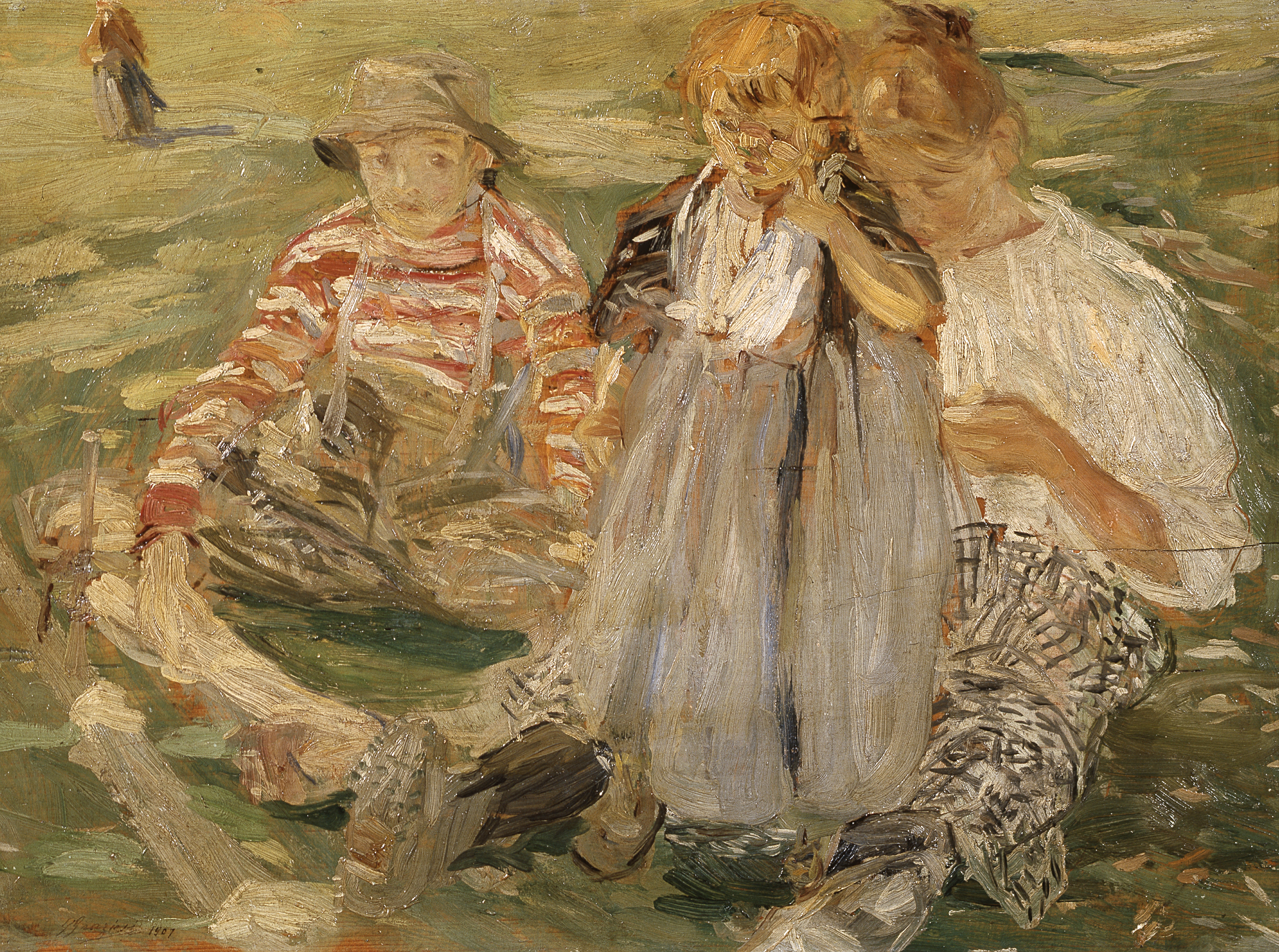
Giuseppe Graziosi, Children on the lawn, 1907, Modena, Gipsoteca "Giuseppe Graziosi".

=== Giovane Etruria ===
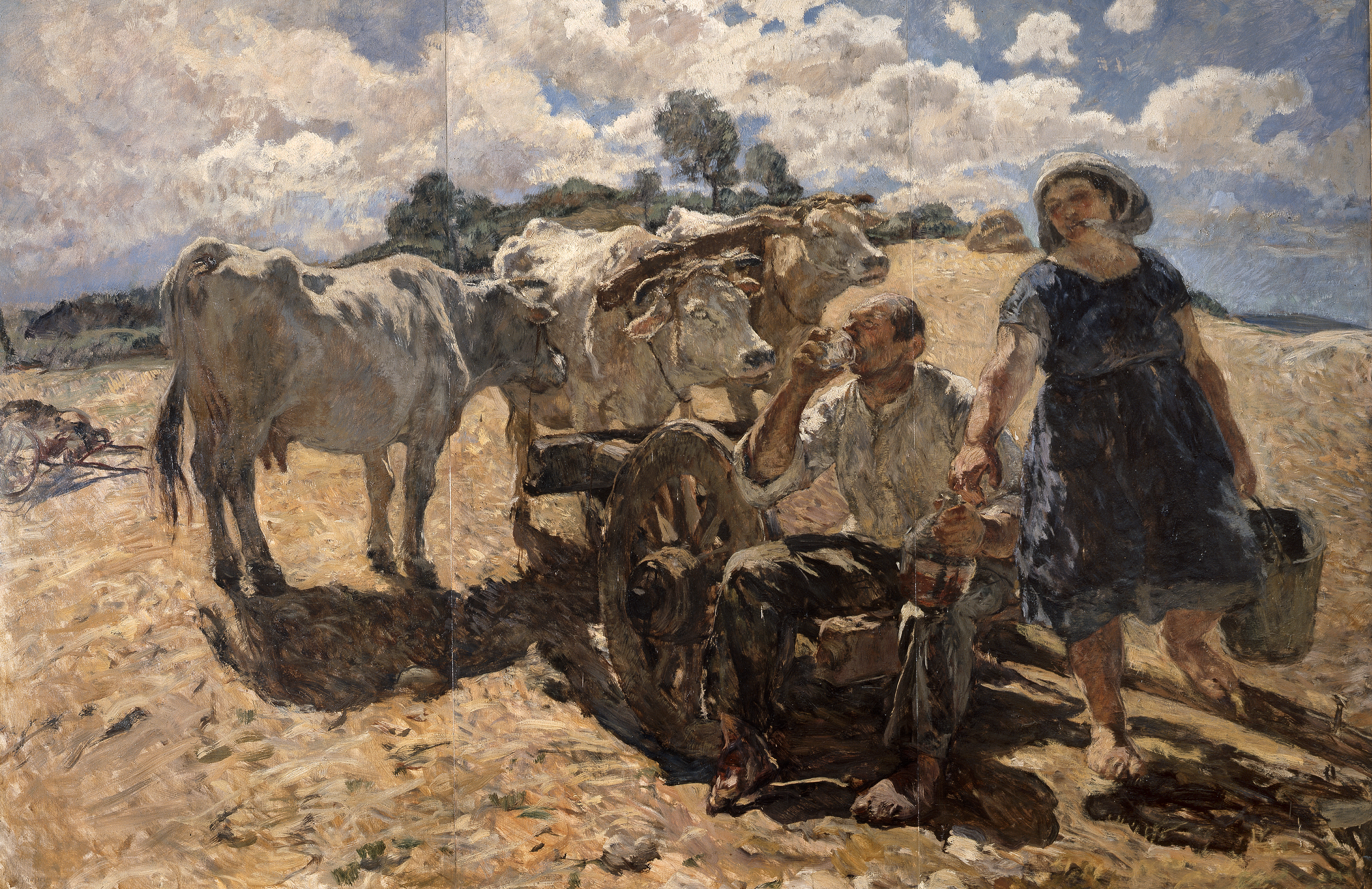
Giuseppe Graziosi, Rest in the fields, 1925 circa, Modena, Palazzo Comunale

Graziosi, who in 1904 had resumed lessons at the Free School of Nude, won the competition "Baruzzi" of Bologna for two editions: in 1904 with the sculpture All work and in 1908 with the painting Malocchio.

In 1906 he joined the group "Giovane Etruria" promoted by Plinio Nomellini and Galileo Chini. He married on February 5 Bianca Coduri, whom he had met at the Academy of Florence, and from which he will have two children, Paul and Rosetta. With the group he participates in major exhibitions: in 1906 at the National Exhibition in Milan and in 1914 at the Exhibition of the Roman Secession.

=== Classical art ===
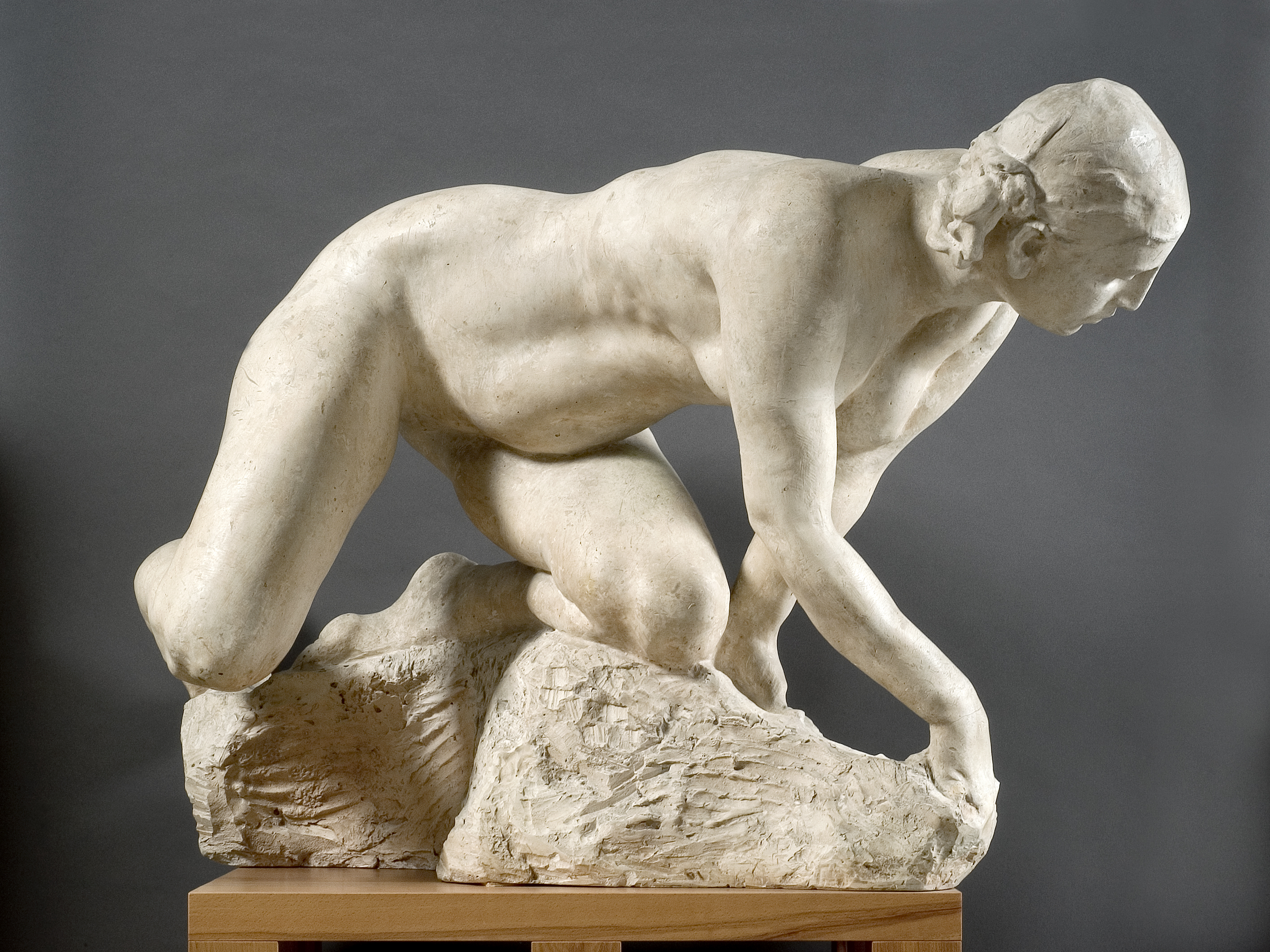
Giuseppe Graziosi, The She-wolf, 1912, Modena, Gipsoteca "Giuseppe Graziosi".

These were years of intense activity that saw him involved in the international competition for the sketches of the monument to Don Bosco to be erected in Turin (1913), in the creation of a funerary monument for the Monumental Cemetery of Rosario (Santa Fe), and in important exhibitions dedicated to graphics, among which is the exhibition of Italian etchers held in London in 1916.

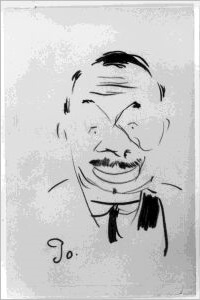
Giuseppe Graziosi, Self-portrait caricature, 1920–1930, Modena, Gipsoteca "Giuseppe Graziosi".

From May 24, 1915, to the end of 1918 Graziosi enlisted in the army during the First World War and served, as a draftsman, at the Directorate of the III Regiment Genio-Specialist Photographers.

=== 1920s ===
In 1924 he bought a house in Liguria, in Sanremo. The variety of the Ligurian landscape inspired the artist to draw several paintings and graphics. In 1929 at the Littoriale in Bologna he inaugurated the equestrian monument to Mussolini.

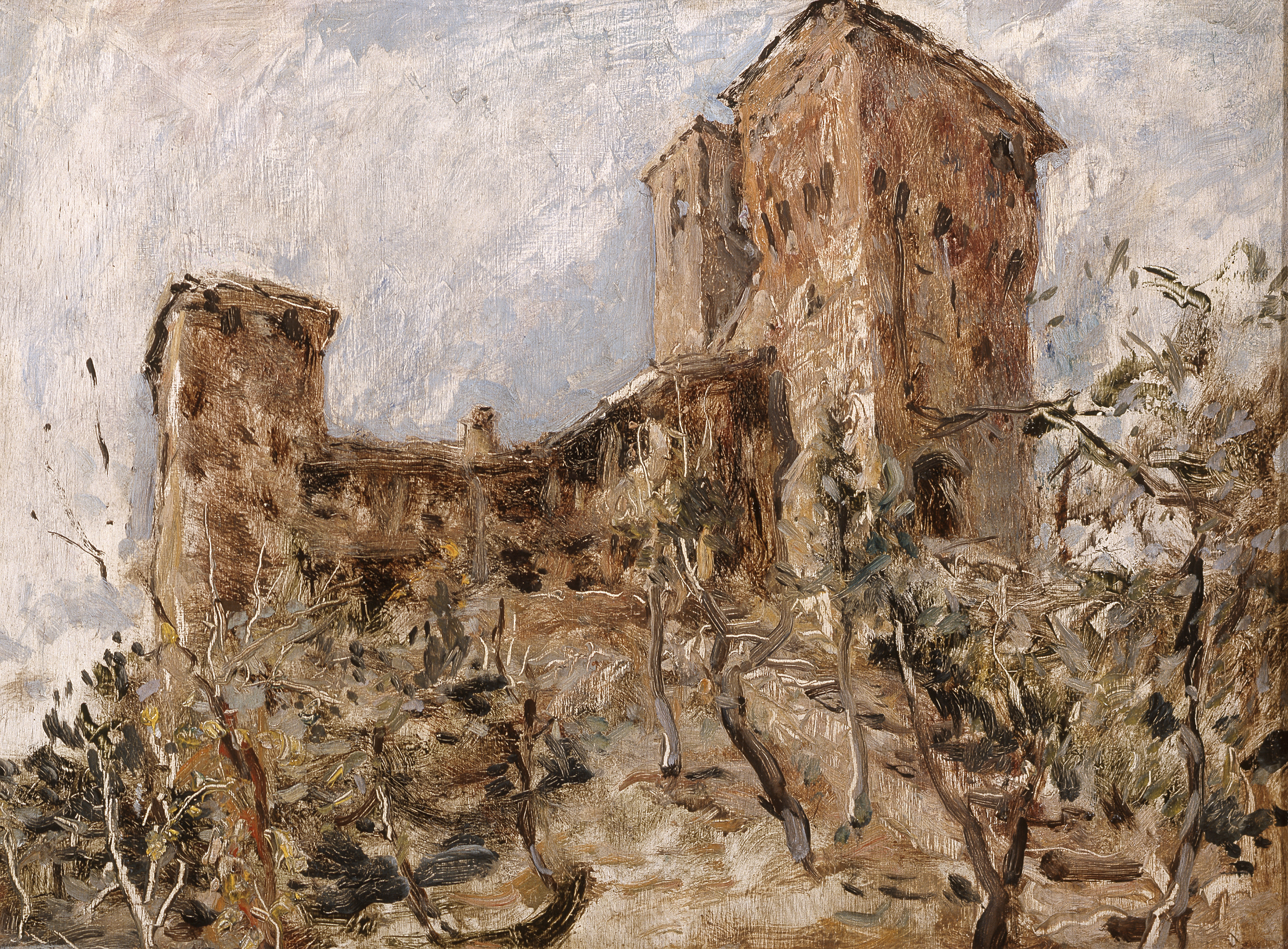
Giuseppe Graziosi, The castle of Maranello, 1936 - 1942, Modena, Gipsoteca "Giuseppe Graziosi".

=== 1930s & 1940s ===
The artist continued to take part in exhibitions such as the Quadrennial of Rome (1931, 1935 and 1939) and the first National Exhibition of Sports Art organized in 1936 by the Italian National Olympic Committee at the Palazzo delle Esposizioni in Rome. Between 1931 and 1938 he realizes the fountains of Modena among which we remember the Fountain of the two rivers and that of the covered market of via Albinelli.

In 1936 he was appointed Knight of the Order of the Crown of Italy and bought the Castle of Maranello where he set up his summer residence and set up the study in the church annex also moving the gallery of plaster casts.

== Expositions and Academics ==
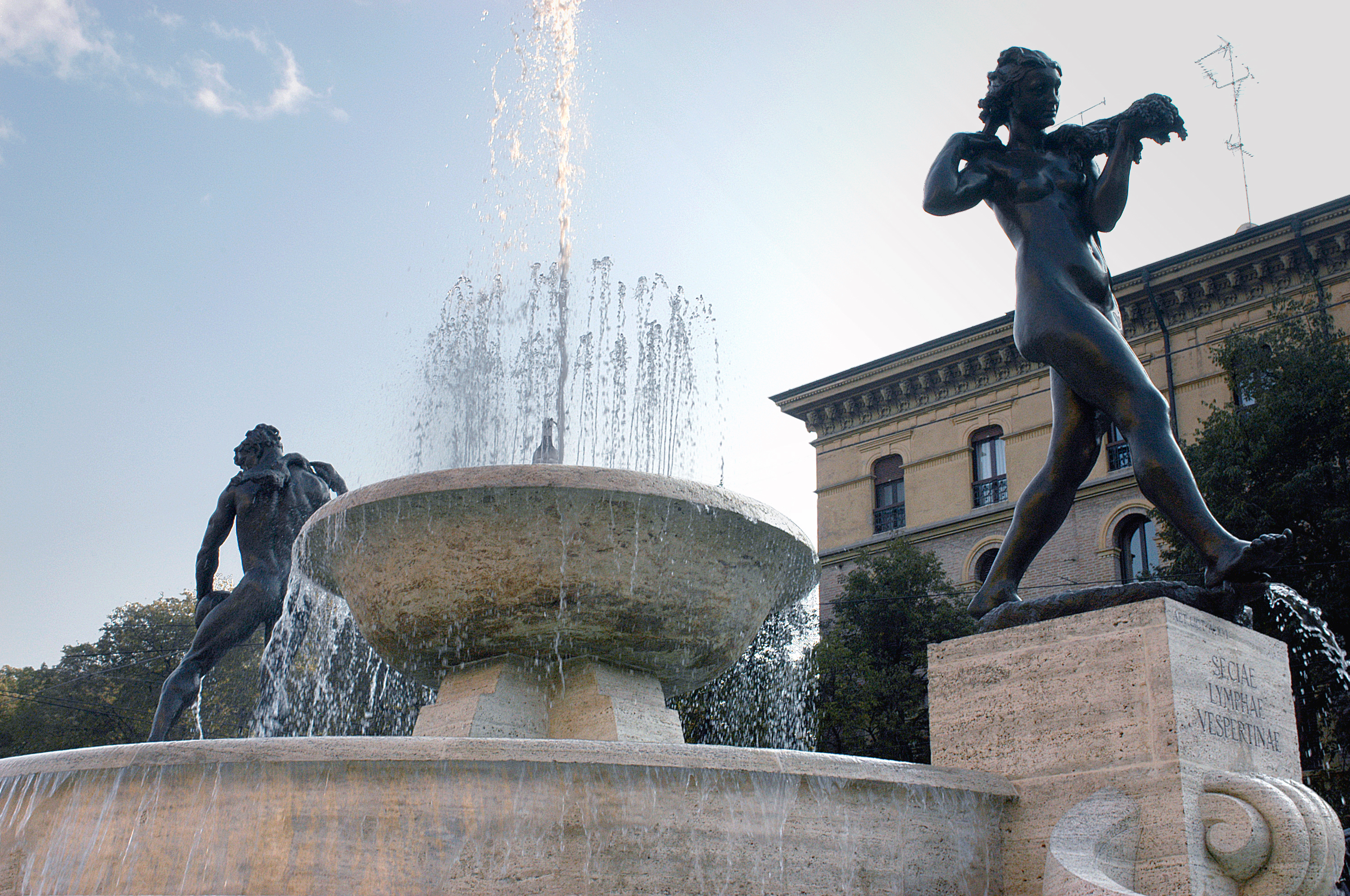
Giuseppe Graziosi, Fountain of the two rivers, 1939, Modena, Largo Garibaldi

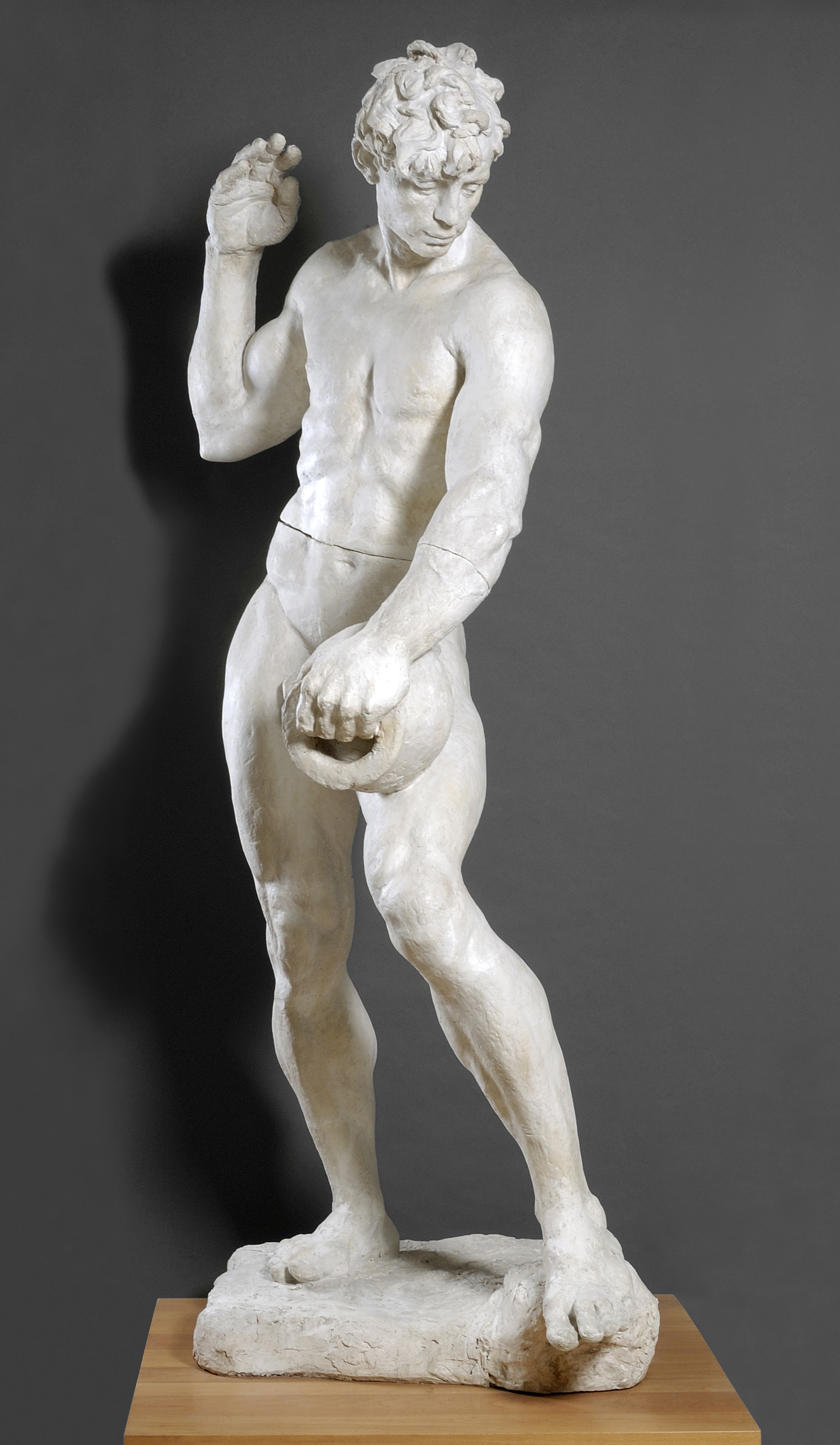
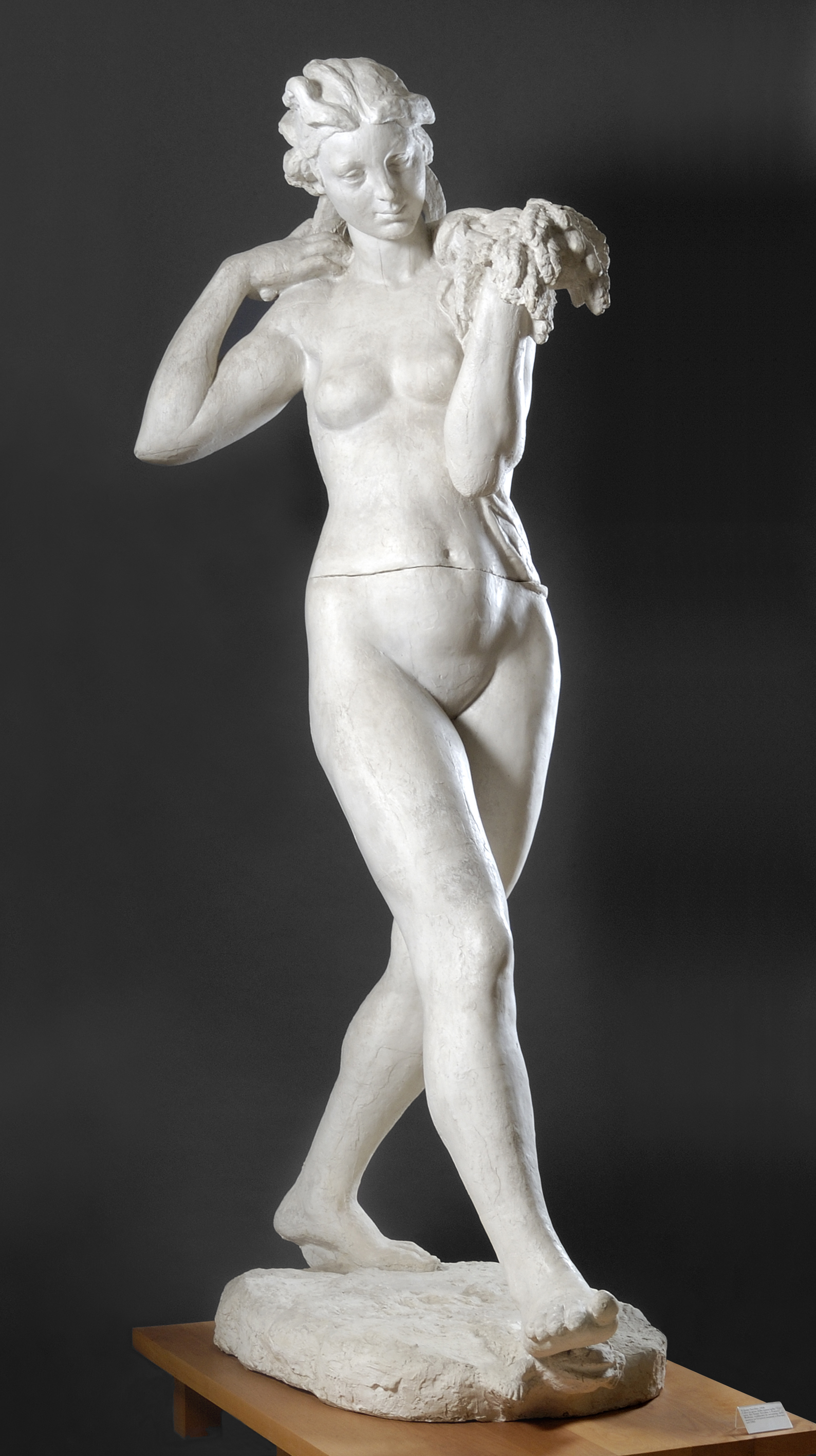
Giuseppe Graziosi, Il fiume Secchia (a destra), Il fiume Panaro (a sinistra), 1936, Modena, Gipsoteca "Giuseppe Graziosi"

To the artist are dedicated important personal exhibitions: in 1918 in Florence, in Palazzo Antinori; in 1919 to the Gallery Pesaro of Milan, in 1940 to the XXII International Exposition of Venice and in 1941 to the Gallery of the Million in Milan, the first one, this, of alone designs. As a professor of sculpture teaches at the Academies of Fine Arts in Milan, Naples and Florence.

== Critique ==
An exhibition of Graziosi's work was held in 1963 at Palazzo Strozzi in Florence and an in-depth study of his oeuvre by Gabriella Guandalini was published in the first catalog (1984, recently updated) dedicated to the Gipsoteca Graziosi of the Civic Museum of Modena. Later commentary by Francesca Petrucci has clarified his position in the broader context of national and international figurative art.

== Gipsoteca "Giuseppe Graziosi" ==
The gallery of plaster casts was founded in Modena in 1984 following the donation by the heirs of a large collection of plastic, pictorial and graphic works by the artist Giuseppe Graziosi. After an initial location at the Istituto San Paolo, in 1994 the Gipsoteca was set up on the ground floor of Palazzo dei Musei.

== Photographic archive ==
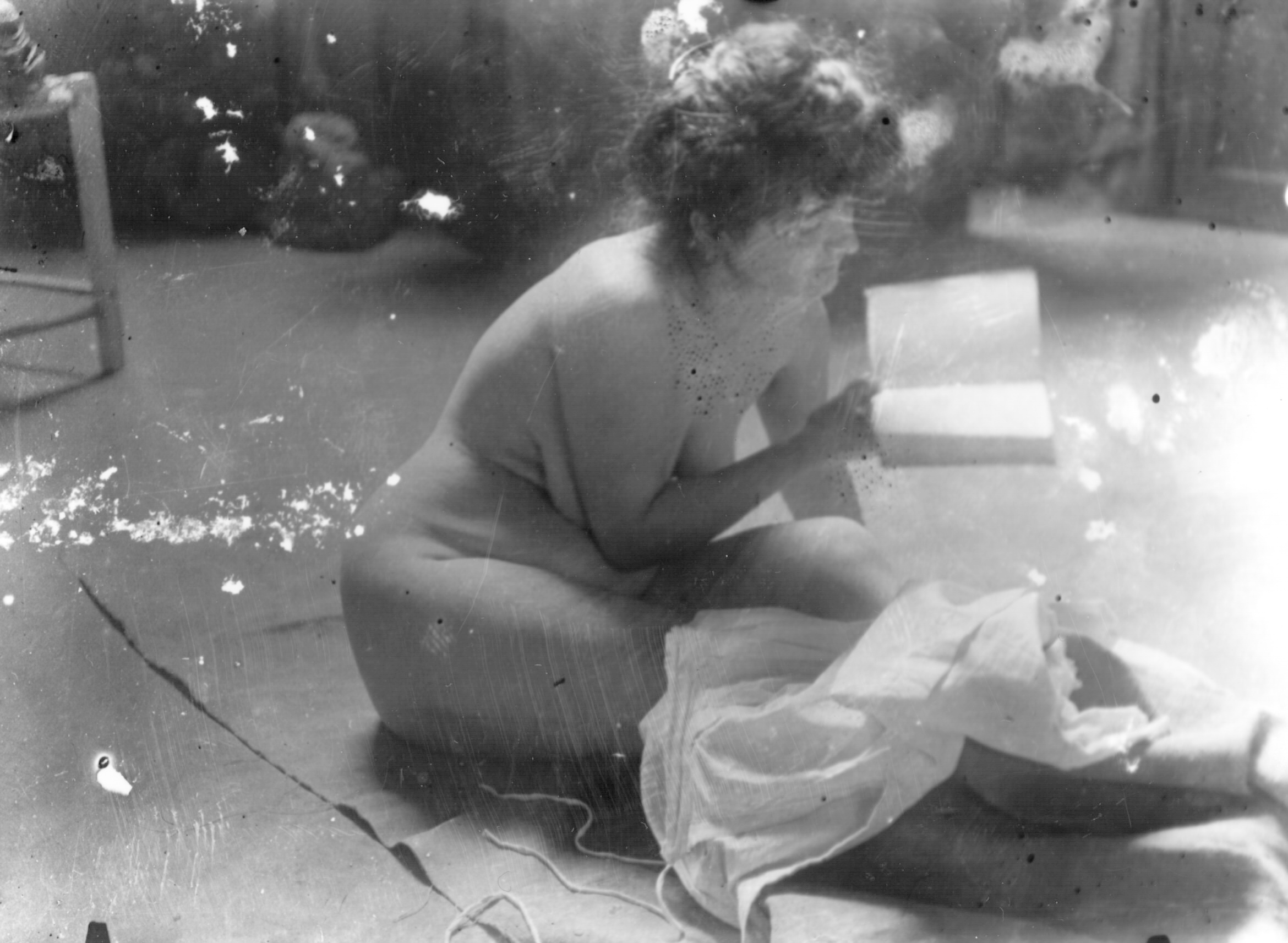
Giuseppe Graziosi, Model posing, 1900–1907, Modena, Civic Museum

The photographic archive donated by Graziosi's heirs in 1999 consists of 2144 images taken by the artist on different supports: negative and positive stereoscopic plates, negatives on glass plates and gelatin on nitrate film.

== Honors ==
Commendatore dell'Ordine della Corona d'Italia - ribbon for ordinary uniform

Commendatore dell'Ordine della Corona d'Italia
— 1920

Commendatore dell'Ordine della Corona d'Italia - ribbon for ordinary uniform

Commendatore dell'Ordine della Corona d'Italia
— 1920

Cavaliere dell'Ordine della Corona d'Italia - ribbon for ordinary uniform

Cavaliere dell'Ordine della Corona d'Italia
— 1936

Cavaliere dell'Ordine della Corona d'Italia - ribbon for ordinary uniform

Cavaliere dell'Ordine della Corona d'Italia
— 1936

== See also ==
- Paolo Graziosi (archeologist)
- Giuseppe Mozzanica
- Ardengo Soffici
- Augusto Rivalta
- Museo Civico di Modena

== Bibliography ==
- Emanuela Andreoli, GRAZIOSI, Giuseppe, in Dizionario biografico degli italiani, vol. 59, Roma, Istituto dell'Enciclopedia Italiana, 2002. URL consultato il 16 dicembre 2015.
- Maria Canova e Francesca Piccinini, ed. (2007). Il fondo Giuseppe Graziosi del Museo Civico d'Arte. Modena.
- "Artisti modenesi ammessi all'Esposizione nazionale d'Arte sportiva". Gazzetta dell'Emilia. No. 26 (30-31 gennaio 1936).
- "Attività degli Artisti Modenesi". Gazzetta dell'Emilia. No. 30 (14- 15 febbraio 1936).
- M. Canova; et al. (2003). Giuseppe Graziosi dalla fotografia al quadro. Opere 1900-1942. Vol. catalogo della mostra. Modena.
- G. Guandalini con la collaborazione di G. Martinelli Braglia, ed. (1984). La Gipsoteca Giuseppe Graziosi. Modena.
- F. Morandi (2006). Il fondo Graziosi nell'Istituto d'Arte Venturi di Modena. Vol. I, 1. Reggio Emilia. pp. 87–95.
- Cristina Stefani (2008). Francesca Piccinini e Luciano Rivi (ed.). Giuseppe Graziosi. Modena. pp. 97–121.
- Giuseppe Graziosi 1879-1942. Vol. catalogo della mostra (Firenze-Milano). Firenze. 1994.
- F. Petrucci, ed. (1995). I luoghi di Giuseppe Graziosi. Dipinti e disegni. Vol. catalogo della mostra (Vignola). Milano.
- F. Petrucci, ed. (1996). Giuseppe Graziosi. La stagione dei campi, opere dal 1903 al 1913. Vol. catalogo della mostra (Modigliana-Tredozio). Firenze.
- Graziosi a Maranello: il ritorno di un grande artista. Vol. catalogo della mostra (Maranello). Fiorano. 1997.
- F. Petrucci, E. Vespignani, ed. (1998). Giuseppe Graziosi. Incisioni e disegni. Vol. catalogo della mostra. Firenze.
- F. Petrucci, ed. (1998). I maestri del naturalismo europeo. Opere di Giuseppe Graziosi, Constantin Meunier, Jean Franςois Millet. Vol. catalogo della mostra (Savignano sul Panaro). Firenze.
- F. Piccinini e L. Rivi, ed. (2001). I colori del segno. Il Disegno e le Arti a Modena tra Ottocento e Novecento. Aspetti e situazioni. Vol. catalogo della mostra. Modena.
- G. Corrado, ed. (2002). Giuseppe Graziosi 1879-1942 nelle collezioni modenesi. Vol. catalogo della mostra. Modena.
- F. Piccinini e C. Stefani, ed. (2007). Ghigno e sorriso. Caricature del Novecento a Modena. Vol. catalogo della mostra. Modena.
- Luciano Rivi (2008). Francesca Piccinini e Luciano Rivi (ed.). Giuseppe Graziosi. Tra Firenze e Parigi, il "salto vitale" nei ricordi di Ardengo Soffici. Modena. pp. 102–109.
