= Nero's Mistress =

- Directed by: Steno
- Written by: Stefano Vanzina, Alberto Sordi, Rodolfo Sonego, Sandro Continenza
- Produced by: Franco Cristaldi
- Starring: Alberto Sordi; Vittorio De Sica; Gloria Swanson; Brigitte Bardot
- Cinematography: Mario Bava
- Edited by: Mario Serandrei, Giuliana Attenni
- Music by: Angelo Francesco Lavagnino
- Production company: Cinecittà
- Distributed by: Titanus
- Release date: 1956
- Running time: 95 min
- Country: Italy
- Language: Italian
- Box office: 571,983 admissions (France)

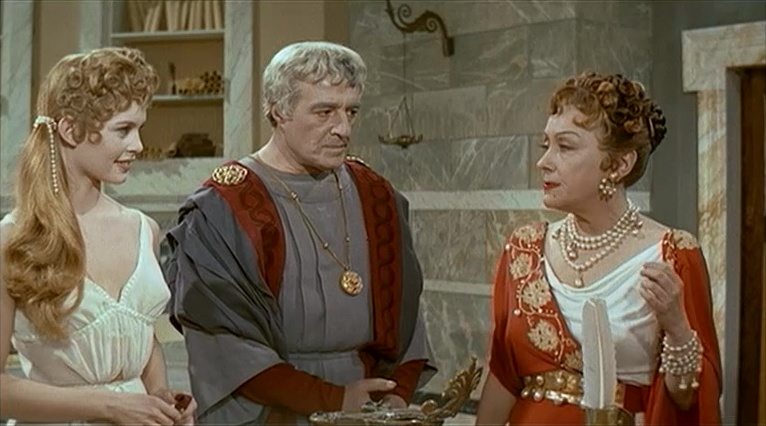
Brigitte Bardot, Vittorio De Sica, and Gloria Swanson

Mio figlio Nerone (literally: My Son Nero), released in the U.S. as Nero's Mistress is a 1956 Italian historical comedy film directed by Steno and starring Alberto Sordi, Vittorio De Sica, Gloria Swanson, and Brigitte Bardot, with cinematography by Mario Bava. It depicts a visit by the Roman Emperor Nero and his entourage to a coastal villa.

The movie was released in Italy in September 1956 and in France in October 1957. The U.S. dub, released in 1962, was recut to a substantially different film, shifting the emphasis from Agrippina to Poppaea, as the title reflects.

== Plot ==
The young emperor Nero proves himself spoiled, childish, and unable to cope with the governing of Rome. His domineering mother Agrippina and the wise philosopher Seneca try to change the personality of the emperor, but nothing can make Nero into a wise and honorable ruler. Agrippina then takes advantage of a poetic and theatrical failure of Nero to kill him and take over the government of Rome.

Seneca initially supports the woman, but then plays a double game and warns Nero about the conspiracy. Agrippina smartly lays the blame on the Christians and on Seneca, who could be sentenced to death. However Nero is easily deceived again and proved magnanimous, forgiving all.
The trouble starts at court for the umpteenth time when Nero finds out that Seneca had lied about the "poetic art" of the emperor, saying to the people that Nero sings and performs worse than a stupid monkey ...

== Cast ==
- Alberto Sordi - Nero
- Vittorio De Sica - Seneca the Younger
- Gloria Swanson - Agrippina the Younger
- Brigitte Bardot - Poppaea
- Ciccio Barbi - Anicetus
- Memmo Carotenuto - Crepereius
- Mino Doro - Corbulo
- Enzo Furlai - Segimerus
- Agnese Dubbini - Ugolilla
- Georgia Moll - Lydia

== Production ==
The movie was filmed in 1955, with interior scenes filmed at Rome's Cinecitta studio.

The movie is notable for the first appearance of Brigitte Bardot as a blonde. A natural brunette, she was asked by the director to appear as a blonde as he felt that it was appropriate to her character of an intriguing and alluring treacherous woman. Rather than wear a wig Bardot decided to dye her hair. She was so pleased with the results that she decided to retain the hair colour.

== Reception ==
Variety felt that "it does not quite come off as consistently amusing."
