= Lea Padovani =

Italian actress (1923–1991)

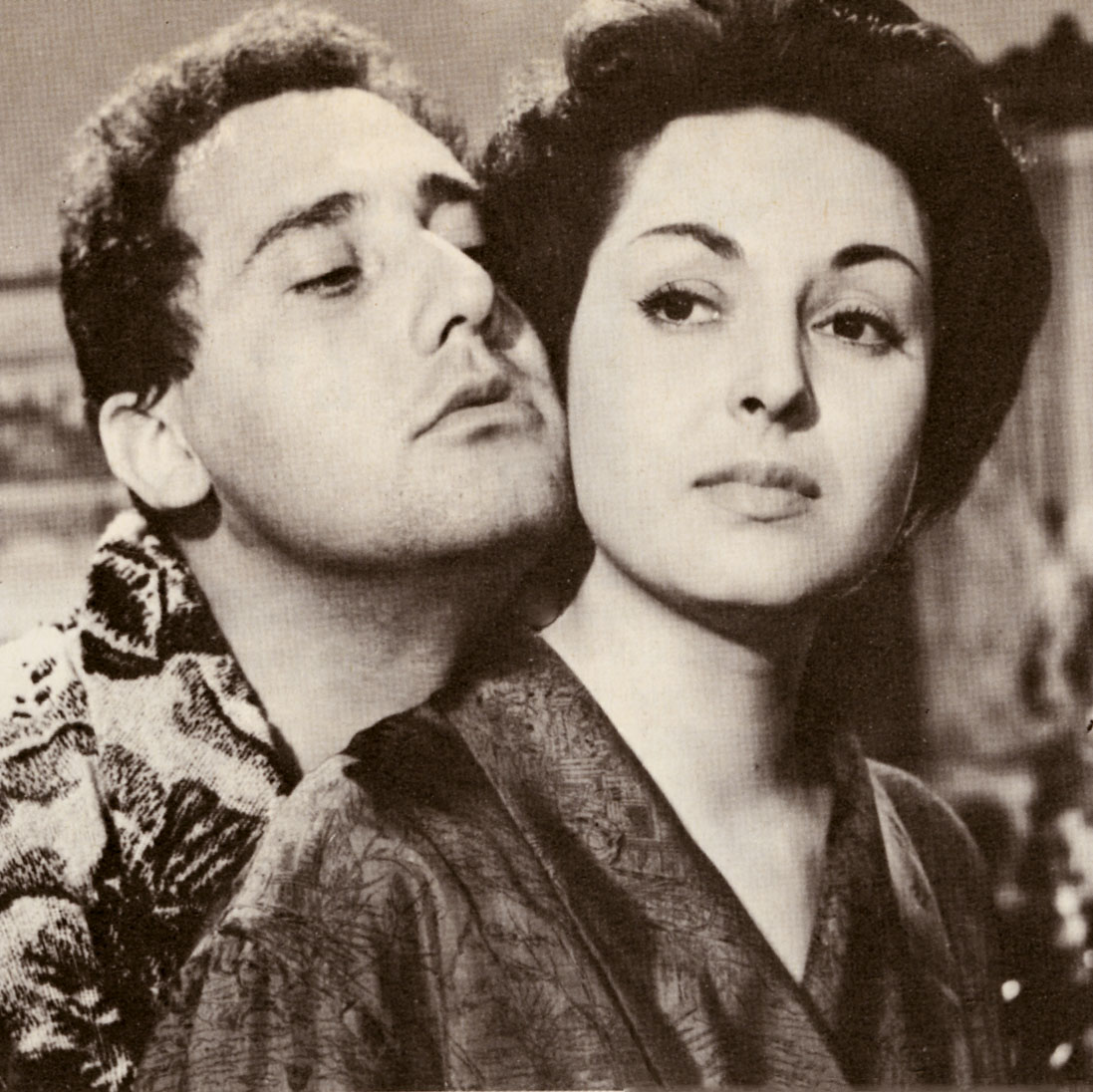
- Padovani with Alberto Sordi in Il seduttore (1954)
- Born: 28 July 1923; Montalto di Castro, Viterbo, Kingdom of Italy
- Died: 23 June 1991 (aged 70); Rome, Italy
- Occupation: Actress
- Years active: 1945–1990

Lea Padovani (28 July 1923 – 23 June 1991) was an Italian film actress. She appeared in 60 films between 1945 and 1990. She starred in the film Black Dossier which was entered into the 1955 Cannes Film Festival.

== Partial filmography ==
- The Innocent Casimiro (1945) – Marcella
- The Sun Still Rises (1946) – Laura
- The White Devil (1947) – Katiousha
- Call of the Blood (1948) – Maddelena
- Letter at Dawn (1948) – Anna
- I cavalieri dalle maschere nere (1948) – Violante
- Che tempi! (1948) – Anna Pastorino
- Give Us This Day (also known as Christ in Concrete) (1949) – Annuziata
- Night Taxi (1950) – (scenes deleted)
- The Accusation (1950) – Irene
- Three Steps North (1951) – Elena Ravezza
- La grande rinuncia (1951) – Elisabetta / Suor Teresa
- Honeymoon Deferred (1951) – Rosina Maggini
- I due derelitti (1951) – Elena
- Fiamme sulla laguna (1951) – Anna
- Rome 11:00 (1952) – Caterina
- I figli non si vendono (1952) – Anna
- Don Lorenzo (1952) – Mara
- Toto and the Women (1952) – Ginetta
- Papà ti ricordo (1952) – Maria
- One of Those (1953) – Maria
- Cinema d'altri tempi (1953) – Caterina
- Donne Proibite (1954) – Franca
- Mid-Century Loves (1954) – Isabella (segment "Girandola 1910")
- Gran varietà (1954) – Anna la soubrette (episodio 'Il fine dicitore')
- A Slice of Life (1954) – Maria (segment "Pupo, Il")
- The Contessa's Secret (1954) – La princesse Mathilde Bonaparte
- Il seduttore (1954) – Norma
- Guai ai vinti (1954) – Luisa
- Naples Is Always Naples (1954) – Carmela Gargiulo
- La tua donna (1954) – Luisa, sua moglie
- Barrier of the Law (1954) – Anna
- Black Dossier (1955) – Françoise Le Guen
- Chéri-Bibi (1955) – La Comtesse
- La moglie è uguale per tutti (1955) – Cristina Ferretti
- Folgore Division (1955) – Salvi's Girlfriend
- Scandal in Sorrento (1955) – Violante Ruotolo
- The Intruder (1956) – Luisa Marcelli
- Solo Dio mi fermerà (1957) – Gloria
- An Eye for an Eye (1957) – Lola Zardi
- The Lovers of Montparnasse (1958) – Rosalie
- Bread, Love and Andalusia (1958) – Donna Violante Ruotolo
- The Naked Maja (1958) – Queen Maria Luisa
- La Princesse de Clèves (1961) – La Reine Catherine de Médicis
- The Reluctant Saint (1962) – Giuseppe's Mother
- Germinal (1963) – La Maheude
- The Empty Canvas (1963) – Balestrieri's Widow
- Shivers in Summer (1964) – Alba Mannelli
- Our Men in Bagdad (1966) – Fiodorenko's partner
- Almost a Man (1966) – Michele's mother
- Gli altri, gli altri... e noi (1967)
- Candy (1968) – Silvia Fontegliulo
- So Long Gulliver (1970) – Woman
- Equinozio (1971) – Margherita
- Ehrengard (1982) – The Grand Duchess
- The King's Whore (1990) – Countess Cumiana
