= Pina Bottin =

Italian actress (1933–2024)

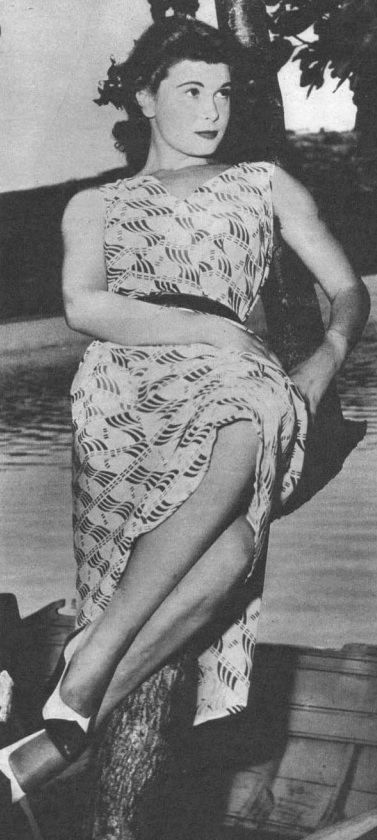
- Bottin in 1953
- Born: Giuseppina Bottin; 17 March 1933; Padua, Italy
- Died: 1 August 2024 (aged 91); Padua, Italy
- Years active: 1953–1964
- Era: Classic Era
- Notable work: Hannibal (1959), Empty Eyes (1953)

Giuseppina "Pina" Bottin (17 March 1933 – 1 August 2024) was an Italian actress. She worked in various Italian films and television programs from 1953 to 1970.

== Biography ==
After having been noticed in a beauty contest, in 1953 Bottin made her acting debut in Empty Eyes. Bottin often played the role of a ingénue (an endearingly innocent young woman), either from Rome as in A Hero of Our Times, or from Venice as in The Seducer. During her career, she alternated main roles in B-movies and supporting roles in major productions. On 1 August 2024, it was announced that she died at her home in the Sacra Famiglia neighborhood of Padua at the age of 91.

== Partial filmography ==
=== Films ===
- Empty Eyes (Il sole negli occhi), directed by Antonio Pietrangeli (1953)
- The Walk (La passeggiata), directed by Renato Rascel (1953)
- Mizar (Sabotaggio in mare), directed by Francesco De Robertis (1954)
- Marriage (Il matrimonio), directed by Antonio Petrucci (1954)
- The Seducer (Il seduttore), directed by Franco Rossi (1954)
- The Bachelor (Lo scapolo), directed by Antonio Pietrangeli (1955)
- Tua per la vita, directed by Sergio Grieco (1955)
- A Hero of our Times (Un eroe dei nostri tempi), directed by Mario Monicelli (1955)
- Buonanotte... avvocato!, directed by Giorgio Bianchi (1955)
- Da qui all'eredità, directed by Riccardo Freda (1955)
- Allow Me, Daddy! (Mi permette, babbo!), directed by Mario Bonnard (1956)
- Cantando sotto le stelle, directed by Marino Girolami (1956)
- The Intruder (L'intrusa), directed by Raffaello Matarazzo (1956)
- La ragazza di piazza San Pietro, directed by Piero Costa (1958)
- The Naked Maja, directed by Henry Koster and Mario Russo (1958)
- Gagliardi e pupe, directed by Roberto Bianchi Montero (1958)
- The Pirate of the Black Hawk (Il pirata dello sparviero nero), directed by Sergio Grieco (1958)
- Hannibal (Annibale), directed by Carlo Ludovico Bragaglia and Edgar G. Ulmer (1959)

=== Voice acting ===
- Fiorella Betti in Tua per la vita, Annibale
- Franca Dominici in Il sole negli occhi
- Adriana Parrella in Lo scapolo
- Dhia Cristiani in La ragazza di San Pietro

=== Television ===
Bottin took part in a number of editions of Carosello: In 1957 with Nino Besozzi, Fanny Marchiò, Ferruccio Amendola and Munaretto; In 1959 with Gianni Caiafa and Fausto Tommei; in 1961 and 1964 with Serena Cantalupi and James Turnbull.
