= The Hours of Love =

1963 film

- Directed by: Luciano Salce
- Screenplay by: Luciano Salce; Franco Castellano; Pipolo
- Story by: Franco Castellano; Pipolo
- Produced by: Isidoro Broggi; Renato Libassi
- Starring: Ugo Tognazzi; Emmanuelle Riva; Barbara Steele; Mara Berni; Diletta D'Andrea
- Cinematography: Erico Menczer
- Edited by: Roberto Cinquini
- Music by: Luiz Bonfá
- Production company: Dino De Laurentiis Cinematografica S.p.A.
- Distributed by: Cinema V Distributing, Inc.
- Release date: March 1963 (Rome)
- Country: Italy

The Hours of Love (Italian: Le ore dell'amore) is a 1963 Italian comedy drama film directed by Luciano Salce.

== Cast ==
- Ugo Tognazzi as Gianni
- Emmanuelle Riva as Maretta
- Barbara Steele as Leila
- Umberto D'Orsi as Ottavio
- Mara Berni as Mrs. Cipriani
- Brunello Rondi as Cipriani
- Diletta D'Andrea as Mimma
- Mario Brega

== Release ==
The Hours of Love opened in Rome in March 1963 as Le ore dell'amore. It opened in New York on 2 September 1965.
