= L'amore nasce a Roma =

1958 film

- Directed by: Mario Amendola
- Written by: Mario Amendola; Ruggero Maccari
- Produced by: Enzo Merolle
- Starring: Claudio Villa; Antonio Cifariello; Valeria Moriconi
- Cinematography: Bitto Albertini
- Music by: Ovidio Sarra
- Release date: 1958
- Language: Italian

L'amore nasce a Roma (i.e. "Love was born in Rome") is a 1958 Italian comedy film written and directed by Mario Amendola and starring Claudio Villa, Antonio Cifariello, Rossella Como and Valeria Moriconi.

== Plot ==
Lello, a painter, and Mario, a singer, move to Rome looking for fortune and success, their native country village far behind them. Expressing little in the way of artistic sophistication, their initial experiences are discouraging. They end up meeting Doretta and Silvia, two gracious flower stand sellers in Piazza di Spagna, and they immediately hit it off romantically. Doretta falls for Lello, and Silvia for Mario, and together they do what they can to help out their new love interests navigate the city's many challenges. One day it is revealed that Lello actually is a talented singer, so that the painter transforms into "the singer". Feeling slighted, Mario, out of sheer spite, takes Lello's brushes and proceeds to make his paintings, which immediately attract interested buyers. With this apparent role reversal, the two women come to realize that their interests have switched accordingly, with Doretta falling for Mario and Silvia realizing that Lello is the man of her dreams. Just like a fairy tale, everyone lives happily ever....

== Cast ==
- Antonio Cifariello as Mario
- Claudio Villa as Lello
- Valeria Moriconi as Silvia
- Rossella Como as Doretta
- Nadia Marlowa as Mariella
- Carlo Campanini as Sor Cesare
- Alberto Sorrentino as Rubino
- Mario Carotenuto as The Pool Player
- Ivy Holzer as Doorkeeper's daughter
- Gino Buzzanca as Mario's father
- Ciccio Barbi as Lello's father
- Loris Gizzi as Mr. Connolly
- Nino Milano as Mr. Leoni
- Ignazio Leone as Mr. Carli
