= Antonio Cifariello =

Italian actor (1930–1968)

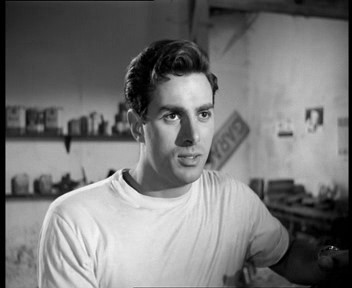
- Born: 19 May 1930; Naples, Italy
- Died: 12 December 1968 (aged 38); Lusaka, Zambia
- Occupation: Actor
- Years active: 1950-1968

Antonio Cifariello (19 May 1930 – 12 December 1968) was an Italian actor.

== Life and career ==
Born in Naples, son of the sculptor Filippo Cifariello, Antonio started his career in 1950 as the main actor, credited as Fabio Montale, in La sposa che vestiva di bianco, a film which had several production issues and that was released only in 1953.

In the meanwhile Cifariello appeared in several fotoromanzi using the stage name Mauro Vellani, and enrolled at the Centro Sperimentale di Cinematografia in Rome, graduating in 1953. The same year, he was chosen by Federico Fellini to star in Marriage Agency, a segment of the anthology film Love in the City. Following the release of the film, in a short time Cifariello established himself as one of the most requested young actors in Italian cinema, mainly active in romantic comedies and adventure films.

Tired of playing stereotypal characters of seducers or boyfriends, in the 1960s Cifariello gradually moved his career towards journalism and television documentaries.

On 12 December 1968, during a trip to Zambia for a RAI documentary, Cifariello died in a plane crash. He was 38.

== Partial filmography ==
- They Were Three Hundred (1952) - Sergente Cafiero
- Woman of the Red Sea (1953) - Pierluigi
- Amanti senza peccato (1953) - Righetto
- Love in the City (1953) - Giornalista (segment "Agenzia matrimoniale, Un'")
- It Happened in the Park (1953) - The Sailor
- Angels of Darkness (1954)
- Neapolitan Carousel (1954) - Don Armando
- Le signorine dello 04 (1955) - Amleto
- Le ragazze di San Frediano (1955) - Andrea Sernesi a.k.a. Bob
- The Belle of Rome (1955) - Otello
- Scandal in Sorrento (1955) - Nicola Pascazio 'Nicolino'
- I quattro del getto tonante (1955) - Tenente Luciano Zanchi
- The Awakening (1956) - Peppino
- Peccato di castità (1956)
- Noi siamo le colonne (1956) - Ugo Stefani
- Operazione notte (1957)
- The Doll That Took the Town (1957) - Giorgio Salustri
- Souvenir d'Italie (1957) - Gino
- Vacanze a Ischia (1957) - Antonio
- La mina (1958) - Stefano
- Young Husbands (1958) - Ettore Graziani
- The Adventures of Nicholas Nickleby (1958, TV Series) - Nicola Nickleby
- Resurrection (1958) - Chenbeck
- The Beautiful Legs of Sabrina (1958) - Teo
- L'amore nasce a Roma (1958) - Mario
- Promesse di marinaio (1958) - Mario
- Men and Noblemen (1959) - Mario Ludovici
- Ciao, ciao bambina! (1959) - Riccardo Branca
- Wild Cats on the Beach (1959) - Gino Santoni
- Vacations in Majorca (1959) - Ernesto
- Roulotte e roulette (1959) - Antonio Aiello
- Questo amore ai confini del mondo (1960) - Walter
- A Qualcuna Piace Calvo (1960) - Alberto Rossi
- Rome 1585 (1961) - Leonetto Ardenghi
- My Love Is Called Margarita (1961) - Eduardo Heredia, profesor de literatura
- Jessica (1962) - Gianni Crupi
- The Lovely Lola (1962) - Javier
- In Search of the Castaways (1962) - Chief Thalcave
- Giuseppe w Warszawie (1964) - Giuseppe Santucci (final film role)
