= A Hero of Our Times =

1955 film directed by Mario Monicelli

- Italian poster
- Directed by: Mario Monicelli
- Written by: Rodolfo Sonego; Mario Monicelli
- Story by: Rodolfo Sonego
- Produced by: Franco Cristaldi
- Starring: Alberto Sordi; Franca Valeri; Giovanna Ralli; Tina Pica
- Cinematography: Tino Santoni
- Edited by: Adriana Novelli
- Music by: Nino Rota
- Production company: Cinecittà
- Distributed by: Titanus
- Release date: 1955
- Running time: 85 minutes
- Country: Italy
- Language: Italian

A Hero of Our Times (Italian: Un eroe dei nostri tempi) is a 1955 Italian comedy film directed by Mario Monicelli and starring Alberto Sordi. In 2008, the film was included on the Italian Ministry of Cultural Heritage’s 100 Italian films to be saved, a list of 100 films that "have changed the collective memory of the country between 1942 and 1978."

== Plot ==
Alberto is an employee who is the Italian average of society of the Fifties. Alberto is a go-getter, attached only to his work, and believes that everyone meets him wants to bring Alberto bad luck. Alberto refuses every contact with other people, but soon finds himself caught in misunderstandings and so the people, to take revenge on him and his meanness, force him to change his identity.

== Cast ==
- Alberto Sordi as Alberto Menichetti
- Franca Valeri as Vedova De Ritis
- Giovanna Ralli as Marcella
- Tina Pica as Clotilde
- Mario Carotenuto as Gustavo
- Leopoldo Trieste as Aurelio
- Alberto Lattuada as Il direttore
- Bud Spencer as Fernando (as Carlo Pedersoli)
- Pina Bottin as Secretary
- Lina Bonivento as Aunt Giovanna
- Mino Doro as Prof. Bracci
- Giulio Calì as Il giovanottaccio
