= Filippo Cifariello =

Italian sculptor

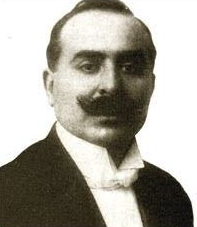
- Filippo Cifariello (1905)
- Born: July 3, 1864; Molfetta, Apulia, Italy
- Died: April 5, 1936 (aged 81); Naples, Campania, Italy
- Cause of death: Suicide by firearm
- Occupation: Sculptor
- Spouses: Maria de Browne (m. 1894; killed 1905) Evelina Fabbri (m. 1914; died 1914) Anna Marzell (m. 1928)
- Children: 2
- Parents: Ferdinando Cifariello (father); Giovanna née Rutigliano (mother)

Filippo Antonio Cifariello (3 July 1864 – 5 April 1936) was an Italian sculptor; primarily of small figures and busts.

== Biography ==
He was the first of five children born to Ferdinando Cifariello, a singer from Bari, and his wife, Giovanna née Rutigliano. While he was still a boy, his family moved to Naples where his father attempted, unsuccessfully, to promote his career and they fell into poverty. It was there, in an effort to support his family, that he began to display his artistic abilities. Eventually, he was able to enter the Accademia di Belle Arti di Napoli, where he studied with the painter, Gioacchino Toma. His interest in sculpture led him to spend some time in Rome and Munich.

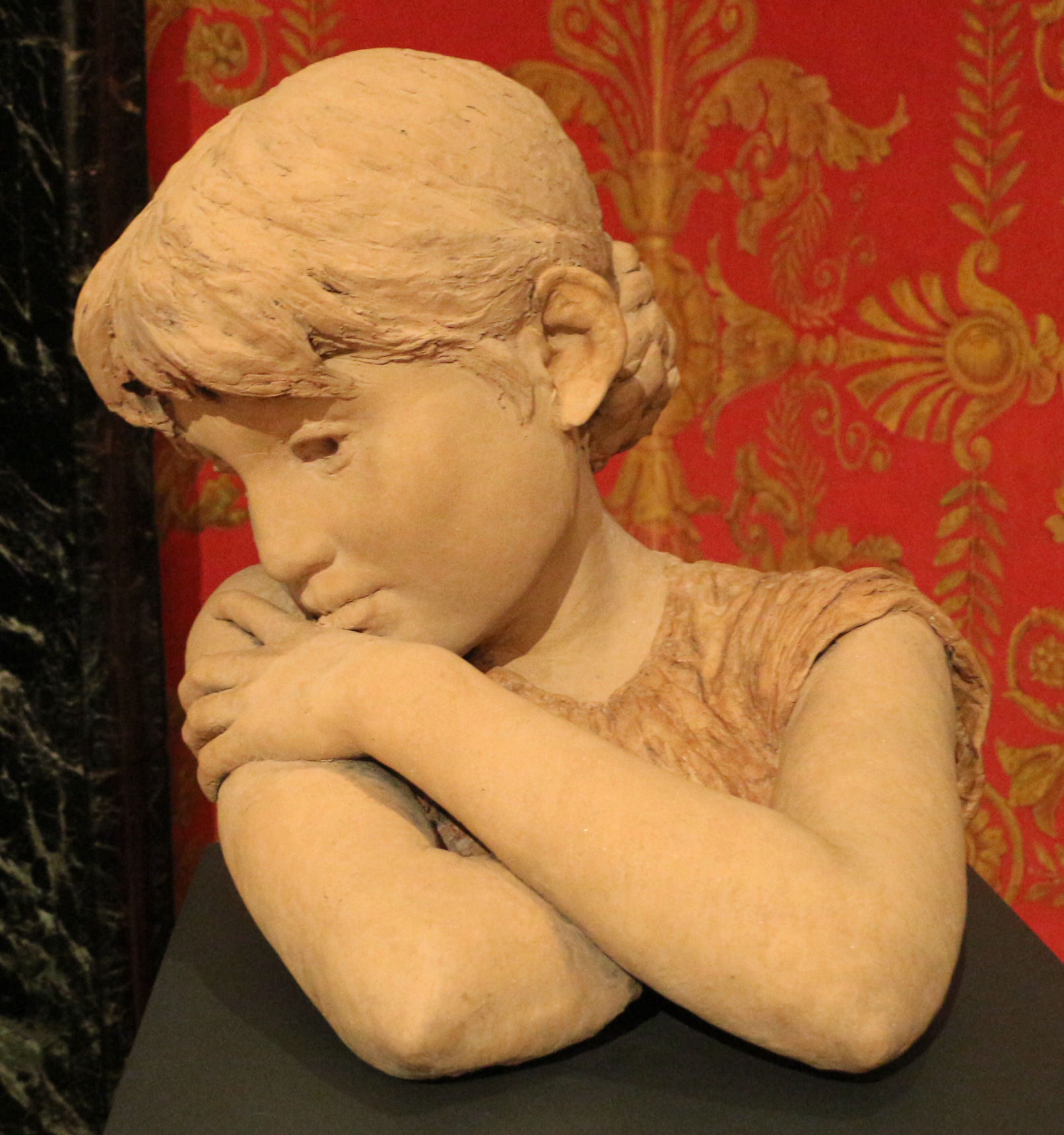
Primi Palpiti (First [Heart] Throbs), one of his earliest works

He was exhibiting regularly by 1881; receiving an award in Naples in 1883. His first true success came at the Exposition Universelle (1889), in Paris. After that, he lived in Rome. In 1899, he began exhibiting at the Venice Biennale. He was later named a Commander in the Order of the Crown of Italy.

In 1894, he married the French singer Maria de Browne; known by her stage name, Blanche de Mercy. The letters of admiration she received from her fans drove him to fits of jealousy. At one point, he accepted a position as Director of a factory that made art objects, in Passau, Germany, to take her away from Rome. She felt isolated there, and spent some time on an unsuccessful tour in the United States. They eventually returned to Rome. In 1905, he met her lawyer, who he suspected of being her lover, come out of their home. Following a serious quarrel, he bought a gun and, on August 10, killed her; shooting her five times with a revolver. He claimed that she had threatened him with a gun first.

His trial generated much publicity, with a strenuous defense by the lawyer, Gaetano Manfredi (1849–1912), in the assize court of Campobasso. After two years, he was acquitted for lack of imputability; roughly equivalent to temporary insanity. Upon being freed, he returned to Naples, where he was able to resume his career.

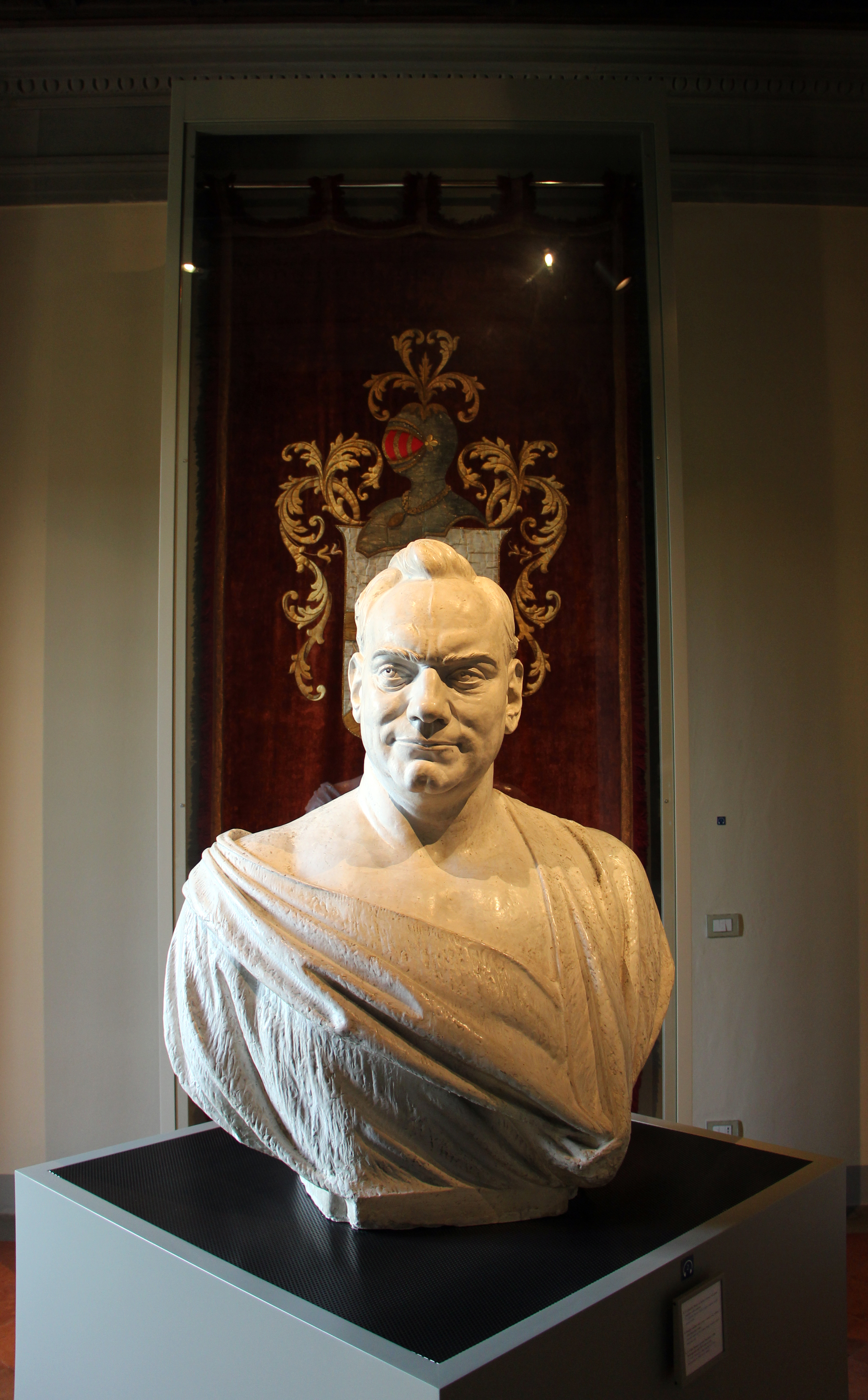
Bust of Enrico Caruso at the Museo Enrico Caruso in Lastra a Signa

His misfortunes continued in 1914 when his second wife, twenty-two-year-old Evelina Fabbri, whom he had married only three weeks before, died of severe burns caused by a spill from an alcohol stove. She survived long enough to clear him of any responsibility. In 1928, he married a third time, to Anna Marzell from Germany. They had two children, including the famous actor, Antonio Cifariello. In 1931, he wrote an autobiography: Tre vite in una (Three Lives in One), which was briefly popular. In his final years, he focused on portrait busts.

He suffered from serious bouts of depression, however, and committed suicide in his studio, by shooting himself in the head, at the age of eighty-one.
