= List of film scores by Nino Rota =

This is a list of 171 film scores by the Italian composer Nino Rota (1911–1979). The films are categorized by release date, the original title, English title, alternate title (other language, regional, theatrical or DVD title), and film director.

Date	Original title (Italian title)	English title	Alternate title	Director	Notes
1933	Treno popolare	Tourist Train		Raffaello Matarazzo	
1942	Giorno di nozze	Wedding Day		Raffaello Matarazzo	
1943	Il birichino di papà			Raffaello Matarazzo	
1944	Zazà	Zaza		Renato Castellani	
1944	La donna della montagna	The Mountain Woman		Renato Castellani	
1945	La freccia nel fianco	The Arrow		Alberto Lattuada; Mario Costa (uncredited)	
1945	Lo sbaglio di essere vivo	My Widow and I		Carlo Ludovico Bragaglia	
1945	Le miserie del signor Travet	His Young Wife		Mario Soldati	
1946	Vanità	Vanity		Giorgio Pàstina	
1946	La primula bianca			Carlo Ludovico Bragaglia	
1946	Un americano in vacanza	A Yank in Rome		Luigi Zampa	
1946	Albergo Luna, camera 34	Hotel Luna, Room 34		Carlo Ludovico Bragaglia	
1946	Mio figlio professore	Professor, My Son		Renato Castellani	
1946	Roma città libera	Rome, Free City	La notte porta consiglio	Marcello Pagliero	
1947	Il delitto di Giovanni Episcopo	Flesh Will Surrender		Alberto Lattuada	
1947	Daniele Cortis	Daniele Cortis	Elena	Mario Soldati	
1947	Come persi la guerra	How I Lost the War		Carlo Borghesio	
1947	Gli uomini sono nemici	Crossroads of Passion		Ettore Giannini	
1947	Il segreto di Don Giovanni	When Love Calls		Camillo Mastrocinque; Mario Costa	music also by Fernando Previtali
1947	Vivere in pace	To Live in Peace		Luigi Zampa	
1948	Totò al giro d'Italia	Toto Tours Italy		Mario Mattoli	
1948	Proibito rubare	Hey Boy	No Stealing; Guagilo	Luigi Comencini	
1948	Molti sogni per le strade	The Street Has Many Dreams	Woman Trouble	Mario Camerini	
1948	Sotto il sole di Roma	Under the Sun of Rome		Renato Castellani	
1948	Fuga in Francia	Escape to France	Flight into France	Mario Soldati	
1948	È primavera...	It's Forever Springtime	Springtime in Italy	Renato Castellani	
1948	Senza pietà	Without Pity		Alberto Lattuada	
1948	Arrivederci, papà!	Be Seeing You, Father		Camillo Mastrocinque	
1948	Amanti senza amore	Prelude to Madness		Gianni Franciolini	
1948	Anni difficili	Difficult Years	The Little Man	Luigi Zampa	
1948	L'eroe della strada			Carlo Borghesio	
1949	Quel bandito sono io	Her Favourite Husband	The Taming of Dorothy	Mario Soldati	
1949	The Glass Mountain	The Glass Mountain	La montagna di cristallo	Henry Cass; Edoardo Anton	
1949	Come scopersi l'America	How I Discovered America		Carlo Borghesio	
1949	Obsession	Obsession	The Hidden Room	Edward Dmytryk	
1949	I pirati di Capri	The Pirates of Capri	Captain Sirocco; The Masked Pirate	Edgar G. Ulmer; Giuseppe Maria Scotese	
1949	Campane a martello	Alarm Bells		Luigi Zampa	
1949	Children of Chance	Children of Chance		Luigi Zampa	
1950	Vita da cani	A Dog's Life	It's a Dog's Life	Mario Monicelli; Steno	
1950	Peppino e Violetta	Never Take No for an Answer	The Small Miracle	Maurice Cloche; Ralph Smart	
1950	Napoli milionaria!	Side Street Story		Eduardo De Filippo	
1950	È più facile che un cammello...	His Last Twelve Hours	Twelve Hours to Live	Luigi Zampa	
1950	È arrivato il cavaliere!			Mario Monicelli; Steno	
1950	Due mogli sono troppe	Honeymoon Deferred		Mario Camerini	
1950	Donne e briganti	Of Love and Bandits	The King's Guerrillas	Mario Soldati	
1951	Valley of Eagles	Valley of Eagles	Valley of the Eagles	Terence Young	
1951	Totò e i re di Roma	Toto and the King of Rome		Mario Monicelli; Steno	
1951	Il Monello della strada	Street Urchin		Carlo Borghesio	
1951	Le Meravigliose avventure di Guerrin Meschino	The Wonderful Adventures of Guerrin Meschino		Pietro Francisci	
1951	Napoleone	Napoleon		Carlo Borghesio	
1951	Filumena Marturano	Filumena Marturano		Eduardo De Filippo	
1951	Era lui... sì! sì!	It's Him!... Yes! Yes!		Marino Girolami; Marcello Marchesi; Vittorio Metz	
1951	Anna	Anna		Alberto Lattuada	
1952	Ragazze da marito			Eduardo De Filippo	
1952	I tre corsari	The Three Pirates	Three Corsairs	Mario Soldati	
1952	La mano dello straniero	The Stranger's Hand		Mario Soldati	
1952	Something Money Can't Buy	Something Money Can't Buy		Pat Jackson	
1952	I sette dell'orsa maggiore	Hell Raiders of the Deep	Human Torpedoes	Duilio Coletti	
1952	La regina di Saba	The Queen of Sheba		Pietro Francisci	
1952	Noi due soli	We Two Alone		Marino Girolami; Marcello Marchesi; Vittorio Metz	
1952	Marito e moglie	Husband and Wife		Eduardo De Filippo	
1952	Jolanda, la figlia del corsaro nero	Jolanda, the Daughter of the Black Corsair	Yolanda	Mario Soldati	
1952	Gli angeli del quartiere	The Angels of the Neighbourhood	Angels of the District	Carlo Borghesio	
1952	Due soldi di speranza	Two Cents Worth of Hope		Renato Castellani	music also by Alessandro Cicognini
1952	Un ladro in paradiso	A Thief in Paradise		Domenico Paolella	
1952	Lo sceicco bianco	The White Sheik		Federico Fellini	
1952	Venetian Bird	Venetian Bird	The Assassin	Ralph Thomas	
1953	Star of India	Star of India	Stella dell'India	Arthur Lubin	
1953	Scampolo 53	Scampolo 53		Giorgio Bianchi	
1953	Riscatto	Riscatto	Il Riscatto – Tu sei il mio giudice	Marino Girolami	
1953	La domenica della buona gente	Good Folk's Sunday		Anton Giulio Majano	
1953	Fanciulle di lusso	Finishing School; Luxury Girls	Des gosses de riches Les mondaines	Bernard Vorhaus	
1953	Gli uomini, che mascalzoni!	What Scoundrels Men Are		Glauco Pellegrini	remake of Mario Camerini's 1932 What Scoundrels Men Are!
1953	La nave delle donne maledette	The Ship of Condemned Women	Ship of Lost Women	Raffaello Matarazzo	
1953	Le boulanger de Valorgue	The Wild Oat		Henri Verneuil	
1953	I vitelloni	I Vitelloni	The Young and the Passionate	Federico Fellini	
1953	Anni facili	Easy Years		Luigi Zampa	
1953	Musoduro	The Hunt	Amore selvaggio	Giuseppe Bennati	
1953	L'Ennemi public n° 1	The Most Wanted Man	Public Enemy Number One; The Most Wanted Man in the World	Henri Verneuil	
1953	Via Padova 46		Lo scocciatore	Giorgio Bianchi	
1954	Vergine moderna	Modern Virgin		Marcello Pagliero	
1954	La grande speranza	Submarine Attack	Torpedo Zone; The Great Hope	Duilio Coletti	
1954	Le due orfanelle	The Two Orphans	Les deux orphelines	Giacomo Gentilomo	based on the play Les deux orphelines by Adolphe d'Ennery and Eugène Cormon
1954	Divisione Folgore	Folgore Division		Duilio Coletti	
1954	Cento anni d'amore: 1. "Garibaldina"; 2. "Pendolin"	100 Years of Love: 1. "Garibaldina"; 2. "Pendolin"		Lionello De Felice	omnibus film; music also by Mario Nascimbene and Teo Usuelli
1954	Appassionatamente	Appassionatamente		Giacomo Gentilomo	
1954	L'amante di Paride	Loves of Three Queens	The Face That Launched a Thousand Ships	Marc Allégret; Edgar G. Ulmer	
1954	La strada	La strada	The Road	Federico Fellini	
1954	Mambo	Mambo		Robert Rossen	music also by Angelo Francesco Lavagnino
1954	Ragazze al mare		In vacanza al mare	Giuliano Biagetti	
1954	Senso	Senso		Luchino Visconti	music by Anton Bruckner adapted by Rota
1954	Proibito	Forbidden		Mario Monicelli	
1955	Io piaccio		La via del successo con le donne	Giorgio Bianchi	
1955	Accadde al penitenziario			Giorgio Bianchi	
1955	Un eroe dei nostri tempi	A Hero of Our Times		Mario Monicelli	
1955	Bella non piangere!			Duilio Coletti; David Carbonari	
1955	Il bidone	The Swindle	The Swindlers	Federico Fellini	
1955	Amici per la pelle	Friends for Life	The Woman in the Painting	Franco Rossi	
1955	La bella di Roma	The Belle of Rome		Luigi Comencini	
1956	War and Peace	War and Peace		King Vidor	1957 Nastro d'Argento for Best Score winner
1956	Londra chiama Polo Nord	The House of Intrigue	London Calling North Pole	Duilio Coletti	
1956	Città di notte	City at Night		Leopoldo Trieste	
1957	Il medico e lo stregone	Doctor and the Healer	Le médecin et le sorcier	Mario Monicelli	
1957	Italia piccola			Mario Soldati	
1957	Il momento più bello	The Most Wonderful Moment	Wasted Lives	Luciano Emmer	
1957	Le notti bianche	White Nights		Luchino Visconti	1958 Nastro d'Argento for Best Score winner
1957	Le notti di Cabiria	Nights of Cabiria	Cabiria	Federico Fellini	music also by Pasquale Bonagura
1957	Viaggio nella valle del Po alla ricerca dei cibi genuini			Mario Soldati	TV documentary
1958	Giovani mariti	Young Husbands		Mauro Bolognini	
1958	Fortunella	Fortunella		Eduardo De Filippo	
1958	This Angry Age	This Angry Age	Barrage contre le Pacifique; The Sea Wall	René Clément	
1958	El Alamein (it)	Tanks of El Alamein	Deserto di gloria	Guido Malatesta	
1958	Gli italiani sono matti	The Italians They Are Crazy		Duilio Coletti; Luis María Delgado	
1958	La legge è legge	The Law Is the Law	La loi c'est la loi	Christian-Jaque	
1959	La grande guerra	The Great War		Mario Monicelli	
1959	Un ettaro di cielo	Piece of the Sky		Aglauco Casadio	
1960	Chi legge? Un viaggio lungo il Tirreno			Mario Soldati	TV miniseries documentary
1960	Plein soleil	Purple Noon	Blazing Sun; Full Sun; Lust for Evil	René Clément	based on the novel The Talented Mr. Ripley by Patricia Highsmith
1960	La dolce vita	La Dolce Vita	The Sweet Life	Federico Fellini	1961 Nastro d'Argento for Best Score winner
1960	Sotto dieci bandiere	Under Ten Flags		Duilio Coletti	
1960	Rocco e i suoi fratelli	Rocco and His Brothers	Rocco et ses frères	Luchino Visconti	
1961	Fantasmi a Roma	Ghosts of Rome	Phantom Lovers	Antonio Pietrangeli	
1961	Il brigante	The Brigand		Renato Castellani	
1962	Mafioso	Mafioso		Alberto Lattuada	music also by Piero Piccioni
1962	The Best of Enemies	The Best of Enemies	I due nemici	Guy Hamilton	
1962	The Reluctant Saint	The Reluctant Saint		Edward Dmytryk	
1962	Boccaccio '70: "Le tentazioni del dottor Antonio"	Boccaccio '70: "The Temptation of Dr. Antonio"		Federico Fellini	omnibus film
1962	Boccaccio '70: "Il lavoro"	Boccaccio '70: "The Job"		Luchino Visconti	omnibus film
1962	I sequestrati di Altona	The Condemned of Altona		Vittorio De Sica	based on the play by Jean-Paul Sartre; music actually used in the film is from the third movement of the Symphony No. 11 in G minor "Year 1905" by Dmitri Shostakovich
1962	L'isola di Arturo	Arturo's Island		Damiano Damiani	music also by Carlo Rustichelli; based on the novel by Elsa Morante
1963	Il Gattopardo	The Leopard		Luchino Visconti	
1963	8½ (Otto e mezzo)	8½	Federico Fellini's 8½	Federico Fellini	1964 Nastro d'Argento for Best Score winner
1963	Il maestro di Vigevano	The Teacher from Vigevano		Elio Petri	
1964–1965	Il giornalino di Gian Burrasca	Gian Burrasca's Diary		Lina Wertmüller	TV series in 8 episodes of 60 minutes
1964	A Midsummer Night's Dream	A Midsummer Night's Dream		Joan Kemp-Welch	TV film
1965	Oggi, domani, dopodomani: "L'ora di punta"	The Man, the Woman and the Money: "L'ora di punta"	Kiss the Other Sheik	Eduardo De Filippo	omnibus film
1965	Giulietta degli spiriti	Juliet of the Spirits		Federico Fellini	
1966	Spara forte, più forte, non capisco	Shoot Loud, Louder... I Don't Understand		Eduardo De Filippo	
1968	Much Ado About Nothing	Much Ado About Nothing		Alan Cooke	TV film based on the play by William Shakespeare
1967	La tormenta			Raúl Araiza	TV series
1967	The Taming of the Shrew	The Taming of the Shrew	La bisbetica domata	Franco Zeffirelli	based on the play by William Shakespeare
1968	Romeo and Juliet	Romeo and Juliet	William Shakespeare's Romeo and Juliet	Franco Zeffirelli	based on the play by William Shakespeare; 1969 Nastro d'Argento for Best Score winner
1968	Histoires extraordinaires: "Toby Dammit"	Spirits of the Dead: "Toby Dammit"	Tales of Mystery and Imagination	Federico Fellini	omnibus film of stories by Edgar Allan Poe
1969	Block-notes di un regista	Fellini: A Director's Notebook		Federico Fellini	TV documentary; episode of NBC Experiment in Television series
1969	Fellini – Satyricon	Fellini Satyricon	The Degenerates	Federico Fellini	music also by İlhan Mimaroğlu, Tod Dockstader, Andrew Rudin
1970	Paranoia	A Quiet Place to Kill	A Beautiful Place to Kill	Umberto Lenzi	music also by Gregorio García Segura
1970	Waterloo (Ватерлоо)	Waterloo		Sergei Bondarchuk	additional music by Wilfred Josephs
1971	I clowns	The Clowns	Les clowns; Die Clowns	Federico Fellini	TV film
1972	Roma	Roma	Fellini's Roma	Federico Fellini	
1972	The Godfather	The Godfather	Mario Puzo's The Godfather	Francis Ford Coppola	1972 Golden Globe Award for Best Original Score winner 1972 BAFTA Award for Best Film Music winner 1973 Grammy Award for Best Original Score Written for a Motion Picture or a Television Special winner 1972 Academy Award for Best Original Score nominee (later withdrawn)
1973	Hi wa shizumi, hi wa noboru (陽は沈み陽は昇る)	Sunset, Sunrise		Koreyoshi Kurahara	
1973	Amarcord	Amarcord	I Remember	Federico Fellini	
1973	Film d'amore e d'anarchia	Love and Anarchy		Lina Wertmüller	
1974	The Godfather Part II	The Godfather Part II	Mario Puzo's The Godfather Part II	Francis Ford Coppola	additional music by Carmine Coppola; 1974 Academy Award for Best Original Score winner
1974	The Abdication	The Abdication		Anthony Harvey	
1975	E il Casanova di Fellini?			Gianfranco Angelucci; Liliane Betti	TV documentary
1976	Ragazzo di Borgata	Slow Boy		Giulio Paradisi	music also by Carlo Savina
1976	Caro Michele	Caro Michele	Dear Michael	Mario Monicelli	
1976	Il Casanova di Federico Fellini	Fellini's Casanova	Casanova	Federico Fellini	1977 David di Donatello Award for Best Score winner
1976	Alle origini della mafia	Origins of the Mafia		Enzo Muzii	TV miniseries in 5 episodes of 50 minutes
1977	Il furto della Gioconda			Renato Castellani	TV miniseries
1977	Las alegres chicas de "El Molino"			José Antonio de la Loma	
1978	Prova d'orchestra	Orchestra Rehearsal	Federico Fellini's Orchestra Rehearsal	Federico Fellini	1979 Nastro d'Argento for Best Score winner
1978	Kontakt (Контакт)	Contact		Vladimir Tarasov	animated short film; 10 minutes
1978	Death on the Nile	Death on the Nile	Agatha Christie's Death on the Nile	John Guillermin	
1978	Il teatro di Eduardo			Eduardo De Filippo	TV film
1978	Quei figuri di tanti anni fa			Eduardo De Filippo	TV film
1978	La dodicesima Notte			Giorgio De Lullo	
1979	Le Comte de Monte-Cristo (1979 TV series)			Denys de La Patellière	TV miniseries in 4 episodes; music also by Carlo Savina
1979	Ten to Survive: 1. "Tutti i bambini" 2. "Handicap"	Ten to Survive: 1. "Tutti i bambini" 2. "Handicap"		Giancarlo Zagni; Arnoldo Farina	animated film produced by UNICEF and consisting of 10 episodes, 2 of which were set to music by Rota
1979	Hurricane	Hurricane	Forbidden Paradise	Jan Troell	

== See also ==
- List of compositions by Nino Rota
- Nino Rota discography
