= Pietro Pastore =

Italian footballer and film actor

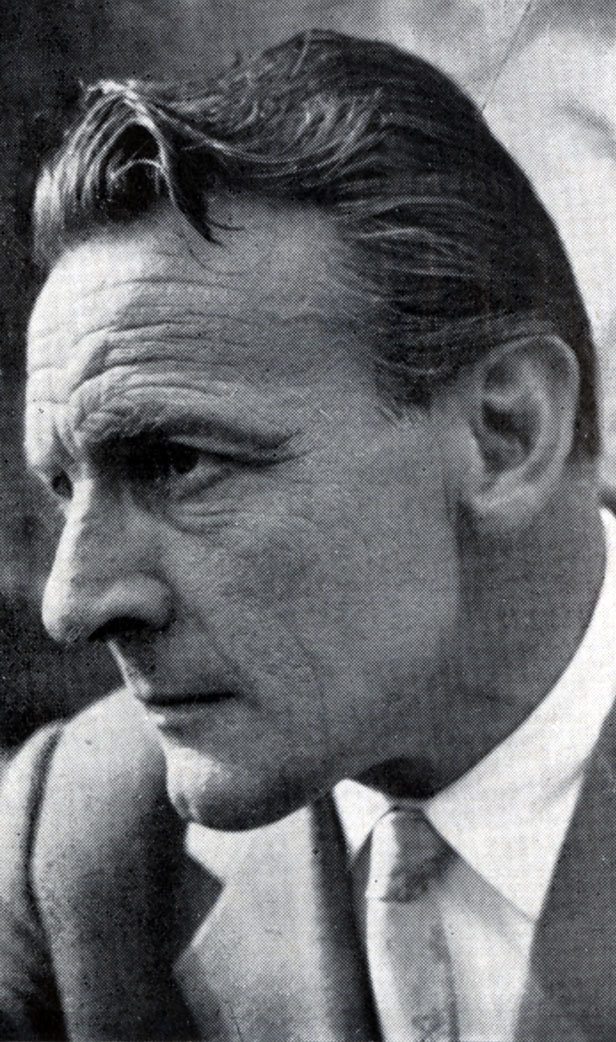

Personal information
- Full name: Pietro Mario Pastore
- Date of birth: 3 April 1903
- Place of birth: Padua, Italy
- Date of death: 8 January 1968 (aged 64)
- Place of death: Rome, Italy
- Position: Striker

Senior career*
Years	Team	Apps	(Gls)
1920–1923	Padova	20	(4)
1923–1927	Juventus	66	(54)
1927–1929	Milan	58	(39)
1929–1931	Lazio	57	(23)
1931–1932	Milan	30	(13)
1932–1934	Lazio	18	(9)
1934–1935	Perugia	15	(3)
1935–1936	Roma	4	(1)
1941–1942	Vigili Fuoco Roma		
Medal record
Representing Italy
Summer Olympics
Bronze medal – third place	Summer Olympics	1928 Amsterdam
- * Club domestic league appearances and goals

Pietro Mario Pastore, also known as Piero Pastore (3 April 1903 – 8 January 1968) was an Italian professional footballer who played as a striker; he later became an actor.

== Football career ==
Pastore was the youngest ever player to play for Juventus FC at the age of 15 years, 222 days. He played for 6 seasons (108 games, 46 goals) in the Serie A for SS Lazio, AC Milan and AS Roma. Pastore represented Italy at the 1928 Summer Olympics and won a bronze medal, but he did not play in any games.

== Acting career ==
After retirement, he became an actor; among other roles, he played small parts in Roman Holiday, Barabbas and War and Peace.

== Honours ==
=== Club ===
Juventus

- Italian Football Championship: 1925–26

=== International ===
Italy

- Olympic Bronze Medal: 1928

== Selected filmography ==
- Girls Do Not Joke (1929)
- La Leggenda di Wally (1930) - Hagenbach
- Ninna nanna delle dodici mamme (1930)
- Steel (1933) - Mario Velini
- Trois balles dans la peau (1934) - Policeman #2
- Port (1934) - Salvatore - il fidanzato di Maria
- Aldebaran (1935) - Sailor
- Territorial Militia (1935) - Il soldato Grotta
- Tredici uomini e un cannone (1936) - Uomo #7
- Tonight at Eleven (1938) - Willy
- Under the Southern Cross (1938) - Casale
- I, His Father (1939) - Sandro
- An Adventure of Salvator Rosa (1939) - Il quarto contadino
- Fanfulla da Lodi (1940) - Marco
- Fortuna (1940)
- The Siege of the Alcazar (1940) - (uncredited)
- Caravaggio, il pittore maledetto (1941)
- Orizzonte dipinto (1941)
- The Iron Crown (1941) - Sestio (uncredited)
- Black Gold (1942) - Marco, il marinaio
- Giarabub (1942) - Il tenente Martini
- Il fanciullo del West (1943) - William Donovan
- The Man with a Cross (1943) - Beyrov
- Il treno crociato (1943) - Corsi - detto 'Lanciafiamme' (uncredited)
- La donna della montagna (1944) - L'assistente di Rodolfo
- In High Places (1945) - Bottaccini (uncredited)
- Two Anonymous Letters (1945) - Il secondo reduco sul treno (uncredited)
- The Black Eagle (1946)
- Eleven Men and a Ball (1948)
- Anthony of Padua (1949) - Giano
- The Beggar's Daughter (1950)
- His Last Twelve Hours (1950) - Un sindacalista
- Il monello della strada (1950) - Un altro minatore
- Behind Closed Shutters (1951) - Cinque (uncredited)
- The Crossroads (1951) - De Vecchi
- Revenge of the Pirates (1951) - Escuedo
- Senza bandiera (1951)
- Lorenzaccio (1951)
- When in Rome (1952) - Customs Man (uncredited)
- Red Shirts (1952) - Pietro Fadini
- The Secret of Three Points (1952) - Riccardo Albertini
- The Captain of Venice (1952) - Barbaro Corazza
- The Three Pirates (1952) - Capitaine du Galion
- Roman Holiday (1953) - Faceless Man on the Barge (uncredited)
- Legione straniera (1953) - Il Baro ai Dadi
- Anni facili (1953)
- The Ship of Condemned Women (1953) - Pedro - un ufficiale
- Condannatelo! (1953)
- Ulysses (1954) - Leocrito (uncredited)
- Uomini ombra (1954) - (uncredited)
- Bread, Love and Jealousy (1954) - Minor Role (uncredited)
- Cardinal Lambertini (1954) - Papal messenger
- Loves of Three Queens (1954) - Simone (segment: The Face That Launched a Thousand Ships)
- Attila (1954) - Tribal Leader
- Too Bad She's Bad (1954) - L'infermiere (uncredited)
- The Art of Getting Along (1954) - Padre di Lilli (uncredited)
- Suonno d'ammore (1955) - The Fisherman Marcello
- Storia di una minorenne (1956)
- War and Peace (1956) - Bolkonsky's Servant (uncredited)
- The Knight of the Black Sword (1956) - Sebastiano
- Amaramente (1956) - Police Officer (uncredited)
- Operazione notte (1957)
- Engaged to Death (1957)
- Io, Caterina (1957)
- Toto and Marcellino (1958) - (uncredited)
- Gagliardi e pupe (1958) - Sor Ezio
- Carosello di canzoni (1958) - Direttore night club
- Fantasmi e ladri (1959) - The Police Officer Who Arrests Edmondo Natale (uncredited)
- World of Miracles (1959) - Un altro capostazione
- The Black Archer (1959) - Old conspirator
- General Della Rovere (1959) - Prisoner (uncredited)
- Simpatico mascalzone (1959) - sor Augusto
- Il raccomandato di ferro (1959) - The Furniture Dealer (uncredited)
- The Employee (1959) - The Office Clerk with a Pocket Handkerchief (uncredited)
- Carthage in Flames (1960)
- Gentlemen Are Born (1960)
- Goliath and the Dragon (1960) - Prison Guard
- The Giants of Thessaly (1960) - Cittadino di Jolco (uncredited)
- Sword in the Shadows (1961) - Guardia carceraria
- The Prisoner of the Iron Mask (1961)
- Some Like It Cold (1961) - Partisan at the Funeral (uncredited)
- Queen of the Seas (1961) - Protocol instructor
- Barabbas (1961) - Nicodemus (uncredited)
- Dieci italiani per un tedesco (Via Rasella) (1962)
- The Secret Mark of D'Artagnan (1962)
- Il naufrago del Pacifico (1962)
- Tiger of the Seven Seas (1962) - Pirate (uncredited)
- I Am Semiramis (1963) - Shabli
- The Invincible Masked Rider (1963) - Fratello dell'appestato
- Goliath and the Sins of Babylon (1963) - Farmer Witness
- Hercules and the Masked Rider (1963) - Prison's Head Guard
- Thunder of Battle (1964) - Furio
- Messalina vs. the Son of Hercules (1964) - British Ambassador (uncredited)
- Hercules, Prisoner of Evil (1964) - Amko
- Sword of the Empire (1964) - Ottavio
- El diablo también llora (1965)
- Me, Me, Me... and the Others (1966) - (uncredited)
- Wild, Wild Planet (1966) - Scientist on Planet Delfos
- Il pianeta errante (1966) - Older Officer at Conference
- La morte viene dal pianeta Aytin (1967) - Older Officer (final film role)
