= I Vitelloni =

1953 Italian comedy-drama film directed by Federico Fellini

- Italian theatrical release poster
- Directed by: Federico Fellini
- Screenplay by: Federico Fellini; Ennio Flaiano; Tullio Pinelli
- Story by: Federico Fellini; Tullio Pinelli
- Produced by: Lorenzo Pegoraro; Mario De Vecchi; Jacques Bar
- Starring: Alberto Sordi; Franco Fabrizi; Franco Interlenghi; Leopoldo Trieste
- Narrated by: Riccardo Cucciolla
- Cinematography: Carlo Carlini; Otello Martelli; Luciano Trasatti
- Edited by: Rolando Benedetti
- Music by: Nino Rota
- Production companies: Peg-Films; Cité Films
- Distributed by: ENIC (Italy); RKO Pictures (France)
- Release dates: 26 August 1953 (Venice); 17 September 1953 (Italy); 23 April 1954 (France)
- Running time: 108 minutes
- Countries: Italy; France
- Language: Italian

I Vitelloni (Italian pronunciation: [i vitelˈloːni], lit. "The Bullocks"; Romagnol slang for "The Slackers" or "The Layabouts") is a 1953 Italian comedy drama film directed by Federico Fellini from a screenplay written by himself, Ennio Flaiano, and Tullio Pinelli. It stars Franco Interlenghi, Alberto Sordi, Franco Fabrizi, Leopoldo Trieste, and Riccardo Fellini (the director's brother) as five young Italian men at crucial turning points in their small-town lives. Recognized as a pivotal work in Fellini's artistic evolution, the film has distinct autobiographical elements that mirror important societal changes in 1950s Italy.

Recipient of both the Venice Film Festival Silver Lion in 1953 and an Academy Award nomination for Best Writing in 1958, the film was also Fellini's first commercial success. In 2008, it was included on the Italian Ministry of Cultural Heritage's 100 Italian films to be saved, a list of 100 films that "have changed the collective memory of the country between 1942 and 1978".

== Plot ==
As summer draws to a close, a violent downpour interrupts a beachside beauty pageant in a provincial town on the Adriatic coast. Sandra Rubini, crowned "Miss Mermaid 1953", suddenly grows upset and faints: rumours fly that she's expecting a baby by inveterate skirt chaser Fausto Moretti. Under pressure from Francesco, his respectable father, Fausto agrees to a shotgun wedding. After the sparsely attended middle-class ceremony, the newlyweds leave to honeymoon in Rome.

Unemployed and living off their parents, Fausto's twenty-something year old friends kill time shuffling from empty cafés to seedy pool halls to aimless walks on desolate windswept beaches and perform childish pranks. After taunting road workers from the safety of a luxury car, they get thrashed when it breaks down.

Moraldo, Sandra's brother and the youngest of the five vitelloni, uncomfortably observes Fausto's womanizing as he ponders his own existence, dreaming of ways to escape to the city. Riccardo, a baritone, nourishes unrealistic ambitions to sing and act. Alberto, a daydreamer, is supported by his mother and self-reliant sister, Olga. Vulnerable and close to his mother, he's unhappy that Olga is secretly dating a married man. Leopoldo, an aspiring dramatist, writes a play that he discusses with Sergio Natali, an eccentric stage actor he hopes will perform in it.

Back from his honeymoon and settled in with Sandra, Fausto is forced to accept a job as a stockroom assistant in a religious-articles shop owned by Michele Curti, a friend of his father-in-law's. Incorrigible, Fausto pursues other women even in his wife's presence.

At the annual masquerade ball, Fausto is bedazzled by the mature beauty of Giulia Curti, his employer's wife. Alberto, in drag and drunk, executes a surrealistic dance across the ballroom floor with an oversize papier-mâché carnival head. Returning home at dawn, Alberto is devastated to find his sister running off for good with her lover. Fausto attempts to seduce Giulia, and is humiliated and fired by her husband. In revenge, he steals a statue of an angel in gold paint from Curti, enlisting Moraldo to help him attempt to sell it first to a convent and then to a monk. Suspicious, both turn him down. Fausto ends up leaving the statue with a simple-minded peasant who sets the angel on a mound outside his hovel, caressing it.

One evening after a variety show, Leopoldo agrees to accompany Natali on a walk along the seashore to discuss the merits of his play, but when Natali propositions him, he flees. Learning of Fausto's one-night stand with a variety performer, Sandra runs away from home, taking the baby with her. Riccardo, Alberto, Leopoldo, and Moraldo all join in Fausto's desperate search for his wife and child. When they find her at Fausto's father's home, Francesco pulls off his belt in a rage and whips his son. Later, reconciled for the present, Fausto and Sandra walk home happily and with optimism about their life together. Resolved to abandon the provincial monotony of his dead-end town, Moraldo boards a train, imagining his vitelloni friends sleeping and dreaming their lives away.

== Cast ==
- Franco Interlenghi as Moraldo Rubini
- Alberto Sordi as Alberto
- Franco Fabrizi as Fausto Moretti
- Leopoldo Trieste as Leopoldo Vannucci
- Riccardo Fellini as Riccardo
- Leonora Ruffo as Sandra Rubini, Moraldo's sister
- Jean Brochard as Francesco Moretti, Fausto's father
- Claude Farell as Olga, Alberto's sister
- Carlo Romano as Signore Michele Curti
- Lída Baarová as Signora Giulia Curti
- Enrico Viarisio as Signore Rubini, Moraldo's father
- Paola Borboni as Signora Rubini, Moraldo's mother
- Achille Majeroni as Sergio Natali
- Arlette Sauvage as mysterious woman at the cinema
- Silvio Bagolini as simple-minded peasant
- Vira Silenti as Gisella
- Maja Nipora as Caterina, the soubrette
- Gigetta Morano as Alberto's mother
- Guido Martufi as Guido
- Silvio Bagolini as Giudizio
- Milvia Chianelli as Maria
- Lilia Landi as herself
- Riccardo Cucciolla as the voice of the narrator

== Production ==
=== Writing ===
Having completed an early version of La Strada with co-screenwriter Tullio Pinelli in 1952, Fellini offered their "modern fairy tale" to producer Luigi Rovere, with whom he was still under contract. Rovere had solid reasons for turning it down: La Strada was in no recognizable genre and Fellini's last film, The White Sheik, had been a critical and commercial flop. In a show of solidarity, Rovere loaned the script to a Venetian professor of calligraphy turned film producer, Lorenzo Pegoraro, who admired The White Sheik. Convinced that La Strada would never attract an audience, Pegoraro requested that Fellini develop a comedy instead. Biographers differ as to who conceived I Vitelloni. For Tullio Kezich, Fellini hit on the idea "after an afternoon-long consultation" with Ennio Flaiano. For Hollis Alpert, Pinelli brainstormed with Fellini and Flaiano and came up "with a notion the other two liked: the pleasures and frustrations of growing up in a provincial town". Under Fellini's supervision, the three rapidly wrote the script together, pooling their adolescent memories and inventing others.

=== Title ===
Distributors interested in the script demanded a title change: incomprehensible to a general audience, I Vitelloni was a liability to an already risky venture. But Fellini refused to change it, having chosen the title after "being called a vitellone by an elderly woman expressing disapproval of one of his pranks". For him, vitelloni were "the unemployed of the middle class, mother's pets. They shine during the holiday season, and waiting for it takes up the rest of the year". According to biographer Alpert, the term is Romagnol for "veal, or calf ... used to refer to callow youths". Today, the term is widely translated as "big calves".

The term has also been defined as a cross between the Italian words for veal (vitello) and beef (bovino), implying "an immature, lazy person without a clear identity or any notion of what to do with his life". In a 1971 letter, Flaiano offered a fuller definition: "The term vitellone was used in my day to define a young man from a modest family, perhaps a student—but one who had either already gone beyond the programmed schedule for his coursework, or one who did nothing all the time ... I believe the term is a corruption of the word vudellone, the large intestine, or a person who eats a lot. It was a way of describing the family son who only ate but never 'produced'—like an intestine, waiting to be filled."

=== Casting ===
Fellini once again cast Alberto Sordi in a major role, despite Sordi's reputation as box-office poison and against Pegoraro's express wishes. Intent on playing the lead, however, Sordi didn't accept Fellini's offer until later in production. Pegoraro's skeptical distributors, far from closing the deal, demanded a clause in the contract banning Sordi's name from theatrical posters. Making matters worse, Fellini also cast Leopoldo Trieste (the lead in The White Sheik) as the budding dramatist, and his brother Riccardo, a total unknown, to interpret his own role. Further unknowns included Franco Interlenghi and Leonora Ruffo, who had just wrapped The Queen of Sheba. Although Czech actress Lída Baarová had a cult following, she was more famous for her love affair with Nazi Joseph Goebbels than for any of her film roles. Fellini topped things off by casting Franco Fabrizi as Fausto, an actor who had begun his film career in 1950 with Michelangelo Antonioni's Chronicle of a Love but had recently bombed in Christ Passed by the Barn. Pressured by his financial backers, a Florentine business group and the Paris-based Cité Film, Pegoraro finally balked at the lack of a star. "Sordi makes people run away", he complained to Fellini. "Leopoldo Trieste is a nobody. Meet me halfway—bring in a name."

To placate him, Fellini contacted Vittorio De Sica, hoping to convince him to play Sergio Natali, the aging actor. When Fellini outlined the role's homosexual overtones, De Sica accepted, provided it was written with "a great deal of humanity". In the end, he rejected the offer, "concerned about being marked as actually gay". Fellini then decided that De Sica would have been "too nice, too fascinating, too distracting", and cast Achille Majeroni, a respected stage actor.

=== Filming and editing ===
Described as an "itinerant production", shooting was tailored to accommodate Sordi's variety show schedule, requiring Fellini and his troupe to follow him from town to town across Italy. On tour in the Big Ruckus, Sordi rehearsed his role and was ready for filming during his hours off. Accordingly, when he toured Florence, shooting began as an all-night party at the city's Teatro Goldoni in early December 1952. Supervised by production manager Luigi Giacosi, whom Fellini had first met on location in Tripoli during the war, and photographed by veteran cinematographer Otello Martelli, the rushes served as the basis of the masquerade ball, a major sequence. With a break in production for Christmas, shooting resumed on January 15, 1953. Constrained by the shoestring budget, many scenes were shot in a natural decor. In Ostia, a quay provided the winter setting for Fausto and his gang to wander around listlessly staring at the sea. In Fiumicino, the terrace of the Kursaal Hotel was the backdrop for the beauty pageant that opens the film. Accustomed to movies produced on promises, Giacosi maintained morale by ensuring that cast and crew dined at the best restaurants in the towns they visited.

Working with several cinematographers over six months, Fellini developed a camera style based on slow tracking shots that "match the listless, purposeless lives" of his characters. The camera often dollies in to underscore dramatic events, most notably when Sandra falls ill at the beauty pageant; after the birth of her child; and when Francesco beats his son.

With editor Rolando Benedetti, Fellini established a rhythm in which short sequences are separated by abrupt cuts while longer sequences use dissolves. The numerous brief and disparate episodes "governed by their own internal logic" are thus held together by a particular editing pattern. A freeze-frame was used to immobilize the young Guido, Moraldo's friend, at the end of the film, as he balances himself on a railroad track.

== Critical response ==
Italy and France

Screened in competition at the 14th Venice International Film Festival on 26 August 1953, the film received the Silver Lion from the poet Eugenio Montale, who headed the jury, along with a public ovation and acclaim from the majority of critics. "Belying all doubts about its appeal", the film opened on September 17, 1953, to both commercial and critical success.

Writing for La Stampa, Mario Gromo called it a "film of a certain importance because of its many intelligent moments, its sound portrayal of provincial life, and because it is the second film of a young director who evidently has considerable talent ... The Italian film industry now has a new director and one who puts his own personal ideas before any of the customary traditions of the trade. Fellini's is a fresh approach". "It is the atmosphere that counts most in this unusual film," wrote Francesco Càllari of the Gazzetta del Lunedì, "an intensely human and poetical atmosphere altogether estranged from the provincialism of the setting ... Fellini has something to say and he says it with an acute sense of observation ... Here is someone apart from the other young directors of post-war Italian cinema. Fellini has a magical touch." After praising Fellini's Venice triumph, Ermanno Contini of Il Secolo XIX outlined the film's weaknesses: "I Vitelloni does not have a particularly solid structure, the story is discontinuous, seeking unity through the complex symbiosis of episodes and details ... The narrative, built up around strong emotions and powerful situations, lacks solid organic unity, and at times this undermines the story's creative force, resulting in an imbalance of tone and pace and a certain sense of tedium. But such shortcomings are amply atoned for by the film's sincerity and authenticity." Arturo Lanocita of Corriere della Sera wrote: "I Vitelloni gives a graphic and authentic picture of certain aimless evenings, the streets populated by groups of idle youths ... The film is a series of annotations, hints, and allusions without unity ... With a touch of irony, Fellini tries to show the contrast between the way his characters see themselves and the way they really are. Despite its weaknesses, the film is one of the best in recent years." For Giulio Cesare Castello of Cinema VI, the film proved "that Fellini is the Italian film industry's most talented satirist, and an acute observer and psychologist of human behaviour. Like any good moralist, he knows how to give his story a meaning, to provide more than just simple entertainment".

Fellini's first film with international distribution, I Vitelloni did reasonable box office in Britain and North America while performing "huge in Argentina". Opening in France on 23 April 1954, it was especially well received. André Martin of Les Cahiers du Cinéma wrote that by "virtue of the quality of the narrative, and the balance and control of the film as a whole, I Vitelloni is neither commercial nor does it possess those traits that usually permit a work of art to be consecrated and defined. With a surprising and effective sense of cinema, Fellini endows his characters with a life both simple and real". Film critic Geneviève Agel appreciated the symbolism: "Fellini films a deserted piazza at nighttime. It symbolizes solitude, the emptiness that follows communal joy, the bleak torpor that succeeds the swarming crowd; there are always papers lying around like so many reminders of what the day and life have left behind." The film ranked 6th on Cahiers du Cinéma's Annual Top 10 List in 1954.

United States

I Vitelloni, distributed by Janus Films, opened in the United States on 7 November 1956 to generally positive reviews. In his New York Times review, Bosley Crowther reported that Fellini, with "his volatile disposition and a desire to make a stinging film... does certainly take a vigorous whiplash to the breed of over-grown and over-sexed young men who hang around their local poolrooms and shun work as though it were a foul disease. He ridicules them with all the candor of his sharp neo-realist style, revealing their self-admiration to be sadly immature and absurd. And without going into reasons for the slack state of these young men, he indicates that they are piteous and merit some sympathy too". For John Simon, Nino Rota's music was one "of the most brilliant features of the film ... The first [of its two main themes] is a soaring, romantic melody that can be made to express nostalgia, love, and the pathos of existence ... Slowed down, [the second main theme] becomes lugubrious; with eerie figurations in the woodwinds it turns sinister. The quicksilver changes in the music support the changing moods of the story".

The film was re-released internationally on the tenth anniversary of Fellini's death in 2003. For the San Francisco Chronicle, Mick LaSalle noted that I Vitelloni was "a film of sensitivity, observation and humor—a must-see for Fellini enthusiasts and a worthwhile investment for everyone else. Those less taken by the maestro may find I Vitelloni to be a favorite among his works". Michael Wilmington of the Chicago Tribune wrote: "In Italy, it remains one of Fellini's most consistently loved movies. It should be in America as well ... If you still remember that terrific drunk scene, Alberto Sordi's pre-Some Like It Hot drag tango or the way the little boy balances on the train track at the end, you should know that this picture plays as strongly now as it did in 1956 or whenever you first saw it. I know I had a ball watching I Vitelloni again. It reminded me of the old gang." A. O. Scott of the New York Times wrote that the film "shows all of Fellini's unrivaled virtues—his lyrical sense of place, his abiding affection for even the most hapless of his characters, his effortless knack for limpid, bustling composition—and very few of his putative vices."

On the review aggregator website Rotten Tomatoes, I Vitelloni has an approval rating of 100% based on 28 reviews, with an average score of 9.1/10. Metacritic, which uses a weighted average, assigned the film a score of 87 out of 100, based on 10 critics, indicating "universal acclaim".

=== Influence ===
One of Fellini's most imitated films, I Vitelloni inspired European directors Juan Antonio Bardem, Marco Ferreri, and Lina Wertmüller, and influenced Martin Scorsese's Mean Streets (1973), George Lucas's American Graffiti (1973), and Joel Schumacher's St. Elmo's Fire (1985), among many others, according to Kezich. These include Philip Kaufman's The Wanderers (1979). While Barry Levinson's Diner (1982) features a similar group of young men, Levinson said he had not seen I Vitelloni before making it.

In a 1963 edition of Cinema magazine, director Stanley Kubrick cited the film as one of his 10 favourites.

== Awards ==
Wins

- Venice Film Festival: Silver Lion; Federico Fellini; 1953.
- Italian National Syndicate of Film Journalists: Silver Ribbon; Best Director, Federico Fellini; Best Producer; Best Supporting Actor, Alberto Sordi; 1954.

Nominations

- Venice Film Festival: Golden Lion; Federico Fellini; 1953.
- Academy Awards: Oscar; Best Writing, Story and Screenplay – Written Directly for the Screen, Federico Fellini (screenplay/story), Ennio Flaiano (screenplay/story) and Tullio Pinelli (story); 1958.
