= Due sul pianerottolo =

- Directed by: Mario Amendola
- Written by: Mario Amendola; Bruno Corbucci
- Produced by: Luigi Rovere
- Cinematography: Aldo Giordani
- Edited by: Antonio Siciliano
- Music by: Guido & Maurizio De Angelis
- Release date: 31 March 1976
- Country: Italy
- Language: Italian

Due sul pianerottolo is a 1976 Italian comedy film written and directed by Mario Amendola. It is based on a successful comedy play with the same name starred by the same cast.

== Cast ==
- Erminio Macario: Prof. Luigi Savoia
- Rita Pavone: Guglielmina 'Mimma' Castigliano
- Margherita Fumero: Margherita Boccioni Stagno
- Gianni Agus: Dr. Gianni Tagliolini
- Mario Carotenuto: Vespasiano Baudolino
- Enzo Liberti: Brigadiere Icardi
- Franco Agostini: Ettore Baudolino
- Renzo Marignano
- Luca Sportelli

== See also ==
- List of Italian films of 1976
