= Nando Bruno =

Italian actor (1895–1963)

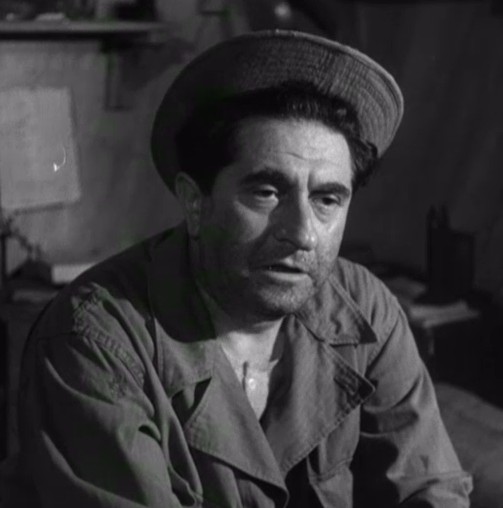
- Nando Bruno in How I Lost the War (1948)
- Born: Fernando Bruno; 6 October 1895; Rome, Kingdom of Italy
- Died: 10 April 1963 (aged 67); Rome, Italy
- Occupation: Actor
- Years active: 1938-1961

Nando Bruno (6 October 1895 – 10 April 1963) was an Italian film actor. He appeared in 84 films between 1938 and 1961. He was born in Rome, Italy and he died there.

== Selected filmography ==
- A Lady Did It (1938) - Un collego di Pasquale
- Le sorprese del divorzio (1939) - L'artificiere
- Montevergine (1939) - Francesco
- Dora Nelson (1939) - Gegè
- Mare (1940) - Il pescatore
- Incanto di mezzanotte (1940)
- L'imprevisto (1940)
- Two Hearts Among the Beasts (1943) - Il "piccolo gigante"
- Silenzio, si gira! (1943) - Un gioccatore di dadi sul set
- Gli assi della risata (1943) - Tentotti (segment "Il trionfo di Poppea") (uncredited)
- The Last Wagon (1943) - Augusto Pallotta, il vetturino
- Life Begins Anew (1945) - Scorcelletti, il camionista
- Rome, Open City (1945) - Agostino the Sexton
- Departure at Seven (1946)
- Mio figlio professore (My Son, the Professor) (1946) - Angeloni
- Rome, Free City (1946) - Il ladro
- To Live in Peace (1947) - Il Segretario Politico
- Flesh Will Surrender (1947) - Antonio
- L'onorevole Angelina (1947) - Pasquale Bianchi
- Christmas at Camp 119 (1947) - La guida di Roma
- Lost Youth (1948) - Il commissario
- How I Lost the War (1948) - Checco Tremelloni
- Bicycle Thieves (1948) - (uncredited)
- Immigrants (1948) - Gigi
- The Flame That Will Not Die (1949)
- La sposa non può attendere (1949) - Venturi
- Twenty Years (1949)
- Se fossi deputato (1949) - Armando Proietti
- I peggiori anni della nostra vita (1950) - Flavio
- Ring Around the Clock (1950) - Parboni
- Women and Brigands (1950) - Beato
- Sambo (1950) - Romolo Cicerchia
- Rome-Paris-Rome (1951) - Riccardo
- Una bruna indiavolata! (1951) - Autista taxi
- Trieste mia! (1951)
- Hello Elephant (1952) - Signor Venturi, landlord
- Stranger on the Prowl (1952)
- Beauties in Capri (1952) - Don Violante
- At Sword's Edge (1952) - Bruno
- Five Paupers in an Automobile (152) - Battista
- Terminal Station (1953) - Railroad worker (uncredited)
- The Enchanting Enemy (1953)
- Too Young for Love (1953) - Commisario
- One of Those (1953) - Italo
- Buon viaggio pover'uomo (1953) - Saletti
- Ivan, Son of the White Devil (1953) - Boris
- Scampolo 53 (1953)
- Lasciateci in pace (1953)
- Two Nights with Cleopatra (1954) - Legionario
- A Slice of Life (1954) - Tassista (segment "Il pupo")
- Papà Pacifico (1954) - Augusto Ceccacci
- The Steel Rope (1954) - Checco
- Prima di sera (1954) - Antoni - the police commissioner
- La bella Otero (1954)
- The Art of Getting Along (1954) - (uncredited)
- Le signorine dello 04 (1955) - Angry Client
- The Last Five Minutes (1955) - Il portiere
- Destination Piovarolo (1955) - Il sacrestano
- Racconti romani (1955) - Annibale
- Cortile (1955) - Amedeo
- Tragic Ballad (1955) - Commisario
- La banda degli onesti (1956) - Maresciallo Denti (uncredited)
- L'intrusa (1956) - Carabinieres' Marshal
- I giorni più belli (1956)
- Due sosia in allegria (1956)
- Donne amori e matrimoni (1956) - Il maresciallo
- Parola di ladro (1957) - Guardiano notturno
- La ragazza del Palio (1957) - The Car Mechanic
- Primo applausio (1957)
- Fortunella (1958) - The American
- Ladro lui, ladra lei (1958) - Maresciallo Clemente
- È arrivata la parigina (1958) - Carlo
- The Love Specialist (1958) - Concierge
- Three Strangers in Rome (1958) - Vincenzo, Sergio's father
- Mogli pericolose (1958) - The Taxi Driver
- Sorrisi e canzoni (1958) - Capo muratore
- Everyone's in Love (1959) - Cesare
- I Tartassati (1959) - L'ubriaco
- Piove (1959) - Il commendatore Filippo Proietti
- La cento chilometri (1959) - Nando
- Il vedovo (1959) - Zio Armando
- Gastone (1960) - Michele
- Il Mattatore (1960) - Owner of big restaurant
- The Traffic Policeman (1960) - cognato di Otello
- Madri pericolose (1960) - Paolo Rossi
- Ravishing (1960) - Official at Rome Airport
- Time Out for Love (1961) - Buccieri
- Sua Eccellenza si fermò a mangiare (1961) - The Innkeeper
- The Joy of Living (1961) - Maresciallo
- Totò di notte n. 1 (1962)
