= Luigi Rovere =

Italian film producer

- Born: 30 June 1908; Acqui Terme, Italy
- Died: 20 October 1996 (aged 88); Rome, Lazio, Italy
- Occupation: Producer
- Years active: 1941-1976 (film)

Luigi Rovere (June 30, 1908 – October 20, 1996) was an Italian film producer.

== Selected filmography ==
- How I Lost the War (1947)
- Bullet for Stefano (1947)
- L'eroe della strada (1948)
- In the Name of the Law (1949)
- How I Discovered America (1949)
- Path of Hope (1950)
- Il monello della strada (1950)
- Napoleon (1951)
- Shadows on the Grand Canal (1951)
- Il bivio (1951)
- Lorenzaccio (1951)
- Behind Closed Shutters (1951)
- The Bandit of Tacca Del Lupo (1952)
- The White Sheik (1952)
- Puccini (1953)
- Symphony of Love (1954)
- Rommel's Treasure (1955)
- We Stole a Tram (1956)
- Account Rendered (1957)
- Toto and Marcellino (1958)
- Night Train to Milan (1962)
- Agostino (1962)
- Terror of the Steppes (1964)
- Hercules of the Desert (1964)
- Giant of the Lost Tomb (1964)
- Desert Raiders (1964)
- Imperfect Murder (1966)
- Me, Me, Me... and the Others (1966)
- Man, Pride and Vengeance (1967)
- I Protect Myself Against My Enemies (1969)
- A Sword for Brando (1970)
- Ma chi t'ha dato la patente? (1970)
- Armiamoci e partite! (1971)
- Don Camillo e i giovani d'oggi (1972)
- City Under Siege (1974)
- Due sul pianerottolo (1976)
- The Black Corsair (1976)

== Bibliography ==
- Tullio Kezich. Federico Fellini: His Life and Work. I.B.Tauris, 2007.
