= How I Discovered America =

1949 film

- Italian theatrical release poster
- Directed by: Carlo Borghesio
- Written by: Carlo Borghesio; Leo Benvenuti; Mario Amendola; Mario Monicelli; Steno
- Produced by: Luigi Rovere
- Starring: Erminio Macario; Carlo Ninchi; Delia Scala
- Cinematography: Mario Albertelli
- Edited by: Rolando Benedetti
- Music by: Nino Rota
- Production company: Lux Film
- Distributed by: Lux Film
- Release date: 1949
- Running time: 89 minutes
- Country: Italy
- Language: Italian

How I Discovered America (Italian: Come scopersi l'America) is a 1949 Italian comedy film directed by Carlo Borghesio and starring Erminio Macario, Carlo Ninchi and Delia Scala.

== Plot ==
Italy, late 1940s. A young unemployed guy and a wily tramp move to South America in search of fortune, but after several misadventures, they will eventually decide to return to Italy.

== Cast ==
- Erminio Macario as Cristoforo Colombo
- Carlo Ninchi as Gaetano
- Delia Scala as Lisa
- Folco Lulli as Signorotto
- Nino Pavese as Il capo compagnia
- Nunzio Filogamo as The Priest
- Dario Michaelis as Lisa's Fiancee
- Alfredo Rizzo as A Nazist
- Carlo Rizzo as A Nazist
- Pina Gallini as La sudamericana
