= Carlo Ninchi =

Italian actor (1896–1974)

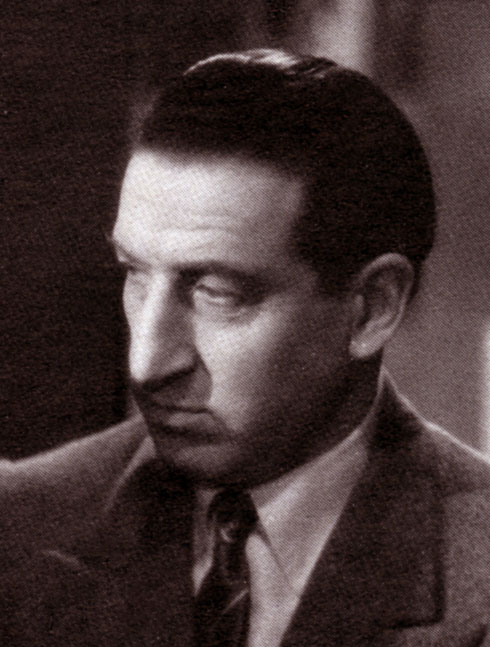
- Ninchi in the movie Catene invisibili (1942)
- Born: 31 May 1896; Bologna, Kingdom of Italy
- Died: 27 April 1974 (aged 77); Milan, Italy
- Occupation: Actor
- Years active: 1931–1963

Carlo Ninchi (31 May 1896 – 27 April 1974) was an Italian film actor. He appeared in more than 120 films between 1931 and 1963.

== Selected filmography ==
- Before the Jury (1931) – Marcello Barra, il guardacaccia
- Mother Earth (1931) – Il commandatore Bordani
- La stella del cinema (1931)
- La scala (1931) – Avvocato Giulio Terpi – suo marito
- Il solitario della montagna (1931)
- La Wally (1932) – Hagenbach
- Red Passport (1935) – Un passeggero sul 'Santa Fe'
- I Love You Only (1936) – Cesare Baldi
- Conquest of the Air (1936) – Gabriele Adanti di Perugia (uncredited)
- Scipio Africanus: The Defeat of Hannibal (1937) – Lelius
- Cavalleria rusticana (1939) – Alfio
- La conquista dell'aria (1939) – Gabriello Danti
- Dora Nelson (1939) – Giovanni Ferrari
- Scandalo per bene (1940) – Marco Alviano, mercante di vetri
- L'uomo della legione (1940) – Un legionario
- L'arcidiavolo (1940) – Il capitano Fares
- La fanciulla di Portici (1940) – Tommaso 'Masaniello' Aniello
- Lucrezia Borgia (1940) – Ranuccio
- Marco Visconti (1941) – Marco Visconti
- Turbine (1941) – Carlo Rinaldi
- The King's Jester (1941) – Il conte di Saint Vallier
- The Betrothed (1941) – L'Innominato
- La leggenda della primavera (1941)
- Captain Tempest (1942) – Moulia El Kader, il "Leone di Damasco"
- Tragic Night (1942) – Stefano
- The Lion of Damascus (1942) – Moulia El Kader, Il "leone di Damasco"
- Invisible Chains (1942) – Carlo Danieli
- Giarabub (1942) – Il maggiore Castagna
- Miliardi, che follia! (1942)
- Luisa Sanfelice (1942) – Il banchiere Gerardo Bacher
- La morte civile (1942) – Corrado
- I due Foscari (1942) – Il doge Francesco Foscari
- Nothing New Tonight (1942) – Cesare Manti
- Odessa in Flames (1942) – Il capitano Sergio Teodorescu
- La valle del diavolo (1943) – Il capitano medico Hansel
- Two Suffer Better Than One (1943) – Roberto Lanzi
- Lively Teresa (1943) – Carlo Mari, padre di Alberto
- Tutta la vita in ventiquattr'ore (1943) – Il commissario
- La signora in nero (1943) – Franco Dossi
- Lacrime di sangue (1944) – Pietro
- The Za-Bum Circus (1944) – (segments "Contatto telefonici" and "Galop finale al circo")
- The Gates of Heaven (1945) – L'accompagnatore del cieco
- The Ten Commandments (1945) (segment "Io sono il Signore Dio tuo")
- Two Anonymous Letters (1945) – Rossini
- The Song of Life (1945) – Padron Cesare
- O sole mio (1946) – Il fratello di Clara
- The Adulteress (1946) – Dante Viburzi
- Desire (1946) – Giovanni Mirelli
- The Lovers (1946) – Le prince-neveu
- The Ways of Sin (1946) – Don Sebastiano Pinna
- Tempesta d'anime (1946)
- Last Love (1947) – Il cappelano
- The White Primrose (1947) – Capo Banda
- The Captain's Daughter (1947) – Zurin
- Bullet for Stefano (1947) – Don Morini
- The Courier of the King (1947) – Il marchese de la Mole
- Fire Over the Sea (1947) – Stefano
- Call of the Blood (1948) – Salvatore
- Sono io l'assassino (1948)
- Un mese d'onestà (1948) – Procuratore generale Valdes
- L'isola di Montecristo (1948) – Mania
- L'eroe della strada (1948) – Gaetano
- I contrabbandieri del mare (1948) – Maresciallo
- I cavalieri dalle maschere nere (1948) – Duca Coriolano
- Toto Tours Italy (1948) – Dante Alighieri
- Il corriere di ferro (1948) – Buc, detto 'il corriere di ferro'
- The Earth Cries Out (1949) – Comandante della nave
- Fabiola (1949) – Galba
- Totò Le Mokò (1949) – Pépé le Moko
- Hand of Death (1949) – Simone Bossi
- The Iron Swordsman (1949) – Conte Ugolino della Gherardesca
- How I Discovered America (1949) – Gaetano
- Captain Demonio (1950)
- Son of d'Artagnan (1950) – Maresciallo D'Artagnan
- Beauty and the Devil (1950) – Le Prince
- Night Taxi (1950) – Forenti, l'industriale
- The Bread Peddler (1950) – Jacques Garaud a.k.a. Paul Harmant
- Side Street Story (1950) – Il brigadiere di Ps
- Songs in the Streets (1950) – Carlone
- The Lion of Amalfi (1950) – Roberto il Guiscardo
- Bluebeard's Six Wives (1950) – Nick Parter
- Rapture (1950)
- The Devil in the Convent (1950) – Milone
- Beauties on Bicycles (1951) – L'impresario
- Without a Flag (1951) – Il Comandante
- Cameriera bella presenza offresi... (1951) – Il sacerdote
- Fiamme sulla laguna (1951)
- Messalina (1951) – Tauro / Taurus
- Amor non ho... però... però (1951) – Maurizio
- Four Red Roses (1951) – Gustavo Leandri
- Operation Mitra (1951)
- Napoleon (1951) – Murat
- The Lovers of Ravello (1951) – Matteo
- The Dream of Zorro (1952) – Don Esteban Contrero
- Anita Garibaldi (1952) – Ciceruacchio
- Red Shirts (1952) – Count Stettin
- Don Lorenzo (1952)
- The Enemy (1952) – Il Monsignore
- Una Croce senza nome (1952) – Prof. Teofilo
- Non ho paura di vivere (1952)
- The Phantom Musketeer (1952) – doge Donato
- La prigioniera della torre di fuoco (1952) – Giovanni Storza
- Sins of Rome (1953) – Marcus Licinius Crassus
- The Most Wanted Man (1953) – Nick le Flicard
- Passione (1953)
- Cavallina storna (1953) – Il capitano Baroni
- Mid-Century Loves (1954) – Count Massimo Micheli (segment "L'amore romantico")
- 100 Years of Love (1954) – The Sergeant of Garibaldi's Army (segment "Garibaldina")
- Before the Deluge (1954) – Le président du tribunal
- The Doctor of the Mad (1954) – L'attore
- Naples Is Always Naples (1954) – Andrea Cafiero
- Queen of Babylon (1954) – Sibari
- Rosso e nero (1954)
- La grande avventura (1954) – governatore di Milano
- Chéri-Bibi (1955) – Le Commandant
- The Two Friends (1955) – Pietro Carletti
- Red and Black (1955)
- I giorni più belli (1956) – Uno degli ex alunni
- I miliardari (1956) – Raimondo Ferri
- Ciao, pais... (1956) – Colonello Agosti
- Engaged to Death (1957) – Parisi
- I colpevoli (1957) – Valerio Rossello
- Io, Caterina (1957)
- Il marito (1958) – Il Monsignore
- Two Women (1960) – Filippo, il padre di Michele
- Constantine and the Cross (1961) – Constantius Chlorus
- Musketeers of the Sea (1962) – Conte di Lorna
- Tiger of the Seven Seas (1962) – Tiger
