= Macario Against Zagomar =

- First theatrical release poster
- Directed by: Giorgio Ferroni
- Written by: Gian Paolo Callegari; Vittorio Metz; Giorgio Ferroni
- Produced by: Mario Borghi
- Starring: Erminio Macario
- Cinematography: Sergio Pesce
- Edited by: Arturo Gemmiti
- Music by: Amedeo Escobar
- Distributed by: Scalera Film
- Release date: 25 March 1944
- Running time: 83 minutes
- Country: Italy
- Language: Italian

Macario Against Zagomar (Italian: Macario contro Zagomar; also known as Macario Against Fantomas) is a 1944 Italian comedy film directed by Giorgio Ferroni and starring Erminio Macario.

== Plot ==
In Paris, the dreaded Zagomar kidnapped the daughter of a scientist to force him to deliver his latest discovery: a machine that "blocks" over time. Macario, the assistant teacher, decides to confront this elusive bandit that lurks in the bowels of the city.

== Cast ==
- Erminio Macario as Macario Duplessis
- Nino Crisman as Zagomar
- Gero Zambuto as Professor Moreau
- Nada Fiorelli as Mirella Moreau
- Olga Villi as Annette
- Carlo Rizzo as journalist Fandors

== Production ==
The film was made during World War II and should have been entitled "'Macario Against Fantomas'" but producers never acquired the rights to do so. To resolve the issue Vittorio Metz created the character of "Zagomar" a master villain modeled on "Fantômas".
