= Territorial Militia =

1935 film directed by Mario Bonnard

- Spanish poster
- Directed by: Mario Bonnard
- Written by: Aldo De Benedetti (novel); Luigi Bonelli; Nunzio Malasomma
- Produced by: Giuseppe Amato
- Starring: Antonio Gandusio; Rosina Anselmi; Leda Gloria
- Cinematography: Ferdinando Martini
- Edited by: Eraldo Da Roma
- Music by: Giulio Bonnard
- Production company: Gai Film
- Distributed by: EIA
- Release date: 1935
- Running time: 75 minutes
- Country: Italy
- Language: Italian

Territorial Militia (Italian: Milizia territoriale) is a 1935 Italian comedy film directed by Mario Bonnard and starring Antonio Gandusio, Rosina Anselmi and Leda Gloria. The film's sets were designed by the art director Virgilio Marchi.

== Synopsis ==
A mild-mannered man, overpowered at home and the shoe factory where he is employed, is called up to military service during the First World War with the rank of Major. He enjoys the daring and comradeship of fighting, but at the end of the war returns home to resume his former downtrodden life. However, one day he snaps and begins to assert himself once more.

== Cast ==
- Antonio Gandusio as Cav. Francesco Orlandi
- Rosina Anselmi as Erminia - sua sorella
- Leda Gloria as Martina
- Maurizio D'Ancora as Guido Reani
- Luigi Almirante as Salvatore Reani
- Enrico Viarisio as Gasparri
- Guido De Rege as Trimella
- Gemma Bolognesi as Antonietta
- Piero Pastore as Il soldato Grotta
- Enzo Gainotti
- Loris Gizzi
- Mimo Billi

== Bibliography ==
- Roberto Chiti & Roberto Poppi. I film: Tutti i film italiani dal 1930 al 1944. Gremese Editore, 2005.
