= Non me lo dire! =

1940 film

- Italian theatrical release poster
- Directed by: Mario Mattoli
- Written by: Vittorio Metz; Steno; Marcello Marchesi; Mario Mattoli
- Produced by: Liborio Capitani
- Starring: Erminio Macario
- Cinematography: Aldo Tonti
- Edited by: Mario Serandrei
- Music by: Cesare Andrea Bixio
- Release date: 15 December 1940
- Running time: 75 minutes
- Country: Italy
- Language: Italian

Non me lo dire! is a 1940 Italian "white-telephones" comedy film directed by Mario Mattoli and starring Erminio Macario.

== Plot ==
Italy, early 1940s. A rich nobleman, returning from America, has the unpleasant surprise of becoming dirt poor. His magnificent castle is impounded, and he agrees to become its tourist guide.

== Cast ==
- Erminio Macario - Michele Colombelli, marchese di Castel Perrone (as Macario)
- Vanda Osiris - Priscilla (as Vanda Osiri)
- Silvana Jachino - Luisella
- Enzo Biliotti - Il maggiordomo Battista
- Tino Scotti - Il matto
- Guglielmo Barnabò - L'organizzatore dei giochi di società
- Nino Pavese - Joe, L'autista
- Luigi Erminio D'Olivo - Il capo cameriere (as Erminio D'Olivo)
- Cesare Fantoni - Il proprietario del negozio
- Vinicio Sofia - Un cliente del negozio
- Guglielmo Sinaz - Il primo falso creditore
