= City Under Siege (1974 film) =

- Directed by: Romolo Guerrieri
- Screenplay by: Mino Roli; Nico Ducci
- Based on: Il commissario di Torino by Riccardo Marcato and Ugo Novelli
- Produced by: Luigi Rovere
- Starring: Enrico Maria Salerno
- Cinematography: Aldo Giordani
- Edited by: Antonio Siciliano
- Music by: Carlo Rustichelli
- Production company: Goriz Film
- Distributed by: Cineriz
- Release date: 25 October 1974 (Italy)
- Running time: 115 minutes
- Country: Italy
- Box office: ₤1.310 billion

City Under Siege (Italian: Un uomo, una città) is a 1974 Italian poliziottesco film directed by Romolo Guerrieri. The film is loosely based on Il commissario di Torino by Riccardo Marcato and Ugo Novelli.

== Plot ==
Michele Parrino is a grouchy, solitary, sickly but legitimate police commissioner in Turin. Parrino, helped by boozer journalist of La Stampa Paolo Ferrero and supported by his wealthy girlfriend Cristina, shall investigate about a murder of a young woman, daughter of a rich man.

Also if his city appear like an historical and industrial center, with a lot of rich family, Parrino's investigations discover another reality: a deceiver city, when the most rich capitalists live in luxury surrounded by vices, and the common people live of illusions. At the end, Parrino succeed to foil a prostitution and narcotics ring, but in the attempt of arrest the bosses (well-known aristocrats and industrialists), Parrino is transferred to the Guardia di Finanza and the Ferrero's article is blocked by his director.

For revenge, Parrino and Ferrero go to Teatro Regio as guests, but with the only goal of taunt the crime lords giving to them compromising sexual photos. Finally, Parrino and Ferrero distance themselves from the theatre to a dark night.

== Cast ==
- Enrico Maria Salerno: Michele Parrino
- Françoise Fabian: Cristina Cournier
- Luciano Salce: Paolo Ferrero
- Bruno Zanin: Maria's young lover
- Paola Quattrini: Anna
- Monica Monet: Luisa Grami
- Francesco Ferracini: Balistrieri
- Tino Scotti: Cavalier Battista
- Gipo Farassino: Polito
- Raffaele Curi: Franco
- Antonino Faà di Bruno : Colonel Peretti
- Maria D'Incoronato : Maria
- Anna Campori : Maria's lover's mother
- Attilio Dottesio : Coroner

== Production ==
City Under Siege was filmed at Icet-De Paolis in Milan and on location in Turin. Producer Luigi Rovere gave the director who guaranteed the director the luxury of shooting the film in eleven weeks.

== Release ==
City Under Siege was distributed theatrically by Cineriz in Italy on 25 October 1974. The film grossed a total of 1,309,698,000 Italian lire domestically.

== See also ==
- List of Italian films of 1974
