= L'eroe della strada =

- Directed by: Carlo Borghesio
- Written by: Carlo Borghesio; Leo Benvenuti; Mario Amendola; Mario Monicelli; Steno
- Produced by: Luigi Rovere
- Starring: Erminio Macario
- Cinematography: Renato del Frate
- Music by: Nino Rota
- Release date: 1948
- Running time: 86 minutes
- Country: Italy
- Language: Italian

L'eroe della strada (i.e. "The hero of the road") is a 1948 Italian comedy film directed by Carlo Borghesio and starring Erminio Macario.

== Plot ==
Felice Manetti, a poor, unemployed man, is accused of stealing a barrel organ. Saved by the testimony of Gaetano, a con man who pretends to be a former partisan, then Felice falls in love with a cigarette girl whose husband went missing in war.

== Cast ==
- Erminio Macario as Felice Manetti
- Carlo Ninchi as Gaetano Salvatore
- Delia Scala (credited as Lia Della Scala) as Giulietta Marchi
- Folco Lulli as Head of the Workers
- Piero Lulli as Paolo
- Monica Egg as Paulette Jones
- Cesare Costarelli as Comm. Zanotti
- Carlo Rizzo as Political Agitator
- Arnoldo Foà as Prosecutor
