= Franco Balducci =

Italian actor (1922–2001)

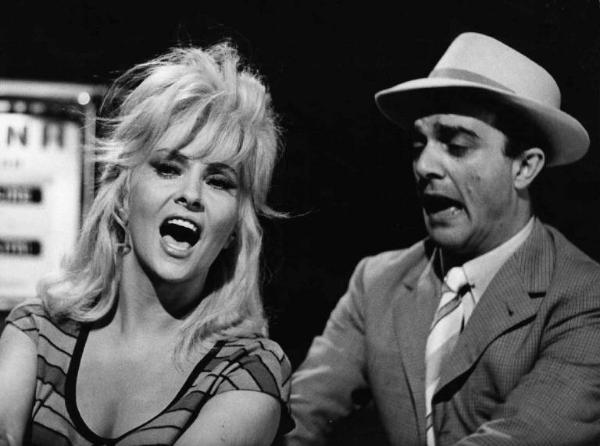
- Balducci (right) with Gina Lollobrigida in 1962
- Born: 23 November 1922; Bettona, Italy
- Died: 7 June 2001 (aged 78); Bettona, Italy
- Occupation: Actor
- Years active: 1947–1978

Franco Balducci (23 November 1922 – 7 June 2001) was an Italian film actor. He appeared in 75 films between 1947 and 1978. He was born in Umbria, Italy.

== Selected filmography ==
- Bullet for Stefano (1947) - Giacomo
- Tempesta su Parigi (1948)
- Les Misérables (1948) - (uncredited)
- Il monello della strada (1950) - Arizona Bill
- The Crossroads (1951)
- Lorenzaccio (1951)
- The Captain of Venice (1951)
- Stranger on the Prowl (1952) - Morelli
- Milady and the Musketeers (1952)
- Son of the Hunchback (1952)
- Le marchand de Venise (1953)
- Mystery of the Black Jungle (1954) - Kammamuri
- The Captain of Venice (1954) - Marin Soldero
- Black Devils of Kali (1954) - Kammamuri
- I cinque dell'Adamello (1954) - Renato
- Honey degli uomini perduti (1956)
- Ciao, pais... (1956) - Amleto
- Nights of Cabiria (1957) - Spectator on the Stage of the Cinema (uncredited)
- La grande ombra (1957) - Ranuccio
- Amarti è il mio destino (1957) - Piero
- L'amore più bello (1958)
- Arrivederci Firenze (1958) - Luca
- Head of a Tyrant (1959) - Galaad
- You're on Your Own (1959)
- Bad Girls Don't Cry (1959) - Eliseo
- The Sheriff (1960) - Jimmy Jesse's Brother (uncredited)
- The Conqueror of the Orient (1960) - Nureddin - Nadir's Companion
- The Hunchback of Rome (1960) - Pallaccia
- Two Women (1960) - Il tedesco nel pagliaio
- The Lovemakers (1961) - Tognaccio
- Tiro al piccione (1961) - Garrani
- Duel of the Titans (1961) - Acilio
- Caccia all'uomo (1961)
- La bellezza di Ippolita (1962) - Beppo
- The Slave (1962) - Verus - ship's Commander
- Warriors Five (1962) - Conti
- I diavoli di Spartivento (1963)
- L'ultima carica (1964)
- Romeo and Juliet (1964) - Benvolio
- Pirates of Malaysia (1964) - Sambigliong
- Genoveffa di Brabante (1964) - Rambaldo
- Hercules and the Tyrants of Babylon (1964) - Mobsab / Behar - Tanit's Escort
- I Kill, You Kill (1965) - Alex (segment "Il Plenilunio")
- Doc, Hands of Steel (1965) - Sheriff
- Made in Italy (1965) - The Driver (segment "5 'La Famiglia', episode 3")
- The Tramplers (1965) - Pete Wiley
- The Upper Hand (1966)
- Perry Grant, agente di ferro (1966) - Martin
- Sex Quartet (1966) - 1st Motorist (segment "Fata Sabina") (uncredited)
- Wanted (1967) - Cuzack
- Il tempo degli avvoltoi (1967) - Francisco
- Death Rides a Horse (1967) - Sceriffo
- Lola Colt (1967) - (uncredited)
- Day of Anger (1967) - Slim
- Django, Prepare a Coffin (1968) - Sheriff
- A Long Ride from Hell (1968) - Mason
- A Minute to Pray, a Second to Die (1968) - Kraut henchman
- A Sky Full of Stars for a Roof (1968) - Brent
- One on Top of the Other (1969) - Officer Loveday
- Night of the Serpent (1969) - Luciano
- Rosolino Paternò, soldato... (1970)
- Metello (1970) - Chellini
- A Man Called Sledge (1970) - Un carcerato
- No desearás al vecino del quinto (1970) - Fred Corleone
- Brancaleone at the Crusades (1970)
- A Lizard in a Woman's Skin (1971) - McKenna
- La supertestimone (1971) - Un detenuto
- Cross Current (1971) - Sante Foschi
- I due pezzi da 90 (1971)
- Do Not Commit Adultery (1971)
- 1870 (1972, TV Movie) - Remo Bezzi
- The Sicilian Checkmate (1972) - Gaetano
- Don't Torture a Duckling (1972) - Mr. Spriano - Michele's Father
- The Grand Duel (1972) - Bull's Friend
- Giordano Bruno (1973)
- Last Days of Mussolini (1974) - Franco Colombo
- The Suspect (1975) - Party Functionary with red shirt
- Libera, My Love (1975) - The police Commissioner
- Manhunt in the City (1975) - Alberto Pirazzini
- Destruction Force (1977) - Nino
- Black Journal (1977)
- Closed Circuit (1978, TV Movie) - Aldo Capocci (final film role)
