= Carlo Rizzo (actor) =

Italian stage and film actor

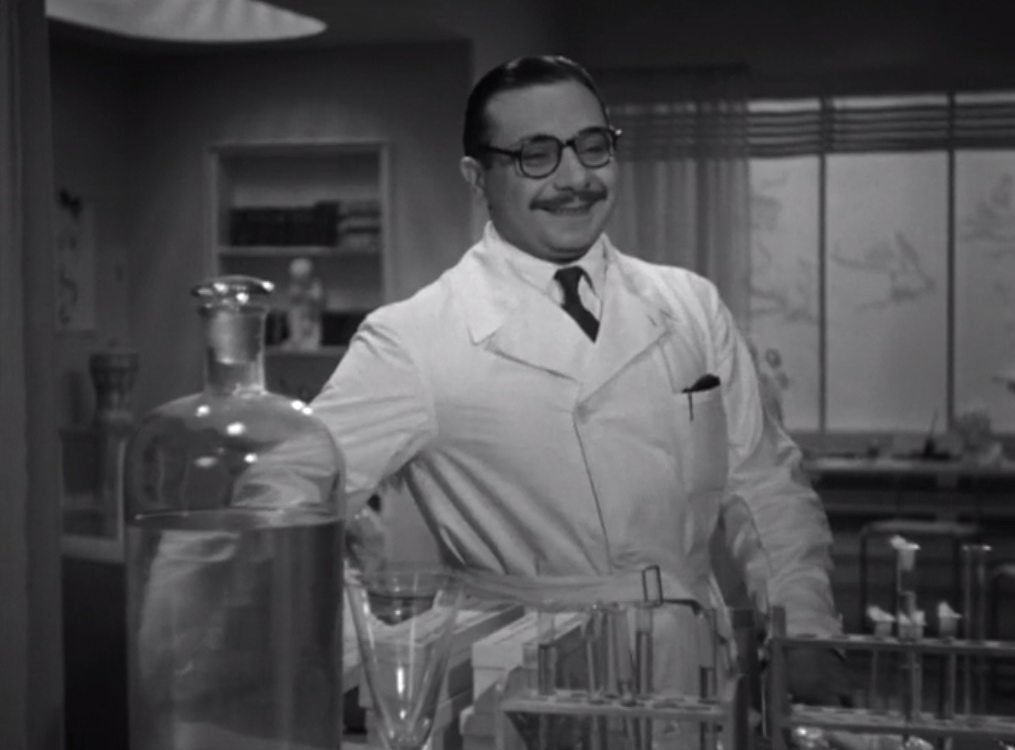
- Rizzo in Defendant, Stand Up! (1939)
- Born: 30 April 1907; Trieste, Austro-Hungarian Empire
- Died: 26 July 1979 (aged 72); Milan, Italy
- Occupation: Actor
- Years active: 1939–1979

Carlo Rizzo (30 April 1907 – 26 July 1979) was an Italian stage and film actor. He was the brother of the actor Alfredo Rizzo.

A regular in post-war Italian cinema he also featured in several American films produced in Italy.

== Selected filmography ==
- Defendant, Stand Up! (1939)
- Lo vedi come sei... lo vedi come sei? (1939)
- The Pirate's Dream (1940)
- Il fanciullo del West (1943)
- Charley's Aunt (1943)
- Macario Against Zagomar (1944)
- L'eroe della strada (1948)
- How I Discovered America (1949)
- That Ghost of My Husband (1950)
- Deported (1950)
- Il monello della strada (1951)
- When in Rome (1952)
- I, Hamlet (1952)
- The Passaguai Family Gets Rich (1952)
- My Wife, My Cow and Me (1952)
- If You Won a Hundred Million (1953)
- Roman Holiday (1953)
- The Rains of Ranchipur (1955)
- The Monte Carlo Story (1956)
- Seven Hills of Rome (1958)
- The Naked Maja (1958)
- It Started in Naples (1960)
- Swordsman of Siena (1962)
- Damon and Pythias (1962)
- Honeymoon, Italian Style (1966)
- The Biggest Bundle of Them All (1968)

== Bibliography ==
- Roberto Chiti & Roberto Poppi. Dizionario del cinema italiano: Dal 1945 al 1959. Gremese Editore, 1991.
