= Lo vedi come sei... lo vedi come sei? =

1939 film

- Directed by: Mario Mattoli
- Written by: Anacleto Francini; Mario Mattoli; Vittorio Metz; Steno
- Starring: Erminio Macario
- Cinematography: Ugo Lombardi
- Edited by: Fernando Tropea
- Release date: December 1939
- Running time: 75 minutes
- Country: Italy
- Language: Italian

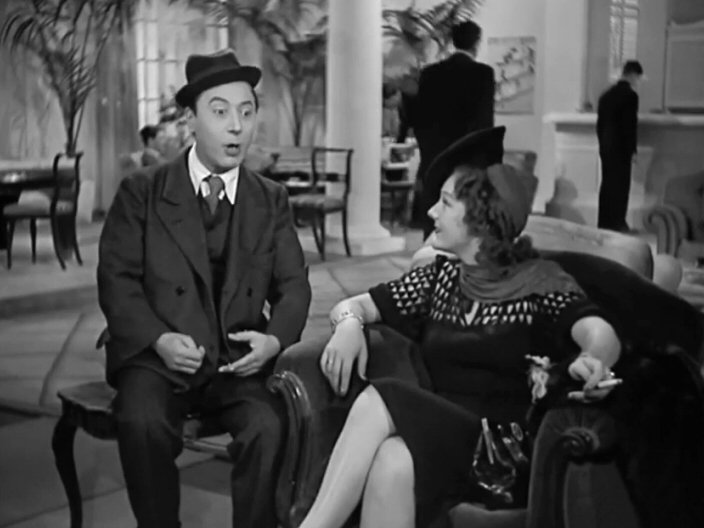

Lo vedi come sei... lo vedi come sei? is a 1939 Italian "white-telephones" comedy film directed by Mario Mattoli and starring Erminio Macario. The film's sets were designed by the art director Cinecittà Studios.

== Cast ==
- Erminio Macario - Michele Bernisconi (as Macario)
- Franca Gioieta - Rosetta
- Amleto Filippi - Tommaso Bernisconi
- Enzo Biliotti - Il notaio Cassetta
- Lina Tartara Minora - Adelaide (as Paola Minora)
- Carlo Rizzo - Il venditore di cravatte
- Vinicio Sofia - Il sindaco del paese
- Carlo Campanini - Il postino
- Greta Gonda - Emily
- Armando Migliari - L'imbonitore al lunapark
