= The Love Specialist =

1958 Italian-French film by Luigi Zampa

- Theatrical release poster
- Directed by: Luigi Zampa
- Written by: Michael Pertwee; Ennio De Concini; Liana Ferri; Luigi Zampa; Giovanna Soria; Franco Solinas; Giuseppe Gironda; Piero Pierotti; Luciano Martino
- Based on: novel by Raffaele Gianelli
- Produced by: Maleno Malenotti
- Starring: Diana Dors; Vittorio Gassman; Franca Valeri; Bruce Cabot
- Cinematography: Giuseppe Rotunno
- Edited by: Eraldo Da Roma
- Music by: Renzo Rossellini
- Production companies: Cité Films; G.E.S.I. Cinematografica; Olimpo
- Distributed by: Medallion Pictures Inc. (USA); GESI (Ialy)
- Release date: March 1958 (Italy)
- Running time: 102 minutes
- Countries: Italy; France
- Languages: Italian; English

The Love Specialist (also known as La Ragazza Del Palio and The Girl who Rode In the Palio) is 1958 Italian-French movie directed by Luigi Zampa and starring Diana Dors and Vittorio Gassman.

== Plot ==
Diana Dixon, a Texan girl, wins a quiz show jackpot, and uses her winnings (a prize in cash and a brand new Cadillac car) for a trip to Italy. Her car breaks down near Siena where she meets Prince Piero di Montalcino, a handsome Italian nobleman. He believes that she must be rich, and she also thinks that he must be wealthy, but that's very far from the truth.

The romance reaches its climax at the traditional Palio horse race where, after Diana breaks up with the prince upon hearing that he bribed the jockey of the rival contrada into throwing the race so that his horse could win, she fast-talks the rival horse's owner into letting her ride. After winning the Palio she marries the Prince.

== Cast ==
- Diana Dors as Diana Dixon
- Vittorio Gassman as Piero di Montalcino
- Franca Valeri as Contessa Bernardi
- Bruce Cabot as Mike
- Teresa Pellati as Laura
- Tina Lattanzi as Madre di Piero
- Enrico Viarisio as Il zio di Piero
- Nando Bruno as Papà ferrari
- Ronaldo Bonacchi as Tino

== Production ==
The film was based on the 1957 novel by Raffaelli Gianelli.

The casting of Dors and Gassman was announced in April 1957. Dors was one of a number of English and American stars making movies in Italy, including Mamie Van Doren and Steve Reeves. Dors arrived in Rome in July 1957.

Many of the extras for the horse race scenes were real jockeys, some of which quite known to the Sienese. One of them, Pietro De Angelis (nicknamed "Pietrino"), winner of two previous Palio races, died of a heart attack while the movie was being filmed in August.

The movie was also a springboard for the career of the sole woman jockey of the modern Palio horse race, Rosanna Bonelli, nicknamed "Diavola" but better known as "Rompicollo" ("breakneck") from the name of an operetta written by her father. She raced first in a mock Palio race staged for the shooting crew, in place of the jockey of the "Pantera" team (unbeknownst to the film production) and then as a stuntwoman for Ms. Dors in the victory scenes, riding the mare Gaudenzia. That helped the girl's rise to local fame and to crown her dream to run in the real Palio race of August 16, 1957 racing for the "Aquila" team, her first and last race on Siena's scenic Piazza del Campo, and although she didn't finish in first place like the film's heroine, she was bestowed the title of "honorary jockey" by the "contrada".

Filming was completed by October. Dors and Gassman were to be reunited in Strange Holiday.

== Reception ==
Variety called it "colorful, splendidly lensed."

The Monthly Film Bulletin called it "sheer pulp fiction".

Filmink called it "a gorgeous-looking movie, incidentally, in which Dors never appeared more beautiful on screen; there’s also a climax where she gets to win a horse race, the Palio di Siena – more of a triumphant finale than British cinema ever gave her. However, the film was little seen outside Europe."
