= Defendant, Stand Up! =

1939 film

- Italian theatrical release poster
- Directed by: Mario Mattoli
- Written by: Anacleto Francini; Vittorio Metz; Giovannino Guareschi; Marcello Marchesi; Stefano Vanzina; Mario Mattoli
- Produced by: Eugenio Fontana
- Starring: Erminio Macario; Ernesto Almirante; Greta Gonda
- Cinematography: Arturo Gallea
- Edited by: Fernando Tropea
- Music by: Vittorio Mascheroni; Luigi Spaggiari
- Production company: Alfa Cinematografica
- Distributed by: Consorzio Italiano Noleggiatori Filmi
- Release date: 13 October 1939
- Running time: 82 minutes
- Country: Italy
- Language: Italian

Defendant, Stand Up! (Italian: Imputato, alzatevi!) is a 1939 Italian comedy film directed by Mario Mattoli and starring Erminio Macario, Ernesto Almirante and Greta Gonda. It was shown as part of a retrospective on Italian comedy at the 67th Venice International Film Festival.

It was shot at the Cinecittà Studios in Rome. The film's sets were designed by the art director Piero Filippone.

== Plot ==
Italy, late 1930s. Cipriano, nurse and handyman in the pediatric clinic of a doctor his foster brother, is wrongly accused of having committed a murder. The process, however, proves his innocence, and Cipriano become so popular as to obtain a theatrical writing for a show that tells the true story of the murder. But the culprit is still there.

== Cast ==
- Erminio Macario as Cipriano Duval
- Leila Guarni as Giorgetta
- Ernesto Almirante as André Copersche, il presidente del tribunal
- Greta Gonda as La cantante afona
- Enzo Biliotti as L'avvocato Gaveneau
- Carlo Rizzo as Il medico
- Armando Migliari as Il ladro Vetriolo
- Lola Braccini as La portinaia
- Arturo Bragaglia as Il proprietario del tabarin 'Mariette'
- Felice Romano as Il commissario
- Lauro Gazzolo as L'uomo dagli schiaffi

== Bibliography ==
- Ernesto G. Laura. Comedy Italian Style. A.N.I.C.A., 1981.
