= Luigi Bonelli =

Italian playwright and screenwriter

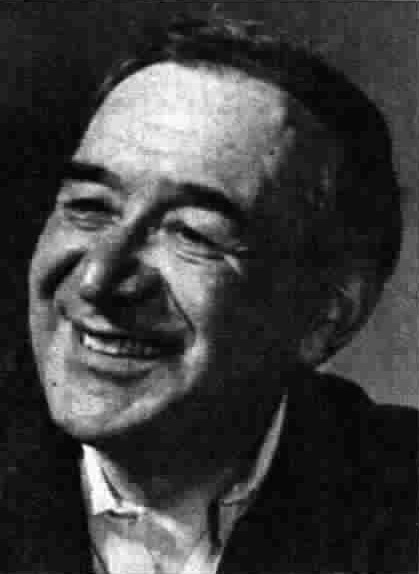
- Born: 18 July 1892; Siena, Tuscany, Italy
- Died: 13 February 1954 (aged 61); Siena, Tuscany, Italy
- Other name: Wassili Cetoff Stenberg
- Occupation: Writer
- Years active: 1909–1954 (film)

Luigi Bonelli (1892–1954) was an Italian playwright and screenwriter.

== Selected filmography ==
- Paradise (1932)
- Palio (1932)
- Nini Falpala (1933)
- Ginevra degli Almieri (1935)
- Territorial Militia (1935)
- The Man Who Smiles (1936)
- Lucrezia Borgia (1940)
- Boccaccio (1940)
- Rossini (1942)
- Souls in Turmoil (1942)
- The Adventures of Fra Diavolo (1942)
- The Iron Swordsman (1949)
- Captain Demonio (1950)
- The Captain of Venice (1951)
- Tragic Spell (1951)
- The Angels of the District (1952)
- Redemption (1952)
- The Angel of Sin (1952)

== Bibliography ==
- Goble, Alan. The Complete Index to Literary Sources in Film. Walter de Gruyter, 1999.
