= How I Lost the War =

1947 Italian comedy film

- Directed by: Carlo Borghesio
- Written by: Carlo Borghesio; Leo Benvenuti; Marcello Giannini; Mario Amendola; Aldo De Benedetti; Mario Monicelli; Steno; Tullio Pinelli
- Produced by: Luigi Rovere
- Starring: Erminio Macario
- Cinematography: Aldo Tonti
- Edited by: Rolando Benedetti
- Music by: Nino Rota
- Production company: Lux Film
- Distributed by: Lux Film
- Release date: 1947
- Language: Italian

How I Lost the War (Italian: Come persi la guerra) is a 1947 Italian comedy film directed by Carlo Borghesio and starring Erminio Macario.

== Plot ==
Italy, late 1940s. After being forced to wear military uniforms for most of his life, when the war ends, Leo replaces them with a firefighter's uniform.

== Cast ==
- Erminio Macario as Leo Bianchetti
- Vera Carmi as Gemma
- Nando Bruno as Checco Tremelloni
- Carlo Campanini as The German Captain
- Folco Lulli as American Official
- Fritz Marlat as Fritz
- Marco Tulli as German Official
- Piero Lulli as German Official
- Nunzio Filogamo as Hat Seller
- Gregorio Di Lauro as Soldier
- Veriano Ginesi as Soldier
