= Rolando Benedetti =

Italian film editor

- Occupation: Editor
- Years active: 1941–1954 (film)

Rolando Benedetti was an Italian film editor. He edited more than thirty films between 1941 and 1954 including Federico Fellini's The White Sheik and I Vitelloni.

== Selected filmography ==
- C'è sempre un ma! (1942)
- The Adventures of Fra Diavolo (1942)
- Don Cesare di Bazan (1942)
- I'll Sing No More (1945)
- The Nun of Monza (1947)
- How I Lost the War (1948)
- In the Name of the Law (1949)
- How I Discovered America (1949)
- Captain Demonio (1950)
- Mistress of the Mountains (1950)
- Path of Hope (1950)
- Il monello della strada (1950)
- Behind Closed Shutters (1951)
- Four Ways Out (1951)
- The Crossroads (1951)
- Lorenzaccio (1951)
- Napoleon (1951)
- The White Sheik (1952)
- The Angels of the District (1952)
- The Temptress (1952)
- Mademoiselle Gobete (1952)
- The Bandit of Tacca Del Lupo (1952)
- I Vitelloni (1953)
- Jealousy (1953)
- Puccini (1953)
- Fatal Desire (1953)
- Mid-Century Loves (1954)

== Bibliography ==
- Chris Wiegand. Federico Fellini: Ringmaster of Dreams, 1920-1993. Taschen, 2003.
