= The Crossroads (1951 film) =

1951 Italian crime film directed by Fernando Cerchio

- Italian theatrical release poster
- Directed by: Fernando Cerchio
- Written by: Leonardo Benvenuti; Aldo Bizzarri; Fernando Cerchio; Marcello Giannini; Giuseppe Mangione; Calogero Marrocco; Corrado Pavolini
- Produced by: Rosario Capaci; Luigi Rovere
- Starring: Raf Vallone; Charles Vanel; Claudine Dupuis
- Cinematography: Renato Del Frate
- Edited by: Rolando Benedetti
- Music by: Carlo Rustichelli
- Production companies: Epica Film; Rovere Film
- Distributed by: Regionale
- Release date: 19 March 1951
- Running time: 100 minutes
- Country: Italy
- Language: Italian

The Crossroads or The Junction (Italian: Il bivio) is a 1951 Italian crime film directed by Fernando Cerchio and starring Raf Vallone, Charles Vanel and Claudine Dupuis. A criminal infiltrates the police to assist his gang, but begins to have a change of heart when he enjoys his new job.

The film's sets were designed by Luigi Ricci.

== Plot ==
Italy, 1950s. Aldo Marchi (Raf Vallone), already decorated during the war and later became the leader of a dangerous criminal gang of thieves, managed to get into the police flying squad of Turin with the aim to safely direct the robbery of the companions

== Cast ==
- Raf Vallone as Aldo Marchi
- Charles Vanel as Lubiani
- Claudine Dupuis as Giovanna
- Saro Urzì as Il brigadiere Carmelo Carlin
- Carlo Sposito as Il vice-commissario Sani
- Gianni Rizzo as Beppe detto il Curato
- Natale Cirino as Aldrighi
- Franco Navarra as L'Americano
- Saro Arcidiacono as Bergomi
- Pierangelo Attino as Gino
- Franco Balducci
- Evar Maran as Mario Boresi detto il Bello
- Mimo Billi as Un vice-commissario
- Piero Pastore as De Vecchi
- Gianni Luda
- Enzo Tarascio
- Delfi Tanzi
- Winni Riva
- Ermanno Pavarino
- Alberto Collo
- Michel Lemoine

== Bibliography ==
- Roberto Curti. Italian Crime Filmography, 1968–1980. McFarland, 2013.
