= The Adventures of Fra Diavolo =

1942 film

- Directed by: Luigi Zampa
- Written by: Luigi Bonelli; Nicola Manzari; Giuseppe Romualdi; Luigi Zampa
- Produced by: Edoardo Brescia
- Starring: Enzo Fiermonte
- Cinematography: Giovanni Vitrotti
- Edited by: Rolando Benedetti
- Release date: March 1942
- Running time: 93 minutes
- Country: Italy
- Language: Italian

The Adventures of Fra Diavolo (Italian: Fra' Diavolo) is a 1942 Italian adventure film directed by Luigi Zampa and starring Enzo Fiermonte.

== Cast ==
- Enzo Fiermonte — Michele Pezza detto "Fra' Diavolo"
- Elsa De Giorgi — Fortunata Consiglio
- Laura Nucci — Gabriella Del Prà
- Cesare Bettarini — Carlo Consiglio
- Agostino Salvietti — Ciccio La Rosa, il capo della polizia
- Carlo Romano — Tiburzio
- Loris Gizzi — Il prefetto
- Marcello Giorda — Il generale
- Renato Chiantoni — Sputafuoco

== Plot ==
Michele Pezza is a brigand known as "Fra Diavolo" and fights with his "masses" in the mountains of Campania to drive the French out of the Kingdom of Naples. Having succeeded, thanks to his courage and skill in both military and espionage, the new Neapolitan government lavishes him with honors and appoints him colonel of the regular army. He marries Fortunata, a Neapolitan noblewoman whom he had known and loved from his days as a brigand, and by her, he has a son. In the long run, however, in that idle life among the comforts and riches, he feels nostalgia for the adventurous existence he had always led. When the French returned to the charge again, he refused to command the regular army. He reconstitutes his irregular bands, which have never disbanded and gives battle to the foreigners without quarter until overwhelmed by the enemy's numbers and weapons. He is captured and sentenced to death. Thanks to the intervention of Gabriella Del Prà, an influential lady sincerely in love with him though never reciprocated, his sentence is suspended on condition that he submit to the new French government. On the journey to Naples, Fra Diavolo manages to escape with Gabriella's complicity and hides in the mountains of Calabria, entering into legend.

== Production ==
The film was made in the Pisorno factories in Tirrenia.

== Distribution ==
The film was released in Italian theaters in March 1942.

== See also ==
- Donne e briganti (1950)
