= I giorni più belli =

1956 film

- Directed by: Mario Mattoli
- Written by: Fede Arnaud; Sandro Continenza; Ruggero Maccari; Ettore Scola
- Starring: Franco Interlenghi
- Cinematography: Mario Montuori
- Edited by: Roberto Cinquini
- Release date: 1956
- Running time: 100 minutes
- Country: Italy
- Language: Italian

I giorni più belli (transl. The Best Days or The Most Beautiful Days) is a 1956 Italian comedy film directed by Mario Mattoli and starring Franco Interlenghi.

== Cast ==
- Franco Interlenghi
- Vittorio De Sica
- Mario Carotenuto
- Valeria Moriconi
- Mario Riva
- Riccardo Billi
- Andrea Checchi
- Carlo Campanini
- Carlo Ninchi
- Nando Bruno
- Clelia Matania
