= The Pirate's Dream =

1940 film

- Italian theatrical release poster
- Directed by: Mario Mattoli
- Written by: Mario Mattoli; Vittorio Metz; Steno
- Produced by: Liborio Capitani
- Starring: Erminio Macario
- Cinematography: Aldo Tonti
- Edited by: Mario Serandrei
- Release date: 20 October 1940
- Running time: 75 minutes
- Country: Italy
- Language: Italian

The Pirate's Dream (Italian: Il pirata sono io!) is a 1940 Italian film directed by Mario Mattoli and starring Erminio Macario.

== Plot ==
The setting is Santa Cruz, in the second half of the eighteenth century. The Governor of the island, to ingratiate himself with the Viceroy, contrives to have the island assaulted from a mock pirate ship. The plan is to have a mock battle, defeat the aggressors and throw them back into the sea. The trouble is that the pirates really come...

== Cast ==
- Erminio Macario as José
- Juan de Landa as Bieco de la Muerte
- Enzo Biliotti as Il governatore
- Dora Bini as Olivia
- Mario Siletti as Il viceré
- Carmen Navasqués as La viceregina (as Carmen Navascues)
- Agnese Dubbini as La nutrice
- Katiuscia Odinzova as Lupita
- Carlo Rizzo as Pedro
- Tino Scotti as Il barbiere
