= Captain Demonio =

- Directed by: Carlo Borghesio
- Written by: Mario Amendola; Leonardo Benvenuti; Luigi Bonelli; Carlo Borghesio; Paola Ojetti
- Produced by: Giorgio Venturini
- Starring: Adriano Rimoldi; María Martín; Luisella Beghi
- Cinematography: Arturo Gallea
- Edited by: Rolando Benedetti
- Music by: Mario Nascimbene
- Production company: ICET
- Release date: 11 February 1950
- Running time: 90 minutes
- Country: Italy
- Language: Italian

Captain Demonio (Italian: Capitan Demonio) is a 1950 Italian historical adventure film directed by Carlo Borghesio and starring Adriano Rimoldi, María Martín and Luisella Beghi.

== Plot ==
In 1700 in Florence, the adventurer Capitan Demonio saves and then falls in love with him, a dancer from the snares of the Bargello.

== Cast ==
- Adriano Rimoldi as Capitan Demonio
- María Martín as Ballerina
- Luisella Beghi
- Otello Toso
- Nerio Bernardi as Il granduca
- Luigi Tosi as Il bargello
- Beniamino Maggio
- Jole Fierro
- Renato De Carmine
- Pietro Tordi
- Ria Teresa Legnani
- Carlo Ninchi
- Arrigo Peri
- Rodolfo Terlizzi
- Alberto Archetti
- Gianni Lova
- Luigi Benvenuti
- Nella Bartoli
- John Pasetti

== Bibliography ==
- Mariapia Command. Sulla carta: storia e storie della sceneggiatura in Italia. Lindau, 2006.
