= I, Hamlet =

1952 Italian film by Giorgio Simonelli

- Directed by: Giorgio Simonelli
- Written by: Erminio Macario; Mario Amendola; Ruggero Maccari; Edoardo Anton; Vincenzo Rovi; Dino Falconi; Ugo Guerra; Giovanni Grimaldi; Carlo Veo; Dino Verde; Renzo Puntoni
- Produced by: Erminio Macario
- Starring: Erminio Macario; Franca Marzi; Rossana Podestà
- Cinematography: Domenico Scala
- Edited by: Nino Baragli
- Music by: Ferruccio Martinelli
- Production company: Macario Film
- Distributed by: Safa Palatino
- Release date: 1952
- Running time: 103 minutes
- Country: Italy
- Language: Italian

I, Hamlet (Italian: Io, Amleto) is a 1952 Italian comedy film directed by Giorgio Simonelli and starring Erminio Macario, Franca Marzi and Rossana Podestà. A parody of William Shakespeare's tragedy Hamlet, its lack of commercial success led the newly formed production company Macario Film to a rapid bankruptcy.

The film's sets were designed by the art directors Arrigo Breschi and Saverio D'Eugenio. It was shot at the Safa Palatino Studios in Rome.

== Cast ==
- Erminio Macario as Hamlet
- Franca Marzi as Valchiria
- Rossana Podestà as Ophelia
- Adriano Rimoldi as Laertes
- Luigi Pavese as King Claudius
- Marisa Merlini as Queen Gertrude
- Giuseppe Porelli as Polonius
- Virgilio Riento as Anturius
- Carlo Rizzo as Horatio
- Silvio Noto as Rosadorno
- Sergio Bergonzelli as Fencing Master
- Guido Riccioli as Jorik il buffone
- Manlio Busoni as Ambasciatore d'Inghilterra
- Giancarla Vessio as Ausonia
- Giovanni Onorato as Guardia reale
