= Bullet for Stefano =

- Directed by: Duilio Coletti
- Screenplay by: Duilio Coletti; Federico Fellini; Tullio Pinelli
- Story by: Bruno Corra
- Produced by: Luigi Rovere; Dino De Laurentiis
- Starring: Rossano Brazzi; Valentina Cortese
- Cinematography: Carlo Montuori
- Edited by: Mario Serandrei
- Music by: Enzo Masetti
- Distributed by: Lux Film
- Release date: 22 October 1947
- Language: Italian

Bullet for Stefano (Italian: Il Passatore, also known as The Ferryman) is a 1947 Italian adventure-drama-crime film written and directed by Duilio Coletti and starring Rossano Brazzi and Valentina Cortese. It is loosely based on real-life events surrounding Stefano Pelloni (1824-1851), an Italian highwayman known as "Il Passatore". It grossed 146.2 million lire at the Italian box office.

== Cast ==
- Rossano Brazzi as Stefano Pelloni
- Valentina Cortese as Barbara Montanari
- Carlo Ninchi as Don Morini
- Camillo Pilotto as Count Gigiazzo Ghilardi
- Liliana Laine as Countess Isolina Ghilardi
- Carlo Campanini as Peppino
- Gualtiero Tumiati as Stefano's Father
- Bella Starace Sainati as Stefano's Mother
- Giovanni Grasso as Lazzarini
- Folco Lulli as The Monk
- Alberto Sordi as Innamorato
- Carlo Tamberlani as Maresciallo Borghi
- Pupella Maggio as Marta
- Franco Balducci as Giacomo
- Enrico Luzi as Poor Student
- Memmo Carotenuto as Thief
