= Nico Pepe =

Italian actor (1917–1987)

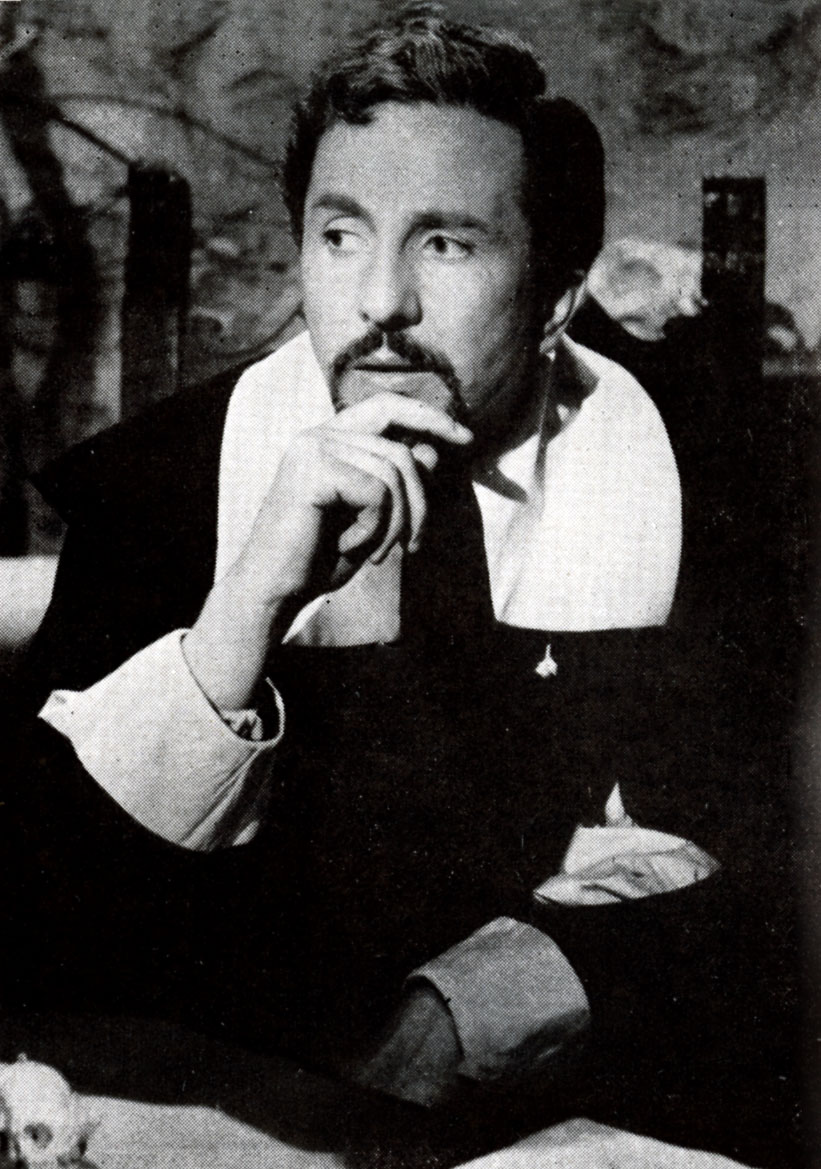
- Born: Domenico Pepe; 19 January 1917; Udine, Italy
- Died: 13 August 1987 (aged 70); Udine, Italy
- Occupation: Actor
- Years active: 1936–1981

Nico Pepe (19 January 1917 – 13 August 1987) was an Italian actor. He appeared in more than 80 films between 1936 and 1981.

== Life and career ==
Born in Udine, after a bachelor's degree in business Pepe got a job as a banking clerk, which he quit to perform in the theater company led by Roldano Lupi and Paola Borboni. He later entered some of the major companies of the time, working among others with Vittorio De Sica, Dina Galli, Ruggero Ruggeri and Sergio Tofano. In the second post-war, he served as artistic director of several theaters, including the Teatro Stabile di Torino. Starting from Giorgio Strehler's 1953 rendition of Luigi Pirandello's Six Characters in Search of an Author and until late 1970s he frequently worked at the Piccolo Teatro in Milan.

Also active in films, radio and television and as a dubber, he retired from acting in the early 1980s, and in his late years directed a theater school in the Friulian language. He was married to actress Clara Auteri.

== Selected filmography ==
- The Two Sergeants (1936)
- The Cavalier from Kruja (1940)
- Captain Fracasse (1940)
- Don Pasquale (1940)
- The Mask of Cesare Borgia (1941)
- A Husband for the Month of April (1941)
- Giarabub (1942)
- The Black Panther (1942)
- The Countess of Castiglione (1942)
- Men of the Mountain (1943)
- Mad About Opera (1948)
- Crossroads of Passion (1948)
- Be Seeing You, Father (1948)
- Night Taxi (1950)
- Feathers in the Wind (1950)
- Pact with the Devil (1950)
- The Beggar's Daughter (1950)
- Beauties on Bicycles (1951)
- Accidents to the Taxes!! (1951)
- Napoleon (1951)
- Son of the Hunchback (1952)
- The Angels of the District (1952)
- Frine, Courtesan of Orient (1953)
- Captain Phantom (1953)
- The Three Thieves (1954)
- The Count of Bragelonne (1954)
- Orphan of the Ghetto (1954)
- The Beach (1954)
- The Lovers of Manon Lescaut (1954)
- The Song of the Heart (1955)
- Sins of Casanova (1955)
- The Intruder (1956)
- The Angel of the Alps (1957)
- Checkerboard (1959)
- Gentlemen Are Born (1960)
- Minotaur, the Wild Beast of Crete (1960)
- Operation Gold Ingot (1962)
- The Homeless One (1981)
