= The Two Friends =

1955 film directed by Carlo Borghesio

- Directed by: Carlo Borghesio
- Written by: Mario Amendola; Aldo Fabrizi; Ruggero Maccari
- Starring: Aldo Fabrizi; Peppino De Filippo; Giulia Rubini
- Cinematography: Aldo Giordani
- Edited by: Luciano Benedetti
- Music by: Carlo Rustichelli
- Production companies: Imperial; Società Italiana Cines
- Release date: 1955
- Running time: 95 minutes
- Country: Italy
- Language: Italian

The Two Friends (Italian: I due compari) is a 1955 Italian comedy film directed by Carlo Borghesio and starring Aldo Fabrizi, Peppino De Filippo and Giulia Rubini.

The film's sets were designed by Flavio Mogherini.

== Cast ==
- Aldo Fabrizi as Giovanni Bellini
- Peppino De Filippo as Ciccillo
- Giulia Rubini as Giulietta Bellini
- Carlo Ninchi as Pietro Carletti
- Germana Paolieri as Signora Carletti
- Giacomo Furia as Vincenzo, il sarto
- Ilse Peterson as Figlia di Carletti
- Loris Gizzi as Un invitato
- Leonardo Botta as Enrico Carletti
- Vincenzo Talarico as Lorenzucci
- Mario Siletti
- Lidia Martora
- Rosita Pisano
- Lia Reiner
- Pietro Carloni
- Ugo Sasso

== Bibliography ==
- Adriano Pintaldi. Aldo Fabrizi: arte romana : al cinema e in cucina. Maggioli Editore, 2012.
