= Greta Gonda =

Austrian actress (1917–1974)

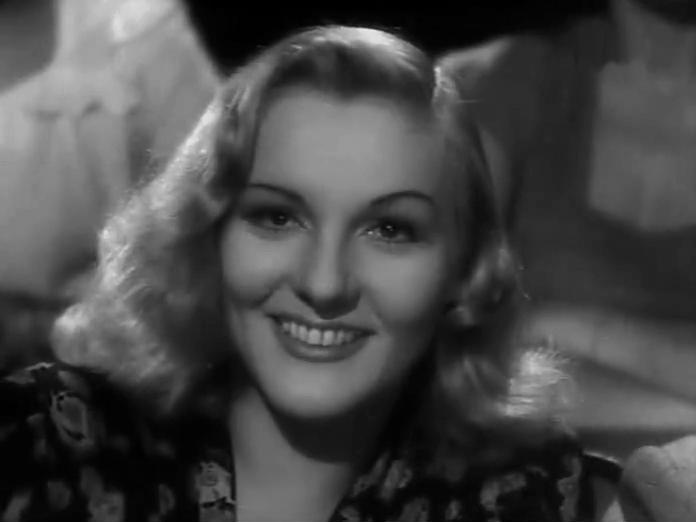
- Born: Margarethe Tomicek Mondschein; 10 June 1917; Vienna, Austro-Hungarian Empire
- Died: 11 December 1974 (aged 57); Rome, Italy
- Occupation: Actress
- Years active: 1939–1967 (film)

Greta Gonda (1917–1974) was an Austrian stage and film actress who emigrated to Italy where she worked as a leading lady. She was born in Margarethe Tomicek Mondschein in Vienna, but left for Italy in the mid-1930s. In later life Gonda also worked as a sculptor.

== Selected filmography ==
- Defendant, Stand Up! (1939)
- We Were Seven Widows (1939)
- Lo vedi come sei... lo vedi come sei? (1939)
- The Carnival of Venice (1939)
- Antonio Meucci (1940)
- Don Pasquale (1940)
- Pirates of Malaya (1941)
- Rossini (1942)
- The Queen of Navarre (1942)
- Harlem (1943)
- The Devil Goes to Boarding School (1944)
- Eleven Men and a Ball (1948)

== Bibliography ==
- Gundle, Stephen. Mussolini's Dream Factory: Film Stardom in Fascist Italy. Berghahn Books, 2013.
