= Charley's Aunt (1943 film) =

1943 film

- Directed by: Alfredo Guarini
- Written by: Brandon Thomas (play); Alfredo Guarini; Achille Campanile; Riccardo Cassano; Alberto Simeoni
- Starring: Erminio Macario; Carlo Minello; Maurizio D'Ancora
- Cinematography: Enzo Serafin
- Edited by: Riccardo Cassano
- Music by: Albert W. Ketèlbey; Mario Pagano
- Production companies: Produzione Capitani Film; Società Italiana Cines
- Distributed by: ENIC
- Release date: 2 January 1943
- Running time: 66 minutes
- Country: Italy
- Language: Italian

Charley's Aunt (Italian: La zia di Carlo) is a 1943 Italian comedy film directed by Alfredo Guarini and starring Erminio Macario, Carlo Minello and Maurizio D'Ancora.

It is based on the 1892 play Charley's Aunt by Brandon Thomas. The film was shot at Fert Studios in Turin.

== Cast ==
- Erminio Macario as Terenzio
- Carlo Minello as Carlo
- Maurizio D'Ancora as Guidobaldo
- Lucy D'Albert as Lucia Tuberosa
- Silvana Jachino as Rina
- Lori Randi as Dora
- Virgilio Riento as Casimiro, it tutore
- Guglielmo Barnabò as Il colonnello
- Carlo Rizzo as Il maggiordomo
- Lia Corelli as La figlia del giardiniere
- Linda Pini as L'autentica zia
- Giulio Alfieri
- Irina Ingris
- Carlo Moreno

== Bibliography ==
- Roberto Chiti & Enrico Lancia. Dizionario del cinema italiano: I film. Gremese Editore, 2005.
