= The Song of Life (1945 film) =

1945 film directed by Carmine Gallone

- Directed by: Carmine Gallone
- Written by: Gherardo Gherardi; Carmine Gallone
- Starring: Alida Valli; Carlo Ninchi; María Mercader
- Cinematography: Ubaldo Arata
- Edited by: Niccolò Lazzari
- Music by: Ettore Montanaro
- Production company: Excelsa Film
- Distributed by: Minerva Film
- Release date: 15 December 1945
- Running time: 80 minutes
- Country: Italy
- Language: Italian

The Song of Life (Italian: Il canto della vita) is a 1945 Italian melodrama film directed by Carmine Gallone and starring Alida Valli, Carlo Ninchi and María Mercader. It is set during the German occupation of Rome in the Second World War before the Liberation of the city in 1944. It was shot at the Scalera Studios in Rome. The film's sets were designed by the art director Gastone Medin.

== Cast ==
- Alida Valli as Giovanna
- Carlo Ninchi as Padron Cesare
- María Mercader as Maria
- Roberto Bruni as Giacomo, figlio di Cesare
- Luigi Almirante as Il vecchio Po
- Mario Pisu as Rimondino
- Roberto Donati as Il piccolo Cesare
- Dina Romano as La vecchia zia di

== Bibliography ==
- Sara Pesce. Memoria e immaginario: la Seconda Guerra mondiale nel cinema italiano. Le mani, 2008.
