= Ernesto Almirante =

Italian actor (1877–1964)

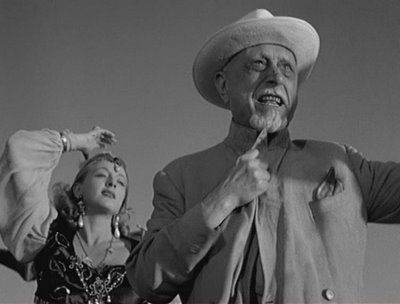
- Almirante in the movie The White Sheik (1952)
- Born: 24 September 1877; Mistretta, Kingdom of Italy
- Died: 13 December 1964 (aged 87); Bologna, Italy
- Occupation: Actor
- Height: 1.63 m (5 ft 4 in)

Ernesto Almirante (24 September 1877 – 13 December 1964) was an Italian film and stage actor.

== Life and career ==
Born in Mistretta into a family of actors, Almirante worked several years on stage along his father Nunzio. He was also active as agent and organizer of several stage companies.

After an occasional film role in the 1919 mute film Federica d'Illirio, starting from mid-1930s Almirante became one of the most active character actors of his time. In 1955, he retired from acting and moved into a retirement home for actors in Bologna. He was the uncle of politician Giorgio Almirante.

== Partial filmography ==
- Federica d'Illiria (1919)
- Red Passport (1935) - L'addetto di passaporto clandestini
- At Your Orders, Madame (1939) - Lorot, l'impiegato del notaio
- We Were Seven Widows (1939) - L'anziano capitano della nave
- Defendant, Stand Up! (1939) - André Copersche, il presidente del tribunal
- La mia canzone al vento (1939)
- The Document (1939)
- The Night of Tricks (1939) - Francesco Acquaviva
- One Hundred Thousand Dollars (1940) - Michele Zilay
- La granduchessa si diverte (1940)
- A Romantic Adventure (1940) - Berni, il socio di Luigi
- Piccolo alpino (1940) - Il professore
- The Daughter of the Green Pirate (1940) - Il precettore delle educante
- Manovre d'amore (1940) - Enchelly
- Marco Visconti (1941) - Tremacoldo
- Thrill (1941) - Isidoro Janosky
- The Adventuress from the Floor Above (1941) - Il padre de Biancamaria
- Honeymoon (1941) - Ernesto Gelardi
- Alone at Last (1942) - Il professore Ippolito Mariani
- Margherita fra i tre (1942) - Giovanni
- Wedding Day (1942) - La zio dello sposo
- Mater dolorosa (1943) - Il nobiluoimo anziano al concerto
- Il nostro prossimo (1943)
- In cerca di felicità (1944) - Brocca
- O sole mio (1946)
- The Testimony (1946) - Giuseppe Marchi
- L'angelo e il diavolo (1946)
- Tempesta d'anime (1946)
- To Live in Peace (1947) - Il Nonno
- L'onorevole Angelina (1947) - Luigi
- The Captain's Daughter (1947) - Savelich
- The Brothers Karamazov (1947) - Maximoff
- Difficult Years (1948) - Il nonno
- Eleven Men and a Ball (1948) - Il professore
- Ti ritroverò (1949) - The Old Fisherman
- The Firemen of Viggiù (1949) - Uno spettatore
- Alarm Bells (1949) - Il possidente
- The Bride Can't Wait (1949)
- I'm in the Revue (1950) - Le colonel
- Father's Dilemma (1950) - L'invitato anziano
- The White Line (1950) - The Grandfather
- That Ghost of My Husband (1950)
- Cops and Robbers (1951) - Esposito's Father
- Ergastolo (1952) - Prof. Arlotta
- The White Sheik (1952) - Dottore Fortuna - il regista del fotoromanzo
- Toto and the King of Rome (1952) - Nedo
- Matrimonial Agency (1953) - Zio di Lodolini
- 100 Years of Love (1954) - Antonio Bianchi (segment "Nozze d'Oro")
- Via Padova 46 (1954) - Cesare
- Ore 10: lezione di canto (1955) - Il Prof. Tapparelli
- Destination Piovarolo (1955) - Ernesto
- Il coraggio (1955) - Salvatore Esposito (final film role)
