= Carlo Borghesio =

Italian film director and screenwriter

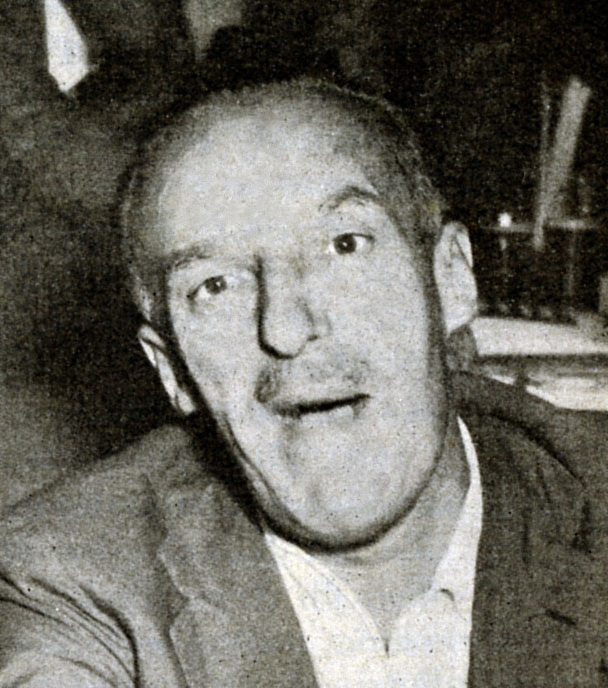
- Born: 24 June 1905; Turin, Italy
- Died: 12 November 1983 (aged 78); Turin, Italy
- Occupation(s): Director, Writer
- Years active: 1938-1955 (film)

Carlo Borghesio (24 June 1905 – 12 November 1983) was an Italian film director and screenwriter.

== Life and career ==
Born in Turin, Borghesio started his career as an assistant director in the second half of the 1930s, notably collaborating with Alessandro Blasetti and Mario Mattoli. After collaborating to a number of screenplays, he made his directorial debut in 1939, co-directing with Mario Soldati the comedy film Due milioni per un sorriso. Borghesio is best known for his association with Erminio Macario, he directed in a number of critically acclaimed comedies between the 1940s and the early 1950s.

== Selected filmography ==
- Two Million for a Smile (1939)
- The Sin of Rogelia Sanchez (1940)
- The Champion (1943)
- Two Hearts (1943)
- How I Lost the War (1947)
- L'eroe della strada (1948)
- How I Discovered America (1949)
- Captain Demonio (1950)
- Napoleon (1951)
- Il monello della strada (1951)
- The Angels of the District (1952)
- The Steel Rope (1953)
- The Two Friends (1955)
