= The Angels of the District =

1952 film

- French film poster
- Directed by: Carlo Borghesio
- Written by: Mario Amendola; Luigi Bonelli; Carlo Borghesio; Sandro Continenza; Ennio De Concini
- Starring: Rossana Podestà; Jacques Sernas; Marisa Merlini
- Cinematography: Vincenzo Seratrice
- Edited by: Rolando Benedetti
- Music by: Nino Rota
- Production company: Epoca Film
- Release date: 16 October 1952
- Running time: 81 minutes
- Country: Italy
- Language: Italian

The Angels of the District (Italian: Gli Angeli del quartiere) is a 1952 Italian drama film directed by Carlo Borghesio and starring Rossana Podestà, Jacques Sernas and Marisa Merlini. The film's sets were designed by the art director Luigi Ricci while the score was composed by Nino Rota.

== Plot ==
Italy in the early 1950s. Five children whose parents died in World War II live in the dilapidated basement of an old apartment building. One night, Virgola, the youngest of them, discovers several boxes in an adjoining room, all of which are filled with 1,000 lira bills. The boys, who have suddenly become infinitely rich, decide not to tell any adults their secret, but soon have to realize that they cannot do without an adult to manage the money and shop for them. So they take Mario, a pickpocket, into their midst. Although Mario originally only wanted the boys' money and wanted to steal from them, the children's genuine affection and trust transforms him into a better person. He is now making every effort to break away from his shady and criminal cronies in order to start a new life. Then he and the children become secret benefactors. They help and give gifts to the poor, the elderly, and above all to the children of the city. Eventually, they leave all the money to the nuns at a hospital. After Mario was able to free himself from his past, he marries an acquaintance of the children. Everyone is happy and content now.

== Cast ==
- Enzo Cerusico as Il Capo
- Giancarlo Nicotra as Virgola
- Giampiero Sciommari as Sonno
- Nicola Gallo as Ta-Tà
- Ciccio Jacono as Carnera
- Jacques Sernas as Mario
- Rossana Podestà as Lisa
- Marisa Merlini as Gianna
- Nico Pepe as Giuseppe
- Virgilio Riento as Cecco

== Bibliography ==
- Borin, Fabrizio. La filmografia di Nino Rota. L.O. Olschki, 1999.
