= Toto's First Night =

- Directed by: Mario Amendola
- Written by: Franco Castellano; Bruno Corbucci; Giovanni Grimaldi; Giuseppe Moccia
- Produced by: Mario Mariani
- Starring: Totò; Erminio Macario
- Cinematography: Bitto Albertini
- Edited by: Jolanda Benvenuti
- Music by: Armando Trovajoli
- Production companies: Cinex; Incei Film
- Distributed by: Incei Film
- Release date: 1962
- Running time: 100 minutes
- Country: Italy
- Language: Italian

Toto's First Night (Italian: Totò di notte n. 1) is a 1962 Italian musical comedy film directed by Mario Amendola and starring Totò and Erminio Macario.

== Plot ==
Ninì and Mimi are two friends, itinerant players, who can not make a penny. It is performed at night, in various places, arousing only the laughter of the public, until Mimi is delivered the conspicuous legacy of his uncle. Ninì immediately takes the opportunity to re-launch the duo in nightclubs, but squanders all the money in goliardic parties.

== Cast ==
- Totò as Nini
- Erminio Macario as Mimi Makò
- Margaret Lee
- Helmut Zacharias
- Mac Ronay
- Dodo' D'Amburg
- Pascaline
- Caroline Lecerf
- Moa Tahi
- Karin Koidl
- Margaret Rose Keil
- Caroline Cherie
- Madame Arthur
- Dori Dorika
- Don Lurio

== Bibliography ==
- Ennio Bìspuri. Totò: principe clown : tutti i film di Totò. Guida Editori, 1997.
