= Behind Closed Shutters =

1951 film

- Directed by: Luigi Comencini
- Written by: Massimo Mida; Gianni Puccini; Franco Solinas; Sergio Sollima
- Produced by: Luigi Rovere
- Starring: Massimo Girotti; Eleonora Rossi Drago; Giulietta Masina
- Cinematography: Arturo Gallea
- Edited by: Rolando Benedetti
- Music by: Carlo Rustichelli
- Production company: Rovere Film
- Distributed by: Lux Film
- Release date: 12 March 1951
- Running time: 90 minutes
- Country: Italy
- Language: Italian

Behind Closed Shutters (Italian: Persiane chiuse) is a 1951 Italian crime-melodrama directed by Luigi Comencini and starring Massimo Girotti, Eleonora Rossi Drago, and Giulietta Masina. The film follows Sandra (Drago) as she searches for her missing sister, venturing into the seedy underworld of Genoa.

== Plot ==
In Turin, Sandra, the daughter of a caretaker, is engaged to Roberto, an employee at a construction company. Her sister Lucia has been estranged from the family after a relationship considered inappropriate. When a friend of Lucia's is killed and her body found in the Po River, Lucia, distressed, attempts suicide and calls Sandra for help.

Sandra turns to Edmondo, a man connected to prostitution circles, to locate her sister. Although he recognizes Lucia in a photograph, he does not disclose it. Lucia is in fact under the control of Primavera, a pimp. Edmondo hinders Sandra's efforts, and she is briefly arrested in a police raid after being taken to a nightclub. Following her release, Sandra makes contact with the group, who demand money in exchange for Lucia's release.

The film concludes with Lucia being freed after a confrontation in the port of Genoa.

== Cast ==
- Massimo Girotti as Roberto
- Eleonora Rossi Drago as Sandra
- Giulietta Masina as Pippo
- Liliana Gerace as Lucia
- Renato Baldini as Primavera
- Ottavio Senoret as Signorino
- Cesarina Gheraldi as Gianna
- Antonio Nicotra as Barale
- Renato Baldini as Primavera
- Sidney Gordon as Il commissario
- Goliarda Sapienza as La prostituta religiosa

== Bibliography ==
- Luca Barattoni. Italian Post-Neorealist Cinema. Edinburgh University Press, 2013.
