= Rome, Free City =

1946 film directed by Marcello Pagliero

- Directed by: Marcello Pagliero
- Written by: Ennio Flaiano; Suso Cecchi D'Amico; Cesare Zavattini; Pino Mercanti; Marcello Pagliero
- Produced by: Marcello d'Amico
- Starring: Valentina Cortese; Andrea Checchi; Marisa Merlini; Vittorio De Sica
- Cinematography: Aldo Tonti
- Edited by: Giuliana Attenni
- Music by: Nino Rota
- Production company: Pao Film
- Distributed by: Fincine
- Release date: 17 December 1946
- Running time: 81 minutes
- Country: Italy
- Language: Italian

Rome, Free City (Italian: Roma città libera) is a 1946 Italian drama film directed by Marcello Pagliero and starring Valentina Cortese, Andrea Checchi, Marisa Merlini and Vittorio De Sica. The film's sets were designed by the art director Gastone Medin.

== Cast ==
- Valentina Cortese as La ragazza
- Andrea Checchi as Il giovane
- Nando Bruno as Il ladro
- Marisa Merlini as Mara
- Gar Moore as L'americano
- Vittorio De Sica as Il signore distanto
- Manlio Busoni as Il falsario
- Fedele Gentile as Il ricettatore
- Francesco Grandjacquet as Il padrone della bisca
- Ave Ninchi as L'affittacamere
- Ennio Flaiano as Il questurino

== Bibliography ==
- Chiti, Roberto & Poppi, Roberto. Dizionario del cinema italiano: Dal 1945 al 1959. Gremese Editore, 1991.
- Gundle, Stephen. Fame Amid the Ruins: Italian Film Stardom in the Age of Neorealism. Berghahn Books, 2019.
- Moliterno, Gino. The A to Z of Italian Cinema. Scarecrow Press, 2009.
