= Erminio Macario =

Italian actor

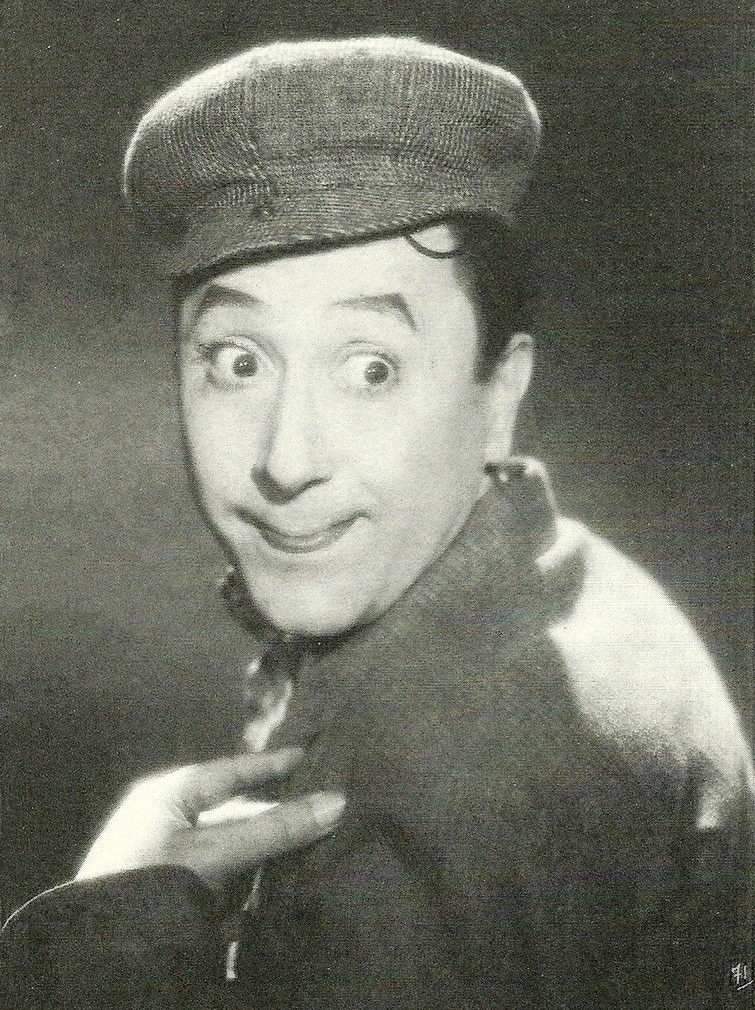
- Macario in the movie Il chiromante
- Born: 27 May 1902; Turin, Kingdom of Italy
- Died: 25 March 1980 (aged 77); Turin, Italy
- Occupation: Actor
- Years active: 1933–1975
- Spouses: Maria Giuliano; Giulia Dardanelli (m. 1938; died 1980)
- Children: Alberto (1943); Mauro (1947)

Erminio Macario (27 May 1902 – 25 March 1980), best known as Macario, was an Italian film actor and comedian. He appeared in 42 films between 1933 and 1975.

== Life and career ==
Born in Turin, Macario made his debut at a young age in the amateur dramatics company Don Bosco Oratory in Valdocco, then he was part of some small amateur companies in his hometown until 1924. At this time, he was cast in the company of dancing and pantomime of Giovanni Molasso. Soon after, he entered the company of Wanda Osiris, the undisputed queen of the revue of that time in Italy. Between the two wars he became, in a short time, one of the most popular comedians of the revue theatre.

Macario made his film debut in 1933 with Aria di paese, but the success came just six years later with two comedy films directed by Mario Mattoli and co-written by a young Federico Fellini, Imputato alzatevi! and Lo vedi come sei... lo vedi come sei?. After a series of successful comedies directed by Carlo Borghesio since the early fifties, Macario appeared in short characterizations in anthology films and was sidekick of Totò in a number of films. Starting from the mid-sixties he finally dedicated himself to television and theatre.

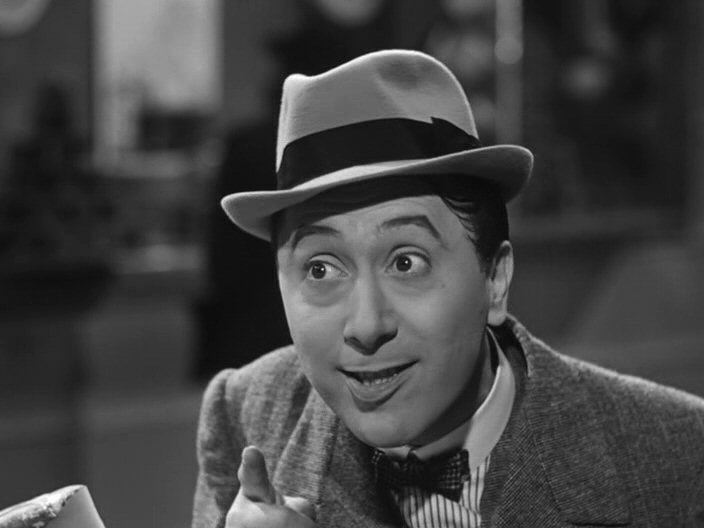
Macario in Defendant, Stand Up! (1939)

His comical style was referred to as a mixture between Chaplin's Charlot and Marx Brothers.

== Partial filmography ==
- Country Air (1933) - Mac
- Defendant, Stand Up! (1939) - Cipriano Duval
- Lo vedi come sei... lo vedi come sei? (1939) - Michele Bernisconi
- The Pirate's Dream (1940) - José
- Non me lo dire! (1940) - Michele Colombelli, marchese di Castel Perrone
- Il chiromante (1941) - Candido
- Il vagabondo (1941) - Pippo, il vagabondo
- Il fanciullo del West (1943) - Mac Carey
- Charley's Aunt (1943) - Terenzio
- Arcobaleno (1943)
- Macario Against Zagomar (1944) - Macario Duplessis
- The Innocent Casimiro (1945) - Casimiro Pelagatti
- L'eroe della strada (1948) - Felice Manetti
- How I Lost the War (1948) - Leo Bianchetti
- Adam and Eve (1949) - Adamo Rossi
- How I Discovered America (1949) - Cristoforo Colombo
- Il monello della strada (1950) - Carletto Po
- The Passaguai Family Gets Rich (1952) - Giocondo Diotallevi
- My Wife, My Cow and Me (1952) - Mario
- I, Hamlet (1952) - Amleto
- Matrimonial Agency (1953) - Peppino
- Carosello del varietà (1955)
- Italia piccola (1957) - Sandrin
- La cambiale (1959) - Tommaso
- Lo smemorato di Collegno (1962) - Nicola Politi
- Toto's First Night (1962) - Mimi Makò
- I 4 monaci (1962) - Fra' Martino
- Sexy Toto (1963) - Mimi Cocco
- Avventura al motel (1963) - Erminio
- Uno strano tipo (1963) - Giovanni
- Totò contro i quattro (1963) - La Matta
- The Monk of Monza (1963) - Fra' Mamozio
- I 4 tassisti (1963) - Pomilio Barone (segment "Caccia al tesoro")
- The Four Musketeers (1963)
- Lisa dagli occhi blu (1970) - Tramp with the cats
- Nel giorno del signore (1970) - Don Giacinto
- The Mighty Anselmo and His Squire (1972) - Frà Prosdocimo Zatterin da' San Donà di Piave
- Ante Up (1974)
- Due sul pianerottolo (1976) - Prof. Luigi Savoia
