= Puccini (film) =

1953 film directed by Carmine Gallone

- French film poster
- Directed by: Carmine Gallone
- Written by: Leonardo Benvenuti; Carmine Gallone; Glauco Pellegrini; Aldo Bizzarri
- Produced by: Antonio Muso; Luigi Rovere
- Cinematography: Claude Renoir
- Edited by: Rolando Benedetti
- Music by: Francesco Molinari Pradelli
- Distributed by: Rizzoli Film
- Release date: 29 April 1953
- Running time: 119 minutes
- Country: Italy
- Language: Italian

Puccini is a 1953 Italian biographical musical melodrama film directed by Carmine Gallone. It stars actor Gabriele Ferzetti in the role of Giacomo Puccini.

== Plot ==
The film narrates the composer's life full of loves and recklessness, starting from the youthful period in which, after falling in love with Cristina who had helped him achieve success, he convinces Elvira, a mild-mannered girl from the provinces, to follow him to Milan. Elvira soon gives him a son and remains close to him despite her betrayals. Cristina, who has now become a famous soprano, reappears again in the life of the master and tries to distance him from her partner but, after the triumph of La bohème, driven by her gratitude towards Elvira, Giacomo decides to marry her. This does not mean that her infidelities end and Elvira, increasingly alone, decides to separate from her husband. The episode of the suicide of a young maid madly in love with him and the sensational failure of Madama Butterfly upset Puccini's life: Elvira at this point reconciles with him and stays by his side assisting him generously until his death, which occurred from an incurable disease which strikes him during the composition of Turandot.

== Distribution ==
The distribution in Italy took place from April 29, 1953; in the same year the film entered the cinema circuit in West Germany and, from the following year, in other countries (in East Germany the film was released in 1955).

In some distributions the title adopted was: Puccini, I lived with art, I lived with love. In France it was distributed under the title: Trois amours de Puccini.

== Cast ==
- Gabriele Ferzetti: Giacomo Puccini
- Märta Torén: Elvira Puccini
- Nadia Gray: Cristina Vernini
- Paolo Stoppa: Giocondo
- Myriam Bru: Delia
- Sergio Tofano: Giulio Ricordi
- Mimo Billi: Fanelli
- Silvio Bagolini: Gianni
- Alessandro Fersen: Padre di Delia
- Jacques Famery: Antonio Puccini
- Carlo Duse: Arrigo Boito
- Piero Palermini: Ferdinando Fontana
- Oscar Andriani: Giuseppe Giacosa
- René Clermont: Luigi Illica
- Mario Feliciani: Enrico
- Renato Chiantoni: Filippo Tacchi
- Attilio Dottesio: Sampieri
