= The Captain of Venice =

1951 film

- Directed by: Gianni Puccini
- Written by: Luigi Bonelli; Celsa Maria Garatti; Sergio Grieco; Tullio Moretti; Gianni Puccini
- Produced by: Carlo Cecconi
- Starring: Leonardo Cortese; Mariella Lotti; Andrea Checchi
- Cinematography: Gianni di Venanzo
- Edited by: Enzo Alfonsi
- Music by: Mario Zafred
- Production company: Italica Film
- Release date: 1951
- Country: Italy
- Language: Italian

The Captain of Venice (Italian: Il Capitano di Venezia) is a 1951 Italian historical adventure film directed by Gianni Puccini and starring Leonardo Cortese, Mariella Lotti, and Andrea Checchi.

The film's sets were designed by the art director Arrigo Equini.

== Main cast ==
- Leonardo Cortese as Rizzardo
- Mariella Lotti as Ginevra
- Andrea Checchi as Ezzelino da Romano
- Dante Maggio as Papele Scaramuzza
- Franco Balducci as Marin Soldero
- Xenia Valderi as Gioia
- Pietro Tordi as Conte Gritti
- Gino Cavalieri
- Gino Latilla

== Bibliography ==
- Chiti, Roberto; Poppi, Roberto (1991). Dizionario del cinema italiano: Dal 1945 al 1959 (in Italian). Rome: Gremese Editore. ISBN 978-88-7605-548-5.
