= Professor, My Son =

- Directed by: Renato Castellani
- Written by: Renato Castellani; Aldo De Benedetti; Aldo Fabrizi; Suso Cecchi D'Amico; Fulvio Palmieri; Fausto Tozzi; Emilio Cecchi
- Produced by: Carlo Ponti
- Cinematography: Carlo Montuori
- Edited by: Mario Serandrei
- Music by: Nino Rota
- Release date: 1946
- Running time: 106 minutes
- Country: Italy
- Language: Italian

Professor, My Son (Italian: Mio figlio professore, also known as My Son, the Professor) is a 1946 Italian comedy-drama film written and directed by Renato Castellani.

== Plot ==
The janitor of a Roman school (Aldo Fabrizi) seeks social redemption by allowing his child, through many sacrifices, to study until becoming a teacher in the very school where he himself works.

== Cast ==
- Aldo Fabrizi as Orazio Belli
- Giorgio De Lullo as Orazio Belli jr.
- Mario Pisu as Ettore Giraldi
- Diana Nava as Diana Giraldi
- Lisetta Nava as Lisetta Giraldi
- Pinuccia Nava as Mrs. Maggi / Pinuccia Giraldi
- Nando Bruno as Angeloni
- Mario Soldati as Professor Bardelli
- Ercole Patti as Teacher
- Ennio Flaiano as Teacher
- Vincenzo Talarico as Teacher
