= Napoleon (1951 film) =

1951 film

- Directed by: Carlo Borghesio
- Written by: Steno; Mario Monicelli; Faele; Leo Benvenuti
- Produced by: Luigi Rovere
- Starring: Renato Rascel
- Cinematography: Renato Del Frate
- Edited by: Rolando Benedetti
- Music by: Nino Rota
- Release date: 1951
- Language: Italian

Napoleon (Italian: Napoleone) is a 1951 Italian comedy film directed by Carlo Borghesio and starring Renato Rascel in the title role.

== Cast ==
- Renato Rascel as Napoleon
- Marisa Merlini as Joséphine
- Lilia Silvi as Marie Luisa
- Carlo Ninchi as Murat
- Loris Gizzi as Minister Barras
- Sergio Tofano as General Vignon
- Raimondo Vianello as Cambronne
- Pietro Tordi as Uncle Enrico
- Nico Pepe as The Sergeant
- Mario Siletti as English Ambassador
- Corrado Annicelli as Minister of Foreign Affairs
- Salvo Libassi as Napoleonic Official
- Gianni Cajafa as Napoleonic Official
- Pierluigi Pelitti as Napoleonic Official
- Mimmo Billi as Professor of History
