= Vittorio Metz =

Italian screenwriter and film director (1904-1984)

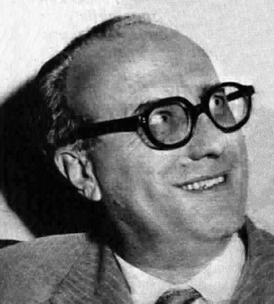
- Born: 18 July 1904; Rome, Italy
- Died: 11 March 1984 (aged 79); Rome, Italy
- Occupations: Screenwriter, film director
- Years active: 1914-1965

Vittorio Metz (18 July 1904 – 1 March 1984) was an Italian screenwriter and film director. He wrote for more than 110 films between 1939 and 1977.

== Selected filmography ==
- Defendant, Stand Up! (1939)
- Lo vedi come sei... lo vedi come sei? (1939)
- The Pirate's Dream (1940)
- Non me lo dire! (1940)
- Annabella's Adventure (1943)
- The Za-Bum Circus (1944)
- Macario Against Zagomar (1944)
- Toto Tours Italy (1948)
- Eleven Men and a Ball (1948)
- Be Seeing You, Father (1948)
- Adam and Eve (1949)
- Toto Looks for a House (1949)
- Figaro Here, Figaro There (1950)
- Totò Tarzan (1950)
- The Cadets of Gascony (1950)
- The Knight Has Arrived! (1950)
- Toto Looks for a Wife (1950)
- Toto the Sheik (1950)
- The Transporter (1950)
- Beauties on Bicycles (1951)
- Seven Hours of Trouble (1951)
- Toto the Third Man (1951)
- The Steamship Owner (1951)
- Free Escape (1951)
- I'm the Capataz (1951)
- The Reluctant Magician (1951)
- Arrivano i nostri (1951)
- Poppy (1952)
- If You Won a Hundred Million (1953)
- The Enchanting Enemy (1953)
- It Was She Who Wanted It! (1953)
- Red and Black (1955)
- Totò, Eva e il pennello proibito (1959)
- Appuntamento a Ischia (1960)
- Hercules in the Valley of Woe (1961)
- Sua Eccellenza si fermò a mangiare (1961)
- Appuntamento in Riviera (1962)
- Uno strano tipo (1963)
- 002 Operazione Luna (1965)
- The Most Beautiful Couple in the World (1968)
