= The White Sheik =

- Theatrical release poster
- Directed by: Federico Fellini
- Screenplay by: Federico Fellini; Tullio Pinelli; Ennio Flaiano
- Story by: Michelangelo Antonioni; Federico Fellini; Tullio Pinelli
- Produced by: Luigi Rovere
- Starring: Alberto Sordi; Leopoldo Trieste; Brunella Bovo; Giulietta Masina
- Cinematography: Arturo Gallea
- Edited by: Rolando Benedetti
- Music by: Nino Rota
- Production company: American International Pictures
- Release dates: 6 September 1952 (VFF); 20 September 1952 (Italy); 25 April 1956 (U.S.)
- Running time: 83 minutes
- Country: Italy
- Language: Italian
- Box office: $50,850

The White Sheik (Italian: Lo sceicco bianco) is a 1952 Italian romantic comedy film directed by Federico Fellini and starring Alberto Sordi, Leopoldo Trieste, Brunella Bovo and Giulietta Masina. Written by Fellini, Tullio Pinelli, Ennio Flaiano and Michelangelo Antonioni, the film is about a man who brings his new bride to Rome for their honeymoon, to have an audience with the Pope, and to present his wife to his family. When the young woman sneaks away to find the hero of her romance photonovels, the man is forced to spend hour after hour making excuses to his eager family who want to meet his missing bride. The White Sheik was filmed on location in Fregene, Rome, Spoleto and Vatican City.

In 2008, the film was included on the Italian Ministry of Cultural Heritage’s 100 Italian films to be saved, a list of 100 films that "have changed the collective memory of the country between 1942 and 1978."

== Plot ==
Two young newlyweds from a provincial town, Wanda (Brunella Bovo) and Ivan Cavalli (Leopoldo Trieste), arrive in Rome for their honeymoon. Wanda is obsessed with the "White Sheik" (Alberto Sordi), the Rudolph Valentino-like hero of a soap opera photo strip and sneaks off to find him, leaving her conventional, petit bourgeois husband in a quandary as he tries to hide his wife's disappearance from his strait-laced relatives who are waiting to go with them to visit the Pope.

== Cast ==
- Alberto Sordi as Fernando Rivoli, The White Sheik
- Leopoldo Trieste as Ivan Cavalli
- Brunella Bovo as Wanda Giardino Cavalli
- Giulietta Masina as Cabiria, the prostitute
- Lilia Landi as Felga, the photonovel's gipsy
- Ernesto Almirante as Dottore Fortuna, the photonovel's director
- Fanny Marchiò as Marilena Alba Vellardi
- Gina Mascetti as Aida Rivoli, the wife of Fernando
- Ugo Attanasio as Uncle of Ivan

== Production ==
The White Sheik was Fellini's first solo effort as a director. He had previously co-directed Variety Lights in 1950 with Alberto Lattuada.

Originally the treatment for The White Sheik was written by Michelangelo Antonioni. Carlo Ponti commissioned Fellini and Tullio Pinelli to develop the treatment. It was satirical in nature, targeting the trashy fotoromanzi comic strips that were extremely popular in Italy when the film was made.

The male lead, Leopoldo Trieste, a playwright who did not consider himself an actor, reluctantly auditioned for Fellini. During the audition Fellini asked him to compose a sonnet that the lead character would have written to his wife. The poem which begins "She is graceful, sweet and teeny..." was included in the film.

Appearing briefly as the prostitute Cabiria, Giulietta Masina would later return to this role in Nights of Cabiria. Her short scene inspired Fellini to write the screenplay and also convinced producers that Giulietta was ready for the leading role.

== Release ==
Janus Films released The White Sheik in the United States in 1956.

== Reception ==
Italian film critic Giulio Cesare Castello, writing for Cinema V, argued that Fellini's past as a successful strip cartoonist made him a natural choice as the film's director: "Fellini was undoubtedly the best qualified and for two reasons: firstly, his experience as a strip cartoonist and consequently his familiarity with the secrets and intrigues of the world he was about to bring to the screen; secondly, his gift for sarcastic comment and delight in satirizing tradition... The result is unusual and stimulating but derives more from the failure to establish a basic mood or tone rather than from any direct intention. Fellini should find this tone in future works if he is to avoid the discontinuity we found here."

== Soundtrack ==
Nino Rota scored the film.
