= Il monello della strada =

Il Monello della strada
- Directed by: Carlo Borghesio
- Written by: Leo Benvenuti; Marcello Marchesi; Vittorio Metz; Glauco Pellegrini
- Edited by: Rolando Benedetti
- Music by: Carlo Savina; Nino Rota
- Release date: 1951
- Country: Italy
- Language: Italian

Il Monello della strada is a 1951 Italian comedy film directed by Carlo Borghesio.

== Cast ==
- Erminio Macario: Carletto Po
- Ciccio Jacono: Paolino
- Luisa Rossi: Anna Galeazzi
- Saro Urzì: il commissario
- Franco Balducci: Arizona Bill
- Vittorina Benvenuti: Adele
- Pietro Tordi: Zeno
- Carlo Rizzo: Bastiano
