= Mario Amendola =

Italian screenwriter (1910 –1993)

- Born: Mario Natalino Concetto Amendola; 8 December 1910; Recco, Italy
- Died: 22 December 1993 (aged 83); Rome, Italy
- Occupations: Screenwriter; film director
- Years active: 1931–1987
- Relatives: Ferruccio Amendola (nephew); Claudio Amendola (great-nephew); Alessia Amendola (great-great-niece)

Mario Natalino Concetto Amendola (8 December 1910 – 22 December 1993) was an Italian screenwriter, film director and dramatist.

== Biography ==
Amendola was born in Recco, which is located in Genova to parents from Rome. He began his career on stage in 1931 as a writer for avanspettacolo shows. During that time, he wrote dialogue for Erminio Macario, Totò and more. He ended this profession and moved to cinema in 1949. He wrote for 153 films between 1941 and 1987. He also directed 37 films between 1949 and 1975. Amendola collaborated with Bruno Corbucci on conceiving the Nico Giraldi film series starring Tomas Milian.

Amendola died on December 12, 1993, from complications from diabetes.

== Selected filmography ==
- The Innocent Casimiro (1945)
- Romulus and the Sabines (1945)
- Eleven Men and a Ball (1948)
- Captain Demonio (1950)
- The Transporter (1950)
- Abbiamo vinto! (1951)
- The Passaguai Family (1951)
- Beauties on Bicycles (1951)
- Beauties on Motor Scooters (1952)
- The Dream of Zorro (1952)
- The Angels of the District (1952)
- The Piano Tuner Has Arrived (1952)
- Beauties in Capri (1952)
- I, Hamlet (1952)
- Five Paupers in an Automobile (1952)
- The Passaguai Family Gets Rich (1952)
- The Two Friends (1955)
- The Song of the Heart (1955)
- L'amore nasce a Roma (1958)
- Prepotenti più di prima (1959)
- Il terrore dell'Oklahoma (1959)
- Toto's First Night (1962)
- Sexy Toto (1963)
- The Thief of Damascus (1964)
- Honeymoon, Italian Style (1966)
- Trap for Seven Spies (1967)
- The Great Silence (1968)
- Zum zum zum - La canzone che mi passa per la testa (1969)
- Pasqualino Cammarata, Frigate Captain (1974)
- A forza di sberle (1974)
- Di che segno sei? (1975)
- Africa Express (1976)
- Messalina, Messalina (1977)
