= Women in Italian neorealism =

Women in Italian Neorealism
- Years active: 1943-1952
- Location: Italy
- Influenced: French New Wave, Cinema Novo, Iranian New Wave

Filmic representations of women have developed in tandem with changing historical and socio-cultural influences. Italian neorealism was a movement that, through art and film, attempted to "[recover] the reality of Italy" for an Italian society that was disillusioned by the propaganda of fascism. Representations of women in this era were influenced heavily by the suffrage movement and changing socio-political awareness of gender rights. The tension of this transitional era created a spectrum of female representation in film, where female characters were written to acquiesce, or more commonly reject, the societal standards imposed on the women of the age. Italian neorealists, with their characteristic use of realism and thematic-driven narrative, used their medium to explore these established ideals of gender and produce a number of filmic representations of women.

== Socio-economic context of Italy in the 1940-50s ==
In the mid-twentieth century, Italy existed in a transitional state as it emerged from the decline of Fascism and into the establishment of itself as a new republic. As a member of the Axis Powers, the impact of losing the war was extremely detrimental in terms of the immediate economic and social burden it placed on the country- resources, be it human, natural or capital, were extremely limited. It is during this time of economic crisis that cultural industries, like the Italian film industry, began to shift their approach in the creation and production of services to make use of limited resources, as well as create goods i.e. films, that appropriately addressed the political climate of the era. As a result, the cultural media produced in this era was realist in nature, reflecting the stories of socio-economic hardship experienced by all classes of Italian society.

However, this loss of socio-economic status was accounted for after the first decade post-World War II, when the country experienced a miracle economic boom.

=== The role of gender ===
In terms of a post-World War II social context, Italy, as a republic, began to increase economic and social opportunity for Italian women, with the first Republican Parliament of 1948–1953 being represented by highly educated, accomplished, radical, militant women. However, despite the radical presence of women in Italy's emerging political framework, the role of traditional gender stereotypes still persisted in the perception of women in society. The expectation of female politicians to be presented as "[an] attractive and natural [image]..." yet not overly sexual is an example of the dichotomous expectations placed on experiences of womanliness in the era. The influence of these expectations is considered to be significant enough that the simultaneous appeal and rejection of a sexualised womanly figure, and the implications of this conflict, was reflected in the Neorealists' response to the country's period of socio-economic upheaval.

== Neorealism as an artistic response ==
Italian neorealism spanned the tail-end of World War II and the start of the establishment of the Italian Republic, being active during the years: 1943–1952. In response to the moral devastation of World War II and the decline of Mussolini's fascist regime, Italian filmmakers began to reject the traditional cinematic conventions of the preceding filmic era. The genre of Telefoni Bianchi was one of two dominating genres of pre-war Italy. It involved highly slapstick and aesthetically driven performances, with a distinct lack of substance and meaning behind the narrative, characterisation and production. The second most popular genre was Calligrafismo. This style of filmmaking revolved around the production of traditional, classic Italian literature, most of which was considered high-brow and esoteric. However, the films made both these genres, despite their aesthetic differences, generally served the purpose of producing propagandic cultural material for the Fascist regime in Italy.

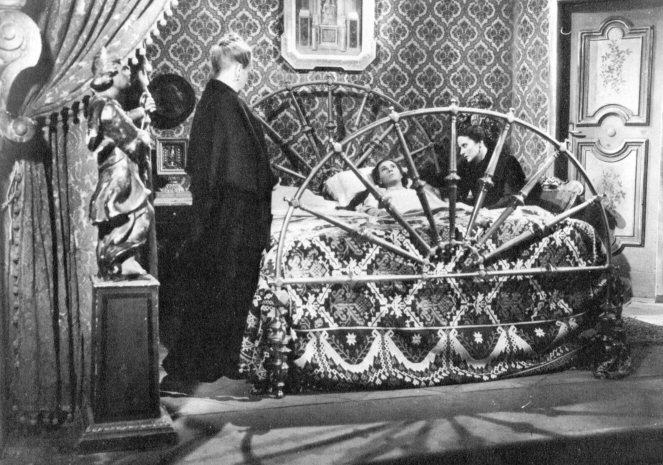
A scene from the Calligrafismo film La bella addormantata (1942)

In addition to this, the progression and eventual conclusion of the Second World War, resulted in the destruction of Cinecittà, the largest Roman studio complex, and the general shortage of production resources like sets, lighting and sound equipment. Italian Neorealism arose as an artistic response to the combination of these social and economic factors, and as a result, Neorealist mise-en-scene was dependent on actual locales and the use of unprofessional actors. The situational nature of these characteristics further contribute to the consideration of the genre as not just "politically committed", but also a style of national film with an extreme inclination to social awareness and justice, in contrast to Hollywood's intense focus on the glamour and stardom-driven nature of their filmmaking process and industry. In addition to this, the Neorealist narrative tended to concern itself with the realist portrayals of post-war, Italian life. The purpose of the films of the era was to provide a depiction of the real-life consequences of poverty and war, and the impact of these experiences on the national, Italian identity. As a consequence, Italian Neorealism and the artistic endeavours generated from its influence, are considered to be a response from the cultural industries of the era, to the changing moral, economic, social and human values of the time.

== Significant Characterisations ==
Portrayals of femininity and womanhood in Neorealist films were influenced by the liberation of societal attitudes from the influence of Fascist ideologies. Arising from this transitional state was a "spectrum" of representation, where the femme fatale represented one end of the spectrum "and the natural woman represent[ed] the other... [with] the prostitute somewhere in the middle." Neorealists' rejection of Fascist stereotypes, such as that of the subjugated woman, is personified in these three tropes, with both the roles being expressed as strong, feminine presences compensating for a weaker, male lead. Nevertheless, some Neorealist filmmakers, such as Frederico Fellini, despite engaging in the establishment of strong female leads, did also make use of "sexual stereotypes," with many of their explorations into the human experience rooted in socially conventional portrayals of women. However, due to the progressive, thematic motivation of Neorealist screenplays, many of these stereotypes were either invalidated or subverted through the lens of a Neorealist narrative arc.

=== Natural Woman vs Prostitute ===
==== Natural Woman ====
A significant character in Italian Neorealism is the "natural woman", who is characterised in a post-war world and depicted to "have her roots in the cult of fertility, rurality, creativity." The germination of this "natural goodness" lies in the historical influence of Catholicism on the values and structure of Italian society, as well as the Neorealists' rejection of the excessive and consumeristic "diva" characters of a pre-war, Fascist Italy. In the context of an increasingly radical and progressive Italian society, the natural woman was able to express these values through a liberated sexuality. This combination of sexuality with the identity of a modern, Italian woman is shown to be an artistic response to the evolving, foundational values of a post-War Italian society.

===== Rome, Open City =====
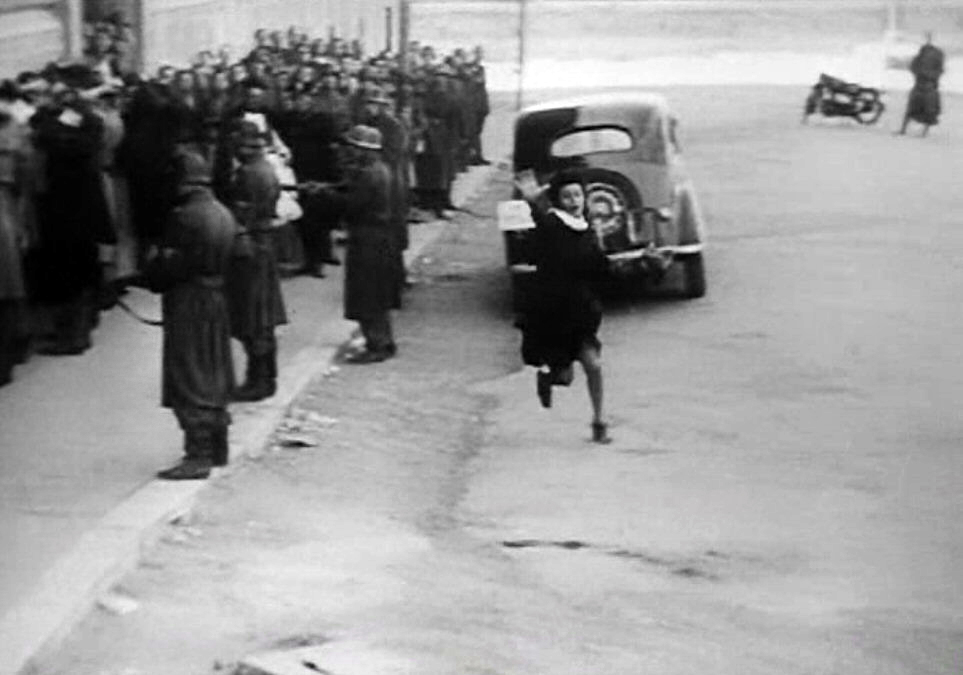
Anna Magnani as Pina in a scene from Rome, Open City

Roberto Rosselini's 1945 Neorealist film Rome, Open City presents his iteration of the natural woman through the characterisation of Pina. Pina is a woman who is shown to have engaged in premarital sex, an identifier of her liberated sexuality, while simultaneously being an epitome of natural, Italian values through her political activism, natural demeanour and dress. The duality of her characterisation is a reflection of the ideals valued by the evolving social standards of the time, consistent with the context of the women's suffrage movement preceding it, and the feminist movement following it. By presenting this dichotomy, Rosselini presents a female lead who, not only in terms of aesthetic but also personality, rejects the excess, luxury and one-dimensional nature of the divas in the Fascist film period.

==== Prostitute ====
In contrast to this, another significant characterisation in this particular film period was that of the prostitute. In a period of economic scarcity, the character of the prostitute was the "nodal point at which economic survival and sexuality [met]", with this representation of femininity depicted by the Neorealists' as an expression of an Italian womanhood that is independent of male authority. The popularity of the prostitute trope amongst Neorealist writers and directors is considered to be another attempt (in addition to the Natural Woman) at integrating the role of sexuality with the experience of being a modern, Italian woman. However, these representations are also considered to be reflective of the anxieties of both the Italian, as well as the global, audience in the changing role of women in society, in the second half of the 20th century.

===== Nights of Cabiria =====
Fellini's Nights of Cabiria depicts the eponymous prostitute's, eventually vain, search for true love. Initially, the film is seen as purporting gender stereotypes of a woman in desperation and need of a man's validation and love. However, the climatic failure of Cabiria's search is shown to enable her rebirth into a "moral environment [that is] so highly evolved that [her love interest] and all that he embodies are no longer possible." Fellini depicts Cabiria's psychological journey to independence and freedom, through her interaction with the same sociological ideals (of love and acceptance) that confine her, to present a complicated female protagonist whose struggle with identity reflects the struggle of the modern, Italian woman. By providing an example of complexity and depth in his female characters, Fellini's representation of female identity and its liberation from the influence of male identity, through the protagonist's personal failure, is an example of the subversion of the stereotypical representations of women in Italian cinema, as well as a subversion of the gendered expectations placed on Italian women of the era.

=== Femme Fatale ===
Film noir was a film movement that dominated the mid to early-20th century space in Hollywood history and popularised the use of the femme fatale trope. It established an intersection of "freedom, fascination and erotic intrigue" with the identity of a woman, an ideal that was conducive to its popularity in the context of a burgeoning feminist movement. In Italian Neorealism, the femme fatale trope is used as a medium to translate the dominating influence of Hollywood on the global film industry. The translation of this cross-cultural filmic influence was readily accepted by Italian audiences. However, Italian Neorealists personalised this trope and tailored it to the needs of their own socio-cultural context by creating their characters on the spectrum of representation i.e. from the natural woman to the femme fatale. Characteristics such as sexual prowess, extreme social independence and notions of eroticism were justified in Italy's national cinema through the suggestion that they are derivatives of feminine nature i.e. the natural woman. The existence of these feminine qualities in an Italian, Neorealist femme fatale is seen to shift the perception of her as villainous or immoral; rather she is seen, through the Neorealist lens, as an expression of female autonomy and liberation.

== Impact ==
As a result of the burgeoning economic prosperity experienced by Italy in the late 1950s, the appeal of Neorealism began to decrease. The narratives of economic adversity and war that were characteristic of the genre, began to become increasingly irrelevant to the attitudes of society, as they transitioned into a period of affluence and profitability. Hence, the overall popularity of the genre began to decline. However, Neorealist filmmakers' introduction of Realism to mainstream cinematic circles and their exploration of complex, female characters did have an impact on the film movements that followed it, in the latter half of the 20th century.

=== French New Wave ===
Stylistically, the French New Wave adopted technical aspects e.g. amateur actors, experimental editing, naturalist mise-en-scene from Italian Neorealism. The New Wave auteurs also adopted the Neorealists' desire to explore the socio-cultural issues that existed in society, including those regarding gender and the role of women. The concept of a woman being "freed" from some form of societal constraint was a theme that linked the French New Wave with the Italian Neorealists. Despite not directly adopting the major Neorealist tropes of gender, New Wave auteurs explored ideas around the "mobilised female gaze." Popularised by Fellini in his road film La Strada, this intersection of the concept of wandering and the feminine experience, is depicted in a significant French New Wave film: Agnes Varda's 1962 film Cleo from 5 to 7. The protagonist's constant roaming of the Parisian streets and moments of self-reflection, under a dominantly masculine gaze, is interpreted to be a "walk of emancipation." Similarly to Fellini's "Nights of Cabiria", the complexity of character that arises from the male-female dynamic, and its relationship with a woman's liberated identity, is a marker of the Neorealist influence on this film.
