= Anna Maria Ackermann =

Italian actress (1932–2025)

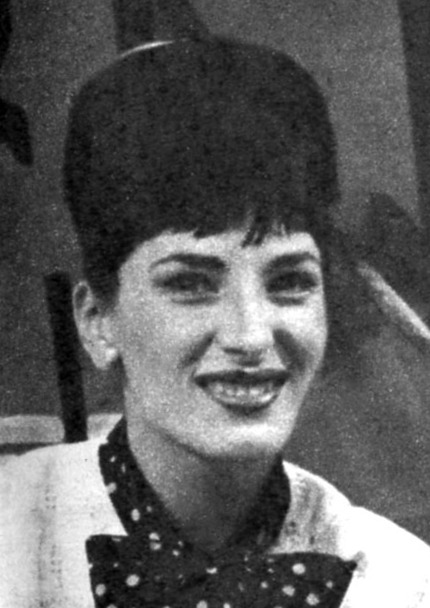
- Ackermann, in 1962
- Born: 24 December 1932; Naples, Kingdom of Italy
- Died: 15 January 2025 (aged 92); Naples, Italy
- Occupation: Actress

Anna Maria Ackermann (24 December 1932 – 15 January 2025) was an Italian actress.

== Life and career ==
Ackermann debuted with Eduardo De Filippo, for whom she played young actress roles in numerous comedies he wrote and directed.

In the 1960s, she participated in radio dramas and was a regular guest on the Sunday morning programme Spaccanapoli.

On television, she took part in numerous dramas, including the detective series Le inchieste del commissario Maigret (1967), Sherlock Holmes: L'ultimo dei Baskerville (1968), La donna di cuori (1969), Un certo Harry Brent (1970), the drama Il cappello del prete (1970) based on the novel of the same name by Emilio De Marchi and La Medea di Porta Medina (1981).

For the cinema she starred in Liliana Cavani's The Skin (1981), I figli... so' pezzi 'e core (1982) with Mario Merola, Luigi Magni's 'O Re (1989), with Giancarlo Giannini and Ornella Muti.

For the theatre, her performance in Sorelle Materassi, from the novel by Aldo Palazzeschi (1988), Sò dieci anne by Libero Bovio (1999), Femminile napoletano by Arnolfo Petri, on poetic texts by Salvatore Palomba (2000), Le sorprese del divorzio (2003) and others.

She had also starred in many poetry and prose recitals.

From 2009, she collaborated with the Narni Literature Festival, directed by Esther Basile.

In 2011, she lent her voice to the play 'Birthday Party' by Angela Matassa and Giovanna Castellano, directed and performed by Arnolfo Petri and premiered at Teatro Belli in Rome.

In addition to her work as an actress, she devoted herself to teaching acting and diction at the Totò theatre in Naples. She taught diction and literature to Neapolitan artists, including Gennaro Silvestro, Alessandro Siani and Niko Depp.

Ackermann died on 15 January 2025, at the age of 92.
