= Giulio Battiferri =

Italian actor (1893–1973)

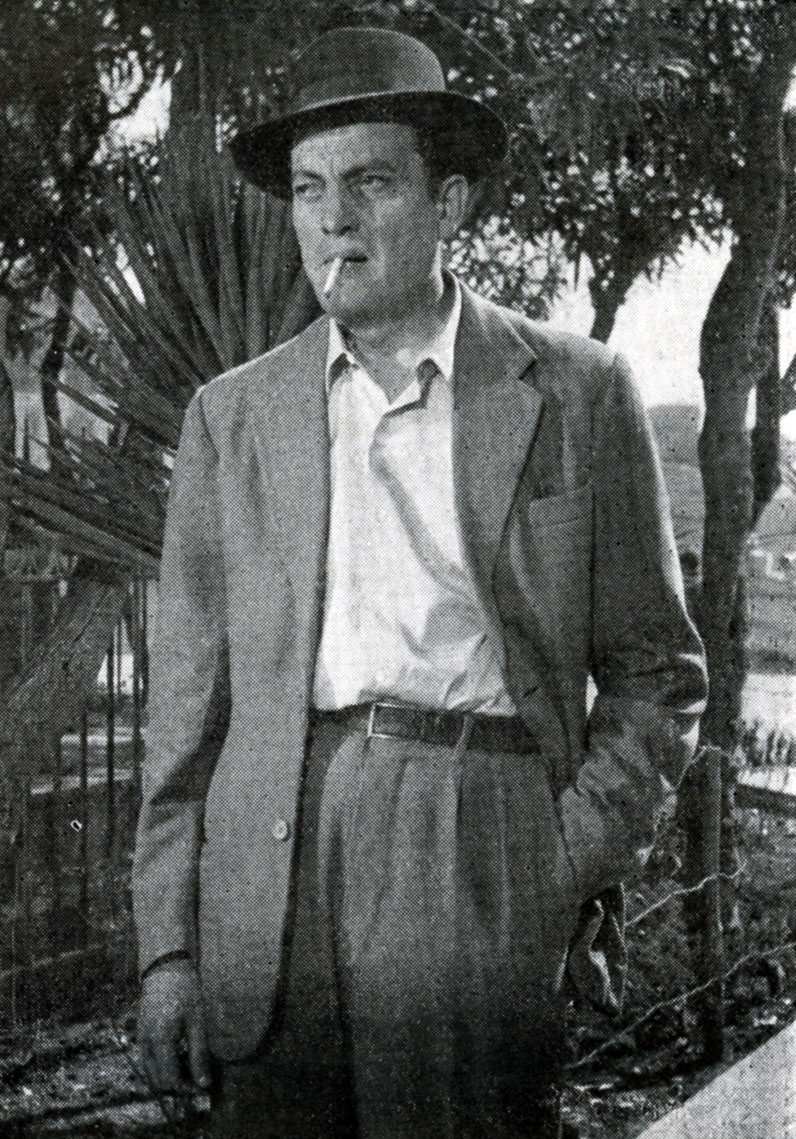
- Born: 15 July 1893; Rome, Italy
- Died: 22 January 1973 (aged 79); Rome, Italy
- Occupation: Actor
- Years active: 1939–1972

Giulio Battiferri (15 July 1893 – 22 January 1973) was an Italian actor. He appeared in more than one hundred films from 1939 to 1972. He was married to the actress Pina Piovani.

== Life and career ==
Born in Rome, Battiferri started his career on stage in 1913, working alongside his wife Pina Piovani in the Romanesco dialect stage company Compagnia Romanesca directed by Gastone Monaldi. With this and other companies directed by Monaldi he toured nationally and abroad, performing in England, France, Spain and South America. After the death of Monaldi, he specialized in the revue genre.

Sporadically active in films of the silent era, starting from 1939 he became one of the most active Italian character actors of his time. He was the brother of the silent film actress Fernanda Battiferri.

== Filmography ==
Year	Title	Role	Notes
1936	Tredici uomini e un cannone		
1939	I, His Father		
1939	Follie del secolo	L'uomo con il cartellone pubblicitario	
1940	Validità giorni dieci	Il signore nervoso sul treno	
1940	One Hundred Thousand Dollars	Un radiotelegrafista	Uncredited
1940	Kean	Un acrobata	
1940	The Palace on the River		
1940	The Siege of the Alcazar	L'aiutante del Capo di Stato Maggiore	Uncredited
1940	The Pirate's Dream	Un falso pirata	Uncredited
1940	La fanciulla di Portici	Guzman	
1940	La zia smemorata	Il cameriere del bar	
1940	Non me lo dire!	Il capo dei creditori	
1940	The Daughter of the Green Pirate	Un pirata	Uncredited
1941	The King's Jester	Il portiere dell'albergo Reale	
1941	The Prisoner of Santa Cruz	Il capitano Leroux	Uncredited
1941	Schoolgirl Diary	Il giardiniere	Uncredited
1941	Il cavaliere senza nome		
1941	The King Has Fun	Uno dei rapitori di Gilda	
1941	Amore imperiale		
1941	The Betrothed	Un rivoluzionario	Uncredited
1941	Solitudine	Il portiere dell'albergo	
1942	Captain Tempest		
1942	Black Gold	Il galante corteggiatore di Grazia	
1942	Tragic Night	Gino	Uncredited
1942	La fortuna viene dal cielo	Il commissario	
1942	The Adventures of Fra Diavolo	Un brigante	
1942	The Lion of Damascus		
1942	Before the Postman	Pietro, un tranviere	Uncredited
1942	We the Living	Member of the Epuration Commission	Uncredited
1942	La morte civile	Un forzato	Uncredited
1942	Rossini		Uncredited
1942	I due Foscari	Il primo soldato	
1942	Il fanciullo del West	Jim, il postiglione	
1942	Pazzo d'amore		
1943	Dagli Appennini alle Ande	Sultano, un contadino	
1943	Calafuria	Michele	Uncredited
1943	Rita of Cascia	Lampo - il servo spia del barone	Uncredited
1943	The Last Wagon	Un vetturino	
1944	Macario Against Zagomar	Un 'apache'	
1944	Mist on the Sea	Il direttore della ditta commerciale	
1946	Before Him All Rome Trembled	Bruno	
1947	The White Primrose		
1948	L'ebreo errante		
1948	Bicycle Thieves	Citizen Who Protects the Real Thief	Uncredited
1949	Marechiaro	Il marinario invidisio	
1950	Streets of Sorrow	Mario	
1950	Margaret of Cortona	Contadino pronto al linciaggio	
1950	Santo disonore	Sivieri	
1950	Against the Law		
1950	Night Taxi		
1950	The Bread Peddler	Jules Labroue	
1950	Figaro Here, Figaro There		
1951	The Devil in the Convent		
1951	Tomorrow Is Another Day		
1951	I'm the Capataz		
1951	Love and Blood		
1951	Shadows Over Naples		
1951	Three Steps North		
1951	Cameriera bella presenza offresi...	Un vetturino	Uncredited
1951	Messalina	MarcoMarcus	Uncredited
1951	The Passaguai Family	The Taxi Driver	Uncredited
1951	Porca miseria	The Grocer	
1952	Torment of the Past	Peppino	
1952	The Eternal Chain		
1952	Ergastolo	Inmate	
1952	Red Shirts	Un civile	Uncredited
1952	Toto and the King of Rome	Guardiano	Uncredited
1952	La colpa di una madre		
1952	The Mute of Portici	Andrea	
1952	Non è vero... ma ci credo	The Prosecutor	
1952	Il tallone di Achille	Giornalaio	
1953	Good Folk's Sunday		Uncredited
1953	The Daughter of the Regiment		
1953	Bread, Love and Dreams	Vice Brigadiere Bolognini	
1953	La figlia del forzato		
1954	The Island Monster	Il rapitore	
1954	It Takes Two to Sin in Love		
1954	Letter from Naples	Juan	
1954	Prima di sera	Portiere	
1954	Loving You Is My Sin	Tanzi - the police commissioner	
1954	Love Song		
1955	The Red Cloak		
1955	Proibito		
1955	Beautiful but Dangerous		Uncredited
1955	La moglie è uguale per tutti	The Nightclub Waiter in Leopoldo Rossi's Dream	Uncredited
1955	Il campanile d'oro		
1956	Uncle Hyacynth	Lechero	
1956	Lo spadaccino misterioso		
1956	The Violent Patriot		
1956	The Rival	Nanni	Uncredited
1957	The Black Devil		
1957	The Mysteries of Paris	Georges	
1957	Il cocco di mamma	The Nightclub Manager	
1957	The Mighty Crusaders	Ambasciatore mussulmano	
1958	The Pirate of the Black Hawk	Nerone	
1958	The Sword and the Cross	Centurione Romano	
1959	The Pirate and the Slave Girl	Drunkard at the Tavern	
1960	Knight of 100 Faces	Bertuccio	
1960	Queen of the Pirates	The Boatswain	
1960	Pirates of the Coast	Doctor	
1961	Queen of the Seas	Prison Guard	
1961	Rage of the Buccaneers	Tortuga's first man	
1962	His Days Are Numbered	Spartaco	
1962	Charge of the Black Lancers	Il carceriere di Mascia	
1962	Gladiator of Rome	Spy Slave	
1962	Lo sceicco rosso	Carceriere	
1962	Tiger of the Seven Seas	Puertorican, the Innkeeper	
1964	Hercules and the Black Pirates		
1964	White Voices	Meo's Father	
1965	The Adventurer of Tortuga	Filibuster Pen	
1966	Superargo Versus Diabolicus		
1967	Golden Chameleon	Giuseppe	
1971	Joe Dakota	Barista	
1971	Duck, You Sucker!	Miguel	(final film role)
