= The Innkeeper =

1944 Italian historical comedy film

- Luisa Ferida and Mario Pisu
- Directed by: Luigi Chiarini
- Written by: Carlo Goldoni (play); Umberto Barbaro; Francesco Pasinetti; Luigi Chiarini
- Starring: Luisa Ferida; Armando Falconi; Osvaldo Valenti; Camillo Pilotto
- Cinematography: Carlo Nebiolo
- Edited by: Maria Rosada
- Music by: Achille Longo
- Production company: Società Italiana Cines
- Distributed by: ENIC
- Release date: 23 December 1944
- Running time: 71 minutes
- Country: Italy
- Language: Italian

The Innkeeper (Italian: La locandiera also known as Mirandolina) is a 1944 Italian historical comedy film directed by Luigi Chiarini and starring Luisa Ferida, Armando Falconi and Osvaldo Valenti. The film is an adaptation of Carlo Goldoni's 1753 play The Mistress of the Inn, one of a number of times the work has been turned into films. It belongs to the movies of the calligrafismo style.

== Production ==
The film was originally shot in Rome. During the last stages of completion, Mussolini was overthrown. The final editing was done in Venice, the film capital of the Italian Social Republic, but without the presence of Chiarini. Two of its stars Luisa Ferida and Osvaldo Valenti were later executed by Italian Partisans for collaboration with the Fascist leadership.

== Cast ==
- Luisa Ferida as Mirandolina
- Armando Falconi as Il marchese di Forlimpopoli
- Osvaldo Valenti as Il cavaliere di Ripafratta
- Camillo Pilotto as Il conte di Albafiorita
- Elsa De Giorgi as Ortensia, l'attrice
- Paola Borboni as Dejanira, l'attrice
- Olga Solbelli as La contessa di Albafiorita
- Mario Pisu as Fabrizio
- Carlo Micheluzzi as Orazio, il capocomico
- Emilio Baldanello as Brighella
- Ernesto Zanon as Arlecchino
- Mario Siletti as Pandolfo, il servo di Ripafratta
- Pina Piovani as Lucrezia, la cameriera della locanda
- Andrea Volo as Florindo
- Clara Vaschetti as La domestica delle attrici
- Gino Cervi as Il poeta
- Igilda Bertina
- Giulia Toscani
- Liliana Ruffo
- Saro Urzì

== Bibliography ==
- Brunetta, Gian Piero. The History of Italian Cinema: A Guide to Italian Film from Its Origins to the Twenty-first Century. Princeton University Press, 2009.
- Moliterno, Gino. The A to Z of Italian Cinema. Scarecrow Press, 2009.
- Reich, Jacqueline & Garofalo, Piero. Re-viewing Fascism: Italian Cinema, 1922-1943. Indiana University Press, 2002.
