= Xenia Valderi =

Dalmatian Italian actress (1926–2008)

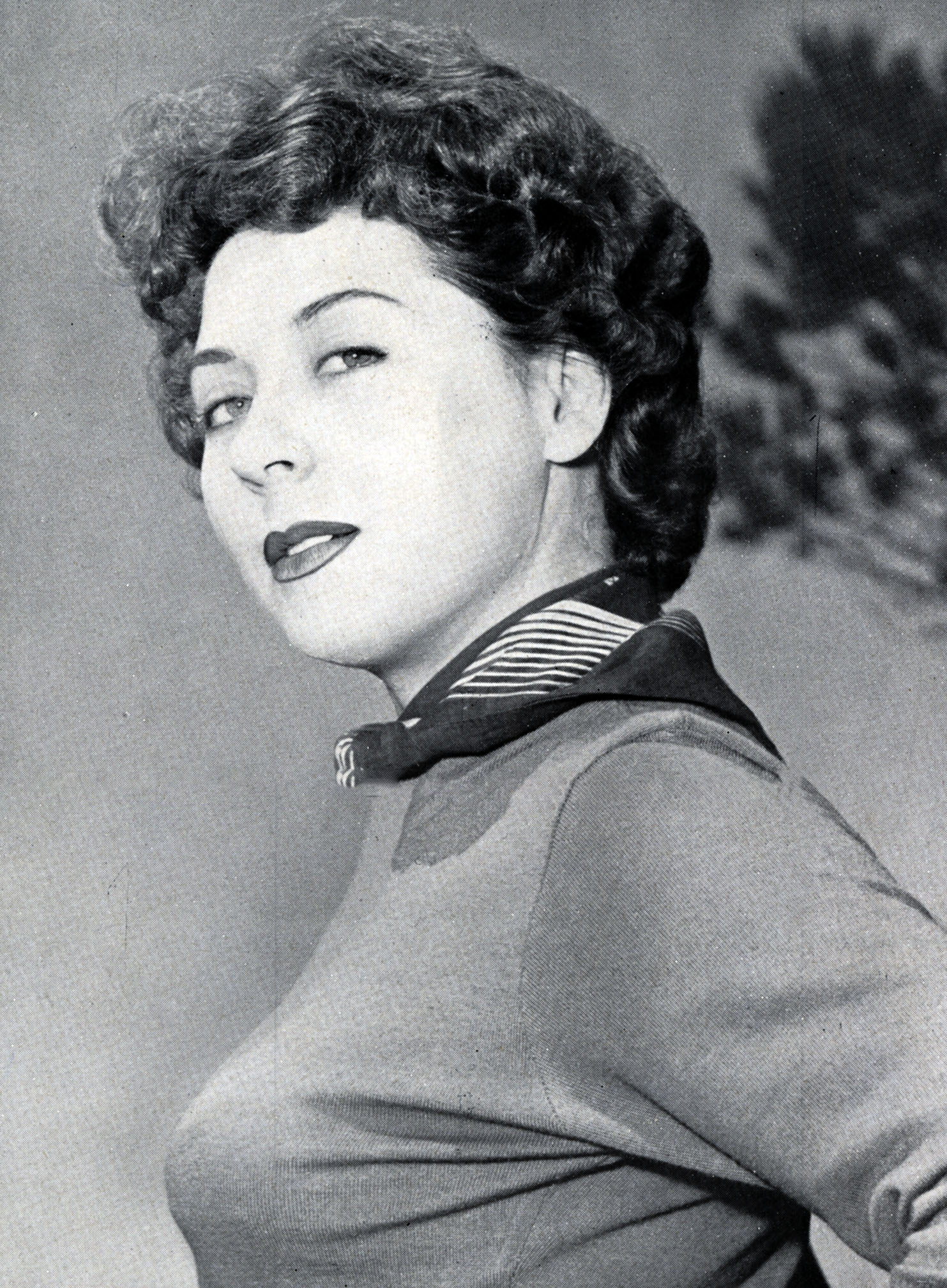
- Valderi in 1953
- Born: Xenia Valdameri; 21 January 1926; Split, Kingdom of Serbs, Croats and Slovenes
- Died: 3 November 2008 (aged 82); Castelnuovo di Porto, Italy
- Occupation: Actress

Xenia Valderi (21 January 1926 – 3 November 2008) was a Dalmatian Italian actress.

== Early life ==
The daughter of a Dalmatian Italian father and German mother, Xenia Valderi (née Valdameri) was born at Split in today's Croatia. She moved to Rome as a young woman after World War II, for a career in acting.

== Career ==
Xenia Valderi (she used a shorter version of her original surname) appeared regularly in Italian films of the 1950s and 1960s, including Gianni Puccini's The Captain of Venice (1951), Mario Amendola and Ruggero Maccari's Il tallone di Achille (1952), Carlo Borghesio's The Steel Rope (1953), Luigi Comencini's La valigia dei sogni (1953), Luigi Zampa's Woman of Rome (1954) with Gina Lollabrigida, Lionello De Felice's Too Young for Love (1955), De Felice's Desperate Farewell (1955), Federico Fellini's Il Bidone (1955), De Felice's 100 Years of Love (1954), Mario Mattoli's Move and I'll Shoot (1958), Mattoli's Non perdiamo la testa (1959), Lucio Fulci's The Swindlers (1963), Michelangelo Antonioni's Red Desert (1964), with Monica Vitti and Richard Harris, and Ettore Maria Fizzarotti Mi vedrai tornare (1966). She was specialized in bourgeois, snobby and often scatterbrained characters. She was also featured in some Italian television programs and on the musical comedy stage.

== Personal life and death ==
Xenia Valderi was said to be romantically involved with fellow actor Jacques Sernas in 1954.

Valderi died in Castelnuovo di Porto on 3 November 2008, at the age of 87.
