= Street of the Five Moons =

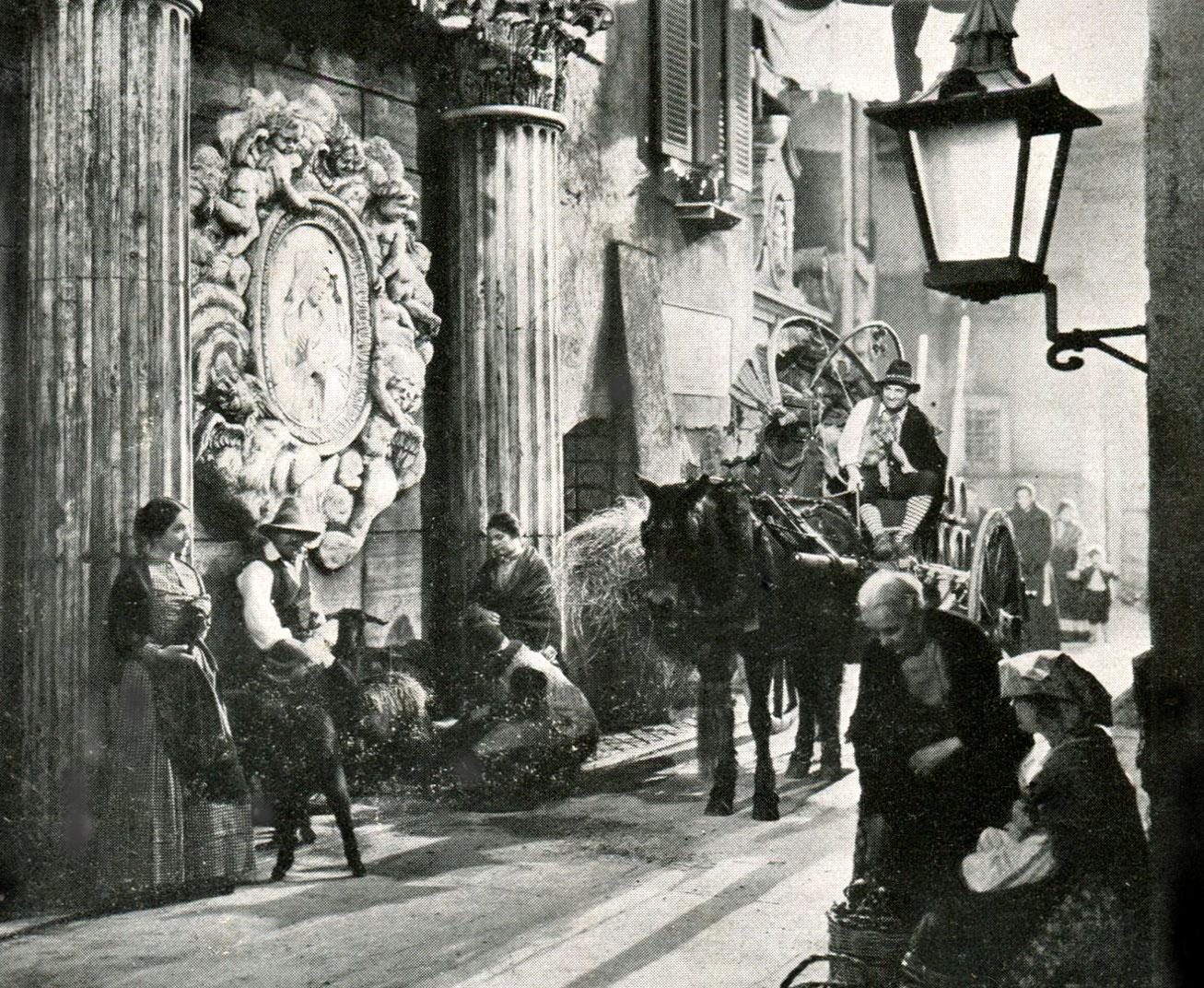
- Directed by: Luigi Chiarini
- Written by: Matilde Serao (story); Umberto Barbaro; Francesco Pasinetti; Piero Pierotti; Luigi Chiarini
- Starring: Luisella Beghi; Olga Solbelli; Andrea Checchi; Gildo Bocci
- Cinematography: Carlo Montuori
- Edited by: Mario Serandrei
- Music by: Achille Longo
- Production company: CSC
- Distributed by: ENIC
- Release date: 11 May 1942
- Running time: 80 minutes
- Country: Italy
- Language: Italian

Street of the Five Moons (Italian: Via delle Cinque Lune) is a 1942 romantic drama film, from a novel of Matilde Serao (O Giovannino o la morte), directed by Luigi Chiarini. It marked the debut of actor Gabriele Ferzetti. It belongs to the movies of the calligrafismo style.

== Cast ==
- Luisella Beghi - Ines
- Olga Solbelli -Sora Teta
- Andrea Checchi - Checco
- Gildo Bocci - Federico, padre di Ines
- Teresa Franchini - Suor Teresa
- Maria Jacobini - Suor Maria
- Dhia Cristiani - Maria
- Ciro Berardi - Pietro, il marito di Anna
- Pina Piovani - Anna
- Carlo Bressan - Il "professore"
- Michele Riccardini - Michele
- Aristide Garbini - Romolo
- Gorella Gori - La comare grassottella
- Gabriele Ferzetti
