= Sleeping Beauty (1942 film) =

1942 film

- Directed by: Luigi Chiarini
- Written by: Pier Maria Rosso di San Secondo (play); Umberto Barbaro; Vitaliano Brancati; Luigi Chiarini
- Starring: Luisa Ferida; Amedeo Nazzari; Osvaldo Valenti; Teresa Franchini
- Cinematography: Carlo Montuori
- Edited by: Maria Rosada
- Music by: Achille Longo
- Production company: Società Italiana Cines
- Distributed by: ENIC
- Release date: 6 September 1942
- Running time: 90 minutes
- Country: Italy
- Language: Italian

Sleeping Beauty (Italian: La bella addormentata) is a 1942 Italian drama film directed by Luigi Chiarini and starring Luisa Ferida, Amedeo Nazzari and Osvaldo Valenti. The film was screened at the 1942 Venice Film Festival. It is based on a 1919 play by Pier Maria Rosso di San Secondo. It belongs to the movies of the calligrafismo style.

== Cast ==
- Luisa Ferida as Carmela
- Amedeo Nazzari as Salvatore detto 'Il Nero della solfara'
- Osvaldo Valenti as Don Vincenzo Caramandola
- Teresa Franchini as Zia Agata
- Pina Piovani as Nunziata
- Margherita Bossi as Donna Concetta, la barista
- Giovanni Dolfini as Isidoro
- Guido Celano as Lo solfataro
- Angelo Dessy as Un altro solfataro
- Fiorella Betti as Erminia detta "Pepespezie"
- Gildo Bocci as Un mercante

== Bibliography ==
- Brunetta, Gian Piero. The History of Italian Cinema: A Guide to Italian Film from Its Origins to the Twenty-first Century. Princeton University Press, 2009.
- Moliterno, Gino. The A to Z of Italian Cinema. Scarecrow Press, 2009.
