= The Wolf of the Sila =

- Directed by: Duilio Coletti
- Written by: Giuseppe Gironda; Mario Monicelli; Carlo Musso; Ivo Perilli; Steno; Vincenzo Talarico
- Produced by: Dino De Laurentiis
- Starring: Silvana Mangano; Amedeo Nazzari; Vittorio Gassman; Jacques Sernas
- Cinematography: Aldo Tonti
- Edited by: Adriana Novelli
- Music by: Enzo Masetti; Osvaldo Minervini
- Production company: Lux Film
- Distributed by: Lux Film
- Release date: December 1949
- Running time: 95 minutes
- Country: Italy
- Language: Italian

The Wolf of the Sila (Italian: Il lupo della Sila) is a 1949 Italian drama film directed by Duilio Coletti and starring Silvana Mangano, Amedeo Nazzari and Vittorio Gassman. Much of the film was shot on location around La Sila in Calabria.

== Synopsis ==
After the death of her brother at the hands of the police, a young woman takes her revenge on the two men she believes to have been responsible.

== Cast ==
- Silvana Mangano as Rosaria Campolo
- Amedeo Nazzari as Rocco Barra
- Vittorio Gassman as Pietro Campolo
- Jacques Sernas as Salvatore Barra
- Luisa Rossi as Orsola Barra
- Olga Solbelli as La madre di Rosaria
- Dante Maggio as Gennaro
- Michele Capezzuoli as Salvatore da bambino
- Laura Cortese as Rosaria da bambina
- Attilio Dottesio as Un contadino
- Rudy Randi as Contadino

== Bibliography ==
- Forgacs, David & Gundle, Stephen. Mass Culture and Italian Society from Fascism to the Cold War. Indiana University Press, 2007.
