= Loving You Is My Sin =

1953 film by Sergio Grieco

- Directed by: Sergio Grieco
- Written by: Leonardo Benvenuti; Sergio Grieco; Ottavio Poggi
- Starring: Jacques Sernas; Luisa Rossi; Elisa Cegani
- Cinematography: Giorgio Orsini
- Edited by: Antonietta Zita
- Music by: Ezio Carabella
- Production companies: Gladio Film; Po Film
- Release date: 1953
- Running time: 89 minutes
- Country: Italy
- Language: Italian

Loving You Is My Sin (Italian: Amarti è il mio peccato (Suor Celeste)) is a 1953 Italian melodrama film directed by Sergio Grieco and starring Jacques Sernas, Luisa Rossi and Elisa Cegani.

== Cast ==
- Jacques Sernas as Count Giorgio Danieli
- Luisa Rossi as Elena Galassi Monti
- Elisa Cegani as Countess Danieli - Giorgio's mother
- Alba Arnova as Valeria Ferri - Elena's friend
- Jole Fierro as Sister Luisa
- Patrizia Lari as Countess Laura Danieli - Giorgio's sister
- Pina Piovani as The Mother Superior
- Carlo Tamberlani as Monti - Elena's father
- Giulio Battiferri as Tanzi - the police commissioner
- Gino Bramieri as Guidi - Valeria's wooer
- Víctor Ferrari
- Giuseppe Taffarel as Mario Natali - the blind captain
- Sandro Pistolini as Giorgio Monti - Elena's son

== Bibliography ==
- Emiliano Morreale. Così piangevano: il cinema melò nell'Italia degli anni Cinquanta. Donzelli Editore, 2011.
