= The Sinner (1940 film) =

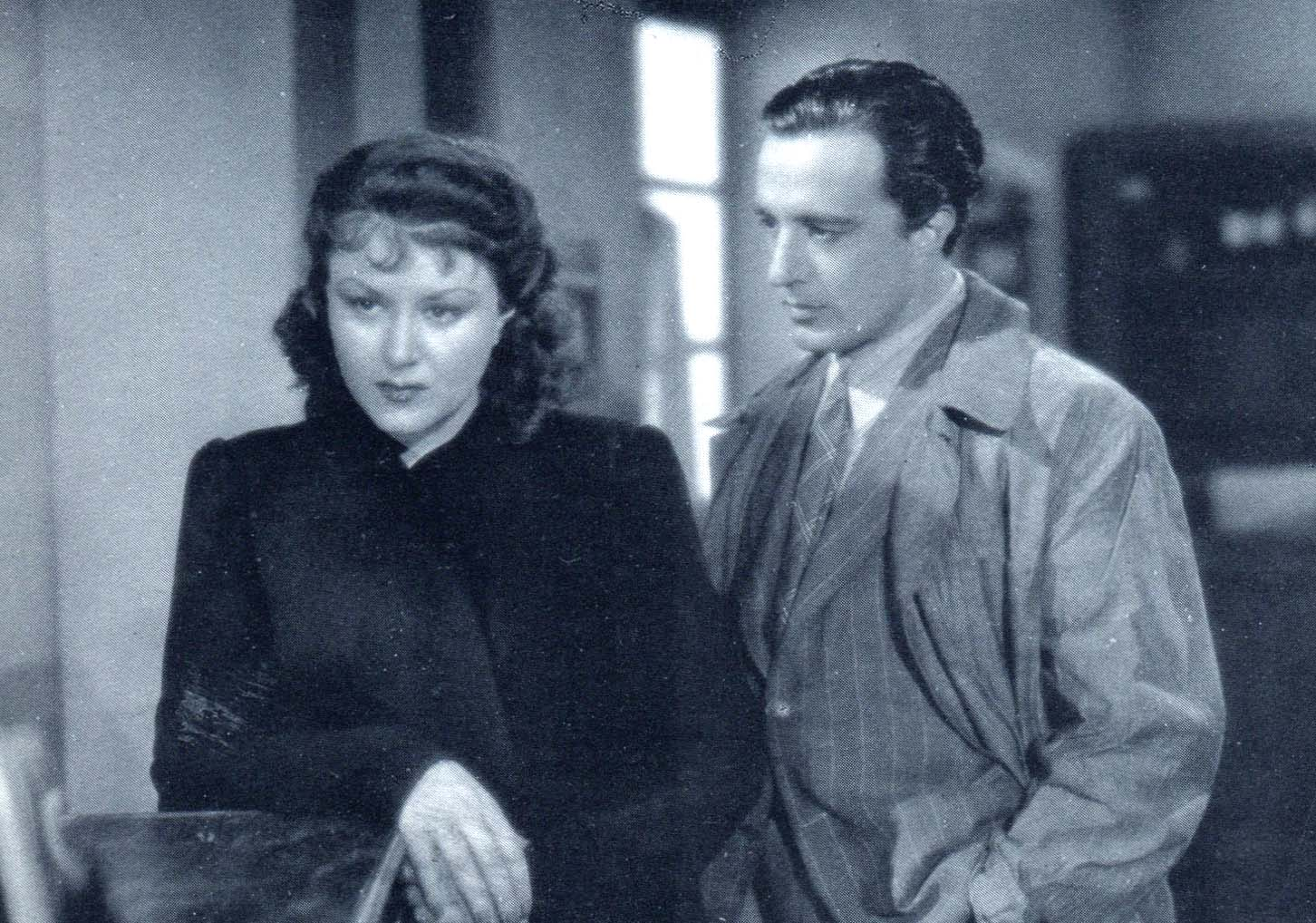
- Barbara and De Sica
- Directed by: Amleto Palermi
- Written by: Amleto Palermi; Luigi Chiarini; Umberto Barbaro; Francesco Pasinetti
- Produced by: Giulio Manenti
- Starring: Paola Barbara; Vittorio De Sica; Fosco Giachetti
- Cinematography: Václav Vích
- Edited by: Vincenzo Zampi
- Music by: Alessandro Cicognini
- Production company: Manenti Film
- Distributed by: Manenti Film
- Release date: 3 September 1940
- Running time: 88 minutes
- Country: Italy
- Language: Italian

The Sinner (Italian: La peccatrice) is a 1940 Italian drama film directed by Amleto Palermi and starring Paola Barbara, Vittorio De Sica, and Fosco Giachetti.

== Cast ==
- Paola Barbara as Maria Ferrante
- Vittorio De Sica as Pietro Bandelli
- Fosco Giachetti as Salvatore, fratello di Adele
- Gino Cervi as Alberto
- Bella Starace Sainati as La madre di Maria
- Umberto Melnati as Paolo
- Camillo Pilotto as Andrea, il padre di Tonino
- Piero Carnabuci as Ottavio
- Giuseppe Porelli as Angelo Bandelli, padre di Pietro
- Mario Ferrari as Nino Bandelli, fratello di Pietro
- Olga Solbelli as Carmela Bandelli, sorella di Pietro
- Marcella Melnati as Zia Gilda
- Anna Maria Falchi as Adele, la madre di Tonino
- Armida Bonocore as Anna
- Anna Capodaglio as Bettina
- Paolo Carlini as Un ballerino nel locale notturno
- Enza Delbi
- Angelo Dessy as Il fattorino dell'albergo
- Attilio Dottesio as Il portiere dell'albergo
- Cesare Fantoni as Un creditore
- Aristide Garbini as Battista
- Dina Perbellini as Ortensia
- Michele Riccardini as Un amico di Paolo e di Piero
- Checco Rissone as Tonio
- Stefano Sibaldi as Un giocatore di dadi
- Marichetta Stoppa

== Bibliography ==
- Gundle, Stephen. Mussolini's Dream Factory: Film Stardom in Fascist Italy. Berghahn Books, 2013.
