= Anything for a Song =

1943 film

- Directed by: Mario Mattoli
- Written by: Leo Catozzo; Mario Mattoli
- Produced by: Gaetano Rizzardi
- Starring: Ferruccio Tagliavini; Vera Carmi; Luisa Rossi
- Cinematography: Charles Suin
- Edited by: Leo Catozzo
- Music by: Giovanni D'Anzi
- Production company: Grandi Film
- Distributed by: Grandi Film
- Release date: 23 December 1943
- Running time: 80 minutes
- Country: Italy
- Language: Italian

Anything for a Song (Italian: Ho tanta voglia di cantare) is a 1943 Italian "white-telephones" musical film directed by Mario Mattoli and starring Ferruccio Tagliavini, Vera Carmi and Luisa Rossi. It was shot at the Palatino Studios in Rome. The film's sets were designed by the art director Piero Filippone.

== Cast ==
- Ferruccio Tagliavini as Il tenore
- Vera Carmi as La fanciulla
- Luisa Rossi as La ragazza cieca
- Carlo Campanini as L'amico del tenore
- Virgilio Riento as L'industriale
- Tino Scotti as Il maestro di musica
- Aldo Silvani as Il padre del tenore
- Luigi Cimara
- Carlo Romano as
- Leopoldo Valentini as
- Mario Siletti as
- Olga Vittoria Gentili as
- Totò Mignone as
- Lia Orlandini as
- Emilio Petacci as

== Bibliography ==
- Roberto Chiti & Roberto Poppi. I film: Tutti i film italiani dal 1930 al 1944. Gremese Editore, 2005.
