= Pina Piovani =

Italian actress

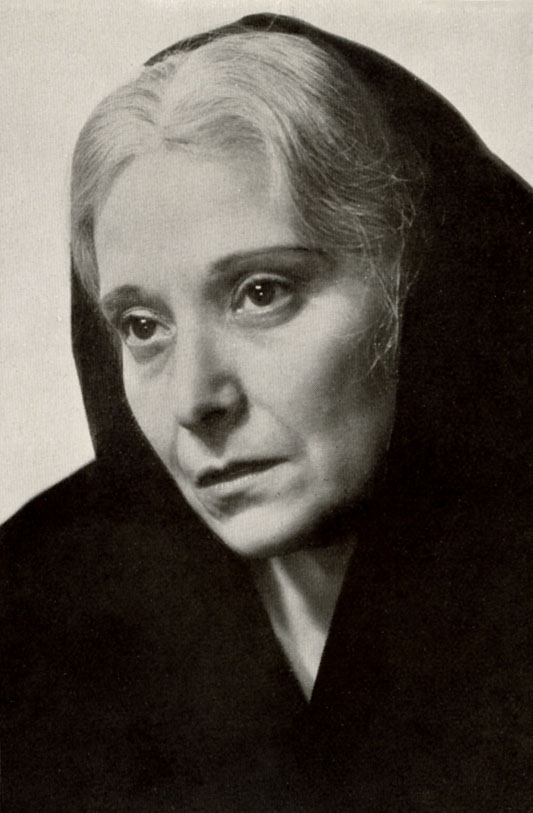
- Pina Piovani in 1953
- Born: 20 March 1897; Rome, Lazio, Italy
- Died: 2 January 1955 (aged 57); Rome, Lazio, Italy
- Occupation: Actress
- Years active: 1928–1955 (film)

Pina Piovani (20 March 1897 – 2 January 1955) was an Italian stage and film actress. She was married to the actor Giulio Battiferri.

== Partial filmography ==
- Napule... e niente cchiù (1928) - Paquita - stella del varietá
- The Pirate's Dream (1940) - Una popolana
- La fanciulla di Portici (1940) - L'ostessa
- La zia smemorata (1940) - La cameriera di Clara
- Tosca (1941) - Angela (uncredited)
- Il signore a doppio petto (1941)
- Se non son matti non li vogliamo (1941) - La padrona della caffetteria
- The Lion of Damascus (1942)
- Street of the Five Moons (1942) - Anna
- Sleeping Beauty (1942) - Nunziata
- Una storia d'amore (1942) - La donna del sussudio
- The Peddler and the Lady (1943) - Una popolana ai mercanti generali (uncredited)
- I'll Always Love You (1943) - Emma, una partoriente (uncredited)
- Gran premio (1944)
- The Innkeeper (1944) - Lucrezia, la cameriera della locanda
- The Gates of Heaven (1945) - La zia del piccolo Claudio (uncredited)
- Two Anonymous Letters (1945) - Un'operaia della tipografia (uncredited)
- Notte di tempesta (1946)
- Last Love (1947) - La madre del tenente
- The White Primrose (1947)
- Fury (1947)
- Fatal Symphony (1947)
- Ritrovarsi (1947)
- L'ebreo errante (1948)
- The Man with the Grey Glove (1948) - Amalia
- City of Pain (1949) - Una esule
- Monaca santa (1949) - Madre Superiora
- The Force of Destiny (1950) - Cameriera di Leonora
- Night Taxi (1950)
- A Dog's Life (1950) - (uncredited)
- Il nido di Falasco (1950)
- Love and Blood (1951)
- Shadows Over Naples (1951)
- Accidents to the Taxes!! (1951) - La guardiana del collegio 'Le Mimose'
- Cameriera bella presenza offresi... (1951) - La signora Marchetti (uncredited)
- Cops and Robbers (1951) - Donata Esposito
- A Thief in Paradise (1952)
- The Adventures of Mandrin (1952)
- In Olden Days (1952) - Lucia (segment "Idillio") (uncredited)
- Papà ti ricordo (1952)
- Non è vero... ma ci credo (1952) - The Clairvoyant
- Il tallone di Achille (1952) - Madre della Bambina
- Er fattaccio (1952) - Sora Emma
- Carne inquieta (1952)
- Jolanda la figlia del corsaro nero (1953) - Madre superiore
- Lulu (1953) - Mrs. Salvi
- Voice of Silence (1953) - Teresa Fabiani
- One of Those (1953)
- Naples Sings (1953) - Donna Carmela
- In amore si pecca in due (1954)
- Angels of Darkness (1954)
- Of Life and Love (1954)
- Woman of Rome (1954) - Madre di Adriana
- Prima di sera (1954) - Bancani's Mother-in-law
- Ho ritrovato mio figlio (1954) - La perpetua
- If You Won a Hundred Million (1954) - Portiera (segment "Il pensionato")
- Loving You Is My Sin (1954) - The Mother Superior
- It Takes Two to Sin in Love (1954)
- Gli orizzonti del sole (1955) - (final film role)

== Bibliography ==
- Ennio Bìspuri. Totò: principe clown : tutti i film di Totò. Guida Editori, 1997.
