= Michele Riccardini =

Italian film actor

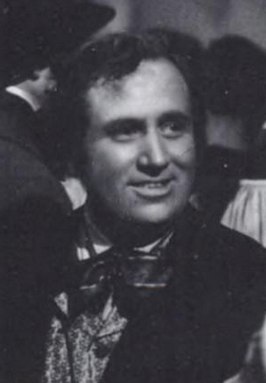
- Riccardini in Street of the Five Moons (1942)
- Born: Michele Riccardini; 2 October 1910; Perugia, Umbria, Italy
- Died: 24 July 1978 (aged 67); Merate, Lombardy, Italy
- Occupation: Actor
- Years active: 1935–1973 (film)

Michele Riccardini (2 October 1910 – 24 July 1978) was an Italian film actor. He appeared in around fifty films during his career as well as several television episodes. In 1943 he played the role of Don Remigio in Luchino Visconti's Ossessione.

== Partial filmography ==
- Like the Leaves (1935) - Il Bronzino
- Come le foglie (1938) - Bernabei
- Retroscena (1939) - (uncredited)
- Dora Nelson (1939) - Sor Mario
- Manon Lescaut (1940)
- The Sinner (1940) - Un amico di Paolo e di Piero (uncredited)
- Idyll in Budapest (1941)
- La compagnia della teppa (1941) - Rossini
- Pia de' Tolomei (1941) - Baldo
- Se non son matti non li vogliamo (1941) - Un altro membro dei "Matti"
- L'amore canta (1941) - (uncredited)
- Giarabub (1942) - Il cuoco
- Street of the Five Moons (1942) - Michele
- Violette nei capelli (1942) - Il tirchio amico di Giuliano
- La fabbrica dell'imprevisto (1942) - Il regista
- I due Foscari (1942) - L'ubriaco nella taverna
- The Champion (1943) - Federico
- Ossessione (1943) - Don Remigio
- The Ways of Sin (1946) - Il sacerdote
- The Great Dawn (1947) - Don Terenzio
- Tragic Hunt (1947) - Il maresciallo
- Lost Youth (1948) - Sor Giuseppe (uncredited)
- Mad About Opera (1948) - L'altro amico scrocone di Scala
- D'homme à hommes (1948)
- The Walls of Malapaga (1949) - Le patron du restaurant / Il padrone dell'osteria (uncredited)
- Una voce nel tuo cuore (1949) - Enrico
- No Peace Under the Olive Tree (1950) - Il maresciallo
- Il sentiero dell'odio (1950)
- Double Cross (1951) - Signor Biagni
- Les miracles n'ont lieu qu'une fois (1951) - (uncredited)
- Viva il cinema! (1952)
- Rome 11:00 (1952)
- The Blind Woman of Sorrento (1953) - Un congiurato
- Carmen proibita (1953)
- Cavallina storna (1953) - Il sig. Francesco
- Gran Varietà (1954) - il banchiere Teresky (episodio 'Fregoli')
- Theodora, Slave Empress (1954) - Il carceriere (uncredited)
- Ulysses (1954) - Leodes
- An American in Rome (1954) - Cameriere del ristorante (uncredited)
- La tua donna (1954)
- The Miller's Beautiful Wife (1955) - Avvocato
- Vacanze a Ischia (1957) - Avvocato Lojacono
- Le bellissime gambe di Sabrina (1958) - Ragioniere
- L'inferno addosso (1959)
- Adua and Her Friends (1960) - The Yielding Customer in the Trattoria (uncredited)
- Crimen (1960) - Luciano (uncredited)
- Ghosts of Rome (1961) - Antonio - sarto e portiere
- The Joy of Living (1961) - Greengrocer

== Bibliography ==
- Bacon, Henry. Visconti: Explorations of Beauty and Decay. Cambridge University Press, 1998.
