= Night Taxi =

1950 film directed by Carmine Gallone

- Directed by: Carmine Gallone
- Written by: Bruno D'Agostini; Aldo De Benedetti
- Produced by: Carmine Gallone
- Starring: Beniamino Gigli; Danielle Godet; Philippe Lemaire
- Cinematography: Aldo Giordani
- Edited by: Niccolò Lazzari
- Music by: Dan Caslar
- Production company: Società Italiana Cines
- Release date: 10 September 1950
- Running time: 88 minutes
- Countries: France; Italy
- Language: Italian

Night Taxi (French: Taxi de nuit, Italian: Taxi di notte) is a 1950 French-Italian comedy film about a taxicab driver, directed by Carmine Gallone and starring Beniamino Gigli, Danielle Godet and Philippe Lemaire.

== Synopsis ==
After finding a baby left abandoned in his cab, a singing taxi driver tries to find its mother.

== Cast ==
- Beniamino Gigli as Nello Spadoni
- Danielle Godet as Laura Morani
- Philippe Lemaire as Alberto Franchi
- Virginia Belmont as Luisa Forenti
- Carlo Ninchi as Forenti l'Industriale
- William Tubbs as Mr. William Simon
- Jone Morino as Signora Forenti
- Aroldo Tieri as Conte Tattini
- Giuseppe Varni as Major Domo
- Giuseppe Rinaldi as Il ragionere, inamorato di Luisa
- Renzo De Luca as Il piccolo abandonato in taxi
- Giulio Battiferri
- Franco Coop
- Peppino Spadaro
- Edda Soligo
- Ciro Berardi
- Gustavo Serena
- Nico Pepe
- Pina Piovani

== Bibliography ==
- Aprà, Adriano. The Fabulous Thirties: Italian cinema 1929-1944. Electa International, 1979.
