= Leo Catozzo =

Italian film editor (1912–1997)

- Born: Leo Cattozzo; 10 December 1912; Adria, Rovigo, Kingdom of Italy
- Died: 4 March 1997 (aged 84); Santa Severa, Rome, Italy

Leo Catozzo (10 December 1912 – 4 March 1997) was an Italian award-winning film editor. He was born as Leo Cattozzo - the second "t" in his name was "lost" during his marriage ceremony due to an error by the registrar. He is best known as the designer and manufacturer of the self-perforating adhesive tape film splicer known as CIR-Catozzo ("Costruzione Incollatrici Rapide").

== Life and career ==
Born in Adria, Province of Rovigo, the son of the musician Nino, Catozzo graduated in law, then in cello at the Benedetto Marcello Conservatory in Venice, and finally in set design and directing at the Centro Sperimentale di Cinematografia in Rome. He entered the film industry in the early 1940s as a screenwriter and later assistant director for several of Mario Mattoli's comedy films.

Catozzo debuted as a film editor in the 1940s, mostly working with Mario Mattoli, and later worked with Alberto Lattuada, Mario Soldati and especially Federico Fellini whose films he edited during the fifties and sixties, most notably La Dolce Vita and 8½. 8½ was listed as the 41st best-edited film of all time in a 2012 survey of members of the Motion Picture Editors Guild. In 1956 Catozzo received the American Cinema Editors Award for King Vidor's War and Peace.

Being allergic to acetone, Catozzo projected and developed an innovative film splicer, later known as "CIR-Catozzo", "Pressa Catozzo" or just "Catozzo", using it for the first time in Fellini's Nights of Cabiria. The insistent demands of his colleagues forced him first to fabricate a hundred copies and later, to patent the machine which launched, in the early sixties, the mass production of the film splicer, something that gradually drew him away from his activity as an editor. In 1989 he received the Academy Scientific and Technical Award for his creation.

== Selected filmography ==
- Sealed Lips (1942)
- A Little Wife (1943)
- Anything for a Song (1943)
- Toto Seeks Peace (1954)
- Nights of Cabiria (1959) - also as actor
- 8½ (1963).
