= Woman of Rome =

1954 film

- Film poster
- Directed by: Luigi Zampa
- Written by: Giorgio Bassani; Ennio Flaiano; Alberto Moravia; Luigi Zampa
- Produced by: Dino De Laurentiis; Carlo Ponti
- Starring: Gina Lollobrigida
- Cinematography: Enzo Serafin
- Edited by: Eraldo Da Roma
- Music by: Enzo Masetti
- Release date: 27 October 1954
- Running time: 90 minutes
- Country: Italy
- Language: Italian

Woman of Rome (Italian: La romana) is a 1954 drama film directed by Luigi Zampa, and starring Gina Lollobrigida.

== Plot ==
Beautiful but poor Adriana, during the fascist era, finds work as a model for a painter. She becomes the lover of a chauffeur who promises to marry her, but then is revealed to be already married. She improvises herself as a prostitute and then falls in love with Mino, a good guy who ends up in jail for anti-fascist activities. Thus Adriana's misadventures in search of love continue.

== Cast ==
- Gina Lollobrigida as Adriana
- Daniel Gélin as Mino
- Franco Fabrizi as Gino
- Raymond Pellegrin as Astarita
- Pina Piovani as Madre di Adriana
- Xenia Valderi as Gisella
- Renato Tontini as Carlo Sonzogno
- Gino Buzzanca as Riccardo
- Mariano Bottino as Tommaso
- Giuseppe Addobbati as Tullio
- Giovanni Di Benedetto as Il pittore (as Gianni Di Benedetto)
- Riccardo Garrone as Giancarlo
