= Dina Sassoli =

Italian film actress (1920–2008)

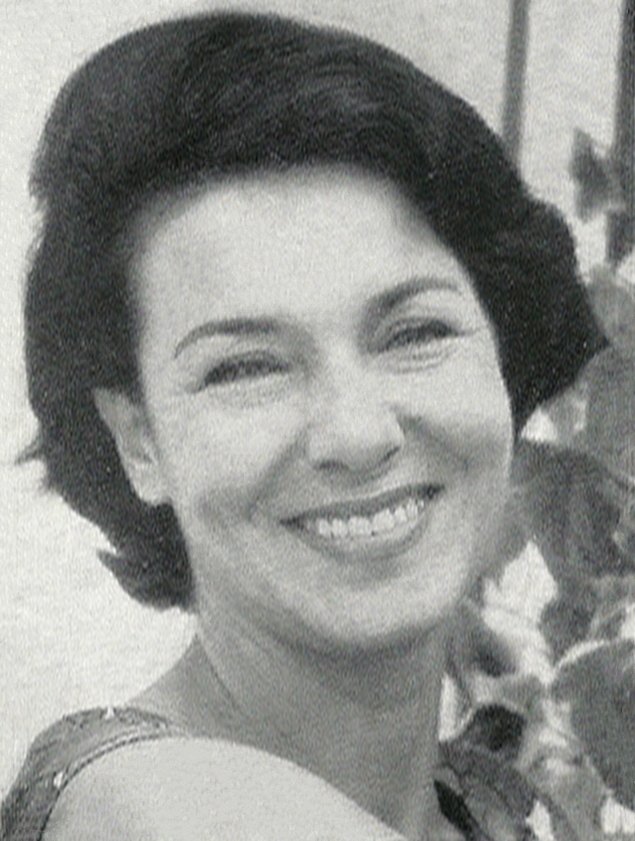
- Born: 15 August 1920; Rimini
- Died: 24 March 2008 (aged 87); Rome
- Occupation: Actress

Dina Sassoli (15 August 1920 – 24 March 2008) was an Italian film actress. She was born on 15 August 1920, in Rimini, Emilia-Romagna, Italy. She was best known for her work with Italian director Mario Camerini. She died on 24 March 2008 in Rome, Italy.

== Selected filmography ==
- Kean (1940)
- The Betrothed (1941)
- Captain Tempest (1942)
- The Lion of Damascus (1942)
- Two Anonymous Letters (1945)
- No Turning Back (1945)
- Un giorno nella vita (1946)
- The Mill on the Po (1949)
- Little Lady (1949)
- Flying Squadron (1949)
- Cameriera bella presenza offresi... (1951)
- The Last Sentence (1951)
- I figli non si vendono (1952)
- The Other Side of Paradise (1953)
- And Agnes Chose to Die (1976)
- Oggetti smarriti (1980)
- Eugenio (1980)
