= Tragic Night =

1942 film

- Directed by: Mario Soldati
- Written by: Mario Bonfantini; Emilio Cecchi; Enzo Giachino; Lucio De Caro; Mario Soldati
- Based on: La trappola by Delfino Cinelli
- Starring: Doris Duranti; Carlo Ninchi; Andrea Checchi; Juan de Landa
- Cinematography: Otello Martelli; Massimo Terzano
- Edited by: Marcella Benvenuti
- Music by: Giuseppe Rosati
- Production company: Scalera Film
- Distributed by: Scalera Film
- Release date: 20 March 1942
- Running time: 80 minutes
- Country: Italy
- Language: Italian

Tragic Night (Italian: Tragica notte) is a 1942 Italian drama film directed by Mario Soldati and starring Doris Duranti, Carlo Ninchi and Andrea Checchi. It is based on a 1928 novel La trappola by Delfino Cinelli. After being released from prison, a poacher seeks revenge on the gamekeeper who put him there. It was made at the Scalera Studios in Rome. It belongs to the movies of the calligrafismo style.

== Synopsis ==
One day in the countryside the gamekeeper Stefano is ambushed and beaten by a group of vigilantes led by Nanni, who take revenge on him for enforcing the poaching laws on the young Count's land and sending him to prison in Florence. Stefano turns up soon afterwards at the shop owned by Nanni and although he is aware who attacked him he pretends it had been accident. However he nurses a secret grudge.

Two years later, much time has passed and Stefano pretends to be friendly towards Nanni. He notices that he is particularly sensitive about his wife, Armida, a woman from Florence who he had married just before he had been sent to prison. His chance comes when the count returns to his estate after two years in America. Stefano hints to Nanni about a secret relationship between the Count and his wife, based on a brief attempt by the count to flirt with Armida two years earlier, before he realised she was married.

Despite the fact that they had been childhood friends, Stefano manages to persuade Nanni that the Count is betraying him. Stoking his jealousy, he lures him out one night to a hunt for badgers, promising that the count has invited him. Instead Sefano tries to ambush him in revenge for his humiliation two years before, but Nanni is too quick and shoots him dead. The Count, at last realising what is happening, arrives on the scene. Nanni aims his gun at him, but the Count reminds him of their childhood bond. It is clear to Nanni that he had no ulterior motives towards his wife and he lowers his gun. When the other villagers arrives, the Count takes the blame for the shooting, claiming it was an accident on his part.

== Main cast ==
- Doris Duranti as Armida
- Carlo Ninchi as Stefano
- Andrea Checchi as Nanni
- Juan de Landa as Faille
- Amelia Chellini as Zelinda, la madre di Armida
- Adriano Rimoldi as Il conte Paolo Martorelli
- Giulio Battiferri as Gino

== Bibliography ==
- Brunetta, Gian Piero. The History of Italian Cinema: A Guide to Italian Film from Its Origins to the Twenty-first Century. Princeton University Press, 2009.
