= Andrea Checchi =

Italian actor (1916–1974)

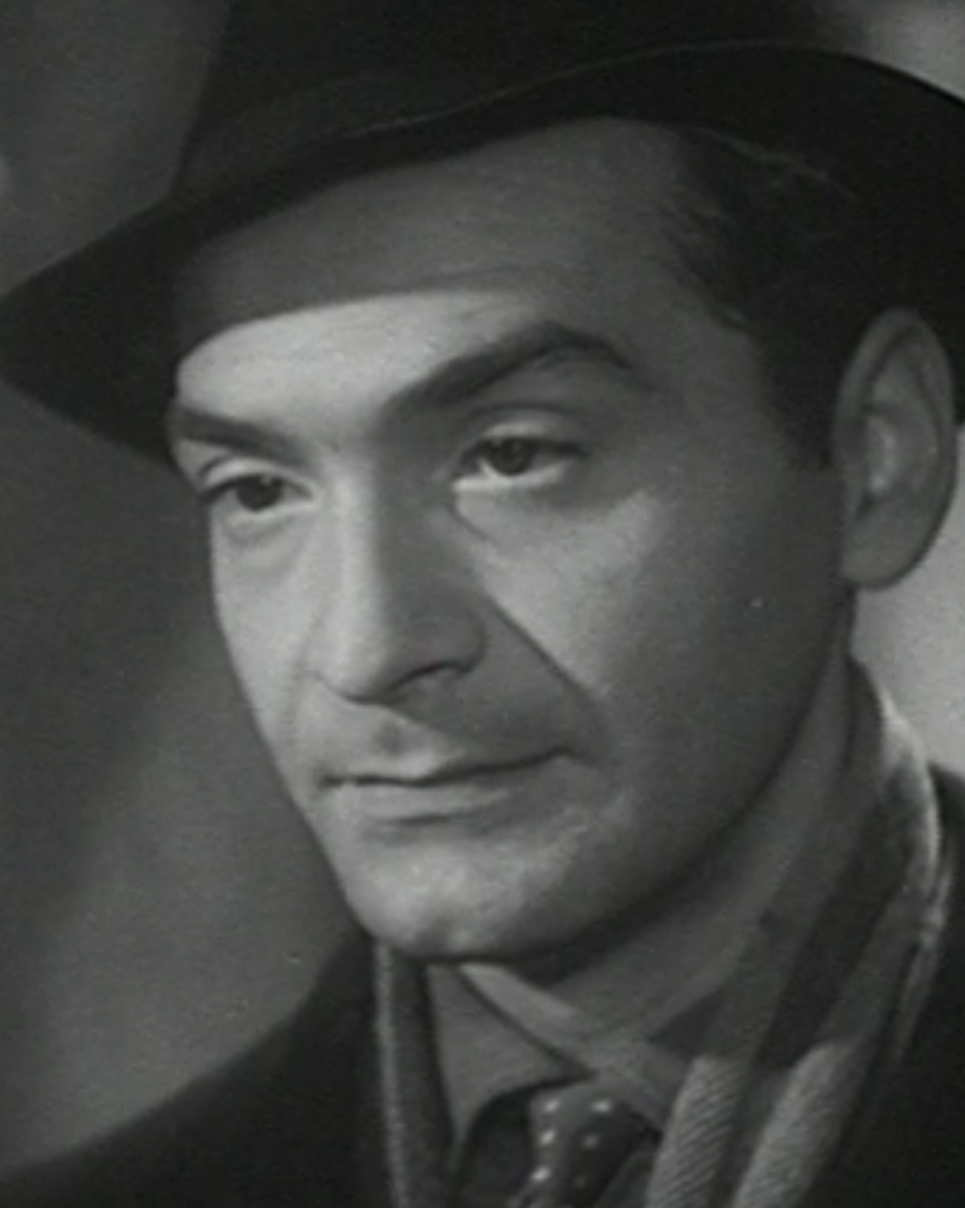
- Checchi in 1946
- Born: 21 October 1916; Florence, Kingdom of Italy
- Died: 29 March 1974 (aged 57); Rome, Italy
- Education: Accademia di Belle Arti di Firenze; Centro Sperimentale di Cinematografia
- Occupation: Actor
- Years active: 1934–1974
- Height: 1.74 m (5 ft 9 in)

Andrea Checchi (21 October 1916 – 29 March 1974) was an Italian actor, who appeared in over 180 film and television roles between 1934 and 1977. He won two Nastro d'Argento Awards during his career, Best Actor for Two Anonymous Letters (1945) and Best Supporting Actor for Parola di ladro (1957).

== Early life and education ==
Chechhi was born in Florence, the son of painter Amedeo Checchi. He studied painting at the Accademia di Belle Arti di Firenze. He moved to Rome to attend the Centro Sperimentale di Cinematografia, studied acting under Alessandro Blasetti. Blasetti cast Checchi in his first film in 1934, with a minor part in the historical drama 1860.

== Career ==
After graduating, he had his first significant role of weight in the 1940 historical drama film L'assedio dell'Alcazar by Augusto Genina. He later appeared in Mario Camerini's Due lettere anonime (for which he received a Nastro d'Argento for Best Actor), Giuseppe De Santis's Tragic Hunt (1947), Michelangelo Antonioni's La signora senza camelie (1953), Vittorio De Sica's Two Women (1960), and Mario Bava's Black Sunday (1960), among many other films. In 1958, he won the Nastro d'Argento for Best Supporting Actor for his performance in the film Parola di ladro (1957).

Beginning in the 1960s, he appeared increasingly on television, starring in RAI teleplays based on An American Tragedy, The Captain's Daughter, Resurrection, Vanity Fair, and The Moonstone. In 1971, he starred with Giancarlo Giannini in E le stelle stanno a guardare, an adaptation of A. J. Cronin's The Stars Look Down.

== Personal life ==
Checchi was married to Hungarian-born Erika Schwarze, with whom he had a son, Enrico Roberto Checchi, a television set designer. In addition to acting, Checchi was also an avid painter.

=== Death ===
Later in life, Checchi was diagnosed with polyarteritis nodosa, traveling intermittently to Geneva for treatment. He died at a hospital in Rome on 29 March 1974, at the age of 57.

== Selected filmography ==
- 1860 (1934) - Another soldier
- Everybody's Woman (1934) - Un amico di Roberto
- The Old Guard (1934) - Pompeo (uncredited)
- Stadium (1934)
- The Last of the Bergeracs (1934)
- The Conquest of the Air (1936) - Zoroastro (uncredited)
- Amore (1936) - Lorenzo
- Bayonet (1936) - attendente del duca
- Luciano Serra, Pilot (1938) - Ten. Binelli
- L'ultima carta (1938) - Carlo Revers
- Under the Southern Cross (1938) - Un'operaio della piantagione
- Ettore Fieramosca (1938) - Gentilino
- La grande luce - Montevergine (1939) - Alberto
- Department Store (1939) - Maurizio
- Piccolo hotel (1939) - Andrea Toth
- The Night of Tricks (1939) - Giorgio Albini
- La conquista dell'aria (1939) - Zoroastro
- Manon Lescaut (1940) - Marius
- È sbarcato un marinaio (1940) - Un cavallerizzo al Luna Park
- Giù il sipario (1940) - Il giovane commediografo
- Incanto di mezzanotte (1940) - Il conte Abbiati
- L'assedio dell'Alcazar (1940) - Perro
- Amiamoci così (1940) - Biagio
- La leggenda azzurra (1940) - Il giovane ricco
- Senza cielo (1940) - Piero Franci
- I pirati del golfo (1940)
- The King of England Will Not Pay (1941) - Ippolito Buondelmonti
- Ragazza che dorme (1941) - Gianni
- Schoolgirl Diary (1941) - Il professore Marini
- Thrill (1941) - Mattia Cintra
- Solitudine (1941) - Guido Navarri
- Tragic Night (1942) - Nanni
- Invisible Chains (1942) - Enrico Leni, il fratellastro
- Before the Postman (1942) - Bruno Bellini
- Street of the Five Moons (1942) - Checco
- M.A.S. (1942) - Oscar
- The Countess of Castiglione (1942) - Baldo Princivalli
- Sealed Lips (1942) - Carlo Massani
- Malombra (1942) - Corrado Silla
- Giacomo the Idealist (1943) - Giacinto Magnenzio
- Tempesta sul golfo (1943) - Il capitano Roberto Capece
- The Valley of the Devil (1943) - Il tenente medico Peter Grundel
- Sad Loves (1943) - Fabrizio Arcieri
- Tutta la vita in ventiquattr'ore (1943) - Giulio
- Lacrime di sangue (1944) - Roberto
- Vivere ancora (1945)
- The Ten Commandments (1945) - (segment "Non nominare il nome di Dio invano")
- Lettere al sottotenente (1945) - Il giovane sottotenente
- Two Anonymous Letters (1945) - Bruno
- The Ways of Sin (1946) - Rocco
- Rome, Free City (1946) - Il giovane
- A Yank in Rome (1946) - Roberto
- Hotel Luna, Room 34 (1946) - Andrea Esposito
- Biraghin (1946) - Claudio Aroldi
- Crime News (1947)
- Last Love (1947) - Il capitano Rastelli
- The White Primrose (1947) - Il Poliziotto
- Tragic Hunt (1947) - Alberto
- The Brothers Karamazov (1947) - Ivàn Karamazoff
- Eleonora Duse (1947) - Tebaldo Checchi
- Crossroads of Passion (1948)
- The Earth Cries Out (1949) - Ariè
- The Walls of Malapaga (1949) - Giuseppe, le mari de Marta / Giuseppe, marito di Marta
- Flying Squadron (1949)
- Paolo e Francesca (1950) - Gianciotto Malatesta
- Il cielo è rosso (1950)
- The Accusation (1950) - Il commissario Costantini
- Il sentiero dell'odio (1950)
- The Black Captain (1951) - Fratello Di Marco e Lucrezia
- Love and Blood (1951)
- Schatten über Neapel (1951)
- Attention! Bandits! (1951) - The engineer
- Stormbound (1951) - Rol
- I'm the Hero (1952) - Busatti
- In Olden Days (1952) - Camillo (segment "Meno di un giorno")
- Don Lorenzo (1952) - Carlo
- The Lady Without Camelias (1953)
- If You Won a Hundred Million (1953) - (segment "Il pensionato")
- The Captain of Venice (1951) - Ezzelino da Romano
- Mid-Century Loves (1954) - Gabriele (segment "Girandola 1910")
- A Slice of Life (1954) - Carlo (segment "Gli innamorati")
- Pietà per chi cade (1954) - Andrea Mari
- Appassionatamente (1954) - Antonio
- House of Ricordi (1954) - Giulio Ricordi
- The Two Orphans (1954) - Captain Marrest
- Human Torpedoes (1954) - Giorgio
- Tripoli, Beautiful Land of Love (1954) - Captain Andressi
- Red and Black (1954)
- La campana di San Giusto (1954) - Roberto
- Goodbye Naples (1955) - Frank
- Buonanotte... avvocato! (1955) - Franco, Husband of Bianca Maria
- Rommel's Treasure (1955) - Krikorian
- I quattro del getto tonante (1955) - Cap. Rovi
- Processo all'amore (1955) - Andrea Solari
- Desperate Farewell (1955) - Dott. Maurizio Marini
- The Intruder (1956) - Alberto Serpieri
- I giorni più belli (1956) - Uno degli ex alunni
- Supreme Confession (1956) - Don Diego Garletto
- Operazione notte (1957)
- Terrore sulla città (1957)
- Parola di ladro (1957) - Gabriele Bertinori
- Mattino di primavera (1957) - padre di Marisa
- My Wife's Enemy (1959) - Dr. Giuliani
- Le cameriere (1959) - L'avvocato Arnaldo Guglielmi
- World of Miracles (1959) - Il direttore della fotografia
- Goliath and the Barbarians (1959) - Delfo
- Le notti dei Teddy Boys (1959) - Kommissar
- The Employee (1960) - Francesco Somma
- I piaceri dello scapolo (1960) - Ing. Rocchetti
- Black Sunday (1960) - Dr. Choma Kruvajan / Dr. Thomas Kruvajan
- Long Night in 1943 (1960) - Il farmacista
- The Thousand Eyes of Dr. Mabuse (1960) - Hoteldetektiv Berg
- Two Women (1960) - Un fascista
- Blood Feud (1961)
- The Assassin (1961) - Morello
- Akiko (1961) - Sor Egisto
- Don Camillo: Monsignor (1961) - L'esponente comunista di Roma
- Cronache del '22 (1961)
- Gold of Rome (1961) - Ortona, Giulia's father
- Erik the Conqueror (1961) - Sir Rutford
- Caccia all'uomo (1961) - Inzirillo
- Ultimatum alla vita (1962) - Un fascista
- Ten Italians for One German (1962) - Professor Marcello Rossi
- Colpo gobbo all'italiana (1962) - Orazio Menicotti
- Il sangue e la sfida (1962)
- Night Train to Milan (1962) - De Simone
- Lo smemorato di Collegno (1962) - Avvocato Rossetti
- Imperial Venus (1962) - Doctor
- Il mio amico Benito (1962) - Il commissario
- The Verona Trial (1963) - Dino Grandi
- Torpedo Bay (1963) - Micheluzzi
- Roma contro Roma (1964)
- Attack and Retreat (1964) - Colonel Sermonti
- La costanza della ragione (1964) - Lori's Father
- Super rapina a Milano (1964) - commissario Marascalco
- La vendetta dei gladiatori (1964) - Gavinio
- I Kill, You Kill (1965) - Antonio (segment "Giochi acerbi")
- Challenge of the Gladiator (1965)
- I soldi (1965)
- Made in Italy (1965) - Her Husband (segment "5 'La Famiglia', episode 3")
- Me, Me, Me... and the Others (1965) - Praying Man
- Il nero (1966)
- A Bullet for the General (1967) - Don Felipe
- The Seven Cervi Brothers (1968) - the Communist Party member
- Bloody Che Contra (1969) - Selnich
- Cerca di capirmi (1970)
- Waterloo (1970) - Sauret
- Un apprezzato professionista di sicuro avvenire (1972) - Vincenzo's father
- Baciamo le mani (1973)
- Una donna per 7 bastardi (1974) - Old Man
