= List of Lithuanian actors =

This is a list of Lithuanian actors of film, television and theatre who originated from Lithuania.

== A ==
- Regimantas Adomaitis (1937–2022)

== B ==
- Unė Babickaitė (1897–1961)
- Donatas Banionis (1924–2014)
- Artūras Barysas (1954–2005)
- Vytautas Pranas Bičiūnas (1893–1943)
- Cornell Borchers (1925–2014)
- Lina Braknytė (born 1952)
- Juozas Budraitis (born 1940)

== D ==
- Ingeborga Dapkūnaitė (born 1963)
- Agnia Ditkovskyte (born 1988)

== J ==
- Inga Jankauskaitė (born 1981)
- Jurgita Jurkutė (born 1985)

== K ==
- Rolandas Kazlas (born 1969)
- Vytautas Kernagis (1951–2008)

== L ==
Ruta Lee (born Ruta Mary Kilmonis; 1935)

== M ==
- Andrius Mamontovas (born 1967)
- Algimantas Masiulis (1931–2008)
- Aurelija Mikušauskaitė (1937–1974)
- Juozas Miltinis (1907–1994)
- Saulius Mykolaitis (1966–2006)

== O ==
- Kristina Orbakaite (born 1971)
- Nijolė Oželytė-Vaitiekūnienė (born 1954)

== R ==
- Živilė Raudonienė (born 1982)

== S ==
- Vytautas Šapranauskas (1958–2013)
- Jacques Sernas (1925–2015)
- Antanas Škėma (1910–1961)

== V ==
- Rimantė Valiukaitė (born 1970)
- Adolfas Večerskis (born 1949)
- Bria Vinaite (born Barbora Bulvinaitė in 1993)

== See also ==
- List of Lithuanians
