= The White Primrose =

1947 film

- Directed by: Carlo Ludovico Bragaglia
- Written by: Aldo De Benedetti; Anton Giulio Majano; Guglielmo Morandi
- Produced by: Carlo Ponti
- Starring: Carlo Campanini; Carlo Ninchi; Andrea Checchi
- Cinematography: Carlo Montuori
- Edited by: Jolanda Benvenuti
- Music by: Mario Labroca
- Production company: Lux Film
- Distributed by: Lux Film
- Release date: 18 April 1947
- Running time: 85 minutes
- Country: Italy
- Language: Italian

The White Primrose (Italian: La primula bianca) is a 1947 Italian comedy film directed by Carlo Ludovico Bragaglia and starring Carlo Campanini, Carlo Ninchi and Andrea Checchi.

== Cast ==
- Carlo Campanini as Felice Moretti
- Carlo Ninchi as Capo Banda
- Andrea Checchi as Il Poliziotto
- Laura Gore as Amica del Capo Banda
- Manlio Busoni as Ispettore di Polizia
- Paolo Monelli as Direttore del Giornale
- Mirella Monti as Figlia del Capobanda
- Giulio Calì as Barista
- Angelo Calabrese
- Giulio Battiferri
- Max Lancia
- Folco Lulli
- Nino Pavese
- Pina Piovani

== Bibliography ==
- Gundle, Stephen. Fame Amid the Ruins: Italian Film Stardom in the Age of Neorealism. Berghahn Books, 2019.
