= The Canal of the Angels =

1934 films

- Directed by: Francesco Pasinetti
- Written by: Francesco Pasinetti
- Starring: Maurizio D'Ancora; Anna Ariani; Ugo Gracci
- Production company: Venezia Film
- Release date: 1934
- Country: Italy
- Language: Italian

The Canal of the Angels (Italian: Il canale degli angeli) is a 1934 Italian drama film directed by Francesco Pasinetti and starring Maurizio D'Ancora, Anna Ariani and Ugo Gracci. The film is shot in semi-documentary style. In a poor neighborhood of Venice, a young boy becomes aware of his mother's adultery.

Along with a number of other films of the 1930s, it has elements which are a precursor to the emergence of Italian neorealism in the mid-1940s.

== Cast ==
- Maurizio D'Ancora as Il 'Capitano'
- Anna Ariani as Anna
- Ugo Gracci as Daniele
- Nina Simonetti as Gina
- Aldo Rinaldi as Aldo
- Pino Locchi as The Child
- Mara Dussia
- Otello Toso

== Bibliography ==
- Brunetta, Gian Piero. The History of Italian Cinema: A Guide to Italian Film from Its Origins to the Twenty-first Century. Princeton University Press, 2009.
