= Two Anonymous Letters =

- DVD cover
- Directed by: Mario Camerini
- Screenplay by: Mario Camerini; Carlo Musso; Nino Novarese; Ivo Perilli; Turi Vasile
- Story by: Ivo Perilli
- Produced by: Carlo Ponti
- Cinematography: Massimo Terzano
- Music by: Alessandro Cicognini
- Release date: 3 November 1945
- Country: Italy
- Language: Italian

Due lettere anonime, internationally released as Two Anonymous Letters, is a 1945 Italian war-melodrama film directed by Mario Camerini.

For this film Andrea Checchi won a Silver Ribbon for Best Actor.

== Cast ==
- Clara Calamai: Gina
- Andrea Checchi: Bruno
- Otello Toso: Tullio
- Carlo Ninchi: Rossini
- Dina Sassoli: Giulia
- Giovanna Scotto: Maria, la madre di Bruno
- Arnaldo Martelli: cavalier Ernesto Pacetti
- Stefano Fossari: tenente
- Heinrich Bode: sergente Karl
- Vittorio Duse: Ettore
- Pina Piovani: operaia della tipografia
