= Giacomo the Idealist =

1943 film

- Directed by: Alberto Lattuada
- Written by: Aldo Buzzi; Emilio Cecchi; Alberto Lattuada
- Based on: Giacomo the Idealist by Emilio De Marchi
- Produced by: Carlo Ponti
- Starring: Massimo Serato; Marina Berti; Andrea Checchi
- Cinematography: Carlo Nebiolo
- Edited by: Mario Bonotti
- Music by: Felice Lattuada
- Production company: Artisti Tecnici Associati
- Distributed by: Artisti Associati
- Release date: 1 February 1943
- Running time: 90 minutes
- Country: Italy
- Language: Italian

Giacomo the Idealist (Italian: Giacomo l'idealista) is a 1943 Italian historical drama film directed by Alberto Lattuada and starring Massimo Serato, Marina Berti and Andrea Checchi. It represents the directorial debut of Lattuada.

It is based on the novel with the same name by Emilio De Marchi. It was shot at the Fert Studios in Turin with sets designed by the art director Fulvio Jacchia. It belongs to the movies of the calligrafismo style.

== Cast ==
- Massimo Serato as Giacomo Lanzavecchia
- Marina Berti as Celestina
- Andrea Checchi as Giacinto Magnenzio
- Tina Lattanzi as Countess Cristina Magnenzio
- Armando Migliari as Mr. Mangano
- Giacinto Molteni as Count Magnenzio
- Giulio Tempesti as Don Lorenzo
- Attilio Dottesio as Battistella Lanzavecchia
- Domenico Viglione Borghese as Il padre di Giacomo
- Silvia Leandri as Lisa, sorella di Giacomo

== Bibliography ==
- Moliterno, Gino. Historical Dictionary of Italian Cinema. Scarecrow Press, 2008.
