= Redemption (1952 film) =

1952 film

- Directed by: Piero Caserini
- Written by: Luigi Bonelli; Decio Fittaioli
- Produced by: Ilio Lomi
- Starring: Luisa Rossi; Marco Vicario; Juan de Landa.
- Cinematography: Carlo Fiore
- Edited by: Cesare Carlesi
- Music by: Cesare Caserini
- Production company: Ideal Film
- Distributed by: Movietime
- Release date: 1952
- Running time: 83 minutes
- Country: Italy
- Language: Italian

Redemption (Italian: Redenzione) is a 1952 Italian melodrama film directed by Piero Caserini and starring Luisa Rossi, Marco Vicario and Juan de Landa. The film's sets were designed by the art director Ivo Battelli.

== Plot ==
The young shepherdess Nicuzza is seduced and abandoned by a young count: the girl becomes pregnant with her but the count does not intend to recognize the child. Nicuzza decides to take revenge and she kills the count on the day of her marriage to another noblewoman. Nicuzza is imprisoned and gives birth to a child who immediately shows problems with her sight.

== Cast ==
- Luisa Rossi as Nicuzza
- Marco Vicario as Barone Paolo Di San Lario
- Juan de Landa as Parroco
- Enrico Olivieri as Figlio Di Nicuzza
- Laura Tiberti
- Paolo Iacopozzi as Piero
- Peter Trent
- Giuseppe Corradi
- Clara Paoloni
- Arrigo Basevi
- Margherita Bambini

== Bibliography ==
- Chiti, Roberto & Poppi, Roberto. Dizionario del cinema italiano: Dal 1945 al 1959. Gremese Editore, 1991.
