= The Priest's Hat (film) =

- Directed by: Ferdinando Maria Poggioli
- Written by: Sergio Amidei; Giacomo De Benedetti
- Based on: The Priest's Hat by Emilio De Marchi
- Produced by: Sandro Ghenzi
- Starring: Roldano Lupi; Lída Baarová; Luigi Almirante
- Cinematography: Arturo Gallea
- Edited by: Mario Serandrei
- Music by: Enzo Masetti
- Production companies: Società Italiana Cines; Universalcine
- Distributed by: ENIC
- Release date: 10 November 1944
- Running time: 90 minutes
- Country: Italy
- Language: Italian

The Priest's Hat (Italian: Il cappello da prete) is a 1944 Italian historical thriller drama film directed by Ferdinando Maria Poggioli and starring Roldano Lupi, Lída Baarová and Luigi Almirante. It is based on the 1887 novel of the same title by Emilio De Marchi.

It was shot at Cinecittà Studios with sets designed by the art director Gastone Simonetti. It was shot in the summer of 1943, but its release was delayed to ongoing war events and it only premiered in Rome after the city's liberation by the Allies. It belongs to the movies of the calligrafismo style.

== Plot ==
The story is set in Naples in 1888. The Baron of Santafusca, a member of a noble family, has fallen into a life of extravagance and accumulated substantial debts, forcing him to sell his home. In an attempt to obtain money, he breaks into the house of a wealthy defrocked priest who has amassed his fortune through usury. When the priest discovers the robbery, the baron kills him and disposes of his body by throwing it into an abandoned well.

With the crime apparently concealed, the baron resumes his lavish lifestyle. However, he becomes increasingly consumed by guilt and begins to suffer from disturbing visions and nightmares. His fear centers on a priest's hat left behind after the murder, which he comes to regard as a reminder of the crime. As his obsession with the hat grows, the baron's behavior becomes increasingly erratic, leading him through a series of increasingly disturbing incidents and bringing him close to madness and imprisonment.

== Cast ==
- Roldano Lupi as Il barone Carlo di Santafusca
- Lída Baarová as Marinella
- Luigi Almirante as Don Cirillo, il prete
- Carlo Lombardi as Il conte Vico di Spiano
- Loris Gizzi as Il marchese Usilli
- Luigi Pavese as Il giudice Martellini
- Giovanni Grasso as L'avvocato Francesco Scuoto
- Checco Rissone as Filippino
- Mario Colli as Il conte Ignazio
- Elio Marcuzzo as Giorgio Di Sauro
- Anna Capodaglio as Maddalena
- Diana Mercanti as Lellina, una ballerina
- Riccardo Billi as Il barbiere
- Oreste Fares as Don Antonio
- Giuseppe Pierozzi as L'amministratore del Sacro Monte delle orfanelle
- Gualtiero Isnenghi as Il prete incaricato dal Vacariato
- Gorella Gori as Chiarina
- Nicola Maldacea as Un amico di Filippino

== Bibliography ==
- Peter Bondanella & Federico Pacchioni. A History of Italian Cinema. Bloomsbury Publishing, 2017.
