= Luisa Rossi =

Italian actress (1925–1984)

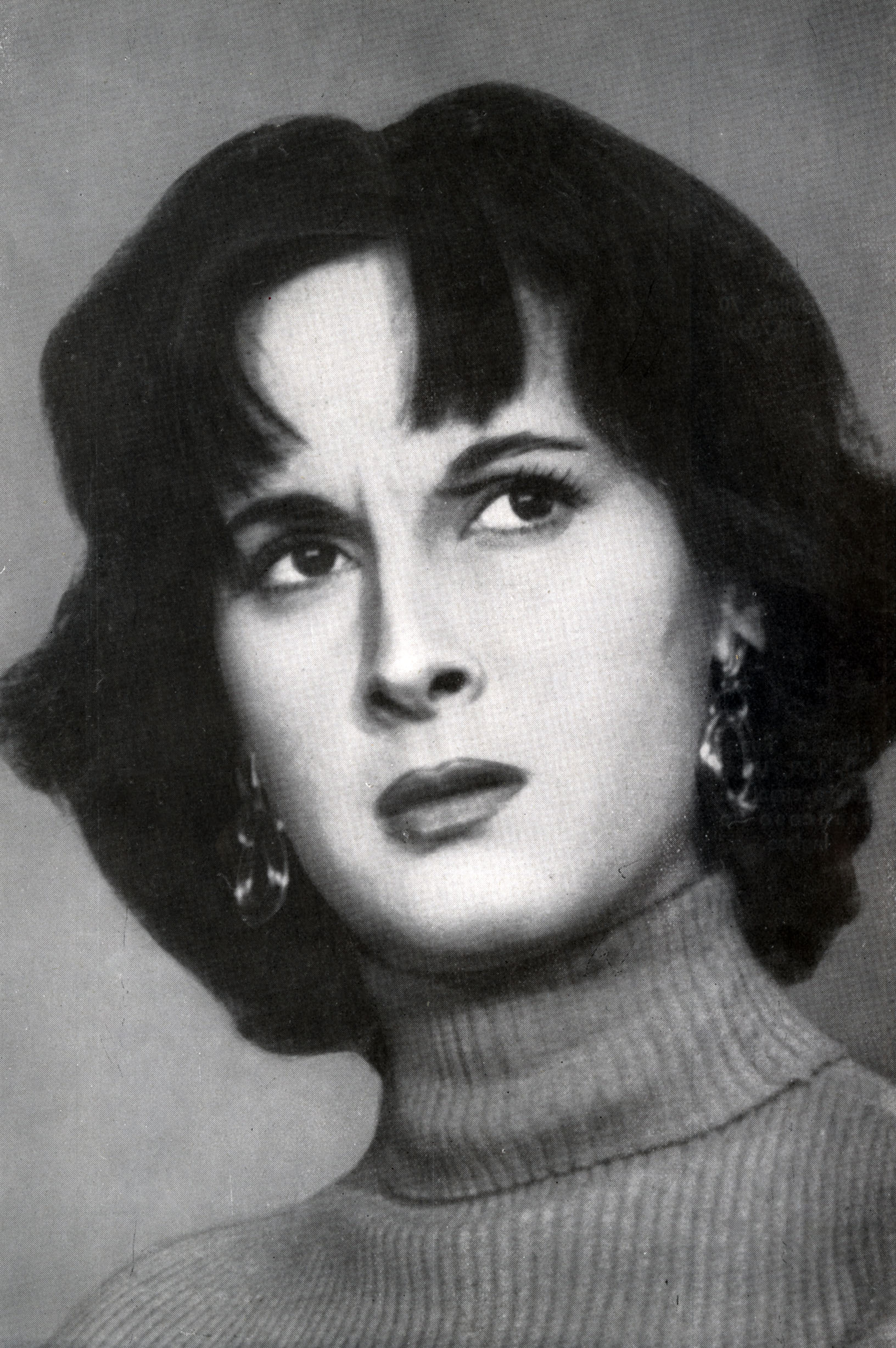
- Born: 26 January 1925; Milan, Italy
- Died: 23 May 1984 (aged 59); Rome, Italy
- Occupation: Actress
- Years active: 1941–1978

Luisa Rossi (26 January 1925 – 23 May 1984) was an Italian actress. She appeared in 25 films between 1941 and 1978.

Born in Milan, Rossi debuted at young age in a significant role in Mario Mattoli's Ho tanta voglia di cantare (1943). In 1945 Rossi obtained a large critical appreciation with Leopold Lindtberg's The Last Chance, but she failed to capitalize on her early success and her following parts were mainly supporting roles in often modest productions.

Unsatisfied with her film career, since mid-1950s Rossi focused her career on television and especially on stage, in which she worked with, among others, Luchino Visconti, Giorgio Strehler and Dario Fo.

== Selected filmography ==
- The King of England Will Not Pay (1941)
- Anything for a Song (1943)
- The Last Chance (1945)
- The Wolf of the Sila (1949)
- Il monello della strada (1951)
- Rapture (1950)
- Redemption (1952)
- Stranger on the Prowl (1952)
- Poppy (1952)
- Loving You Is My Sin (1953)
- Finalmente libero! (1954)
- The Affair of the Poisons (1955)
- Suor Letizia (1956)
- Ecce Bombo (1978)
