= Flying Squadron (film) =

- Directed by: Luigi Capuano
- Written by: Diego Calcagno; Luigi Capuano; Rodolfo Gentile; Anton Giulio Majano; Domenico Meccoli; Fulvio Palmieri; Corrado Pavolini; Weiss Ruffilli
- Produced by: Aldo Raciti
- Starring: Massimo Serato; Dina Sassoli; Umberto Spadaro
- Cinematography: Piero Portalupi
- Music by: Alessandro Cicognini
- Production company: Major Film
- Distributed by: Union Film
- Release date: 1949
- Running time: 92 minutes
- Country: Italy
- Language: Italian

Flying Squadron (Italian: Rondini in volo) is a 1949 Italian adventure film directed by Luigi Capuano and starring Massimo Serato, Dina Sassoli and Umberto Spadaro.

The film's sets were designed by Alfredo Montori.

== Cast ==
- Massimo Serato as Ufficiale d'aviazione
- Dina Sassoli as Elena Baldini
- Umberto Spadaro as Don Leoni
- Gianfranco Magalotti as Massimo
- Mirko Ellis as Mario
- Mario Ferrari as Generale Artesi
- Gabriele Ferzetti as Ufficiale d'aviazione
- Giovanni Grasso jr. as capo Dei Contadini
- Maria Grazia Francia as Figlia Del Capo Dei Cantadini
- Guido Celano
- Andrea Checchi
- Paolo Panelli
- Carlo Sposito
- Erminio Spalla
- Claudio Ermelli
- Giovanna Scotto
- Franco Pesce
