= Parola di ladro =

- Directed by: Gianni Puccini; Nanni Loy
- Starring: Gabriele Ferzetti; Abbe Lane; Andrea Checchi; Nadia Gray; Memmo Carotenuto; Nando Bruno; Enrico Glori; Marisa Traversi; Ciccio Barbi
- Cinematography: Roberto Gerardi
- Music by: Mario Nascimbene
- Release date: 1957
- Country: Italy
- Language: Italian

Parola di ladro (internationally released as Honor Among Thieves) is a 1957 Italian comedy film. It stars actor Gabriele Ferzetti. This film represents the directorial debut of Gianni Puccini and Nanni Loy. For this film Andrea Checchi was awarded a Silver Ribbon for best supporting actor.
