= Il tallone di Achille =

Il Tallone di Achille
- Directed by: Mario Amendola; Ruggero Maccari
- Cinematography: Renato Del Frate
- Edited by: Nino Baragli
- Release date: 1952
- Country: Italy
- Language: Italian

Il Tallone di Achille is a 1952 Italian comedy film.

== Cast ==
- Tino Scotti as Cav. Achille Rosso
- Tamara Lees as Sonia
- Paolo Stoppa as Lo Strozzino Serafino
- Titina De Filippo as Cantoniera di Roma
- Lauro Gazzolo as Ing, Felix
- Marisa Merlini as Zizì
- Aroldo Tieri as Pazzo della Reincarnazione
- Loris Gizzi as Psicanalista Gregorius
- Renato Malavasi as Uff. di Stato Civile
- Luigi Pavese as Dott. Paridi
- Nino Pavese as Bandito Risciotta
- Pina Piovani as Madre della Bambina
- Tecla Scarano as Stella Piccola
- Xenia Valderi as La Giornalista
- Primo Carnera as himself
