= The Priest's Hat =

1887 novel by Emilio De Marchi

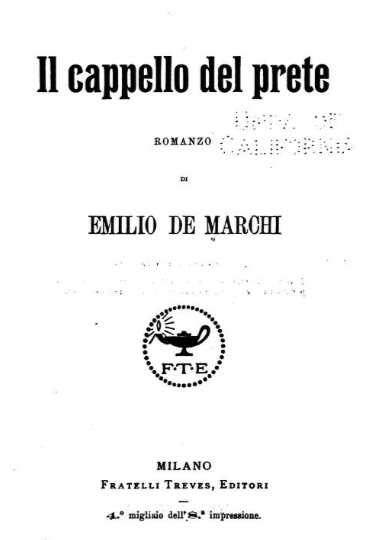
- Title page for Il cappello del prete (1918 edition)
- Author: Emilio De Marchi
- Original title: Il cappello del prete
- Translator: Frederick A. Y. Brown
- Language: Italian
- Publication date: June 1887
- Publication place: Italy
- English publication date: 1935

The Priest's Hat (Italian: Il cappello del prete) is an 1887 novel by the Italian writer Emilio De Marchi.

== Background ==
Emilio De Marchi wrote The Priest's Hat in an attempt to create a popular serial novel that was of high literary level. It was deliberately written to avoid features that De Marchi associated with French literature and considered obscene. It was inspired by a real murder case.

== Plot ==
The Priest's Hat is about Carlo Coriolano, a baron and impoverished former playboy in Naples who plots to murder a greedy priest to be able to repay a loan.

== Publication ==
The story was serialised in June 1887 and published as a book in 1888. It stood out with its ambitious marketing campaign, which included large posters depicting a mysterious hat that were placed all over Milan. It became a major bestseller in Italy.

In 2003, the scholar Nicolas J. Perella called the novel "a nicely wrought 'mystery' structured in the fashion of the appendix novel but written without the crudeness of style and language that too often characterized that genre". He wrote that it is "written in a readily accessible, yet dignified manner, and with just enough psychological probing to add some depth to the story".

== Adaptations ==
The novel was the basis for the 1944 film The Priest's Hat directed by Ferdinando Maria Poggioli and the 1970 RAI TV serial Il cappello del prete directed by Sandro Bolchi.
