= Francesco Pasinetti =

Italian film director and screenwriter

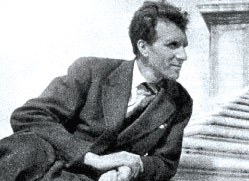
- Born: 1 June 1911; Venice, Veneto; Italy
- Died: 2 April 1949 (aged 37); Rome, Lazio; Italy
- Occupation: Director
- Years active: 1934–1949 (film)

Francesco Pasinetti (1911–1949) was an Italian film director and screenwriter known largely for his documentaries. He also directed the 1934 realist feature film The Canal of the Angels set in Venice. His brother was the writer Pier Maria Pasinetti.

A native of Venice, Pasinetti attempted in the final days of the Second World War to persuade the Allies to support making Venice the capital of the post-war Italian film industry (Venice had emerged as the centre of filmmaking in the Fascist Italian Social Republic). However, this attempt failed and production largely returned to the capital in Rome.

== Selected filmography ==
=== Director ===
- The Canal of the Angels (1934)

=== Screenwriter ===
- The Ambassador (1936)
- The Two Misanthropists (1937)
- The Last Enemy (1938)
- The Sinner (1940)
- Street of the Five Moons (1942)
- The Innkeeper (1944)

== Sources ==
- Brunetta, Gian Piero. The History of Italian Cinema: A Guide to Italian Film from Its Origins to the Twenty-first Century. Princeton University Press, 2009.
