= Umberto Barbaro =

Italian film critic and essayist (1902–1959)

Umberto Barbaro (3 January 1902, Acireale – 19 March 1959, Rome) was an Italian film critic and essayist.

== Biography ==
Umberto Barbaro was active in many fields: fiction, drama, cinema, criticism and history of figurative art. In 1923 he was the editor of La bilancia and collaborated with Dino Terra, Vinicio Paladini and Paolo Flores. In 1927 he was among the leaders of the Movimento Immaginista and one of the "left" among the Futurists. His work received attention in France, America, Russia and Germany. With Anton Giulio Bragaglia he founded the Teatro degli Indipendenti in Rome. He knew Russian and German and translated the works of Heinrich von Kleist, Mikhail Bulgakov and Frank Wedekind into Italian. Barbaro was a journalist, essayist, novelist and his writings appear in several magazines of the time.

In 1936 he co-founded, with Luigi Chiarini, the Centro Sperimentale di Cinematografia in Rome and became a teacher. They published the monthly film magazine Bianco e Nero, directly tied to the Centro Sperimentale. After the Second World War, Barbaro continued his studies on cinema in general and in particular Soviet cinema. He made additional translations into Italian of the writings of theorists of cinema, including Vsevolod Pudovkin, Sergej Mikhailovich Eisenstein, Rudolf Arnheim and Béla Balázs. In 1947 he also translated Sigmund Freud. In 1945 Barbaro was appointed Special Commissioner by the Centro Sperimentale di Cinematografia, a position he held until 1947, when it was removed for political reasons. Barbaro was a backer of the neo-realist cinema.

Barbaro began his filmmaking debut as writer, in 1933 with a documentary, Cantieri dell'Adriatico followed by his only full-length film, L'ultima nemica. After the war turns, with the help of Roberto Longhi, Barbaro made two short of films dedicated to Carpaccio and Caravaggio.

Barbaro was a film critic for L'Unità, the weekly Vie Nuove e a Filmcritica, and the fortnightly L'Eco del cinema magazines.

Umberto Barbaro has been elected to the Biblioteca del Cinema and awarded the Premio Nazionale Filmcritica

== Publications ==
- Luce fredda, novel, Lanciano, Carabba Ed., 1931; reprinted Montepulciano, Ed. Del Grifo, 1990
- L'isola del sale, a novel serialized in L'Italia letteraria, 1935; reprinted Bari, Palomar, 2002
- L'essenza del can barbone, short stories, Lanciano, Carabba, 1931; reprinted Naples, Liguori Ed., 1996
- L'attore, (a cura), Rome, Bianco e Nero Ed., 1938. Text can also be found in Bianco e Nero, 2/3, 1938
- Film: soggetto e sceneggiatura, Rome, Bianco e Nero, 1939
- Il cinema e l'uomo moderno, Rome, Le Edizioni Sociali, 1950
- Poesia del film, Roma, Filmcritica Ed., 1955; reprinted Rome, Bulzoni, 1999
- L'arte dell'attore, with Luigi Chiarini, (edited) Rome, Bianco e Nero Ed.,1950

=== Posthumous works ===
- Il film e il risarcimento marxista dell'arte, Roma, Editori Riuniti, 1960
- Servitù e grandezza del cinema, edited by Lorenzo Quaglietti, Roma, Editori Riuniti, 1962
- Il cinema tedesco, edited by di Mino Argentieri, Roma, Editori Riuniti,1973
- Neorealismo e realismo, edited by Gianpiero Brunetta, Roma, Editori Riuniti, 1973
- Fratelli d'Italia, film script written with Luigi Chiarini, in Cinemasessanta, 302, October–December 2009

== Filmography ==
- Cantieri dell'Adriatico, documentary, director, 1933
- Seconda B (1934)
- The Last Enemy, film, director, 1938
- The Sinner (1940)
- Sleeping Beauty (1942)
- Street of the Five Moons (1942)
- The Innkeeper (1944)
- Carpaccio, documentary, director 1947
- Caravaggio, documentary, director 1948

== Scripts ==
- Seconda B, directed by Goffredo Alessandrini,1934
- La peccatrice, directed by Amleto Palermi, 1941
- Via delle cinque lune, directed by Luigi Chiarini, 1942
- La bella addormentata, directed by Luigi Chiarini, 1942
- Paura d'amare, directed by Gaetano Amata, 1942
- La locandiera, directed by Luigi Chiarini, 1943
- Caccia tragica, directed by Giuseppe De Santis, 1948
- Fabiola, directed by Alessandro Blasetti, 1948. Not credited
- Czarci żleb (The Passage of the Devil), directed by Tadeusz Kański and Aldo Vergano. Poland, unpublished in Italy, 1949
- La figlia del forzato, directed by Gaetano Amata, 1953

== See also ==
- Luigi Chiarini
- Konstantin Stanislavski
