= Luigi Chiarini =

Italian screenwriter and film director (1900–1975)

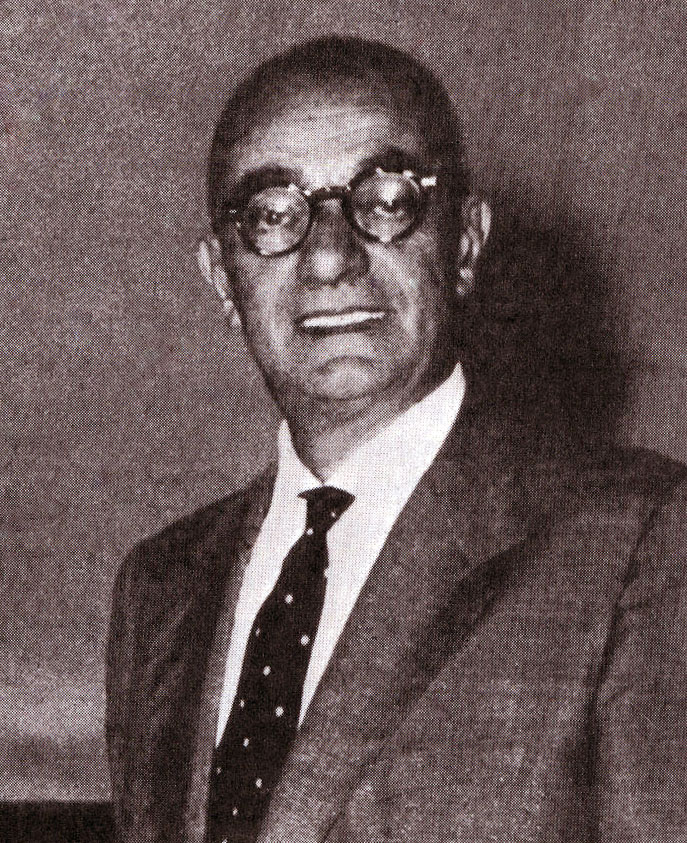
- Luigi Chiarini in 1965
- Born: 20 June 1900; Rome, Lazio, Italy
- Died: 12 November 1975 (aged 75); Rome, Lazio; Italy
- Occupation(s): Essayist; Director; Screenwriter

Luigi Chiarini (20 June 1900 – 12 November 1975) was an Italian film theorist, essayist, screenwriter and film director.

== Life and career ==
Born in Rome, Chiarini wrote extensively about film theory and in 1935 he founded the drama school Centro Sperimentale di Cinematografia in Rome. He later founded and directed the Centro's official journal Bianco e Nero and the magazine Rivista del cinema italiano. In 1961 he was appointed the first chair of film studies in Italy, at the University of Pisa.

Between 1963 and 1968 Chiarini served as artistic director of the Venice International Film Festival. He was also on the jury of the 1937 Venice Film Festival and the 1961 Cannes Film Festival.

== Selected filmography ==
=== Director ===
- Street of the Five Moons (1942)
- Sleeping Beauty (1942)
- The Innkeeper (1944)
- Last Love (1947)
- Pact with the Devil (1950)

=== Screenwriter ===
- The Sinner (1940)
- I cavalieri dalle maschere nere (1948)
- Garibaldi (1961)

== See also ==
- Umberto Barbaro
- Konstantin Stanislavski
