= The Betrothed (1941 film) =

1941 Italian film

- Directed by: Mario Camerini
- Written by: Ivo Perilli; Gabriele Baldini; Mario Camerini
- Based on: The Betrothed by Alessandro Manzoni
- Produced by: Mario Camerini
- Starring: Gino Cervi; Dina Sassoli; Ruggero Ruggeri; Armando Falconi
- Cinematography: Anchise Brizzi
- Edited by: Mario Serandrei
- Music by: Ildebrando Pizzetti
- Production company: Lux Film
- Distributed by: Lux Film
- Release date: 19 December 1941
- Running time: 112 minutes
- Country: Italy
- Language: Italian

The Betrothed (Italian: I Promessi Sposi) is a 1941 Italian historical drama film directed by Mario Camerini and starring Gino Cervi, Dina Sassoli and Ruggero Ruggeri. It is an adaptation of the 1827 novel The Betrothed by Alessandro Manzoni. The film's producers organised a competition to select the lead actress (eventually won by Sassoli) which was modelled on the hunt for Scarlett O'Hara by the American producer David O. Selznick for Gone With the Wind. It belongs to the movies of the calligrafismo style.

It was shot at the Cinecittà Studios in Rome and on location around Como. The film's sets were created by the art directors Gastone Medin and Gino Brosio while the costumes were designed by Gino Sensani. The novel was turned into a film again in 1964 and a television miniseries in 1989, among other adaptations.

== Plot ==
=== Part One ===
In a small town on Lake Como, the peasants Renzo (short for Lorenzo) and Lucia love each other, but are hampered by the squire Don Rodrigo, who himself has designs on Lucia. By intimidation, he prevents the parish priest Don Abbondio from celebrating the wedding. The good Friar Cristoforo visits Don Rodrigo, but is unable to dissuade him. Since Don Rodrigo's in love with Lucia, he subsequently tries to kidnap her, but Friar Cristoforo helps Renzo and Lucia to escape across a lake. Lucia goes to Monza, to a convent, while Renzo heads to Milan, where he becomes involved in a popular unrest (caused by lack of bread). He narrowly escapes the authorities by giving a false name, after unwittingly revealing it. Lucia is kidnapped by a rich man, a friend of Don Rodrigo, after a female nun (of noble descent) at the convent is coerced into helping.

=== Part Two ===
Lucia is brought to the castle of the Innominato (Nameless), a friend of Don Rodrigo, but he has second thoughts about his cruel action. In fact, the next day the Innominato visits Cardinal Federigo Borromeo and repents in his presence. He decides to set Lucia free, accompanied by the parish priest Don Abbondio, who is subsequently rebuked for his moral weakness. Meanwhile, a plague breaks out in Lombardy, and both Renzo and Lucia are involved in the scourge. Renzo finds Friar Cristoforo in a hospital at Milan, who preaches forgiveness, not revenge. The young man also sees Don Rodrigo, who was also hit by the plague, dying, and decides to forgive him. When Renzo finally finds and embraces Lucia, the two can at last get married (despite a vow she'd made to the contrary), because they are no longer oppressed. Friar Cristoforo is on hand to resolve the theological issues relating to the vow. As he prays, rain begins to fall.

== Partial cast ==
- Gino Cervi as Renzo Tramagliano
- Dina Sassoli as Lucia Mondella
- Ruggero Ruggeri as Il cardinale Federigo Borromeo
- Armando Falconi as Don Abbondio
- Enrico Glori as Don Rodrigo
- Carlo Ninchi as L'Innominato
- Luis Hurtado as Padre Cristoforo
- Evi Maltagliati as La monaca di Monza detta "La Signora"
- Ines Cristina Zacconi as Perpetua
- Franco Scandurra as Il conte Attilio
- Gilda Marchiò as Agnese Mondella, madre di Lucia
- Dino Di Luca as Il Griso
- Enzo Biliotti as Antonio Ferrer
- Lauro Gazzolo as Ambrogio Fusella
- Giacomo Moschini as Il dottor Azzeccagarbugli

== Bibliography ==
- Forgacs, David & Gundle, Stephen. Mass Culture and Italian Society from Fascism to the Cold War. Indiana University Press, 2007.
