= Jacques Sernas =

French actor (1925–2015)

- Lithuanian: Jokūbas Bernardas Šernas
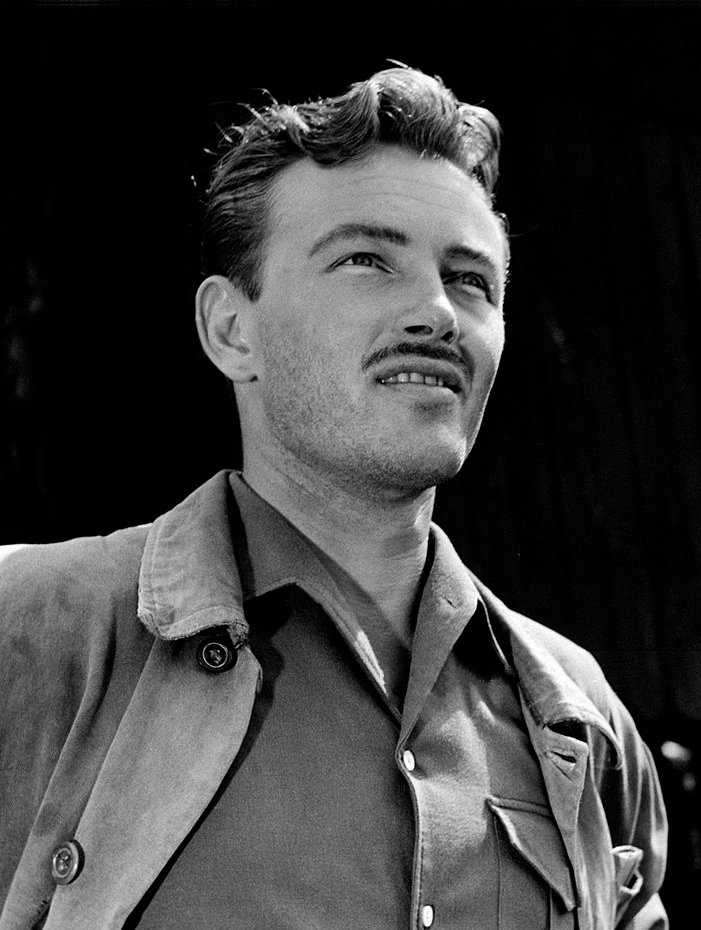
- Sernas in Terra straniera (Foreign Earth), Italy, 1954
- Born: 30 July 1925; Kaunas, Lithuania
- Died: 3 July 2015 (aged 89); Rome, Italy
- Other names: Jack Sernas
- Occupation: Actor
- Years active: 1947–2008
- Spouse: Maria Stella Signorini (1955-?)
- Children: Francesca (b. 1956)
- Parent: Jokūbas Šernas

Jokūbas Bernardas Šernas (30 July 1925 – 3 July 2015), commonly known as Jacques Sernas and sometimes credited as Jack Sernas, was a Lithuanian-born French actor with an international film career.

== Biography ==
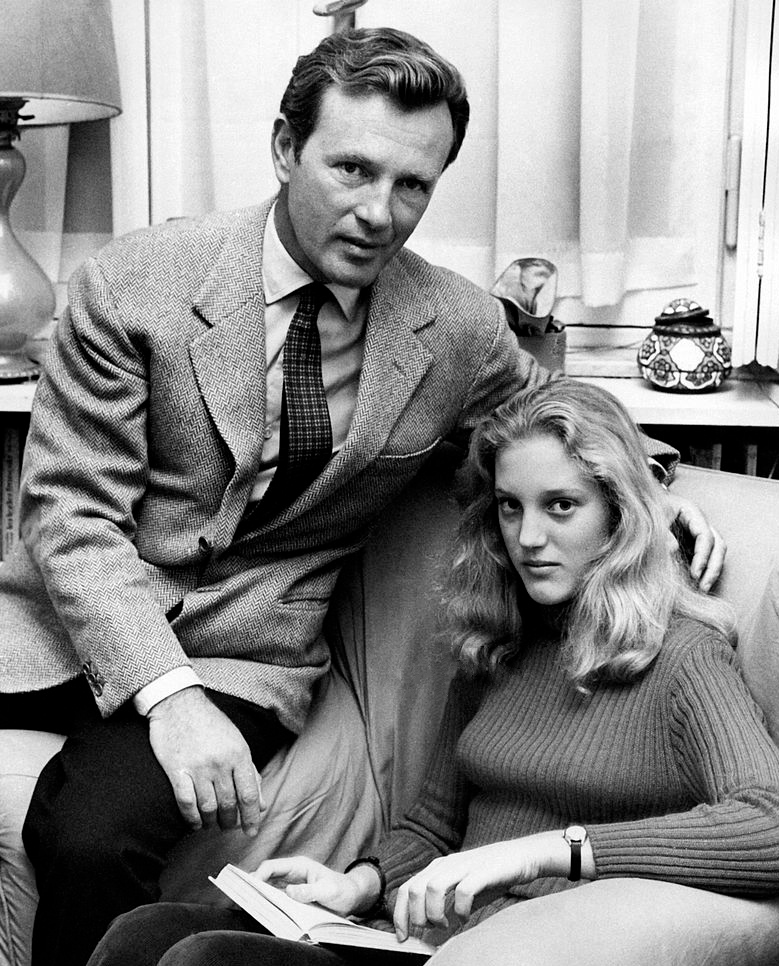
Sernas with daughter Francesca in Rome, 1971.

He was born in Kaunas, Lithuania, the son of Jokūbas Šernas, a signatory of the 1918 Act of Independence of Lithuania, who died when Sernas was one year old. His mother took him to Paris, France, where Sernas received his formal education. During World War II, he joined the French Resistance and was captured and interned at the Nazi Buchenwald concentration camp, near Weimar, Germany. After the war, Sernas was considering a career in medicine and then in journalism before turning to films. His first role was in Miroir (1946).

In June 1955 Sernas married the Roman journalist Maria Stella Signorini. They had a daughter Francesca born in 1956.

== Career ==
Sernas worked first as a leading man and later as a character actor. He is perhaps best known for his role as Paris in the epic film Helen of Troy (1956).

Sernas also appeared on American television, including the lead role in the 1956 Warner Brothers time travel production "Man from 1997" featuring James Garner.

His more recent appearances have included appearing as a Cardinale Feltin in the television biographical film John XXIII: The Pope of Peace (2002) and as Ambasciatore in the television comedy film Regina dei fiori (2005). For the last 30 years Sernas lived and worked in Rome.

== Filmography ==
Title	Year	Genre	Role	Notes
Mirror	1947		Battling-Joe	
L'idole	1948			
Lost Youth	1948	drama	Stefano Manfredi	Nastro d'Argento Best Actor
Letter at Dawn	1948		Mario Maggi	
La Révoltée	1948		Rudy	
Jean de la Lune	1949		Alexandre - le nouvel adorateur de Marceline	
The Mill on the Po	1949	drama	Orbino Verginesi	
Il falco rosso	1949		Raniero d'Atri	
The Wolf of the Sila	1949	drama	Salvatore Barra	
Golden Salamander	1950	adventure	Max	
The Sky Is Red	1950		Tullio	
Pact with the Devil	1950	drama		
Hearts at Sea	1950		Paolo Silvestri	
Fugitive in Trieste	1951	historical	Giulio	
Barbe-Bleue	1951		Giglio	
Bluebeard	1951		Florian	
The Last Sentence	1951	drama	Piero	
Red Shirts	1952	Historical	Gentile	
I figli non si vendono	1952		Carlo Dazzeni / Roberto Dazzeni	
The Angels of the District	1952		Mario	
The Mute of Portici	1952	drama		Uncredited
Finishing School	1953		Jean-Jacques	
Lulu	1953	comedy	Mario	
L'envers du paradis	1953		Blaise d'Orliac	
I Always Loved You	1953		Carlo	
Sua altezza ha detto: no!	1953			
Dieci canzoni d'amore da salvare	1953	drama	Pietro Niccoli, The songwriter	
Terra straniera	1954			
100 Years of Love	1954		Roberto aka Roby, Lucia's Husband	(segment "Amore 1954")
Maddalena	1954	drama	Giovanni Belloni	
Il grande addio	1954			
Barrier of the Law	1954		Aldo	
Loving You Is My Sin	1954	drama	Count Giorgio Danieli	
Jump into Hell	1955	adventure	Captain Guy Bertrand	
Helen of Troy	1956	epic	Paris	
Altair	1956	drama	De Montel	
The Goddess of Love	1957		Laertes	
C'est la faute d'Adam	1957		Gérard Sandret	
Pia de' Tolomei	1958		Ghino Perticari	
Vite perdute	1959		The Baron	
Venetian Honeymoon	1959		Bob Lebel	
Nel Segno di Roma	1959		Julianus	
World of Miracles	1959		Marco Valenti	
The Secret Nights of Lucrezia Borgia	1959		Frederico	
Lost Lives	1959		The Baron	(Vite perdute)
The Loves of Salammbo	1960		Mathos	
La dolce vita	1960		Divo	
Culpables	1960		Emilio	
The Huns	1960		Malok	(La regina dei tartari)
Love in Rome	1960		Tony Meneghini	
Maciste contro il vampiro	1961		Kurtick	
Duel of Champions	1961		Marcus	
The Centurion	1961	historical drama	Caius Vinicius	
Duel of the Titans	1961		Curtius	
Che femmina!! e... che dollari!	1961		Jefferson Thompson	
The Slave	1962		Vetius - companion of late Spartacus	
55 Days at Peking	1963	epic	Maj. Bobrinski	
Last Plane to Baalbek	1964		Nick Mann	
The Dirty Game	1965	Spy film	Sernas	
Balearic Caper	1966		Pierre	
For a Few Extra Dollars	1966	Spaghetti Western	Major Sanders	
American Secret Service	1968			
Midas Run	1969	comedy	Paul Giroux	
Hornets' Nest	1970	war	Major Taussig	
Super Fly T.N.T.	1973		Matty Smith	
E cominciò il viaggio nella vertigine	1974			
Children of Rage	1975	war	Dr. Ben-Joseph	
Last Feelings	1978		Sports Director	
The Skin	1981		Gen Guillaume	
L'Addition	1984		Prison guard	
Io, Peter Pan	1989		Bernard	
Luna di sangue	1989		Dottor Marc Duvivier	
The Miser	1990		Don Guglielmo	
The African Woman	1990		Dr. Wargnier	
Caldo soffocante	1991		Il presidente	
Coppia omicida	1998		Godard	
Amor nello specchio	1999		Principe Bassompierre	
John XXIII: The Pope of Peace	2002	biographical	Cardinale Feltin	TV movie
Regina dei fiori	2005	comedy	Ambasciatore	TV movie

== See also ==
- List of Lithuanian actors
- List of French actors
