= Emilio De Marchi (writer) =

Italian novelist

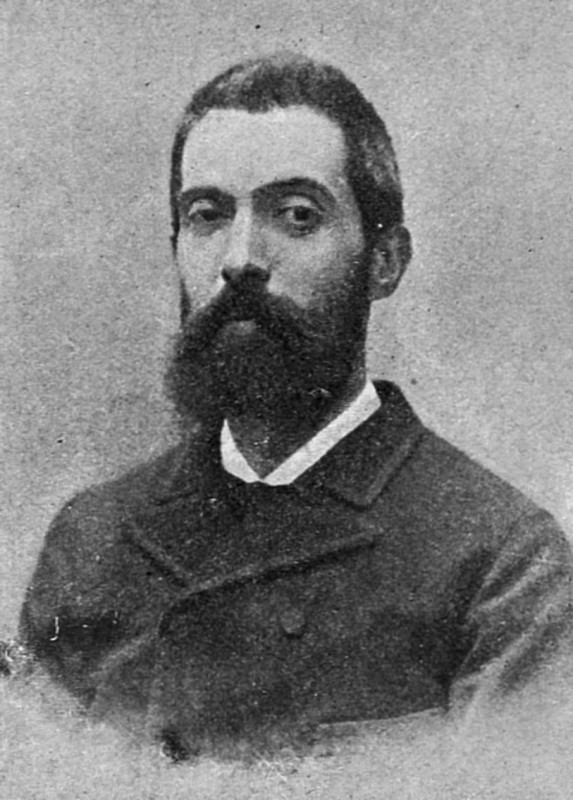
- Born: 31 July 1851; Milan, Lombardy, Austrian Empire
- Died: 6 February 1901 (aged 49); Milan, Lombardy, Kingdom of Italy
- Occupation: Novelist
- Writing career
- Notable work: The Priest's Hat

Emilio De Marchi (31 July 1851 – 6 February 1901) was an Italian novelist, known for his portrayals of Milan and Lombardy in the nineteenth century. Among his most famous works are the 1887 crime novel The Priest's Hat, which became a major bestseller in Italy. Several of his works have been adapted for film and television, including the two 1940s films Giacomo the Idealist and The Priest's Hat. He was part of the second generation of Lombard line.

== Biography ==
A follower of Manzoni and French naturalism, De Marchi saw literature as a vehicle for moral and spiritual improvement. His narratives take as their subject matter the lives of poor and humble people from the petty bourgeoisie and working classes, who regularly meet defeat in a corrupt and immoral society. His intention is to represent the psychological reality of individuals who, because of their ignorance of the way society works, are incapable of realizing their desires. De Marchi's fundamentally conservative approach to social reality prevents him from imagining any other form of society than that based on traditional class structures. His benign and condescending humour, reminiscent of Manzoni, conveys the moral and intellectual superiority of someone who believes his judgement to be infallible.

He gained popularity with his first novel, The Priest's Hat (1888), the story of a petty aristocrat whose remorse for having killed a priest leads him to reveal his guilt. His best-known novel, Demetrio Pianelli (1890), is the story of an honest office worker who, after the suicide of his corrupt stepbrother, falls in love with his widow. Demetrio is portrayed as a humble hero who fights a losing battle against a suffocating social reality. Following an attempt to defend his sister-in-law's honour against the advances of his superior, he is forced to move to another city, where, in denial of his own feelings, he arranges the marriage between her and her wealthy cousin. The following novel, Arabella (1893), is based on the figure of Demetrio's niece, who is also a victim of the depravity of her milieu. Other novels include Il redivivo (1895–6), Giacomo idealista (1897) (in which the defeated protagonist is now a young philosophy student), and Col fuoco non si scherza (1900). He is recognized as the writer of the first Italian novels to be serialized in daily newspapers.

His other works include a respected translation of La Fontaine's fables. He also edited La buona parola, a series of short manuals designed to teach the urban masses their duties and rights, to which he himself contributed twenty-one volumes.

== Bibliography ==
- De Marchi, Emilio (2023). The Priest's Hat. Translated by Steve Eaton and Cinzia Russi. New York and Bristol: Italica Press. ISBN 9781857392296.
- Goble, Alan (1999). The Complete Index to Literary Sources in Film. London: Bowker-Saur. ISBN 9781857392296.
