= Achille Longo =

Italian composer

Achille Longo (28 March 1900 – 28 May 1954) was an Italian composer and music teacher.

== Biography ==
Achille (junior), son of Alessandro and Luisa Todisco, was born in Naples on 28 March 1900. He was a pupil first of his father, and then of A. Savasta at the Naples Conservatory, where he graduated in piano in 1918 and in organ and composition in 1920. He taught harmony and counterpoint at the same conservatory from 1926 to 1930; from 1930 to 1934, he taught harmony and counterpoint at the Parma Conservatory, where, among others, F. Margola was his pupil. In 1934, he returned to the conservatory in Naples, first as a teacher of counterpoint and fugue, and then, from 1941 until his death, of composition. The famous pianist Aldo Ciccolini studied composition with him in Naples.

Achille Longo, along with Beniamino Cesi, Sigismund Thalberg, Alessandro Longo and Vincenzo Vitale, is considered one of the most important Italian piano teachers of the 20th century, and contributed to creating what is considered today the 'Neapolitan piano school'.

== Compositions ==
The following were used in films, orchestras, and also symphonic music.

=== Vocal music ===
- Canzonette de Poliziano (1930)
- Chansons Enfantines (1952)
- Stanze del Poliziano (1930)

=== Sacred ===
- Messe de Requiem (1933)

=== Symphonic ===
- Sinfonie (1950)
- Burla de Piervano Arotto (1933)
- Scenette Pastorale (1924)
