= The Tyrant of Padua =

1946 film directed by Max Neufeld

- DVD cover
- Directed by: Max Neufeld
- Written by: Angelo Bianchini D'Alberico; Raffaele Saitto; Max Neufeld
- Based on: Angelo, Tyrant of Padua by Victor Hugo
- Produced by: Max Calandri
- Starring: Clara Calamai; Carlo Lombardi; Elsa De Giorgi; Alfredo Varelli
- Cinematography: Giuseppe Caracciolo
- Edited by: Eraldo Da Roma
- Music by: Renzo Rossellini
- Production company: Scalera Film
- Distributed by: Scalera Film
- Release date: 28 December 1946
- Running time: 95 minutes
- Country: Italy
- Language: Italian

The Tyrant of Padua (Italian: Il tiranno di Padova) is a 1946 Italian historical film directed by Max Neufeld and starring Clara Calamai, Carlo Lombardi and Elsa De Giorgi. It is an adaptation of the 1835 play Angelo, Tyrant of Padua by Victor Hugo. It is set in Padua in the 1540s.

Made by Scalera Films, it was shot at the Cinevillaggio Studios complex in Venice during the wartime Italian Social Republic. The film's sets were designed by the art director Luigi Scaccianoce and Ottavio Scotti.

== Cast ==
- Carlo Lombardi as Angelo Malipieri
- Clara Calamai as Tisbe
- Elsa De Giorgi as Caterina Bragadin in Malipieri
- Alfredo Varelli as Rodolfo degli Ezzelini
- Nino Pavese as Una spia
- Giorgio Piamonti as Omodei
- Erminio Spalla as Un evaso
- Carlo Micheluzzi as Il padre di Caterina
- Olga Vittoria Gentilli as La madre di Tisbe
- Memo Benassi as Cesare, il pittore
- Andreina Carli as Reginella
- Cristina Veronesi

== Bibliography ==
- Brunetta, Gian Piero (2009). The History of Italian Cinema: A Guide to Italian Film from Its Origins to the Twenty-first Century. Princeton University Press. ISBN 978-0-691-11988-5 – via Internet Archive.
