= Carlo Micheluzzi =

Italian stage and film actor

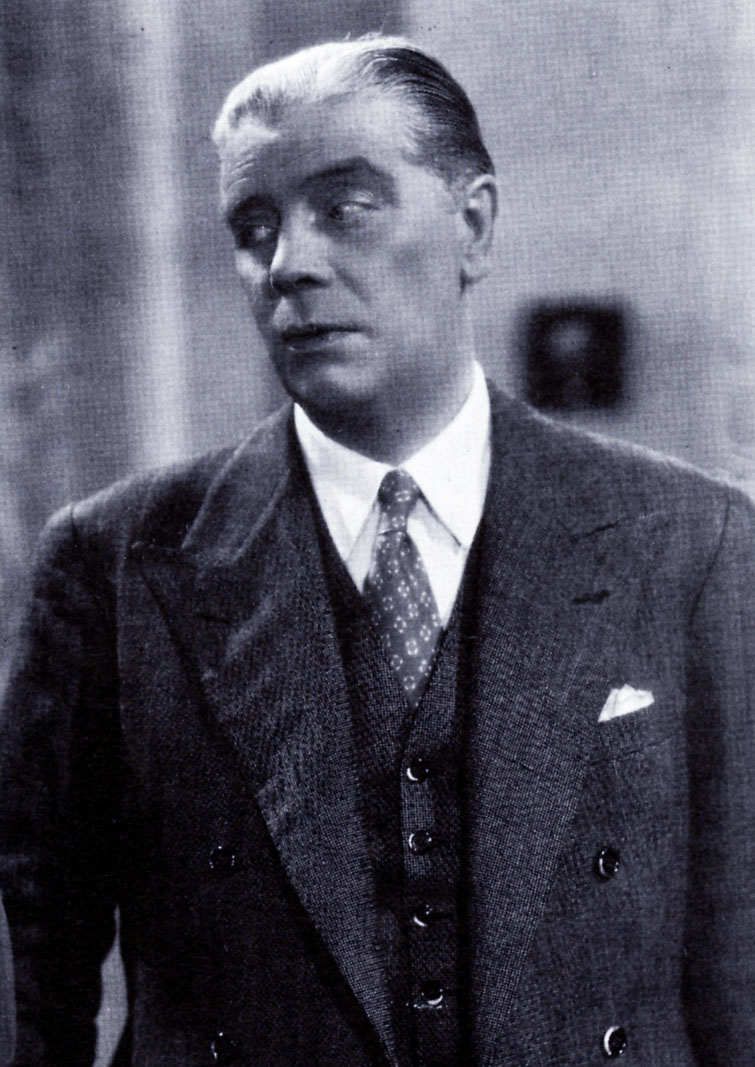
- Born: 10 May 1886; Naples, Campania, Italy
- Died: 21 November 1973 (aged 87); Venice, Veneto, Italy
- Occupation: Actor
- Years active: 1939–1955 (film)

Carlo Micheluzzi (1886–1973) was an Italian stage and film actor.

Son if an actor and brother of another actor (Leo Micheluzzi), he began his career in 1903 acting in the Venetian company Zago-Borisi. Over time he formed various companies that included important names such as Gianfranco Giachetti, Cesco Baseggio and Gianni Cavalieri. In 1923 he married the actress Margherita Seglin.

During the period of the Italian Social Republic he was one of the few actors active in republican cinematography on the sets of the Cinevillaggio in Venice.

== Filmography ==
Year	Title	Role	Notes
1939	We Were Seven Widows	Matteo	
1939	Lo vedi come sei... lo vedi come sei?	A customer	Uncredited
1941	Schoolgirl Diary	Commendator Campolmi, father of Anna	
1942	I Live as I Please	The traveling salesman.	
1942	Before the Postman	Angelo Pandolin	
1942	Love Story	Bibi - The anxious father	
1942	The Lady Is Fickle	Commendator Carlo	
1943	Incontri di notte	Commendator Guarneri	
1943	Two Suffer Better Than One	Mister Barduzzi	
1943	C'è sempre un ma!	Father of Fabrizio	
1943	The Innkeeper	Comedian leader	
1944	Fiori d'arancio	Ippolito Alberti	
1945	Peccatori		
1945	Trent'anni di servizio		
1946	Ritorno al nido	The barber Espinazio	
1946	The Devil's Gondola	Minister of Justice	
1946	The Tyrant of Padua	The father of Caterina	
1946	La vita semplice		
1946	Sangue a Ca' Foscari		
1947	L'orfanella delle stelle		
1948	Toto Tours Italy	The devil	
1953	Sul ponte dei sospiri	The Doge	
1955	La moglie è uguale per tutti	Colonel 'Bepi' Ridolfi	
1955	Eighteen Year Olds	Comm. Campolmi	(final film role)

== Bibliography ==
- Joseph Farrell & Paolo Puppa. A History of Italian Theatre. Cambridge University Press, 2006.
