= Erminio Spalla =

Italian actor and boxer

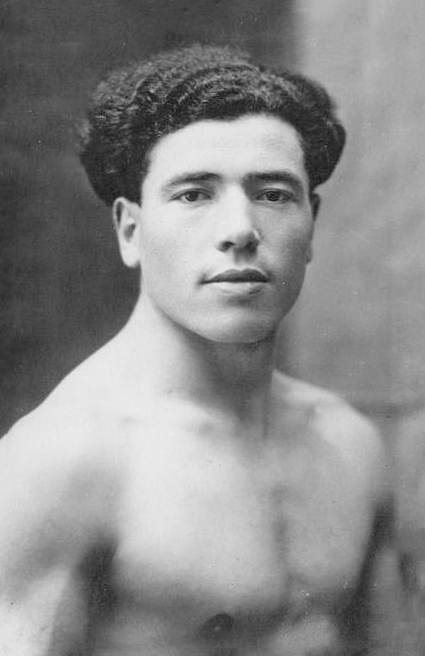
- Erminio Spalla in the 1920s

Personal information
- Nickname: Occhiovivo
- Nationality: Italy
- Born: 7 July 1897 Borgo San Martino, Italy
- Died: 14 August 1971 (aged 74) Rome, Italy
- Height: 1.85 m (6 ft 1 in)
- Weight: Heavyweight

Boxing career
- Stance: Orthodox

Boxing record
- Total fights: 56
- Wins: 42
- Win by KO: 31
- Losses: 10
- Draws: 3

Erminio Spalla (7 July 1897 – 14 August 1971) was an Italian professional heavyweight boxer, film actor and singer.

Spalla studied fine arts in Brera, when in 1910 he saw film footage of the world boxing championships and decided to become a professional boxer. He was the first Italian to win a European boxing title, which he did in 1923. He lost it in 1926 to Paulino Uzcudun and retired from boxing the next year, though he briefly returned to the ring in 1934 and won all three of his final bouts. He returned to art after retiring from the ring.

In October 1937 he debuted as an opera singer in Nel Trovatore in Turin. In the same year he also worked in sculpture and painting.

In 1939 he acted in his first film, Io, suo padre by Mario Bonnard. This was followed by over fifty films and television series, including the war film Giarabub (1942). His last film was I fratelli Karamazov by Sandro Bolchi (1969).

His elder brother Giuseppe was also a boxer.

== Selected filmography ==
- Il match dei 100.000 dollari (1921)
- I, His Father (1939) - Romolo Tonelli
- The Silent Partner (1939) - Il colonello
- Il signore della taverna (1940)
- Il ponte dei sospiri (1940) - Scalabrino
- La compagnia della teppa (1941) - L'oste Bartolomeo Borghi
- The Hero of Venice (1941) - Franco
- Captain Tempest (1942) - El Kadur
- The Lion of Damascus (1942) - El Kadur
- Arriviamo noi! (1942) - Il terzo gestorio del "castello delle streghe"
- Giarabub (1942) - Il meccanico "Mago Bakù" Brambilla
- I due Foscari (1942) - Oliviero
- Il fanciullo del West (1942) - Il fattore dei Carey
- Knights of the Desert (1942)
- The Champion (1943) - Mario Martini
- Harlem (1943) - Franckie Battaglia, l'allenatore
- Romulus and the Sabines (1945) - Giovanni, il carrettiere
- Senza famiglia (1946) - Vitali
- Ogni giorno è domenica (1946) - Stefano
- The Devil's Gondola (1946) - Marco, il gondoliere
- The Tyrant of Padua (1946) - Un evaso
- Sangue a Ca' Foscari (1946)
- The Opium Den (1947)
- The Adventures of Pinocchio (1947) - Mangiafuoco
- Cab Number 13 (1948) - Le marin
- Fabíola (1949)
- The Pirates of Capri (1949)
- Flying Squadron (1949)
- Santo disonore (1950) - Oreste
- Deported (1950) - Benjamino Barda
- Bluebeard's Six Wives (1950) - L'Autista
- Miracle in Milan (1951) - Gaetano
- O Comprador de Fazendas (1951)
- A Flea on the Scales (1953)
- A Família Lero-Lero (1953)
- Lights Out (1953)
- Chéri-Bibi (1955) - Il rosso
- The Red Cloak (1955)
- Io piaccio (1955) - Man who abducts Roberto Maldi (uncredited)
- Torna piccina mia! (1955) - Zoras
- Vendicata! (1956)
- Wives and Obscurities (1956) - Oste
- A Estrada (1956)
- Poor, But Handsome (1957) - Amico del padre di Giovanna
- Addio sogni di gloria (1957)
- Song of Naples (1957) - Docker
- Solo Dio mi fermerà (1957)
- Il Conte di Matera (1958) - Amico di Golia
- Angel in a Taxi (1958) - Un saltimbanco
- The Naked Maja (1958) - Rojas (the Innkeeper)
- The Defeated Victor (1959) - Coach (allenatore)
- The Pirate and the Slave Girl (1959) - Malik
- Agosto, donne mie non vi conosco (1959)
- Il Mattatore (1960) - Un detenuto (uncredited)
- Siege of Syracuse (1960) - Taverniere (uncredited)
- Minotaur, the Wild Beast of Crete (1960) - Padre Addottivo di Arianna
- The Prisoner of the Iron Mask (1961)
- The Fury of Achilles (1962) - Nestor
- Taur, il re della forza bruta (1963) - Re di Shrupuk
- The Sailor from Gibraltar (1967) - Eolo
