= The Great Dawn (1947 film) =

1947 film

- French poster
- Directed by: Giuseppe Maria Scotese
- Written by: Oreste Biancoli; Massimo Ferrara; Edoardo Micucci; Giovanni Soria; Cesare Zavattini; Giuseppe Maria Scotese
- Produced by: Nando Pisani
- Starring: Renée Faure; Rossano Brazzi; Giovanni Grasso; Yvonne Sanson
- Cinematography: Otello Martelli
- Edited by: Mireille Bessette; Eraldo Da Roma
- Music by: Edoardo Micucci
- Production company: Scalera Film
- Distributed by: Scalera Film; DisCina (France)
- Release date: 21 March 1947
- Running time: 90 minutes
- Country: Italy
- Language: Italian

The Great Dawn (Italian: La grande aurora) is a 1947 Italian drama film directed by Giuseppe Maria Scotese and starring Renée Faure, Rossano Brazzi and Giovanni Grasso. The Greek actress and future star Yvonne Sanson made an early appearance in the film.

It was produced by Scalera Film and began production at the Cinevillaggio Studios complex in Venice during the wartime Italian Social Republic. The film's sets were designed by the art director Vittorio Valentini. Significant delays followed until its completion and release in postwar Italy.

== Synopsis ==
A gifted young musical prodigy is encouraged to pursue his talents.

== Cast ==
- Renée Faure as Anna Gamba
- Rossano Brazzi as Renzo Gamba
- Giovanni Grasso as Oreste Bellotti
- Michele Riccardini as Don Terenzio
- Yvonne Sanson as Daisy
- Fausto Guerzoni as Fausto
- Loris Gizzi as Cooky
- Guglielmo Sinaz as Salesman
- Dante Maggio
- Pierino Gamba as Pierino, direttore d'orchestre

== Bibliography ==
- Moliterno, Gino. The A to Z of Italian Cinema. Scarecrow Press, 2009.
