= Giarabub (film) =

1942 film

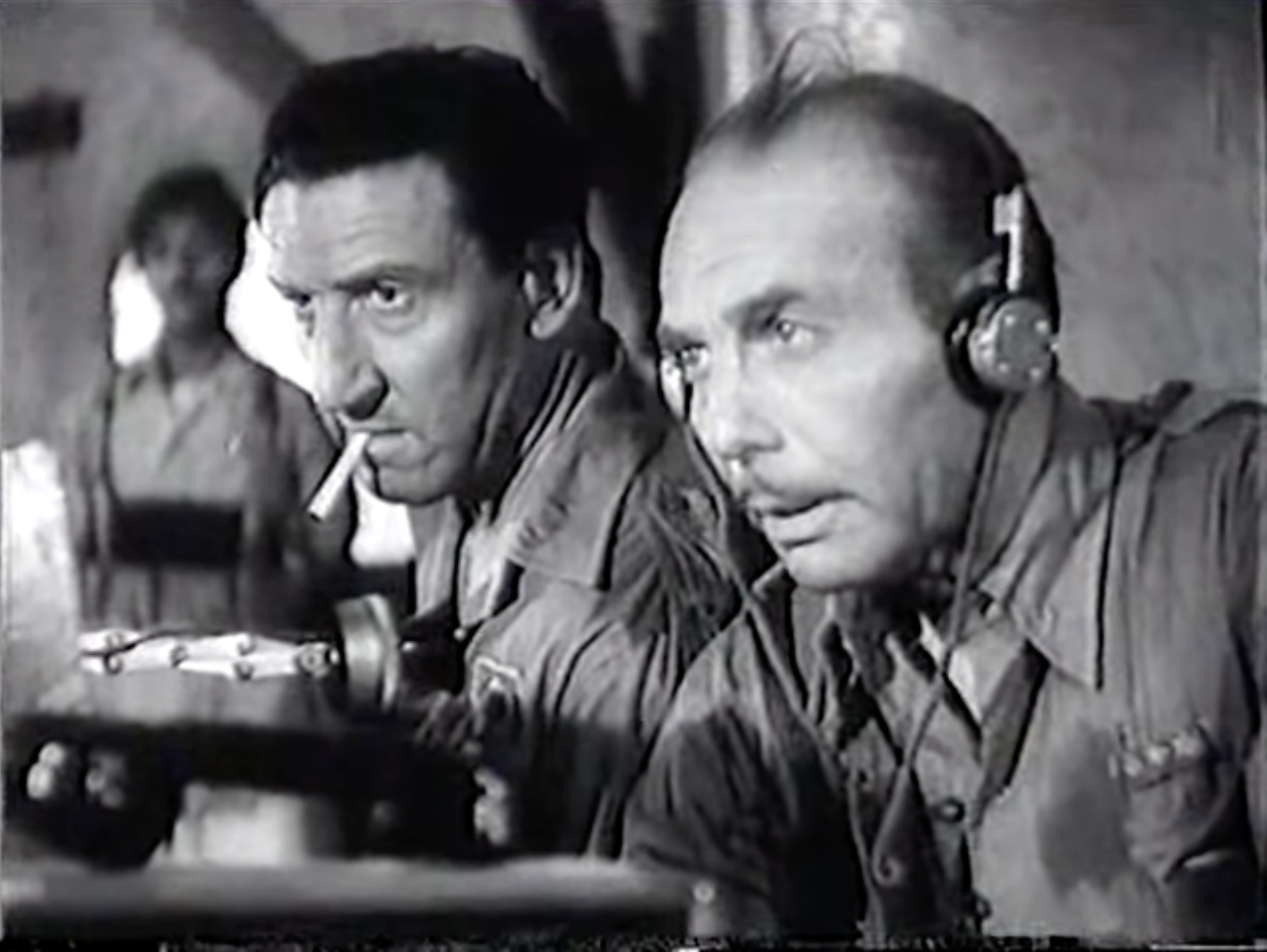
- Ninchi and Ferrari in a film scene
- Directed by: Goffredo Alessandrini
- Written by: Oreste Biancoli; Alberto Consiglio; Gherardo Gherardi; Asvero Gravelli; Gian Gaspare Napolitano; Orio Vergani
- Starring: Carlo Ninchi; Mario Ferrari; Doris Duranti; Carlo Romano
- Cinematography: Giuseppe Caracciolo; Livio Dall'Aglio
- Edited by: Eraldo Da Roma
- Music by: Renzo Rossellini
- Production company: Scalera Film
- Distributed by: Scalera Film
- Release date: 8 May 1942
- Running time: 85 minutes
- Country: Italy
- Language: Italian

Giarabub is a 1942 Italian war film directed by Goffredo Alessandrini and starring Carlo Ninchi, Mario Ferrari and Doris Duranti. The film was a propaganda work which portrayed the Siege of Giarabub (1940–41) during the Second World War, in which Italian troops defended Jaghbub, Libya, for three months against Allied forces.

== Partial cast ==
- Carlo Ninchi as Il maggiore Castagna
- Mario Ferrari as Il capitano Del Grande
- Doris Duranti as Dolores
- Carlo Romano as Il maresciallo Romano
- Annibale Betrone as Il dottor Alberti
- Elio Steiner as Il tenente Negri
- Erminio Spalla as Il meccanico "Mago Bakù" Brambilla
- Corrado De Cenzo as Il capitano De Cenzo
- Guido Notari as Il maggiore Squillace
- Mario Liberati as Il telegrafista Liberati
- Nico Pepe as Il tenente Corsi
- Emilio Cigoli as Il maggiore John Williams

== Bibliography ==
- Gundle, Stephen (2013). Mussolini's Dream Factory: Film Stardom in Fascist Italy. New York-Oxford: Berghahn Books. ISBN 978-1782382447.
