= The Devil's Gondola =

1946 film directed by Carlo Campogalliani

- Directed by: Carlo Campogalliani
- Written by: Max Calandri; Marcello Pagliero; Carlo Campogalliani
- Produced by: Paolo Leoni
- Starring: Loredana; Carlo Lombardi; Erminio Spa; Nino Pavese
- Cinematography: Mario Albertelli; Antonio Marzari
- Edited by: Eraldo Da Roma
- Music by: Umberto Mancini
- Production company: Scalera Film
- Distributed by: Scalera Film
- Release date: 21 November 1946
- Running time: 125 minutes
- Country: Italy
- Language: Italian

The Devil's Gondola (Italian: La gondola del diavolo) is a 1946 Italian historical drama-crime film directed by Carlo Campogalliani and starring Loredana, Carlo Lombardi, and Erminio Spalla.

Made by Scalera Films, it was shot at the Cinevillaggio Studios complex in Venice during the wartime Italian Social Republic. The film's sets were designed by the art directors Luigi Scaccianoce and Ottavio Scotti.

== Synopsis ==
In the Venetian Republic a series of murders are carried out by a hooded man in black who always makes his escape through the city's waterways on a gondola.

== Cast ==
- Loredana as Marina
- Carlo Lombardi as messer Stelio Ricunis
- Erminio Spalla as Marco, il gondoliere
- Nino Pavese as Idillius, il bravo
- Alfredo Varelli as Paolo Venier
- Flora Marino as Imperia
- Letizia Quaranta as Madre di Paolo
- Carlo Micheluzzi as Il ministro di giustizia
- Mario Sailer as Lorenzo
- Giorgio Piamonti as Alvise Venier, padre di Paolo
- Edgardo Pellegrini as Bambino
- Giorgio Malvezzi as Uomo bravo
- Roberto Mauri as Altro bravo
- Michael Tor as Oste
- Gianni Cavalieri as ambasciatore di Francia
- Giorgia Piccoli
- Cristina Veronesi

== Bibliography ==
- Klossner, Michael. The Europe of 1500-1815 on film and television: a worldwide filmography of over 2550 works, 1895 through 2000. McFarland & Co., 2002.
