= I, His Father =

1939 film directed by Mario Bonnard

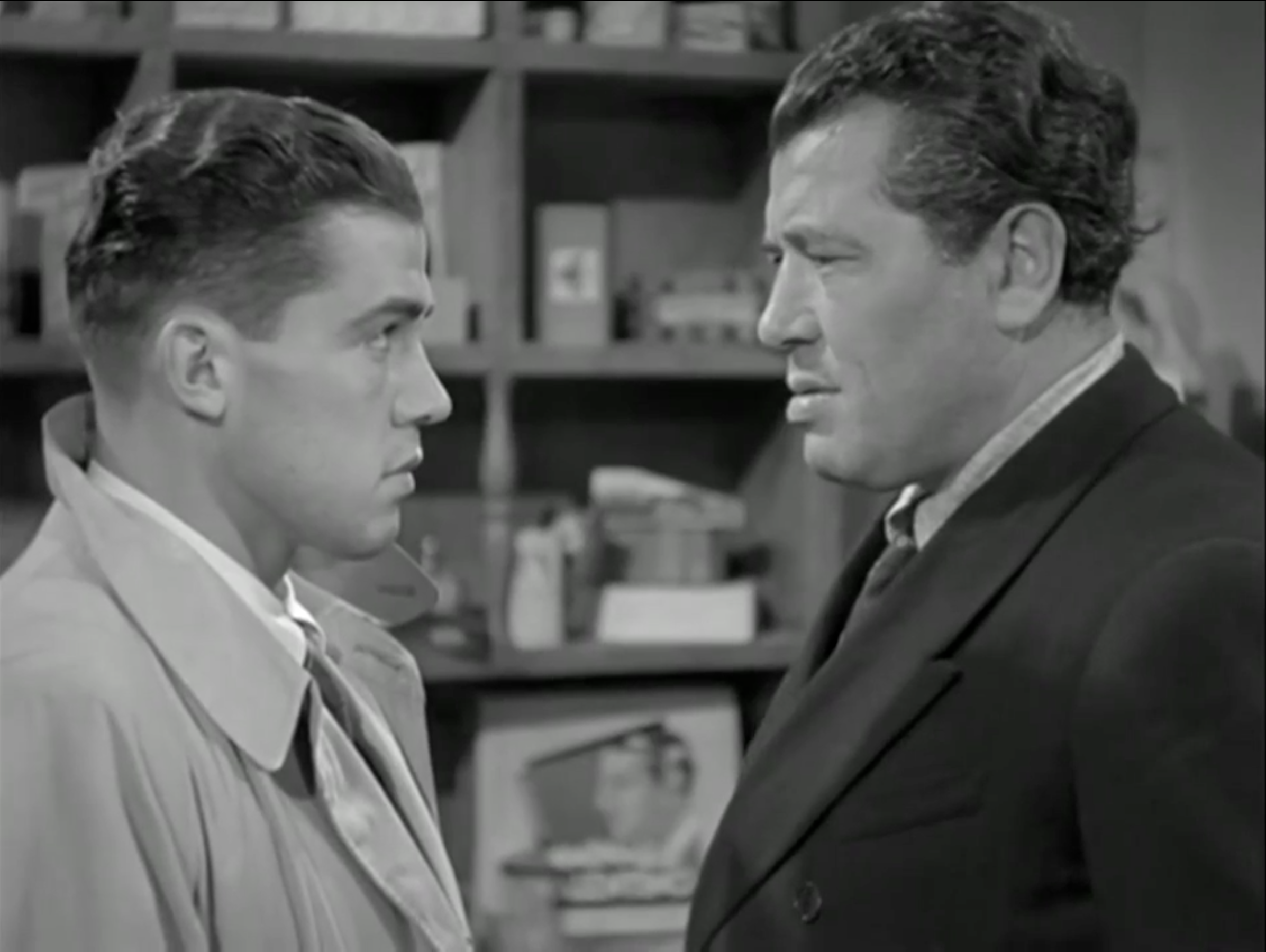
- Lanza and Spalla in a film scene
- Directed by: Mario Bonnard
- Written by: Alba De Cespedes (novel); Ivo Perilli; Amedeo Castellazzi; Mario Bonnard
- Starring: Erminio Spalla; Mariella Lotti; Clara Calamai
- Cinematography: Otello Martelli
- Edited by: Gabriele Varriale
- Music by: Giulio Bonnard
- Production company: Scalera Film
- Distributed by: Scalera Film
- Release date: 8 March 1939
- Running time: 92 minutes
- Country: Italy
- Language: Italian

I, His Father (Italian: Io, suo padre) is a 1939 Italian sports drama film directed by Mario Bonnard and starring Erminio Spalla, Mariella Lotti and Clara Calamai.

It was shot at the Scalera Studios in Rome. The film's sets were designed by the art director Ottavio Scotti.

== Cast ==
- Erminio Spalla as Romolo Tonelli
- Augusto Lanza as Augusto Tonelli
- Evi Maltagliati as Eva
- Mariella Lotti as Anna
- Clara Calamai as Renata
- Margherita Bagni as Amalia Tonelli
- Carlo Romano as Giorgio
- Piero Pastore as Sandro
- Guido Notari as Roberto
- Vittorio Venturi as Radesio
- Virgilio Riento as Il cavaliere
- Lauro Gazzolo as Sardella
- Alfredo Varelli as Un amico di Radesio
- Gemma Bolognesi as La signora Giulia

== Bibliography ==
- Parish, James Robert (1976). Film Directors Guide: Western Europe. Scarecrow Press.
