= The Hero of Venice =

1941 film directed by Carlo Campogalliani

- Directed by: Carlo Campogalliani
- Written by: Carlo Campogalliani; Alberto Spaini
- Starring: Gustav Diessl; Paola Barbara; Rossano Brazzi; Valentina Cortese
- Cinematography: Otello Martelli
- Edited by: Eraldo Da Roma
- Music by: Umberto Mancini
- Production company: Scalera Film
- Distributed by: Scalera Film
- Release date: 17 September 1941
- Running time: 85 minutes
- Country: Italy
- Language: Italian

The Hero of Venice (Italian: Il bravo di Venezia) is a 1941 Italian historical adventure film directed by Carlo Campogalliani and starring Gustav Diessl, Paola Barbara, Rossano Brazzi and Valentina Cortese.

It was shot at the Scalera Studios in Rome. The film's sets were designed by the art directors Gustav Abel and Amleto Bonetti.

== Plot ==
Marco Fuser, an outlaw. returns to Venice after many years. His son who works in the studio of a celebrated painter is unaware of his father's history. Arrested by the Doge's men, Marco agrees to become a bravo in the service of the city's ruler and kill his enemies. He enjoys some success at this, until he finds he has been tasked with killing his son.

== Cast ==
- Gustav Diessl as Marco Fuser, il bravo
- Paola Barbara as Leonora
- Valentina Cortese as Alina
- Rossano Brazzi as Guido Fuser
- Emilio Cigoli as Alvise Guoro
- Erminio Spalla as Franco
- Carlo Duse as Mastro Zaccaria
- Romano Calò as L'avogadore
- Giacomo Moschini as Il doge
- Giulio Paoli as Callisto
- Cesare Fantoni as Paolo Caliari, Il veronese
- Giuseppe Pierozzi as Il cerusico
- Angelo Dessy as Matteo
- Pina Gallini as Clotilde, la governante
- Achille Majeroni as L'inquisitore
- Giulio Tempesti as Sergio
- Amina Pirani Maggi as Una dama petegola al pozzo
- Emilio Petacci as Un amico di Leonora
- Renato Malavasi as Il secondo valletto di Alvise
- Alfredo Martinelli as Il primo valletto di Alvise
- Attilio Dottesio as Un pittore
- Giorgio Costantini as Gualtiero
- Eugenio Duse as Un servo di Leonora
- Alberto Sordi as Aiutante del Veronese

== Bibliography ==
- Montanaro, Carlo (2009). Damiani, Ludovica (ed.). Set in Venice: il cinema a Venezia : scatti, protagonisti, racconti (in Italian). Electa. ISBN 978-88-370-7056-4.
