= Siege of Giarabub =

Military engagement between Commonwealth and Italian forces during the Second World War

- Part of the Western Desert campaign of the Second World War
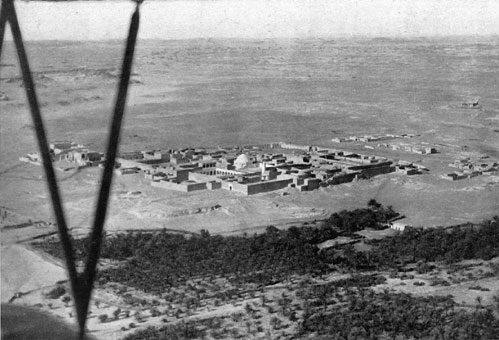
- An aerial view of the village of Giarabub (1941)
Date	25 December 1940 – 21 March 1941
Location	Giarabub, Libya 29°44′33″N 24°31′01″E
Result	Commonwealth victory

Belligerents
Australia; United Kingdom	Italy

Commanders and leaders
(Australia) George Wootten	(Kingdom of Italy) Salvatore Castagna (POW)

Strength
2 mechanised cavalry squadrons 1 augmented infantry battalion	2,100 (1,350 Italian & 750 Libyan troops)

Casualties and losses
17 killed, 77 wounded (final assault only)	250 killed 1,300 prisoners (Note: By the end of February, 620 prisoners had been taken.); 26 field guns
- Giarabub, Libya

The siege of Giarabub (now Jaghbub) in Libya, was an engagement between Commonwealth and Italian forces, during the Western Desert Campaign of the Second World War. In the aftermath of Operazione E, the invasion of Egypt by the Italian 10th Army (9–16 September 1940), Operation Compass (9–16 December) by the Western Desert Force (WDF), the Battle of Sidi Barrani and the pursuit of the 10th Army into Cyrenaica (16 December 1940 – 9 February 1941) the fortified Italian position at the Al Jaghbub Oasis was besieged by parts of the 6th Australian Division.

The 6th Australian Divisional Cavalry Regiment (6th ADCR) began the siege in December 1940 and isolated the oasis, leaving the Italian garrison dependent on the Regia Aeronautica. Air transport proved insufficient and hunger prompted many of the locally recruited troops to desert. After being reinforced by the 2/9th Australian Battalion and a battery of the 4th Royal Horse Artillery, the Australians attacked Giarabub on 17 March 1941 and the Italian garrison surrendered on 21 March.

== Background ==
=== Giarabub ===
Giarabub is an oasis in the Libyan Desert, 200 mi (320 km) south of Bardia and 40 mi (65 km) west of the border with Egypt. The Great Sand Sea of the Sahara Desert lies to the south, and the town is at the west end of salt marshes which go up to the Egyptian border. Giarabub is the westernmost in a line of oases on the edge of the Sahara into Egypt. In 1940, it was the southernmost Italian frontier post along the border with Egypt. (Note: The tomb of Sayyid Muhammad ibn Ali as-Senussi had been built at Giarabub and the oasis became the spiritual centre of resistance to European colonialism. The British forbade damage to the tomb of Senussi or the mosque.) Giarabub had been garrisoned by the Italians since 1925, after being ceded to Libya from Egypt by the British. In 1940, the garrison, commanded by Major Salvatore Castagna, consisted of 1,350 Italian and 750 Libyan soldiers, in four companies of border guards, five of Libyan infantry, a platoon Libyan engineers, an artillery company with fourteen 47 mm Cannone da 47/32 M35, four 80 mm Cannone da 77/28 and sixteen 20 mm Cannone-Mitragliera da 20/77 guns, signals engineers, a field hospital and a supply section. Gullies and re-entrants had been entrenched and barbed wire laid out around the village. Giarabub was at the end of a long supply line, made worse by a lack of vehicles. The Italian army lacked the mobility necessary to maintain outposts against opposition and could deliver only a small amount of supplies by air.

=== 6th Australian Divisional Cavalry ===
On 2 December 1940, B Squadron, 6th Australian Divisional Cavalry Regiment (6th ADCR) of the 6th Australian Division, Second Australian Imperial Force, was sent by the Western Desert Force (WDF) to Siwa oasis in Egypt, about 40 mi (65 km) east of Giarabub, to relieve a British force which had been there since September. The 6th ADCR should have had Vickers light tanks and Bren carriers but few were available and those that were proved mechanically unreliable in the desert. A Squadron got the armoured vehicles, while B and C squadrons were equipped with 15 cwt and 30 cwt (750 and 1,500 kg) lorries. On 11 December, after a week of patrols, a raid was mounted by B Squadron on Garn-el-Grein, 40 mi (65 km) north of Giarabub. The Australians were outgunned and withdrew, after Italian infantry in trucks and three Italian fighter aircraft arrived. On 14 December, B Squadron ambushed and destroyed a convoy near Fort Maddalena. The Australians patrolled to reconnoitre and isolate Giarabub, ready for an attack. On 31 December, 6th ADCR suffered its first losses when a patrol was forced to retreat after coming under artillery fire, with two men killed and three vehicles destroyed.

== Prelude ==
=== Siege ===
On 20 December, C Squadron conducted a secret reconnaissance of the outer defences of Giarabub. On 24 December, part of B Squadron attacked and captured an outpost at Ain Melfa, at the east end of the Giarabub salt marshes and used it as an advanced post. With the capture of the El Qaseibieya, well to the south-west fringe of the marshes, the Australians dominated the west end of the area. On 25 December, a reconnaissance in force by C Squadron was met with artillery-fire and air attacks. The following night, a raid on an Italian gun position was forced to withdraw after being detected; one man was captured. On 8 January 1941, a relief convoy was destroyed by the Royal Air Force (RAF) near Giarabub. This was the last Italian attempt to supply the oasis by land, after the defeat of the 10th Army in Operation Compass and its withdrawal from Cyrenaica.

The Regia Aeronautica (Royal Italian Air Force) made several attempts to supply the oasis by air but on 4 January, four 25-pounder field guns arrived at Siwa; on 9 January, the guns bombarded the Italian airstrip at Giarabub, damaging a transport aircraft and silencing two field guns. Airdrops of supplies were insufficient to feed the garrison. Libyan troops began to abandon their posts and by the end of February, 620 had been captured; the regular troops held on. The 6th ADCR had observed and harassed the oasis defenders but did not have the strength to attack the position. An advanced landing ground was established by the RAF beyond Siwa but a lack of aircraft made it redundant. Small Italian supply drops continued but rations for the garrison were drastically reduced.

=== Commonwealth preparations ===
Brigadier George Wootten, commander of the 18th Australian Infantry Brigade in the 6th Australian Division, was ordered to Giarabub but a lack of transport restricted the operation to a reinforced battalion, which had to end the siege in ten days. Wootten Force was assembled from the 2/9th Australian Infantry Battalion, reinforced by an infantry company from 2/10th Australian Infantry Battalion, a composite mortar platoon, a composite machine-gun platoon, an anti-aircraft platoon (all from the rest of the Brigade) and a battery of the 4th Regiment, Royal Horse Artillery (4th RHA) with twelve 25-pounder field guns. Wootten Force had no air support, little ammunition and no tanks. The Australians reconnoitred the Giarabub defences on 12 and 16 March, finding a track across the southern marshes and a gap in the frontier wire large enough for vehicles. An Italian force in trucks tried to outflank the reconnaissance party and were driven off by artillery--fire.

The heights south of the town were judged to be crucial to the Italian defence and B Squadron was ordered to take the Italian observation post (later named Wootten House) and advance north-west along the track toward Giarabub. B Squadron took Wootten House unopposed on 17 March, by 6:00 a.m. and then ambushed two lorries in which two Italians were killed, three wounded and 15 taken prisoner. (An Italian officer volunteered information of the oasis defences.) The squadron pressed on for 4.3 mi (7 km) and captured Daly House, the last post before Giarabub. The Australians were forced back by artillery fire and the post re-occupied, Breda cannons at the post being used to keep the Australians at a distance. On 19 March Wootten ordered an attack by two companies along the southern track to re-take Daly House and to drive the Italians back to the last line of the main Giarabub defences, to gain a good jumping-off position to attack the southern heights. Two 25-pounders were pulled through the marsh behind the infantry through heavy going to Daly House, which delayed the attackers until 3:00 p.m.

The post was unoccupied and artillery and machine-gun fire from the town was inaccurate. The Australians pressed on and occupied the Tamma Heights south-east of the oasis against little opposition; 13 Platoon was sent to Ship Hill at the east end of the heights, to provide covering fire, while the other two platoons advanced towards the town. By dark they had reached the south-eastern corner, where the wire had been covered by sand. Two sections advanced into the Italian position and found that Post 42 had been abandoned. On the arrival of 10 Platoon, the party occupied Post 36 and at 2:00 a.m. an Italian counter-attack was delivered and the Australians retired, suffering three wounded and having two men captured. By the morning of 20 March it had been decided to make the main attack in that area; supporting operations, a demonstration by the cavalry to the north and Post 76 on Brigadiers Hill had been taken by D Company, 2/10th Australian Battalion, which secured the flank of the attack and left the Italians unsure of the direction of the main attack.

=== Plan of attack ===
Two companies of the 2/9th Battalion were to attack, covered by fire from the mortars and machine-guns on Ship Hill and the 4th RHA. The attack was to capture the southern redoubt and then the other two companies would attack along the flanks of the redoubt and D Company, 2/10th Australian Infantry Battalion, would advance from Brigadiers Hill to open a track across the marsh and shorten the supply route. The cavalry would mount a subsidiary attack from the northern approach down Pipsqueak Valley, to take the airfield. A sandstorm blew up and clogged weapons which needed to be cleaned, then in the afternoon the storm abated but was sufficient to obscure the Australian assembly. There were exchanges of fire and from Ship Hill, the Australian machine-gunners could hit the Italian defences around the oasis and suppressed several positions. An Italian sniper stalked the machine-gun posts to no effect.

Patrols went forward after dark to observe Italian positions and make sure the Italians were not trying to slip away. An Australian listening post was met by an Italian patrol which withdrew when challenged. The Australians found the Italians in the redoubt "very nervous", firing and hurling grenades at shadows and then withdrew for the start of the attack. Zero hour was set at 5:15 a.m., when A Company was to attack on the right and C Company on the left, towards four knolls on the edge of the redoubt. When captured, A Company was to take the fifth knoll further back. The twelve guns of the 4th RHA would fire on the initial objectives, then lift onto the second objective; the machine-guns and mortars on Ship Hill were to give covering fire once the infantry advanced.

== Battle ==
Before zero hour, the lead companies assembled amidst another sandstorm. A Company advanced to within 50 m (55 yd) of the wire and was then bombarded by the British gunners who had underestimated the swirling wind and dropped short. The bombardment cut the line from the forward observer and the battery, which delayed an adjustment of range (shells also dropped short onto Ship Hill, causing one casualty). Twelve men of A Company were killed and twenty wounded; the survivors re-organised and began to move forward. A Platoon had avoided the worst of the bombardment but lost contact with the rest of A Company and continued the attack. C Company found that the wire had been cut and advanced to the first objective. The Italians appeared too stunned from the bombardment to offer much resistance and the Australians quickly reached the first line of knolls.

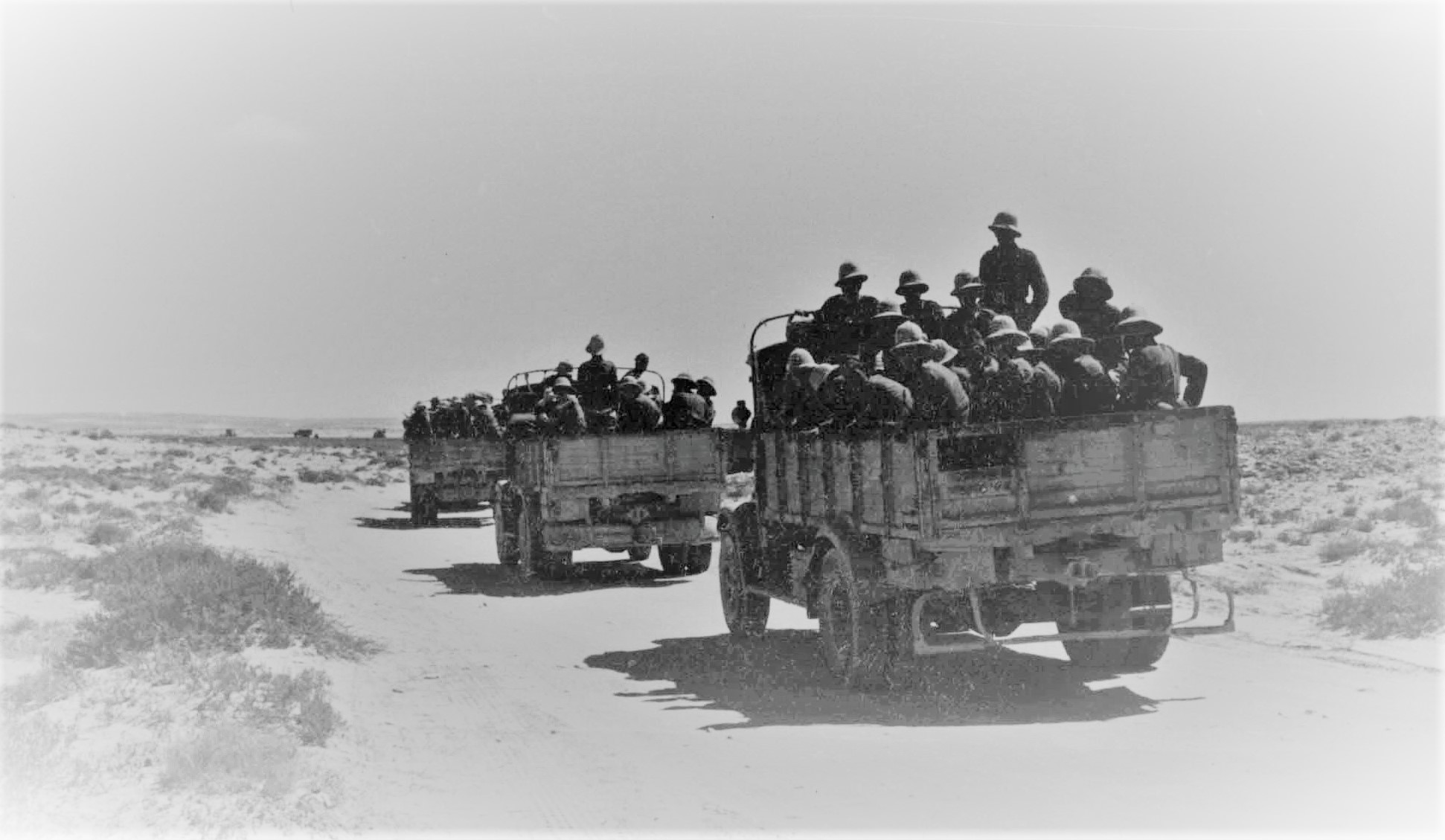
An Italian troop convoy on its way to relieve the Siege of Giarabub.

The Australians used many hand-grenades clearing dugouts and soon ran out. Some of the Australians had apparently been ordered to take no prisoners and were reluctant to advance, when it became clear that few Italians intended not to fight on. The Australians were ordered to encourage the Italians to surrender and by 7:26 a.m., the 2/9th Battalion had occupied the first four knolls. Due to the short shooting on A Company, a platoon of D Company, the battalion reserve, was sent forward to assist in the assault. The Italian defenders rallied, a mountain gun on the last knoll and Italian positions around the fort and plantation area opened fire and an attempt by an Australian platoon, to cross the flats into the town was repulsed. Fire of the mortars and machine-guns on Ship Hill and from a machine-gun detachment with A Company, covered the Australians as they captured the fifth knoll, just after 9:00 a.m.

Prisoners said that the garrison had not eaten for two days or nights. B Company on the left flank had advanced and re-gained contact with battalion HQ at 10:00 a.m. In the north, the cavalry diversion down Pipsqueak Valley to the airfield began at 6:15 a.m., an hour after the attack on the southern redoubt had commenced. B and C Squadrons advanced to occupy high ground on either side of the valley, with little Italian resistance except at the Egbert feature, which was bombarded and overrun. By 9:00 a.m. the cavalry were on the first objective, an east–west line through Egbert. D Company advanced through the cultivated area north-east of the redoubt into the town but a minefield, spotted earlier by an RAF Lysander crew, took a long time to clear. At 11:25 a.m., the 2/9th Battalion advanced into the town and found the mosque intact. By midday the Australians had entered the fort and ended the siege. After just two days the Australians withdrew from Giarabub, because of the Italo-German advance on El Agheila.

== Aftermath ==
=== Analysis ===
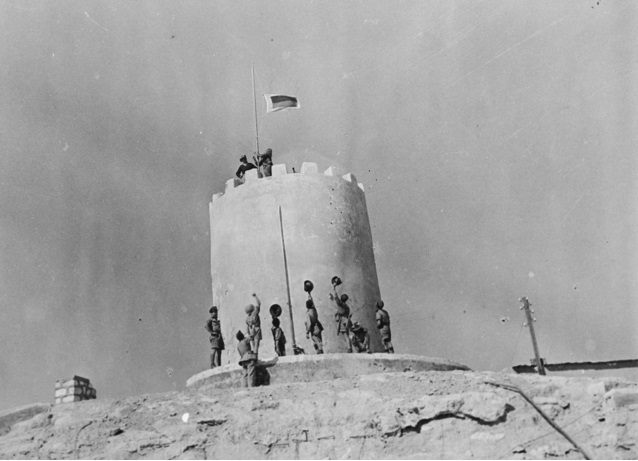
Australian soldiers from the 2/9th Battalion hoist a flag of the Unit Colour Patch over the Giarabub fort.

On 17 March, Erwin Rommel had congratulated the garrison on its defence and promised that they would be relieved and on 24 March, Italo-German forces occupied El Agheila. The resistance of the Italian troops was greatly celebrated by the Fascist regime to mitigate the calamity in Cyrenaica. The Italian and Commonwealth forces had fought for three months on the edge of the Sahara, enduring large temperature variations, sandstorms, the defenders suffering a shortage of water and food. Differences in technical quality, leadership, training and supply had put the Italians at a permanent disadvantage to the besiegers. The Australians left behind a salvage party and withdrew from the oasis the next day, just before Operation Sonnenblume (24 March – 9 April), an Italo-German counter-offensive, which recaptured Cyrenaica. A few weeks later, the 18th Australian Brigade Group began its part in the long Siege of Tobruk; the 6th ADCR went east and took part in Operation Exporter (8 June – 14 July 1941), the British invasion of Syria and Lebanon. Giarabub lost its tactical importance and became a backwater, eventually being used as a staging post for the Desert Air Force.

=== Casualties ===
In the final assault, the 2/9th Battalion lost 17 killed and 77 wounded, while the Italians lost about 250 men killed, 1,300 prisoners (including Castagna, who sustained a head wound in the fighting) and 26 field guns.

== See also ==
- Film: Giarabub (1942)
- List of Australian military equipment of World War II
- List of British military equipment of World War II
- List of Italian military equipment in World War II
