= Eraldo Da Roma =

Italian film editor

Eraldo Da Roma (born Eraldo Judiconi, 1 March 1900 – 27 May 1981) was an Italian film editor best known for his work with Roberto Rossellini, Vittorio De Sica, and Michelangelo Antonioni.

== Life and career ==
Da Roma was born on 1 March 1900 in Rome, Italy. At a young age he attempted a singing career as a tenor, but in the early 1930s, De Roma began working in the film industry as an assistant film operator. His earliest film as an editor was L'eredità dello zio… buonanima (1934) directed by Amleto Palermi. He adopted his 'pseudonym in the 1940s in the credits of some Goffredo Alessandrini's films.

Da Roma's reputation as an editor came after World War II, when he became known as "the neorealist editor" because of his collaborations with Roberto Rossellini and Vittorio De Sica in films such as Bicycle Thieves, Germany, Year Zero, Rome, Open City, Umberto D., Paisan, and Miracle in Milan.

During his career, Da Roma also worked with Michelangelo Antonioni, Gillo Pontecorvo, Sergio Leone, Nicholas Ray, Luigi Zampa, Antonio Pietrangeli, Dino Risi, Mauro Bolognini, and Christian-Jaque.

Da Roma was the uncle of the distinguished film editor Nino Baragli. He died on 27 May 1981.

== Selected filmography ==
- Territorial Militia (1935)
- Lohengrin (1936)
- Thirty Seconds of Love (1936)
- The Ferocious Saladin (1937)
- It Was I! (1937)
- All of Life in One Night (1938)
- The Count of Brechard (1938)
- Star of the Sea (1938)
- The Sons of the Marquis Lucera (1939)
- Father For a Night (1939)
- Angelica (1939)
- Lucrezia Borgia (1940)
- Bridge of Glass (1940)
- The White Ship (1941)
- The Hero of Venice (1941)
- A Pilot Returns (1942)
- Captain Tempest (1942)
- The Lion of Damascus (1942)
- Giarabub (1942)
- Girl of the Golden West (1942)
- The Man with a Cross (1943)
- The Innocent Casimiro (1945)
- The Tyrant of Padua (1946)
- The Devil's Gondola (1946)
- Biraghin (1946)
- The Great Dawn (1947)
- Be Seeing You, Father (1948)
- The Man with the Grey Glove (1948)
- Alarm Bells (1949)
- That Ghost of My Husband (1950)
- Mamma Mia, What an Impression! (1951)
- Rome-Paris-Rome (1951)
- A Thief in Paradise (1952)
- Umberto D. (1952)
- Mizar (Sabotaggio in mare) (1954)
- March's Child (1957)
- Engaged to Death (1957)
- The Friend of the Jaguar (1959)
- Dreams Die at Dawn (1961)
