= Sul ponte dei sospiri =

1953 film by Antonio Leonviola

- Directed by: Antonio Leonviola
- Produced by: Enrico Bomba
- Cinematography: Aldo Giordani
- Music by: Carlo Innocenzi
- Release date: 1953
- Country: Italy
- Language: Italian

Sul ponte dei sospiri is a 1953 Italian adventure film. It is based on characters created by Michel Zévaco.

== Cast ==
- Frank Latimore as Captain Vessillo
- Maria Frau as Bianca Spada
- Massimo Girotti as Marco Spada
- Françoise Rosay as Dama di Sant'Agata
- Eduardo Ciannelli as Inquisitore
- Luciana Vedovelli as Nerissa Fornier
- Carlo Micheluzzi as Il Doge
- Gisella Sofio as Barberina
- Lauro Gazzolo as Il banchiere

== See also ==
- The Avenger of Venice (1964)
