= Alfredo Varelli =

Italian actor (1914–1996)

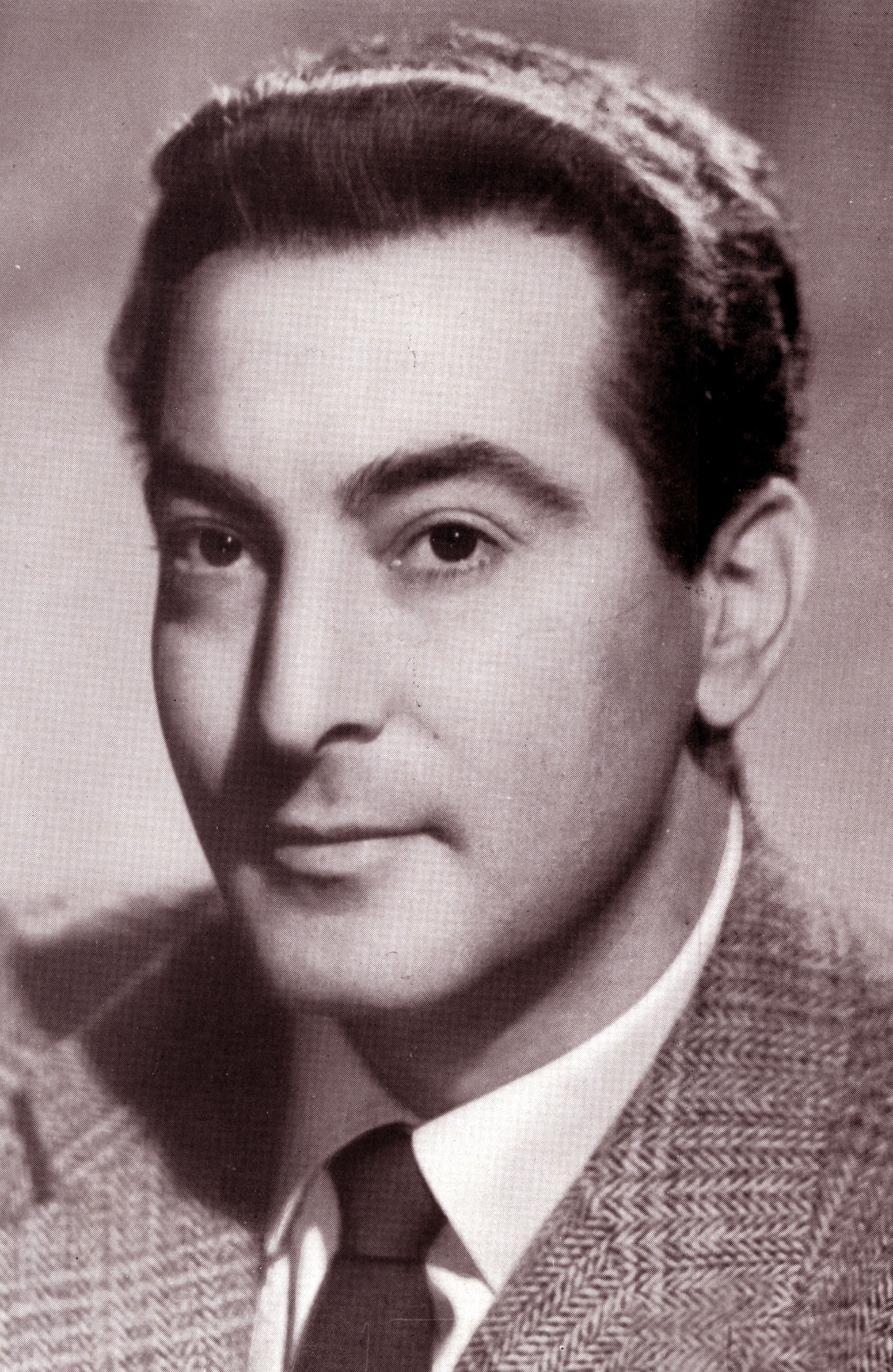
- Varelli in 1954
- Born: Alfredo Ciavarella; 31 August 1914; Saracinesco, Lazio, Italy
- Died: 18 August 1996 (aged 81); Rome, Italy
- Other name: Alfredo Ciavarella
- Occupation: Actor
- Years active: 1934–1996

Alfredo Varelli (born Alfredo Ciavarella, 31 August 1914 – 18 August 1996) was an Italian film actor whose career spanned more than six decades. He debuted in Alessandro Blasetti's 1934 film Vecchia guardia. Varelli played a leading role in the 1942 historical drama The Jester's Supper, but most of his work was post-Second World War. He is also known for playing Lucan in Quo Vadis (1951). His last role was in the film Roseanna's Grave, released posthumously in 1997.

Varelli died in Rome on 18 August 1996, at the age of 81.

== Selected filmography ==
- Vecchia guardia (1935)
- Giuseppe Verdi (1938) – Un ammiratore di Verdi al caffè
- Inventiamo l'amore (1938) – Il secondo giocatore di biliardo (uncredited)
- Crispino e la comare (1938)
- I, His Father (1939) – Un amico di Radesio
- Follie del secolo (1939) – Martin, il cameriere del conte
- The Secret Lover (1941) – Un amico di Renata
- L'amore canta (1941) – Il giovane Longo
- The Jester's Supper (1942) – Gabriello Chiaramantesi
- Fedora (1942) – Valeriano (uncredited)
- Measure for Measure (1943) – Il duca Vincenzo / il frate
- Vivere ancora (1945)
- All'ombra della gloria (1945) – Federico
- Fear No Evil (1945) – Marco, il pastore
- L'angelo e il diavolo (1946) – Giorgio Guarnelli
- The Devil's Gondola (1946) – Paolo Venier
- The Tyrant of Padua (1946) – Rodolfo degli Ezzelini
- L'apocalisse (1947)
- The Earth Cries Out (1949) – Josef
- Love and Poison (1950) – Egidio d'Averna
- Cavalcade of Heroes (1950) – Luciano Manara
- The Beggar's Daughter (1950)
- The Count of Saint Elmo (1951) – Don Paolo
- Quo Vadis (1951) – Lucan, poet in Nero's court [dubbed]
- Tizio, Caio, Sempronio (1951) – Lentulo
- Stranger on the Prowl (1952) – The Neighborhood Patrolman
- I, Hamlet (1952) – Jensen
- The Man from Cairo (1953) – Prof. H. M. Crespi
- The Pagans (1953) – Pope Clement VII
- Buon viaggio pover'uomo (1953) – Padre Antonio
- Non vogliamo morire (1954) – Louis
- Tripoli, Beautiful Land of Love (1954) – Lieutenant
- Io, Caterina (1957) – Cardinale Noellet
- Orizzonte infuocato (1957)
- Sheba and the Gladiator (1959) – Vithos
- The Night of the Great Attack (1959) – Nicola Renzi, 'Mezzanotte'
- Ben-Hur (1959) – Physician's Assistant (uncredited)
- The Siege of Syracuse (1960) – Kriton
- Colossus and the Amazon Queen (1960) – Mercante #1
- The Giants of Thessaly (1960) – Argus
- Duel of Champions (1961) – Sabinus
- Pontius Pilate (1962) – Giuseppe d'Arimatea
- Hemingway's Adventures of a Young Man (1962) – Father Ben (uncredited)
- The Eye of the Needle (1963) – Maioli
- Vino, whisky e acqua salata (1963)
- The Cavern (1964)
- Last Plane to Baalbek (1964) – Major Fwad
- Die Letzten drei der Albatross (1965) – Medizinmann Namu
- Seven Dollars on the Red (1966) – 1st Sheriff
- Assassination (1967) – Morrison
- Commissariato di notturna (1974)
- The Assisi Underground (1985) – The Monsignore
- The Belly of an Architect (1987) – Julio
- Roseanna's Grave (1997) – Shoe Shop Owner (final film role)

== Bibliography ==
- Reich, Jacqueline & Garofalo, Piero. Re-viewing Fascism: Italian Cinema, 1922–1943. Indiana University Press, 2002.
