= Be Seeing You, Father =

1948 film directed by Camillo Mastrocinque

- Directed by: Camillo Mastrocinque
- Written by: Marcello Marchesi; Vittorio Metz; Fulvio Palmieri
- Produced by: Lorenzo Pegoraro
- Starring: Gino Bechi; Mariella Lotti; Silvana Pampanini
- Cinematography: Václav Vích
- Edited by: Eraldo Da Roma
- Music by: Nino Rota
- Production company: Pegoraro Film
- Distributed by: Paramount Italiana
- Release date: 13 September 1948
- Running time: 85 minutes
- Country: Italy
- Language: Italian

Be Seeing You, Father (Italian: Arrivederci, papà!) is a 1948 Italian period comedy film directed by Camillo Mastrocinque and starring Gino Bechi, Mariella Lotti and Silvana Pampanini. The film's sets were designed by the art director Ottavio Scotti. The film was a breakthrough for Pampanini, who outshone the more established female star Lotti and rapidly gained appeal at the box office.

== Synopsis ==
The film takes place in the nineteenth century. Two as yet unborn children are allowed to select their future parents. They choose the daughter of a general and a young opera singer, but attempts to bring them together are far from simple.

== Cast ==
- Gino Bechi as Stevano Mai
- Mariella Lotti as Daniela Beauville
- Silvana Pampanini as Chornette
- Nino Besozzi as Tetriaca
- Nico Pepe as Il principe
- Guglielmo Barnabò as Generale Beauville
- Marcella Rovena as Zia Gertrude
- Galeazzo Benti as Il 'contino'
- Nerio Bernardi as Bernardine – il critico
- Amina Pirani Maggi as Nanna – la governante
- Augusto Di Giovanni as Il maggiordomo
- Guido Tomasini as Phanton
- Anna Maestri as La cameriera negra

== Bibliography ==
- Chiti, Roberto & Poppi, Roberto. Dizionario del cinema italiano: Dal 1945 al 1959. Gremese Editore, 1991.
- Gundle, Stephen. Fame Amid the Ruins: Italian Film Stardom in the Age of Neorealism. Berghahn Books, 2019.
