= Loredana (actress) =

Italian film and stage actress

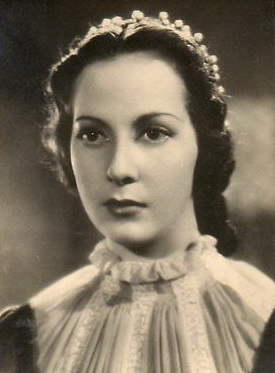
- Born: Loredana Padoan; 19 March 1924; Venice, Italy
- Died: 18 January 2016 (aged 91); Bologna, Italy

Loredana Padoan (19 March 1924 – 18 January 2016), best known just as Loredana, was an Italian film and stage actress.

== Life and career ==
Born in Venice, after completing her scuola magistrale studies, Loredana enrolled at several acting schools, determined to pursue a career as an actress.

Following several secondary roles, she had her breakout in 1942, with the lead role in the drama film La signorina. She later specialized in adventure films and melodramas. She significantly slowed her activities after the war, until her marriage to a Roman antique dealer and her subsequent retirement in the late 1940s. She died on 18 January 2016, at the age of 91.

== Selected filmography ==
- Department Store (1939)
- The Birth of Salome (1940)
- The King's Jester (1941)
- Idyll in Budapest (1941)
- La signorina (1942)
- Forbidden Music (1942)
- The Son of the Red Corsair (1943)
- Measure for Measure (1943)
- La Fornarina (1944)
- The Devil's Gondola (1946)
- Immigrants (1948)
