= Salvatore Castagna =

Italian officer during World War II

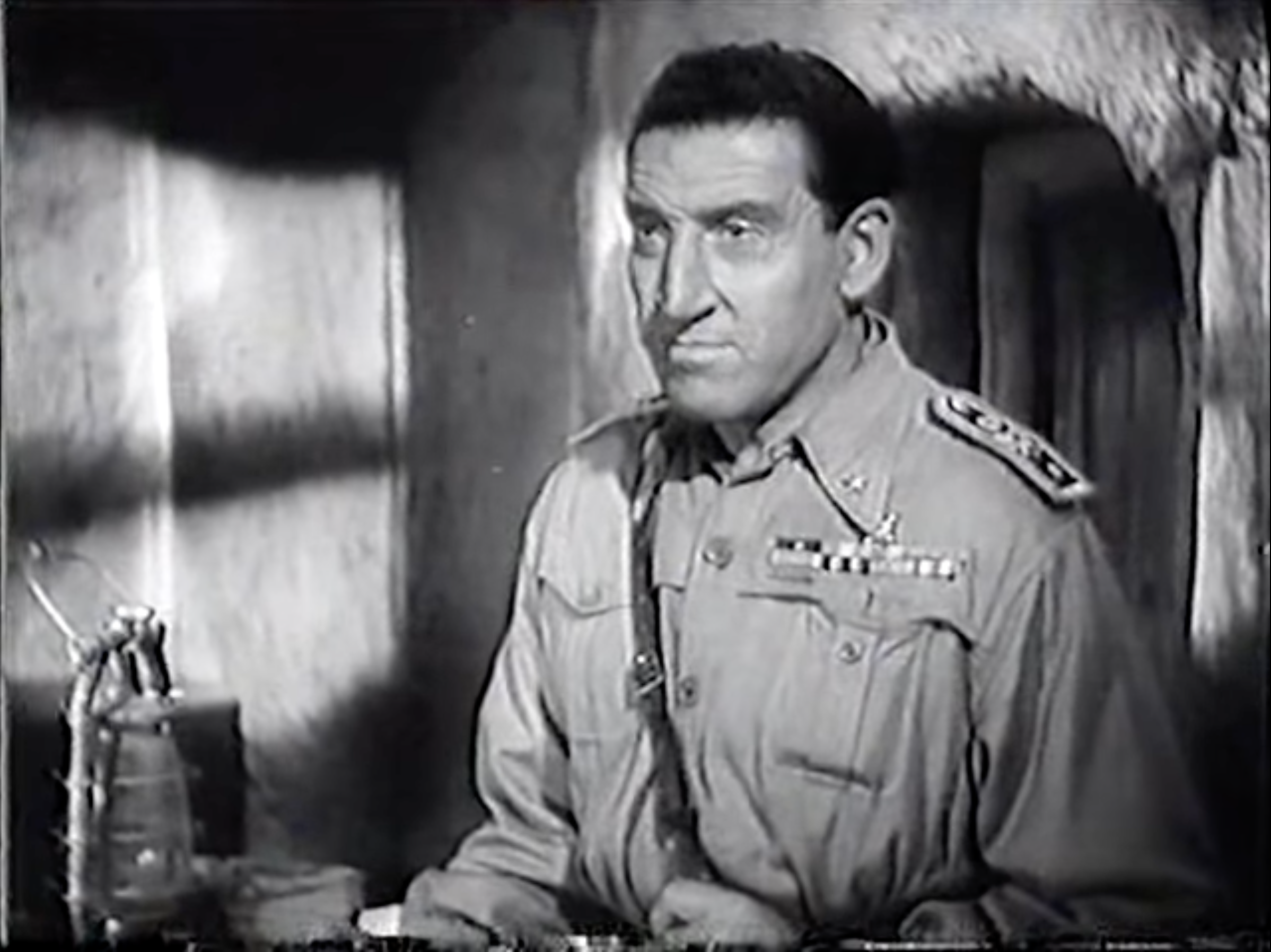
- Carlo Ninchi portrays Salvatore Castagna in the movie Giarabub
- Born: 14 January 1897; Caltagirone, Kingdom of Italy
- Died: 3 February 1977 (aged 80); Rome, Italy
- Military career
- Allegiance: Kingdom of Italy; Italy
- Branch: Royal Italian Army; Italian Army
- Rank: Major general
- Commands: Yefren garrison Bardia garrison Giarabub garrison Catania Military Zone
- Conflicts: World War I; Battles of the Isonzo; Battle of Vittorio Veneto; Pacification of Libya; World War II; Siege of Giarabub
- Awards: Silver Medal of Military Valor; War Merit Cross (twice); Military Order of Savoy; Order of the Crown of Italy; Colonial Order of the Star of Italy

Salvatore Castagna (Caltagirone, 14 January 1897 – Rome, 3 February 1977) was an officer in the Royal Italian Army during World War II, most notable for his leadership during the siege of Giarabub. After the war he became a general in the postwar Italian Army.

== Biography ==
Salvatore Castagna was born in Caltagirone, in the province of Catania, on 14 January 1897. At the outbreak of the First World War he enlisted as a volunteer in the Royal Italian Army, with the rank of second lieutenant. In November 1915 he received his baptism of fire on Mount Civaron (Valsugana), being promoted to lieutenant for the courage shown in action, and in 1917 he was awarded the Silver Medal of Military Valor for an action on the Karst Plateau. A few days before the end of the war, on 26 October 1918, he was wounded in the head while fighting on Monte Grappa.

After the First World War, Castagna remained in the Army, taking part in the pacification of Tripolitania in the 1920s in the ranks of the Cacciatori d'Africa. In 1937, with the rank of major, he returned there as commander of the garrison of Yefren, then of Bardia and finally of Giarabub (Jaghbub), an oasis in the Western Desert surrounded by dunes, 50 kilometers from the Egyptian border and 300 from the sea, where he still was at the start of the Second World War.

Giarabub was the last Italian stronghold in Cyrenaica during Operation Compass, the first British offensive in North Africa in which the Tenth Army was routed and annihilated. Cut off by the Allied advance in December 1940, Castagna and his garrison of 750 Libyans (most of whom deserted during the siege) and 1,350 Italians held out for three months before being overwhelmed by the final Australian assault on 21 March 1941. The heroic resistance of the Giarabub garrison, for which Castagna and his men were commended by Erwin Rommel, was greatly exploited by Fascist propaganda, with a 1942 film (in which Castagna was played by Carlo Ninchi) and a song (La sagra di Giarabub) being made to celebrate the defenders. Castagna, who had been promoted to colonel during the siege, was wounded in the head during the final assault, captured and taken to a British hospital in Palestine and then, after recovery, to a prisoner-of-war camp in India, near Bombay, where he remained until well after the end of the war. He was only repatriated in late 1946, arriving in Italy on 23 November, and learning that both his parents had died while waiting for his return.

He continued his career in the Army, being promoted to brigadier general and appointed military commander of the Catania area, then settled permanently in Rome and retired with the rank of major general. He died at age eighty at the Celio military hospital on 3 February 1978.
