= The Red Cloak =

1955 film

- Argentine poster
- Directed by: Giuseppe Maria Scotese
- Written by: Jacopo Corsi; Pierre Kast; Riccardo Pazzaglia; Albino Principe; France Roche; Guglielmo Santangelo
- Produced by: Albino Principe; Elios Vercelloni
- Starring: Patricia Medina; Fausto Tozzi; Jean Murat; Bruce Cabot
- Cinematography: Bitto Albertini
- Edited by: Renzo Lucidi
- Music by: Gino Marinuzzi Jr.
- Production companies: Centro Cinema; Franca Film; Trio Film
- Release date: 17 September 1955
- Running time: 102 minutes
- Countries: France; Italy
- Languages: Italian; English

The Red Cloak (Italian: Il mantello rosso) is a 1955 French-Italian historical adventure film directed by Giuseppe Maria Scotese and starring Patricia Medina, Fausto Tozzi and Jean Murat.

== Cast ==
- Patricia Medina as Laura Lanfranchi
- Fausto Tozzi as Luca de Bardi
- Jean Murat as Cosimo, il capitano del popolo
- Bruce Cabot as Capitano Raniero d'Anversa
- Colette Deréal
- Guy Mairesse as il Guercio
- Lyla Rocco as Stella
- Domenico Modugno as Saro
- Nyta Dover
- Jean-François Calvé
- Aldo Pensa
- Erminio Spalla
- Franco Caruso
- Eduardo de Santis as Capitano dei Guelfi
- Jeanne Fusier-Gir
- Giorgio Gandos
- Giacomo Rossi Stuart
- Franco Fantasia
- Andrea Fantasia
- Giulio Battiferri
- Carlo Marrazzini
- Edoardo Davila

== Bibliography ==
- Kinnard, Roy & Crnkovich, Tony . Italian Sword and Sandal Films, 1908–1990. McFarland, 2017.
