= Jaghbub =

Jaghbub الجغبوب
- Village
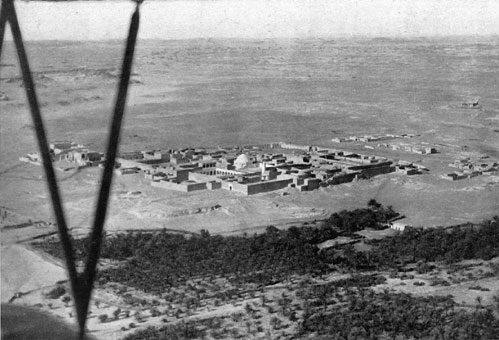

- Location in Libya
- Coordinates: 29°44′33″N 24°31′01″E
- Country: Libya
- Region: Cyrenaica
- District: Butnan
- Elevation: −33 ft (−10 m)

Population (2023)
  - Total: 2,960
- Time zone: UTC+2 (EET)

Jaghbub (Arabic: الجغبوب; Italian: Giarabub) is a remote desert village in the Al Jaghbub Oasis in the eastern Libyan Desert. It is geographically closer to the Egyptian town of Siwa than to any Libyan town of note. The oasis is located in Butnan District and was the administrative seat of the Jaghbub Basic People's Congress. The town remains largely obscure, with its ancient history and secrets still awaiting discovery by archaeologists. Despite its substantial colonial past, the town holds a complex and multifaceted history, shaped by numerous influences over the centuries, each contributing to its unique character and legacy. The town was the birthplace of Idris of Libya on 12 March 1890.

== Geography ==
The Jaghbub oasis is located in a deep depression that extends below sea level. This depression, an area lower than the surrounding region, reaches to about -10 m. The basin of the region is made up of a thin layer of sandy clay. The sand here has the ability to accumulate into waves.

== History ==
The name Jaghbub originates from the Toubou (Gara'an) language and is a distorted form of its original name, Yaghbibou (also rendered as Yaghbou). Jaghbub is one of the ancient oases of the Toubou. The first syllable, Jagh, was originally spelled Yagh, with alternative forms such as Yaga as well as Yagabi. It denotes "house." While Yaghbi is often interpreted simply as "house," it holds a deeper significance in the Toubou cultural and linguistic context—referring to a dwelling of high status, associated with authority, prestige and social rank. The element bi, as found in Yagabi, is derived from Bu, which literally means "big". However, in this context, it conveys broader meanings such as importance, reverence, influence and greatness. The second part of the name, bub, is a corrupted amalgamation of the elements Yagh-bi-bu. The term Bu (also spelled Bo or Bou) indeed translates as "big", but its connotation here extends beyond physical size to signify greatness in social and cultural terms. Thus, Jaghbub is a linguistic corruption of Yagabi-Bou and simply means "great house".

Muhammad ibn Ali as-Senussi founded the Senussi order in Mecca in 1837. At that time, Mecca was part of the Ottoman Empire. He began preaching a reformist Islamic message, emphasizing a return to the fundamentals of Islam and opposing both Ottoman corruption and European colonialism. After facing resistance from Ottoman authorities and others, he moved westward and eventually settled in Cyrenaica (eastern Libya) around 1840, where the movement grew in strength. Jaghbub became the spiritual and administrative center of the movement, eventually emerging as the main base of operations for the Senussites by 1856.

=== Senussi origins ===
In the year of its founding, Muhammad ibn Ali as-Senussi established an important Zawiya there. The Encyclopedia of Africa points to him being the founder of Senussi movement in Jaghbub. As a result, Jaghbub became the metaphorical capital for the Senussi movement, and remained so from 1856 to 1895. The role of Jaghbub as a capital was demonstrated through how regional Senussi sheiks would meet annually in Jaghbub to report and discuss the situation at the zawiyas they ran. Senussi ended up dying in Jaghbub in 1859. Jaghbub became particularly important for the Senussi movement because its location and nomads in the region that were attracted to the Senussi message. Running Senussi operations from Jaghbub also allowed their work to be disentangled from that of any particular tribe. Moreover, the town was along a pilgrimage route to Mecca, and additional sources point to Jaghbub being founded along a trade route. The Senussis would actively work there to spread their religious influence.

The Zawiya founded by Senussi became a site of Islamic intellectual learning and Senussi military training, including horseback training. It would draw in students all across North Africa. Notable figures, such as the poet Rajab Hamad Buhwaish al-Minifi, were educated in Jaghbub. In addition, Omar al-Mukhtar was provided with military training in Jaghbub as well. Moreover, Abd al-Mut'al would also stay in Jaghbub for some time.

In the 1880s Jaghbub was receiving smuggled weapons shipments from the Ottoman Empire through the Bedouin tribes. During this time, the Turkish governor of Awjala grew angry with how tribespeople were sending massive quantities of grain to Jaghbub as tribute to the Senussis when they often resisted paying the Ottoman Empire taxes.

Through the latter part of the 19th century, Jaghbub began to attract a small population of migrants escaping Ottoman expropriation of their property in Cyrenaica.

=== Before World War I ===
Both the Ottoman and British Empires laid claim on Jaghbub in the years before the First World War. Through the duration of the Italo-Turkish war, the British Empire considered Jaghbub to be British territory. By 1912, Jaghbub had reemerged as a center of Senussi power. This began diplomatic disputes between Britain and Italy over control of the town as the Senussis were actively resisting Italy from the town.

In a meeting between Enver Bey, Sayyid Ahmad, and other Ottoman officers at Jaghbub, the Ottoman officers decided to continue resistance against Italian forces, though they could only do so up to 1913.

In 1913, it was uncovered that Dr. Izzet-el-Gindi, sent by the Egyptian Khedive had been acting on behalf of the Italians in secret negotiations between the Khedive of Egypt and Italy to transfer Jaghbub to Italy. More specifically, the Khedive was discovered to have been bribed for doing this. Rodd would later note to the Italian government to stop using the Khedive for the negotiations. Robert Vansittart warned the Khedive that he would be removed from power if something like that were to happen again. Grey would note to an ambassador in London that Britain would not cede Jaghbub as a part of a deal.

=== During and after World War I ===
Sayyid arrested Al-Baruni and Hilal in a prison in Jaghbub after Hilal agreed to a plot rejected by Ahmad al-Sharif to get the Senussis to fight the British. However, in 1916 Sayyid Ahmad al-Sharif agreed to open an Ottoman front against the British, sending 500 troops through Jaghbub to occupy several oases.

The Italians were concerned by the possibility that British corporations might start building infrastructure in Jaghbub, which could counter Italian influence. In response, debates would begin to ensue over what to do about Jaghbub.

In 1920, Muhammad Idris bin Muhammad al-Mahdi as-Senussi was able to make a deal with Italy to make himself Amir of Cyrenaica and which would give autonomy to Jaghbub along with other towns. In return, they agreed to the Legge Fondamentale of Italy, to not tax locals beyond what was normal, and to disband their armies. However, they never followed through with disbanding their armies. These events occurred within the context of the background towards the start of the Second Italo-Senussi War.

=== Senussi Suppression ===
During Italy's suppression campaign and in the context of the Second Italo-Senussi War, Jahgbub became a target for being known to be a major center of rebel organization. Jaghbub had been known to be a conduit for cross border supply transfers for the Senussis from Egyptian sources.

As a result, a diplomatic situation arose between Italy and Egypt, with Italy claiming that Egypt was not supposed to own Jaghbub according to a map made around 1841. Amman has argued that Italian desire to control Jaghbub came from the desire to quell the Senussi movement, which would not be possible without controlling the city. Egypt repeatedly emphasized their concerns for not wanting to cede Jaghbub to Italy, citing multiple issues over potential Arab unrest in Egypt, concerns that they would be losing a strategic location, that the promise was made by the British during the First World War, and that the desire to quell the Senussis could be an excuse to demand other Egyptian oasis towns. From the British perspective, people like Fathi considered Jaghbub to be Egyptian lands from a French and a German map. However, Fathi was willing to trade Jaghbub for a piece of territory. As the diplomatic conflict persisted, Italy made their intentions to occupy Jaghbub through force clear.

Initially, the British were completely hostile to the idea of transferring Jaghbub to Italy, though they promised to not "encroach" on Italian lands. Complicating the situation was how the British had promised to transfer Jaghbub to Italian control in exchange for Italy ceding the Sallum region to Egypt, but under what treaty is unclear. A dissertation by Donnarumma argues this occurs within the context of Italy and Britain sharing the Mediterranean sea. Eventually, a treaty was signed between Italy and Egypt which transferred Jaghbub to Italy on December 6, 1925. This treaty was sometimes referred to as the treaty of Jaghbub. To avoid Bedouin arrest, the Egyptian government asked the Italians to respect the religion of the locals and to protect the grand Senussi's tomb. After the treaty was signed, debate persisted on whether the locals of Jaghbub would be able to choose their nationality. In their historical analysis, Rappas argues that the deal was agreed to by Britain to improve relations with Italy in an effort to check French power in Europe. Around the same year the treaty was signed, the capital for Senussi operations was moved from Jaghbub to Kufra.

After Italy retained control over Jaghbub, they began to construct the Frontier Wire, which was a 270 km long wall that stretched from the Mediterranean coastline all the way to Jaghbub. This wall was made in part from barbed wire. The construction of the wall allowed the Italians to control cross border movement supporting Alwad Ali and prevent rebel leaders, particularly Omar Mukhtar, from escaping into Egypt. Around early 1926, with the help of the Frontier Wire, the Italians were able to successfully occupy Jaghbub, quelling the Senussi armed movement. In 1928, Senussis flocked from Kufra as the Italians had managed to occupy the region, moving back to Jaghbub. By 1932, Jaghbub began to lose its prominence as a trading center.

=== World War II ===
The Siege of Giarabub was fought between Commonwealth and Italian forces during World War II. Italian and Libyan colonial troops led by Colonel Salvatore Castagna resisted a siege by mostly Australian troops for three months before being forced to surrender on 23 March 1941. The resistance of the Italian troops was celebrated by the fascist regime and used to minimize the military defeat in Cyrenaica.

=== Postwar ===
During WWII, questions arose over how to assign colonial territory of the Italian empire postwar. Though some suggestions were made to transfer Jaghbub back into Egyptian control as an autonomous province, an Egyptian ambassador to Britain and a British North African military leader were hesitant to do this out of fear of angering Arab populations and being perceived as harsh.

Italian oil company CORI, which was partnered with AGIP acquired a grant to purchase vast swaths of Libyan land southwest of Jaghbub, where it eventually struck oil.

=== Under the Libyan Arab Jamahiriya ===
During the 1977 war between Egypt and Libya, Jaghbub was the site of a prominent battle which killed 2000 people.

During Gaddafi's reign, the graves of historical figures in Jaghbub were targeted. The Senussi college and mosque there were ordered to be demolished in 1984. As a part of the demolition process, the bodies of Senussi and his brother in law were either excavated and dumped in the desert or were stolen. A news article written by Michel Cousins asserted that this move failed, as around 2011 pro-Senussi sentiment was likely the highest it had been since the 1960s.

== Historical sites and architecture ==
Cresti points to all of the religious historical sites in Jaghbub being destroyed in concert with the grave desecration of the Senussis ordered by Gaddafi. They also note that photos of these religious sites however can be obtained at the National Central Library of Rome.

The Zawiya in Jaghbub underwent significant redesign circa the 1870s, which changed its size, shape, and added a wall to the city. This wall had a distinct trapezoidal shape from an aerial view. The Qabba there, which housed the tombs of the grand Senussi and his family members, was ornamented with a large dome and was described by Cresti as being the iconic focus of the city. The tomb of the grand Senussi in particular was housed in gold-like covering. A minaret also used to be part of the religious complex. Cresti points to the source of the architectural design of the Qabba to being associated with revivalist-religious Egyptian architecture.

Old photos of the city show the presence of the existence of old windmills no longer in use. In addition, one of the structures in Jaghbub that utilized an arch was given a stucco decoration after Italy asserted control over the city.

== Historical controversy and disputes ==
It appears to be a critical and repeatedly mentioned narrative within secondary sources, and particularly in a dissertation by Ahmida that Senussi moved over to Jaghbub in 1856 in order to escape Ottoman surveillance or interference. However, Osman disputes this, arguing that Jaghbub's location in the path of camel caravan mecca pilgrimage route is why the Senussis chose it as a base of their operations. Yet Shibeika claimed this move was done in light of worsening relations with the Ottoman Empire. However, this was disputed by Minawi and Ladjal, arguing relations were improving between the Senussis and the Ottomans. Miwawi further elaborated on this situation by explaining that Mahdi Al-Senussi wanted to escape the challenge to authority he had over the Bedouin tribes presented by the kaymakamlik created in Jaghbub, which was operated by Tripoli administrators. Other sources have insisted that this escape was done to flee the conflicts that Senussi faced over his heretical views. Everd-Pritchard argued that the move to Jaghbub may have occurred since the Senussis did not consider the Ottomans to be the Caliphs of Islam. Vandewalle stands out among other sources for asserting that Jaghbub became a capital for Senussi operations beginning in 1855, and for asserting that the location was chosen to avoid French confrontation. Zalewski insisted that the initial move was done to avoid Ottoman, French, and Egyptian involvement in their affairs.

=== Senussi suppression ===
One source claims that the British directed the Italians to negotiate the border issue with the Egyptians themselves. However, seeing that British officials like Fathi also had an interest in the issue, more research and secondary sources are needed to clarify what is meant. Alternatively, this could be an outright contradiction in which one of the sources is incorrect.

There appears to be agreement that Jaghbub was promised to the Italians by the British, but under what treaty has been disputed. Donnarumma claims this promise was made under the treaty of London in return for transferring the Sallum area to Egypt. However, Ammann clarifies the town was promised under the Milner Scialoia agreement of 1920, with Milner and Sciaola agreeing to it because of the London pact.

=== Move away from Jaghbub ===
Some sources claim that the move away from Jaghbub was done to avoid disputes and situations with the Ottomans. However, other sources particularly stress this move was more the Senussis seeing greater opportunity to expand their influence from making this move. Klaus suggests part of this opportunity came from the desire to strengthen critical trade routes, which would have been difficult to do from Jaghbub.

The question of who or what made the transition of moving the Senussi capital from Jaghbub to Kufra in 1895 also remains disputed. Some sources credit the move to Sheikh al-Mahdi. However, Minawi stands out for implying the date of the move was 1896, and that mosque members incentivized the move to Kufra by moving there.

=== Length of the Fence ===
There was even variation between sources on the length of the fence. Vandewalle claimed that the fence was 300 km long. However, the majority of others point to the fence being 270 km long. One source that supports this assertion written by Michael Ebner claims the length of the fence to be 270 km long.

== Miscellaneous ==
=== Demographics ===
Jaghbub has grown from roughly 466 people in 1950, 884 in 1970, 2,220 people in 2000, to around 2,960 people with a median age of 29 as of 2023.

=== Food ===
Jaghbub was an oasis associated with providing dates to caravan travelers.

=== Exploration ===
In 1926, an Italian geographer and geologist Desai went to Jaghbub to learn more about geology and geography there. James Holland was the first documented American to have traveled to Jaghbub, where he took pictures of famous Senussi figures.

=== In popular culture ===
The construction of the fence was dramatized in the film Lion of the Desert. In addition, the movie Giarabub made in 1942 depicted the conquest of an Italian fort in Libya. Also, Giarabub is the subject of an Italian WW2 war song "La Sagra di Giarabub".

== See also ==
- List of North African airfields during World War II
- Butnan District
- Districts of Libya
- Al Jaghbub Oasis
- Bedouin

== Recommended readings ==
- Pargeter, Alison (September 2009). "Localism and radicalization in North Africa: local factors and the development of political Islam in Morocco, Tunisia and Libya". International Affairs. 85 (5): 1031–1044. doi:10.1111/j.1468-2346.2009.00845.x.
- Kane, Susan; Raynolds, William; Carrier, Sam (November 2017). "American Mission activities in Libya 2005–16: report". Libyan Studies. 48: 135–147. doi:10.1017/lis.2017.3. S2CID 133939683.
- Salem, Zenhom El-Said (December 2016). "Subsurface thermal regime to delineate the paleo-groundwater flow system in an arid area, Al Kufra, Libya". NRIAG Journal of Astronomy and Geophysics. 5 (2): 451–462. Bibcode:2016JAsGe...5..451S. doi:10.1016/J.Nrjag.2016.10.002. S2CID 132919496.
- Weisbrode, Kenneth (16 April 2009). "International Administration Between the Wars: A Reappraisal". Diplomacy & Statecraft. 20 (1): 30–49. doi:10.1080/09592290902813114. S2CID 153670593.
