= Ottavio Scotti =

Italian art director

- Born: 23 February 1904; Umago, Istria, Italy
- Died: 23 May 1975 (aged 71); Rome, Lazio, Italy
- Occupation: Art director
- Years active: 1937-1971

Ottavio Scotti (1904–1975) was an Italian art director. Scotti was born in Umago, which was then part of Italy but is today in Croatia. He worked on more than a hundred films during his career, including Orson Welles's Black Magic, which was shot at Cinecittà in Rome.

== Selected filmography ==
- Hurricane in the Tropics (1939)
- A Thousand Lire a Month (1939)
- The Castle Ball (1939)
- I, His Father (1939)
- Red Tavern (1940)
- Light in the Darkness (1941)
- The Little Teacher (1942)
- Fedora (1942)
- Invisible Chains (1942)
- A Little Wife (1943)
- The Devil's Gondola (1946)
- Bullet for Stefano (1947)
- Fatal Symphony (1947)
- The Man with the Grey Glove (1948)
- Be Seeing You, Father (1948)
- Chains (1949)
- Black Magic (1949)
- The Flame That Will Not Die (1949)
- The Count of Saint Elmo (1950)
- The Thief of Venice (1950)
- Women and Brigands (1950)
- Nobody's Children (1951)
- The Piano Tuner Has Arrived (1952)
- A Woman Has Killed (1952)
- Black Feathers (1952)
- Woman of the Red Sea (1953)
- Storms (1953)
- The Count of Saint Elmo (1953)
- Genoese Dragnet (1954)
- A Parisian in Rome (1954)
- Orient Express (1954)
- Sunset in Naples (1955)
- Carovana di canzoni (1955)
- The Prince with the Red Mask (1955)
- The White Angel (1955)
- The Wolves (1956)
- Toto and Marcellino (1958)
- È arrivata la parigina (1958)
- ...And the Wild Wild Women (1959)
- Siege of Syracuse (1960)
- Howlers in the Dock (1960)
- Letto a tre piazze (1960)
- La garçonnière (1960)
- The Mongols (1961)
- My Son, the Hero (1962)
- The Slave (1962)
- The Monk of Monza (1963)
- Castle of Blood (1964)
- Gideon and Samson (1965)
- The Almost Perfect Crime (1966)
- The Oldest Profession (1967)
- Web of the Spider (1971)

== Bibliography ==
- Richards, Jeffrey. Swordsmen of the Screen: From Douglas Fairbanks to Michael York. Routledge, 2014.
