= The Black Mask (1952 film) =

1952 film

Maschera nera
- Directed by: Filippo Walter Ratti
- Written by: Ugo Moretti; Filippo Walter Ratti
- Produced by: Emilio Scacciafratte
- Starring: Cesare Danova; Franca Marzi; Nino Pavese
- Cinematography: Carlo Carlini
- Production company: R.C.I.
- Distributed by: Distribuzione Intercine
- Release date: 11 April 1952
- Running time: 90 minutes
- Country: Italy
- Language: Italian

The Black Mask (Italian: Maschera nera) is a 1952 Italian historical adventure film directed by Filippo Walter Ratti and starring Cesare Danova, Franca Marzi and Nino Pavese. It earned a little over a hundred million lire at the box office.

== Synopsis ==
A mysterious masked horseman fights for justice for the poor.

== Cast ==
- Cesare Danova as Villeneuve
- Franca Marzi as Henriette
- Nino Pavese as Dupont
- Lia Di Leo as Hippolite
- Renato Chiantoni as Damprepois
- Gianna Baragli as Valentine
- Anna Maria Padoan as Louise
- Fedele Gentile
- Cesare Polesello
- Renato Lupi
- Luigi Pavese
- Ciro Berardi
- Eraldo Mori-Cristiani
- Mario Siletti
- André Hildebrand
- Alberto Sorrentino
- Diego Pozzetto
- Scilla Larso

== Bibliography ==
- Chiti, Roberto & Poppi, Roberto. Dizionario del cinema italiano: Dal 1945 al 1959. Gremese Editore, 1991.
