= Mariella Lotti =

Italian film actress (1919–2004)

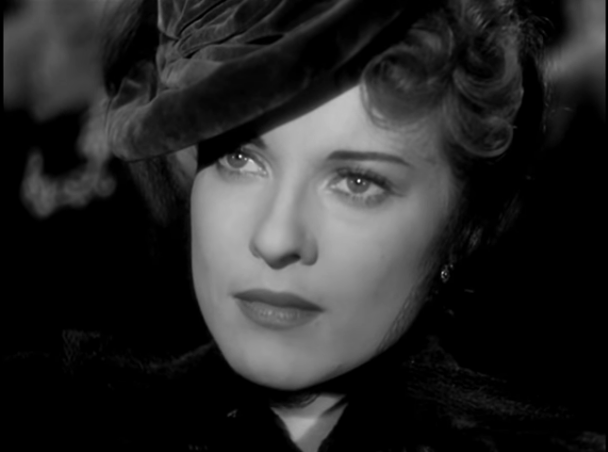
- Lotti in 1945
- Born: Maria Camilla Pianotti; 17 November 1919 (Note: Some sources say 18 November 1919, but the parish register states she was born before midnight.); Busto Arsizio, Varese, Kingdom of Italy
- Died: 18 December 2004 (aged 85); Paris, France
- Occupation: Actress
- Years active: 1939–1954

Mariella Lotti (born Maria Camilla Pianotti; 17 November 1919 – 18 December 2004) was an Italian film actress. Lotti made her film debut in 1939, and played leading ladies in a number of Fascist era and post-war films. She was one of many actors employed on the anthology film The Ten Commandments, made following the overthrow of Benito Mussolini. She made her final film Carmen in 1954. During the war she was involved in a passionate love story with King Michael of Romania.

Her sister Carola Lotti was also an actress.

== Filmography ==
- The Silent Partner (1939)
- I, His Father (1939)
- The Sons of the Marquis Lucera (1939)
- The Daughter of the Green Pirate (1940)
- Kean (1940)
- Inspector Vargas (1940)
- Il ponte dei sospiri (1940)
- Il signore della taverna (1940)
- Marco Visconti (1941)
- Il vetturale del San Gottardo (1941)
- Il cavaliere senza nome (1941)
- I mariti (Tempesta d'anime) (1941)
- Headlights in the Fog (1942)
- The Gorgon (1942)
- Disturbance (1942)
- Torrents of Spring (1942)
- Silenzio, si gira! (1943)
- Men of the Mountain (1943)
- Mater dolorosa (1943)
- Squadriglia Bianca (1944)
- Il fiore sotto gli occhi (1944)
- No Turning Back (1945)
- The Ten Commandments (1945)
- La freccia nel fianco (1945)
- Un giorno nella vita (1946)
- Canto, ma sottovoce... (1946)
- For the Love of Mariastella (1946)
- The Opium Den (1947)
- Life of Donizetti (1947)
- The Adventures of Pinocchio (1947)
- Il principe ribelle (1947)
- The Brothers Karamazov (1947)
- Guarany (1948)
- Be Seeing You, Father (1948)
- The Pirates of Capri (1949)
- The Devil in the Convent (1950)
- The Captain of Venice (1951)
- His Last Twelve Hours (1951)
- Leathernose (1952)
- What Price Innocence? (1952)
- Solo per te Lucia (1952)
- The Woman Who Invented Love (1952)
- La storia del fornaretto di Venezia (1952)
- The City Stands Trial (1952)
- Carmen (1953)
