= Questo amore ai confini del mondo =

- Directed by: Giuseppe Maria Scotese
- Written by: Ernesto Guida; Giuseppe Maria Scotese; Fausto Tozzi
- Starring: Antonio Cifariello; Dominique Wilms
- Cinematography: Humberto Peruzzi
- Music by: Armando Trovajoli
- Release date: 1960
- Running time: 96 minute
- Countries: Argentina; Italy
- Language: Spanish

Questo amore ai confini del mondo (Spanish: Casi al fin del mundo/ Un amor en el confín del mundo) is a 1960 Argentine-Italian film directed by Giuseppe Maria Scotese.

== Plot ==
In Terra del Fuoco, Françoise is having trouble adapting to her life as the wife of the rich breeder Claudio. She married him only out of necessity, and does not love him. Claudio offered her a new life. When she arrives at the "estancias", she spurs jealousy, especially in Claudio's old girlfriend Mecha.

During a party, Walter arrives, an adventurous man who quickly falls in love with Françoise, despite her being married. Mecha is also interested in Walter, who has suddenly decided to leave the "estancias". However, months later, he returns, and Françoise falls in love with him as well, but he leaves again. Françoise tries to forget about him and get closer to her husband.

Later, Françoise and Claudio go to a ferry, but Walter is there. Françoise and Walter try to escape together to Chile, while Mecha and Claudio chase after them. Mecha shoots at them, wounding Walter, but he manages to drag Françoise and him across the border. Claudio watches them leave.

== Cast ==
- Antonio Cifariello as Walter
- Dominique Wilms as Françoise
- Fausto Tozzi as Claudio
- Egle Martin as Mecha
