= Fausto Tozzi =

Italian actor

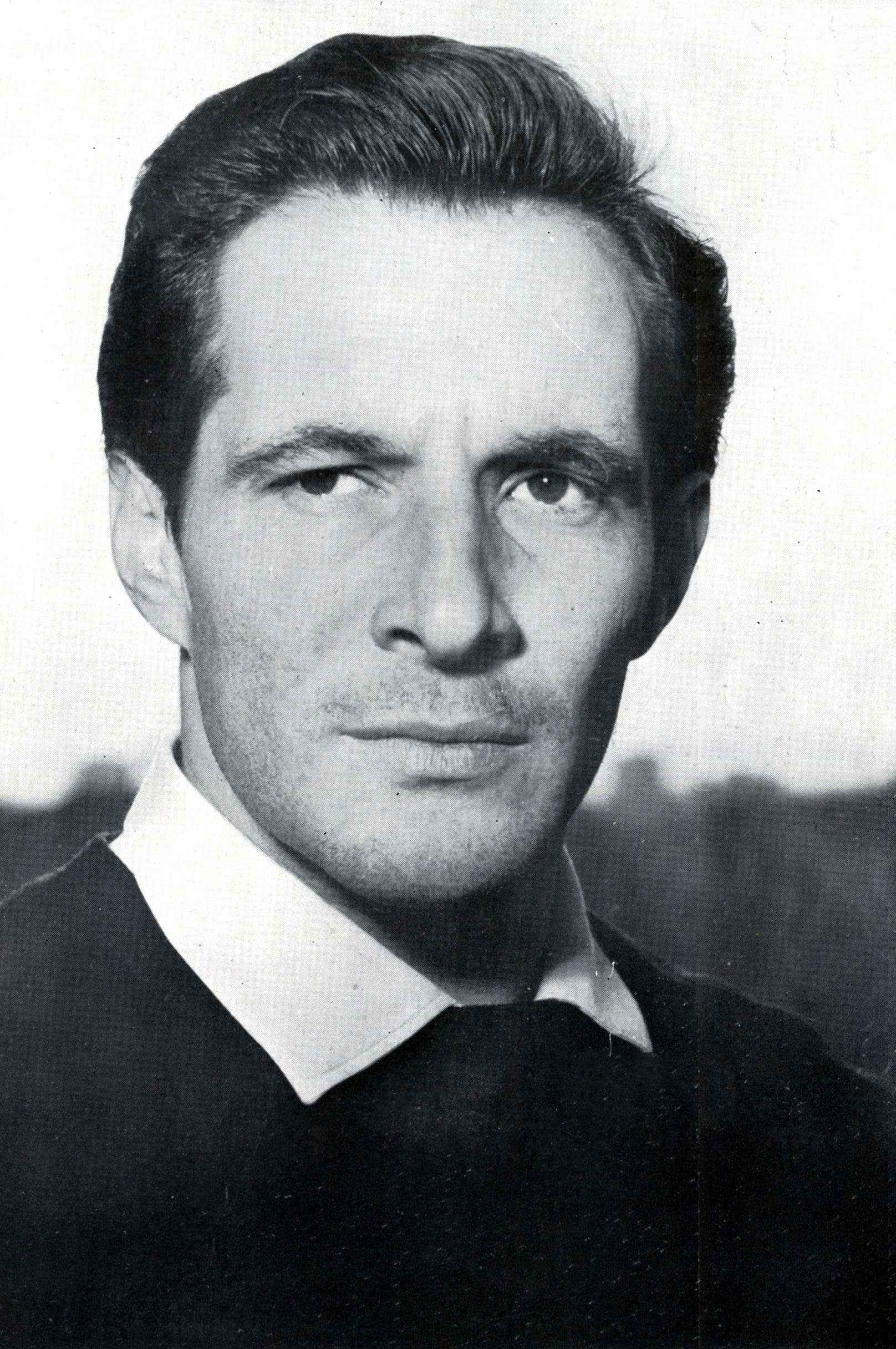
- Tozzi circa 1953
- Born: 29 October 1921; Rome, Italy
- Died: 10 December 1978 (aged 57); Rome, Italy
- Occupations: Actor; Screenwriter
- Years active: 1946–1978

Fausto Tozzi (29 October 1921 – 10 December 1978) was an Italian film actor and screenwriter. He appeared in 70 films between 1951 and 1978. He wrote the script for The Defeated Victor, which was entered into the 9th Berlin International Film Festival. He also directed one film, Trastevere.

== Life and career ==
Born in Rome, after graduating in accountancy Tozzi made several humble jobs, including peddler and bird taxidermist. He was introduced in the cinema industry by Sergio Amidei, for whom he worked as a stenographer. Through Amidei, Tozzi met Renato Castellani, with whom he collaborated as a screenwriter for Professor, My Son (1946) and Under the Sun of Rome (1948, based on a Tozzi's original story). In the early 1950s, he also started working as an assistant director and as an actor, sometimes being cast in main roles. His typical roles were of hardmen and villains. He was also active on stage, where he is best known for the role of Gnecco in Rugantino, and on television, in which he is well known for his performance as Menelaus in L'Odissea.

Tozzi died of respiratory failure, aged 57.

== Selected filmography ==
- Under the Sun of Rome (1948, screenwriter)
- Heaven over the Marshes (1949)
- Women Without Names (1950)
- Il caimano del Piave (1951)
- Four Ways Out (1951) - Luigi Girosi
- The Bandit of Tacca Del Lupo (1952) - Lt. Magistrelli
- Fratelli d'Italia (1952)
- Three Girls from Rome (1952 - screenwriter)
- Carmen proibita (1953) - José Salviatti
- Musoduro (1953) - Marco / Musoduro
- The Steel Rope (1953) - Filippo
- Casta Diva (1954) - Gaetano Donizetti
- Nel gorgo del peccato (1954) - Alberto Valli
- House of Ricordi (1954) - Arrigo Boito
- I cinque dell'Adamello (1954) - Leonida
- The Lost City (1955) - Rafael
- The Red Cloak (1955) - Luca de Bardi
- Folgore Division (1955) - Sergeant Turchi
- La ladra (1955) - Nino
- Un po' di cielo (1955)
- Songs of Italy (1955)
- Beatrice Cenci (1956) - Olimpio Calvetti
- East of Kilimanjaro (1957) - Dr. Enrico Trino
- The Sky Burns (1958) - Marchi
- Quando gli angeli piangono (1958)
- El Alamein (1958) - Capitano Valerio Bruschi
- The Defeated Victor (1958 - screenwriter)
- Quay of Illusions (1959) - Fausto
- Un uomo facile (1959)
- Dagli Appennini alle Ande (1959) - Marco's father
- Le secret du Chevalier d'Éon (1959)
- The Night of the Great Attack (1959) - Captain Zanco Di Monforte
- Questo amore ai confini del mondo (1960) - Don Claudio
- Constantine and the Cross (1961) - Hadrian
- Saint-Tropez Blues (1961) - Nino Trabucci, le peintre
- The Return of Doctor Mabuse (1961) - Warden Wolf
- El Cid (1961) - Dolfos
- The Wonders of Aladdin (1961) - Grand Vizier
- The Legion's Last Patrol (1962) - Brascia
- Swordsman of Siena (1962) - Hugo
- The Shortest Day (1963) - Uno dei soldati combattenti (uncredited)
- Shéhérazade (1963) - Barmak
- Gibraltar (1964) - Paoli
- The Visit (1964) - Darvis
- The Treasure of the Aztecs (1965) - Benito Juárez
- Pyramid of the Sun God (1965) - (uncredited)
- The Agony and the Ecstasy (1965) - Foreman
- I coltelli del vendicatore (1966) - Hagen
- I'll Kill Him and Return Alone (1967) - Pat Garrett
- The Sailor from Gibraltar (1967) - Captain
- The Appointment (1969) - Renzo
- La Faute de l'abbé Mouret (1970) - Jeanbernat
- A Man Called Sledge (1970) - Maximum security prisoner
- Mazzabubù... Quante corna stanno quaggiù? (1971) - Il marito eschimese
- Between Miracles (1971) - Primario
- The Deserter (1971) - Orozco
- Trastevere (1971) - Man near Joseph at St. Maria in Trastevere (uncredited)
- The Valachi Papers (1972) - Albert Anastasia
- The Sicilian Connection (1972)
- The Funny Face of the Godfather (1973) - Tony Malonzo
- Chino (1973) - Cruz
- The Bloody Hands of the Law (1973) - Nicolò Patrovita
- Mean Frank and Crazy Tony (1973) - Massara
- War Goddess (1973) - General
- Cry of a Prostitute (1974) - Don Ricuzzo Cantimo
- Crazy Joe (1974) - Frank
- The Left Hand of the Law (1975) - Giulio Costello
- L'altro Dio (1975) - Daniele Corsin
- Street People (1976) - Luigi Nicoletta
- Big Pot (1976)
- Oh, Serafina! (1976) - Carlo Vigeva
- Fear in the City (1976) - Esposito
- The Black Stallion (1979) - Rescue Captain
