= The Defeated Victor =

1958 film

- Film poster
- Directed by: Paolo Heusch
- Written by: Fausto Tozzi
- Starring: Maurizio Arena
- Cinematography: Roberto Gerardi
- Music by: Carlo Rustichelli
- Release date: 1958
- Running time: 102 minutes
- Country: Italy
- Language: Italian

The Defeated Victor (Italian: Un uomo facile) is a 1958 Italian drama film directed by Paolo Heusch. It was entered into the 9th Berlin International Film Festival.

== Cast ==
- Maurizio Arena as Romolo De Santis
- Giovanna Ralli as Lina
- Tiberio Mitri as Enrico Costantini
- Cathia Caro as Giuditta
- Fosco Giachetti as Doctor boxing
- Alberto Grassi as Menicucci
- Erminio Spalla as Coach
- Giulio Calì
- Lello Bersani as Speaker television
- Fausto Tozzi
