= Angelo, Tyrant of Padua =

Play by Victor Hugo

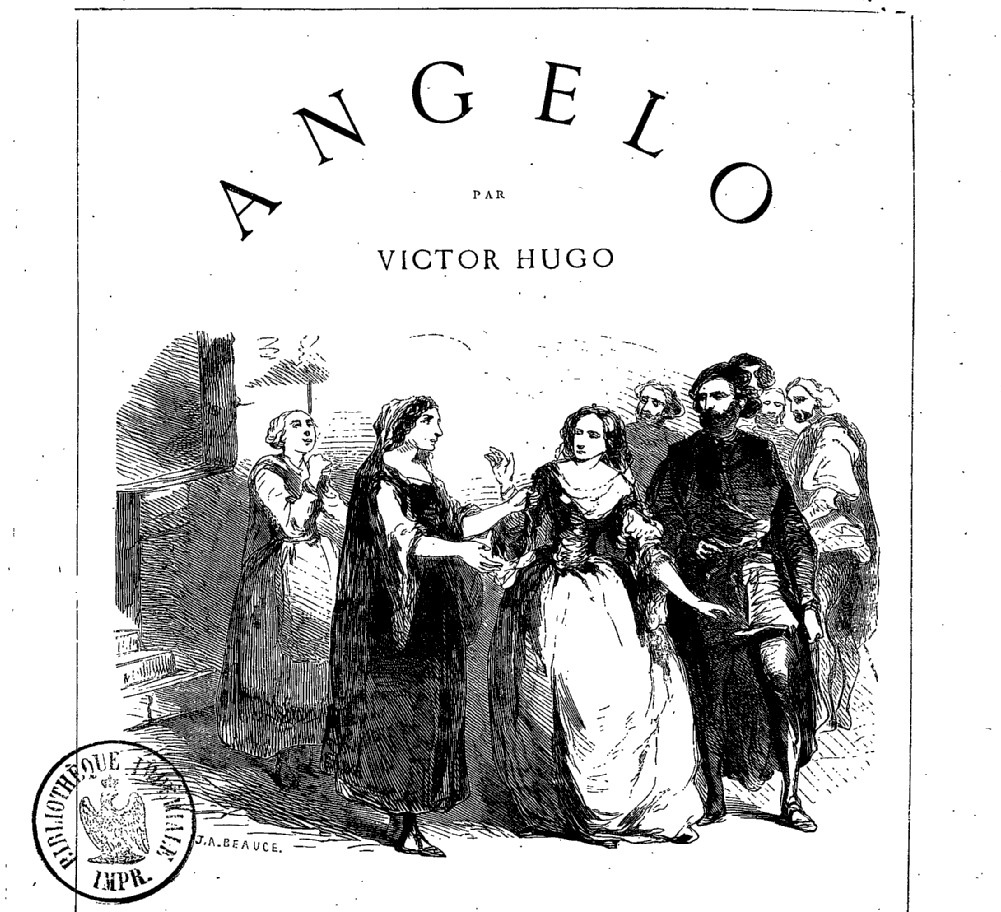
Theatrical poster

Angelo, Tyrant of Padua (French: Angelo, tyran de Padoue) is an 1835 play by the French writer Victor Hugo. It is a historical work on podestà Angelo, set in Padua in northern Italy. It was a return to the theatre for Hugo, whose previous work Marie Tudor had been a failure.

== Adaptations ==
The play has been adapted into a number of different works, including:

- Il giuramento, an 1837 opera composed by Saverio Mercadante
- Angelo, an 1876 opera composed by César Cui
- La Gioconda, an 1876 opera composed by Amilcare Ponchielli
- Angelo, Tyrant of Padua, a 1928 opera composed by Alfred Bruneau
- The Tyrant of Padua, a 1946 Italian film directed by Max Neufeld

== Bibliography ==
- Berlanstein, Lenard R. Daughters of Eve: A Cultural History of French Theater Women from the Old Regime to the Fin de Siècle. Harvard University Press, 2009.
- Stanton, Sarah & Barnham, Marting. The Cambridge Paperback Guide to Theatre. Cambridge University Press, 1996.
