= Cinevillaggio =

Italian film production facility

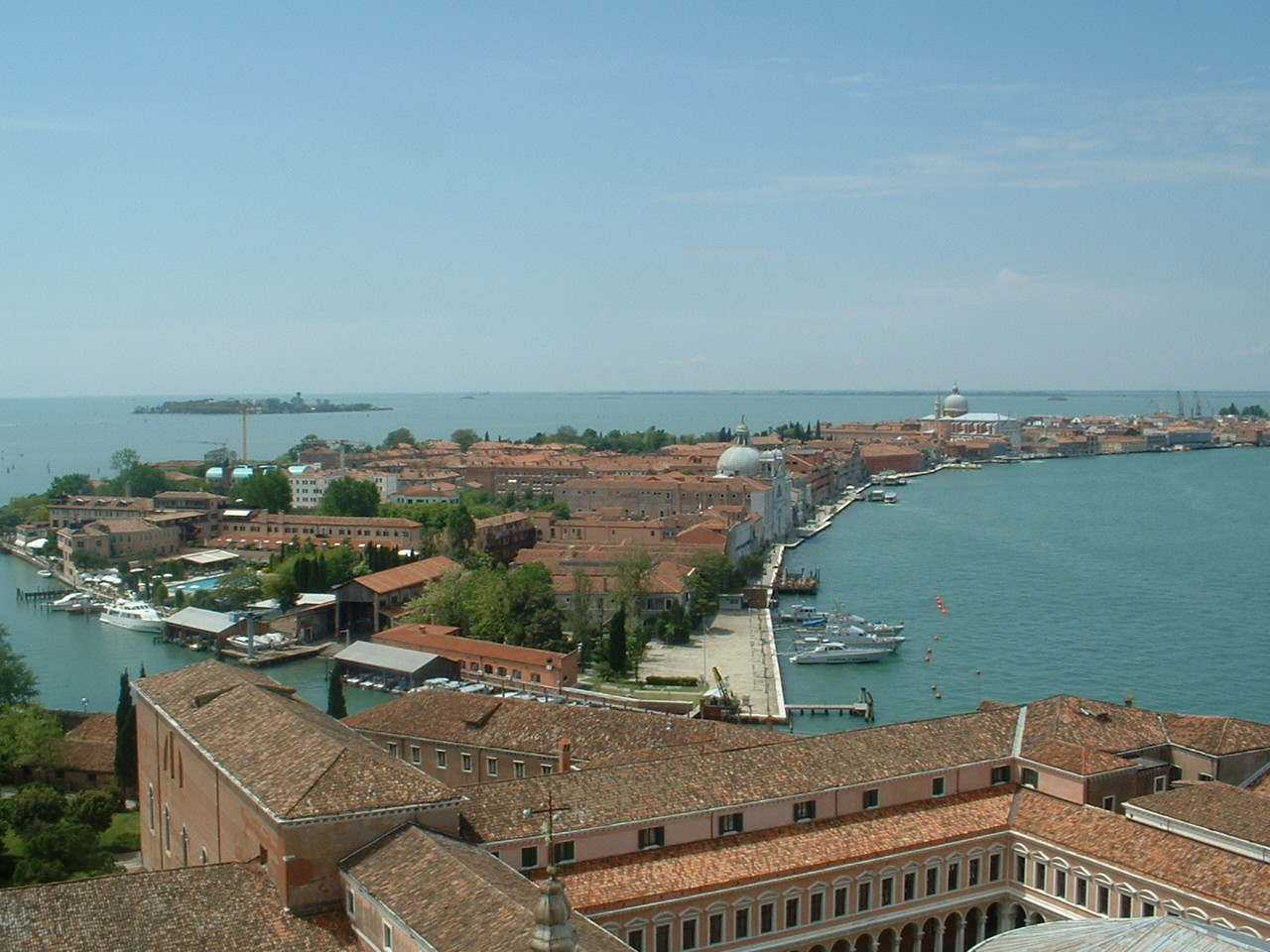
Giudecca, Venice, where Cinevillaggio was established in 1943

Cinevillaggio, also known as Cineisola, was a film production facility established in autumn 1943 by the Ministry of Popular Culture of the Italian Social Republic under the direction of the Minister of Popular Culture Fernando Mezzasoma. It was created as an alternative to the Cinecittà Studios in Rome.

== Background ==
Following the signing of the Armistice of Cassibile, the Italian film industry was thrown into disarray. Cinecittà was badly damaged in the Anglo-American air raids in the summer of 1943. Many of the most important Italian film companies, including Scalera, Titanus, Safa Palatino and Farnesina, were abandoned. Many of the leading actors had become untraceable. Guido Oliva, Cinecittà's director, had committed suicide and Luigi Freddi, head of the General Directorate of Cinematography, had disappeared temporarily.

== History ==
Cinevillaggio, was established in 1943 on the Giudecca in Venice. Its headquarters were based in improvised facilities, primarily utilizing buildings in the industrial area of Giudecca and spaces associated with the Venice Biennale, as well as the Scalera Film studios. The promoters intended the new facility to house the workers and equipment from the damaged Cinecittà studios in Rome, which had been damaged by Allied bombing and transformed into a displaced persons camp. Cinevillaggio would have enabled the continuation of film production for propaganda purposes. The facility aimed to produce around twenty films a year. However, this was impossible to achieve in practice due to the war, resulting in inadequate facilities, shortages of materials and energy, and transportation difficulties.

Many Italian directors and actors were reluctant to participate in Cinevillaggio, largely because it was directly affiliated with the Italian Social Republic, a puppet state under German occupation. Artists who moved to Venice risked being seen as supporters of the fascist regime. Those who participated in the films produced in Cinevillaggio included the actors Osvaldo Valenti, Luisa Ferida, Mino Doro, Salvo Randone, Emma Gramatica and Doris Duranti, and the directors Giorgio Ferroni, Francesco De Robertis, Piero Ballerini and Mario Baffico.

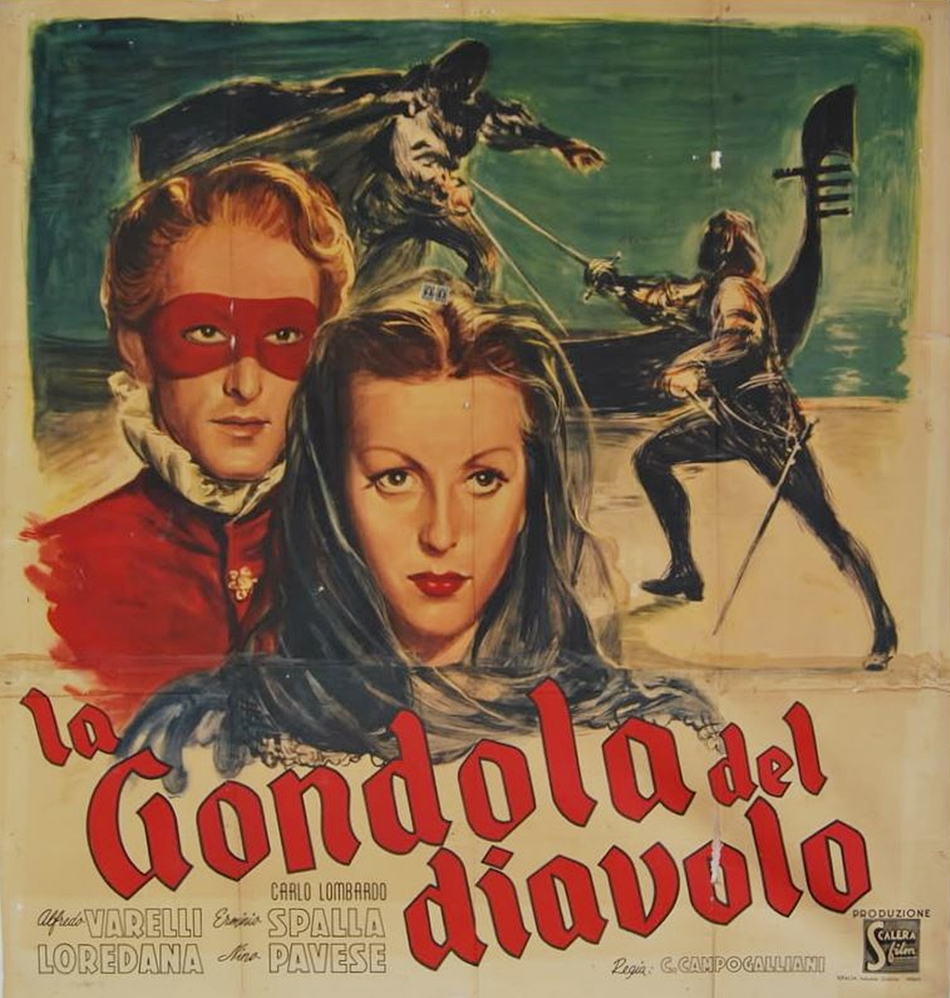
Advertising poster of Carlo Campogalliani's The Devil's Gondola filmed in Cinevillaggio in the last months of World War II

Cinevillaggio ceased operations in the spring of 1945 with the fall of the Republic of Salò. From autumn 1943 to the collapse of the Italian Social Republic, seventeen films were produced in Venice, while another seven were produced in Turin and four elsewhere. The Great Dawn, directed by Giuseppe Maria Scotese and produced by Scalera Film during the Italian Social Republic, was completed and released in 1947. Others movies were started but not completed by the end of the conflict and never resumed.

In light of the Axis' disastrous military situation in the final years of the war, the directors at Cinevillaggio carefully avoided propaganda. Instead, they opted for sentimental themes, comedy and melodrama in an attempt to boost morale among the population. Only one film with a purely propagandistic theme was made: Aeroporto (Airport), directed by Pietro Costa in 1944.

Following the war, all the structures of 'Cineisola' and 'Cinevillaggio' were dismantled. However, the Scalera warehouses continued to be used for several years. Many of the directors, screenwriters and actors who had worked for Cinevillaggio were marginalised after the war. Osvaldo Valenti and Luisa Ferida were executed, while screenwriters Marcello Marchesi and Vittorio Metz, as well as actors Nino Crisman and Valentina Cortese, were put on trial for collaborating with the Germans.

== Films produced in Cinevillaggio ==
- Resurrection, directed by Flavio Calzavara (1944);
- The Innkeeper, directed by Luigi Chiarini (1944);
- The Devil's Gondola, directed by Carlo Campogalliani (1945);
- The Tyrant of Padua, directed by Max Neufeld (1945).
- The Great Dawn, directed by Giuseppe Maria Scotese, completed and released in 1947.

== Bibliography ==
- Aristarco, Guido (1996). Il cinema fascista: il prima e il dopo. Bari: Dedalo. ISBN 978-8822050328.
- Brunetta, Gian Piero (2009). The History of Italian Cinema: A Guide to Italian Film from Its Origins to the Twenty-first Century. Princeton, NJ: Princeton University Press. ISBN 978-0691119885.
- Gundle, Stephen (2013). Mussolini's Dream Factory: Film Stardom in Fascist Italy. New York-Oxford: Berghahn Books. ISBN 978-1782382447.
- D'Ascenzo, Sara (10 January 2026). "Quando Venezia fabbricava il cinema: la storia della «Cinecittà» in laguna alla Giudecca". Corriere del Veneto.
