= Angelo, tyran de Padoue (opera) =

Angelo, tyran de Padoue is a 1928 opera by Alfred Bruneau, with a libretto by Charles Méré, based on the 1835 play Angelo, Tyrant of Padua by Victor Hugo.
