= Nino Pavese =

Italian actor

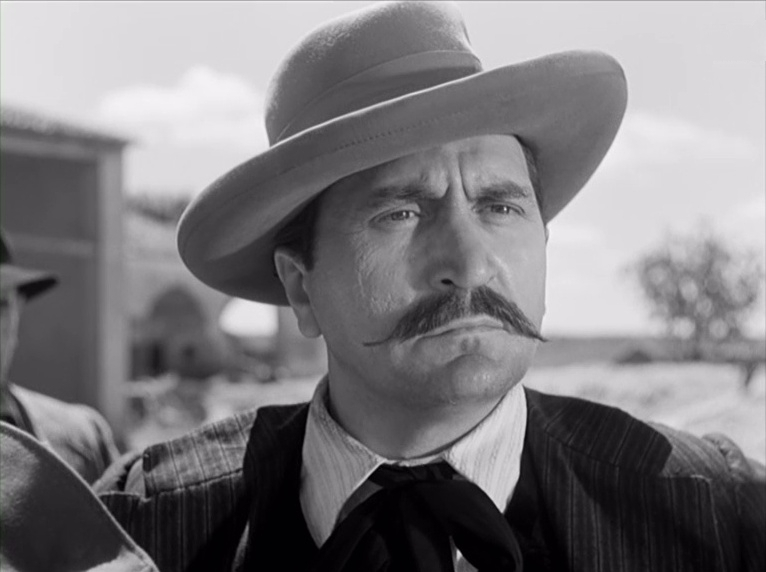
- Pavese in The Mill on the Po (1949)
- Born: 10 April 1904; Asti, Italy
- Died: 21 December 1979 (aged 75); Rome, Italy
- Occupations: Actor; voice actor
- Years active: 1936–1979
- Spouse: Jolanda Peghin (m. 1930)
- Children: Paila Pavese
- Relatives: Luigi Pavese (brother)

Nino Pavese (10 April 1904 – 21 December 1979) was an Italian actor and voice actor.

== Biography ==
Born in Asti and the younger brother of actor and voice actor Luigi Pavese, he began his career on stage with a theatrical troupe in the early 1930s before moving on to cinema. Pavese appeared in over 49 films between 1936 and 1973. He made his debut film appearance in the 1936 film The Two Sergeants directed by Enrico Guazzoni. Pavese was often typically cast as villains in dramatic or adventure films.

In addition to working as a screen actor, Pavese was also a popular dubbing artist. He usually dubbed the voices of James Cagney, Steve Cochran, Albert Dekker, Bruce Cabot, Anthony Caruso, Conrad Veidt, and many more in most of their films. He also dubbed his brother's voice in the 1954 film Farewell, My Beautiful Lady. In his animated roles, Pavese voiced George Darling in the Italian dub of Peter Pan.

Pavese married Jolanda Peghin in 1930. Their daughter Paila was also a voice actress.

== Selected filmography ==
- I due sergenti (1936)
- The Forsaken (1937)
- Antonio Meucci (1940)
- La fanciulla di Portici (1940)
- The Pirate's Dream (1940)
- Non me lo dire! (1940)
- Abandonment (1940)
- Antonio Meucci (1940)
- Pirates of Malaya (1941)
- The King of England Will Not Pay (1941)
- Blood Wedding (1941)
- Il fanciullo del West (1942)
- Black Gold (1942)
- Sealed Lips (1942)
- Tempesta sul golfo (1943)
- Il nostro prossimo (1943)
- A Little Wife (1943)
- Non mi muovo! (1943)
- Dagli Appennini alle Ande (1943)
- The Valley of the Devil (1943)
- Fear no Evil (1945)
- Circo equestre Za-bum (1945)
- The Ten Commandments (1945)
- I Met You in Naples (1946)
- The Ways of Sin (1946)
- The Devil's Gondola (1946)
- The Tyrant of Padua (1946)
- Pian delle stelle (1946)
- The White Primrose (1947)
- The Mill on the Po (1948)
- How I Discovered America (1949)
- Anthony of Padua (1949)
- Una voce nel tuo cuore (1949)
- Il Brigante Musolino (1950)
- L'edera (1950)
- The Ungrateful Heart (1951)
- The Last Sentence (1951)
- See Naples and Die (1951)
- The Black Mask (1952 film) (1951)
- Arrivano i nostri (1951)
- Papà ti ricordo! (1952)
- Lieutenant Giorgio (1952)
- The Passaguai Family Gets Rich (1952)
- Il tallone d'Achille (1952)
- The Black Mask (1952)
- Serenata amara (1952)
- Siamo tutti inquilini (1953)
- La pattuglia dell'Amba Alagi (1953)
- 100 Years of Love (1953)
- La grande avventura (1954)
- Piccola santa (1954)
- Non perdiamo la testa (1959)
- I piaceri del sabato notte (1960)
- Ten Italians for One German (1962)
- Sono stato io (1973)

== Voice work ==
=== Dubbing ===
==== Films (Animation, Italian dub) ====
Year	Title	Role(s)	Ref
1953	Peter Pan	George Darling	
