= Giuseppe Maria Scotese =

Italian film director and screenwriter

- Born: 26 January 1916; Monteprandone, Italy
- Died: 19 May 2002 (aged 86); Rome, Italy
- Occupations: Writer, Director
- Years active: 1945-1983 (film)

Giuseppe Maria Scotese (26 January 1916 – 19 May 2002) was an Italian screenwriter and film director.

== Selected filmography ==
- Fear No Evil (1945)
- The Models of Margutta (1946)
- The Great Dawn (1947)
- Carmen (1953)
- The Red Cloak (1955)
- Pirate of the Half Moon (1957)
- Questo amore ai confini del mondo (1960)
- Miracles Still Happen (1974)

== Bibliography ==
- Goble, Alan. The Complete Index to Literary Sources in Film. Walter de Gruyter, 1999.
