= Al Jaghbub Oasis =

Protected area in northeastern Libya

The Al Jaghbub Oasis is a protected area in northeastern Libya lying close to the border with Egypt. It adjoins the desert village of Jaghbub which is inhabited by Berbers with a population of about 400.

== Geography ==
The Al Jaghbub Oasis is located on the northern edge of the Libyan Desert in a deep depression that is sunk about 10 m (33 ft) below sea level. To the north of the oasis are escarpments where the Al Jaghbub Formation dating to the Middle Miocene is exposed. This forms a layer largely composed of dolomite, running to the west where it is equivalent to the Marmarica Foundation and about 180 m (600 ft) thick, and to the east as far as the Moghra Oasis where it is only 5 m (16 ft) thick and has a high sand content. At Al Jaghbub it is about 120 m (400 ft) thick and consists of white to yellow limestone, clay, marl and sandstone. Fossils of echinoderms, bivalve molluscs, gastropods and bryozoans are found in this formation. The Siwa Oasis in western Egypt lies about 100 km (62 mi) to the southeast in a similar depression.

== History ==
The Al Jaghbub Oasis was an important staging post for trans-Saharan traders and for pilgrims going to Siwa, Cairo and on to Mecca. In 1856, Muhammad ibn Ali as-Senussi moved the headquarters of the Senussi movement from Bayda to here. Al Jaghbub became a fortress town with an important Islamic university, second only in prestige to the Al-Azhar University in Cairo.

== The oasis ==
The protected area was set up to provide a habitat in which the native wild animals and plants of the area could flourish. The governmental body overseeing the protected area is the Technical Committee of Wildlife and National Parks which was created in 1990.

The oasis is visited by birds, especially waterfowl, during their annual migrations. It is of particular interest because of the presence here of a subspecies of cockle Cardium edule rectidens, a marine bivalve mollusc.
