= Siege of Syracuse (film) =

- Directed by: Pietro Francisci
- Written by: Ennio De Concini; Giorgio Graziosi; Pietro Francisci
- Cinematography: Carlo Carlini
- Edited by: Nino Baragli
- Music by: Angelo Francesco Lavagnino
- Release date: 1960
- Language: Italian

Siege of Syracuse (Italian: L'assedio di Siracusa) is a 1960 historical drama film about the Roman Siege of Syracuse, which took place between 213 and 212 B.C., during the Second Punic War with Carthage.

The film was directed by Pietro Francisci.

== Cast ==
- Rossano Brazzi as Archimedes
- Tina Louise as Diana / Artemide / Lucrezia
- Sylva Koscina as Clio
- Enrico Maria Salerno as Gorgia
- Gino Cervi as Gerone
- Alberto Farnese as Marcus Claudius Marcellus
- Luciano Marin as Marco
- Alfredo Varelli as Kriton
- Walter Grant as Tiresias
- Mara Lombardo as Selinonte Dancer

== Reception ==
Dave Sindelar called the film "un-even". The film was criticized for a lack of historical accuracy.

== See also ==
- List of historical drama films
- List of films set in ancient Rome
