= Scalera Film =

Italian film company

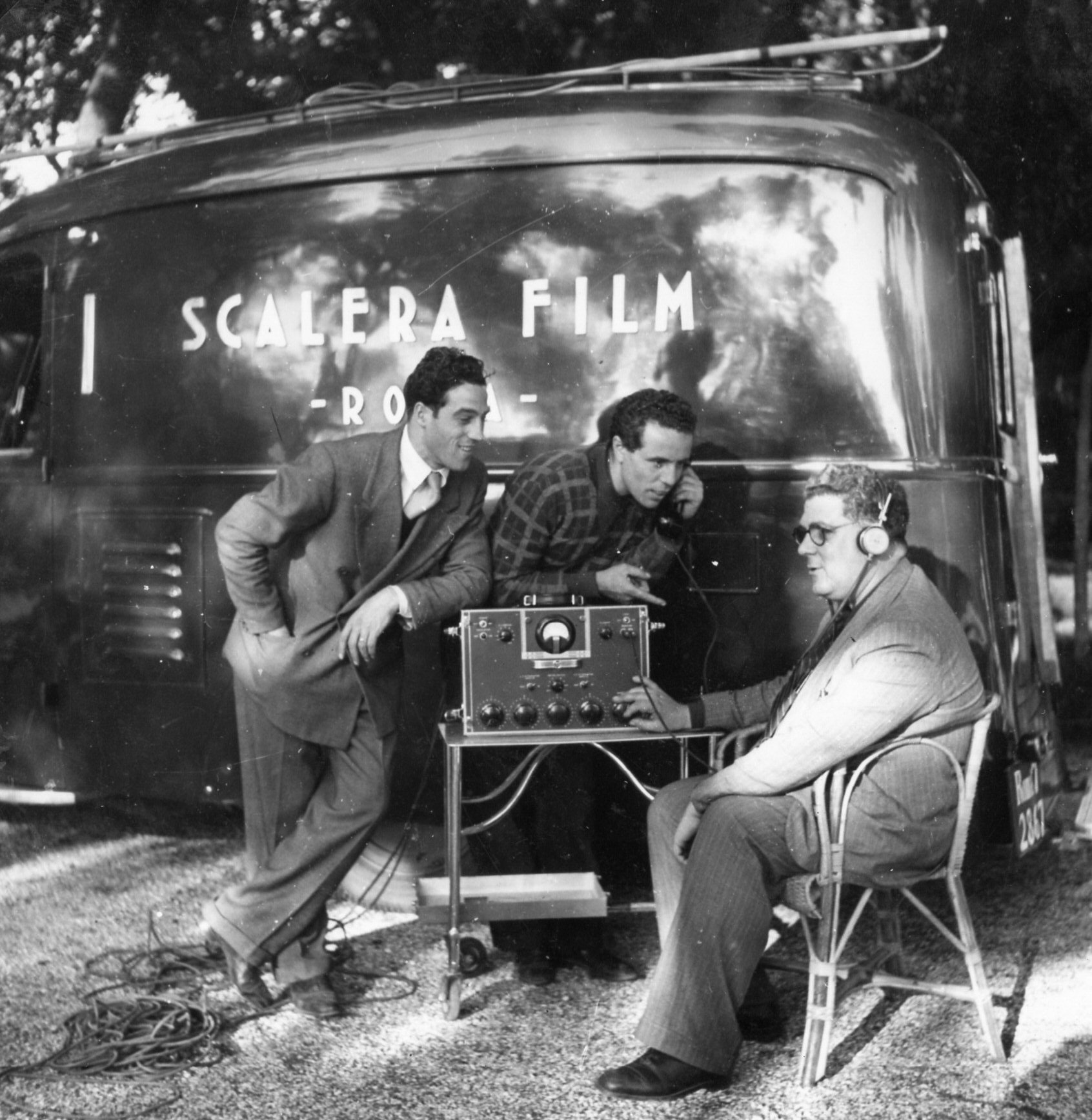
Scalera equipment van in the 1940s

Scalera Film was an Italian film production and distribution company which operated between 1938 and 1950. It had strong backing from the Italian state, as the Fascist government of Benito Mussolini was keen to build up and centralise the Italian film industry. It was founded by the brothers Michele and Salvatore Scalera, and primarily based at the Scalera Studios in Rome. In 1943 during the German occupation of Rome, the studio was relocated to Venice in the Italian Social Republic as part of a planned Cinevillaggio film complex developed by Mussolini loyalists.

Following the end of the World War II, the studio had some difficulties repossessing its Rome Studios as it was considered politically suspect due to its close links with the old regime. Eventually production was restarted with attempts to build co-production arrangements with film-makers in other countries. In late 1950 Scalera opened a distribution subsidiary in the United States, but then suddenly collapsed financially during the shooting of Othello, and the company was formally liquidated two years later; the American office, which had acquired reissue rights for 70 films formerly handled by Superfilm Distributing Corp., was closed before the end of 1951.

== Bibliography ==
- Brunetta, Gian Piero. The History of Italian Cinema: A Guide to Italian Film from Its Origins to the Twenty-first Century. Princeton University Press, 2009.
- Ricci, Steven. Cinema and Fascism: Italian Film and Society, 1922–1943. University of California Press, 2008.
