= Sibella =

Sibella is a female given name. Notable persons with that name include:

- Sibella Annie Barrington (1867–1929), Canadian nurse
- Sibella Cottle, mistress to Irishman Sir Henry Lynch-Blosse, 7th Baronet (1749–1788)
- Sibella Macarthur-Onslow (1871–1943), Australian charity worker
- Sibella Elizabeth Miles (1800–1882), English poet
- Sibella Ross (1840–1929), New Zealand schoolteacher and businesswoman

== Fictional characters ==
- Sibella Dracula, the daughter of Dracula in the 1988 animated film Scooby-Doo and the Ghoul School
- Sibella Hallward, a character in the 1949 film Kind Hearts and Coronets

== See also ==
- Iolaus sibella, a butterfly
- Sibilla (disambiguation)
- Sibylla (disambiguation)
- Sibyl
- Sibyl (disambiguation)
- Sibylle (disambiguation)
- Queen Sybilla (disambiguation)
