= List of compositions by Nino Rota =

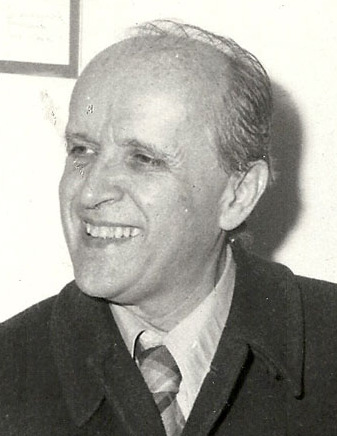
Rota in 1976

This is a list of compositions by Nino Rota (1911–1979).

== Opera ==
- Il principe porcaro (1925-26)
- Ariodante (1938–1941)
- Torquemada (1943)
- I due timidi (1950)
- Il cappello di paglia di Firenze (premiere 1955)
- Scuola di guida (1959)
- La notte di un nevrastenico (1959)
- Lo scoiattolo in gamba (1959)
- Aladino e la lampada magica (1963–1965)
- La visita meravigliosa (1965–1969)
- Napoli milionaria (1973–1977)

== Choral ==
- Allegro concertante per Coro e Orchestra (1953)
- Audi Judex per coro misto a 4 voci a cappella (1964)
- Canto di Gloria (1968)
- Custodi nos Domine per Coro
- Due Mottetti Vigilate et orate
- Il martirio di San Giovanni Battista/The Martyrdom of St. John the Baptist (1924)
- Il natale degli innocenti (1968–70)
- Il pane del cielo (1967)
- Il pastorello e altre due liriche infantile (canto e pianoforte) (1935)
- Il presagio (1925)
- Inno del seminario la quercia per coro, una voce e pianoforte
- L'infanzia di San Giovanni Battista/The childhood of St. John the Baptist (1922–23)
- L'isola disabitata (1931)
- La figliola del re (ex Un augello gorgheggiava) (1925)
- La vita di Maria (1969–1970)
- Messa a 4 voci (senza Gloria) (1962)
- Messa di Requiem (1923–1924)
- Messa per coro e organo (Orchestra) (1960)
- Messa, Mariae dicata per coro e organo (1961)
- Mysterium Catholicum (1962)
- Ninna Nanna (1922, 1923)
- Psallite nato de Maria Virgine (1958)
- Quando tu sollevi la lampada al cielo (1922)
- Roma Capomunni (1970–1971)
- Salmo IC (1943)
- Salmo VI Domine (1943)
- Salve Regina per voce e pianoforte (1958)
- Sonetto di Petrarca (1933)
- Three Canons For Women's Voices (1932)
- Tota Pulchrases (1961)
- Tu es Petrus in sol maggiore (1967)
- Unum panem (1962)

== Vocal ==
- Perché si spense la lampada (Quando tu sollevi la lampada al cielo) (agosto 1923)
- Vocalizzi per Soprano leggero e Pianoforte (1957)
- Tre liriche infantili per canto (soprano, tenor) e pianoforte/Three children's lyrical poems for voice and piano (1935)
- Le Prime Battute di 6 Canzoni e un Coro per "L'Isola Disabitata" (aprile 1932)
- Mater fons amoris per Soprano (o tenore) solo, coro di donne e organo (1961)
- Canto e Pianoforte (1972)
- Ballata e Sonetto di Petrarca (1933)

== Orchestral ==
- Infanzia di S. Giovanni Battista oratorio per soli, coro e orchestra (1922)
- Balli per piccola orchestra (1932–1934)
- Sonata (Canzona) per orchestra da camera (1935)
- Variazioni e fuga nei 12 toni sul nome di Bach per orchestra (1950)
- Concerto festivo in Fa per orchestra (1958–61)
- Concerto per archi (1964–65, nuova revisione 1977)
- Due Momenti (Divertimenti) (1970)
- Fantasia sopra dodici note del Don Giovanni (1960)
- Fuga per Quartetto d'Archi, Organo e Orchestra d'Archi (1923)
- Guardando il Fujiyama (Pensiero per Hiroshima) (1976)
- La Fiera di Bari (1963, 28-4)
- La Strada (1966)
- Le Molière imaginaire – Ballet Suite (1976–78)
- Meditazione per coro e orchestra (1954)
- Rabelaisiana (1977)
- Serenata per Orchestra in quattro tempi (1931–1932)
- Sinfonia n.1 per orchestra (1935–1939)
- Sinfonia n.2 in Fa per orchestra (1937–39)
- Sinfonia n.3 in Do (1956–1957)
- Sinfonia Sopra una Canzone d'Amore (1947) (first performance 1972)
- Sonata per orchestra da camera (1937–1938)
- Variazioni sopra un tema gioviale per orchestra (1953)
- Waltzes

=== Concertos for solo instrument and orchestra ===
==== Piano and orchestra ====
- Cadenze per il Concerto n.4 in sol Hob.XVIII:4 di Joseph Haydn
- Concerto in C major (1960)
- Concerto soirée (1962) (a suite of six movements for piano and orchestra)
- Concerto in E minor (subtitled Piccolo mondo antico after Antonio Fogazzaro's novel) (1973, 1978)

==== String instrument and orchestra ====
- Concerto per Violoncello n.0 (1925)
- Concerto per Arpa (1947)
- Divertimento Concertante per Contrabasso e Orchestra (1968–73)
- Concerto per Violoncello n.1 (1972)
- Concerto per Violoncello n.2 (1973)

==== Wind instrument and orchestra ====
- Harp Concerto (1947)
- Andante sostenuto per il Concerto per Corno K412 di Mozart (1959)
- Concerto per Trombone e orchestra (1966)
- Ballata per Corno e orchestra "Castel del Monte" (1974)
- Concerto per Fagotto (1974–77)
- Bassoon Concerto (1977)

== Chamber ==
=== Duets ===
- Pezzo per Corno in Fa e Contrabasso (1931)
- Sonata per ottoni e organo (1972)
- Tre Pezzi per 2 flauti (1972–73)

==== For string instrument and piano ====
- Improvviso in re minore per violino e pianoforte (1947)
- Improvviso per Violino e Pianoforte (Un diavolo sentimentale) (1969)
- Intermezzo per viola e pianoforte (1945)
- Sonata in sol per Viola e Pianoforte (1934–35, revised 1970)
- Sonata per Viola e Pianoforte della Sonata in Re per Clarinetto e pianoforte (1945)
- Sonata per violino e pianoforte (1936–37)

==== For wind instrument and piano ====
- Castel del Monte – Ballata per Corno e Pianoforte (1974)
- Cinque Pezzi facili per flauto e pianoforte (1972)
- Elegia Per Oboe E Pianoforte (1955)
- Pezzo in re per clarinetto e pianoforte (Agosto) (1977)
- Sonata in Re per Clarinetto e Pianoforte (1945)
- Toccata per Fagotto e Pianoforte (1974)

==== For flute and harp ====
- Cadenze per il Concerto K299 di Mozart per flauto e arpa (1962)
- Sonata per flauto e arpa (1937)

=== Trios ===
- Trio per clarinetto, violoncello e pianoforte (1973)
- Trio per Flauto, Violino e Pianoforte (1958 settembre)

=== Quartets ===
- Invenzioni per quartetto d'archi (1932)
- Quartetto per archi (1948–54)

=== Miscellaneous ===
- Il Presepio: Quartetto d'archi con voce (1929)
- Il Richiamo: Quintetto d'archi con voce (1923)
- Minuetto (1931)
- Nonetto, per flauto, oboe, clarinetto, fagotto, corno, violino, viola, cello e contrabasso (1959, 1974, 1977)
- Piccola Offerta Musicale per flauto, oboe, clarinetto, corno e fagotto (1943)
- Quintetto per flauto, oboe, viola, violoncello e arpa (1935)
- Romanza (Aria) e Marcia (1968)
- Sarabanda e Toccata per Arpa (1945)
- Sonata per Organo (1965)

== Piano ==
- Il Mago doppio-Suite per quattro mani (1919)
- Tre pezzi (1920)
- Preludio e Fuga per Pianoforte a 4 Mani (Storia del Mago Doppio) (1922)
- Illumina Tu, O Fuoco (1924)
- Io Cesserò il Mio Canto (1924)
- Ascolta o Cuore June (1924)
- Il Presàgio (1925)
- La Figliola Del Re (Un Augello Gorgheggiava) (1925)
- Ippolito gioca (1930)
- Ballo della villanotta in erba (1931)
- Campane a Festa (1931)
- Campane a Sera (1933)
- Il Pastorello e altre Due Liriche Infantili (1935)
- La Passione (poesia popolare) (1938)
- Bagatella (1941)
- Fantasia in sol (1945)
- Fantasia in do (1946)
- Azione teatrale scritta nel 1752 da Pietro Metastasio (1954)
- Variazioni e Fuga in dodici toni sul nome de Bach (1950)
- 15 Preludi (1964)
- Sette Pezzi Difficili per Bambini (1971)
- Cantico in Memoria di Alfredo Casella (1972)
- Due Valzer sul nome di Bach (1975)

== Film scores ==
Rota composed music for more than 170 films, including The Godfather Parts I and II and Franco Zeffirelli's Romeo and Juliet.

== See also ==
- Nino Rota discography
