= Sibylle =

Sibylle is a given name. It may refer to:

- Anna Sibylle of Hanau-Lichtenberg (1542–1580), eldest surviving daughter of Count Philipp IV and Countess Eleonore of Fürstenberg
- Duchess Magdalene Sibylle of Prussia (1586–1659), Electress of Saxony as the spouse of John George I, Elector of Saxony
- Duchess Sibylle of Saxe-Lauenburg (1675–1733), Margravine of Baden-Baden
- Magdalene Sibylle of Holstein-Gottorp (1631–1719), Duchess of Hostein-Gottorp by birth and by marriage Duchess of Mecklenburg-Güstrow
- Magdalena Sibylle of Saxe-Weissenfels (1648–1681), German noblewoman
- Magdalene Sibylle of Saxe-Weissenfels (1673–1726), German noblewoman
- Magdalene Sibylle of Saxony (1617–1668), Princess of Denmark from 1634 to 1647 as the wife of Prince-Elect Christian of Denmark, and the Duchess consort of Saxe-Altenburg as the wife of Frederick Wilhelm II, Duke of Saxe-Altenburg
- Margravine Magdalene Sibylle of Brandenburg-Bayreuth (1612–1687), Electress of Saxony from 1656 to 1680 as the wife of John George II
- Sibylle Christine of Anhalt-Dessau (1603–1686), by birth a member of the House of Ascania and princess of Anhalt-Dessau. Through her two marriages, Countess of Hanau-Münzenberg and Hanau-Lichtenberg
- Sibylle Elisabeth of Württemberg (1584-1606), German Princess member of the House of Württemberg and by marriage Duchess of Saxony
- Sibylle of Baden (1485–1518), Margravine of Baden by birth and by marriage, Countess of Hanau-Lichtenberg
- Sibylle of Bavaria (1489–1519), member of the House of Wittelsbach, princess of Bavaria-Munich and by marriage Electress Palatine
- Sibylle of Brandenburg (1467–1524), Princess of Brandenburg by birth and by marriage Duchess of Jülich and Duchess of Berg
- Sibylle of Cleves (1512–1554), Electress consort of Saxony
- Sibylle of Jülich-Cleves-Berg (1557–1628), Margravine of Burgau, daughter of Duke William the Rich and Archduchess Maria of Austria
- Sibylle of Saxony (1515–1592), Saxon princess of the Albertine line of House of Wettin and by marriage Duchess of Saxe-Lauenburg
- Sibylle Riqueti de Mirabeau (1849–1932), Comtesse de Martel de Janville, French writer who wrote under the pseudonym Gyp
- Sibylle Schwarz or Sibylla Schwarz, (1621–1638), German poet of the Baroque era
- Sibylle Ursula von Braunschweig-Lüneburg (1629–1671), German translator and writer
- Sibylle von Olfers (1881–1916), German art teacher and a nun

Contemporary

- Sibylle Berg (born 1962), German writer of novels, essays, short stories, and plays
- Sibylle Bergemann (1941–2010), German photographer
- Sibylle Blanc (born 1974), French-speaking Swiss actress and director in theatrical, film, television
- Sibylle Boden-Gerstner (1920–2016), German costume designer, artist and fashion writer
- Sibylle Brauner (born 1975), German alpine skier
- Sibylle Canonica (born 1957), Swiss actress
- Sibylle Günter (born 1964), German theoretical physicist researching tokamak plasmas
- Sibylle Lewitscharoff (1954–2023), German author
- Sibylle Kemmler-Sack (1934-1999), German chemist
- Sibylle Laurischk (1954–2020), German politician
- Sibylle Matter (born 1973), Swiss athlete of the triathlon and physician
- Sibylle Merk (born 1968), German yacht racer
- Sibylle Pasche (born 1976), Swiss artist and sculptor
- Sibylle Pfeiffer (born 1951), German politician
- Sibylle Rauch (born 1960), German former film actress, nude model and pornographic actress

== See also ==
- Cybil (disambiguation)
- Sibyl (disambiguation)
- Sibylla (disambiguation)
- Sibille (disambiguation)
