= Sibylla =

Sibylla or Sybilla may refer to:

== People with the name ==
=== Pre-modern era ===
- Sibylla of Acerra (1153–1205), queen consort of Sicily
- Sibylla of Anhalt (1514–1614), Duchess of Württemberg
- Sibylla of Anjou (died 1165), Countess of Flanders
- Sibylla of Armenia (c. 1240–1290), Princess of Antioch
- Sybilla of Burgundy (1060–1103), Duchess of Burgundy
- Sibylla of Cyprus (1198–c. 1230 or 1252), queen consort of Armenia
- Sibylla, Queen of Jerusalem (c. 1160–1190), queen regnant of Jerusalem
- Sybilla of Normandy (c. 1092–1122), queen consort of Scotland
- Sybilla Corbet of Alcester (c. 1077–1157), English noblewoman and mistress of King Henry I of England

=== Modern era ===
- Princess Sibylla of Saxe-Coburg and Gotha (1908–1972), a member of the Swedish royal family
- Sibilla Aleramo (1876–1960), Italian poet
- Sibylla Budd (born c. 1977), Australian actress
- Sibylla Bailey Crane (1851–1902), American educator, composer, author
- Sibylla Flügge (born 1950), German lawyer and professor
- Sybilla Nitsch (born 1980), German politician
- Sybla Ramus (1874–1963), American violinist, pianist, and writer
- Sibylla Schwarz (1621–1638), German poet
- Sybilla Mittell Weber (1892–1957), American artist

== Other uses ==
- Sibylla (mantis), a genus of insect
  - Sibylla pretiosa, one such species
- 168 Sibylla, an asteroid
- Sibylla (fast food), a classic fast food concept marketed in Sweden

== See also ==
- Sibilla (disambiguation)
- Sibella (disambiguation)
- Sibyl
- Sibyl (disambiguation)
- Sibylle (disambiguation)
- Queen Sybilla (disambiguation)
