= Nino Rota discography =

- Film poster from Romeo and Juliet, which Rota scored
- Soundtrack albums: 22
- Film score compilations: 20
- Chamber music: 13
- Orchestral music: 20
- Opera: 2

Below is a selected discography for Nino Rota (1911–1979). He was a prolific composer, and there are numerous recordings of his music—both popular and classical. There are new performances and recordings of Rota's music being made to this day.

Nino Rota is best known for his many film scores—in particular for the seminal Fellini films La Strada (1954), La Dolce Vita (1960), 8 1/2 (1963), Juliet of the Spirits (1965), and Amarcord (1974). He also wrote the scores for Franco Zeffirelli's Romeo and Juliet (1968), Luchino Visconti's The Leopard, and Francis Ford Coppola's The Godfather (1972) and The Godfather Part II. For Fellini alone, Rota produced almost 80 film scores starting with The White Sheik in 1952 and ending with the unfairly forgotten Orchestra Rehearsal in 1979, the year of the composer's death.

Rota's film scores were a great commercial success. The soundtrack album of Romeo and Juliet, with combined dialogue and music, reached number two and spent 74 weeks on the Billboard charts. The theme song for La Strada sold more than two million copies in Italy alone.

The film scores won many awards. For example, the score for The Godfather was nominated for an Oscar, won a British Academy Film Award, a Golden Globe Award, and a Grammy.

Less well known is the fact that Rota was a prolific composer of chamber music, operas, and orchestral pieces. In all he produced four symphonies, twelve operas, five ballets, three piano concertos, three cello concertos, various choral works, and dozens of chamber works—the best known being his Concerto for Strings.

== Soundtracks ==
Album title and selections	Conductor/Artist(s)	Label	Year
La Dolce Vita (The Sweet Life)	This is the original motion-picture soundtrack	CAM; Cat No: CAM 493095; 10 January 2003	2003
Romeo and Juliet	This is the original motion-picture soundtrack	Silva; Cat No: 1140; 25 June 2002	2002
Otto e Mezzo (8 1/2)	This is the original motion-picture soundtrack	CAM; Cat No: CAM 511316; 1 March 2009	2009
Amarcord (I Remember)	This is the original motion-picture soundtrack; Carlo Savina (conductor)	CAM; Cat No: CAM 511317; 28 March 2003	2003
Giulietta degli Spiriti (Juliet of the Spirits)	This is the original motion-picture soundtrack; Carlo Savina (conductor)	CAM; Cat No: CAM 511318; 5 May 2003	2003
Il Bidone (The Swindle)	This is the original motion-picture soundtrack	CAM; Cat No: CAM 512127; 21 May 2003	2003
I Clowns (The Clowns)	This is the original motion-picture soundtrack	CAM; Cat No: CAM 515394; 12 December 2006	2006
Rocco e i suoi fratelli (Rocco and his Brothers)	This is the original motion-picture soundtrack	CAM; Cat No: CAM 515510; 17 June 2009	2009
Prova d'orchestra (Orchestra Rehearsal)	This is the original motion-picture soundtrack; Carlo Savina (conductor); Armando Trovaioli (conductor)	CAM; Cat No: CAM 515465; 23 September 2008	2008
Il Gattopardo (The Leopard)	This is the original motion-picture soundtrack	CAM; Cat No: CAM 493267; 28 January 2005	2005
Il Casanova di Federico Fellini (Fellini's Casanova)	This is the original motion-picture soundtrack	CAM; Cat No: CAM 493094; 30 April 2004	2004
War and Peace	This is the original motion-picture soundtrack; Franco Ferrara (conductor)	El Records; Cat No: EM 147C; 10 June 2008	2008
Taming of the Shrew Soundtrack	This is the original motion-picture soundtrack; Carlo Savina (conductor)	DRG; Catalog No: 335	1967
The Godfather Part 3 - Original Soundtrack	This is the original motion-picture soundtrack	Sony; Cat No: 7243795; 1 March 2008	2008
Waterloo	This is the original motion-picture soundtrack; Bruno Nicolai (conductor)	Legend; Catalog No: CD20	1995
Shoot Loud, Louder... I Don't Understand	This is the original motion-picture soundtrack; Nino Rota (conductor)	Intermezzo Media; Catalog No: 104	1995
Death on the Nile Soundtrack	This is the original motion-picture soundtrack; Nino Rota (conductor)	DRG; Catalog No: 19091; 11 July 2006	2006
Boccaccio 70 Soundtrack: music by Nino Rota, Armando Trovajoli, and Piero Umiliani	This is the original motion-picture soundtrack	Phantom; Cat No: 930204; 1 March 2011	2011
Nino Rota LSD Roma: Tracks 1–10 from Toby Dammit (1968); Tracks 11–17 from Roma) (1972); Tracks 18–19 from Shoot Loud, Louder... I Don't Understand (1966); Tracks 20–21 from Love and Anarchy (1973)	These are the original motion-picture soundtracks	El Records; Catalog No: El 61; 27 December 2005	2005
Fellini-Rota: Three Original Motion Picture Soundtracks: Music from Toby Dammit (1968), Satyricon (1969), and Roma (1972)	These are the original motion-picture soundtracks	CAM; Catalog No: 7018	2003
Accadde Al Penitenziario (It Happened to the Prison) Un Eroe Dei Nostri Tempi (Hero of our Times)	These are the original motion-picture soundtracks	CAM; Cat No: CAM 493295; 1 January 1992	1992
Origins of the Mafia	The original soundtrack from the 1976 TV mini-series 'The Legend of the Black Hand'; orchestrated and conducted by Ennio Morricone and Gino Marinuzzi Jr	RCA; Catalog No: OST 137	1976

== Film score compilations ==
Album title & selections	Conductor/Artist(s)	Label	Year
The Ultimate Best of Fellini & Rota: 1. Lo Sceicco Bianco 2:33; 2. I Vitelloni 2:10; 3. La Strada 3:28; 4. Il Bidone (suite) 2:56; 5. Le Notti Di Cabiria 4:38; 6. La Dolce Vita (suite) 6:25; 7. Boccaccio '70 – Le Tentazioni Del Dottor Antonio 2:03; 8. Otto E Mezzo 4:27; 9. Giulietta Degli Spiriti (suite) 4:06; 10. Tre Passi Nel Delirio (ep. Toby Dammit) 4:35; 11. Fellini Satyricon 2:02; 12. I Clowns 5:30; 13. Roma 3:58; 14. Amarcord (suite) 6:12; 15. Il Casanova Di Federico Fellini (suite) 6:47; 16. Prova D'orchestra (suite) 3:57; 17. Fellini's Waltz 3:24	Original recordings, composed and arranged by Nino Rota; Carlo Savina (conductor)	CAM; Cat No: CAM 515348; 3 February 2006 Silva America; Catalog No: 1024	2006
Nino Rota: Music for Fellini, Part 1 1952 to 1958: 1. Lo sceicco bianco 1:21; 2. I vitelloni - suite 4:40; 3. La Tema della strada 1:54; 4. La E' arrivato Zampanò 1:35; 5. La Gelsomina 1:08; 6. La trattoria 4:17; 7. La Il bambino malato 1:10; 8. La Io mie ne vado! 0:52; 9. La I tre suonatori - Le processione 1:51; 10. La Il matto sul filo 1:54; 11. La Il viaggio continua 1:19; 12. Il bidone 3:18; 13. Il La moglie del bidonista 2:27; 14. Il tesoro nascosto 1:02; 15. Il Coimbra 5:46; 16. Il In viaggio per un bidone 1:56; 17. Il Al cinema 1:33; 18. Il Cara bambina 2:08; 19. Il Ballerina night 3:55; 20. Le L'ultimo bidone 2:58	Franco Ferrara (conductor); Fernando Previtali (conductor)	EL Records; Cat No: 192; 19 August 2010	2010
Romeo & Juliet Soundtrack	Dialogue highlights and the original score from the Franco Zeffirelli film; Music composed and conducted by Nino Rota; Lyrics for "What Is A Youth" by Eugene Walter	Capitol; Catalog No: 2993; 7 October 1968	1968
Nino Rota: Film Music Masterworks: The Godfather: The Godfather Waltz; The Taming of the Shrew: Overture; The Legend of the Glass Mountain; Romeo and Juliet: Love Theme; Death on the Nile: Nile Journey; Giulietta degli spiriti (Juliet of the Spirits); La Strada Ballet Suite; Fellini Satyricon; Casanova; Otto e mezzo (8 1/2); Amarcord: Suite; The Godfather theme	City of Prague Philharmonic Orchestra	Silva; Catalog No: SILCD2007; 23 July 2007	2007
The Film Music of Nino Rota; Original scores and transcriptions for piano: The Godfather; The Legend of the Glass Mountain; Fanciulle di lusso (Luxury Girls); Death on the Nile; Romeo and Juliet; Fantasmi a Roma (Ghosts in Rome); Obsession; Otto e mezzo (8 1/2); Il Gattopardo (The Leopard); Giulietta degli spiriti (Juliet of the Spirits); The Taming of the Shrew; Quel bandito sono io (Her favourite husband)	Massimo Palumbo (piano)	Chandos; Catalog No: CHAN9771; 25 January 2000	2000
Nino Rota: International Film Music: Romeo and Juliet; Nochi Kabirii; Rokko i ego brat'ya; Vosem' s polovinoj; Vaterloo; Il Gattopardo (The Leopard); Amarcord: Suite; Doroga; Rim; Casanova; Vojna i mir; Krestnyj otets	Academic Bolshoi Concert Orchestra of Russian State Music Centre of Radio and TV; Murad Kazlaev (conductor)	Olympia; Catalog No: MKM136	2003
Bravo Nino Rota music of Nino Rota from the films of Federico Fellini	Musical arrangement by Peter Dasent	Mana Music	2001
Nino Rota: Film Scores: 1. La Strada: Nozze in campagna - 'E arrivato Zampano'; 2. La Strada: I tre suonatori e il "Matto" sul filo 3. Il Gattopardo: Sostenuto appassionato - Finale; 4. La Strada: Rumba; 5. La Strada: Il circo (il numero di Zampano - I giocolieri - Il violino del "Matto"); 6. Guerra e Pace: Finale; 7. Il Gattopardo: Allegro impetuoso 8. La Strada: Zampano uccide il "Matto" - Gelsomina impazzisce di dolore 9. La Strada: Intermezzo - Solitudine e pianto di Zampano; 10. Guerra e Pace: La rosa di Novgorod; 11. La Strada: L'ultimo spettacolo sulla neve - "Addio Gelsomina"; 12. Il Gattopardo: Allegro maestoso 13. La Strada: La rabbia di Zampano; 14. Waterloo: Andante con moto - Alla marcia 15. Waterloo: Andante eroico - Tempo di Valzer; 16. Guerra e Pace: Introduzione - Valzer; 17. Waterloo: Andante alla marcia - Mosso, non troppo	Orchestre Philharmonique de Monte Carlo; Gianluigi Gelmetti (conductor)	EMI Classics; Cat: 0724357498722	2009
Tribute To Nino Rota: 1. La Strada (arranged by Marco Tamburini); 2. L'Amore Di Rocco (arranged by Marcello Tonolo); 3. I Vitelloni (arranged by Gianpaolo Casati); 4. Cadillac (arranged by Piero Tonolo); 5. Il Valzer Del Commiato (arranged by Marcello Tonolo); 6. Canzonetta (arranged by Piero Tonolo); 7. La Dolce Vita (arranged by Piero Leveratto); 8. Amarcord (arranged by Roberto Rossi)	Gap Band	Nelmondo	1995
Giovanna Canta Nino Rota: 1. La Strada, film score 2. Amarcord, film score 3. Le Notte di Cabiria, film score 4. Film Amore e D'anarchia, film score 5. La Dolce Vita, film score 6. 8 1/2, film score 7. Giulietta degli Spiriti, film score 8. Il Gattopardo, film score	Giovanna	Kicco Classics; Cat No: W 107481; 7 April 2009	2009
Tito Gobbi: The Glass Mountain: songs and arias from 'The Glass Mountain' by Nino Rota; highlights from 'Lucia di Lammermoor' by Gaetano Donizetti	Tito Gobbi; Elena Rizzieri; Louis Levy (conductor)	Bel Canto Society; Catalog No: 538; 15 February 2005	2005
Romeo And Juliet: Complete Score of the Franco Zeffirelli film classic	City of Prague Philharmonic Orchestra; Nic Raine (conductor)	Silva Screen; Catalog No: FILMCD358	2002
The Godfather Trilogy: I, II & III: Carmine Coppola (composer); Nino Rota (composer)	City of Prague Philharmonic Orchestra; Crouch End Festival Chorus; Paul Bateman (conductor)	Silva Screen; Catalog No: 1121; 13 March 2001	2001
Nino Rota: Music For Film: The Godfather; The Godfather: Part II; Otto e mezzo; La Dolce Vita; Prova D'Orchestra; Rocco E I Suoi Fratelli; Il Gattopardo	Filarmonica della Scala; Riccardo Muti (conductor); Massimo Colombo (keyboards); Giuseppe Bodanza (trumpet)	Sony; Cat No: SK 63359; 13 January 1998	1998
Nino Rota: Music Of Fellini Films: Amarcord; Roma; La Strada; 8 1/2	Suisse Romande Orchestra; Fabio Luisi (conductor)	Cascavelle; Cat No: 6134; 5 June 2001	2001
Severino Gazzelloni plays Nino Rota: 1. La Strada 3:09; 2. La Dolce Vita 4:11; 3. Rocco E I Suoi Fratelli 3:13; 4. Amarcord 3:13; 5. Il Padrino II 2:47; 6. Il Gattopardo 2:47; 7. Il Padrino 2:55; 8. Il Gattopardo 2:33; 9. Giulietta Degli Spiriti 2:35; 10. Romeo E Giulietta 3:07; 11. Il Gattopardo 3:05; 12. Otto E Mezzo 2:45	Severino Gazzelloni (flute)	CAM; Cat No: CAM 493397; 1 January 1993	1993
Cinema Italiano: Music of Ennio Morricone and Nino Rota Soundtrack: 1. The Untouchables; 2. La Dolce Vita; 3. First Youth; 4. Love Theme (Composed by Andrea Morricone); 5. Cinema Paradiso Theme; 6. Bevete Piu Latte (Drink More Milk); 7. Man with a Harmonica; 8. Once Upon a Time in the West; 9. Amarcord; 10. The Mission / Gabriel's Oboe; 11. The Clowns; 12. Romeo and Juliet; 13. Deborah's Theme; 14. Michael's Theme; 15. The Godfather Waltz; 16. The Godfather Theme	Henry Mancini & His Pops Orchestra; Henry Mancini (arranger, piano); Mitch Dalton (guitar); John Underwood (viola); David Theodore (oboe, English horn); The Ambrosian Singers	RCA; 30 October 1990	1990
Amarcord Nino Rota (I Remember Nino Rota)	Arrangements by: Carla Bley, David Amram, Muhal Richard Abrams, William Fischer, Chris Stein, Michael Sahl, and Sharon Freeman; Solo Performances by: Jaki Byard, Steve Lacy, Bill Frisell, and Dave Samuels	Hannibal	1995
Dancing with Nino Rota, Ballando con Nino Rota: 1. Caracalla's (la Bersagliera) 2:42; 2. La Bella 1:41; 3. La Dolce Vita 2:39; 4. Tarantella 2:38; 5. Ricordi Di Paese 1:41; 6. In Viaggio Per Un Bidone 1:57; 7. Un Eroe Dei Nostri Tempi 1:27; 8. Terra Lontana (valzer) 2:46; 9. Milano E Nadia (boogie) 3:47; 10. Valzer Ai Laghi 2:37; 11. Come Tu Vuoi (slow) 3:56; 12. Carlotta's Galop 2:32; 13. Il Charleston Di Giulietta 1:29; 14. Quanto Mi Piace La Gradisca 3:09; 15. L' Uccello Magico A Roma 1:54; 16. Galopp 4:56; 17. Mazurka 1:49; 18. Controdanza 3:40; 19. Polka 1:38; 20. Quadriglia 2:35; 21. Galop 1:39; 22. Valzer Del Commiato 3:59	all-star quintet	CAM; Cat No: CAM 493280; 1 January 1995	1981
The Club Foot Orchestra Plays Nino Rota: 1. L' Illusionista 03:02; 2. Winter Fireworks 02:17; 3. Nell'ufficio Di Produzione Di Otto E Mezzo 05:52; 4. La Dolce Vita Via Veneto 00:59; 5. Via Veneto e Mobili 01:27; 6. Notturno O Mattutino 06:26; 7. Patricia - Dei Gladiatori 03:34; 8. Nights of Cabiria Suite 17:11; 9. Nostalgico Swing, No. 1 03:14; 10. Nostalgico Swing, No. 2 02:57; 11. La Dolce Vita 02:11; 12. Cimiterno/Cigolete/Cadillac/Carlota's Galop [Medley] 08:50; 13. Parlami Di Me 02:29	The Club Foot Orchestra	Rastascan Records; Cat: BRD 036; 8 August 1998	1998

== Chamber music ==
Album title and selections	Conductor/Artist(s)	Label	Year
Rota: Chamber Music: Trio for Clarinet, Cello and Piano; Sonata for Viola and Piano No. 1 in G major (1935); Trio for Flute, Violin and Piano; Sonata for Violin and Piano	Ensemble Nino Rota; Paolo Beltramini; Cecilia Radic; Massimo Palumbo (piano)	Chandos; Catalog No: CHAN9832; 22 September 2000	2000
Nino Rota Chamber Music: Sonata for Flute and Harp (1937); Trio for Clarinet, Cello and Piano (1973); String Quartet (1948–54); Quintet for Flute, Oboe, Viola, Cello and Harp (1935); Trio for Flute, Violin and Piano (1958); Piccola Offerta Musicale for Wind Quintet (1943)	Ex Novo Ensemble	ASV; Cat No: DCA 1072; 1999	1999
Rota: Chamber Music for Flute: Duets (3) for flute & oboe 5:27; Pieces (5) for flute & piano 13:55; Sonata for flute & harp 12:55; Quintet for flute, oboe, viola, cello & harp 14:35	Cristina Bianchi; Marco Bianchi; Marco Testori; Marino Bedetti; Mario Carbotta	Dynamic; Catalog No: 172; 1999	1999
Nino Rota - Kremerata Musica: Piccola Offerta Musicale for wind quintet; Sarabanda e Toccata for harp; Trio for Flute, Violin and Piano; Ippolito gioca per Pianoforte; Il Presepio for soprano and string quartet; Catilena from Sette pezzi per bambini for piano solo; Intermezzo per Viola e Pianoforte; Puccettino nella giungla from Sette pezzi per bambini for piano solo; Nonetto	Kremerata Musica; Hagen String Quartet; Anna Maria Pammer (soprano), Sharon Bezaly (flute), Felix Renggli (flute), Markus Deuter (oboe), Heinz Holliger (oboe), Bernhard Zachhuber (clarinet), Elmar Schmid (clarinet), Volker Altmann (horn), Radovan Vlatkovic (horn), Lorelei Dowling (bassoon), Klaus Thunemann (bassoon), Maria Graf (harp), Gidon Kremer (violin), Hanna Weinmeister (violin), Firmiam Lermer (viola), Gérard Caussé (viola), Howard Penny (cello), Erich Hehenberger (double bass), Oleg Maisenberg (piano), Marino Formenti (piano), Mascha Smirnov (piano), Alena Chernushenko (piano)	BIS; Catalog No: CD870; 7 September 2000	2000
Nino Rota: Improvviso/Albatros Ensemble: Trio for Flute, Violin and Piano; Sonata for Flute and Harp; Improvviso for Violin and Piano "Amanti senza amore"; Tre pezzi per due flauti; Cinque pezzi facili per flauto e pianoforte; Allegro veloce; Sonata for Violin and Piano; Abate: Rotafantasy	Trio Albatros Ensemble	Stradivarius; Catalog No: STR33790; 8 July 2008	2008
Malpiero, Rota & Respighi: Three Italian String Quartets: Malipiero: String Quartet No. 3 'Cantari alla madrigalesca'; Respighi: String Quartet in D major; Rota: String Quartet	Nuovo Nuovo Quartetto Italiano	Claves; Catalog No: 509617; 1 February 2002	2002
Nino Rota - Complete music for viola & violin and piano: Intermezzo per Viola e Pianoforte; Sonata for Viola and Piano No. 2 in C major (1945); Sonata for Viola and Piano No. 1 in G major (1935); Sonata for Violin and Piano; Improvviso for Violin and Piano "Un diavolo sentimentale"; Improvviso for Violin and Piano "Amanti senza amore"	Marco Fornaciari (viola/violin); Gabriele Baldocci (piano)	Arts; Catalog No: 477188; 26 November 2007	2007
The Violin Sonata Around 1900 / Van Keulen, Brauigam: Respighi: Violin Sonata in B minor; Rota: Sonata for Violin and Piano; R. Strauss: Violin Sonata in E flat major, Op. 18	Isabelle van Keulen (violin); Ronald Brautigam (piano)	Challenge Classics; Catalog No: CC72307; 8 September 2009	2009
Nino Rota - Piano Music: Ippolito gioca per Pianoforte; Fantasia in G; Ballo della villanotta in erba; Suite from Fellini’s Casanova; 15 Preludes; Valse lento molto cantabile, un poco liberamente	Michelangelo Carbonara (piano)	Brilliant Classics; Catalog No: 9097; 15 June 2009	2009
Corigliano, Rota & Korngold: Works for Piano: Corigliano: Etude Fantasy; Korngold: Piano Concerto for the Left Hand (Korngold); Rota: 15 Preludes	Jimmy Brière (piano)	Analekta; Catalog No: AN29973; 14 September 2010	2010
Nina Rota Plays Nino Rota: 13 preludes for piano; Amarcord; The Godfather, Part II; Fellini, 8 1/2; Trio for clarinet, cello, and piano	Nino Rota; Trio Electra	Istituto Discografico Italiano; Catalog No: IDIS 335; 1 March 2000	2000
Luis Bacalov plays Nino Rota: 1. Quindici Preludi Per Pianoforte 21:56; 2. Venusia O Venezia, Venaga 3:48; 3. L' Uccello Magico 2:21; 4. L' Intermezzo Della Mantide Religiosa 3:17; 5. The Great Mouna 1:59; 6. Il Duca Di Württemberg 3:46; 7. La Poupee Automate 2:05	Luis Bacalov	CAM; Cat No: CAM 493398; 1 January 1994	1994
The Sacred Heart of Nino Rota: 1. Cantico in Memoria di Alfredo Casella; 2. Ave Maria; 3. Salve Regina; 4. Audi Judex; 5. La Passione; 6. Quando Tu Sollevi La Lampada Al Cielo; 7. Binus Potus; 8. Salmo IC; 9. Salmo VI; 10. Psallite Nato de Maria Virgine; 11. Quinque Prudentes Virgines; 12. Vigilate et Orate; 13. Andante Sostenuto per Flauto e Arpa; 14. Il Presepio	Choral music: Rachel Santesso (soprano); Sara Mingardo (contralto); Christopher Lemmings (tenor); Hugh Webb (harp); Emma Williams (flute); Andrew Crowley (trumpet); Mark Issyse (piano); Peter Lutkoski (guitar); Pordenone String Quartet; Cristiano Dell'Oste; Tim Wakerell (organ); Farm Street Choir	Zitto Music; Catalog No: ZTO 1077; 12 November 2007	2007

== Orchestral music ==
Album title and selections	Conductor/Artist(s)	Label	Year
Nino Rota: Cello Concertos Nos. 1 & 2	Orchestra Sinfonica Nazionale della RAI; Corrado Roviris(conductor); Silvia Chiesa	Sony Classical; Catalog No: 88697924102; 29 Aug 2011	2011
Nino Rota: Concertos: Harp Concerto, Luisa Prandina (harp); Bassoon Concerto, Paolo Carlini (bassoon); Castel del Monte - ballad for horn & orchestra Guido Corti (horn); Trombone Concerto, Andrea Conti (trombone)	I Virtuosi Italiani; Marzio Conti (conductor)	Chandos; Catalog No: CHAN9954; 23 April 2002	2002
Rota: La Strada; Concerto per Archi; "Il Gattopardo"	Orchestra del Teatro alla Scala di Milano; Riccardo Muti (conductor)	Sony Classical; 2 May 1995	1995
Rota La Strada: La Strada; Harp Concerto; Trombone Concerto	Orchestre Métropolitain (OM); Yannick Nézet-Séguin (conductor); Jennifer Swartz (harp); Alain Trudel (trombone)	ATMA; Catalog No: ACD22294; 27 March 2003	2003
Rota: Two Piano Concertos: Piano Concerto in E minor ('Piccolo mondo antico') (1979); Piano concerto in C major (1959–1962)	I Virtuosi Italiani; Marco Boni (conductor); Massimo Palumbo (piano)	Chandos; Catalog No: CHAN9681; 20 October 1998	1998
Rota: 2 Concerti Per Pianoforte: Piano Concerto in E minor (1979); Piano concerto in C major (1959–1962)	La Scala Philharmonic; Riccardo Muti (conductor); Giorgia Tomassi (Piano)	Emi Classics; Catalog No: 56869; 1 February 2000	2000
Nino Rota: Symphony No. 3; Concerto Festivo; Le Molière Imaginaire Suite: Symphony No. 3; Concerto festivo (Concerto for Orchestra in F major); Le Molière imaginaire - Ballet Suite	Norrkoping Symphony Orchestra; Ole Kristian Ruud (conductor); Hannu Koivula (conductor)	BIS; Catalog No: CD1070; 1 August 2001	2001
Nino Rota: Concerto For Strings; La Strada Ballet Suite; Dances from Il gattopardo: "La Strada" Ballet Suite (1966/1978); Concerto for Strings (1964–1965); Dances from "Il gattopardo" (1963)	La Scala Philharmonic; Riccardo Muti (conductor)	Sony; Catalog No: 66279; 2 May 1995	1995
Rota: Concerto For Cello No 2, Concerto For Strings, Clarinet Trio: Cello Concerto No. 2; Concerto for Strings; Trio for Clarinet, Cello and Piano	I Musici di Parma; Enrico Bronzi (cello and direction); Alessandro Carbonare (clarinet); Alberto Miodini (piano)	Concerto; Catalog No: CD2043; 30 June 2009	2009
Nino Rota: Aram Khachaturian: Aram Khachaturian: Piano Concerto in D flat major; Rota: Piano Concerto in E minor	Orchestra de Cordoba; Elena Herrera (conductor); Ana Claudia Girotto (piano)	Lindoro; Catalog No: AA0101; 12 June 2006	2006
Rota: Fantasia 'Don Giovanni': Fantasia 'Don Giovanni'; L'oeuvre pour piano; Concerto Soirée for piano & orchestra	Orchestra Cittá di Ferrara; Giuseppe Grazioli (conductor); Danielle Laval (piano)	Naive; Catalog No: V1003; 9 September 2002	2002
Yannick Nézet-Séguin Conducts Rota And Weill: Rota: La Strada; Weill: Symphony No. 2 'Symphonic Fantasy	Orchestre Métropolitain; Yannick Nézet-Séguin (conductor)	ATMA Classique; Cat No: ALCD21036; 26 December 2006	2006
Nino Rota: Symphonies Nos. 1 & 2: Symphony No. 1 in G major; Symphony No. 2 in F major Tarantina - Anni di pellegrinaggio	Filarmonica '900; Marzio Conti (conductor)	Chandos; Cat No: CHAN10546; 30 June |2009	2009
Nino Rota: Symphony No. 3: Symphony No. 3; Concerto Soirée for piano & orchestra; Divertimento concertante for double-bass and orchestra	Filarmonica '900; Gianandrea Noseda (conductor); Davide Botto (double-bass); Barry Douglas (piano)	Chandos; Cat No: CHAN10669; 26 April 2011	2011
Rota: Symphonies Nos. 1 & 2: Symphony No. 1 in G major; Symphony No. 2 in F major Tarantina - Anni di pellegrinaggio	Norrkoping Symphony Orchestra; Ole Kristian Ruud (conductor)	BIS; Catalog No: CD970; 1 November 1998	1998
Rota: Sinfonia sopra una canzone d'amore	Orchestra Sinfonica Siciliana; Massimo De Bernart (conductor); Mario Folena (flute); Benedetto Lupo (piano)	Arts Music; Catalog No: 47596; 6 November 2007	2007
Nino Rota: La Strada, Etc.: La Strada Ballet Suite; Sinfonia sopra una canzone d'amore; Waltzes from 'Il Gattopardo'	Orchestra Sinfonica del Teatro Massimo di Palermo; Marzio Conti (conductor); Salvatore Greco (violin); Salvatore Piazza	Chandos; Catalog No: CHAN10090; 16 June 2003	2003
Rota: La Vita di Maria: This is a DVD video; Filmed at the Basilica di Santa Maria Sopra Minerva, Rome	Orchestra Sinfonica Della Magna Grecia; Giovanni Di Stefano (conductor); with: Rosita Frisani, Ivano Constantino, Filippo Giudice, Antonio Stragapede & Barbara Labruna	Pan Dream; Catalog No: PDL1034; 13 November 2006	2006
La Vita di Maria	The Prague Symphony Orchestra (conducted by Nino Rota); The Prague Philharmonic Chorus (conducted by Josef Veselka); The Chorus of Treble Voices (conducted by Renata Cortiglioni)	CAM; Cat No: CAM 493062; 1 January 1995	1995
Rota: La Strada, Il Gattopardo, Concerto Soirée	Granada City Orchestra; Josep Pons (conductor); Benedetto Lupo	Harmonia Mundi; Cat No: 901864; 12 July 2005	2005

== Opera ==
Album title and selections	Conductor/Artist(s)	Label	Year
Rota: I Due Timidi, La Notte Di Un Nevrastenico	Venice Philharmonic Orchestra "G.F. Malipiero"; Rovigo Teatro Sociale Chorus; Flavio Emilio Scogna (conductor); with: Paolo Drigo, Lorenzo Battagion, Nunzio Galli, Sabrina Testa, Shin Joung-Hoon, Roberta Caly	Bongiovanni; Cat No: GB2367/68; 1 March 2005	2005
Rota: Il cappello di paglia di Firenze (The Italian Straw Hat)	Choeur et Orchestre du Theatre Royal de la Monnaie; Elio Boncompagni (conductor); Magda Olivero (soprano); Mariella Devia (soprano); Edoardo Giménez (tenor); Gianni Socci, Dolores Crivellari, Manuel Gonzales, Federico Davia, Augusto Pedroni, and Katerina Moesen	Opera D'oro; Cat No: 1420; 4 January 2005	2005 -
