= Sibille =

Sibille is both a surname and a given name. Notable people with the name include:

Surname:

- Constance Sibille (born 1990), French tennis player
- Madeleine Sibille (1895–1984), French opera singer
- Pietro Sibille (born 1977), Peruvian actor
- Ray Sibille (born 1952), American jockey
- Roselyne Sibille (born 1953), French poet

Given name:

- Sibille Attar (born 1981), Swedish singer of French origin

== See also ==
- Sibyl (disambiguation)
- Cybil (disambiguation)
- Sibylla (disambiguation)
- Sibylle (disambiguation)
