= Rendine =

Rendine is a surname of Italian origin. Notable people with the surname include:

- Furio Rendine (1920–1987), Italian composer, lyricist, producer, organizer and conductor
- Sergio Rendine (1954–2023), Italian composer of operas, symphonic, ballet and chamber music, music manager, theatre director, son of Furio
