= Pille =

Pille may refer to:

- Pille (given name)
- Pille, Võru County
- Goleo and Pille
