= Flügge =

Flügge, Flugge or Flüggé is a surname. Notable people with the surname include:

- Carl Flügge (1847–1923), German bacteriologist
- Johannes Flüggé (1775–1816), German botanist and physician
- Klaus Flugge (born 1934), German-born British publisher
- Sibylla Flügge (born 1950), German lawyer
- Siegfried Flügge (1912–1997), German physicist
- Wilhelm Flügge (1904–1990), German engineer
- Irmgard Flügge-Lotz (1903–1974), German mathematician
