= Sibilla =

Sibilla may refer to:

- Monte Sibilla, a mountain of Marche, Italy
- Grotta della Sibilla, a cave in the Sibillini Mountains
- Italian corvette Sibilla

== People with the given name ==
- Sibilla Aleramo (1876–1960), Italian feminist and writer
- Sibillina Biscossi (1287-1367), Italian nun, recluse and mystic
- Sibilla (1954), Italian singer
- Sibilla Di Vincenzo (born 1983), Italian racewalker

== See also ==
- Sibila, a village in Mali
- Sibylla (disambiguation)
