= Sibyl (disambiguation) =

A Sibyl was an oracular woman believed to possess prophetic powers in ancient Greece, first at Delphi.

- Cumaean Sibyl
- Delphic Sibyl
- Erythraean Sibyl
- Hellespontine Sibyl
- Phrygian Sibyl

Sybil or Sibyl may also refer to:

== Films ==
- Sybil (1921 film)
- Sybil (1976 film), a film starring Sally Field
- Sybil (2007 film), a remake of the 1976 film starring Tammy Blanchard and Jessica Lange
- Sibyl (2019 film), a French comedy-drama film

== Literature ==
- The Sibyl (play), a tragedy by Richard Cumberland, published in 1813
- Sybil (novel) or The Two Nations, an 1845 novel by Benjamin Disraeli
- Sybil (Schreiber book), a book by Flora Rheta Schreiber about Shirley Ardell Mason, an alleged sufferer from multiple personality disorder
- Sybil, a 1952 novel by Louis Auchincloss
- The Sybil or Sibyllan, a 1956 Swedish novel by Pär Lagerkvist
- The Sybil, an American dress reform periodical founded by Lydia Sayer Hasbrouck

== Music ==
- Sybil (album), a 1989 album by American singer Sybil
- Sybil (operetta) adaptation of Szibill by Victor Jacobi
- Sibyl Vane (band), indie rock band from Pau, France created in 2002

== Science ==
- Sybil Island, one of the many uninhabited Canadian arctic islands in Qikiqtaaluk Region, Nunavut
- Sybil rock, outcropping of rock on the site of Delphi, Greece
- 4679 Sybil, minor planet (12 km diameter) discovered in 1990 by R. H. McNaught
- Typhoon Sibyl (1992)
- Typhoon Sibyl (1995)

== People ==
- Sybil (singer) (born 1963), or Sybil Lynch, American singer
- Sibyl of Armenia (died 1290), the princess of Antioch and countess of Tripoli
- Sibyl of Burgundy (1126–1150), Queen Consort of Sicily
- Sibyl of Falaise, kinswoman of King Henry I of England
- Sibyl de Neufmarché (1100–1143), Countess of Hereford, suo jure Lady of Brecknock, Cambro-Norman noblewoman
- Sybil (wife of Pain fitzJohn) (12th century), wife of Pain fitzJohn and Josce de Dinan
- Sybil (given name)

== Ships ==
- HMS Sibyl (1779), 28-gun Enterprise-class sixth-rate frigate of the Royal Navy
- SS Sybil (1901), a Uganda Railway Lake Victoria ferry scuttled in 1967
- HMS Sibyl (P217), an S class submarine
- HMS Sibyl (R15), C-class destroyer built for the Royal Navy during World War II
- Sybil Marston (ship), a wooden schooner cargo ship
- USS Sibyl (1863), wooden-hull steamer with heavy guns, purchased by the Union Navy during the American Civil War

== Other uses ==
- Sybil, a two-handed card flourish created by American magician Chris Kenner
- Sybil (cat) (2006–2009), cat living at 11 and 10 Downing Street in the United Kingdom
- Sybil attack, the use of stolen or forged multiple identities for defeating a reputation system
- Sibil, another name for Ngalum, a language of New Guinea
- Sibyl System, the primary system that judges individuals in the anime Psycho-Pass

== See also ==
- Cybil (disambiguation)
- Sibille (disambiguation)
- Sibylla (disambiguation)
- Sibylle (disambiguation)
- Sybil Vane (disambiguation)
- "The Song of the Sibyl", a Gregorian chant sung on Christmas Eve in Majorca
