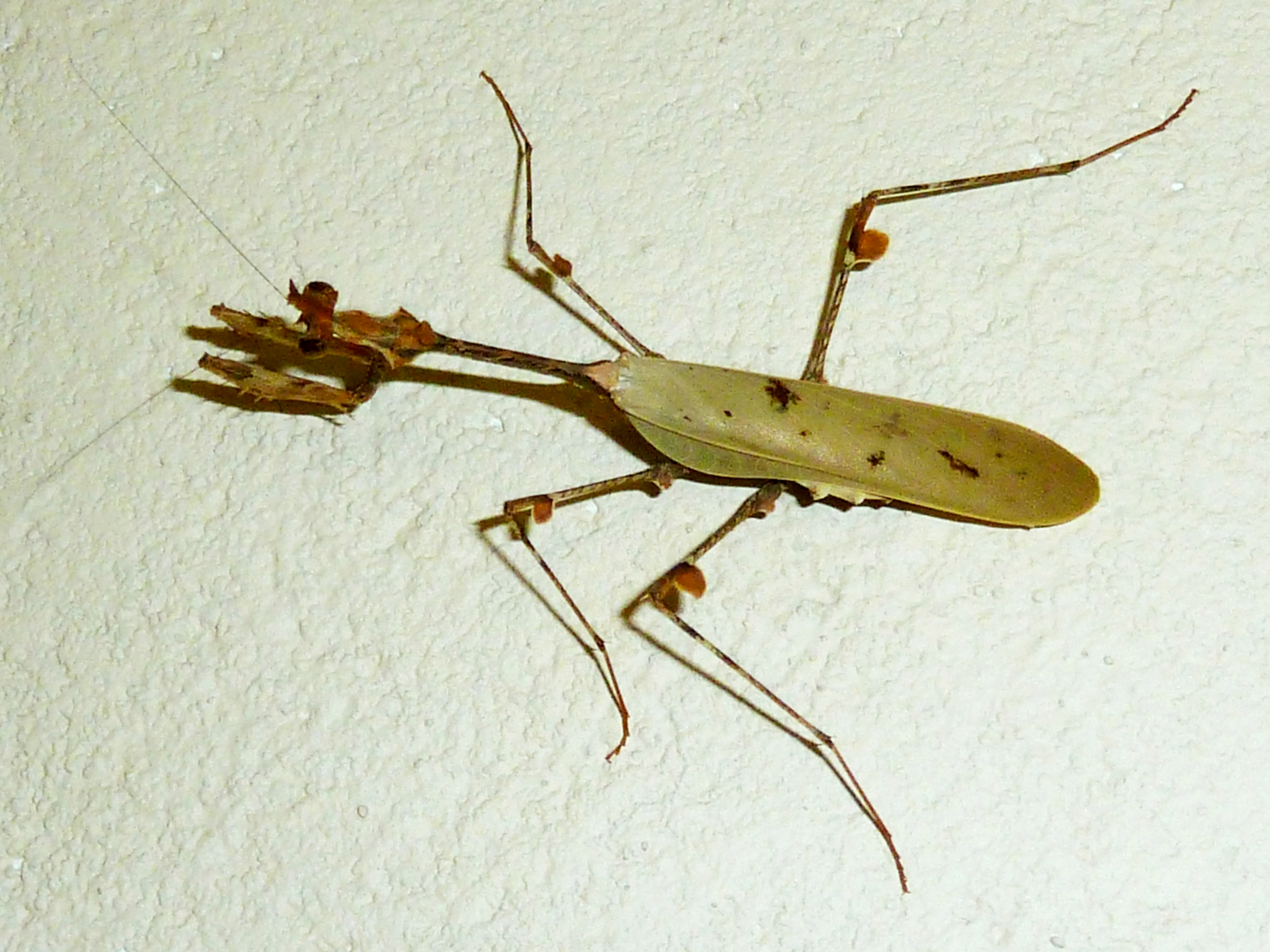

Scientific classification
- Kingdom: Animalia
- Phylum: Arthropoda
- Clade: Pancrustacea
- Class: Insecta
- Order: Mantodea
- Family: Hymenopodidae
- Subfamily: Sibyllinae
- Tribe: Sibylini
- Genus: Sibylla
- Species: S. pretiosa

Binomial name
- Sibylla pretiosa Stål, 1856

Synonyms
- Sibylla fuscosparsa F.Lombardo, 1997

= Sibylla pretiosa =

Cryptic mantis

Species of praying mantis

Sibylla pretiosa, commonly known as the cryptic mantis, is a species of mantis found in southern Africa. They have a long and thin prothorax. The distinctively ornamented species has projections on the head, prothorax, and four femora. They live on tree bark in woodlands.

== Description ==
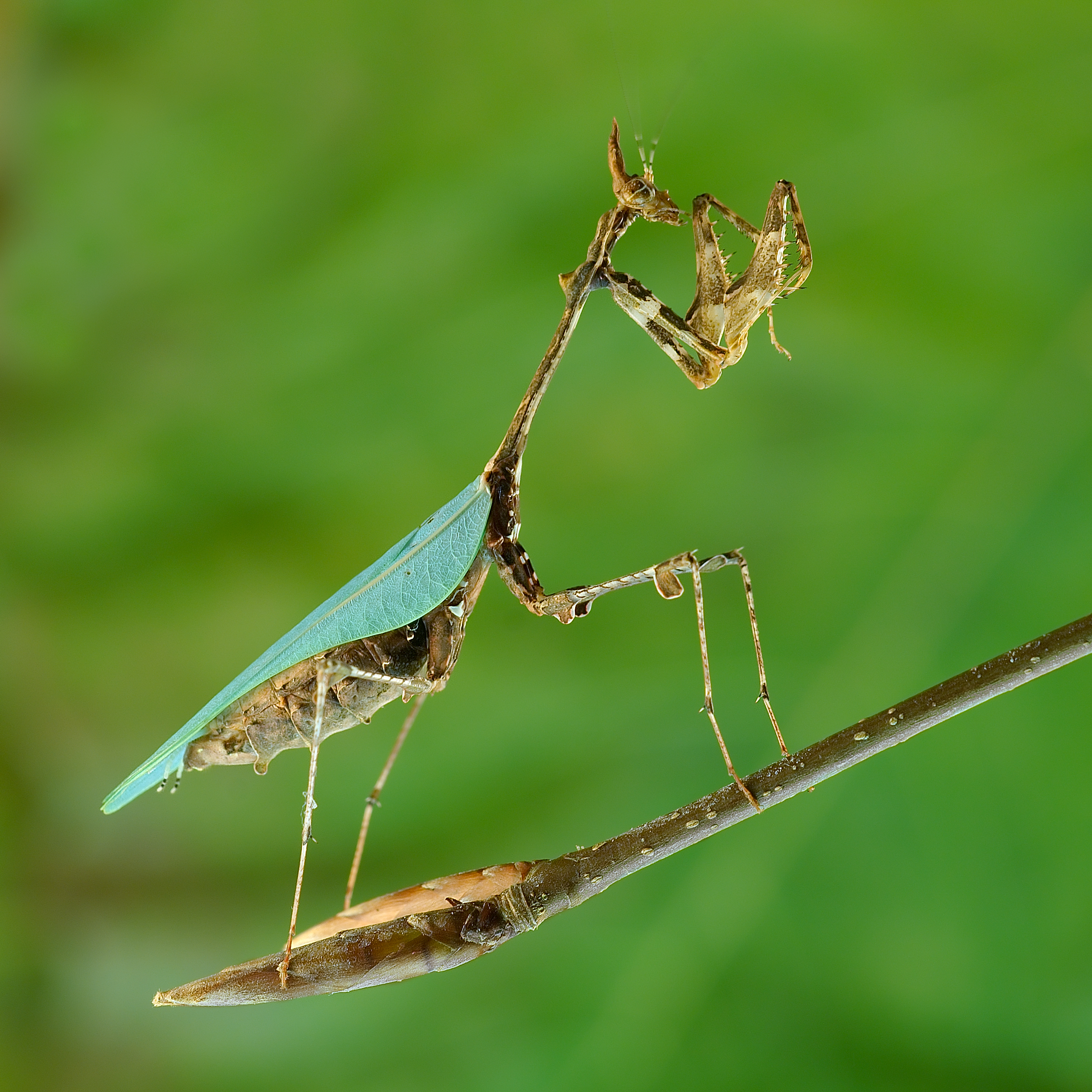
Side view

They have unusual leaf-like femoral projections near the joints of their four walking legs. Adults are distinguished from most other mantis species by their leaf-like wings, generally the only green portion of the mantis's otherwise brown and mottled exoskeleton. The thorax of the cryptic mantis is very thin and elongated, similar to that of the wandering violin mantis, Gongylus gongylodes. Adult females generally reach 5–6 cm (2.0–2.4 in) in length, while the males are generally about 1 cm (0.4 in) smaller. The lifespan of the wild cryptic mantis is unknown, but they have been known to live up to nine months in captivity (wild mantises likely live slightly longer, a year and a few months).

== Feeding habits ==
The mantis almost exclusively eats flying prey, with Drosophila melanogaster fruit flies being the food of preference for young nymphs in captivity. Adults and fifth- or sixth-instar nymphs can tackle much larger prey, such as house flies, small bees, and moths.
