= Sibylla operosa =

Scientific classification
- Kingdom: Animalia
- Phylum: Arthropoda
- Clade: Pancrustacea
- Class: Insecta
- Order: Mantodea
- Family: Hymenopodidae
- Genus: Sibylla
- Species: S. operosa

Binomial name
- Sibylla operosa R. Roy, 1996

Species of African mantis

Sibylla operosa is a species of African mantis in the Sibyllopsis subgenus. It was first described by R. Roy in 1996.

== See also ==
- List of mantis genera and species
