= Karthika Naïr =

French-Indian poet and dancer

Karthika Naïr (born 1972) is a French-Indian poet and dance producer and curator. Her notable works include Until the Lions: Echoes from the Mahabharata, published by HarperCollins India and Arc Publications in 2015. She is India's only poet to have won a literary award for fiction for a work of poetry.

== Early life and education ==
Karthika Naïr was born in 1972 in Kottayam, Kerala. ^{[1]} Her father was an officer in the Indian Army, so she moved around much during her childhood. She spoke in English with her father and in Malayalam with her mother, the sing-song form of which influenced her poetry.

She was born with the rare and chronic genetic condition epidermolysis bullosa and was often sick and hospitalised for surgeries growing up. She stayed at home much because of her illness and engaged in reading books that her parents often bought.

When she was around 16 years old, she had a feeding tube inserted into her and was subsequently unable to attend college. Instead, she began to pursue a sociology degree through the Indira Gandhi National Open University (IGNOU).

Her parents worried that she would become depressed doing a long course, so they enrolled her at a course at the Alliance Française in Thiruvananthapuram, where her family lived at the time. That was also when she started writing articles for newspapers.

In 1997, she began working with Alliance Française as a press attaché, and her writing was temporarily put on pause. Naïr says learning French changed the trajectory of her life. She was sent on a Ministry of Culture scholarship to France for a short course in cultural policy, where she discovered her interest in arts management, and in 2000 she returned to France to pursue a post-master's degree in Arts management. She stayed in Paris.

== Works ==
Naïr has published both poetry and prose and written scripts for dance productions. Her poetry has been widely anthologised across the world including in Granta, Prairie Schooner, Poetry Review (UK), The Literary Review (USA), Poetry International, Indian Literature, The Bloodaxe Book of Contemporary Indian Poets and the Forward Book of Poetry 2017.

=== Books ===
- La Zon-Mai: parcours nomades, Actes-Sud (France, 2007) (co-author)
- The Honey Hunter/Le Tigre de Miel (Young Zubaan, India/Editions Hélium, France, 2013)
- Electric Birds of Pothakudi (Joëlle Jolivet, illus.) (Tate, 2025)

=== Poetry ===
- Bearings (HarperCollins India, 2009)
- Until the Lions: Echoes from the Mahabharata (HarperCollins India/Arc Publications UK, 2015)

=== Scripts ===
- DESH (2011)
- Chotto Desh (2015)

=== Translations ===
- On the Other Side of the Shadow by Roselyne Sibille
- The Shadow Rises before Me by Roselyne Sibille
- The Shadow Steps Forward by Roselyne Sibille
- The Shadow Moans by Roselyne Sibille
- The Shadow is a Ridgeline by Roselyne Sibille
- He Gazes Uncomprehendingly by Roselyne Sibille
- Hope, une exposition d'art contemporain sur l'espoir. (Flammarion, 2010) (co-translator)

== Process ==
Naïr took five years to complete Until the Lions. In an interview with The Hindu, she said, "The first two were devoted entirely to reading/watching/hearing material on the Mahabharata, whether regional versions, retellings, stage and film adaptations or academic papers." Where she could not find source material in France, like P.K. Balakrishnan’s Ini Njan Urangatte (I Can Sleep Now), her parents read it to her over Skype.

She has said in interviews that her work as a dance producer and curator influences her poetry. Poetry International says about her work: "The proximity to performing arts, and to dance in particular, is evident in much of Naïr's poetry, which presents a striking blend of density and mercurial fluidity."

Many poems in her first collection, Bearings, were ekphrastic and drew from existing performances.

Naïr has been influenced by choreographers Anne Teresa De Keersmaeker, Rachid Ouramdane and Gregory Maqoma, and the French opera director Patrice Chéreau.

== Awards ==
- Tata Literature Live! Award (2015) – Until the Lions: Echoes from the Mahabharata

Until the Lions: Echoes from the Mahabharata was also shortlisted for the Atta Galatta Prize (2016)

Naïr was also the principal scriptwriter for DESH (2011), a multiple-award-winning production.

Electric Birds of Pothakudi was a finalist for the 2026 Kirkus Prize for Young Readers.
