= Pille (given name) =

Female given name

- Gender: Female
- Language: Estonian
- Name day: 30 March

Origin
- Origin: From the German language feminine given name Sibylle/Sibylla
- Region of origin: Estonia

Other names
- Derived: From the Latin sibylla, derived from the Ancient Greek Σίβυλλα (sibylla).
- Related names: Sibülle

Pille is an Estonian feminine given name; a cognate and occasional diminutive of the given name Sibülle.

The first name Pille appears in Estonian folk songs and in church registers in the 18th and 19th centuries and was an Estonian-language variant of the German given name Sibylle/Sibylla, which itself is derived from the Latin sibylla, and in turn from the Ancient Greek Σίβυλλα (sibylla). After largely falling out of usage, the name was revived in 1929 in the recommended list of names by the Estonian Mother Tongue Society (Emakeele Seltsi). It became a widely popular name following 1955.

As of 1 January 2021, 2,532 women in Estonia have the first name Pille, making it the 55th most popular female name in the country. The name is most common in the 50–54 age group, and most commonly found in Järva County, where 30.79 per 10,000 inhabitants of the county bear the name.

Individuals bearing the name Pille include:

- Pille Lill (born 1962), opera soprano
- Pille Lukin-Kangur (born 1973), actress
- Pille Pürg (born 1972), actress and comedian
- Pille Raadik (born 1987), footballer
- Pille Saar (born 1961), pianist and educator
- Pille Tomson (born 1960), nature conservationist
- Pille Valk (1959–2009), historian and theologian
