= Roselyne Sibille =

French poet (born 1953)

Roselyne Sibille is a French poet who was born on July 28, 1953, in Salon-de-Provence (France). She studied geography, and then worked as a librarian before running creative writing workshops. She lives in Provence where she writes on her approach to the human being in connection with self and nature. She leads writing workgroups for the association "Share horizons"(Partage d'horizons). She has been organizing writing workshops in the Sahara Desert for the association "Wind's friend" (L'Ami du Vent).

== Selected works ==
=== Books ===
- 2001 Au chant des transparences, wash-drawings by Bang Hai Ja – Publisher: Voix d’encre.
- 2002 Éclats de Corée – Publisher: Tarabuste (Anthology Anthologie Triages, with the participation of the Book National Center)
- 2003 Trois jours d’avant-printemps au temple des sept Bouddhas – Magazine #64: « Culture coréenne » "Korean culture", Paris.
- 2005 Versants, prologue by Jamel Eddine Bencheikh – Publisher: Théétète(with the participation of the Book National Center).
- 2006 Préludes, fugues et symphonie, Publisher: Rapport d’Etape (Venice (Italy) French bookshop).
- 2007 Tournoiements, Publisher: Champ social
- 2007 Un sourire de soleil (story for children, bilingual) Publishing house (French-Japanese) published in Japan, translated by Masami Umeda, Hélène Simmen's photographs.
- 2009 Par la porte du silence / Through the door of silence, with paintings by Bang Hai Ja – Published for the exhibition in Gyeomjae Jeongseon memorial Museum in Séoul – (Trilingual : French-English-Korean) Translations by Moun Young-houn. (Korean) and Michael Fineberg (English)
- 2010 Lumière froissée, with paintings by Liliane-Eve Brendel – Publisher: Voix d’encre.
- 2011 Implore la lumière, with paintings by Sylvie Deparis – Publisher: SD
- 2012 L'appel Muet, Publisher: La Porte 2012 Pas d'ici, pas d'ailleurs : Anthologie poétique francophone de voix féminines contemporaines, Publisher: Voix d’encre
- 2013 La migration des papillons (co-writer Sabine Huynh), Publisher: La Porte
- 2014 Ombre monde. Roselyne Sibille – Publisher: Editions Moires(with the participation of the Book National Center).
- 2014 Chaque jour est une page, Publisher: La Porte

=== Magazines ===
- 2003 Trois jours d’avant-printemps au temple des sept Bouddhas – Magazine #64: « Culture coréenne » "Korean culture", Paris.
- 2010 Calmes aventures au Pays du Matin Calme – Magazine #80: « Culture coréenne » "Korean culture", Paris.
- 2010 Anthologie poétique « Terre de femmes »
- 2011 Les points cardinaux du temps – « Terre à ciel – Poésie d'aujourd'hui – Spéciale Jeunesse »
- 2011 L'Ombre-monde (extraits) / The shadow world (excerpt) – Translations by Karthika Naïr - « Pratilipi » - Bilingual Literary Journal – India
- 2012 Ombre-monde (extraits) / Shadow world (excerpt) – Translations by Karthika Naïr - « Asymptote » - International journal dedicated to literary translation and contemporary writing – India
- 2012 Les marchés de Corée: un présent multiple – Magazine #84: « Culture coréenne » "Korean culture", Paris.
- 2012 – Entre sable et ciel – Qantara #85 (Institut du monde arabe – Paris)
- 2013 – Levure littéraire #7 – Recours au poème #52 – Bacchanales #49 – Incertain regard #8
- 2014 – DiptYque #3 – Levure littéraire #9

== Creations and activities ==
ART BOOKS

co-créations with Youl – Laurence Bourgeois – Yannick Charon – Sylvie Deparis – Liliane-Eve Brendel – Florence Barberis – Bang Hai Ja – Hélène Baumel et Laurence Bourgeois Mireille Laborie – Brigitte Perol – Keun Eun-dol

GRAVURES

with Dominique Limon

SCULPTECRITURES

with Christine Le Moigne

INSTALLATION

by Liliane-Eve Brendel

COMPOSITION

by Maïté Erra

STAGE DIRECTIONS AND VOICE – PERFORMANCES

- December 2010 "Poetry Connections" – Poetry Festival (Chennai and Pune – India) with Lakshmi Bories
- January 2011 "Un éternel en mouvement": "Danced poetry" by Lakshmi Bories

WRITING RESIDENCIES

- 2009 and 2010: Association Païolive (Les Vans – Ardèche – France)
- September–October 2009: Cultural Center of the Foundation Toji (Wonju – South Korea)
- December 2010: Poetry translation workshop near Pondicherry – Literature Across Frontiers (Tamil Nadu – India)
- July – August 2011 – Cultural Center of the Foundation Toji (Wonju – South Korea)

== Exhibitions ==
=== Personal ===
- From October 29 until December 5, 2009, Exhibition "Par la porte du silence", (« Through the door of silence »), 26 poems translated into Korean by Moun Young-Houn, together with paintings by Bang Hai Jah (Toji Foundation of Culture – Wonju City, Kangwondo, South Korea)
- From December 22, 2009, until February 7, 2010: « Through the door of silence" (Gyeomjae Jeongson Memorial Museum – Seoul – South Korea)
- January 14 until January 21, 2011 – "Livres de dialogue" created with Youl (French alliance – Pondicherry) – India
- July 27 until August 3, 2011 – Entre racines et lumière, une danse, 13 poems translated into Korean by Moun Young-Houn, together with paintings by Sylvie Deparis and 23 "Poésies graphiques" by Roselyne Sibille, together with short poems translated into Korean by Moun Young-Houn (Toji Foundation of Culture – Wonju City, Kangwondo, South Korea)
- November 23 until December 10, 2011 – Poésie vivante: co-creations with 10 artists – (Médiathèque Ouest-Provence – Miramas – Bouches du Rhône – France)

=== Collective ===
- March–April–May 2009: exhibition of artworks created with Youl at the Musée Départemental of Gap – France (Gap – Hautes-Alpes – France)
- From May 29 until June 15, 2009, Exhibition of manuscript paintings created with Youl for the event "Trace of Poetry" (L’Isle sur la Sorgue – Vaucluse – France)
- From Mai 14 until July 23, 2011 – "Des artistes et des livres: le climat de l'artiste" – Médiathèque Ceccano (Avignon – Vaucluse – France)
