= Sibyl Vane =

Sibyl Vane may refer to:

- Sibyl Vane, a character in Oscar Wilde's novel The Picture of Dorian Gray
- Sibyl Vane, a character in Vladimir Nabokov's short story "The Vane Sisters"
- Sibyl Vane (band), a French indie rock band
- Sibyl Vane (Estonian band), an Estonian indie/alternative rock band
