= Cybil =

Cybil is a feminine personal name. It may refer to:

- Cybil Bennett, character in the Silent Hill media franchise
- Cybil (programming language)

== See also ==
- Cybill Shepherd, American actress
- Cybill, American TV series
- Cybils Award, in children's literature
- Sibille
- Sibyl (disambiguation)
- Sibylle (disambiguation)
