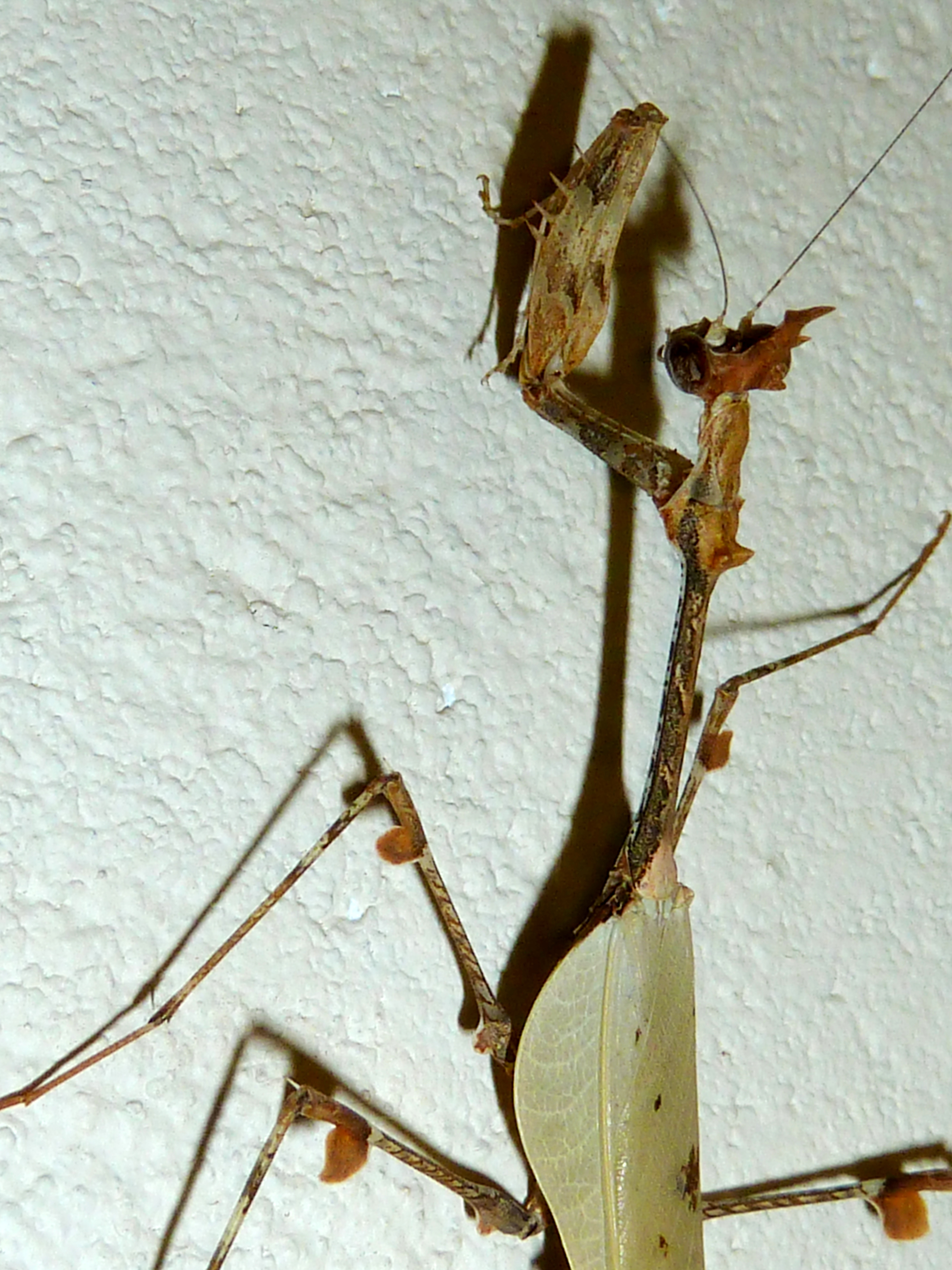
- S. pretiosa in South Africa

Scientific classification
- Kingdom: Animalia
- Phylum: Arthropoda
- Clade: Pancrustacea
- Class: Insecta
- Order: Mantodea
- Family: Hymenopodidae
- Tribe: Sibylini
- Genus: Sibylla; Stål, 1856

= Sibylla (mantis) =

Genus of praying mantises

Sibylla is a genus of mantises in the family Hymenopodidae and characteristic of the subfamily Sibyllinae.

== Description ==
Sibylla species have a long and thin prothorax with lateral and dorsal projections. The head bears an erect process with four sideways spikes.

== Classification ==
The Mantodea Species File lists:

Subgenus Sibylla

1. Sibylla dives (Giglio-Tos, 1915)
2. Sibylla dolosa (Roy, 1975)
3. Sibylla gratiosa (Rehn, 1912)
4. Sibylla limbata (Giglio-Tos, 1915)
5. Sibylla maculosa (Roy, 1996)
6. Sibylla marmorata (Roy, 1996)
7. Sibylla polyacantha (Gerstaecker, 1889)
8. Sibylla pretiosa (Stål, 1856) - type species

Subgenus Sibyllopsis

1. Sibylla griffinii (Giglio-Tos, 1915)
2. Sibylla operosa (Roy, 1996)
3. Sibylla pannulata (Karsch 1894)
4. Sibylla punctata (Roy, 1996)
5. Sibylla vanderplaetseni (Roy, 1963)

== See also ==
- List of mantis genera and species
