= Sibylla Flügge =

German lawyer and academic (born 1950)

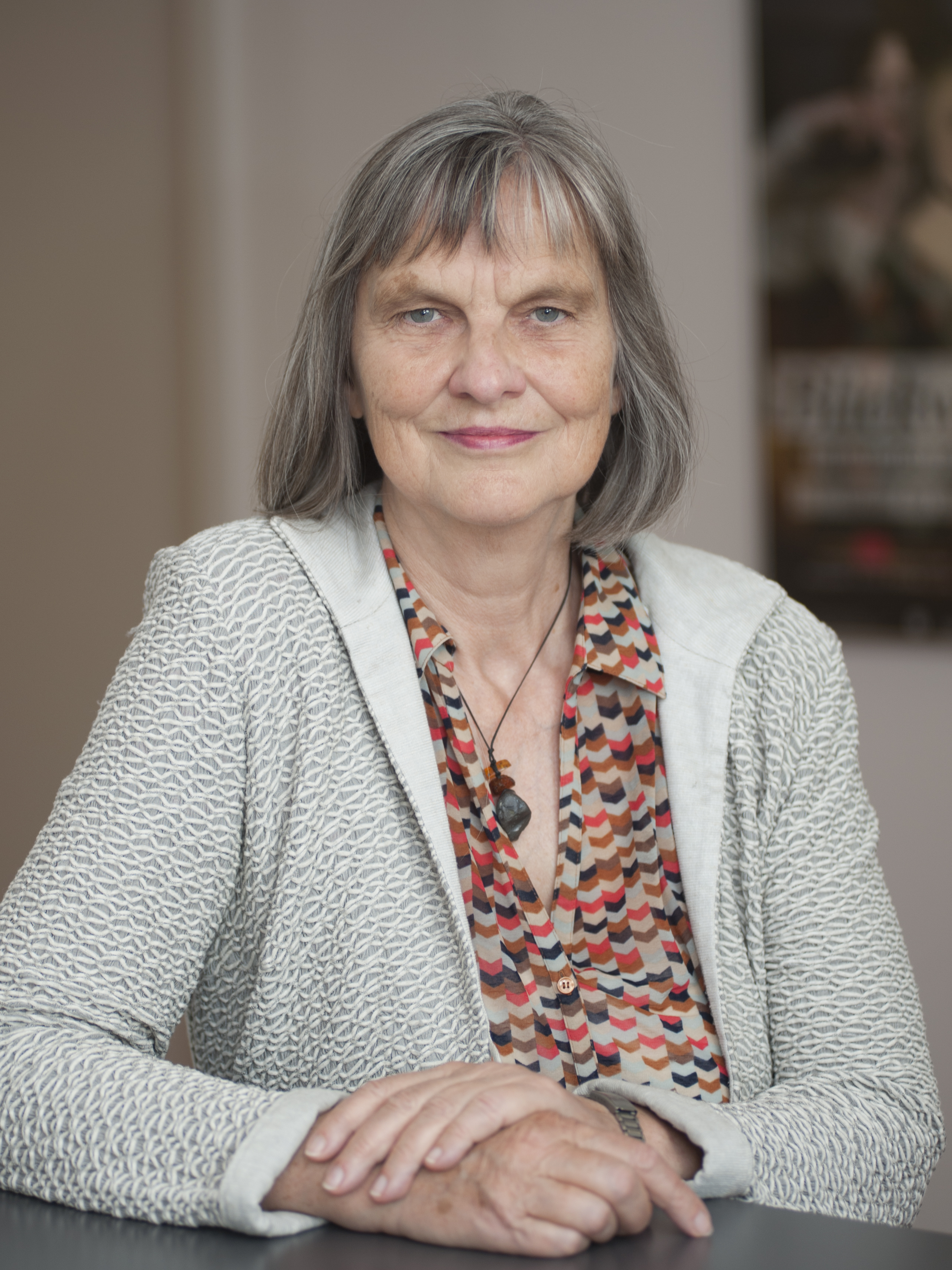
- Born: 1950 (age 75–76); Clausthal-Zellerfeld
- Known for: co-editor of the feminist legal magazine STREIT.

Sibylla Flügge (born 1950, Clausthal-Zellerfeld) is a German lawyer and retired professor at the Frankfurt University of Applied Sciences in the field of “Law of the Woman". She was a member of the Frankfurt Women's Council. Flügge is co-editor of the feminist legal magazine STREIT.

== Family ==
Flügge's parents are the lawyer and women's rights activist Marianne Flügge-Oeri and the pastor Rufus Flügge. She has two children who were born in 1977 and 1981. The father of her children is Karl Dietrich Wolff.

== Career ==
As a teenager, Flügge joined the left-wing student movement, took part in demonstrations and Easter Marches and was head girl at the Sophienschule Hannover, where she graduated from high school in 1969. From 1969 to 1974 she studied Law at the Johann Wolfgang Goethe University Frankfurt am Main and then completed a three-year legal traineeship at the Regional Court Frankfurt am Main. During her studies, women's rights became Flügge's central theme. From 1977 she worked as a lawyer.

In 1990 she became a consultant for health policy and prostitution in the Women's Department of the city of Frankfurt am Main, which was then newly founded by Margarethe Nimsch. She worked there under head of office Renate Krauß-Pötz until 1993. During her term in office, for example, the compulsory examination and compulsory registration of prostitutes in Frankfurt were abolished.

In her dissertation Midwives and healing women. Law and legal reality in the 15th and 16th centuries, Flügge dealt with the emergence of discrimination against women through law using the example of the history of midwifery law. Her analysis shows the historical processes leading to a gender-specific division of labor in medicine. Increasing hierarchy excluded women in Europe from academic medicine and obstetrics for a long time.

After her doctorate in 1994, Flügge was appointed professor with a focus on women's rights at the University of Applied Sciences Frankfurt am Main, where she worked in the department from 1994 to 2015. "Social work and health"' taught and was also women's representative from 1995 to 2014.

Her research areas are legal history, the emergence and history of discrimination against women in law with a focus on police law in the early modern period and family law in the 20th century, history of Women's legal demands as part of the new women's movement. In 2014, she was involved as a researcher in the “Sister Cities Going Gender” project run by the city of Frankfurt am Main, which dealt with the topic of “Gender Mainstreaming in Local Administration”.

Flügge is one of the first active feminist lawyers who have met annually since 1978. These have been organized by changing groups since 1985 as “Feminist Lawyer Days”. In 1983 she was co-founder and has since been co-editor of the feminist legal magazine STREIT and is still the final editor there today.

== Commitment to women's rights ==
In the early 1970s she joined the Frankfurt Women's Council, which met in Frankfurt's Club Voltaire. Der Weiberrat war eine Initiative, die aus dem Berliner Aktionsrat zur Befreiung der Frauen im Sozialistischen Deutschen Studentenbund (SDS) hervorging. According to her own statements, Sybilla Flügge, together with the American psychoanalyst and then student Jessica Benjamin, advocated making personal experiences the starting point for social analysis and politics.

She was also one of the organizers of the first nationwide women's congress of Aktion 218, which, as part of the women's movement on the initiative of Alice Schwarzer, aimed to abolish the ban on abortion according to § 218. Der Kongress fand im März 1972 im Frankfurter Haus der Jugend statt. Sie gehörte im Sommer 1973 auch zu den Begründerinnen des Frankfurter Frauenzentrums in der Eckenheimer Landstraße 72 – als zweites Frauenzentrum in Deutschland neben dem zuvor in Berlin gegründeten Frauenzentrum.

== Volunteering ==
Flügge worked on a voluntary basis on the board of the Frankfurt Institute for Women's Research, was a long-time member of the advisory board of the Frankfurt Feminist Women's Health Center and was a member of the scientific advisory board of the Women's Studies and Education Center of the Protestant Church in Germany (FSBZ, today Study Center for Gender Issues in Church and Theology). She is a member of the research ethics committee of the German Society for Social Work (DGSA).
