= Sibylle (painting) =

Painting by Jean-Baptiste-Camille Corot

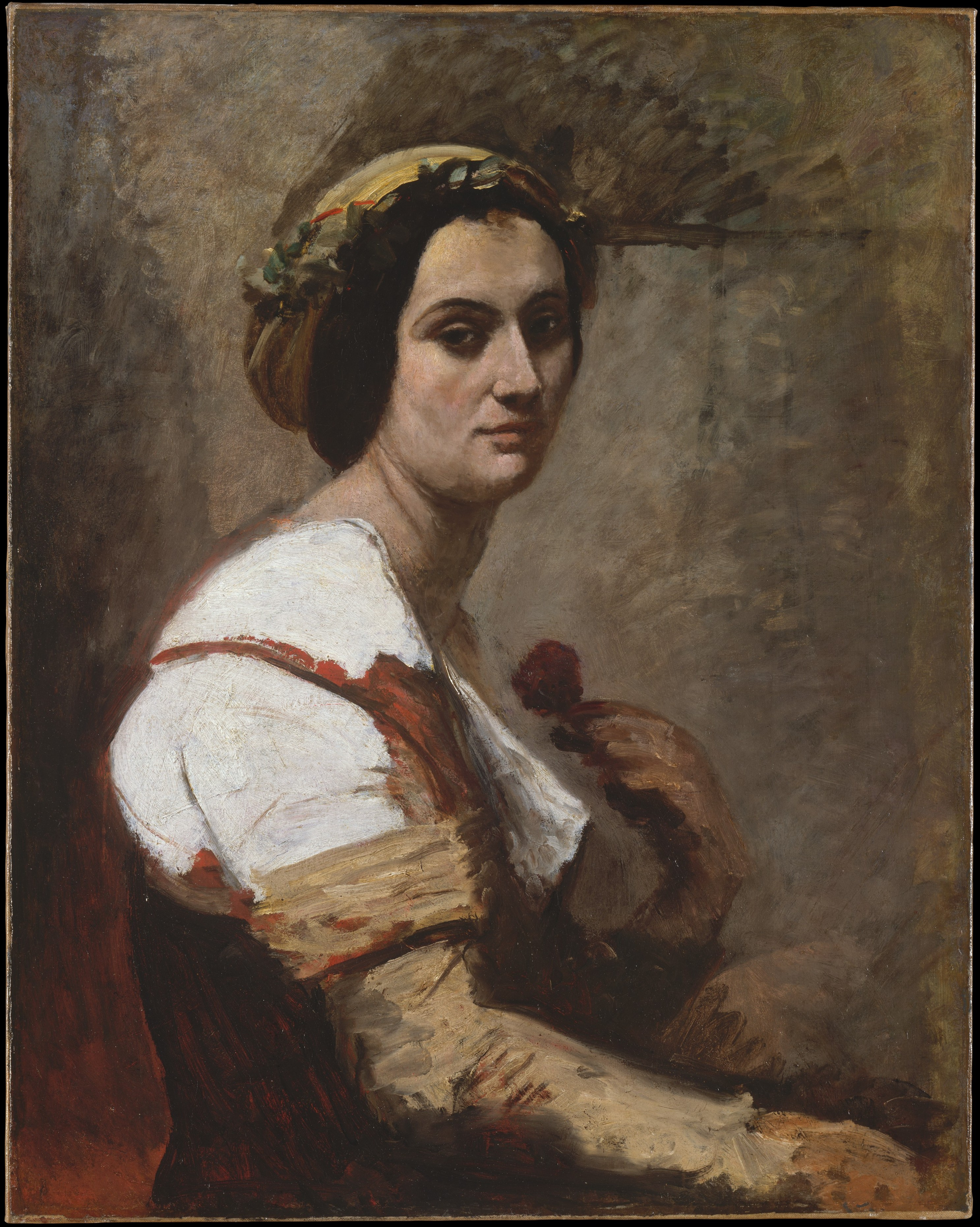
- Artist: Camille Corot
- Year: c. 1870
- Medium: Oil on canvas
- Dimensions: 81.9 cm × 64.8 cm (32.2 in × 25.5 in)
- Location: Metropolitan Museum of Art; New York
- Accession: 29.100.565

Sibylle is an oil-on-canvas painting by the French artist Jean-Baptiste-Camille Corot, from c. 1870. It depicts a model holding a red rose. The painting is in the Metropolitan Museum of Art, in New York.

== Description ==
The painting is better described as a portrait. The work shares stylistic elements with Portrait of Bindo Altoviti, a portrait that was formerly considered to be a self portrait by Raphael, and the Met's description of Sibylle describes the painting as the "height" of Corot's attempts to replicate Raphael's style.

While the title of the painting implies the subject is a Sibyl, others have disputed this.

The painting was donated to the Metropolitan Museum of Art in 1929 as part of the bequest of Louisine Havemeyer.
