= Italian corvette Sibilla =

Sibilla has been borne by at least two ships of the Italian Navy and may refer to:

- Italian corvette Sibilla (1943), a Gabbiano-class corvette launched in 1943.
- Italian corvette Sibilla (F 558), a Minerva-class corvette launched in 1989 and sold in 2015 to Bangladesh for coastguard service. She was renamed CGS Tajuddin.
