= Furio Rendine =

Italian composer, lyricist, producer, organizer and conductor

- Born: 23 March 1920; Naples, Italy
- Died: 22 February 1987 (aged 66); Rome, Italy
- Occupation(s): Musician, composer
- Children: Sergio Rendine

Furio Rendine (23 March 1920 – 22 February 1987) was an Italian composer, lyricist, producer, organizer and conductor.

== Life and career ==
Born in Naples, after getting a degree in law Rendine graduated in piano, harmony and composition at the San Pietro a Majella Conservatory. In the second half of the 1940s he moved to Milan, where he was active as conductor of dance orchestras and started collaborating with EIAR.

Rendine debuted as a composer in 1947, and got his first success in 1948 with the song "A Zingarella". In 1950 he founded the record label Casa Musicale Rendine. Three of his songs won the Festival di Napoli competition: in 1957 "Malinconico Autunno", performed by Marisa Del Frate, in 1958 "Vurria", performed by Nunzio Gallo and Aurelio Fierro, and in 1966 "Bello", performed by Sergio Bruni and Robertino. He himself was artistic director of the 1961 edition of the festival, as well as organizer of numerous musical events.

He was the father of the composer Sergio Rendine.
