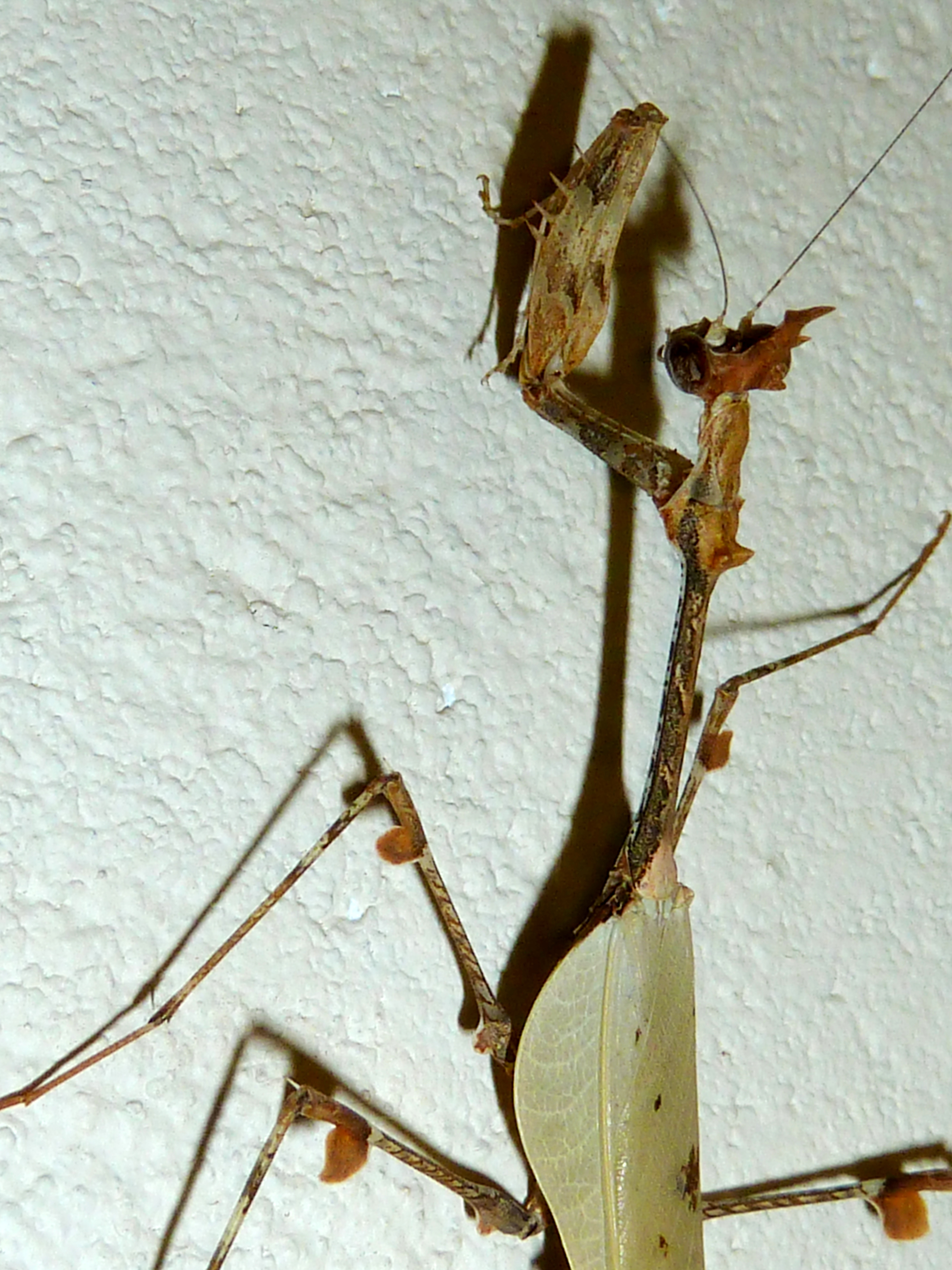

Scientific classification
- Kingdom: Animalia
- Phylum: Arthropoda
- Clade: Pancrustacea
- Class: Insecta
- Order: Mantodea
- Family: Hymenopodidae
- Subfamily: Sibyllinae

Genera
- Leptosibylla; Presibylla; Sibylla

Synonyms
- Sibyllidae

= Sibyllinae =

Subfamily of praying mantises

Sibyllinae is subfamily of mantises in the family Hymenopodidae. It was formerly classified as a separate family, Sibyllidae.

== See also ==
- List of mantis genera and species
