= Queen Sibylla =

Queen Sibylla may refer to:

- Sibylla of Jerusalem (c. 1160–1190), queen regnant of Jerusalem
- Sibylla of Acerra (1153–1205), queen consort of Sicily
- Sibylla of Normandy (1092–1122), queen consort of Scotland
- Sibylla of Lusignan (1198 – c. 1230 or 1252), queen consort of Armenia

== See also ==
- Sibylla (disambiguation)
