= Sibilla (singer) =

Italian singer

- Born: Sibyl Amarilli Mostert; 14 April 1954 (age 72)
- Origin: Zimbabwe
- Genres: Italo disco
- Occupation: Singer
- Years active: 1975–1990

Sibilla, pseudonym of Sibyl Amarilli Mostert (born Zimbabwe, 14 April 1954), is an Italian singer, widely known for the song Oppio, that in the refrain, says Uru belev sameach (עורו אחים בלב שמח), a phrase that means Awake with a cheerful heart, taken from the text of the Hebrew folk song Hava Nagila.

In 1990, she participated in the creation of Paolo Conte's album Parole d'amore scritte a macchina. After this job, we lost sight of her.

== Discography ==
- 1976 - Keoma (Guido and Maurizio De Angelis) she sings Keoma under the name of "Sybil"
- 1982 - Sud Africa (Battiato-Pio) / Alta tensione (Battiato-Pio) inedito
- 1983 - Oppio (Battiato-Pio) / Svegliami (Battiato-Pio)
- 1984 - Plaisir d'amour (Jean-Paul-Égide Martini) / Sex appeal to Europe (Battiato-Pio)
- 1990 - La canoa di mezzanotte (Paolo Conte)

== Filmography ==
- 1979 - Orchestra Rehearsal directed by Federico Fellini

== Bibliography ==
- AA.VV. Dizionario della canzone italiana, Armando Curcio Editore, 1990; at the page Sibilla
- Eddy Anselmi, Festival di Sanremo. Almanacco illustrato della canzone italiana, Panini Group, Modena, 2009; pagg. 335 and 900
