= Sergio Rendine =

Italian composer (1954–2023)

- Born: 7 September 1954; Naples, Italy
- Died: 21 April 2023 (aged 68); Pescara, Italy
- Occupations: Composer; Academic teacher
- Father: Furio Rendine
- Awards: Prix Italia; Premios Ondas

Sergio Rendine (7 September 1954 – 21 April 2023) was an Italian composer of operas, ballets, symphonies, cantatas and chamber music. He worked as a lecturer at the Conservatorio Alfredo Casella, for the Accademia Nazionale di Santa Cecilia, and for SIAE. He was artistic director of the Teatro Marrucino in Chieti from 1997 to 2007. He received awards for Alice, a "radiophonic opera". His opera Un segreto d'importanza was premiered by the Opéra de Monte-Carlo. His Missa de beatificatione in onore di Padre Pio da Pietrelcina, a mass written for the beatification of Pio of Pietrelcina, was premiered in 1999 in Vatican City, with José Carreras as a soloist. His oratorio Passio et Ressurrectio was recorded live and broadcast from the cathedral in Chieti premiere, and his two symphonies were recorded by Chandos Records.

== Life and career ==
Rendine was born in Naples on 7 September 1954, the son of composer Furio Rendine, and the grandson of Salvatore Papaccio. He studied with Domenico Guaccero at the Santa Cecilia Conservatory in Rome and with Giuseppe Agostini at Pesaro Conservatory, where he graduated in choral music and choral conducting. He taught at the Conservatorio Alfredo Casella in L'Aquila. Rendine was on the board of directors of the Accademia Nazionale di Santa Cecilia, was artistic director of the Eclat festival of contemporary music in Stuttgart from 1988 to 1991, commissioner for the opera section of the SIAE from 1995 to 2000, artistic director of the Teatro Marrucino in Chieti from 1997 to 2007.

His works were commissioned by BBC London, SWR Symphonieorchester, Norddeutscher Rundfunk, Kölner Philharmonie, Opéra de Monte-Carlo, Teatro dell'Opera di Roma, Teatro di San Carlo in Naples, Teatro Comunale in Bologna, Arena di Verona, La Scala in Milan, Orchestra Sinfonica Nazionale della RAI, Salzburg Festival, Strasbourg Music Festival, and the Schwetzingen Festival, among others.

Together with Yoritsune Matsudaira, Gian Carlo Menotti, Krzysztof Penderecki and Alfred Schnittke, Rendine was commissioned by the Nobel Peace Prize Committee to compose the Mass for Peace, which was performed at the Nobel Peace Prize Concert in Oslo on 11 December 1995.

Rendine was awarded both the Prix Italia and the Premios Ondas for the "radiophonic opera" Alice in 1987–1988.

Rendine died in Pescara on 21 April 2023, at age 68.

== Compositions ==
Rendine's music was influenced by the sacred music of Johann Sebastian Bach, the theatre music of Naples, traditional passion music sung in the streets, and by ritual dances. Rendine's compositions were published by Casa Ricordi, Casa Sonzogno, B & W Italia (Bideri & Warner Music), and Edipan. His works include:

- Alice, "radiophonic opera" in 126 episodes based on Alice in Wonderland, 1986–1987, commissioned by RAI Radio 1 and RAI Radio 3
- Hermes 594" for large orchestra, premiered 1987 London BBC Symphony Orchestra conducted by Gianluigi Gelmetti
- Alice, ballet to music from the opera, premiered in Rome's Teatro Olimpico in 1988, with Lindsay Kemp as choreographer and dancer
- Un segreto d'importanza, ovvero La faticosa vecchiaia di Wolfgang Amadeus Mozart, opera buffa in one act to a libretto by Lorenzo Arruga, premiered on 6 March 1992, Opéra de Monte-Carlo
- "Alleluia" for Messa per la Pace, Nobel Peace Prize Concert 1995 in, Oslo 1995, conducted by Vladimir Ashkenazy, with Milva as the vocal soloist
- Orlando (ballet), 1997, premiered at the Opera di Roma, conducted by Vittorio Parisi and choreographed by Robert North, with Carla Fracci in the title role
- Missa de beatificatione in onore di Padre Pio da Pietrelcina, Mass for, the beatification of Pio of Pietrelcina, premiered 2 May 1999, Vatican City, Sala Nervi, with José Carreras
- Passio et Resurrectio, for solo voices, chorus and orchestra, premiered 13 April 2000, Cattedrale di San Giustino, Chieti, in a concert recorded and broadcast
- Romanza, una favola romana, opera in three acts to a libretto by Egale Cerroni, premiered 21 November 2002, Opera di Roma, conducted by Will Humburg, with Amii Stewart as Maria and Vittorio Grigolo as Aniel
- Canto della notte, for women's choir and wind instruments, commissioned by the Foundation of the Arena di Verona
- Symphony No. 1, for the Orchestra Sinfonica di Sanremo (2006)
- Symphony No. 2 "Andorrana", commissioned by the government of Andorra, premiered 2007, Auditorio Nacional de Música, Madrid
- Cadens revixit – Vita nuova di Paolo di Tarso, oratorio to a libretto by Roberto Mussapi, premiered 2009 at San Paolo fuori le Mura in Rome

=== Recordings ===
Rendine's Passio and Ressurrectio was recorded live when it was premiered on 13 April 2000, then Good Friday, at the Cattedrale di San Giustino in Chieti, by Naxos, released in 2003. His two symphonies were recorded by Chandos Records in 2007, played by the Orquestra Nacional Clàssica d'Andorra conducted by Marzio Conti.
