= Marzio Conti =

Italian conductor and musician

- Born: 22 May 1960; Florence, Italy
- Occupations: conductor; flautist

Marzio Conti (born 22 May 1960) is an Italian conductor and flautist.

== Biography ==
Conti was born in Florence. He began his career as a flautist making his debut at the Salzburg Festival at the age of twenty with I Solisti Veneti. After study with the Italian conductor Piero Bellugi, Conti gave up his career as a flautist to concentrate on conducting. He was the principal conductor of the Turin Philharmonic Orchestra from 2001 to 2005. He went on to become the Principal conductor of the Teatro Marrucino in Chieti and the National Chamber Orchestra of Andorra. From 2011 to 2017 he was the Principal conductor of the Oviedo Filarmonia in Spain. He received the Gold Medal of the Auditorio Príncipe Felipe de Oviedo. He has also served several times on Jury of the Arts in the Princess of Asturias Awards.

From 1998 to 2002 he was principal conductor at the Istituzione Sinfonica Abruzzese in Italy, responsible for a major period of artistic growth and international prestige that led to a series of recordings and frequent tours in Italy, France, and Spain.

From 2001 until 2004, Conti was music director of the Philharmonic Orchestra of Turin. He infused the programming with new life and helped bring about a growth in subscriptions, and began a series of initiatives that brought the orchestra more in touch with civic life in Turin. His recordings with the orchestra drew praise from critics, and he and the orchestra toured France, Germany and Spain. He forged a partnership with the French city of Lyon which lead the orchestra in a historic Requiem Dvorak National Auditorium of the same city. Under his leadership, the orchestra became known throughout Europe with frequent tours in Italy, France, Germany and Spain.

From 2003 until 2008, Conti was Music Director of the Teatro di Tradizione per l’Opera Italiana of Chieti. He brought a series of recordings in collaboration with Naxos focused on Italian opera: Rossini’s Il Turco in Italia, Donizetti’s La Figlia del Reggimento etc. Chieti's theater participated in numerous television programs in the most important opera broadcasts nationwide and created a network of partnerships with other Italian theaters, including those of Pisa, Lucca, Livorno, Jesi,

and Ravenna, that led to lower costs for the various opera productions. Notable amongst these programs was"The Concert for Peace" from King David Auditorium Tel Aviv (Israel).

From 2004 to 2010 Conti also served as Artistic Director of the Orchestra Sinfonica di Sanremo, taking over the orchestra at a time of economic crisis and image problems. He raised funds, established connections with other institutions, and attracted a new, younger audience which raised the orchestra’s profile and quality enough to bring it to the Auditorium Parco della Musica in Rome, securing a recording contract with Naxos and residency at the Nice Summer Festival, home of the prestigious international summer academy, where he had previously held the chair of flute studies after Jean-Pierre Rampal and Alain Marion. Another notable achievement in Sanremo was his creation of the musical West Side Story made exclusively with high school youth who had never before made music. Prepared during the school year, the work was a great success with audiences and critics alike and was instrumental in adding new subscribers to the orchestra.

Since 2014, he has collaborated as guest conductor and professor with Jacobs School of Music, Indiana University and since 2017 he is guest principal conductor of the AIMS Festival in Graz.

== Recordings ==
Conti has recorded Warner International, Naxos Records, Chandos Records, Real Sound Records, Classic Produktion Osnabrück and Brilliant Records.

Naxos include:

- Rossini: Il turco in Italia
- Rendine:Passio et Resurrectio
- Rendine: Symphonies 1 & 2
- Donizetti: La fille du régiment
- Cimarosa: Il matrimonio segreto

Chandos include:

- Nino Rota "Suite dal balletto "La strada", Sinfonia sopra una canzone d'amore, Ballabili dal Gattopardo
- Nino Rota Sinfonie
- Nino Rota Concerti

CPO recordings include:

- Respighi "La pentola magica", "La sensitiva","Aretusa"
- Respighi "La boutique fantasque" – Uccelli
- G.F. Malipiero integrale

Brilliant recordings include:

- Casella "Concerti"

RS recordings include:

- W. A. Mozart Sinfonie n.1 – 4 – 5 – 41
- Debussy, Saint-Saëns, Ravel, Faurè

Warner Classic recordings include:

- Camille Saint-Saëns - Symphony n.3, Violin Concert n.3
