= Bang Hai Ja =

South Korean artist (1937–2022)

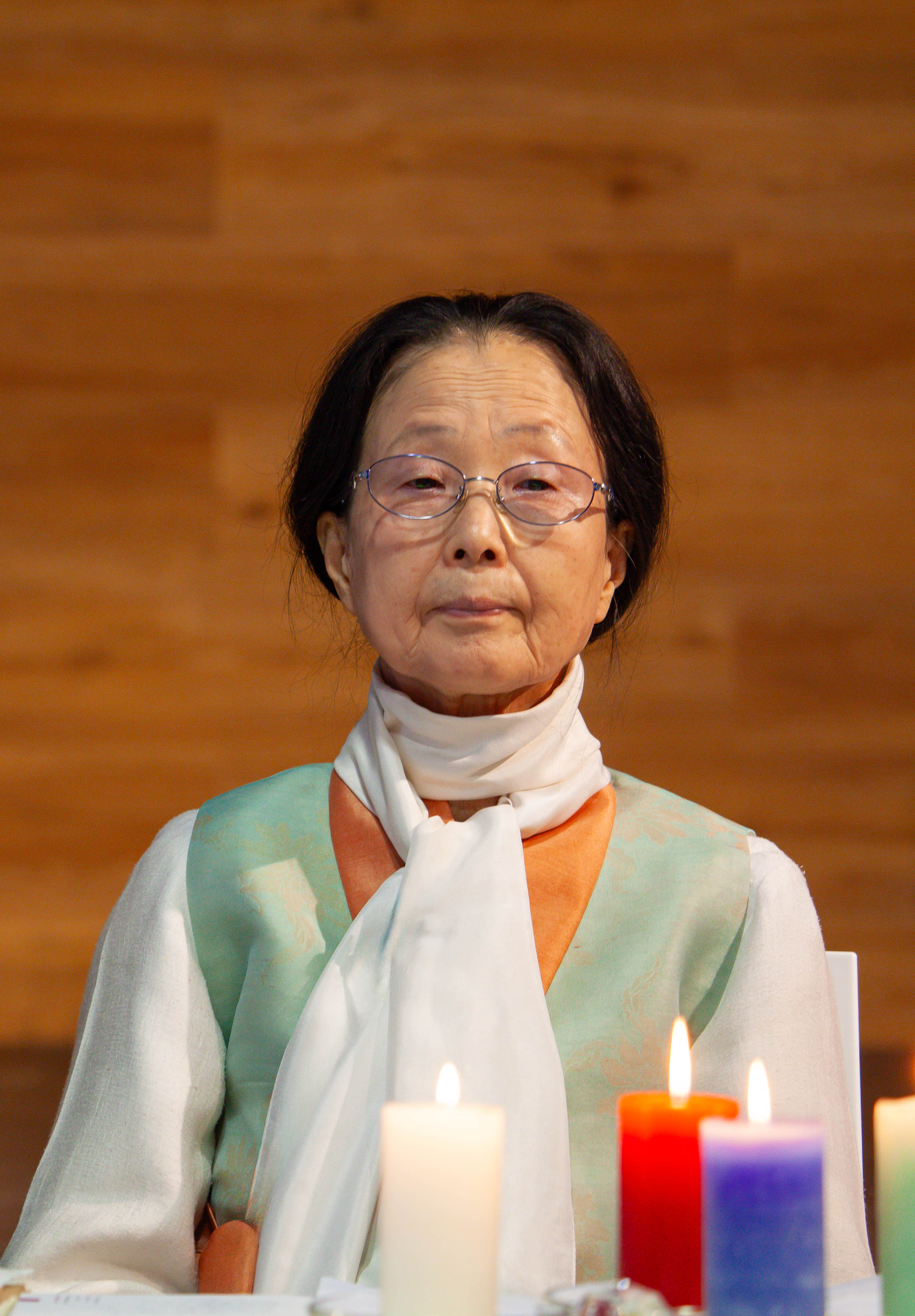
- Bang Hai Ja in Budapest in 2014
- Born: July 5, 1937; Seoul
- Died: September 15, 2022; Aubenas (France)
- Education: Fine arts at Seoul National University
- Known for: Abstract painting, stained-glass, calligraphy

Korean name
- Hangul: 방혜자
- RR: Bang Hyeja
- MR: Pang Hyeja
- Website: banghaija.com

Bang Hai Ja (Korean: 방혜자; 5 July 1937 – 15 September 2022) was a South Korean-born abstract painter, stained-glass artist and calligrapher, who from 1961 was based in Paris. Light was a central theme in her work, representing joy, peace and love in her aim to unite East and West. In 2018, she was invited by the French authorities to create four windows for Chartres Cathedral.

== Biography ==
Born on 5 July 1937 in Seoul, Bang Hai Ja graduated in fine arts from Seoul National University in 1961 where she studied Eastern and Western Art as well as calligraphy. While at the university, she suffered from the traditional approach of the faculty but was encouraged in particular by Chang Ucchin. As a result, she progressed towards abstraction, producing her first non-figurative work in 1960. Attracted by French language and culture, especially the existentialism movement, she moved to Paris in 1961.

There she discovered an interest in Korean art as there had already been an exhibition in 1960 and Lee Ungno had just participated in an exhibition bringing together foreign artists based in Paris. Bang Hai Ja's acceptance was further facilitated by an exhibition of Asian art in 1969 and in particular by the support she received for Pierre Courthion soon after her arrival. This led to contacts with Elvire Jan, Léon Zack and Zao Wou-Ki.

As abstract art began to lose appeal in both France and Korea in the late 1960s, when Bang Hai Ja returned to her native country in 1968 she became more interested in the qualities of materials, especially paper or hanji. She then embarked on a period during which she made wide use of natural materials, concentrating on the theme of light as a basis for providing inspiration of the soul, leading East and West to strive for peace.

In 2018, she was invited by the French authorities to design four stained-glass windows for Chartres Cathedral. An exhibition of her work was held in Paris at the Musée Cernuschi in early 2019.

Bang Hai Ja died in Ardèche on 15 September 2022, at the age of 85.

== Artist of Light ==
Bang Hai Ja is known as “the artist of light.” The reason is very direct. She had depicted light as her main subject in every art piece she created throughout her entire life for about more than sixty years. Also, most of her artworks’ titles include light explicitly. Her interest in light as a subject started in her childhood. She spoke in one of her interviews that as a sick child, she was not able to run around and play as her peers did. Instead, she often spent time thinking and observing. She further explains that she was captivated by the sunlight that was reflected on the little stream on the side of her grandparents' house, and started to wonder if she would be able to capture this beautiful and mesmerizing light with her brushes and paints. However, this visual aspect of light was not the only thing that made her depict light in her paintings for her entire life. Bang Hai Ja has a solid philosophy about light, which is very explicitly stated in all of her interviews and autobiographies. The fundamental philosophy that underlies in all her works is that light was the first thing that marked the beginning of the entire universe, the cosmos. Therefore, she believes that light is the origin of everything, and all eventually return to the light. She not only states her philosophy of light, but actually embraces and visually, and physically manifests this philosophy with her choice of materials and the process of art making.

== Art Making Process ==
With this claim that everything in nature is connected to us and her, she only uses natural materials which is an unusual approach for a contemporary artist who is likely to be familiar with the use of acrylics and canvas with her background of studying art in France. However, she uses only natural materials such as natural pigments, and a traditional Korean paper called “Hanji” which is also made out of natural vegetation. Also, she makes this hanji herself instead of buying the paper. When she makes her art, she begins by crumpling the paper in the middle which acts as a singular point to start with when applying the hue. The process that follows is the layering of hues and colors that does not erase the trace of initial coloring but rather gently adds upon the previous step made shown in figure 1. She often colors the underside of the paper to create more sense of depth, which again emphasizes the process of building up on the previous layering. The first crumpling of the paper in the middle is the physical point where the art piece begins, and therefore reflects the idea of singularity, the light being the origin of everything. The outcome of this process also visually reflects the nature of everything starting from the first singular point with different layers of color radiating outwards.

== Installation works ==
Her focus on light can be read in multiple ways. For the Christian and Catholic audience, light can be read as the nature of God since it is used as a symbol of goodness, holiness, and spiritual pureness in the Bible. Also, some of her initial works were installed on the wall of one of the cathedrals located on Jeju Island in South Korea in 1969, and also she held a solo exhibition in Chapelle Saint-Louis de la Sale triere in 2003. On the other hand, Bang Hai Ja’s philosophy of light can be read in a Buddhist context, since one of the fundamental underlying values and philosophy of Buddhism is the interconnectedness and non-duality, the idea that everything is connected. With the fundamental philosophy of her art piece aligning exactly with Buddhist ideals, it is not a surprise that a lot of her installation works with active interaction and conversation with space took place in temples. She placed her installation works in Gilsang Temple in 1994, Seoul Bogack Temple in 1998, and many others. In her autobiography, she wrote "I believe that both religions, Catholic and Buddhism, are, in combination, a one way towards love. I intend to truly learn Jesus’s love and Buddha’s mercy within my heart put those together, and open up my heart towards this one path." She also added that our hearts and mind should return to their origin (light) and be born into a new light and a new life by the practice of silence. Therefore, her works cannot be interpreted with a single view of one specific religion. Those are rather an outcome of the complex layering of religions that are intertwined in the artist’s perspective in a way that both bring one’s heart to love.
