= I due timidi =

1950 opera by Nino Rota

- by Nino Rota
- Translation: The Two Timid Ones
- Librettist: Suso Cecchi d'Amico
- Premiere: 15 November 1950; Radio Audizioni Italiane

I due timidi (in English, The Two Timid Ones) is a one-act radio opera (also described as a commedia lirica) composed in 1950 by Nino Rota with libretto by the film writer Suso Cecchi d'Amico.

== Performance history ==
It was originally written as a radio production for Radio Audizioni Italiane and first performed, on air, on 15 November 1950. The first staged production was in London at the Scala Theatre (London Opera Club) on 17 March 1952. It was also given at the Teatro Petruzzelli in Bari on 18 January 1971, and at the Teatro Donizetti in Bergamo on 23 October 1972.

It was revived by the Wiener Kammeroper opera company in Vienna in 2007. and again by the Santa Fe Opera as part of their "One-Hour Opera" program in the spring of 2008.

== Roles ==
Role	Voice type	Premiere Cast, 15 November 1950 (Conductor: Franco Ferrara )
Mariuccia	soprano	Emma Tegani
Lucia	soprano	Graziella Sciutti
Maria	soprano	Mirella Ronconi
Signora Guidotti	mezzo-soprano	Agnese Dubbini
Lisa	mezzo-soprano	Scilly Fortunato
Raimondo	tenor	Amedeo Berdini
Dr Sinisgalli	tenor	Mario Carlin
Vittorio	baritone	Lorenzo Catacchio
Narrator	Bass	Franco Calabrese
Mariuccia's mother	mezzo-soprano	

== Recordings ==
- Rota: I due timidi, La notte di un nevrastenico, Orchestra Filarmonia Veneta 'G F Malipiero', Chorus of the Teatro Sociale di Rovigo. Conductor: Flavio Emilio Scogna. Principal singers: Paolo Drigo, Shin Young-Hoon, Sabrina Testa, Lorenzo Battagion, Nunzio Galli, Giuliano Scaranello. Release date: 2005. Label: Bongiovanni 2367 (CD)
- I due timidi / La notte di un nevrastenico, Giorgio Celenza, Sabrina Cortese, Daniele Adriani, Antonio Sapio, Chiara Osella, and Carlo Feola Reate Festival Orchestra, led by Gabriele Bonolis, Dynamic 2CD or DVD, 2019
