= Women's Department =

Women's Department may refer to:

- Department of Women Affairs, a department of the Bangladeshi government
- Department of Women, Youth and Persons with Disabilities, a department of the South African government
- King's College London Women's Department, the former name for Queen Elizabeth College
- Office for Women, a department of the Australian government
- Zhenotdel, the women's department of the All-Russian Communist Party (Bolsheviks)
- The women's clothing section in a department store

== See also ==
- Ministry of Women (disambiguation)
- Feminism
