= Sibyl Vane (band) =

French indie rock band

- Origin: France
- Genres: Indie rock, art rock, Baroque pop, Alternative rock
- Years active: 2002–present
- Labels: Jerkov, A Tant Rêver Du Roi
- Members: Bernard Cabarrou; Stéphane Sapanel; Arnaud Millan; Grégory Foix
- Past members: Eddy Crampes; Pierre Dutrey; Mathilde Maitre; Luc Cabassot

Sibyl Vane is an indie rock band from Pau, France created in 2002 by Bernard Cabarrou, Stéphane Sapanel, Eddy Crampes, and Pierre Dutrey.

== History ==
The French band Sibyl Vane is based in Pau since 2003. They take their name from a character in Oscar Wilde's novel The Picture of Dorian Gray. They tend to incorporate performance art into their stage shows.

Their first recording attempt, Pret-a-porter, was released in late 2002 as a demo CD-R, a few months before its official release as an EP. In October 2005, the band released its debut album, Paradoxes, on the Jerkov label. In 2006 the band recorded a cover version of David Bowie's "I'm Deranged" for the Chicago-based label FTC Records. The compilation entitled 2. Contamination includes bands such as Arcade Fire, The Dresden Dolls, and David J.

Sibyl Vane's next album, The Locked Suitcase, was released in October 2008. This album was recorded in France and mixed at the Hotel2Tango, Montréal by Howard Bilerman (Arcade Fire, A Silver Mt. Zion). Artists such as Mike Garson and Lydia Lunch have collaborated with the band and appear on the album.

Sibyl Vane has played with artists such as Dominique A, Ulan Bator, L'Enfance Rouge, Tahiti 80, and Calc.

== Discography ==
=== Albums ===
- The Locked Suitcase (A Tant Rêver Du Roi) (March 2008)
- Paradoxes (Jerkov) (October 2005)

=== Singles and EPs ===
- Prêt-à-porter (EP) (self-released demo) (2002) (Re-released through A Tant Rêver Du Roi in 2003)

=== Compilation appearances ===
- 2. Contamination (FTC Records) (2005) (2-CD tribute to David Bowie)

== English translation of references ==
- 1.Sybil Vane - The Locked Suitcase liability webzine (Google translation)
- 2.A decouvirir absolument (Google translate)
- 3.Musique en Biggore -Sybil Vane (Google translation)
- 4.The Locked Suitcase review by Starsareunderground (Google translation)
- 5.Sybil Vane Paradoxes - Foutraque.com (Google translation)
- 6.Paradoxes review by Benzinemag (Google translation)
- 7.Review of The Locked Suitcase by Magic Box (Google translation)
