= La notte di un nevrastenico =

La notte di un nevrastenico is a 1959 one-act opera by Nino Rota for Milan, to a libretto by Riccardo Bacchelli.

It was recorded in 2017 by the Reate Festival Orchestra, conducted by Gabriele Bonolis.
