= Sibylle (disambiguation) =

Sibylle is a given name.

Sibylle may also refer to:

- Sibylle-class frigate, a class of five 32-gun sail frigates designed by Jacques-Noël Sané and built for the French Navy in the late 1770s
- French ship Sibylle, a number of French ships
- Sibylle (magazine), fashion magazine published in East Germany
- Sibylle (painting), a c. 1870 painting by Jean-Baptiste-Camille Corot
- Sibylle, the French word for sibyl, a prophetess or oracle in Ancient Greece
