= 29th Locarno Film Festival =

Film festival in Locarno, Switzerland

- Location: Locarno, Switzerland
- Founded: 1946
- Awards: Golden Leopard: The Big Night directed by Francis Reusser
- Artistic director: Moritz de Hadeln
- Festival date: Opening: 5 August 1976; Closing: 15 August 1976
- Website: Locarno Film Festival

Locarno Film Festival
- 30th 28th

The 29th Locarno Film Festival was held from 5 to 15 August 1976 in Locarno, Switzerland. The Locarno open-air screenings were moved inside for five nights due to rain, at the cost of $2,000 each night in lost revenue for the festival. The festival attracted controversial by screening the erotic film In the Realm of the Senses and the then recently deceased Pier Paolo Pasolini's Salò, or the 120 Days of Sodom.

Moritz de Hadeln, the festival's artistic director, also took an unusual step of paying for the American film Jackson County Jail, produced by Roger Corman, to be subtitled for Switzerland, with the belief that upon local sale the investment would pay off. Famed director Douglas Sirk, a juror at the last festival and area local, also attended the festival.

The Golden Leopard, the festival's top prize, was awarded to The Big Night directed by Francis Reusser.

== Jury ==
- Margarethe Von Trotta, Jury President, German actress.
- Sven Nyvkist, Swedish cinematographer
- Michel Lonsdale, French thespian
- Rolf Lyssy, Swiss director
- Georguy Stoyanov, Bulgarian director

== Official Sections ==
The following films were screened in these sections:

=== Main Program ===
Main Program / Feature Films In Competition

Original Title	English Title	Director(s)	Year	Production Country
Angst		Oddvar Bull Tuhus	1976	Norway
Chin Chin El Teropocho	Chin Chin El Teporocho	Gabriel Retes	1976	Mexico
Der Gehülfe	The Assistant	Thomas Koerfer		Switzerland
Happy Day		Pantelis Voulgaris	1976	Greece
Il N'Y A Pas D'Oubli	There is No Forgetfulness	Rodrigo Gonzales, Marilu Mallet	1975	Canada
Jackson County Jail		Michael Miller	1976	USA
Juliette Et L'Air Du Temps	Juliette and the Spirit of the Times	Renée Gibson	1976	France
L'Affiche Rouge	The Red Poster	Frank Cassenti	1976	France
Le Grand Soir	The Big Night	Francis Reusser	1976	Switzerland
Les Ambassadeurs	The Ambassadors	Naceur Ktai	1976	Tunisia
Marcia Trionfale	Victory March	Marco Bellocchio	1976	Italy
Mirt Sost Shi Amit	Harvest: 3,000 Years	Haile Gerima	1975	Ethiopia
Pleasantville		Kenneth Locker, Vicki Polon	1976	USA
Ragazzo Di Borgata	Borgata Boy	Giulio Paradisi	1976	Italy
Sebastiane		Paul Humfree, Derek Jarman	1976	Great Britain
Stay Hungry		Bob Rafelson	1976	USA
Vera Romeyke Ist Nicht Tragbar	Vera Romeyke is not Sustainable	Max Willutzki	1976	Germany
Vörös Requiem	Red Requiem	Ferenc Grunwalsky	1976	Hungary

=== Out of Competition ===
Main Program / Feature Films Out of Competition

Original Title	English Title	Director(s)	Year	Production Country
Афоня	Afonya	Guerguy Danélia	1975	Russia
Der Fangschuss	Coup de Grâce	Volker Schlöndorff	1976	Germany
Jonas Qui Aura 25 Ans En L'An 2000	Jonah Who Will Be 25 in the Year 2000	Alain Tanner	1976	Switzerland
M Der Mörder	M	Fritz Lang	1931	Germany
Salò O Le Centoventi Giornate Di Sodoma	Salò, or the 120 Days of Sodom.	Pier Paolo Pasolini	1976	Italy

=== Film Critics Week ===
FIPRESCI – International Federation of Film Critics Week
Original Title	English Title	Director(s)	Year	Production Country
Awans	Promotion	Janusz Zaorski		Poland
Der Stumme	The Silent	Gaudenz Meili		Switzerland
Es Herrscht Ruhe Im Land	There is Peace in the Country	Peter Lilienthal		Germany
Jesus Von Ottakring	Jesus of Ottakring	Wilhelm Pellert		Austria
Labirintus	Labyrinth	Andras Kovacs		Hungary
Lasse & Geir	Lasse & Geir	Svend Wam		Norway
Matches Du Dimanche	Sunday Matches	Todor Andreikov		Bulgaria

=== Special Sections ===
==== Open Forum ====
Open Forum
Original title	English title	Director(s)	Year	Production country
Der Starke Ferdinand	Strongman Ferdinand	Alexander Kluge	1976	Germany
Flocons D'Or		Werner Schroeter		France, Germany
Giliap		Roy Andersson		Sudan
Grey Gardens		Albert Maysles, David Maysles	1975	USA
L'Empire Des Sens	In the Realm of the Senses	Nagisa Oshima		France, Japan
Mamma Roma		Pier Paolo Pasolini	1962	Italy
Ossessione		Luchino Visconti	1943	Italy
Reifezeit	Ripening	Sohrab Shahid-Saless		Germany
Rogopag, Episodio La Ricotta	Rogopag, Episode La Ricotta	Pier Paolo Pasolini	1963	Italy
Shirins Hochzeit	Shirin's Wedding	Helma Sanders		Germany
Son Nom De Venise Dans Calcutta Desert	His Name of Venice in Calcutta Desert	Marguerite Duras		France

==== Swiss Information ====
Swiss Information
Original title	English title	Director(s)	Year	Production country
Die Erschiessung Des Landesverräters Ernst S.	The Shooting of the Traitor Ernst S.	Richard Dindo		Switzerland
E Noialtri Apprendisti	And Legal Apprentices	Giovanni Doffini		Switzerland
Schatten Der Engel	Shadow of the Angel	Daniel Schmid		Switzerland
The Bus		Bay Okan		Switzerland

==== Tribute To Pietro Germi ====
Tribute To Pietro Germi (1914–1974)
Original title	English title	Director(s)	Year	Production country
Divorzio All'Italyna	Divorce Italyn Style	Pietro Germi	1961	Italy
Gelosia	Jealousy	Pietro Germi	1953	Italy
Il Brigante Di Tacca Del Lupo	The Bandit of Tacca Del Lupo	Pietro Germi	1951	Italy
Il Cammino Della Speranza	Path of Hope	Pietro Germi	1951	Italy
Il Ferroviere	The Railroad Man	Pietro Germi	1956	Italy
In Nome Della Legge	In the Name of the Law	Pietro Germi	1949	Italy
L'Uomo Di Paglia	A Man of Straw	Pietro Germi	1958	Italy
La Presidentessa	Mademoiselle Gobete	Pietro Germi	1952	Italy
Sedotta E Abbandonata	Seduced and Abandoned	Pietro Germi	1964	Italy
Un Maledetto Imbroglio	The Facts of Murder	Pietro Germi	1959	Italy

== Official Awards ==
=== International Jury ===
- Golden Leopard: THE BIG NIGHT by Francis Reusser
- Silver Leopard: Harvest: 3,000 Years by Haile Gerima
- Ernest Artaria Prize: Renato Berta in JONAS QUI AURA 25 ANS EN L'AN 2000 by Alain Tanner, DER GEHÜLFE by Thomas Koerfer,LE GRAND SOIR by Francis Reusser
- International Jury Prize: Marco Bellocchio
- International Jury Mention: IL N'Y A PAS D'OUBLI by Rodrigo Gonzales and Marilu Mallet,SILNA VODA by Ivan Terziev

=== FIPRESCI Jury ===
- International Critics Award: JONAS QUI AURA 25 ANS EN L'AN 2000 by Alain Tanner,SHIRINS HOCHZEIT by Helma Sanders
- International Critics special Award: SALÒ O LE CENTOVENTI GIORNATE DI SODOMA by Pier Paolo Pasolini

=== Oecumenical Jury ===
- Oecumenical Jury Prize: Harvest: 3,000 Years directed by Haile Gerima
- Oecumenical Jury Mention: JESUS VON OTTAKRING by Wilhelm Pellert,REIFEZEIT by Sohrab Sahid-Saless,LES AMBASSADEURS by Naceur Ktai
