= Aiace Parolin =

Italian film cinematographer (1920-2016)

- Born: 28 March 1920; Cagliari, Italy
- Died: 19 November 2016 (aged 96); Rome, Italy
- Occupation: Cinematographer

Aiace Parolin (28 March 1920 – 19 November 2016) was an Italian film cinematographer.

== Life and career ==
Born in Cagliari, at young age Parolin moved to Rome where he studied mechanical drawing at the Technical Institute. In 1935, he was hired as a camera maintenance engineer by film company Cines. He first worked on set in 1947, as second assistant cameraman in the Giuseppe De Santis' drama film Tragic Hunt.

In 1953, Parolin debuted as a cameraman under Leonida Barboni, and in 1961 he made his debut as a cinematographer on Alfredo Giannetti's Day by Day, Desperately. He is best known for his long professional relationship with Pietro Germi, with whom he collaborated from 1964 until Germi's death. He died on 19 November 2016, aged 96.

== Selected filmography ==
- Seduced and Abandoned (1964)
- Beautiful Families (1964)
- The Moment of Truth (1965)
- The Birds, the Bees and the Italians (1966)
- Shoot Loud, Louder... I Don't Understand (1966)
- The Climax (1967)
- A Minute to Pray, a Second to Die (1968)
- Serafino (1968)
- Black Jesus (1968)
- Giacomo Casanova: Childhood and Adolescence (1969)
- Love and Anger (1969)
- A Pocketful of Chestnuts (1970)
- Basta guardarla (1970)
- They Have Changed Their Face (1971)
- The Sicilian Connection (1972)
- Alfredo, Alfredo (1972)
- Baba Yaga (1973)
- Long Lasting Days (1973)
- Simona (1974)
- Order to Kill (1975)
- Street People (1976)
- Keoma (1976)
- Il marito in collegio (1977)
- I'm for the Hippopotamus (1979)
