= Serafino (film) =

- Directed by: Pietro Germi
- Written by: Leonardo Benvenuti; Piero De Bernardi; Pietro Germi; Alfredo Giannetti; Tullio Pinelli
- Produced by: Pietro Germi; Angelo Rizzoli
- Starring: Adriano Celentano
- Cinematography: Aiace Parolin
- Edited by: Sergio Montanari
- Music by: Carlo Rustichelli
- Production companies: Francoriz Production; RPA Rizzoli Film
- Release date: 17 December 1968
- Running time: 96 minutes
- Country: Italy
- Language: Italian

Serafino (also known as Serafino ou L'amour aux champs in France) is a 1968 Italian film directed by Pietro Germi.

== Plot ==
Serafino is a nature-boy who never attended school. He relishes the simple life as a shepherd in the mountains of Italy in Arquata del Tronto, Marche. When he is conscripted as a soldier and has to undertake compulsory military service in a big city, he creates various troubles and eventually the military dismisses him early.

When he returns home he discovers that his cousin Lidia has become an attractive woman. He neglects his old friend Asmara, the local hooker, and starts a secret love affair with Lidia. But when their old aunt Gesuina dies, Lidia acts as greedy as her whole family and Serafino openly resents that. To everybody's surprise Gesuina has chosen Serafino as her heir. Serafino doesn't hesitate to squander the money with his friends, buying them gifts and a brand new convertible for himself. When the car gets stuck in a pothole, Serafino and his friends try to push it out, ending up with the driverless car barreling down into a ravine and its complete destruction. This careless misshap is unbearable for Serafino's uncle (and Lidia's father) Agenore, who therefore petitions to have Serafino declared mentally incompetent.

In court Serafino tries to defend himself. He doesn't take the matter seriously and gloats about the fact that even the military couldn't deal with him either. In the end the judge decides against his mental capacity. Even so, Agenore cannot get hold of Serafino's money. When he learns that Serafino can still marry and that in this case, his wife would be his legal guardian and manager of the inherited estate, he tries to force Serafino into marrying his daughter Lidia. But again Serafino pretends to be too dumb to comply, and once again he is successful in avoiding Agenore's machinations. In the end Serafino marries Asmara, and he returns to his work as a shepherd.

== Cast ==
- Adriano Celentano: Serafino
- Saro Urzì: Uncle Agenore
- Francesca Romana Coluzzi: Asmara
- Ottavia Piccolo: Lidia
- Amedeo Trilli: Pasquale
- Nerina Montagnani: Aunt Gesuina
- Benjamin Lev: Armido
- Nazzareno Natale: Silio

== Awards ==
- Golden Prize at the 6th Moscow International Film Festival in 1969.
