= La presidentessa =

La presidentessa may refer to:

- La presidentessa (1952 film)
- La presidentessa (1977 film)
