= Day by Day, Desperately =

- Directed by: Alfredo Giannetti
- Produced by: Franco Cristaldi
- Cinematography: Aiace Parolin
- Edited by: Ruggero Mastroianni
- Music by: Carlo Rustichelli
- Release date: 1961
- Language: Italian

Day by Day, Desperately (Italian: Giorno per giorno disperatamente) is a 1961 Italian drama film written and directed by Alfredo Giannetti. According to the film critic Morando Morandini, the film is "a naturalistic drama of strong emotional charge, crossed by a vein of desperate lyricism."

== Plot ==
The mental illness affecting young Dario, one of the two sons of the Dominici family living in a low-income area of Rome, turns their lives upside down. Tilde, the mother, devotes herself entirely to caring for Dario, neglecting her husband Pietro and their other son Gabriele. During a severe crisis, Dario is readmitted to the asylum, and Tilde insists on using all their money to bribe the nurses for better treatment.

Pietro, a tailor, can't oppose his wife's obsession but manages to find Gabriele a job in a construction company to distance him from the family's distress. Gabriele falls for Marcella, a colleague, who ultimately chooses their wealthy boss over him.

In a final attempt to cure Dario, Tilde takes him to Vienna for treatment. However, Dario's condition worsens, and he threatens his mother before being readmitted to the asylum. Tilde dies of a heart attack, leaving Pietro to care for Dario alone, but he finds solace in successfully separating Gabriele from the family turmoil.

== Cast ==
- Nino Castelnuovo: Gabriele Dominici
- Tomas Milian: Dario Dominici
- Madeleine Robinson: Tilde
- Tino Carraro: Pietro
- Franca Bettoia: Marcella
- Milly: Luisella
- Riccardo Garrone: un cliente di Pietro Dominici
- Mario Scaccia: un infermiere del manicomio
- Rosalia Maggio: collega di Marcella
- Lino Troisi: un agente di Polizia
- Marcella Rovena: amica di Pietro Dominici
- Alvaro Piccardi: Daniele
- Mario Brega: un borgataro
