= Alfredo, Alfredo =

1972 film

- Directed by: Pietro Germi
- Written by: Pietro Germi; Leonardo Benvenuti; Piero De Bernardi; Tullio Pinelli
- Produced by: Guglielmo Colonna
- Starring: Dustin Hoffman; Stefania Sandrelli; Carla Gravina
- Cinematography: Aiace Parolin
- Music by: Carlo Rustichelli
- Distributed by: Cineriz (Italy); Paramount (US)
- Release dates: 4 August 1972 (Italy); 17 December 1973 (US)
- Running time: 110 minutes (Italy); 98 minutes (US)
- Language: Italian

Alfredo, Alfredo is a 1972 Italian comedy film co-written and directed by Pietro Germi.

== Plot ==
The film, told mostly in flashback, tells the story of a timid bank clerk living in Ascoli Piceno, Italy, who finds himself swept into dating and marrying a possessive woman. He endures stress as her behavior in their marriage becomes increasingly domineering, and faces obstacles in leaving her for a more amenable woman, in a time when divorce was still illegal in Italy.

== Cast ==
- Dustin Hoffman: Alfredo Sbisà
- Stefania Sandrelli: Maria Rosa Cavarani
- Carla Gravina: Carolina Bettini
- Duilio Del Prete: Oreste
- Saro Urzì: Father of Mariarosa
- Emanuela Fallini:the shaman
- Danika La Loggia: Mother of Maria Rosa
- Clara Colosimo: Mother of Carolina
- Gino Baghetti: Father of Alfredo
- Vittorio Duse: judge
- Mario Frera: assistant of the judge
- Renzo Marignano: doctor

== Production ==
Germi's first choice for the Alfredo role was Nino Manfredi. The film was completely shot in Ascoli Piceno, Italy.

== Awards ==
- Golden Globe nominee: Best Foreign Language Film
- David di Donatello: Best Film
- U.S. National Board of Review nominee: Best Foreign Language Film

== Reception ==
The New York Times critic Nora Sayre found the film not "a bad movie" but "merely a disappointment because of the immense talent involved", criticizing the choice of Hoffman as the lead as "he simply can't appear to be a native of a provincial Italian town—any more than Dwight Eisenhower could have convinced us that he was a sleek Roman count", and considering the film as "a rather diluted version" of Divorce Italian Style and Seduced and Abandoned.
