= Saro Urzì =

Italian film director and actor (1913–1979)

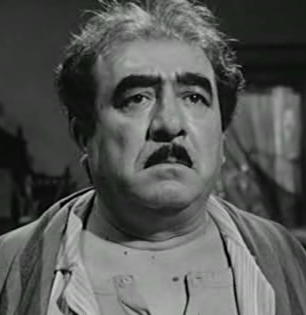
- Urzì in Seduced and Abandoned (1964)
- Born: Rosario Urzì; 24 February 1913; Catania, Sicily, Italy
- Died: 1 November 1979 (aged 66); San Giuseppe Vesuviano, Campania, Italy
- Resting place: Cimitero di Ottaviano, Naples, Campania, Italy
- Occupation: Actor
- Years active: 1939–1977

Rosario "Saro" Urzì (24 February 1913 – 1 November 1979) was an Italian actor. He is best known for his roles in the films In the Name of the Law (1949), The Railroad Man (1956), Seduced and Abandoned (1964), which earned him a Cannes Film Festival Award for Best Actor, and The Godfather (1972).

== Biography ==
Born in Sicily, he moved to Rome to seek his fortune. He met Pietro Germi in 1949 and appears in Germi's In nome della legge, a film for which he won Nastro d'Argento as Best Supporting Actor. He became Germi's favourite actor, working together with him in Path of Hope (1950), The Railroad Man (1956), The Facts of Murder (1959), Alfredo, Alfredo (1972) and most notably Seduced and Abandoned in 1964. That film earned him Best Actor awards at the Cannes Film Festival and the Nastro d'Argento the following year.

He acted in Don Camillo sequels, John Huston's Beat the Devil, Luigi Comencini's Bread, Love and Jealousy, and international films such as Woman of Straw, and Francis Ford Coppola's The Godfather as Signor Vitelli, father of Michael Corleone's first wife Apollonia.

== Selected filmography ==
- The Dream of Butterfly (1939)
- La conquista dell'aria (1939)
- Senza cielo (1940) - Un portatore
- Tosca (1941) - (uncredited)
- Marco Visconti (1941)
- La compagnia della teppa (1941)
- Pia de' Tolomei (1941)
- A Pistol Shot (1942) - Uno dei servitori alla scampagnata (uncredited)
- Giorno di nozze (1942)
- Odessa in fiamme (1942) - (uncredited)
- Harlem (1943)
- Special Correspondents (1943) - Un soldato
- The Peddler and the Lady (1943) - (uncredited)
- The Innkeeper (1944)
- La freccia nel fianco (1945) - (uncredited)
- Tombolo, paradiso nero (1947)
- Immigrants (1948)
- In the Name of the Law (1949) - Il maresciallo Grifò
- Monastero di Santa Chiara (1949) - Il direttore del teatro
- Hand of Death (1949) - zingaro Marco
- Pact with the Devil (1950)
- Hawk of the Nile (1950) - Sahid
- Mistress of the Mountains (1950) - sindaco Giusà
- Barrier to the North (1950) - Il brigadiere
- Path of Hope (1950) - Ciccio Ingaggiatore
- Il monello della strada (1950) - Il commissario
- The Crossroads (1951) - Il brigadiere Carmelo Carlin
- La vendetta del corsaro (1951) - Aguirre
- Trieste mia! (1951)
- The Counterfeiters (1951) - Maresciallo Terlizi
- Black Fire (1951)
- Little World of Don Camillo (1952) - Brusco
- A Mother Returns (1952)
- The Bandit of Tacca Del Lupo (1952) - Police commissioner Siceli
- Fratelli d'Italia (1952)
- Io, Amleto (1952)
- The Return of Don Camillo (1953) - Brusco - il barbiere
- Cronaca di un delitto (1953) - Martino
- Beat the Devil (1953) - Captain of SS Nyanga
- Rivalry (1953)
- Public Opinion (1954)
- Cañas y barro (1954) - Cañamel
- Bread, Love and Jealousy (1954) - Il capocomico
- I cinque dell'Adamello (1954) - Briscola
- Don Camillo's Last Round (1955) - Brusco, il parucchiere / Brusco, le coiffeur
- La ladra (1955) - Il Caporale
- Motivo in maschera (1955)
- The Railroad Man (1956) - Gigi Liverani
- Engaged to Death (1957) - Tulio
- Marchands de filles (1957)
- Nature Girl and the Slaver (1957) - Polizist Emilio
- Dinanzi a noi il cielo (1957) - Padre di Tom
- A Man of Straw (1958) - Beppe
- Romarei, das Mädchen mit den grünen Augen (1958) - Koch Peppino
- ...And the Wild Wild Women (1959) - Maresciallo del carcere
- Son of the Red Corsair (1959) - Mendoza
- I mafiosi (1959)
- The Facts of Murder (1959) - Maresciallo Saro
- Seven in the Sun (1960) - Fernand
- Ça va être ta fête (1960) - Alvarez
- Cavalcata selvaggia (1960)
- Les filles sèment le vent (1961) - Buonacasa
- A Day for Lionhearts (1961) - Il sergente
- Don Camillo: Monsignor (1961) - Brusco, il sindaco
- Lo sgarro (1962)
- Divorzio alla siciliana (1963)
- Seduced and Abandoned (1964) - Don Vincenzo Ascalone
- The Sucker (1965) - Tagliella, un garagiste à Naples (uncredited)
- Don Camillo in Moscow (1965) - Brusco
- Mission to Caracas (1965) - Emile Vasson
- Le Chant du monde (1965) - Carle
- Fortuna (1966) - Monsieur Simon
- Me, Me, Me... and the Others (1966) - 2nd Praying Man
- Modesty Blaise (1966) - Basilio
- The Road to Corinthe (1967) - Kalhides
- Gente d'onore (1967)
- Vivre la nuit (1968)
- Serafino (1968) - Uncle Agenore
- Un caso di coscienza (1970) - Pharmacist
- La prima notte del dottor Danieli, industriale, col complesso del... giocattolo (1970) - The doctor
- Le inibizioni del dottor Gaudenzi, vedovo, col complesso della buonanima (1971) - John Cardaci
- The Godfather (1972) - Signor Vitelli - Sicilian Sequence
- Alfredo, Alfredo (1972) - Maria Rosa's father
- Black Turin (1972) - Jaco
- Il caso Pisciotta (1972) - Don Vincenzo Coluzzi
- Sgarro alla camorra (1973)
- Il figlioccio del padrino (1973) - Don Salvatore Trizzino
- Il sergente Rompiglioni diventa... caporale (1975) - Corporal Martucci
- Giovannino (1976) - Giovannino's father
- Occhio alla vedova! (1976)
