= Leopoldo Trieste =

Italian actor, film director and script writer (1917–2003)

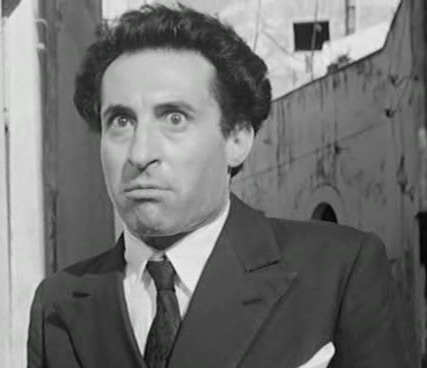
- Leopoldo Trieste in Seduced and Abandoned (1964)
- Born: 3 May 1917; Reggio Calabria, Italy
- Died: 25 January 2003 (aged 85); Rome, Italy
- Occupation: Actor
- Years active: 1946–2001

Leopoldo Trieste (3 May 1917 – 25 January 2003) was an Italian actor, film director, screenwriter and playwright. He worked with directors such as Federico Fellini, Francis Ford Coppola, Pietro Germi, Giuseppe Tornatore, Mario Bava, Tinto Brass, Charles Vidor, Jean-Jacques Annaud and René Clément.

== Life and career ==
Born in Reggio Calabria, Trieste was the son of a Socialist railway worker who died when he was ten, leaving him and his two sisters orphaned and in difficult financial circumstances. Moved to Rome, he became friends with poet Salvatore Quasimodo, got a degree in letters with Natalino Sapegno in 1939, and was awarded a scholarship in ethnology studies to Boston, which he could not use because of the outbreak of World War II. In 1939, driven by his infatuation with actress Adriana Benetti, he enrolled at the Centro Sperimentale di Cinematografia; drafted soon afterward, he served in the infantry and later in a film unit in Sicily shooting propaganda footage, before deserting in 1944 and returning to Rome.

The author of numerous plays, Trieste made his official debut in 1945, with the drama La frontiera, staged at the Teatro Quirino. His 1946 drama play Febbre di vivere was later adapted into a film, Eager to Live, directed by Claudio Gora and starring Marcello Mastroianni. He first entered the film industry as a screenwriter, collaborating among others in Pietro Germi's Lost Youth and Gora's The Sky Is Red.

While Trieste initially had no acting ambitions, his friend Federico Fellini launched him as an actor, first giving him the husband role in The White Sheik, and later making him play an aspiring playwright in I Vitelloni. Trieste soon embarked on an intense career as a character actor and also directed two films, Città di notte and Il peccato degli anni verdi, whose poor box office performance led him to abandon further attempts at directing.

In the early 1960s, Trieste earned critical acclaim for his performances in Nanni Loy's A Day for Lionhearts and Pietro Germi's black comedies Divorce Italian Style and Seduced and Abandoned, the latter of which gave him a Nastro d'Argento Award for Best Supporting Actor. In 1974, he played one of his better known roles, the landlord Don Roberto, in The Godfather Part II. In 1985, he won a second Nastro d'Argento for Marco Bellocchio's Henry IV. Starting from the 1980s, he mainly worked with young and upcoming directors such as Roberto Andò, Alessandro Di Robilant, and Giuseppe Tornatore, whose The Star Maker got him a third Nastro as well as a David di Donatello. He was also active on television, notably appearing in Quo Vadis?, The Betrothed, and guest-starring in an episode of Inspector Montalbano.

Trieste died in his sleep from a heart attack on 25 January 2003, at the age of 85.

== Filmography as actor ==
- Preludio d'amore (1947) as Paolo
- The Counterfeiters (1951) as Brigadiere Caputo
- The White Sheik (1952) as Ivan Cavalli
- I Vitelloni (1953) as Leopoldo Vannucci
- A Day in Court (1954) as Leopoldo
- Where Is Freedom? (1954) as Abramo Piperno
- An American in Rome (1954) as Spettatore alla TV
- Via Padova 46 (1954) as The Man with a Cigarette
- The Sign of Venus (1955) as Pittore
- Buonanotte... avvocato! (1955) as Neighbor (uncredited)
- Il padrone sono me (1955) as Il filosofo
- Destination Piovarolo (1955) as L'ispettore delle ferrovie
- Il coraggio (1955) as Rag. Rialti
- We're All Necessary (1956)
- A Hero of Our Times (1957) as Aurelio
- A Farewell to Arms (1957) as Passini
- Città di notte (1958)
- I ragazzi dei Parioli (1959) as Anarchist
- Everyone's in Love (1959) as Cipriani
- Avventura a Capri (1959) as Professore Cavicchio
- The Moralist (1959) as The Advertising Designer
- Le svedesi (1960) as Alessio
- The Joy of Living (1961) as Anarchist artist
- A Day for Lionhearts (1961) as Michele
- Divorce, Italian Style (1961) as Carmelo Patanè
- The Eye of the Needle (1963) as Calogero Lo Niro
- Il Successo (1963) as Grassi
- Seduced and Abandoned (1964) as Il barone Rizieri Zappalà
- Panic Button (1964)
- Via Veneto (1964)
- White Voices (1964) as 'Orapronobbi'
- Last Plane to Baalbek (1964) as Pagani
- Bianco, rosso, giallo, rosa (1964) as Il psichiatra
- Sedotti e bidonati (1964) as don Marcuzzo
- Weekend, Italian Style (1966) as Professor Ferri
- A Maiden for a Prince (1966) as Davide
- A Question of Honour (1966) as Advocate Mazzullo
- Shoot Loud, Louder... I Don't Understand (1966) as Carlo Saporito
- We Still Kill the Old Way (1967) as Deputato Comunista
- Assicurasi vergine (1967) as Lorenzino Conozza
- La ragazza del bersagliere (1967) as Sergeant
- On My Way to the Crusades, I Met a Girl Who... (1967) as Minor Role
- Gente d'onore (1967)
- Escalation (1968) as Il sacerdote / il santone
- Be Sick... It's Free (1968) as Pietro
- The Shoes of the Fisherman (1968) as Dying Man's Friend
- La prova generale (1968)
- The Secret of Santa Vittoria (1969) as Vittorini
- The Sicilian Clan (1969) as Turi - l'expert en timbres
- Togli le gambe dl parabrezza (1969)
- Rose Spot (1969) as L'attore
- Pussycat, Pussycat, I Love You (1970) as Desk Clerk
- The Adventures of Gerard (1970) as Marshal Henri Massena
- The Golden Ass (1970) as Rufinio
- The Martlet's Tale (1970)
- Crepa padrone, crepa tranquillo (1970)
- La Poudre d'escampette (1971) as Le sergent du fort
- La vacanza (1971) as Judge
- A Bay of Blood (1971) as Paolo
- Il sorriso del ragno (1971)
- Trastevere (1971) as Il professore
- Stress (1971)
- Master of Love (1972) as Husband of Fiora
- Una cavalla tutta nuda (1972) as Marito di Gemmata
- Every Little Crook and Nanny (1972) as Truffatore
- Pulp (1972) as Marcovic
- Anche se volessi lavorare, che faccio? (1972) as Maresciallo Capriotti
- My Pleasure Is Your Pleasure (1973)
- Viaggia, ragazza, viaggia, hai la musica nelle vene (1973)
- Don't Look Now (1973) as Hotel Manager
- The Lady Has Been Raped (1973) as The psychoanalyst
- Fischia il sesso (1974) as Leonard
- Commissariato di notturna (1974) as Brigadiere Spanò
- L'albero dalle foglie rosa (1974)
- Don't Hurt Me, My Love (1974) as Avv. Musumeci
- The Profiteer (1974)
- The Godfather Part II (1974) as Signor Roberto
- I baroni (1975) as Il cerimoniere
- L'ammazzatina (1975) as Tuccio Langatta
- Vergine e di nome Maria (1975) as Nicola
- Due cuori, una cappella (1975) as Custode cimitero
- Son tornate a fiorire le rose (1975) as Pattavina
- Private Lessons (1975) as The Exhibitionist
- Hallucination Strip (1975)
- Perdutamente tuo...mi firmo Macaluso Carmelo fu Giuseppe (1976) as don Calogero Liotta
- Lezioni di violoncello con toccata e fuga (1976) as Silenzio
- L'uomo di Corleone (1977)
- Il giorno dell'Assunta (1977)
- Caligola (1979) as Charicles
- The Black Stallion (1979) as Priest
- L'albero della maldicenza (1979) as Don Cicco
- Flatfoot in Egypt (1980) as Prof. Coriolano Cerullo
- Sweet Pea (1981) as The tramp
- Il marchese del Grillo (1981) as Padre Sabino
- Malamore (1982) as L'amministratore
- Trenchcoat (1983) as Esteban Ortega
- Henry IV (1984) as Psychiatrist
- Momo (1986) as Beppo
- The Name of the Rose (1986) as Michele da Cesena
- Il coraggio di parlare (1987) as Don Bruno
- Stradivari (1988) as Nicolò Amati
- Cinema Paradiso (1988) as Father Adelfio
- Don Bosco (1988) as Don Borel
- I giorni randagi (1988) as Caronte
- The Dark Sun (1990) as Alfonso Isgrò
- Viaggio d'amore (1990) as The Carrettiere
- Law of Courage (1994) as Mr. Livatino
- Italia Village (1994)
- The Star Maker (1995) as Mute
- Ojos de amatista (1996)
- Marianna Ucria (1997) as Pretore Camaleo
- The Prince's Manuscript (2000) as Lucio Piccolo
- The Council of Egypt (2002) as Padre Salvatore
- Legami di famiglia (2002)
- Quota 16 (2011) as Giovanni (final film role)
