= A Crime of Honor =

1960 novel by Giovanni Arpino

A Crime of Honor (Italian: Un dellito d'onore) is a 1960 novel by Italian author Giovanni Arpino, first published by Mondadori. It was published in the United States by Braziller in 1963, and was his second novel to be translated into English. Arpino uses the novel to denounce moral and social prejudices linked to honour killing, once used as extenuating circumstance in Italian law.

The novel was a runner up for the Strega Prize in 1961, and was adapted into Pietro Germi’s highly regarded 1961 comedy Divorce, Italian Style, starring Marcello Mastroianni.

== Plot ==
=== Part one ===
Gaetano Castiglia, aged thirty-nine is a doctor from an affluent family who studied in Boston but isn't practising. He lives with his mother Maddalena in Montrone, in the area near Avellino, while Vincenzo, his father, died a long time before. Gaetano falls in love with Sabina, a barely seventeen-year-old girl after they meet each other by chance during a procession. His mother is against their marriage, because Sabina is a poor, uncultured orphan who has worked in a tavern run by an aunt. Gaetano becomes hardheaded and does everything he can to persuade his mother to accept Sabina. He is very jealous and is worried about the fact that Sabina can make bad experiences at the inn, frequented by farmers and drunkards. To prepare for the marriage, he forces Sabina to move to another aunt's house in Atripalda, a nearby town, to learn to read and write and to behave in a more dignified way because he doesn't want her to have relationships with other people of lower class.

=== Part two ===
The marriage is celebrated. On the wedding night, in a hotel in Naples, Gaetano becomes aware of the fact that Sabina is not a virgin. At first she denies this but she is later forced to reveal that she has had a sexual relationship with Vincenzo Carbone, an officer in Turin. Initially, he raped her in a stable, but later she convinced herself to see him in her house, because Elena, Carbone's sister, promised her a marriage with her brother.

On hearing this, Gaetano decides to go back to Montrone. The following night, he kills Sabina by slitting her throat with a razor blade. He then goes to Elena, who runs a shop and kills her with a revolver. He then hands himself over to the police.

=== Part three ===
Gaetano's mother decides to entrust the defence to the well-known Neapolitan lawyer Gioacchino Russo, who was contacted with difficulty by the lawyer, Colantuoni and by the priest, Alfonso, Gaetano's uncle. Gioacchino Russo meets Gaetano's mother and here learns from don Alfonso the fact that the fascists want to help Gaetano, to whom they offered the role of major: Russo, a dedicated liberal, refuses to sign any alliance but says he will accept every kind of help that can come from them. Then he starts to prepare the trial using the list of witnesses to know if they have lovers, if they have been betrayed, and so on. He also seeks the help of the press: some young people that come from Avellino, want to find a newspaper, and Russo recommends to them to point, for a financing to Gaetano's mother. Russo goes to visit Gaetano, who is in jail and is waiting with composure for the trail: the considerations of the last days, he says, have changed him deeply. In front of the reaction of Gaetano, Russo loses control and forces him to vow to have firmly made justice, since he is sure that, by doing so, Gaetano will get away with murder. So Russo goes home, promising to Gaetano that he will soon be major and feeling more sound and satisfied.

== Editions ==
- Giovanni Arpino (1965). Un delitto d'onore (collana Gli Oscar ed.). Mondadori. p. 177.

== See also ==
- Murder of Hina Saleem - An honour killing in northern Italy
