= Amori pericolosi =

1964 film

- Directed by: Alfredo Giannetti; Carlo Lizzani; Giulio Questi
- Screenplay by: Giulio Questi; Franco Brusati; Carlo Lizzani; Alfredo Giannetti
- Story by: Giulio Questi; Alfredo Giannetti
- Produced by: Moris Ergas
- Starring: Grégoire Aslan; Frank Wolff
- Cinematography: Leonida Barboni; Alvaro Mancori; Tonino Delli Colli
- Edited by: Franco Arcalli; Franco Fraticeli; Ruggero Mastroianni
- Production companies: Fulco Film; Zebra Film; Aera Film
- Distributed by: Cineriz
- Release date: 14 August 1964 (Italy)
- Countries: Italy; France
- Box office: 48.3 million Italian lire

Amori pericolosi is a 1964 anthology film consisting of three segments directed by Alfredo Giannetti, Carlo Lizzani and Giulio Questi.

== Cast ==
Il generale

- Grégoire Aslan: The General
- Sandra Milo: The lover of the General
- Marco Tulli

La ronda

- Frank Wolff: The husband
- Ornella Vanoni: The prostitute
- Vittorio Congia
- Glauco Onorato

Il passo

- Frank Wolff: The husband
- Juliette Mayniel: The wife
- Graziella Granata: The maid
- Jean Sorel: The legionary
- Gérard Blain: The attendant
- Bice Valori: The servant

== Production ==
Director Giulio Questi was a last minute addition as a director for Amori pericolosi. Questi recalled that Peppino Amato and Moris Ergas were both the initial producers for the film and that Amato died which led to Ergas taking over as the producer. The film was shot in 1961 and only released later in 1964.

== Release ==
Amori pericolosi was distributed theatrically in Italy by Cineriz on 14 August 1964. The film grossed a total of 48,300,000 Italian lire. Film historian and critic Roberto Curti described the films box office presence in Italy as being "passed unnoticed".

== Reception ==
According to Curti, critics did not like Amori pericolosi, especially "Il passo" directed by Giulio Questi, with critic Alberto Abruzzese finding it conveying "an old and decrepit theme with a formal refinement that was between mannered decadence and a misunderstood naturalism."
