= Four Ways Out =

1951 film

- Italian film poster
- Directed by: Pietro Germi
- Written by: Luigi Comencini; Federico Fellini; Pietro Germi; Tullio Pinelli
- Produced by: Eduardo Capolino
- Starring: Gina Lollobrigida; Renato Baldini; Cosetta Greco
- Cinematography: Carlo Montuori
- Edited by: Rolando Benedetti
- Music by: Carlo Rustichelli
- Production company: Società Italiana Cines
- Distributed by: Variety Films
- Release date: 12 October 1951
- Running time: 84 minutes
- Country: Italy
- Language: Italian

Four Ways Out (Italian: La città si difende) is a 1951 Italian crime film directed by Pietro Germi and starring Gina Lollobrigida, Renato Baldini and Cosetta Greco. The film won the award for Best Italian Film at the 1951 Venice Film Festival.

The film's sets were designed by the art director Carlo Egidi. It was shot at the Cinecittà Studios and on location around Rome.

== Plot ==
Four thieves, Paolo, Luigi, Guido and Alberto steal the proceeds of a football match at the stadium and run away. These are not habitual offenders, but poor people from various social backgrounds who hope to find opportunities for a better life in theft.

Paolo, a former footballer whose career was interrupted by an injury, tries with money to win back the favors of his ex-lover Daniela, but she rejects him and denounces him. Luigi, unemployed with a dependent wife and daughter, manages to receive only a small part of the booty from Paolo; with this money he tries to escape to the countryside with his family, but on the tram, when the tickets are checked, his nerves give way: after a short escape, in the throes of guilt, he commits suicide with a gunshot.

Guido is the most marginalized of the group, the only one devoid of emotional ties: from a drawing professor he became a walking portraitist and then turned to crime. He has the bulk of the booty with him, with which he would like to flee to Corsica, evading border controls. But the traffickers he turns to for illegal expatriation kill him and steal the money.

Alberto is the youngest and still lives with his parents; he almost immediately runs out of money and wanders aimlessly for a while, not daring to set foot home to escape arrest. When in the end, with no prospects of any kind, he decides to go home, he finds the police waiting for him. Desperate, he decides to flee to the ledge, from which, without any way out, he too threatens to jump; but the touching speech of his mother persuades him to face the consequences of his act.

== Cast ==
- Gina Lollobrigida as Daniela
- Renato Baldini as Paolo
- Cosetta Greco as Lina
- Paul Muller as Guido
- Enzo Maggio Jr. as Alberto
- Fausto Tozzi as Luigi
- Tamara Lees as Tamara
- Emma Baron as Alberto's Mother
- Ferdinando Lattanzi as Alberto's Father

== Bibliography ==
- Roberto Curti. Italian Crime Filmography, 1968–1980. McFarland, 2013.
