= The Climax (1967 film) =

1967 film

- Directed by: Pietro Germi
- Written by: Carlo Bernari; Pietro Germi; Alfredo Giannetti; Tullio Pinelli
- Produced by: Pietro Germi; Robert Haggiag
- Starring: Ugo Tognazzi; Stefania Sandrelli; Gigi Ballista
- Cinematography: Aiace Parolin
- Edited by: Sergio Montanari
- Music by: Carlo Rustichelli
- Release date: May 1967
- Running time: 100 minutes
- Country: Italy
- Language: Italian

The Climax (Italian: L'immorale, also known as Too Much for One Man) is a 1967 Italian dark comedy film directed by Pietro Germi. It was entered into the 1967 Cannes Film Festival.

== Cast ==
- Ugo Tognazzi as Sergio Masini
- Stefania Sandrelli as Marisa Malagugini
- Renée Longarini as Giulia Masini
- Maria Grazia Carmassi as Adele Baistrocchi
- Gigi Ballista as Don Michele
- Sergio Fincato as Calasanti
- Marco Della Giovanna as Riccardo Masini
- Ildebrando Santafe as Caputo
- Riccardo Billi as Filiberto Malagugini
- Carlo Bagno as Mr. Malagugini
- Lina Lagalla as Mrs. Malagugini
- Stefano Chierchiè as Bruno
- Costantino Bramini as Nini
- Cinzia Sperapani as Luisa
- Mimosa Gregoretti as Mita
- Giorgio Bianchi as Doctor
