= A Day for Lionhearts =

1961 Italian war - drama film

- Directed by: Nanni Loy
- Starring: Tomas Milian
- Cinematography: Marcello Gatti
- Edited by: Ruggero Mastroianni
- Music by: Carlo Rustichelli
- Release date: 1961
- Country: Italy
- Language: Italian

Un giorno da leoni (internationally released as A Day for Lionhearts) is a 1961 Italian war drama film directed by Nanni Loy. The film describes the gradual evolution towards anti-fascism of Italian people during the Second World War.

== Cast ==
- Renato Salvatori: Orlando
- Tomas Milian: Gino Migliacci
- Nino Castelnuovo: Danilo
- Romolo Valli: Edoardo
- Leopoldo Trieste: Michele
- Carla Gravina: Mariuccia
- Anna Maria Ferrero: Ida
- Valeria Moriconi: Orlando's wife
- Saro Urzì: the sergeant
- Corrado Pani: Mortati
- Carlo D'Angelo: the priest
- Tino Bianchi: the father of Danilo
- Gigi Ballista: the friar
- Enzo Turco: Commissioner of Police
- Regina Bianchi: Edoardo's wife
- Rina Franchetti: the plebeian
