= Kill Me Quick, I'm Cold =

1967 film by Francesco Maselli

- Theatrical release poster
- Italian: Fai in fretta ad uccidermi... ho freddo!
- Directed by: Francesco Maselli
- Screenplay by: Francesco Maselli; Biagio Proietti; Andrea Barbato; Ennio De Concini
- Story by: Francesco Maselli; Biagio Proietti
- Produced by: Franco Cristaldi
- Starring: Monica Vitti; Jean Sorel; Roberto Bisacco; Daniela Surina
- Cinematography: Alfio Contini
- Edited by: Nicoletta Nardi
- Music by: Gianni Marchetti
- Production companies: Vides; Columbia Film
- Distributed by: C.E.I.A.D. (Italy)
- Release date: 7 September 1967 (Italy)
- Running time: 99 minutes
- Countries: Italy; France
- Language: Italian

Kill Me Quick, I'm Cold (Italian: Fai in fretta ad uccidermi... ho freddo!) is a 1967 crime comedy film directed by Francesco Maselli and starring Monica Vitti, Jean Sorel, Roberto Bisacco and Daniela Surina.

== Plot ==
After meeting in a luxury hotel on the Italian Riviera, Giovanna and Franco discover that they are both con artists and subsequently become lovers. Together, the two scam wealthy guests by pretending to be siblings.

One day, Giovanna and Franco meet Cristiana, who tells them that she is being threatened by her brother Sergio over a large inheritance that she alone has received from their grandfather. As they plot to get their hands on Cristiana's inheritance money, Giovanna and Franco, still posing as siblings, accompany her to London under the guise of protecting her from Sergio. Since the grandfather's will stipulates that Cristiana must be married in order to receive the inheritance, Giovanna instructs Franco to marry her and get her to grant him power of attorney before killing her, since the blame would fall on Sergio.

Upon arrival in London, Franco checks into a hotel room with Cristiana. Giovanna checks into a room downstairs on her own and is surprised by Sergio, who proclaims his attraction to her before denouncing Cristiana as a compulsive liar. He also suspects that Cristiana had a hand in their grandfather's death. After Sergio leaves, Franco arrives, and Giovanna voices her suspicion that Cristiana plans to marry Franco just to obtain the money and then dump him. Giovanna later meets with Sergio and lies that Franco is madly in love with Cristiana.

At Sergio's recommendation, Franco and Cristiana both sign a life insurance policy. Afterwards, Giovanna and Franco begin to plot Cristiana's murder in order to claim a life insurance payment, while Giovanna tricks Sergio into believing that they will kill each other's siblings the following evening by having them drown in the River Thames. Giovanna rushes to Franco's hotel room but only finds Cristiana, who has found recent investment projects in Franco's briefcase that he had not shared with Giovanna, who feels betrayed by Franco.

The next evening, Giovanna and Franco drive a Rolls-Royce to a dock, where they plan to murder Cristiana by drowning her inside the Rolls-Royce and stage her death as an accident. Franco admits to his secret investment projects, saying he had foreseen the possibility of continuing his exploits without Giovanna. Feeling that Franco no longer loves her and only cares about money, Giovanna gets into the Rolls-Royce and tells Franco, "Kill me quick, I'm cold." Franco is confused, and the Rolls-Royce falls into the river with Giovanna inside.

In a panic, Franco runs back to his hotel room, only to find Sergio and Cristiana, who are actually lovers pretending to be siblings. As Sergio and Cristiana tie Franco up, intending to kill him, Franco informs them that they will not receive the insurance payout, as insurance companies investigate the identity of the deceased, not the beneficiary, and they will discover that Franco is a con artist in case he is killed. Giovanna, who is revealed to have survived, returns to the hotel room, and when it transpires that both couples had been posing as siblings and pretending to be rich, they all burst into laughter.

== Cast ==
- Monica Vitti as Giovanna
- Jean Sorel as Franco
- Roberto Bisacco as Sergio
- Daniela Surina as Christina
- Barbara Pilavin as Ruth Clay
- John Stacy as Albert Clay
- Tom Felleghy as Dick Marton
- Madeline Foy as Alice Martin
- Gianni Solaro (credited as Giovanni Solaro)
- Enzo Maggio (credited as Vincenzo Maggio)
- Max Turilli
- Tullio Altamura
