= Leonida Barboni =

Italian cinematographer (1909–1970)

- Born: 23 November 1909; Fiuminata, Italy
- Died: 6 November 1970 (aged 60); Rome, Italy
- Occupation: Cinematographer

Leonida Barboni (23 November 1909 – 6 November 1970) was an Italian film cinematographer.

== Life and career ==
Born in Fiuminata, Macerata, Barboni started his career working as a cameraman for Fox Movietone and Paramount newsreels. He later worked as a cinematographer for documentaries, and in 1942 he made his feature film debut with La fanciulla dell'altra riva. After the war Barboni started a critical acclaimed collaboration with the director Pietro Germi and with the set designer Carlo Egidi. His style was characterized by the proliferation of small light sources, a great attention to detail and by the use of 'deep focus' shots. He was the elder brother of the cinematographer and director Enzo Barboni.

== Selected filmography ==
- A Night of Fame (1949)
- In the Name of the Law (1949)
- Sunday in August (1950)
- Path of Hope (1950)
- The Devil in the Convent (1950)
- Ragazze da marito (1952)
- Red Shirts (1952)
- The Bandit of Tacca Del Lupo (1952)
- Mademoiselle Gobete (1952)
- Jealousy (1953)
- The Enchanting Enemy (1953)
- Neapolitans in Milan (1953)
- Adriana Lecouvreur (1955)
- Angela (1955)
- Il coraggio (1955)
- The Railroad Man (1956)
- Dreams in a Drawer (1956)
- Fathers and Sons (1957)
- A Man of Straw (1958)
- ...And the Wild Wild Women (1959)
- The Great War (1959)
- The Facts of Murder (1959)
- The Hunchback of Rome (1960)
- The Passionate Thief (1960)
- Run with the Devil (1960)
- The Traffic Policeman (1960)
- Divorce Italian Style (1961)
- Black City (1961)
- The Lovemakers (1961)
- A Difficult Life (1961)
- Disorder (1962)
- The Captive City (1962)
- The Verona Trial (1963)
- Liolà (1963)
- Corruption (1963)
- Countersex (1964)
- Amori pericolosi (1964)
- The Possessed (1965)
- The Dolls (1965)
- After the Fox (1966)
- Pleasant Nights (1966)
- Sex Quartet (1966)
- The Witch (1966)
- El Greco (1966)
- The Rover (1967)
- Bora Bora (1968)
- The Sex of Angels (1968)
- Tre donne - La sciantosa (ТВ) (1970)
- 1870 (1971)
