= Roberto Bisacco =

Italian television, stage and film actor (1939–2022)

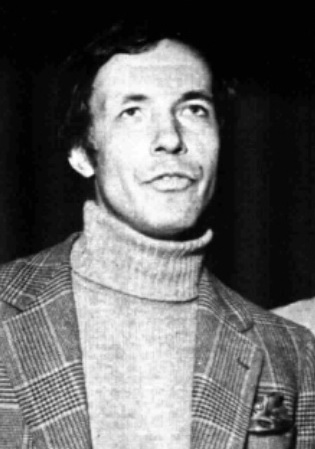
- Bisacco in 1975
- Born: 1 March 1939; Turin, Italy
- Died: 10 October 2022 (aged 83); Rome, Italy
- Occupation: Actor
- Years active: 1939–2022

Roberto Bisacco (1 March 1939 – 10 October 2022) was an Italian television, stage and film actor.

== Life and career ==
Born in Turin, after enrolling at the university in the faculty of economics and having worked for a year as an accountant in a large company, Bisacco decided to pursue an acting career and enrolled at the Accademia d'Arte Drammatica in Rome in 1960. He made his film debut in 1963, as the main actor of Gli arcangeli by Enzo Battaglia. Bisacco's breakout role was Mario in the RAI television series I miserabili (1964) directed by Sandro Bolchi; later Bisacco appeared in roles of weight on several successful television works and also began a busy stage career, while his film career was less significant, with dozens of roles of little weight.

== Selected filmography ==
- The Archangels (1963) - Roberto
- Modesty Blaise (1966) - Enrico
- Kill Me Quick, I'm Cold (1967) - Sergio
- Col cuore in gola (1967) - David
- Romeo and Juliet (1968) - Paris
- Fräulein Doktor (1969) - Schell
- I dannati della Terra (1969)
- Camille 2000 (1969) - Gastion
- Detective Belli (1969) - Claudio
- Delitto al circolo del tennis (1969) - Sandro
- Vergogna schifosi (1969) - Andrea
- Lady Caliph (1970) - Bisacco
- Torso (1973) - Stefano Vanzi
- Hospitals: The White Mafia (1973) - Donati
- Stavisky (1974) - Juan Montalvo de Montalbon
- La Cage aux Folles II (1980) - Ralph
- The Assisi Underground (1985) - Prof. Rieti
- Vendetta dal futuro (1986) - Cooper
- Grandi cacciatori (1988) - Hermann
- Millions (1991) - Osvaldo Ferretti
- Infelici e contenti (1992) - Petrilli
- Mashamal - ritorno al deserto (1998) - Mantovano
- Lo strano caso del signor Kappa (2001)
