= In the Name of the Law (1949 film) =

In the Name of Law
- Directed by: Pietro Germi
- Written by: Pietro Germi; Federico Fellini; Giuseppe Mangione; Aldo Bizzarri; Tullio Pinelli
- Produced by: Luigi Rovere
- Starring: Massimo Girotti; Saro Urzì; Jone Solinas
- Cinematography: Leonida Barboni
- Edited by: Rolando Benedetti
- Music by: Carlo Rustichelli
- Distributed by: Lux Film
- Release date: 13 March 1949 (Italian release)
- Running time: 100 minutes
- Language: Italian

In the Name of the Law (Italian: In nome della legge) is a 1949 Italian language mafia drama film directed by Pietro Germi. It Is based on Giuseppe Guido Lo Schiavo's novel Piccola pretura. Federico Fellini co-wrote the script. The style of the film is close to Italian neorealism film movement.

== Cast ==
- Massimo Girotti – Il pretore Guido Schiavi
- Jone Salinas – La baronessa Teresa Lo Vasto
- Camillo Mastrocinque – Il barone Lo Vasto
- Charles Vanel – Massaro Turi Passalacqua
- Saro Urzì – Il maresciallo Grifò
- Turi Pandolfini – Don Fifì
- Umberto Spadaro – L'avvocato Faraglia
- Saro Arcidiacono - Il cancelliere
- Ignazio Balsamo – Francesco Messana
- Nanda De Santis – Lorenzina La Scaniota
- Bernardo Indelicato: Paolino
- Nadia Niver – Bastianedda
- Aldo Sguazzini
- Alfio Macrì – Il sindaco Leopoldo Pappalardo
- Carmelo Olivero – Don Peppino

== Awards ==
The film won 3 Nastro d'Argento: Best Actor (Massimo Girotti), Best Supporting Actor (Saro Urzì) and a special award for Pietro Germi.
