= Emma Baron =

Italian actress (1904–1986)

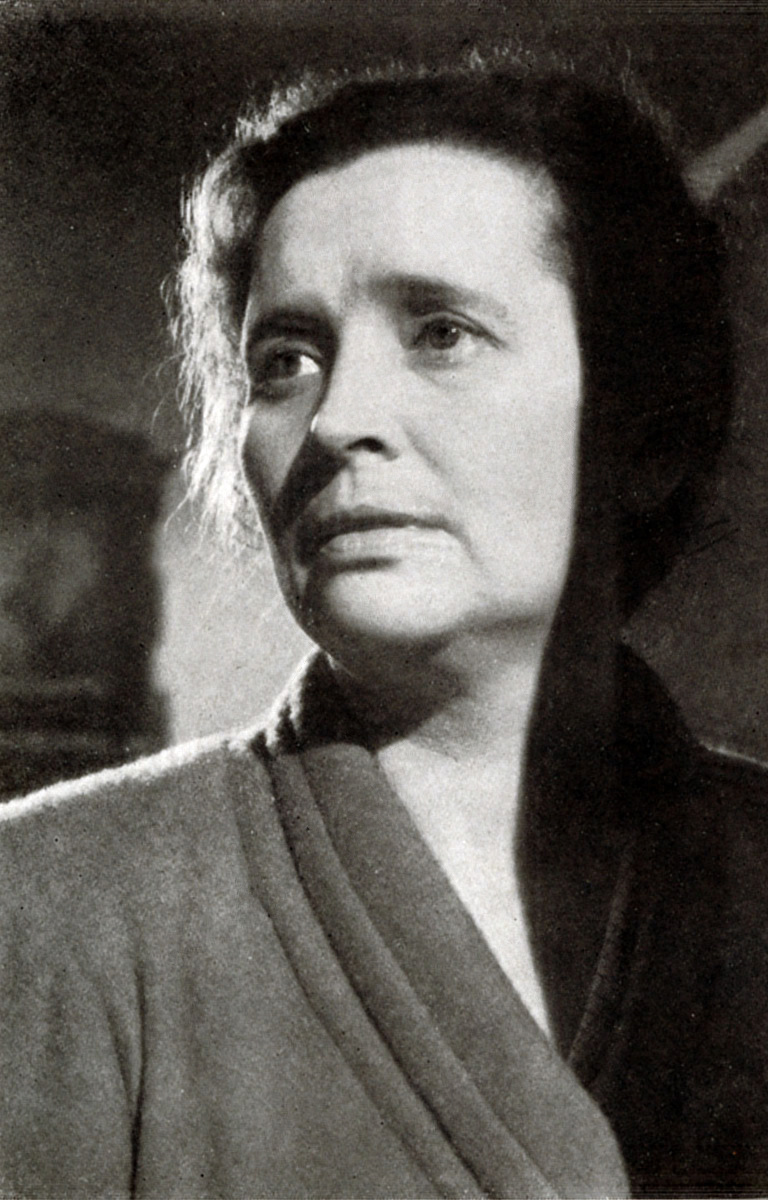
- Born: 19 October 1904; Treviso, Kingdom of Italy
- Died: 7 March 1986 (aged 81); Rome, Italy
- Occupation: Actress
- Years active: 1935–1986
- Spouse: Ennio Cerlesi (m. 1936; died 1951)

Emma Baron (19 October 1904 – 7 March 1986) was an Italian stage and film actress.

== Life and career ==
Born Emma Bardon in Treviso, after getting an arts degree she began her career on stage in the 1920s, entering the theatrical companies of Maria Melato and Marta Abba. Baron made her film debut in 1935, playing a leading role in Freccia d'oro; in this film she knew the actor Ennio Cerlesi, who one year later became her husband as well as a frequent partner on stage. Starting from the 1940s, Baron started an intense film career as a character actress, specializing in roles of mothers.

== Partial filmography ==
Baron appeared in the following films:

- 1935: Golden Arrow (C. D'Errico and P. Ballerini) - Contessa Sonia Larman
- 1936: Un bacio a fior d'acqua (G. Guarino) - Wally
- 1936: The Anonymous Roylott (R. Matarazzo)
- 1938: Il suo destino (E. Guazzoni) - La moglie di Andrea
- 1941: The Betrothed (M. Camerini) - La madre di Cecilia (uncredited)
- 1942: Love Story (M. Camerini) - L'infermiera della clinica
- 1942: Wedding Day (R. Matarazzo)
- 1948: Lost Youth (P. Germi) - La signora Manfredi (uncredited)
- 1950: The Accusation (G. Gentilomo) - Signora Pacetti
- 1950: Devotion (A. Genina) - Donna Francesca
- 1951: Miracles Only Happen Once (Y. Allégret) - La patronne de l'hôtel
- 1951: Four Ways Out (P. Germi) - La madre di Alberto
- 1951: The Ungrateful Heart (G. Brignone)
- 1951: The Last Sentence (M. Bonnard) - Madre di Piero
- 1951: Quo vadis (M. LeRoy)
- 1952: Viva il cinema! (G. Baldaccini and E. Trapani)
- 1952: Red Shirts (G. Alessandrini) - La signora Guiccioli
- 1952: Falsehood (U.M. Del Colle) - Maddalena
- 1952: Don Lorenzo (C.L. Bragaglia)
- 1952: One Hundred Little Mothers (G. Morelli)
- 1953: Perdonami! (M. Costa) - Marisa
- 1953: Legione straniera (B. Franchina) - Madre superiora
- 1953: The Story of William Tell (J. Cardiff) - Max's wife
- 1953: Cavallina storna (G. Morelli) - Caterina Pascoli moglie di Ruggero
- 1954: Disonorata senza colpa (G.W. Chili) - Suor Maria
- 1954: Avanzi di galera (V. Cottafavi)
- 1954: The Shadow (G. Bianchi) - Luisa
- 1954: Modern Virgin (M. Pagliero)
- 1954: Canzone d'amore (G.C. Simonelli)
- 1955: Le signorine dello 04 (G. Franciolini) - Head of Switchboard Operators (uncredited)
- 1955: Bella, non piangere! (D. Carbonari) - Madre di Enrico
- 1955: The Lost City (M. Alexandre and R.M. Torrecilla) - Madre de Rafael
- 1955: Disowned (G.W. Chili)
- 1955: The Song of the Heart (C. Campogalliani)
- 1955: Giuramento d'amore (R. Bianchi Montero) - La madre di Paolo
- 1955: Io piaccio (G. Bianchi) - Doriana Paris' Assistant (uncredited)
- 1955: I quattro del getto tonante (F. Cerchio) - Madre di Montanari
- 1955: Un palco all'opera (S. Marcellini)
- 1955: Desperate Farewell (L. De Felice) - Maurizio Mancini's Mother (uncredited)
- 1956: The Awakening (M. Camerini) - Una monaca all'aeroporto (uncredited)
- 1956: The Violent Patriot (S. Grieco) - madre di Emma
- 1956: Una voce, una chitarra e un po' di luna (G. Gentilomo) - Signora Romoli
- 1956: Te sto aspettanno (A. Fizzarotti)
- 1956: Difendo il mio amore (G. Macchi)
- 1957: Operazione notte (G. Bennati)
- 1957: Fathers and Sons (M. Monicelli) - Missis Bacci
- 1957: Saranno uomini (S. Siano)
- 1957: La canzone del destino (M. Girolami)
- 1957: Malafemmena (A. Fizzarotti)
- 1958: Anna of Brooklyn (C. Lastricati and R. Denbam)
- 1958: Un amore senza fine (L. Knaut and M. Terribile)
- 1958: The Sky Burns (G. Masini)
- 1958: Slave Women of Corinth (M. Bonnard) - Onoria
- 1958: Il bacio del sole / Don Vesuvio (S. Marcellini) - La madre di Vincenzo
- 1958: Love and Troubles (A. Dorigo) - Signora Renata
- 1959: First Love (M. Camerini) - Maria Lojacono
- 1959: Ben-Hur - Jewish Woman (uncredited)
- 1960: David and Goliath (R. Pottier and F. Baldi) - Anna - mother of David
- 1960: Minotaur, the Wild Beast of Crete (S. Amadio) - Madre - Addottiva di Arianna
- 1960: Two Women (V. De Sica) - Maria
- 1960: La garçonnière (G. De Santis)
- 1961: The Lovemakers (M. Bolognini) - Giovanna
- 1961: The Prisoner of the Iron Mask (F. De Feo)
- 1961: Goliath and the Vampires (G. Gentilomo and S. Corbucci) - Maciste's mother
- 1961: Barabbas (R. Fleischer) - Maria (uncredited)
- 1962: Ten Italians for One German (F.W. Ratti) - Mariella's Mother
- 1962: Pontius Pilate (G.P. Callegari and I. Rapper) - Dirce
- 1962: Disorder (F. Brusati) - Mario's old mother
- 1962: Duel of Fire (U. Lenzi)
- 1962: Le due leggi (E. Mulargia)
- 1963: Mafia alla sbarra (O. Palella)
- 1963: Gli invincibili sette (A. De Martino) - Mother
- 1964: The Thursday (D. Risi) - Giulia Versini
- 1964: Dark Purpose (G. Marshall and V. Sala) - Gregoria
- 1964: Amore mio (R. Matarazzo) - Ottavia
- 1965: The Agony and the Ecstasy (C. Reed)
- 1966: Arizona Colt (M. Lupo)
- 1968: A Long Ride from Hell (A. Burts (C. Bazzoni)) - Mrs. Sturges
- 1969: Shoot Twice (N. Cicero) - Mrs. Barret
- 1970: Angeli senza paradiso (E.M. Fizzarotti) - Mother of Marta
- 1971: Nights and Loves of Don Juan (A. Bradley [A. Brescia]) - Madre superiore (uncredited) (final film role)
