= A Minute to Pray, a Second to Die (film) =

1968 film

- Italian film poster
- Directed by: Franco Giraldi
- Screenplay by: Ugo Liberatore; Louis Garfinkle
- Story by: Albert Band; Ugo Liberatore
- Produced by: Albert Band; Gianni Hecht Lucari
- Starring: Alex Cord; Arthur Kennedy; Nicoletta Machiavelli; Robert Ryan
- Cinematography: Aiace Parolin
- Edited by: Alberto Gallitti
- Music by: Carlo Rustichelli
- Production companies: Documento Film; Selmur Pictures
- Distributed by: Columbia C.E.I.A.D. (Italy); Cinerama Releasing Corporation (US)
- Release date: May 22, 1968 (New York City)
- Running time: 118 minutes (Italy); 103 minutes (US)
- Countries: Italy; United States
- Languages: English, Italian
- Budget: $280,000
- Box office: $885,000 (US)

A Minute to Pray, a Second to Die (Italian: Un minuto per pregare, un istante per morire) is a 1968 Italian Spaghetti Western. It is the fourth and last western directed by Franco Giraldi. It was originally intended as being directed by Sergio Corbucci and the cast was to include also Raffaella Carrà and Renzo Palmer. The American version of the film was heavily cut, with a runtime 16 minutes shorter than the original version and featuring a different ending.

== Plot ==
Clay McCord is a wanted criminal. He frequently suffers with fits which hinder him to defend himself. His condition seems to deteriorate continuously. Seeking shelter he enters the lawless town Escondido although it is currently under siege by a high-ranked law enforcement officer. There he gets to know the young Laurinda and finds a doctor who discovers the reason for his fits. Unlike he feared he's not epileptic and can be cured for good. Yet he's still an outlaw and that is in the end his downfall.

== Cast ==
- Alex Cord as Clay McCord
- Arthur Kennedy as Tuscosa Marshal Roy W. Colby
- Robert Ryan as New Mexico Gov. Lem Carter
- Nicoletta Machiavelli as Laurinda
- Mario Brega as Krant
- Enzo Fiermonte as Dr. Chase
- Giampiero Albertini as Fred Duskin
- Renato Romano as 'Cheap' Charlie
- Franco Lantieri as Deputy Marshal Butler
- John Bartha as Cittadino
- José Canalejas as Seminole - bounty hunter
- Daniel Martín as Father Santana
- Antonio Molino Rojo as Sein
- Lorenzo Robledo as bounty hunter
- Aldo Sambrell as Jesús María
- Antonio Vico as Jonas

== Release ==
A Minute to Pray, a Second to Die was released in 1968. According to ABC records, the movie made a loss of $165,000. The film has also been released as Dead or Alive, Outlaw Gun, and Escondido. The film's title was A Minute to Pray, a Second to Die on its distribution in Canada and the United States, while foreign prints, released by Columbia Pictures, extended the film's runtime and featured a different ending. The film was released on VHS and Betamax in 1988; it is the only release on the Playhouse Video label to be rated R by the MPAA.

== Reception ==
In a contemporary review, "Murf." of Variety stated that like other Italian Westerns, "brutality is laid on with a trowel, but herein with at least a modicum of taste and plot motivation." A review in the Monthly Film Bulletin noted that "there are moments in this rather rambling Western which suggest that, given a more coherent script, Franco Giraldi might at least emerge as a front runner in the Italian imitation stakes" noting an "imaginatively directed gun battle set in a church" in the beginning of the film.

== See also ==
- List of Italian films of 1968
