= The Lovemakers (film) =

1961 film

- Poster
- Directed by: Mauro Bolognini
- Written by: Mario Pratesi; Vasco Pratolini
- Produced by: Alfredo Bini
- Starring: Claudia Cardinale; Jean-Paul Belmondo
- Cinematography: Leonida Barboni
- Edited by: Nino Baragli
- Music by: Piero Piccioni
- Distributed by: Titanus; Arco Film; Galatea Film
- Release date: 13 June 1961 (France)
- Country: Italy
- Language: Italian
- Box office: 698,077 admissions (France)

The Lovemakers (Italian: La viaccia) is a 1961 Italian drama film directed by Mauro Bolognini based on a novel by Mario Pratesi. The film which stars Claudia Cardinale and Jean-Paul Belmondo, was entered into the 1961 Cannes Film Festival.

== Plot ==
The original Italian La viaccia is the name of the family farm which motivates the plot. The death of a wealthy patriarch in 1885 sets off an interfamily power struggle. Son Ferdinando buys out his other relatives in order to gain full control over the dead man's property. But Ferdinando's country-bumpkin nephew Amerigo holds out. Amerigo's stance is weakened when he heads for the city and meets prostitute Bianca. To support her in the manner in which she is accustomed, Amerigo steals from his uncle. Disgraced in the eyes of his family, Amerigo decides to stay near his beloved Bianca by becoming a bouncer in her brothel.

== Cast ==
- Jean-Paul Belmondo as Amerigo
- Claudia Cardinale as Bianca
- Pietro Germi as Stefano
- Gabriella Pallotta as Carmelinda
- Romolo Valli as Dante
- Paul Frankeur as Ferdinando
- Gina Sammarco as Maîtresse
- Marcella Valeri as Beppa
- Emma Baron as Giovanna
- Franco Balducci as Tognaccio
- Claudio Biava as Arlecchino
- Nando Angelini as young man
- Duilio D'Amore as Bernardo
- Giuseppe Tosi as Casamonti
- Paola Pitagora as Anna
- Gianna Giachetti as boarder at brothel
- Rosita di Vera Cruz as Margherita
- Dante Posani as Gustavo
- Olimpia Cavalli as boarder
- Aurelio Nardi as ball-man
- Maurice Poli as uncle Cesare
- Renzo Palmer
- Rina Morelli
