= Millions (1991 film) =

- Italian: Miliardi
- Directed by: Carlo Vanzina
- Written by: Carlo Vanzina; Enrico Vanzina
- Story by: Renzo Barbieri
- Produced by: Mario Cecchi Gori; Vittorio Cecchi Gori
- Starring: Carol Alt; Billy Zane; Lauren Hutton
- Cinematography: Luigi Kuveiller
- Edited by: Ruggero Mastroianni
- Music by: Marco Colucci; Bruno Kassar; Pino S. Maria; Duilio Sorrenti
- Distributed by: Penta Film
- Release date: 1 February 1991
- Running time: 110 minutes 173 minutes (TV edit)
- Country: Italy

Millions (Italian: Miliardi, lit. 'Billions') is a 1991 Italian drama film directed by Carlo Vanzina.

== Cast ==
- Carol Alt as Betta
- Billy Zane as Maurizio Ferretti
- Lauren Hutton as Cristina Ferretti
- Jean Sorel as Leo Ferretti
- Alexandra Paul as Giulia Ferretti
- Roberto Bisacco as Osvaldo Ferretti
- Catherine Hickland as Connie
- John Stockwell as David Phipps
- Florinda Bolkan as Margherita
- Donald Pleasence as Ripa
- Ben Hammer as Cristina's father
- Michael Lombard as Tony Steiner
- Cyrus Elias as Piero Costa
- Mark Gellard as Alberto Ferretti
- John Armstead as Lamberto Razza
