= The Shameless Sex =

1952 Italian melodrama film

- Directed by: Duilio Coletti
- Written by: Aldo De Benedetti
- Starring: Yvonne Sanson; Franck Villard
- Cinematography: Carlo Montuori
- Music by: Alessandro Cicognini
- Release date: 17 August 1952
- Running time: 97 minutes
- Country: Italy
- Language: Italian

The Shameless Sex (Italian: Wanda la peccatrice, also known as Wanda the Sinner) is a 1952 Italian melodrama film directed by Duilio Coletti.

== Plot ==
Stefano, a naval officer for some time not operating on ships following a removal and therefore seconded to a Ministry, is warned that his wife Elena secretly transmits military designs and projects that he guarded to foreign powers. The wife is warned by an accomplice and prepares to leave: she greets her son in tears and begins to pack the bags.

But the officer runs back: the woman locks herself inside the room and shoots herself two shots, killing herself. In order not to suffer painful repercussions, the truth about the fate of the mother is not revealed to the little child and the father, forced to remain silent in order not to reveal his intimate secrets, cannot reveal the true causes of the suicide; he is accused of uxoricide but, through the oratory ability of his lawyer, he is acquitted at the following trial for lack of evidence. But this acquittal, instead of benefiting him, disfavors him: his relatives turn against him, preventing him from seeing his son, and the Ministry of the Navy requires him to resign. He closed all possibilities of work in Italy, he went to South Africa, but there the war broke out and was closed in a concentration camp. Tired, emaciated and with worn clothes, he returns to Italy penniless and with an illness in progress. His son, now grown, was previously stirred up by his grandmother and sees him as responsible for his mother's death.

One evening he meets a prostitute, Wanda, who lends him money: the officer, now on the verge of desperation, tries his luck at the game and fate hangs on his side: he wins a large sum and, having landed in the business field, carries out the right investments becoming very rich, enough to convince Wanda to live with him. The woman's decision, however, annoys Marco about her, her previous lover, who repeatedly tries to convince her that that relationship cannot have a future. The officer and Wanda thus still spend some time in this situation, until the illness and death of Nadina, an old friend of Wanda's, combined with the reappearance of her son about to embark on the paternal career for which we need the approval. of the parent's signature - does not unlock everything. The father tearfully greets his novice sailor son aboard the ship, now reconciled, while Wanda, in order not to get in the way of her career, is forced to leave that cohabitation.

== Cast ==
- Yvonne Sanson: Wanda
- Frank Villard: Stefano Lari
- Françoise Rosay: Anna Steiner
- Gino Leurini: Enrico Lari
- Camillo Pilotto: Lawyer Morelli
- Giulietta Masina: Nadina
- Paolo Stoppa: Marco
- Enrica Dyrell: Elena's sister
- Zora Piazza: Elena Meiner
- Malù Della Noce: Maria Luisa
- Michele Malaspina: Police commissioner
- Enzo Fiermonte: Consigliere di Elena
- Ada Colangeli: Doorwoman
