= Check to the Queen =

- Directed by: Pasquale Festa Campanile
- Written by: Tullio Pinelli; Brunello Rondi
- Cinematography: Roberto Gerardi
- Edited by: Mario Morra
- Music by: Piero Piccioni
- Release date: 1973
- Language: Italian

Scacco alla regina, internationally released as Check to the Queen, is a 1969 Italian comedy film directed by Pasquale Festa Campanile.

It is based on the novel The Slave by Renato Ghiotto.

== Plot ==
Margaret Mevin is an arrogant famous actress, accustomed to being served and revered by the people with whom she surrounds herself. Silvia comes to her service as a lady companion, but her submissive role soon acquires masochistic traits and homosexual shades.

== Cast ==
- Rosanna Schiaffino: Margaret Mevin
- Haydée Politoff: Silvia
- Romolo Valli: Enrico Valdam
- Aldo Giuffrè: Spartaco
- Daniela Surina: Dina
- Gabriele Tinti
