= Luisa Della Noce =

Italian actress (1923–2008)

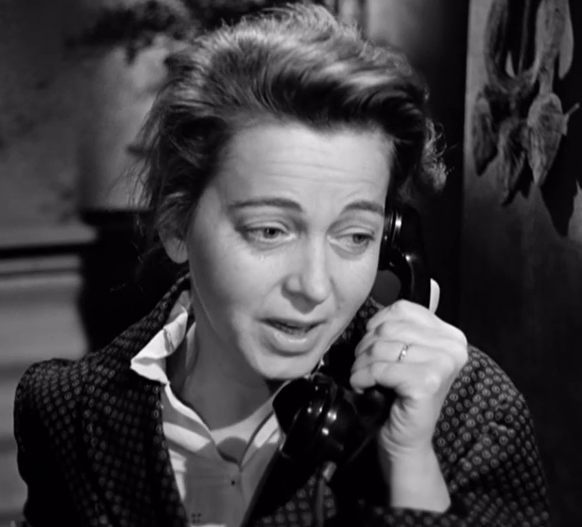
- Della Noce in The Railroad Man (1956)
- Born: Maria Luisa Della Noce; 28 April 1923; San Giorgio di Nogaro, Friuli-Venezia Giulia, Italy
- Died: 15 May 2008 (aged 85); Rome, Lazio, Italy
- Occupation: Actress
- Years active: 1951–1982

Maria Luisa Della Noce (28 April 1923 – 15 May 2008) was an Italian actress. She was perhaps best known for her roles in the films The Railroad Man (1956) and Juliet of the Spirits (1965).

== Filmography ==
Film
Year	Title	Role	Notes
1951	L'ultima sentenza		
1952	The Shameless Sex	Maria Luisa	
1955	The Art of Getting Along	Paola Toscano	
1956	The Railroad Man	Sara Marcocci	
1958	A Man of Straw	Luisa	
1959	Parque de Madrid	Carmen	
1963	Giacobbe, l'uomo che lottò con Dio	Lia - Leah	
1964	Oltraggio al pudore	Signora Pascutti	
1965	Juliet of the Spirits	Adele	
1967	Death Rides Along	Mother of Susan	
1967	John the Bastard	Sara	
1982	Identification of a Woman	Mavi's mother	(final film role)
