= Engaged to Death =

- Directed by: Romolo Marcellini
- Written by: Giuseppe De Santis; Nicolò Ferrari; Jacques Rémy; Franco Solinas
- Produced by: Giuseppe Driussi
- Starring: Rik Battaglia; Sylva Koscina; Margit Nünke; Hans Albers
- Cinematography: Aldo Giordani
- Edited by: Eraldo Da Roma
- Music by: Angelo Francesco Lavagnino
- Production company: Sirio Film
- Distributed by: CEI Incom
- Release date: 6 February 1957
- Running time: 93 minutes
- Country: Italy
- Language: Italian

Engaged to Death (Italian: I fidanzati della morte) is a 1957 Italian sports drama film directed by Romolo Marcellini and starring Rik Battaglia, Sylva Koscina and Margit Nünke. The veteran German star Hans Albers appears in a supporting role. The film portrays the lives of top motorcycle racing competitors.

The film's sets were designed by the art director Carlo Egidi. It was shot in Eastmancolor.

== Cast ==
- Rik Battaglia as Carlo
- Sylva Koscina as Lucia
- Margit Nünke as Giovanna
- Gustavo Rojo as Pietro
- Hans Albers as Lorenzo
- Carlo Ninchi as Parisi
- Saro Urzì as Tulio
- Anna Maini
- Marida Vanni
- Giovanni Piva
- Marco Guglielmi
- Edoardo Toniolo
- Piero Pastore
- Giorgio Pucci
- Valeria Fabrizi
- Renato Navarrini
- Spartaco Ricci
- Geoffrey Duke as Biker
- Libero Liberati as Biker
- Bill Lomas as Biker
- Enrico Lorenzetti as Biker
- Pierre Monneret as Biker
- Alessandro Tedeschi as Tour Eiffel Tourist
- Maria Tedeschi as Tour Eiffel Tourist

== Bibliography ==
- Gianni Rondolino. Dizionario del cinema italiano 1945-1969. G. Einaudi, 1969.
