= Seduced and Abandoned (1964 film) =

- Directed by: Pietro Germi
- Written by: Pietro Germi; Agenore Incrocci; Furio Scarpelli; Luciano Vincenzoni
- Produced by: Franco Cristaldi; Luigi Giacosi
- Starring: Stefania Sandrelli; Saro Urzì; Aldo Puglisi; Lando Buzzanca; Leopoldo Trieste; Umberto Spadaro; Rocco D'Assunta; Lola Braccini
- Cinematography: Aiace Parolin
- Edited by: Roberto Cinquini
- Music by: Carlo Rustichelli
- Distributed by: Continental Distributing Inc.
- Release date: 15 July 1964 (United States)
- Running time: 115 minutes
- Countries: Italy; France
- Language: Italian

Seduced and Abandoned (Italian: Sedotta e abbandonata) is a 1964 Italian comedy-drama film directed by Pietro Germi. The film is a dark satire of Sicilian social custom of bride kidnapping presented as elopement, and the Italian laws of the time on honor killing and "honor-repairing wedding".
It belongs to a trilogy on Italian customs with Divorce, Italian Style and The Birds, the Bees and the Italians.

The film was screened at the 1964 Cannes Film Festival, where the lead actor Saro Urzì won a Palme d'Or. It also won a National Board of Review Award.

== Plot ==
Aldo Puglisi, Saro Urzì, Stefania Sandrelli and Lando Buzzanca

The film presents the tale of Agnese Ascalone, daughter of prominent quarry owner Vincenzo Ascalone, and takes place in a small town in Sicily (specifically Sciacca), as did Germi's previous film, Divorce, Italian Style. Agnese, who is 15, is "seduced" by her sister Matilde's fiancé, and has a tryst with him for which she confesses and tries to repent, only to be discovered by her mother and father when she shows symptoms of pregnancy. Vincenzo immediately demands that the man, Peppino Califano, marry his daughter. Peppino decides he does not want to marry her, as she is no longer a virgin. Vincenzo, incensed by this, plots to murder him and attempts to induce his son Antonio do so. Agnese becomes aware of the plot and escapes her home (in which her family is locking her in) to report it to the police. The police arrest both parties and both men deny anything happened. The prosecutor ultimately decides to charge Peppino with statutory rape, since she was under the age of consent which was 16. Both sets of parents pressure Agnese to marry him as there is an exception to statutory rape laws if the parties had eloped. Vincenzo forces Peppino to stage a fake kidnapping of Agnese and then marry her. Everyone appears before the magistrate to inform him of the happy ending to the story. But things do not go as planned: when the magistrate asks Agnese for confirmation, the girl bursts into tears and the magistrate deduces that she is being forced into marriage. As the Ascalones return home from the magistrate's court, the villagers mock them vehemently. This is too much for Vincenzo, who suffers a heart attack. Confined to bed, he manages to convince Agnese to marry Peppino, then dies in secret, sacrificing his life on the altar of honour so as not to delay the wedding. Matilde takes her vows to become a nun.

== Cast ==
- Stefania Sandrelli - Agnese Ascalone
- Saro Urzì - Don Vincenzo Ascalone
- Aldo Puglisi - Peppino Califano
- Lando Buzzanca - Antonio Ascalone
- Lola Braccini - Amalia Califano
- Leopoldo Trieste - Baron Rizieri Zappalà
- Umberto Spadaro - Cousin Ascalone, a lawyer
- Paola Biggio - Matilde Ascalone
- Rocco D'Assunta - Orlando Califano
- Oreste Palella - Police Chief Polenza
- Lina Lagalla - Francesca Ascalone
- Gustavo D'Arpe - Ciarpetta the Lawyer
- Rosetta Urzì - Consolata the Maid
- Roberta Narbonne - Rosaura Ascalone
- Vincenzo Licata - Pasquale Profumo the Undertaker
- Attilio Martella - The Magistrate Judge
- Adelino Campardo - Police Officer Bisigato
- Salvatore Fazio - Don Mariano the Priest
- Italia Spadaro - Aunt Carmela

== Reception ==
The film was critically acclaimed.

=== Cannes Film Festival ===
- Saro Urzì Palme d'or - Best Actor
- Pietro Germi Best Director Candidature

=== National Board of Review, USA ===
- NBR Award Top Foreign Films

=== New York Film Critics Circle Awards ===
- Candidature NYFCC Award Best Foreign Language Film

=== David di Donatello Awards ===
- Franco Cristaldi Best Production
- Pietro Germi

Best Director

=== Italian National Syndicate of Film Journalists ===
- Saro Urzì Silver Ribbon - Best Actor
- Leopoldo Trieste Silver Ribbon

- Best Supporting Actor

- Pietro Germi, Luciano Vincenzoni, Agenore Incrocci, Furio Scarpelli, Silver Ribbon - Best Screenplay
- Carlo Egidi, Franco Cristaldi Silver Ribbon -

Best Producer

- Pietro Germi Candidature to Silver Ribbon - Best Director
- Pietro Germi Candidature to Silver Ribbon - Best Original Story
- Pietro Germi, Luciano Vincenzoni Candidature to Silver Ribbon - Best Cinematography, B/W
- Aiace Parolin Candidature to Silver Ribbon - Best Costume Design

=== Avellino Neorealism Film Festival ===
- Saro Urzì Laceno d'Oro - Best Actor
