= Paolo Rustichelli =

Italian-American pianist, composer, and producer (born 1953)

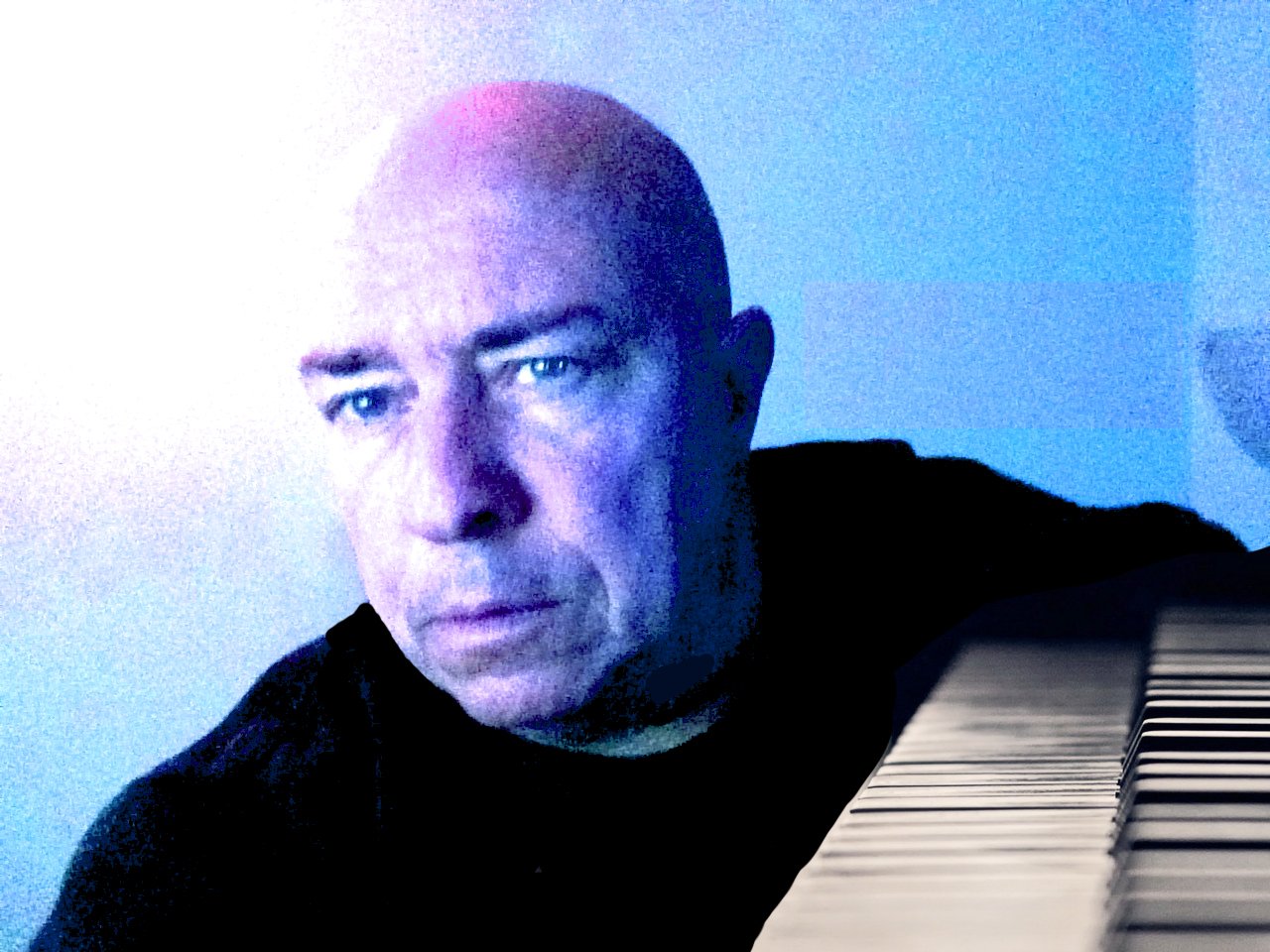

Background information
- Born: 1953 (age 72–73); Rome, Italy
- Genres: Smooth jazz, jazz rock, progressive rock
- Occupations: Musician, composer
- Instruments: Piano, keyboards
- Years active: 1970s–present
- Website: www.paolo.org

Paolo Rustichelli is an Italian-American pianist, composer, and producer, and the son of Oscar nominee Carlo Rustichelli. His music is eclectic but generally belongs in the genres smooth jazz, jazz rock, and progressive rock.

== Career ==
Pioneering the use of the monophonic synthesizers like the ARP 2600 and Minimoog, Hammond Novachord, Hammond C3 organ, and the Mellotron, Paolo Rustichelli composed and produced various movie soundtracks and a progressive rock album, Opera Prima (RCA 1973). Among many scores, made completely with synths, are included Top Box Office European movies like Amici Miei atto III and Testa o Croce.

His jazz-rock album Mystic Man (1996) featured Miles Davis, Carlos Santana, Herbie Hancock, Wayne Shorter, Andy Summers, and Jill Jones. The song "Paisa" reached the Top Ten on the Radio & Records Smooth Jazz/NAC charts.

The song "Full Moon" from Mystic Jazz was composed for Carlos Santana. Tenor Plácido Domingo sang Paolo Rustichelli's "Kyrie" on his album Sacred Songs (2002). The song "My Geisha" from the album Neopagan reached the top ten on the Radio and Records Smooth Jazz/NAC charts of 2006 and 2007.

"Med Groove" from the album Soul Italiano reached No. 1 in smoothjazz.com chart and was an Amazon.com Smooth Jazz Best seller at no. 1 for several weeks in January and February 2014.

Paolo's new single 'Hypnofunk' (2019) it's a musical celebration of the psychedelic era with a touch of hip hop rhythm. Paolo is currently working on his Album "Tempus Fugit" which is scheduled to be released in March 2020.

== Partial discography ==
- Opera Prima (RCA Italy, 1973)
- Mystic Jazz (PolyGram, 1991)
- Mystic Man (Island, 1996)
- Neopagan (Next Age, 2006)
- Soul Italiano (Next Age, 2016)
