= Shoot Loud, Louder... I Don't Understand =

1966 film

- Theatrical release poster
- Directed by: Eduardo De Filippo
- Written by: Suso Cecchi d'Amico; Eduardo De Filippo
- Produced by: Pietro Notarianni; Joseph E. Levine
- Starring: Marcello Mastroianni; Raquel Welch
- Cinematography: Danilo Desideri; Aiace Parolin
- Edited by: Ruggero Mastroianni
- Music by: Nino Rota
- Production company: Master Film
- Distributed by: Embassy Pictures
- Release date: December 1966
- Running time: 100 minutes
- Country: Italy
- Language: Italian
- Budget: $2 million

Shoot Loud, Louder... I Don't Understand (Italian: Spara forte, più forte, non capisco) is a 1966 Italian crime film directed by Eduardo De Filippo, who adapted the script from his play Le voci di dentro.

== Plot ==
Alberto is a sculptor who sometimes has trouble separating his fantasies from reality. He shares a home in Naples with his Uncle Nicola. One night after meeting the beautiful Tania, he dreams that his neighbour, Amitrano, has been murdered by his family. He reports it to the police. Later he tells the police that he may have just imagined it but the police refuse to believe him, knowing that Amitrano was a gangster, and arrest him. Then Amitrano appears and demands Alberto's passport so he can escape to South America. Eventually Alberto and Tania flee from Naples.

== Cast ==
- Marcello Mastroianni - Alberto Saporito
- Raquel Welch - Tania Montini
- Guido Alberti - Pasquale Cimmaruta
- Leopoldo Trieste - Carlo Saporito
- Tecla Scarano - Zia Rosa Cimmaruta
- Eduardo De Filippo - Zi Nicola
- Rosalba Grottesi - Elvira Cimmaruta
- Paolo Ricci - Aniello Amitrano
- Regina Bianchi - Rosa Amitrano (as Régina Bianchi)
- Franco Parenti - Chief Police Inspector
- Angela Luce - Beautiful Woman
- Silvano Tranquilli - Lt. Bertolucci
- Pina D'Amato - Matilde Cimmaruta
- Carlo Bagno - Marshal Bagnacavallo
- Pia Morra - Maid
- Gino Minopoli - Luigi Cimmaruta
- Alberto Bugli - Deputy Police Inspector
- Ignazio Spalla - Carmelo Vitiello

== Production ==
The film was the first in a three-picture deal between Joe E. Levine and Marcello Mastroianni. Levine called the star "the most sought after personality today" and said he would earn "a lot more money than he's ever earned before." Levine said the title of the new movie "was thought up... on the spot... This is an age of titles," said Levine of the film's title.

Levine reportedly provided $1,350,000 of the budget. Welch's fee was $65,000 and Mastroianni got $600,000.

It was shot on location in Naples and at Rome's Cinecitta Studios in September 1966. It was one of the first notable roles for Raquel Welch, who at that stage was best known for her photographs in magazines than her acting. "Raquel has turned out to be very good, especially for comedy," said Mastroianni. "And comedy is much more difficult than drama."

== Reception ==
The Los Angeles Times said the film was "as appetizing as a piece of stale pre-fab pizza... lengthy and boring... never were so many fireworks set off in such a dud of a movie.". The Chicago Tribune called it a "tedious and terrible mess... a disastrous dud."
