= Tullio Pinelli =

Italian screenwriter (1908–2009)

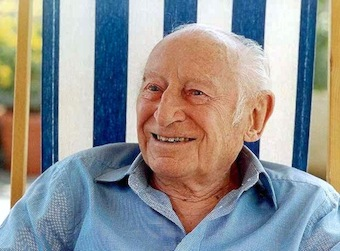
- Tullio Pinelli by Damian Pettigrew (2002)
- Born: 24 June 1908; Turin, Piedmont, Kingdom of Italy
- Died: 7 March 2009 (aged 100); Rome, Lazio, Italy
- Occupations: Playwright; screenwriter
- Spouse: Madeleine Lebeau (m. 1988)

Tullio Pinelli (24 June 1908 – 7 March 2009) was an Italian screenwriter known for his work on the Federico Fellini films I Vitelloni, La Strada, La Dolce Vita and 8½.

== Biography ==
Born in Turin, Pinelli began his career as a civil lawyer but spent his free time working in the theatre as a playwright. He was descended from a long line of Italian patriots; his great-uncle General Ferdinando Pinelli quashed the bandit revolt in Calabria following Italian unification.

He met Fellini in a Rome kiosk in 1946 while they were reading opposite pages of the same newspaper. "Meeting each other", explained Pinelli, "was a creative lightning bolt. We spoke the same language from the start... We were fantasizing about a screenplay that would be the exact opposite of what was fashionable then: the story of a very shy and modest office worker who discovered he can fly; so he flaps his arms and escapes out the window. It certainly wasn't Italian neorealism. But the idea never went anywhere either." The anecdote about flying presages the opening scene of 8½ (1963) in which the protagonist, a prominent film director, who dreams of escape by flying out of his car caught in a traffic jam.

Pinelli died at the age of 100 on 7 March 2009 in Rome. He was married (from 1988) to the French-born actress Madeleine Lebeau, who had roles in 8½ and Casablanca (1942).

== Selected filmography ==
- His Young Wife (1945)
- The Adulteress (1946)
- The Bandit (1946)
- Bullet for Stefano (1947)
- The Opium Den (1947)
- L'amore (1948)
- Without Pity (1948)
- The Earth Cries Out (1948)
- In the Name of the Law (1949)
- The Mill on the Po (1949)
- Path of Hope (1950)
- Variety Lights (1950)
- Four Ways Out (1951)
- Cameriera bella presenza offresi... (1951)
- The Bandit of Tacca Del Lupo (1952)
- The White Sheik (1952)
- Pietà per chi cade (1953)
- I Vitelloni (1953)
- Love in the City (1953)
- Symphony of Love (1954)
- The Lovers of Manon Lescaut (1954)
- La Strada (1954)
- Il bidone (1955)
- The Wolves (1956)
- Nights of Cabiria (1957)
- Fortunella, (1958)
- Herod the Great (1958)
- La Dolce Vita (1960)
- Adua and Her Friends (1960)
- Boccaccio '70 (1962)
- Careless (1962)
- The Steppe (1962)
- 8½ (1963)
- The Three Faces (1965)
- The Gaucho (1965)
- Juliet of the Spirits (1965)
- Francesco di Assisi (1966)
- The Climax (1967)
- Check to the Queen (1969)
- Galileo (1969)
- Sweet Charity (1969)
- Serafino (1969)
- How, When and with Whom (1969)
- Help Me, My Love (1969)
- A Pocketful of Chestnuts (1970)
- The Garden of the Finzi-Continis (1970)
- Alfredo Alfredo (1972)
- Amore e ginnastica (1973)
- My Friends (1975)
- Down the Ancient Staircase (1975)
- Lovers and Liars (1979)
- Il Marchese del Grillo (1981)
- All My Friends Part 2 (1982)
- Amici miei - Atto III (1985)
- Ginger and Fred (1986)
- Let's Hope It's a Girl (1986)
- Mano rubata (1989)
- The Voice of the Moon (1990)

== Bibliography ==
- Pinelli, Tullio (2008). L'uomo a cavallo. Roma: Edizioni Sabinae.
