= The Counterfeiters (1951 film) =

1951 film

- Directed by: Franco Rossi
- Written by: Edoardo Anton; Ugo Guerra; Leopoldo Trieste; Franco Rossi; Franco Rossi
- Produced by: Nazareno Gallo
- Starring: Fosco Giachetti; Doris Duranti; Erno Crisa
- Cinematography: Domenico Scala
- Edited by: Mario Serandrei
- Music by: Carlo Rustichelli
- Production company: Gallo Film
- Distributed by: Metro-Goldwyn-Mayer
- Release date: 21 September 1951
- Running time: 90 minutes
- Country: Italy
- Language: Italian

The Counterfeiters (Italian: I falsari) is a 1951 Italian crime film directed by Franco Rossi and starring Fosco Giachetti, Doris Duranti and Erno Crisa. It marked the directorial debut of Rossi. The film's sets and costumes were designed by the art director Gaia Romanini. It was distributed by the Italian subsidiary of Metro-Goldwyn-Mayer.

== Plot ==
Police inspector Moroni pretends to be a traveling salesman to unmask a gang of counterfeiters. Thus begins his investigations, which together with an anonymous letter lead him to investigate in the city of Naples.

== Cast ==
- Fosco Giachetti as Moroni
- Doris Duranti as Teresa
- Erno Crisa as Pietro
- Lianella Carell as Lucia
- Saro Urzì as Commissioner
- Mario Angelotti as Nicola
- Gabriele Ferzetti as Dario
- Nerio Bernardi as Maggiori
- Attilio Dottesio as Carlo Farina
- Agostino Salvietti as Il venditore di libri usati
- Mario Terribile as Prospero Marias
- Ida Bracci Dorati as Maria Cinelli
- Leopoldo Trieste as Il brigadiere Caputo
- Michele Malaspina as L'sspettore della finanza
- Roberto Murolo as Singer

== Bibliography ==
- Chiti, Roberto & Poppi, Roberto. Dizionario del cinema italiano: Dal 1945 al 1959. Gremese Editore, 1991.
