= Romolo Valli =

Italian actor

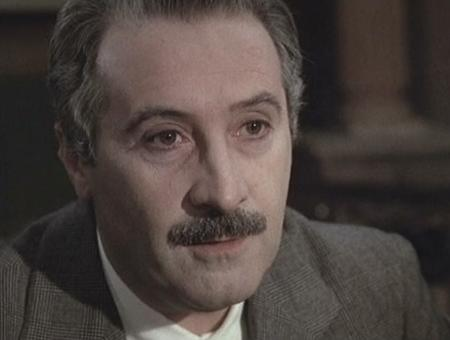
- Valli in The Garden of the Finzi-Continis (1970)
- Born: 7 February 1925; Reggio Emilia, Italy
- Died: 1 February 1980 (aged 54); Rome, Italy
- Occupation: Actor
- Years active: 1954–1979

Romolo Valli (7 February 1925 – 1 February 1980) was an Italian actor.

Valli was born in Reggio Emilia. He was one of the best-known Italian actors from the 1950s to his death. He worked for both the stage and the silver screen. Among the directors he collaborated with were Vittorio De Sica, Sergio Leone, Roman Polanski, Roger Vadim, and Luchino Visconti, who cast Valli in three feature films (The Leopard, Death in Venice, Conversation Piece) and the episode Il lavoro of Boccaccio '70. Valli died in a car accident, at age 54.

== Theatre ==
- Così è (se vi pare) (1974)

== Filmography ==
- Policarpo (1959) - Commendator Egidio Marzi Laurenzi
- The Great War (1959) - Tenente Gallina
- Five Branded Women (1960) - Mirko
- Call Girls of Rome (1960) - Il commissario
- Il carro armato dell'8 settembre (1960)
- Girl with a Suitcase (1961) - Don Pietro Introna
- The Lovemakers (1961) - Dante
- A Day for Lionhearts (1961) - Edoardo
- Boccaccio '70 (1962) - Lawyer Zacchi (segment "Il lavoro")
- Peccati d'estate (1962) - Carlino
- A Milanese Story (1962) - Mr. Gessner
- The Shortest Day (1962) - Il capitano
- The Leopard (1963) - Father Pirrone
- Sweet and Sour (1963) - Signor X
- Outlaws of Love (1963) - Francesco
- La vendetta della signora (1964) - Town Painter
- La costanza della ragione (1964) - (uncredited)
- A Man Named John (1965) - The Intermediary (voice)
- I complessi (1965) - Father Baldini (segment "Guglielmo il Dentone")
- The Mandrake (1965) - Messer Nicia
- Don't Sting the Mosquito (1967) - Bartolomeo Santangelo padre di Rita
- Il marito è mio e l'ammazzo quando mi pare (1968) - Butler
- Boom! (1968) - Dr. Luilo
- Barbarella (1968)
- Check to the Queen (1969) - Enrico Valdman
- The Garden of the Finzi-Continis (1970) - Giorgio's Father
- Death in Venice (1971) - Hotel Manager
- Er Più – storia d'amore e di coltello (1971) - Il maresciallo
- Duck, You Sucker! (1971) - Dr. Villega
- Paulina 1880 (1972) - Farinata
- What? (1972) - Giovanni
- Silence the Witness (1974) - Il ministro
- Conversation Piece (1974) - Micheli
- Nipoti miei diletti (1974) - Trèves
- 1900 (1976) - Giovanni Berlinghieri
- An Average Little Man (1977) - Dr. Spazioni
- Un attimo, una vita (1977) - Uncle Luigi
- The Devil's Advocate (1977) - Cardinal Marotta
- Holocaust 2000 (1977) - Charrier
- Womanlight (1979) - Galba (final film role)
