= Carlo Bernari =

Italian author

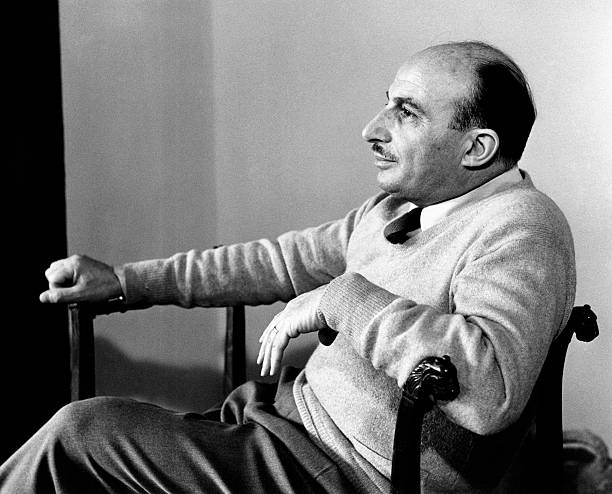

Carlo Bernari (13 October 1909 in Naples – 22 October 1992 in Rome) is the pseudonym under which Italian author Carlo Bernard is known.

== Life and career ==
He had no formal education after grade seven, when he was expelled, but read widely in philosophy and art. At an early point, he became interested in avant-garde art and experimentalism. He also became close to leftist intellectuals and artists His first novel, Tre Operai (Three Workers), concerned workers' issues in Naples. The book may have been a precursor to neo-realism and reportedly angered Benito Mussolini who felt there was Communism in it.

== Awards ==
In 1950, he shared the Viareggio Prize with Francesco Jovine. In 1962, he was nominated for an Academy Award for Best Original Screenplay for his work on the screenplay of The Four Days of Naples.

== Selected filmography ==
- The Two Sergeants (1936)
- The Climax (1967)
