= 1870 (film) =

1971 film

- Film Cover
- Directed by: Alfredo Giannetti
- Written by: Alfredo Giannetti
- Starring: Anna Magnani; Marcello Mastroianni
- Cinematography: Leonida Barboni
- Edited by: Renato Cinquini
- Music by: Ennio Morricone
- Release date: 1971
- Country: Italy
- Language: Italian

1870 (Italian: Correva l'anno di grazia 1870) is a 1971 Italian drama film directed by Alfredo Giannetti.

== Cast ==
- Anna Magnani
- Marcello Mastroianni
- Osvaldo Ruggeri
- Mario Carotenuto
- Franco Balducci
- Gastone Bartolucci
- Silla Bettini
- Duilio Cruciani
