= The Emperor of Capri =

- Theatrical release poster
- Directed by: Luigi Comencini
- Written by: Luigi Comencini; Gino De Santis; Marcello Marchesi; Vittorio Metz; Teresa Ricci Bartoloni
- Produced by: Carlo Ponti
- Starring: Totò; Yvonne Sanson; Marisa Merlini
- Cinematography: Giuseppe Caracciolo
- Edited by: Otello Colangeli
- Music by: Felice Montagnini
- Production company: Lux Film
- Distributed by: Lux Film
- Release date: 16 December 1949
- Running time: 90 minutes
- Country: Italy
- Language: Italian

The Emperor of Capri (Italian: L'imperatore di Capri) is a 1949 Italian comedy film directed by Luigi Comencini and starring Totò, Yvonne Sanson and Marisa Merlini.

The film's sets were designed by the art director Carlo Egidi.

== Cast ==
- Totò as Antonio De Fazio
- Yvonne Sanson as Sonia Bulgarov
- Marisa Merlini as La baronesa von Krapfen
- Laura Gore as Lucia
- Mario Castellani as Asdrubale Stinchi
- Pina Gallini as La suocera
- Nino Marchetti as Geremia
- Nerio Bernardi as Osvaldo
- Alda Mangini as Emanuela
- Piero Tordi as Il marito di Emanuela
- Galeazzo Benti as Dodo della Baggina
- Gianni Appelius as Bubi di Primaporta
- Aldo Giuffrè as Omar Bey Khan di Agapur
- Enrico Glori as Il maggiordomo
- Lino Robi as Basilio
- Toni Ucci as Pupetto Turacciolo

== Bibliography ==
- Moliterno, Gino. A to Z of Italian Cinema. Scarecrow Press, 2009.
