= Daniela Surina =

Italian singer, actress, and television personality

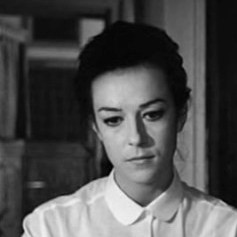
- Daniela Surina in China is Near (1967)
- Born: 20 September 1942 (age 83); Trieste
- Occupation: Actress

Daniela Surina (born 20 September 1942) is an Italian singer, actress and television personality.

== Life and career ==
Born in Trieste, Surina started her professional career in 1965, making her film debut in the comedy film Soldati e caporali. During her career she alternated genre films and more ambitious art films. For her performance in Marco Bellocchio's China is Near she was nominated to Nastro d'Argento for Best Supporting Actress and to Grolla d'oro.

== Partial filmography ==
- Soldati e caporali (1965) - Lidia
- Latin Lovers (1965) - (segment "Il telefono consolatore")
- Me, Me, Me... and the Others (1966)
- È mezzanotte... butta giù il cadavere (1966)
- Kill Me Quick, I'm Cold (1967) - Christina
- China is Near (1967) - Giovanna
- Death in the Red Jaguar (1968) - Ria Payne
- Erzählungen aus der neuen Welt (1968)
- Black Talisman (1969) - Sybille Burton
- Check to the Queen (1969) - Dina
- Heads or Tails (1969)
- My Uncle Benjamin (1969) - La marquise de Cambyse
- Lettera aperta a un giornale della sera (1970) - Countess Surina
- The Dead Are Alive (1972) - Irene
- Divorce His, Divorce Hers (1973) - Franca
