= The Facts of Murder =

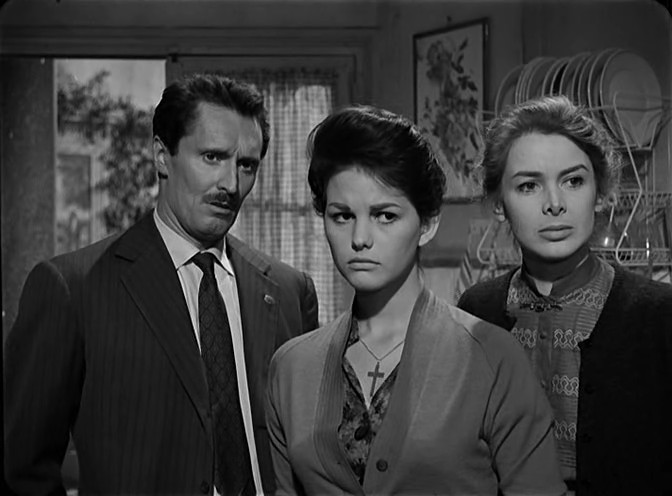
- Directed by: Pietro Germi
- Written by: Ennio De Concini
- Based on: That Awful Mess on Via Merulana by Carlo Emilio Gadda
- Produced by: Giuseppe Amato; Mario Silvestri
- Starring: Pietro Germi; Claudia Cardinale; Franco Fabrizi
- Cinematography: Leonida Barboni
- Edited by: Roberto Cinquini
- Music by: Carlo Rustichelli
- Color process: Black and white
- Production company: Riama Film
- Distributed by: Cineriz
- Release date: 11 November 1959
- Running time: 115 minutes
- Country: Italy
- Language: Italian

The Facts of Murder (Italian: Un maledetto imbroglio) is a 1959 Italian crime mystery film directed by and starring Pietro Germi with Claudia Cardinale. The film is based on the 1957 novel That Awful Mess on Via Merulana by Carlo Emilio Gadda. The sets were designed by the art director Carlo Egidi.

It was restored and re-released in 1999 both in Italy and the United States.

== Plot ==
A disguised bandit steals valuable jewellery from Commendatore Anzaloni’s apartment and flees, leaving him unharmed. Inspector Ingravallo investigates and finds that the robbery is suspicious in that the robber was able to find valuables too quickly. A neighbour, Liliana Banducci, employs a servant girl, Assuntina. Her fiancé, Diomede, tries to escape when he sees police tailing Assuntina. But Diomede has an alibi. Liliana's cousin, Dr. Valdarena, pays her a visit, only to find her corpse on the floor. But before calling police, Valdarena removes an envelope addressed to him from the sideboard. Liliana's husband Remo was away from Rome at the time of the murder, but he is very surprised to hear that Liliana had changed her will only one week earlier.

== Cast ==
- Pietro Germi as Inspector Ciccio Ingravallo
- Claudia Cardinale as Assuntina
- Franco Fabrizi as Valdarena
- Cristina Gajoni as Virginia
- Claudio Gora as Remo Banducci
- Eleonora Rossi Drago as Liliana Banducci
- Saro Urzì as Detective Saro
- Nino Castelnuovo as Diomede
- Ildebrando Santafe as Anzaloni
- Peppino De Martino as Dr. Fumi
- Silla Bettini as Oreste
- Rosolino Bua as parish priest
- Loretta Capitoli as Camilla
- Nanda De Santis as Zamira
- Attilio Martella as Marchetti
- Gianni Musy as Retalli
- Toni Ucci as Er Patata
- Vincenzo Tocci as Filone
- Pietro Tordi as Director Motel "Verbania"
- Antonio Acqua as General Pomilia
- Maria Saccenti as Mrs. Pomilia
- April Hennessy as American Girl
- Rina Mascetti as Cashier Banducci
- Antonio Gradoli as Marshal Mariano
- Grazia Spadaro as Old Woman

== Awards ==
- Mar de Plata Film Festival : Best Director
- Nastro d'Argento : Best Script, Best Supporting Actor (Claudio Gora ).

== Bibliography ==
- Moliterno, Gino. A to Z of Italian Cinema. Scarecrow Press, 2009.
