= La presidentessa (1977 film) =

- Directed by: Luciano Salce
- Written by: Maurice Hennequin (play La Présidente); Pierre Veber (play La Présidente)
- Produced by: Mario Cecchi Gori
- Cinematography: Ennio Guarnieri
- Edited by: Antonio Siciliano
- Music by: Lelio Luttazzi
- Distributed by: Variety Distribution
- Release date: 1977
- Language: Italian

La presidentessa (The Chairwoman) is a 1977 Italian comedy film directed by Luciano Salce.

It is based on the play Madame Presidente by Maurice Hennequin and Pierre Veber.

== Plot ==
When Yvette, a soubrette, is mistaken as the spouse of a judge, a Minister of Justice has falls in love with her and the two marry.

== Cast ==
- Mariangela Melato as Yvette Jolifleur
- Johnny Dorelli as Tony Beghin/Ottavio
- Vittorio Caprioli as Mazzone
- Gianrico Tedeschi as Judge Agostino Trecanti
- Luciano Salce as Bortignon
- Elsa Vazzoler as Egle Trecanti
- Marco Tulli as Salvatore
- Ugo Bologna as Notary Piovano
- Renzo Marignano as Scottish Tourist

== See also ==
- List of Italian films of 1977
- Madame la Presidente (1916)
- The President (1938)
- Mademoiselle Gobete (1952)
