= The Railroad Man =

1956 film

- Directed by: Pietro Germi
- Written by: Pietro Germi; Alfredo Giannetti; Luciano Vincenzoni
- Produced by: Carlo Ponti
- Starring: Pietro Germi; Saro Urzì; Luisa Della Noce; Sylva Koscina; Edoardo Nevola
- Cinematography: Leonida Barboni
- Music by: Carlo Rustichelli
- Release date: 11 August 1956 (Italy)
- Running time: 118 minutes
- Country: Italy
- Language: Italian

The Railroad Man (Italian: Il Ferroviere) is a 1956 Italian drama film directed by Pietro Germi.

== Plot ==
Train operator Andrea Marcocci witnesses the suicide of a desperate man who jumps in front of his train. Under the influence of this shock, he starts making mistakes. A check-up by a doctor reveals that he's at the brink of becoming an alcoholic. Due to this evaluation, he is demoted and must accept a salary cut.

== Cast ==
- Pietro Germi - Andrea Marcocci
- Luisa Della Noce - Sara Marcocci
- Sylva Koscina - Giulia Marcocci (as Silva)
- Saro Urzì - Gigi Liverani
- Carlo Giuffrè - Renato Borghi
- Renato Speziali - Marcello Marcocci
- Edoardo Nevola - Sandro Marcocci (as il piccolo Edoardo Nevola)

== Awards ==
- 1956 Cannes Film Festival : OCIC Award - Special Mention
- Nastro d'Argento : Best Director, Best Producer.
- San Sebastian Film Festival : Best Film, Best Director, Best Actress (Luisa Della Noce)
