= Ennio De Concini =

Italian film director

- Born: 9 December 1923; Rome, Italy
- Died: 17 November 2008 (aged 84); Italy
- Occupation(s): Screenwriter, film director
- Notable work: Divorce Italian Style
- Children: Corrado De Concini

Ennio De Concini (9 December 1923, Rome – 17 November 2008) was an Italian screenwriter and film director, winning the Academy Award in 1962 for the Best Original Screenplay for Divorce Italian Style.

== Life and career ==
He was the co-screenwriter of The Red Tent a 1969 film starring Sean Connery which was based on Umberto Nobile's disastrous 1928 expedition to the North Pole in the airship Italia. Among the 60 films to his credit are The Twist (1976), Four of the Apocalypse (1975), Hitler: The Last Ten Days (1973), Battle of the Worlds (1961), Black Sunday (1960), Long Night in 1943 (1960), Il Grido (1957), War and Peace (1956), and Mambo (1954).

With his wife, Ninni, he had a son, Corrado De Concini, who is a noted mathematician.

== Selected filmography ==
- Vacation with a Gangster (1951)
- The Angels of the District (1952)
- Brothers of Italy (1952)
- Sunday Heroes (1952)
- The Italians They Are Crazy (1958)
- The Facts of Murder (1959)
- The Warrior Empress (1960)
- Taras Bulba, the Cossack (1962)
- The Dark Sun (1990)
