= The Bandit of Tacca Del Lupo =

- Directed by: Pietro Germi
- Written by: Federico Fellini; Pietro Germi; Tullio Pinelli
- Story by: Riccardo Bacchelli
- Cinematography: Leonida Barboni
- Edited by: Rolando Benedetti
- Music by: Carlo Rustichelli
- Release date: 1952
- Country: Italy
- Language: Italian

The Bandit of Tacca Del Lupo (Italian: Il brigante di Tacca del Lupo) is a 1952 Italian historical drama film directed by Pietro Germi.

== Plot ==
In 1863 a company of Italian Bersaglieri commanded by Captain Giordani, as part of the repression of banditry, was charged with freeing the area of Melfi from a band commanded by an individual nicknamed Raffa Raffa, faithful to the House of Bourbon-Two Sicilies. Captain Giordani is determined to use the most energetic and quick means in the fight, while police commissioner Siceli, who came from Foggia to support the Bersaglieri, prefers cunning and tries to avoid the use of force. After various vicissitudes, the Bersaglieri will be able to storm hiding place of Raffa Raffa, who will be killed in a final duel by Carmine, husband of a woman named Zitamaria, who helped the Bersaglieri in order to avenge the rape suffered by his wife at the hands of the brigand.

== Cast ==
- Amedeo Nazzari as Giordani, Bersaglieri Captain
- Cosetta Greco as Zitamaria
- Saro Urzì as Police Commissioner Francesco Siceli
- Fausto Tozzi as Lt. Magistrelli
- Aldo Bufi Landi as Lt. Righi
- Vincenzo Musolino as Carmine
- Oreste Romoli as Raffa Raffa
- Oscar Andriani as The General
- Alfredo Bini as De Giustino
- Amedeo Trilli as Sgt. Trilli
