= A Man of Straw =

1958 film by Pietro Germi

- Film poster
- Directed by: Pietro Germi
- Written by: Pietro Germi; Alfredo Giannetti; Leonardo Benvenuti; Piero De Bernardi
- Produced by: Franco Cristaldi
- Starring: Pietro Germi
- Cinematography: Leonida Barboni
- Edited by: Dolores Tamburini
- Music by: Carlo Rustichelli
- Release date: 1958
- Running time: 120 minutes
- Country: Italy
- Language: Italian

A Man of Straw (Italian: L'uomo di paglia) is a 1958 Italian drama film directed by Pietro Germi. It was entered into the 1958 Cannes Film Festival.

== Cast ==
- Pietro Germi - Andrea
- Franca Bettoia - Rita
- Luisa Della Noce - Luisa
- Edoardo Nevola - Giulio
- Saro Urzì - Beppe
- Romolo Giordani - Caporetto
- Luciano Marin - Gino
- Mirella Monti - Rita's mother
- Renato Montalbano - Rita's boyfriend
- Milly
- Bruna Cealti
- Anna Gruber
- Ida Masetti
- Marcella Rovena
