= Lost Youth =

- Directed by: Pietro Germi
- Written by: Pietro Germi; Mario Monicelli; Antonio Pietrangeli; Enzo Provenzale; Leopoldo Trieste
- Produced by: Carlo Ponti
- Starring: Massimo Girotti; Jacques Sernas; Carla Del Poggio
- Distributed by: Lux Film
- Release date: October 26, 1949 (American release)
- Language: Italian

Lost Youth (Italian: Gioventù perduta) is a 1948 Italian-language drama film directed by Pietro Germi. The style of the film is close to the Italian neorealism film movement. It was remade in 1953 as the British film Black 13.

Two important future film directors, Mario Monicelli & Antonio Pietrangeli, co-wrote the script.

== Cast ==
- Jacques Sernas: Stefano
- Carla Del Poggio: Luisa
- Massimo Girotti: Marcello Mariani
- Franca Maresa: Maria Rivano
- Diana Borghese: Stella
- Nando Bruno: Police commissioner
- Leo Garavaglia: Manfredi
- Emma Baron: Stefano's mother
- Dino Maronetto: Berto
- Giorgio Metrailler: Gianni
- Franco Pesce: Police photographer
- Michele Riccardini: Sor Giuseppe

== Awards ==
The film won 2 Nastro d'Argento awards: Best Script, Best Best Foreign Actor in Italian Film (Jacques Sernas).
