= Path of Hope =

1950 Italian film

- Directed by: Pietro Germi
- Written by: Pietro Germi; Federico Fellini; Tullio Pinelli; Luciano Vincenzoni
- Produced by: Luigi Rovere
- Starring: Raf Vallone; Saro Urzì; Elena Varzi
- Cinematography: Leonida Barboni
- Edited by: Rolando Benedetti
- Distributed by: Lux Film
- Release date: 22 November 1950 (Italian release)
- Running time: 100 minutes
- Country: Italy
- Language: Italian

Path of Hope (Italian: Il cammino della speranza) is a 1950 Italian language drama film directed by Pietro Germi that belongs to the Italian neorealism film movement. It is based on Nino Di Maria's novel Cuori negli abissi. Federico Fellini co-wrote the script. In July 2021, the film was shown in the Cannes Classics section at the 2021 Cannes Film Festival.

In 2008, the film was included on the Italian Ministry of Cultural Heritage’s 100 Italian films to be saved, a list of 100 films that "have changed the collective memory of the country between 1942 and 1978."

== Plot ==
The film presents the travel of a group of poor Sicilians to France in their dreams of a better life.

Women wait anxiously at a minehead in Capodarso, Sicily. Their men are underground. The mine is closing and the miners refuse to come up unless the owner relents. After three days, they give up in despair... In a bar in town, Ciccio is recruiting workers for jobs in France. He can get people over the border — for L20,000 a head. Enough people to fill a bus, having sold their belongings to pay the fee, including Saro and his three young children, and Barbara and her man Vanni, who's in trouble with the law and desperate to flee Italy.

After reaching Naples by train, Ciccio tries to slip away but is grabbed by Vanni. Vanni tells Barbara where to meet at the border if anything should go wrong. In Rome, Ciccio points out Vanni to the police. In the shoot-out, both Vanni and Ciccio escape. The others are arrested. They are ordered by the police to return to Sicily or be charged with "illegal expatriation".

With Saro as leader, and nearly out of money, they head north instead. Hardship draws Saro and Barbara closer together.

== Cast ==
- Raf Vallone - Saro Cammarata
- Elena Varzi - Barbara Spadaro
- Saro Urzì - Ciccio Ingaggiatore
- Franco Navarra - Vanni
- Liliana Lattanzi - Rosa
- Mirella Ciotti - Lorenza
- Saro Arcidiacono - Accountant
- Francesco Tomalillo - Misciu (as Francesco Tomolillo)
- Paolo Reale - Brasi
- Giuseppe Priolo - Luca
- Renato Terra - Mommino
- Carmela Trovato - Cirmena
- Angelo Grasso - Antonio
- Assunta Radico - Beatificata
- Francesca Russella - Grandmother

== Awards ==
Wins

- 1st Berlin International Film Festival - Silver Bear

Nominations

- 1951 Cannes Film Festival - Palme d'Or
