= Mademoiselle Gobette =

1952 film

- Directed by: Pietro Germi
- Written by: Maurice Hennequin (play La Présidente); Pierre Veber (play La Présidente)
- Cinematography: Leonida Barboni
- Edited by: Rolando Benedetti
- Music by: Carlo Rustichelli
- Release date: 1952
- Country: Italy
- Language: Italian

Mademoiselle Gobette (Italian: La Presidentessa) is a 1952 Italian comedy film directed by Pietro Germi.

== Cast ==
- Silvana Pampanini: Gobette
- Aroldo Tieri: Judge Luciano Pinglet
- Carlo Dapporto: Cipriano Gaudet
- Ave Ninchi: Aglae Tricoin
- Luigi Pavese: President Tricoin
- Marilyn Buferd: Angelina
- Paolo Stoppa
- Nico Pepe
- Laura Gore
- Ernesto Calindri
- Eva Vanicek

== Reception ==
Robert Hawkins of Variety wrote that the film "has several dull stretches, failing to capitalize on its potentials." He opined that Germi's direction "allows the actors the actors a full range, with some resultant overplaying."

== See also ==
- Madame la Presidente (1916)
- The President (1938)
- La presidentessa (1977)
