= Divorce Italian Style =

1961 film by Pietro Germi

- Theatrical release poster
- Italian: Divorzio all'italiana
- Directed by: Pietro Germi
- Screenplay by: Alfredo Giannetti; Ennio De Concini; Pietro Germi; Agenore Incrocci (uncredited)
- Based on: Un delitto d'onore by Giovanni Arpino
- Produced by: Franco Cristaldi
- Starring: Marcello Mastroianni; Daniela Rocca; Stefania Sandrelli; Leopoldo Trieste; Odoardo Spadaro; Rita Girelli; Angela Cardile; Lando Buzzanca; Pietro Tordi; Ugo Torrente
- Cinematography: Leonida Barboni; Carlo Di Palma
- Edited by: Roberto Cinquini
- Music by: Carlo Rustichelli
- Production companies: Lux Film; Vides Cinematografica; Galatea Film
- Distributed by: Lux Film
- Release date: 20 December 1961
- Running time: 108 minutes
- Country: Italy
- Language: Italian
- Box office: $2.3 million (US and Canada rentals)

Divorce Italian Style (Italian: Divorzio all'italiana) is a 1961 Italian black comedy film directed by Pietro Germi, who co-wrote the screenplay with Alfredo Giannetti, Ennio De Concini, and Agenore Incrocci, based on Giovanni Arpino's 1960 novel Un delitto d'onore (English title: A Crime of Honor). It stars Marcello Mastroianni, Daniela Rocca, Stefania Sandrelli, and Leopoldo Trieste.

In the film, an impoverished Sicilian nobleman is trapped in a loveless marriage. Divorce is illegal, so he starts fantasizing about uxoricide. In the belief that honor killings involving adultery result in light sentences for the killers, he schemes to find a lover for his wife in order to have an excuse for an honor killing. His plan meets with a number of unexpected complications.

The film won the Academy Award for Best Original Screenplay, two Golden Globe Awards and numerous other international film prizes. In 2008, it was included in the Italian Ministry of Cultural Heritage's 100 Italian films to be saved, a list of 100 films that "have changed the collective memory of the country between 1942 and 1978".

== Plot ==
In the Sicilian town of Agramonte, Ferdinando Cefalù, a 37-year-old impoverished nobleman, has been married for 12 years to Rosalia, a devoted wife he no longer loves. He is in love with his 16-year-old cousin Angela, whom he sees only during the summer because her family sends her away to Catholic school in the city. Besides his wife, he shares his life with his elderly parents, his sister, and her fiancé, a funeral director. The family share their once stately palace with his uncles, who are slowly but surely eating away the remainders of their once-rich estate.

Aware that divorce is illegal, Ferdinando fantasizes about killing Rosalia, such as by throwing her into a boiling cauldron, sending her into space in a rocket, or drowning her in quicksand. After a chance encounter with Angela during a family trip, he discovers that she shares his feelings.

Inspired by a local story of a woman who killed her husband in a fit of jealousy, Ferdinando resolves to lead his wife into having an affair so that he can catch her in flagrante delicto, murder her, and receive a light sentence for committing an honor killing. He first needs to find a suitable lover for his wife, whom he finds in the local priest's godson, Carmelo Patanè, a painter who has had feelings for Rosalia for years. For a time, he was presumed killed during World War II. Ferdinando also procures the State Prosecutor's friendship with a small favor. The final stage of his plan is to arrange for Carmelo's constant presence in his house, which he achieves by feigning interest in having his palace frescoes restored.

Carmelo is timid with Rosalia, and she is initially committed to conjugal fidelity. Ferdinando tapes their private conversations and has to ward off the maid Sisina's infatuation with Carmelo. After Carmelo makes a pass at Sisina, she tells the priest, Carmelo's godfather, in confession, who informs her that Carmelo is married with three children. She relays that information to Ferdinando. Rosalia and Carmelo finally give in to their passion, but the tape of their conversation runs out just as they are arranging their next meeting. All Ferdinando knows is that it will take place the next evening.

Rosalia feigns a headache and remains home while the rest of the family goes to the cinema to see the local première of La Dolce Vita, a film so scandalous that no one wants to miss it. Ferdinando sneaks out of the cinema and returns home, arriving just in time to see Rosalia leaving for the train station. He retrieves his gun to kill her, but arrives at the station just after their train departs. He revisits his plan and the Criminal Code. It defines a crime of passion as executed in the heat of the moment or in defense of one's honor, so he embraces the role of a cuckold.

All along, Angela has been writing Ferdinando to assure him of her undying love for him. Her last letter is misdelivered to her father, who dies of a heart attack upon reading it. At the funeral, Ferdinando is approached by Mrs. Patanè, who demands to know what he will do about their situation. After he responds noncommittally, she spits in his face in front of the entire town, which gives him what he needs: an open insult to the family's honor due to his wife's elopement.

The local Mafia boss offers to find the lovers within 24 hours, which he does. As Ferdinando goes to the lovers' hideout, he hears Mrs. Patanè kill Carmelo. He follows suit and kills Rosalia. At his trial, he is defended by the State Prosecutor, who blames the incident on Ferdinando's father, declaring that he failed to give his son enough love when raising him as a boy. Ferdinando is released from prison after three years and returns to Agramonte, where he finally marries Angela.

Months later, Ferdinando and Angela are happily sailing at sea. As they kiss, Angela seductively rubs her foot against that of the young helmsman piloting the boat.

== Cast ==
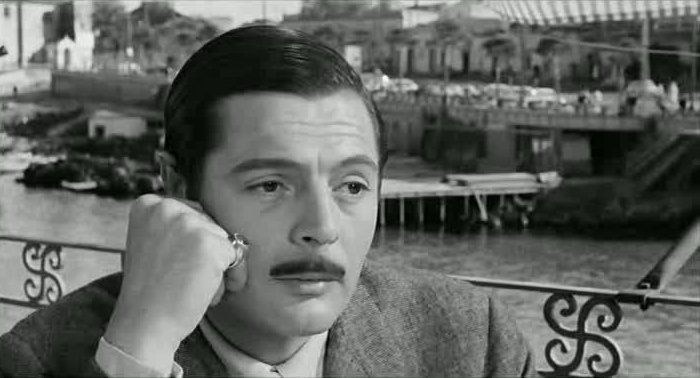
Marcello Mastroianni as Ferdinando Cefalù

- Marcello Mastroianni as Ferdinando Cefalù
- Daniela Rocca as Rosalia Cefalù
- Stefania Sandrelli as Angela
- Leopoldo Trieste as Carmelo Patanè
- Odoardo Spadaro as Don Gaetano Cefalù
- Margherita Girelli as Sisina
- Angela Cardile as Agnese
- Lando Buzzanca as Rosario Mulè
- Pietro Tordi as Attorney De Marzi
- Ugo Torrente as Don Calogero
- Antonio Acqua as priest
- Bianca Castagnetta as Donna Matilde Cefalù
- Giovanni Fassiolo as Don Ciccio Matara
- Edy Nogara as Immacolata Patanè

== Release ==
Divorce Italian Style was released in Rome in December 1961.

== Reception ==
=== Box office ===
When Divorce Italian Style was released in the United States, it earned theatrical rentals of $803,666 in 1962 and a further $1,449,347 in 1963 for a total of $2,252,013 in the United States and Canada. It was still in release in 1964.

=== Critical response ===
On the review aggregator website Rotten Tomatoes, the film holds an approval rating of 100% based on 18 reviews, with an average rating of 8.6/10. Upon release in the United States, Bosley Crowther of The New York Times called it "one of the funniest pictures the Italians have sent along" and praised Germi as "a genius with the sly twist". James Powers of The Hollywood Reporter praised the "mocking, sardonic farce" as "bold, irreverent, and human to the bone", and he predicted it would be successful in the United States due its dual nature as both an arthouse film and a film that achieves general appeal. Variety gave the film a positive review, calling the satire "a penetrating, almost brutal glimpse of Sicily and its antiquated way of life."

=== Accolades ===
Award	Category	Recipient(s)	Result
Academy Awards	Best Director	Pietro Germi	Nominated
Academy Awards	Best Actor	Marcello Mastroianni	Nominated
Academy Awards	Best Original Screenplay	Ennio De Concini, Alfredo Giannetti and Pietro Germi	Won
Avellino Neorealism Film Festival	Best Actress	Daniela Rocca	Won (Note: Tied with Gina Rovere for Adua and Her Friends)
British Academy Film Awards	Best Film from Any Source	Divorce Italian Style	Nominated
British Academy Film Awards	Best Foreign Actor	Marcello Mastroianni	Won
British Academy Film Awards	Best Foreign Actress	Daniela Rocca	Nominated
Cannes Film Festival	Prix de la meilleure comédie	Pietro Germi	Won
Directors Guild of America Awards	Outstanding Directorial Achievement in Motion Pictures	Pietro Germi	Nominated
Golden Globe Awards	Best Foreign Film – Foreign Language	Divorce Italian Style	Won
Golden Globe Awards	Best Actor in a Motion Picture – Musical or Comedy	Marcello Mastroianni	Won
Italian Golden Globe Awards	Best Film	Pietro Germi	Won
Nastro d'Argento	Best Producer	Franco Cristaldi	Nominated
Nastro d'Argento	Best Director	Pietro Germi	Nominated
Nastro d'Argento	Best Actor	Marcello Mastroianni	Won
Nastro d'Argento	Best Screenplay	Ennio de Concini, Alfredo Giannetti and Pietro Germi	Won
Nastro d'Argento	Best Original Story	Ennio de Concini, Alfredo Giannetti and Pietro Germi	Won
Nastro d'Argento	Best Production Design	Carlo Egidi	Nominated
National Board of Review Awards	Top Five Foreign Language Films	Divorce Italian Style	3rd Place
Thessaloniki International Film Festival	Honorary Award	Pietro Germi	Won (Note: Tied with Robert Dhéry for La Belle Américaine)

== Adaptations ==
In 2008, Giorgio Battistelli adapted Divorce Italian Style into an opera, Divorce à l'Italienne, which premiered by the Opéra national de Lorraine on 30 September of that year with tenor Wolfgang Ablinger Sperrhacke in Mastroianni's role. Battistelli chose to set every female role except Angela for low male voice; Bruno Praticò sang the role of Rosalia.

== See also ==
- Marriage Italian Style
