= Carlo Egidi =

Italian scenographer and costume designer

- Born: 20 May 1918; Rome, Lazio, Kingdom of Italy
- Died: 2 February 1989 (aged 70); Milan, Lombardy, Italy
- Occupation: Art director
- Years active: 1945-1975 (film)

Carlo Egidi (20 May 1918 – 2 February 1989) was an Italian art director. He worked on the set design of more than sixty films during his career. One of his earliest credits was the neorealist Bitter Rice (1949).

== Selected filmography ==
- No Turning Back (1945)
- Tragic Hunt (1947)
- Bitter Rice (1949)
- The Emperor of Capri (1949)
- Toto Looks For a House (1949)
- No Peace Under the Olive Tree (1950)
- Four Ways Out (1951)
- A Husband for Anna (1953)
- Engaged to Death (1957)
- The Facts of Murder (1959)
- The Assassin (1961)
- Salvatore Giuliano (1962)
- The Empty Canvas (1963)
- The Conspirators (1969)

== Bibliography ==
- Ben-Ghiat, Ruth. The Cinema of Italy. Wallflower Press, 2004.
