= Alfredo Giannetti =

Italian screenwriter and film director

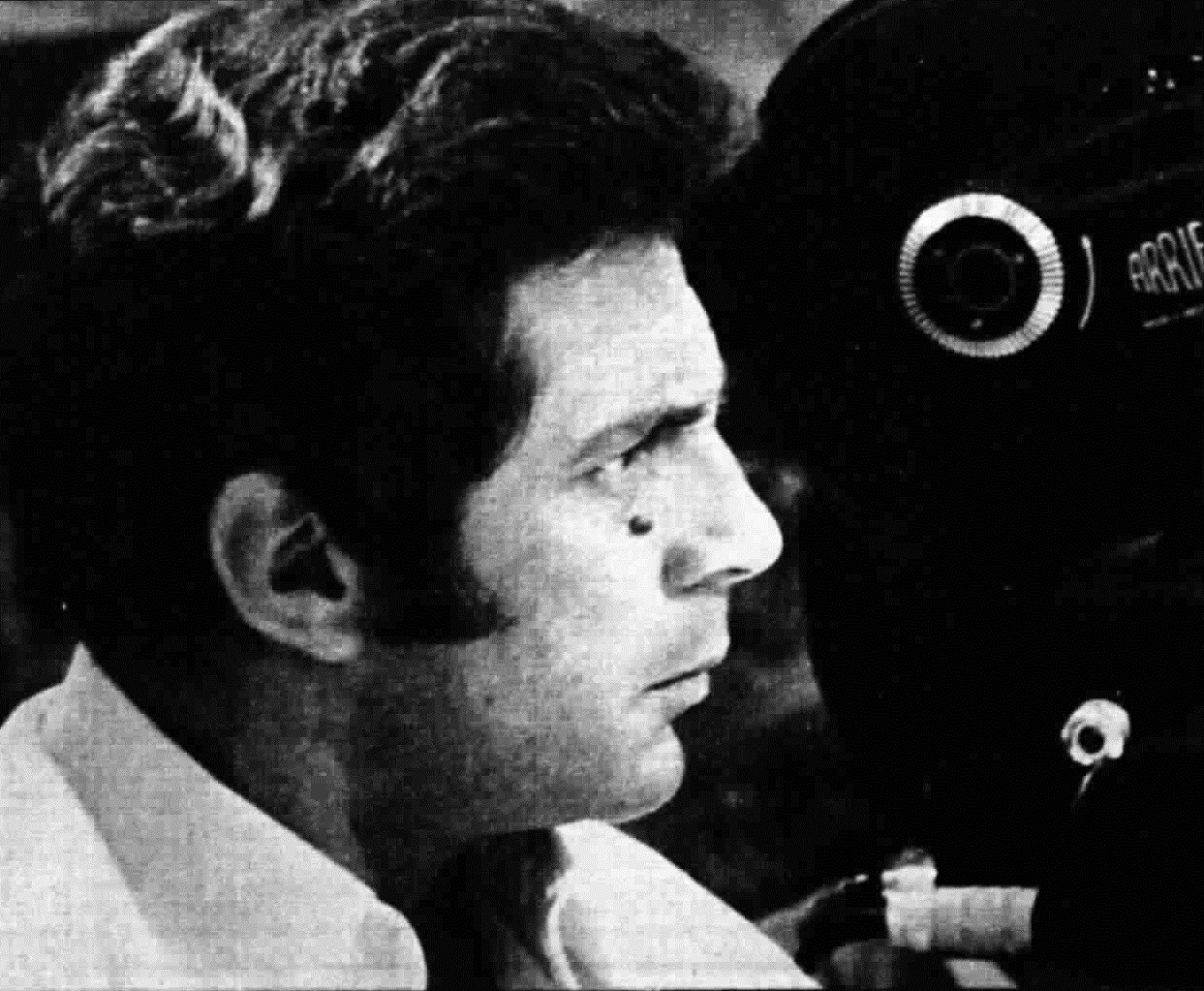
Alfredo Giannetti

Alfredo Giannetti (1924–1995) was an Italian screenwriter and film director. He won the Academy Award for Best Original Screenplay in 1962 for his work in Divorce Italian Style.

== Selected filmography ==
- The Railroad Man (1956)
- A Man of Straw (1958)
- Divorce Italian Style (1961)
- The Climax (1967)
- 1870 (1971)
- The Automobile (1971)
- Febbre da cavallo (1976)
- The Blue-Eyed Bandit (1980)
