= Carlo Rustichelli =

Italian composer

Carlo Rustichelli (24 December 1916 – 13 November 2004) was an Italian film composer whose career spanned the 1940s to about 1990. His prolific output included about 250 film compositions, as well as arrangements for other films, and music for television.

== Life ==
Born in Carpi, Emilia-Romagna to a family of music lovers, he gained a diploma in piano at the Conservatorio Giovanni Battista Martini in Bologna, going on to Rome where he studied composition at the Santa Cecilia Academy.

He had a wife (Evi), a son (Paolo, also a composer), and a daughter (Alida).

== Career ==
He met Federico Fellini in post-war Rome, and probably through him met Pietro Germi, for whom he composed his first major film score for Gioventù perduta (Lost Youth), and with whom he was most associated. He composed music for many Germi films in the 1940s, 50s and 60s.

In 1972 he was commissioned by Billy Wilder to compose the music for Avanti!.

== Selected filmography ==
- The Lion of Amalfi (Il Leone di Amalfi) (1950)
- The Crossroads (1951)
- Lorenzaccio (1951)
- The Counterfeiters (1951)
- The Enemy (1952)
- The Blind Woman of Sorrento (La cieca di Sorrento) (1952)
- The Bandit of Tacca Del Lupo (Il brigante di Tacca del Lupo) (1952)
- The Legend of the Piave (1952)
- Prisoner in the Tower of Fire (La prigioniera della torre di fuoco) (1953)
- Captain Phantom (Capitan Fantasma) (1953)
- Mid-Century Loves (Amori di mezzo secolo) (1954)
- Laugh! Laugh! Laugh! (1954)
- Cardinal Lambertini (1954)
- Disowned (1954)
- Desperate Farewell (1955)
- The Two Friends (1955)
- Rommel's Treasure (1955)
- They Stole a Tram (Hanno rubato un tram) (1956)
- The Railroad Man (Il Ferroviere) (1956)
- Fathers and Sons (Padri e figli) (1957)
- A Man of Straw (L'uomo di paglia) (1958)
- The Day the Sky Exploded (La morte viene dallo spazio) (1958)
- The Facts of Murder (1959)
- You're on Your Own (Arrangiatevi!) (1959)
- Hannibal (Annibale) (1959)
- The Giants of Thessaly (I giganti della Tessaglia) (1960)
- Minotaur, the Wild Beast of Crete (Teseo contro il Minotauro) (1960)
- Some Like It Cold (A noi piace freddo...!) (1960)
- Bed In Three Squares (Letto a tre piazze) (1960)
- Long Night in 1943 (La lunga notte del '43) (1960)
- Love in Rome (Un amore a Roma) (1960)
- Divorce Italian Style (Divorzio all'italiana) (1961)
- The Thief of Baghdad (1961)
- Queen of the Nile (1961)
- Creole Venus (Venere Creola) (1961)
- The Four Days of Naples (Le Quattro giornate di Napoli) (1962)
- La commare secca (1962)
- My son, the hero (1962)
- Ro.Go.Pa.G. (1963)
- The Whip and the Body (La frusta e il corpo) (1963)
- The Lion of St. Mark (Il Leone di San Marco) (1963)
- Hercules vs. Moloch (1963)
- La ragazza di Bube (1963)
- Coriolanus: Hero without a Country (Coriolano: eroe senza patria) (1963)
- The Organizer (I compagni) (1963)
- Seduced and Abandoned (Sedotta e abbandonata) (1964)
- Giants of Rome (I giganti di Roma) (1964)
- Terror of the Steppes (I predoni della steppa) (1964)
- Desert Raiders (Il dominatore del deserto) (1964)
- Samson vs. the Giant King (Maciste alla corte dello zar) (1964)
- The Betrothed (I promessi sposi) (1964)
- Blood and Black Lace (Sei donne per l'assassino) (1964)
- Buffalo Bill, Hero of the Far West (Buffalo Bill, l'eroe del far west) (1964)
- The Long Hair of Death (I lunghi capelli della morte) (1964)
- Sandokan to the Rescue (1964)
- Sandokan Against the Leopard of Sarawak (1964)
- The Adventurer of Tortuga (1964)
- Made in Italy (1965)
- Ringo's Big Night (La grande notte di Ringo) (1966)
- The Birds, the Bees and the Italians (Signore & Signori) (1966)
- Me, Me, Me... and the Others (Io, io, io... e gli altri) (1966)
- Seasons of Our Love (Le stagioni del nostro amore) (1966)
- For Love and Gold (1966)
- No Diamonds for Ursula (1967)
- Golden Chameleon (1967)
- Kill, Baby, Kill (Operazione paura) (1966)
- Kill or Be Killed (Uccidi o muori) (1966)
- Golden Chameleon (1967)
- God Forgives... I Don't! (Dio perdona... io no!) (1967)
- One Dollar Too Many (I tre che sconvolsero il West) (1968)
- Train for Durango (Un treno per Durango) (1968)
- A Minute to Pray, a Second to Die (1968)
- The Ruthless Four (Ognuno per sé) (1968)
- Seven Men and One Brain (1968)
- Ace High (I quattro dell'Ave Maria) (1968)
- The Odyssey (1968)
- Satyricon (1969)
- The Battle of El Alamein (La battaglia di El Alamein) (1969)
- Blow Hot, Blow Cold (Violenza al sole) (1969)
- Boot Hill (La collina degli stivali) (1969)
- Transplant (Il trapianto) (1970)
- Mafia Connection (E venne il giorno dei limoni neri) (1970)
- Brancaleone at the Crusades (Brancaleone alle Crociate) (1970)
- A Pocketful of Chestnuts (Le castagne sono buone) (1970)
- A Sword for Brando (Una spada per Brando) (1970)
- Bubù (1971)
- In the Name of the Italian People (In nome del popolo italiano) (1971)
- Sergeant Klems (1971)
- The Call of the Wild (1972)
- Alfredo, Alfredo (1972)
- Avanti! (1972)
- We Want the Colonels (Vogliamo i colonnelli) (1973)
- Dirty Weekend (Mordi e fuggi) (1973)
- Gang War in Milan (Milano rovente) (1973)
- The Black Hand (La mano nera) (1973)
- Little Funny Guy (L'emigrante) (1973)
- White Fang (Zanna Bianca) (1973)
- Challenge to White Fang (Il ritorno di Zanna Bianca) (1974)
- White Fang to the Rescue (Zanna Bianca alla riscossa) (1974)
- Salvo D'Acquisto (1974)
- Somewhere Beyond Love (Delitto d'amore) (1974)
- City Under Siege (Un uomo, una città) (1974)
- Cormack of the Mounties (Giubbe rosse) (1975)
- Il gatto mammone (1975)
- My Friends (Amici miei) (1975)
- A Woman at Her Window (Une femme à sa fenêtre) (1976)
- Le Gang (1977)
- Man in a Hurry (L'Homme pressé) (1977)
- Loggerheads (1978)
- The New Beaujolais Wine Has Arrived... (Le beaujolais nouveau est arrivé) (1978))
- Safari Rally (6000 km di paura) (1978)
- Assassination on the Tiber (Assassinio sul Tevere) (1979)
- Forest of Love (Bosco d'amore) (1981)
- All My Friends Part 2 (Amici miei - Atto II) (1982)
- Heads I Win, Tails You Lose (Testa o croce) (1982)
- Blade Master (Ator 2 - L'invincibile Orion) (1984)
- Woman of Wonders (La donna delle meraviglie) (1985)
