= Pietro Germi =

Italian screenwriter, director, actor (1914–1974)

- Germi in 1960
- Born: 14 September 1914; Genoa, Kingdom of Italy
- Died: 5 December 1974 (aged 60); Rome, Italy
- Occupations: Screenwriter; film director; actor
- Years active: 1939–1974
- Height: 1.78 m (5 ft 10 in)

Pietro Germi (Italian pronunciation: [ˈpjɛːtro ˈdʒɛrmi]; 14 September 1914 – 5 December 1974) was an Italian film director, screenwriter, and actor, noted for his development of the neorealist and commedia all'italiana genres.

His 1961 film Divorce Italian Style earned him a Best Original Screenplay Oscar and a Best Director nomination at the 35th Academy Awards. Seven of his films competed at the Cannes Film Festival, with his 1966 comedy The Birds, the Bees and the Italians winning the Palme d'Or.

== Biography ==
He studied acting and directing at Rome's Centro Sperimentale di Cinematografia. During his time in school, Germi supported himself by working as an extra, bit actor, assistant director, and, on occasion, writer. Germi made his directorial debut in 1945 with the film Il testimone. His early work, this film included, were very much in the Italian neorealist style; many were social dramas that dealt with contemporary issues pertaining to people of Sicilian heritage.

Through the years, Germi shifted away from social drama towards satirical comedies, but retained his loved element of the Sicilian people. In the 1960s, Germi received worldwide success with the films Divorce Italian Style, Seduced and Abandoned, and The Birds, the Bees and the Italians. He was nominated for Academy Awards in both directing and writing for Divorce Italian Style, and, subsequently, won in the writing category. He also won the Grand Prize at the Cannes Film Festival for The Birds, the Bees and the Italians. His 1968 film Serafino won the Golden Prize at the 6th Moscow International Film Festival.

Germi collaborated on the scripts for all the films he directed and appeared as an actor in a few of them. He died in Rome of hepatitis on 5 December 1974.

== Selected filmography ==
=== Director ===
- The Testimony (1946)
- Lost Youth (1947)
- In the Name of the Law (1949)
- Path of Hope (1950)
- Four Ways Out (1951)
- The Bandit of Tacca Del Lupo (1952)
- Mademoiselle Gobette (1952)
- Jealousy (1953)
- Mid-Century Loves (segment "Guerra 1915—18", 1954)
- The Railroad Man (1956)
- A Man of Straw (1958)
- The Facts of Murder (1959)
- Divorce Italian Style (1961)
- Seduced and Abandoned (1964)
- The Birds, the Bees and the Italians (1966)
- The Climax (1967)
- Serafino (1968)
- A Pocketful of Chestnuts (1970)
- Alfredo, Alfredo (1972)

=== Writer ===
- Backstage (1939)
- The Son of the Red Corsair (1943)
- The Ten Commandments (1945)
- The Testimony (1946)
- Lost Youth (1947)
- In the Name of the Law (1948)
- Path of Hope (1950)
- Against the Law (1950)
- Four Ways Out (1951)
- Mademoiselle Gobete (1952)
- The Bandit of Tacca Del Lupo (1952)
- Jealousy (1953)
- Mid-Century Loves (1953, episode 2)
- The Railroad Man (1956)
- A Man of Straw (1957)
- Divorce Italian Style (1961)
- Seduced and Abandoned (1963)
- The Birds, the Bees and the Italians (1965)
- The Climax (1967)
- Serafino (1968)
- A Pocketful of Chestnuts (1970)
- Alfredo, Alfredo (1972)

=== Actor ===
- The Fornaretto of Venice (1939) - Frate domenicano
- Montecassino (1946)
- Escape to France (1948) - Tembien
- The Railroad Man (1956) - Andrea Marcocci
- A Man of Straw (1958) - Andrea
- The Facts of Murder (1959) - Il Dott. Ingravallo
- Five Branded Women (1960) - Partisan Commander
- Lipstick (1960) - Commissario Fioresi
- Blood Feud (1961)
- The Lovemakers (1961) - Stefano
- A Man Named John (1965) - Pontiff's Father (final film role)

== Notes ==
- The Film Encyclopedia by Ephraim Katz - 1993 edition
