= Sambuy Garden =

Public gardens in Ivrea, Italy

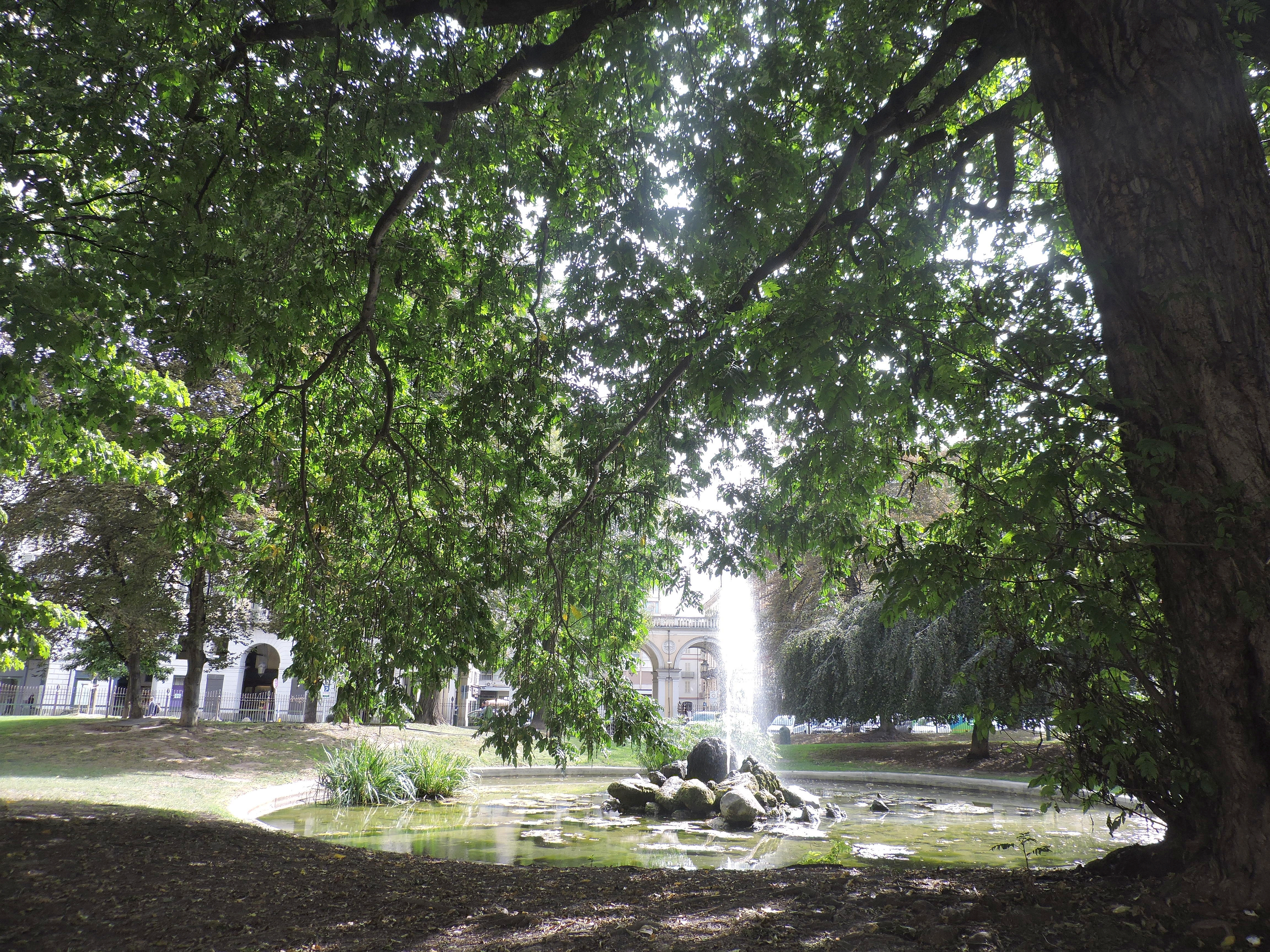
- Sambuy Garden in 2018
- Interactive map of Sambuy Garden
- Location: Turin, Italy
- Coordinates: 45°03′48.82″N 7°40′46.24″E
- Area: 0.82 hectares (2.0 acres)

Sambuy Garden (Italian: Giardino Sambuy) is a public park located in Turin, Italy.

== History ==
The garden was designed by the French landscape architect Jean-Pierre Barillet-Deschamps and completed in 1861 as part of a broader urban redevelopment plan for Turin's public and green spaces. In 1926, the garden was named after Ernesto Balbo Bertone di Sambuy, who served as mayor of the city from 1883 to 1886 and had previously overseen Turin's public gardens.

== Description ==
The garden occupies the center of Piazza Carlo Felice, directly opposite Torino Porta Nuova railway station in the city centre. Designed in the style of 19th-century French landscape gardening, it is characterized by tree-lined walkways, geometric flowerbeds, and a large ornamental pool with a monumental fountain facing Via Roma. The park also contains a gazebo, centuries-old trees, including horse chestnuts and beeches, as well as monuments dedicated to Edmondo De Amicis, Massimo d'Azeglio, and Ernesto di Sambuy.
