= Alla mia cara mamma nel giorno del suo compleanno =

1974 film

- Directed by: Luciano Salce
- Written by: Luciano Salce; Massimo Franciosa; Sergio Corbucci
- Produced by: Rusconi - CIC
- Starring: Paolo Villaggio
- Cinematography: Erico Menczer
- Edited by: Amedeo Salfa
- Music by: Franco Micalizzi
- Release date: 1974
- Running time: 105 min
- Country: Italy
- Language: Italian

Alla mia cara mamma nel giorno del suo compleanno (To my dear mother on the day of her birthday) is a 1974 Italian comedy drama film directed by Luciano Salce.

== Plot ==
The young noble Didino is a big baby and an introvert man who has trouble socializing because of the possessive mother. He is still treated in thirty years as a kid and does not know what to do to overcome his shyness, because no one of his family listens to him, and his uncle, worsening the situation, believes that he is mentally ill and also homosexual. By mistake the old servant of the family dies in an accident at home, so the mother of Didino calls a new scullery maid: a beautiful girl who falls in love with Didino. He too feels love for her, but does not know how to react because he is afraid that the mother can punish severely him. Initially Didino manages to overcome the fears and also design the flight home with the maid. The mother agrees and one evening in tears, begging her son to grant to him the last bath. This is a pretext of the mother to drown her son, so she can stay with him forever, even after death. While Didino dies drowned the servant under the house waits in tears for his arrival ...

== Cast ==
- Paolo Villaggio: Count Fernando aka "Didino"
- Lila Kedrova: Countess Mafalda
- Eleonora Giorgi: Angela
- Jimmy il Fenomeno: Savior
- Antonino Faà di Bruno: Uncle Alberto
- Renato Chiantoni: Anchise
- Orchidea De Santis: Jolanda
- Vera Drudi: Driade
- Guido Cerniglia:Cesarino
