= Alexandria Governorate =

Governorate of Egypt

Coordinates: 31°10′N 29°53′E

Alexandria Governorate محافظة الإسكندرية Muḥāfaẓat al-Iskandarīyah
- Governorate
- Flag Emblem

- Alexandria Governorate on the map of Egypt
- Country: Egypt
- Seat: Alexandria (capital)

Government
  - Governor: Eng. Ayman Mohammed Ibrahim Ahmed Ateyya

Area
  - Total: 2,818 km^{2} (1,088 sq mi)

Population (January 2024)
  - Total: 5,599,387
  - Density: 1,987/km^{2} (5,146/sq mi)

GDP
  - Total: EGP 566 billion (US$ 36 billion)
- Time zone: UTC+2 (EGY)
  - Summer (DST): UTC+3 (EEST)
- Calling code: (+20) 3
- National Day: July 26 (Departure of King Farouk)
- HDI (2021): 0.780high · 3rd
- Website: www.alexandria.gov.eg

Alexandria Governorate (Arabic: محافظة الإسكندرية, romanized: Muḥāfaẓat al-Iskandarīyah) is one of the governorates of Egypt. The city of Alexandria was historically the capital of Egypt until the foundation of Fustat, which was later absorbed into Cairo. Today, the governorate is considered second in importance after the Cairo Governorate. It is located in the northern part of the country, directly on the Mediterranean Sea, making it one of the most important harbours in Egypt.

Along with Cairo, Port Said and Suez, Alexandria is one of four governorates in Egypt that also function as municipalities. Its capital is the city of Alexandria, the second-largest city in the country. The governorate stretches for about 70 km along the Mediterranean coast northwest of the Nile Delta. It is bordered by the Mediterranean Sea to the north, Beheira Governorate in the south and east and Matrouh Governorate in the west. The governorate covers a total area of almost 2818 km^{2}. It has the most important harbour in Egypt and is the country's second-largest urban governorate with population of more than four and half million (4,799,740 as of March 2015) and population density of 1,700 people per square kilometre according to the Central Agency for Public Mobilization and Statistics (CAPMAS). Alexandria has a unique geographical location and a mild climate. It is also considered an industrial governorate where 40% of Egyptian industries are concentrated, especially in chemicals, food, spinning and weaving as well as petrol industries and fertilizers.

== Demographics ==
Historical population
Year	Pop.	±% p.a.
1986	2,917,327	—
1996	3,339,076	+1.36%
2006	4,123,869	+2.13%
2017	5,163,750	+2.07%
2023	5,523,511	+1.13%

== Municipal divisions ==
The governorate is divided into several municipal divisions with a total estimated population of 5,599,387 as of January 2024.

Subdivisions of Alexandria Governorate

Municipal Divisions
Number	Anglicized name	Native name	Egyptian Arabic transliteration	Population (January 2023 Est.)	Type
1	Alexandria Port Police Dept.	ادارة شرطه ميناء الإسكندرية	Edaret Shortet Mīna Eskenderiyyah	0	Police-administrated Area
2	El Dekhela	الدخيله	El-Dekheilah	502,094	Kism (district)
3	1st El Amreya	قسم أول العامريه	Esm Awwal El-ʻamreyyah	504,562	Kism (district)
4	2nd El Amreya	قسم تانى العامريه	Esm Tani El-ʻamriyyah	295,528	Kism (district)
5	El Atareen	العطارين	El-ʻattārīn	39,159	Kism (district)
6	El Gomrok	الجمرك	El-Gomrok	98,055	Kism (district)
7	El Labban	اللبان	El-Labbān	43,578	Kism (district)
8	El Manshiyya	المنشيه	El-Mansheyyah	24,903	Kism (fully urban)
9	1st El Montaza	قسم أول المنتزه	Esm Awwal El-Montazah	1,109,010	Kism (district)
10	2nd El Montaza	قسم تانى المنتزه	Esm Tāni El-Montazah	575,067	Kism (fully urban)
11	1st El Raml	قسم أول الرمل	Esm Awwal Er-Raml 1	294,477	Kism (district)
12	2nd El Raml	قسم تانى الرمل	Esm Tani El-Raml 2	669,233	Kism (district)
13	North Coast	الساحل الشمالى	El-Sāḥel El-Shamāli	2,963	Unorganized Area
14	Bab Shar'	باب شرق	Bāb Shar'	240,760	Kism (fully urban)
15	Borg El Arab	برج العرب	Borg el-ʻarab	92,175	Markaz
16	Karmouz	كرموز	Karmūz	110,533	Kism (fully urban)
17	New Borg El Arab City	برج العرب الجديده	Borg el-ʻarab el-Gedīdah	43,921	New City
18	Mina El Basal	مينا البصل	Mīna el-Basal	268,252	Kism (fully urban)
19	Moharam Bek	محرم بك	Mḥarram Beh	297,318	Kism (fully urban)
20	Sidi Gaber	سيدى جابر	Sīdi Gāber	267,152	Kism (district)

=== Districts ===
Districts of Alexandria Governorate

The municipal divisions are further grouped into 10 districts (singular: حى ḥay, plural: أحياء aḥya') which fall directly under the administration of the Alexandria Governorate, while the New Borg El Arab City falls under the jurisdiction of the New Urban Communities Authority .

== Industrial zones ==
According to the General Authority for Investment and Free Zones (GAFI), the following industrial zones are located in Alexandria:

Zone name
31 Km Desert Road Industrial Zone
El Agami South Betash
El Nahda Industrial Zone
El Nasria Industrial Zone
Margham Industrial Zone
New El Manshia Industrial Zone
Om Zeghio Industrial Zone
Sebko Industrial Zone

== Tourism ==
Alexandria is known with its diverse history as it was occupied by several cultures throughout the years. Several monuments nowadays shape Alexandria's historic sites.

=== Monuments ===
- Bibliotheca Alexandrina
- Citadel of Qaitbay
- Graeco-Roman Museum
- Alexandria National Museum
- Royal Jewelry Museum
- Serapeum
- Pompey's Pillar
- Roman amphitheatre
- Lighthouse of Alexandria

=== Gardens ===
- Al Montaza Gardens
- Al Shallalat Gardens
- Antoniadis Garden
- El-Nozha Garden
- International Park of Alexandria

== Education ==
=== Notable educational institutes ===
- Bibliotheca Alexandrina
- Alexandria University
- Alexandria International University
- Borg El Arab Technological University
- Senghor University
- Arab Academy for Science, Technology, and Maritime Transport
- Egypt-Japan University of Science and Technology in New Borg El Arab city.
- City of Scientific Research and Technological Applications
- Pharos University
- Higher Institute of Engineering and Technology

=== Schools ===
- Forsan American School
- Forsan International School
- Riada American School
- Riada Language School
- Gems Alexandria Academy
- Brilliance Academy
- Schutz American School
- House of English
- New El Quds International School
- International British School of Alexandria

== Sports ==
Alexandria Governorate has several sports clubs such as:

- El Ittihad Alexandria Club
- Egyptian Olympic Athletes Club
- Smouha Sporting Club
- Alexandria Sporting Club (ASC)

The most common sport in Alexandria Governorate is football, with the governorate holding three main stadiums:

- Borg El Arab Stadium
- Alexandria Stadium
- Haras El-Hedoud Stadium

== List of governors ==
Alexandria Governorate has had several governors throughout the years, below is listed the former governors since 1952

1. Counselor Mohammed Mustafa Kamal Dib (from April 10, 1952 to January 5, 1957)
2. Mr. Mahmoud Ismael Mehanna (from March 4, 1957 to September 10, 1960)
3. Major Sedeek Abdul Latif (from October 8, 1960 to November 12, 1961)
4. Mr. Mohammed Hamdi Ashour (from November 12, 1961 to October 27, 1968)
5. Major General Ahmed Kamel (from November 6, 1968 to November 17, 1970)
6. Major Mamdouh Salem (from November 18, 1970 to May 13, 1971)
7. Dr. Ahmed Fouad Muhyiddin (from May 8, 1971 to September 7, 1972)
8. Prof. Abdel Moneim Wehbe (From September 8, 1972 to May 28, 1974)
9. Major General. Ahmed Abdel Tawab Hdaib (from May 29, 1974 to November 27, 1978)
10. Prof. Mohamed Fouad Hilmi (from November 28, 1978 to May 14, 1980)
11. Prof. Naim Mustafa Abu Talib (from May 15, 1980 to August 23, 1981)
12. Mr. Mohammed Saeed Al-Mahi (from August 24, 1981 to May 17, 1982)
13. Major General Mohamed Fawzy Maaz (from May 18, 1982 to June 9, 1986)
14. Counselor Ismail El-Gawsaqi (from July 10, 1986 to July 8, 1997)
15. Major General Mohamed Abdel Salam Mahgoub (from July 9, 1997 to August 28, 2006)
16. General Adel Labib (from August 2006 to February 2011)
17. Dr. Essam Salem (from April 3, 2011 to July 2011)
18. Dr. Osama Foley (from August 4, 2011 to July 2012)
19. Counselor Mohamed Atta Abbas (from September 4, 2012 to June 1, 2013)
20. Counselor Maher Mohamed Zahir Baybars (from June 16, 2013 to August 12, 2013)
21. General Tarek Mahdy (from August 13, 2013 to February 6, 2015)
22. Mr. Hany El-Mesiry (from February 7, 2015 to October 25, 2015)
23. Engineer Mohamed Ahmed Abd-El-Zaher (from December 26, 2015 to September 7, 2016)
24. General Reda Mohamed Farahat (from September 9, 2016 to February 16, 2017)
25. Dr. Mohamed Ali Sultan (from February 16, 2017 to August 30, 2018)
26. Dr. Abdul Aziz Qansua (from August 30, 2018 to July 2024)
27. Ahmed Khaled Hassan Saeed (from July 2024 to February 2026)
28. Eng. Ayman Mohammed Ibrahim Ahmed Ateyya (present)

== Transportation ==
=== Ports ===
- Alexandria Port
- Al Dekheila Port
- Abu Qir Port
- Eastern Port

=== Railroads ===
- Alexandria Tram
- Alexandria Railways
- Alexandria Metro

=== Airports ===
- Alexandria International Airport (Egypt)
