= Amore e ginnastica =

- Directed by: Luigi Filippo D'Amico
- Written by: Suso Cecchi d'Amico; Tullio Pinelli; Luigi Filippo D'Amico
- Based on: Love and Gymnastics by Edmondo De Amicis
- Cinematography: Marcello Gatti
- Music by: Armando Trovajoli
- Release date: 1973
- Country: Italy
- Language: Italian

Amore e ginnastica (Love And Gymnastics) is a 1973 comedy film directed by Luigi Filippo D'Amico. It is based on a novel with the same name written by Edmondo De Amicis.

== Cast ==
- Lino Capolicchio: Simone Celzani
- Senta Berger: Maria Pedani
- Adriana Asti: Elena Zibelli
- Antonino Faà di Bruno: commendator Celzani
- Renzo Marignano: Ingegner Ginoni
- Benjamin Lev: Alfredo Ginoni
- Aldo Massasso: Armando (maestro Fassi)
- Rocco D'Assunta: Director of the school
- Ester Carloni: Pinuccia (the Celzani house maid)
- Solvejg D'Assunta: Elvira Fassi
- Edoardo Toniolo: the minister
- Maria Teresa Albani
- Wilma D'Eusebio
- Vincenzo Donzelli
- Giuliano Todeschini
- Giuseppe Alotta
- Valeria Sabel
- Francesco Sormano
- Edda Ferronao
- Bruna Cealti
- Sandro Tuminelli
