= List of botanical gardens in Egypt =

This is a list of botanical gardens in Egypt.

Garden	Location	Established	Notes & images
Agricultural Museum	Cairo	1937	
Ain Shams University Faculty of Science	Cairo	1953	
Alexandria University Faculty of Science	Alexandria	1942	
Antoniadis Garden	Alexandria	1860	
Aswan Botanical Garden	El Nabatat Island 24°05′37″N 32°54′13″E	1928	
Azbakeya Gardens	Cairo	1867	
Cairo University Faculty of Agriculture	Giza	1947	
El Nozha Garden	Alexandria	300 BC	
El Saff Botanic Garden	Cairo		
Feryal	Aswan	1944	
Gezirah Palace Gardens	Gezira Island		Now part of the Cairo Marriott Hotel
Giza Zoo	Giza	1890	
Japanese Botanical Garden	Cairo	1917	
Koubbeh Palace	Cairo	1960	
Manial Palace and Museum	Rhoda Island	1899-1929	
Muntazah Garden	Alexandria	1900s	
Orman Garden	Giza	1875	
Rose Garden	Alexandria	1928	
Sabahia Horticultural Research Station	Alexandria	1958	
Shallalat Gardens	Alexandria	Roman period	
Shehab Mazhar Barageel Garden	Cairo		
Shubra Palace	Cairo	1806	
Zohria Trial Gardens	Cairo	1868	
