= Love and Gymnastics =

1891 novella by Edmondo De Amicis

- Author: Edmondo De Amicis
- Original title: Amore e ginnastica
- Language: Italian
- Publisher: Nuova Antologia; Fratelli Treves
- Publication date: January–July 1891
- Publication place: Italy
- Pages: 141

Love and Gymnastics (Italian: Amore e ginnastica) is an 1891 novella by the Italian writer Edmondo De Amicis. It is set in Turin and follows a man who falls in love with and tries to seduce a female gymnastics teacher, but is continuously rejected because she does not want to be distracted from spreading Emilio Baumann's ideas about physical education.

The story was published in the magazine Nuova Antologia from January to July 1891. It was included in the 1892 volume Fra scuola e casa.

It was the basis for the 1973 film Amore e ginnastica, directed by Luigi Filippo D'Amico.
