= Saba Pasha =

Saba Pasha سابا باشا
- Location in Egypt
- Coordinates: 31.235665°N 29.957221°E
- Country: Egypt
- Governorate: Alexandria
- City: Alexandria
- Time zone: UTC+2 (EET)
  - Summer (DST): UTC+3 (EEST)

Saba Pasha (Arabic: سابا باشا) is a neighborhood in Alexandria, Egypt.

== See also ==
- Neighborhoods in Alexandria
