= Il domestico =

1974 film

- Film poster
- Directed by: Luigi Filippo D'Amico
- Written by: Sandro Continenza; Raimondo Vianello
- Starring: Lando Buzzanca
- Cinematography: Alessandro D'Eva
- Edited by: Renato Cinquini
- Music by: Piero Umiliani
- Release date: 4 October 1974
- Running time: 94 minutes
- Country: Italy
- Language: Italian

Il domestico is a 1974 Italian comedy film directed by Luigi Filippo D'Amico. It was shown as part of a retrospective on Italian comedy at the 67th Venice International Film Festival.

== Cast ==
- Lando Buzzanca as Rosario Cabaduni, called 'Sasa'
- Martine Brochard as Rita
- Arnoldo Foà as Engineer Ambrogio Perigatti
- Femi Benussi as Lola Mandragali
- Leonora Fani as Martina Perigatti
- Paolo Carlini as Andrea Donati
- Enzo Cannavale as Salvatore Sperato
- Erika Blanc as Silvana
- Malisa Longo as Esther
- Silvia Monti as The Lesbian Wife
- Renzo Marignano as The Gay Husband
- Luciano Salce as The Film Director
- Gordon Mitchell as General Von Werner
- Antonino Faà di Bruno as The Old Nobleman
- Camillo Milli as The Prison Governor
- Nanda Primavera as The Owner of the Brothel
