= Antonino Faà di Bruno =

Italian actor and military officer (1910–1981)

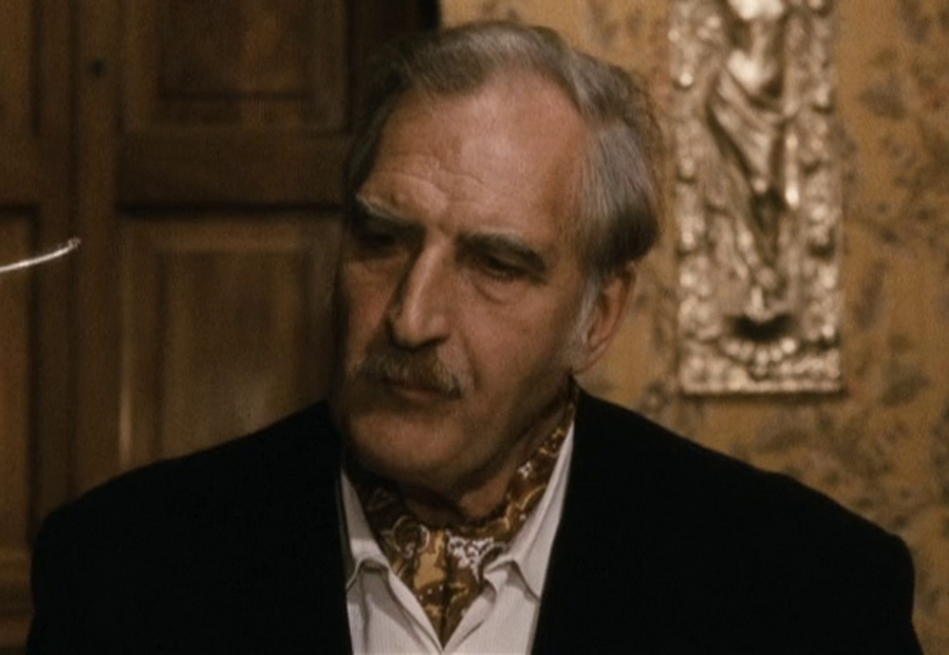
- Faà di Bruno in Alla mia cara mamma nel giorno del suo compleanno (1974)
- Born: 15 December 1910; London, UK
- Died: 2 May 1981 (aged 70); Alessandria, Italy
- Occupation: Actor
- Years active: 1964–1980
- Spouse: Anna Maria Andreini
- Children: 2

Antonino Faà di Bruno (15 December 1910 – 2 May 1981) was an Italian actor and former military officer.

== Biography ==
A member of the aristocratic Faà di Bruno family, Antonino Faà di Bruno was born in London, the son of Marchese Alessandro Faà di Bruno (who was the Italian consul in London at that time) and of his wife Fanny Costì. He was named after his namesake ancestor, Antonino Faà di Bruno (1762–1829), who was Bishop of Asti in the 19th century.

He took up a military career, becoming a lieutenant in the grenadiers and fighting in Italian East Africa. After his retirement in 1964, with the rank of Brigadier General, Faà di Bruno started a career as an actor, working with Carlo Lizzani (La vita agra), Pier Paolo Pasolini (Pigsty), Vittorio De Sica (Lo chiameremo Andrea), Billy Wilder (Avanti!), Federico Fellini (Amarcord), Luciano Salce (Alla mia cara mamma nel giorno del suo compleanno), Mario Monicelli (We Want the Colonels).

Tall at 1.96 metres (6 ft 5 in), with a baritone voice and an aristocratic bearing, Antonino Faà di Bruno was often cast in roles of high rank, nobleman, officers and members of the ruling class. He performed as a character actor in several commedia all'italiana films, and became known for playing the role of retired Lt.Col. Vittorio Emanuele Ribaud, who attempted a coup d'état in We Want the Colonels, and of the Duke-Count Piercarlo Semenzara in Il secondo tragico Fantozzi.

== Personal life and death ==
In 1947, he married the widow of his cousin Emilio Faà di Bruno who had died in 1943, Anna Maria Andreini. He later adopted their daughters, Camilla and Costanza.

Away from his public life, he enjoyed dwelling in the countryside of Istia d'Ombrone.

He died at 70 following complications from a traumatic brain injury that he suffered after being hit by a bus.

== Filmography ==
| Year | Title | Role | Notes |
|---|---|---|---|
| 1964 | La vita agra | | Uncredited |
| 1969 | Porcile | Old man (scene of the Sentence) | Uncredited |
| 1972 | Lo chiameremo Andrea | Schoolmaster | |
| 1972 | Avanti! | Concierge | |
| 1973 | We Want the Colonels | Lt. Col. Vittorio Emanuele Ribaud | |
| 1973 | Dirty Weekend | Count Antonino Marlotti | Uncredited |
| 1973 | Deaf Smith & Johnny Ears | The Senator | |
| 1973 | Amarcord | Count | |
| 1973 | Amore e ginnastica | Commendator Censani | |
| 1974 | Alla mia cara mamma nel giorno del suo compleanno | Zio Alberto | |
| 1974 | Il domestico | The Old Nobleman | |
| 1974 | City Under Siege | Col. Peretti | |
| 1975 | White Horses of Summer | Receptionist | |
| 1975 | Un sac de billes | Le vieux beau | |
| 1975 | The Sunday Woman | Paolo Campi | |
| 1976 | Pure as a Lily | Don Gerlando | |
| 1976 | Il secondo tragico Fantozzi | Mega Direttore Clamoroso, Duke Count Piercarlo Semenzara | |
| 1977 | L'appuntamento | Ermengardo Braghidoni | |
| 1977 | Bobby Deerfield | Vincenzo | |
| 1978 | The Soldier with Great Maneuvers | Gen. Barattoli | |
| 1980 | Strawberry Blonde | | |
| 1981 | Una vacanza bestiale | Console | |
| 1981 | Il minestrone | The marquis | (final film role) |
