= Renzo Marignano =

Italian actor and film director (1923–1987)

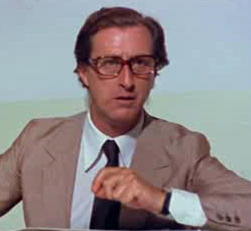
- Born: 26 March 1923; Genoa, Italy
- Died: 25 November 1987 (aged 64); Genoa, Italy
- Occupations: Actor, film director

Renzo Marignano (26 March 1923 – 25 November 1987), sometimes credited as Renzo Marignani, was an Italian actor and film director.

Born in Genoa, after World War II Marignano was one of the founders of Cimofilm, a production company specialized in documentaries, some of which he also directed. In 1958 he moved to Rome where he started a career as character actor, appearing in a large number of films. He also was assistant director for several films by Pietro Germi and Mario Monicelli.

== Selected filmography ==
- Divorce Italian Style (1961) as politician
- La vita agra (1964) as Swiss man (uncredited)
- Countersex (1964) as Corrado Fracassi (segment "Cocaina di domenica"; uncredited)
- Made in Italy (1965) as the snob (segment "1 'Usi e costumi', episode 1")
- Pleasant Nights (1966) as friend of Luca
- Fantabulous Inc. (1967) as the director of commercial
- Caprice Italian Style (1968) as the car driver (segment "Perche") / principe consorte (segment "Viaggio di lavoro")
- Operation Snafu (1970) as episode
- Il trapianto (1970) as the tall Envoy of the Weisses-Kreuz Klinik
- The Divorce (1970) as Marco
- Dorian Gray (1970) as pornografic editor (uncredited)
- Brancaleone at the Crusades (1970) as Finogamo
- Belle d'amore (1970) as Industriale (uncredited)
- The Blonde in the Blue Movie (1971) as Gustav Larsen
- That's How We Women Are (1971) as guest of Alberta with recorder (segment "Il mondo cammina")
- Four Flies on Grey Velvet (1971) as funeral exhibition attendant (uncredited)
- Il provinciale (1971) as friend of Giulia
- Without Family (1972) as Cesare Maccaresi (uncredited)
- Seven Murders for Scotland Yard (1972) as inspector Henry Campbell
- Alfredo, Alfredo (1972) as the Doctor
- Life Is Tough, Eh Providence? (1972) as the priest
- Fiorina la vacca (1972) as man of Beolco
- Canterbury n° 2 - Nuove storie d'amore del '300 (1973) as Innkeeper (uncredited)
- We Want the Colonels (1973) as Lt. Commander Teofilo Branzino
- Dirty Weekend (1973) as Franco
- Ming, ragazzi! (1973) as episode
- My Darling Slave (1973) as Corrado
- Mean Frank and Crazy Tony (1973) as Receiver
- Il brigadiere Pasquale Zagaria ama la mamma e la polizia (1973) as Under-secretary
- Patroclooo! E il soldato Camillone, grande grosso e frescone (1973) as Colonnello
- Amore e ginnastica (1973) as Giulio, suo padre
- High School Girl (1974) as Sonia's Father
- Il colonnello Buttiglione diventa generale (1974) as general John Ernest Dunn
- Il domestico (1974) as Giacomo
- Il trafficone (1974) as Count Everardo
- La bellissima estate (1974) as Pietro as the chauffeur
- Sex Pot (1975) as client of nightclub
- The Teasers (1975) as professor Mancinelli
- Il gatto mammone (1975) as urologist
- Eye of the Cat (1975) as Dinner Guest (uncredited)
- Rudeness (1975) as Lord Walley
- The Loves and Times of Scaramouche (1976) as Barber client
- A Common Sense of Modesty (1976) as 'Lady Chatterley' director
- The Con Artists (1976) as Tailor
- Due sul pianerottolo (1976) as tenant lover
- Death Rage (1976) as doctor
- Goodnight, Ladies and Gentlemen (1976) as TV Reporter in Milan (uncredited)
- Colpita da improvviso benessere (1976) as fish vendor
- Charleston (1977) as Morris
- Three Tigers Against Three Tigers (1977) as Il Marito Di Giada Nardi
- La presidentessa (1977) as Scottish tourist
- Concorde Affaire '79 (1979) as Martinez, Milland's Advisor
- Le Guignolo (1980) as le bijoutier
- Cannibal Apocalypse (1980) as Dr. Morris (uncredited)
- Sugar, Honey and Pepper (1980) as Aurelio Battistini
- Bankers Also Have Souls (1982) as hotel receptionist
- Yuppies (1986) as husband of Francesca
- Grandi magazzini (1986) as episode
- Dark Eyes (1987) as Il generale (final film role)
