= Orman Garden =

Botanical garden in Egypt

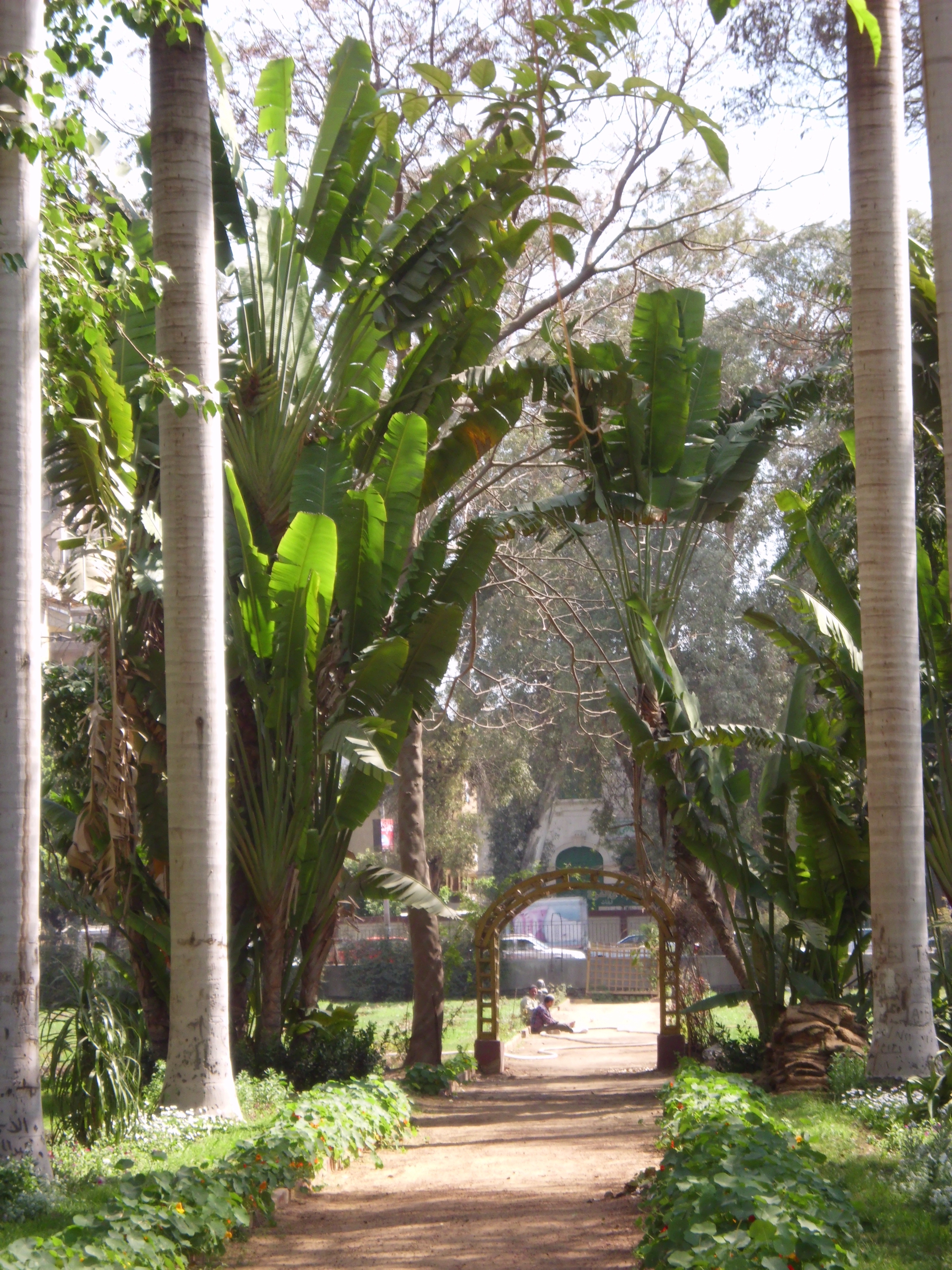
- A path in the garden
- Interactive map of Orman Garden
- Location: Giza Governorate, Cairo, Egypt
- Coordinates: 30°01′45″N 31°12′47″E
- Area: 20 acres (8.1 ha)
- Created: 1875
- Open: Yes

The Orman Garden at Giza, Cairo is one of the most famous Botanical gardens in Egypt. It was founded in 1875 during the reign of Khedive Isma'il Pasha. He established the garden on a larger site than it presently occupies as part of the Palace of the Khedive. A great lover of gardens, the Khedive entrusted the design of the garden to the French landscaper Jean-Pierre Barillet-Deschamps. It became a public botanical garden in 1910/1917 and put under the Ministry of Agriculture management.

The garden covers about 28 acres. Today, the garden contains a rock garden, a rose garden, cactus gardens, and probably the most notable feature, the lotus pond.

Orman Garden is west of the River Nile and east of Cairo University in the Giza Governorate. "Orman" is a Turkish word, which means "the forest". A small botanical museum attached to the garden shelters herbaria dating from the Ismail khedive and furniture from the king Farouk.

== Spring festival ==
Since 1920, the Orman Garden has hosted an annual spring floral exhibition. The Spring Festival usually starts in March every year and is an important Egyptian cultural event in spring. In 2021, it started on March 13. Officials from the ministry of agriculture open the exhibition. The spring fair usually lasts a month. During that time, many companies exhibit their various plant offerings including ornamental plants, cut flowers, cactus, seeds for growing many plants, fertilizers, gardening tools, and pots. In addition, local goods like woven baskets, Aswanian honey, essential oils, souvenirs, and jewelry can also be found at the exhibition. Prices for plants start from as low as 5 LE and rare varieties can reach thousands. Huge plant producers like Egypt Green (Safwat Habib) and sellers of clay pots from the Fustat Souq in Old Cairo participate in the exhibition.

== Special collections ==
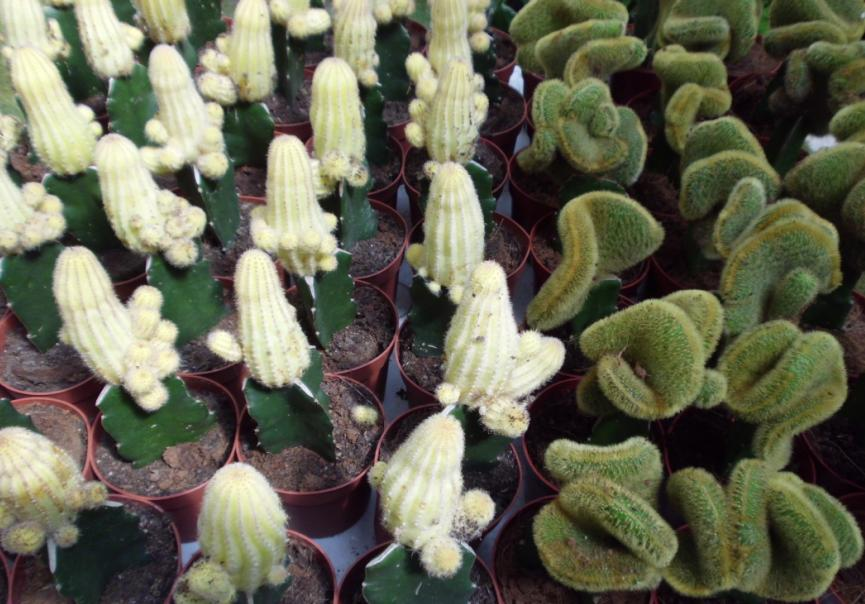
Cactus grafting.

Conifers, palms, cacti, succulents, roses, bamboo, ficus, aquatic plants, strelitzia

- Acacia nilotica wildex Delile, Tree
- Albizia lebbeck Benth, Tree
- Balanites aegyptiaca Pelile, Tree
- Cyperus papyrus Plant aquatic
- Hyphaene thebaica Mart., Palm
- Luffa aegyptiaca Auth, Climber

Orman Garden has a seed bank and publishes it own Index Seminum.

== Gallery ==
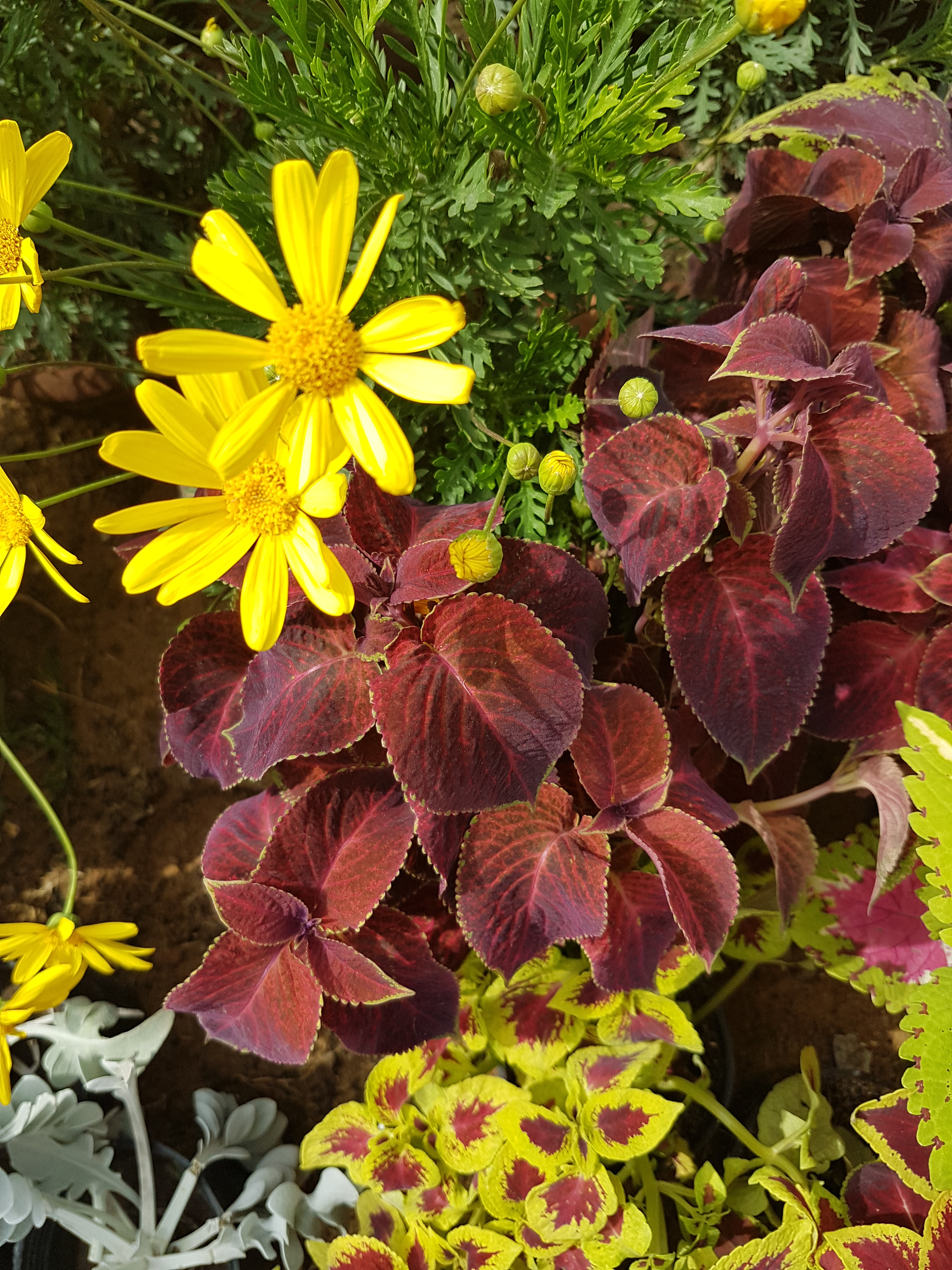

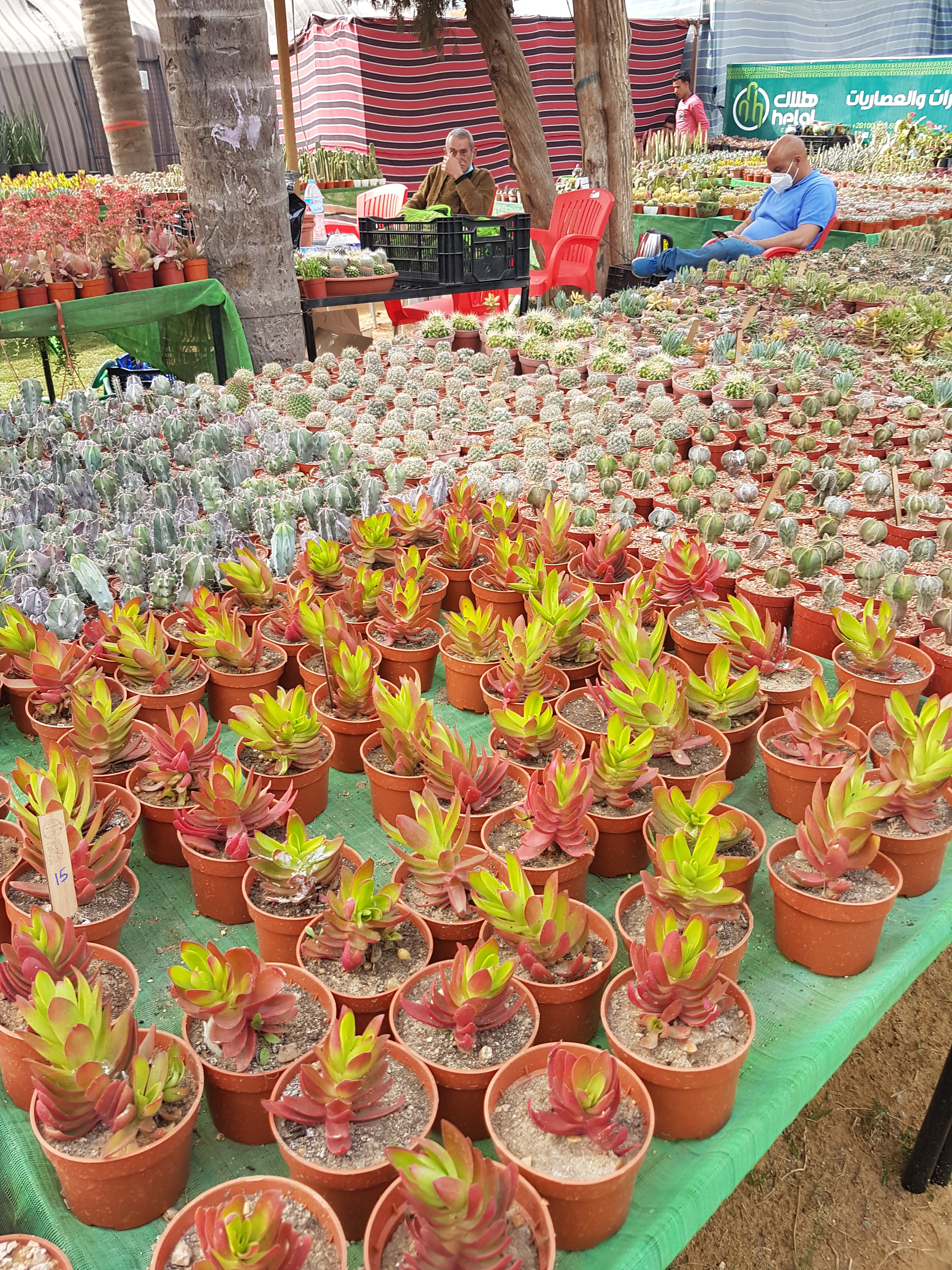
Cacti & Succulents at Orman

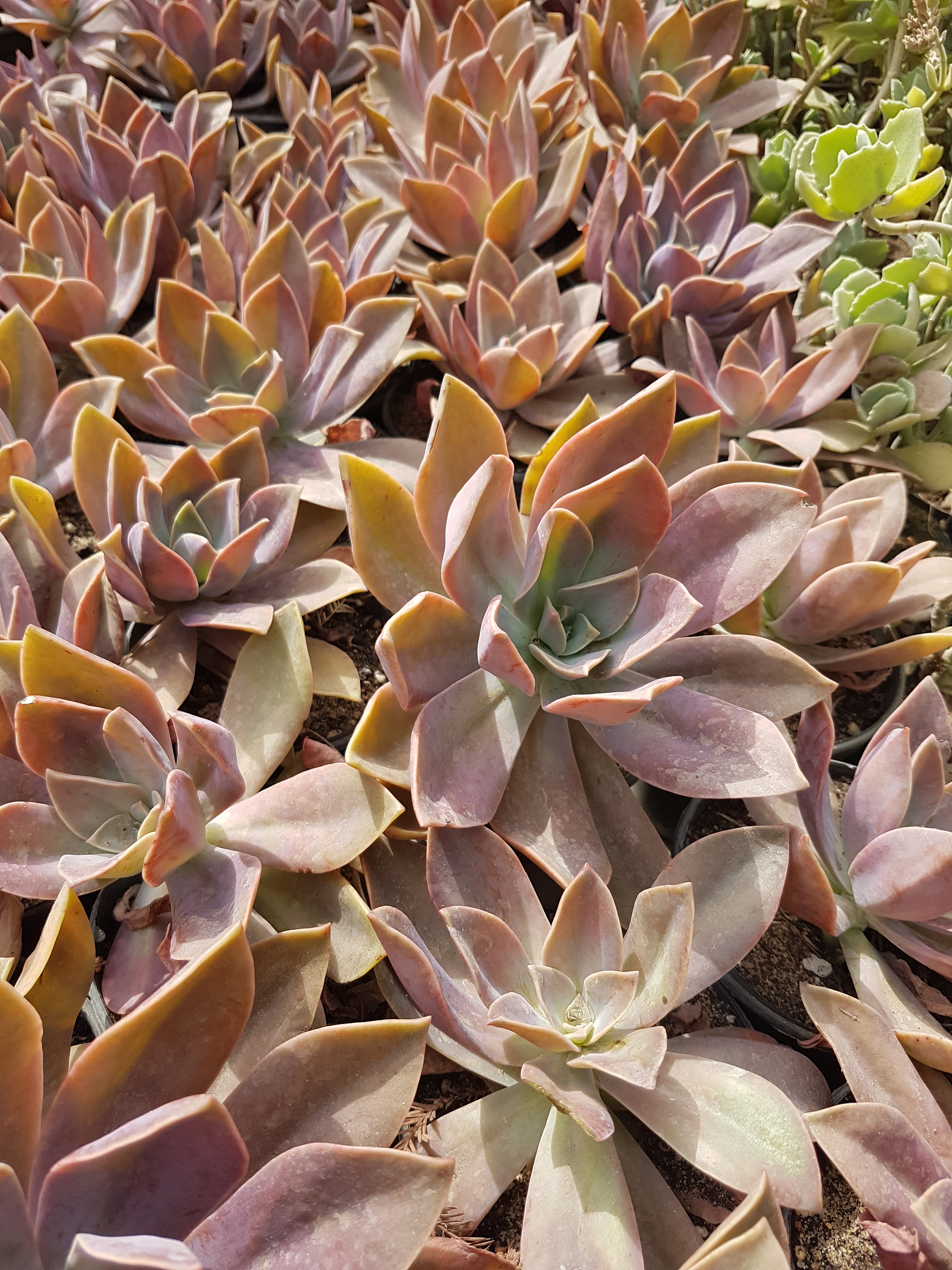
Rosette Succulents at Orman

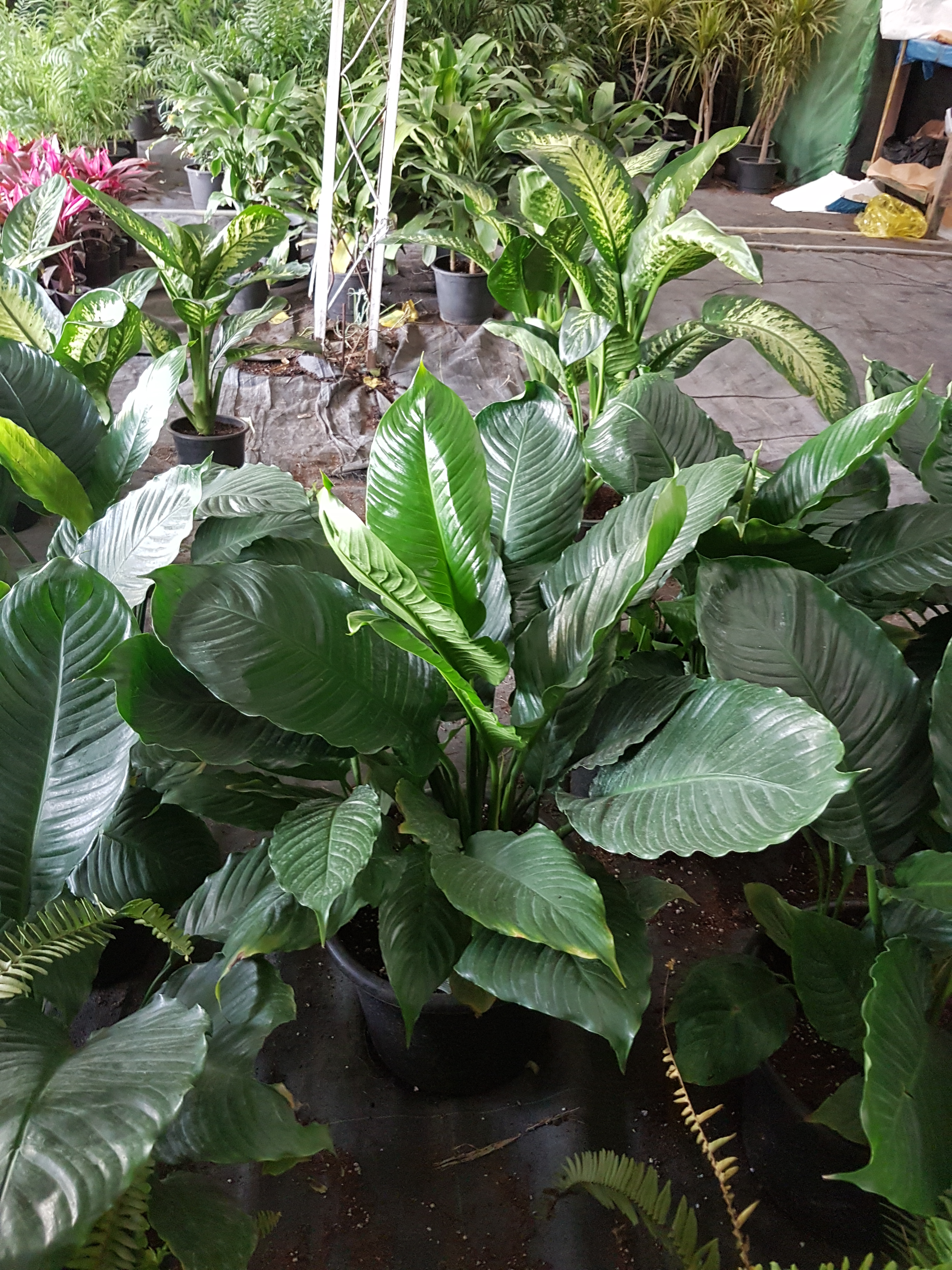
Peace Lily

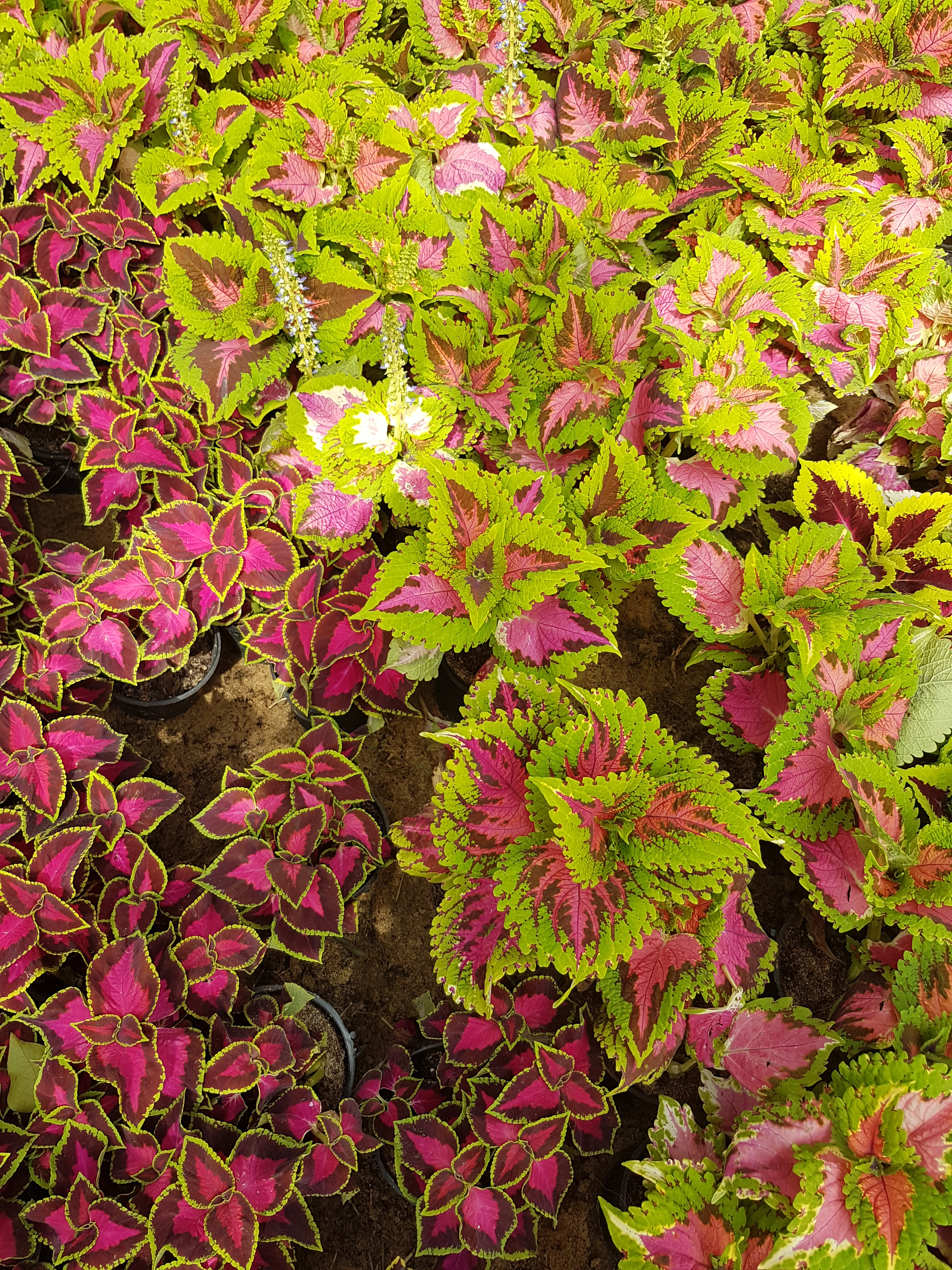
Coleus Plants

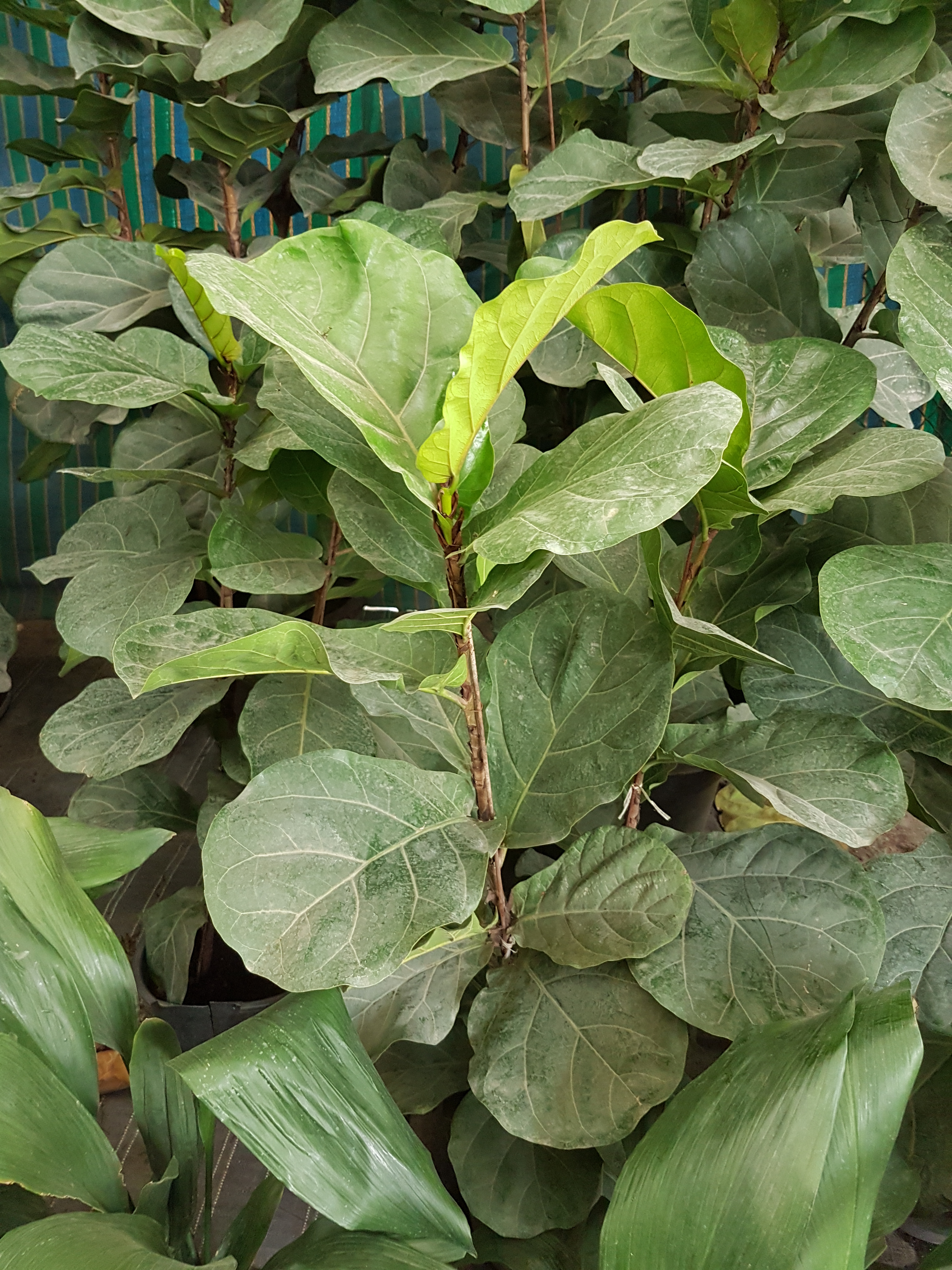
Fiddle leaf fig
