= Casa Coraggio, Bordighera =

Historic building in Liguria, Italy

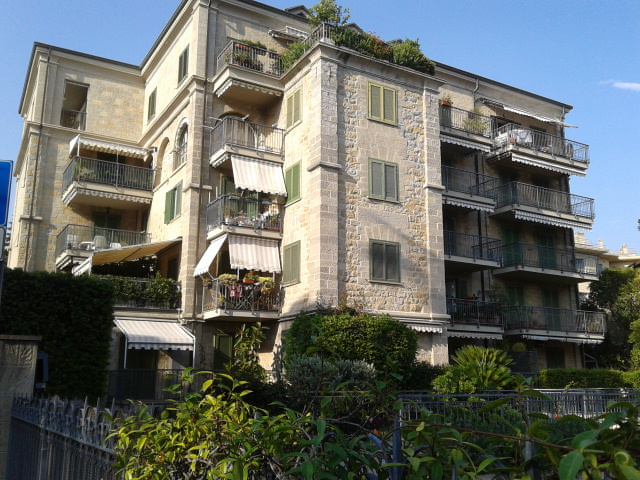
Casa Coraggio, facade

Casa Coraggio (c.d. 1880 CE) is one of the historic buildings of the city of Bordighera in Liguria, Italy. Built with stones, the 19th-century building is located at 34 Via Vittorio Veneto, at the latter's merge with Via Regina Vittoria. It is roughly between Chiesa Valdese and Chiesa Anglicana. (43.7813°N 7.6619°E)

== History ==
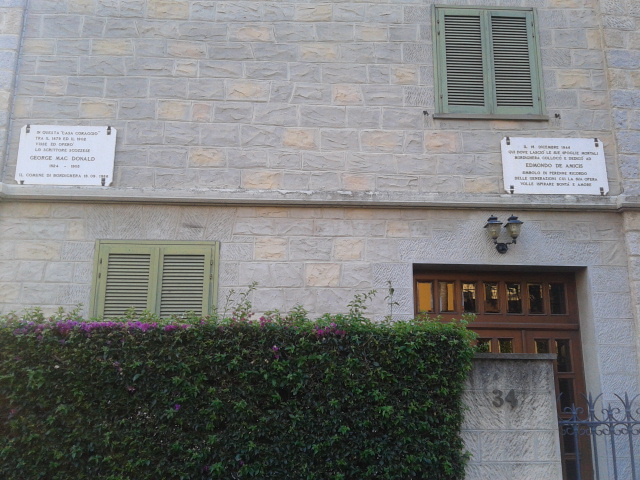
Casa Coraggio, memorial plaques for George MacDonald and Edmondo De Amicis

Around Christmas 1880, Scottish writer George MacDonald and his family moved to Casa Coraggio, which they had built with the help of financial donations from friends. The family lived there from October to May. They originally came to Italy when one of MacDonald's daughters, Mary, was ill with tuberculosis, as they believed the dry and warm climate would improve her chances of recovery. Although she died before the house was completed, the family continued spending winters in Italy because it greatly improved the health of MacDonald, who was prone to illness. The family even planted Scotch firs outside the house to remind them of Britain.

The vast living room could host as many as two hundred people, and it rapidly became a centre of the British community and the intellectual groups that resided in the area. MacDonald organised several entertainments like concerts and theatrical representations. Every Wednesday he presented and read aloud the verses of the best British poets of the time. All of this made his house an important cultural building in the city and it was named “Casa Coraggio” (Courage House) as a tribute to MacDonald’s motto: “Corage! God mend al”.

After MacDonald died, the house was sold and transformed into the Hôtel de la Reine, which was chosen by Edmondo De Amicis as a winter residence because of its historical links to MacDonald. De Amicis even wrote one of his “Pagine spiritose” in Bordighera, calling it the "Englishman’s paradise" (1903). Bordighera was also the place in which De Amicis died on 11 March 1908 due to a cerebral haemorrhage.

After the Second World War put an end to British and German tourism in Bordighera, the hotel went into a severe crisis from which it never recovered. It later closed and was transformed into an apartment block. On the façade one can see memorial plaques that remember both MacDonald and Amicis
