= We Want the Colonels =

1973 film

- DVD cover
- Directed by: Mario Monicelli
- Written by: Agenore Incrocci; Mario Monicelli; Furio Scarpelli
- Produced by: Pio Angeletti; Adriano De Micheli
- Starring: Ugo Tognazzi
- Cinematography: Alberto Spagnoli
- Edited by: Lorenzo Baraldi
- Music by: Carlo Rustichelli
- Release date: 5 March 1973
- Running time: 105 minutes
- Country: Italy
- Language: Italian

We Want the Colonels (Italian: Vogliamo i colonnelli) is a 1973 Italian comedy film directed by Mario Monicelli. It was entered in the 1973 Cannes Film Festival. It is a satire of the attempted far-right Borghese Coup.

== Plot ==
Giuseppe Tritoni is a parliament member from Livorno by a far-right party and despite disagreeing with his comrades he decides to organize a coup d'état, which however is foiled by the Minister of the Interior, Li Masi, which organizes another one in his turn. Tritoni then tries to kidnap the president of the republic but the latter loses his life due to a heart attack and Li Masi is seen by the Italian people as the potential savior of the homeland. Tritoni will eventually surrender, but his plans will be recycled in some African countries.

== Cast ==
- Ugo Tognazzi as Giuseppe Tritoni
- Tino Bianchi as On. Mazzante
- Claude Dauphin as President of Italy
- Duilio Del Prete as Mons. Giampaolino Sartorello
- Antonino Faà di Bruno as Col. Vittorio Emanuele Ribaud
- Vincenzo Falanga as Ciccio Introna
- Gian Carlo Fusco as Col. Gavino Furas
- Barbara Herrera as Amelia D'Amatrice
- Giuseppe Maffioli as Col. Pino Barbacane
- Renzo Marignano as Ten. Branzino
- Camillo Milli as Col. Elpidio Aguzzo
- François Périer as On. Di Cori
- Lino Puglisi as On. Salvato Li Masi
- Gianni Solaro as On. Cicero
- Carla Tatò as Marcella Bassi Lega
- Pietro Tordi as Gen. Bassi Lega
- Stavros Tornes
- Max Turilli as Col. Quintiliano Turzilli
- Pino Zac as Armando Caffè
