= Karmoz =

Karmoz كرموز
- Location in Egypt
- Coordinates: 31.177266°N 29.896874°E
- Country: Egypt
- Governorate: Alexandria
- City: Alexandria
- Time zone: UTC+2 (EST)

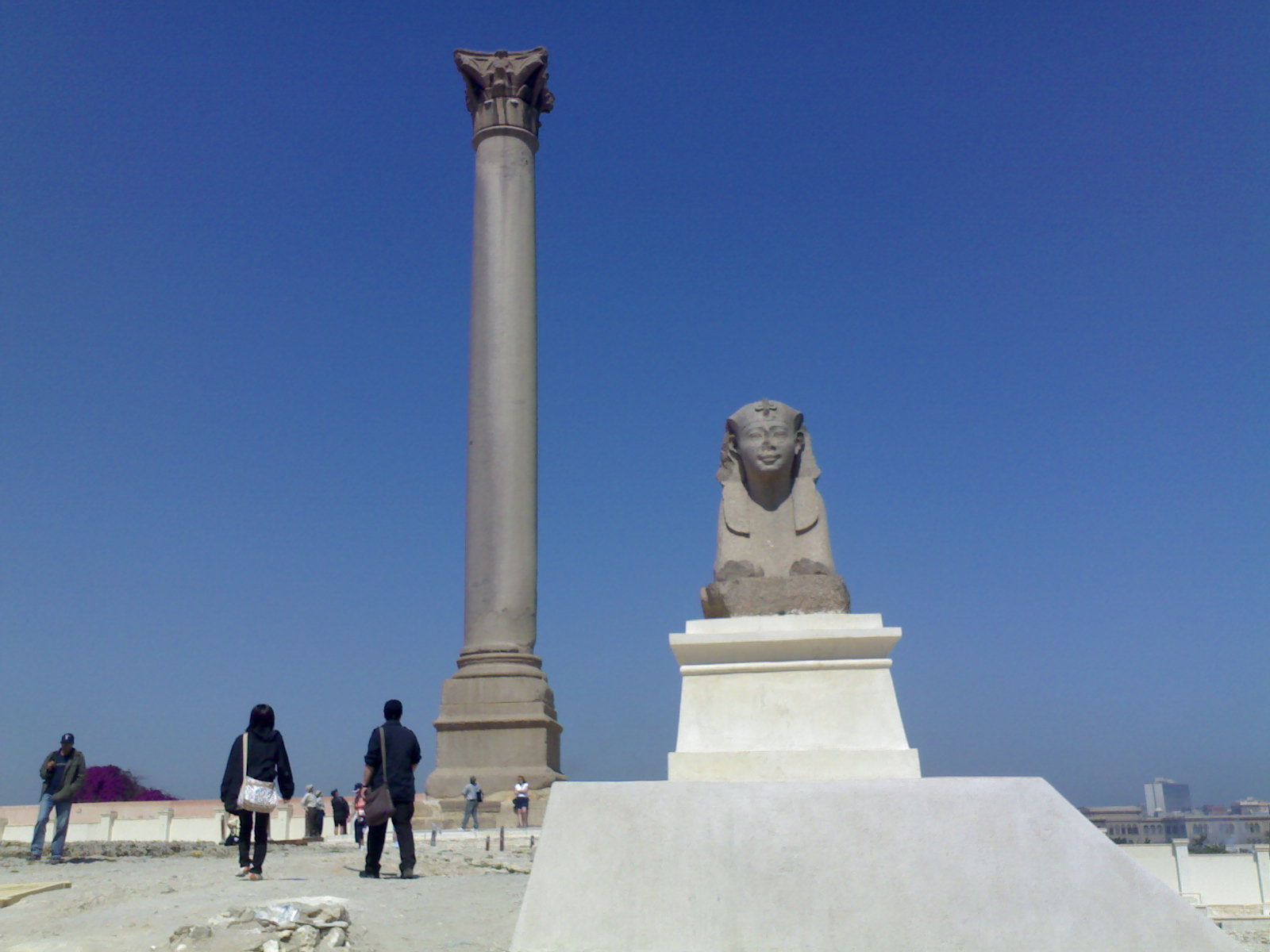
Pompey’s Pillar, Alexandria

Karmoz (Arabic: كرموز) is a neighborhood in Alexandria, Egypt. Karmoz is considered the oldest district in Alexandria and is the origin of the city itself. It is the site of the ancient village of Rhacotis.

Karmoz is located in the center of Alexandria and is a popular area with several tourist attractions, the most important of which is Pompey's Pillar on the site of the ancient Serapeum Temple hill, which was built during the Roman era around 292 AD to celebrate the arrival of Diocletian to Egypt. It also contains the catacombs of Kom El Shoqafa, which also date back to the Roman era in the city.

== See also ==
- Neighborhoods in Alexandria
