= Jean-Pierre Barillet-Deschamps =

French horticulturist and landscape architect

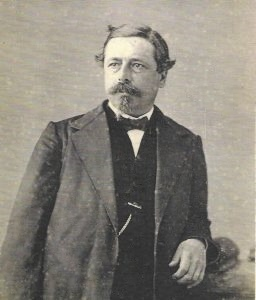

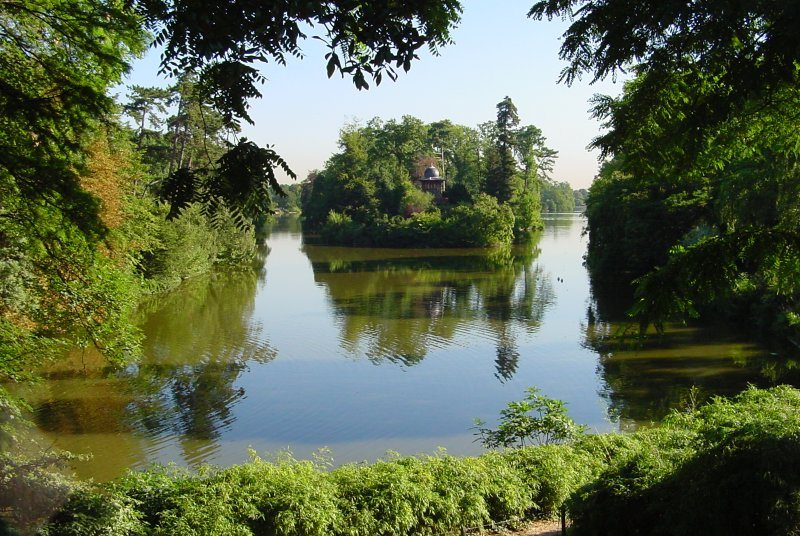
A landscape in the Bois de Boulogne created by chief gardener Jean-Pierre Barillet-Deschamps

Jean-Pierre Barillet-Deschamps (7 June 1824 at Saint-Antoine-du-Rocher – 12 September 1873 at Vichy) was a French horticulturist and landscape architect. He was the chief gardener of Paris during the reign of Emperor Napoleon III, and was responsible for planting the great gardens of the French Second Empire; the Bois de Boulogne, the Bois de Vincennes, Parc Montsouris, Parc des Buttes-Chaumont, the remaking of the Luxembourg Garden, and many smaller Parisian parks and gardens. He was also responsible for planting trees along the new boulevards of Paris. His landscape gardens, with their lakes, winding paths, sloping lawns, groves of exotic trees and flower beds, had a large influence on public parks throughout Europe and in the United States.

== Early life and career ==
Barillet-Deschamps was born in 1824, the son of a gardener. His first job in 1841 was as a monitor and teacher in a revolutionary new kind of prison colony called "La Paternelle," founded near Tours in 1839, where the prisoners learned farming and gardening. From there he went to Bordeaux, where he started a gardening enterprise, and met Baron Haussmann, then the Prefect of the Gironde Department. He also met Jean-Charles Adolphe Alphand, an engineer who worked for Haussmann.

== Move to Paris ==
When the Emperor Napoleon III brought Haussmann to Paris to be the new Prefect of the Seine Department, Haussmann summoned both Alphand and Barillet-Deschamps to Paris. The Emperior had conceived a plan to create large new parks around Paris, to provide green space and recreation for the rapidly growing population of the city. He named Alphand as the head of the new Service des Promenades et Plantations de Paris, and Alphand chose Barillet-Deschamps as the first jardinier en chef, or Chief Gardener of Paris. Barillet-Deschamps worked in close collaboration with Alphand, the engineer Eugene Belgrand (1810-1870), who was charged with providing water to the new parks, and with the architect Gabriel Davioud, who designed all the structures in the parks.

=== Major parks in Paris ===
Under Alphand's guidance, Barillet-Deschamps created the landscapes of the Bois de Boulogne and the Bois de Vincennes, and then the Luxembourg Garden as it appears today; Parc Monceau; the Parc des Buttes Chaumont; and Parc Montsouris. The scale of the projects was gigantic: For the Bois de Boulogne alone, he planted 420,000 trees and seeded 273 hectares of lawns, using 150 kilograms of seed per hectare. To provide trees, shrubs and flowers for the park, he had gardens and greenhouses built near the racetrack of Longchamps, and at Auteuil. He created another garden at Petit-Bry, on the banks of the Marne River, specially to grow trees to line the boulevards of Paris. At Vincennes, near the fortifications of Paris, he planted another garden especially for cultivating ornamental plants.

=== Plant propagation ===
At Passy, close to the Parc de la Muette, he built another complex of greenhouses, called the Fleuriste de la Muette, especially for flowers and exotic plants. This complex was composed of thirty greenhouses, lit with gas lights, each with its own conditions devoted to different varieties of plants. One group of greenhouses was filled entirely with thousands of fuchsia, chrysanthemum, canna, pelagorium, verveine, calceolaira, and ageratum plants. Individual greenhouses were built to grow palm trees, ficus, camellias, solanum, Caladium, and begonias; and others for banana trees, hibiscus, ferns and other highly specialized plants. There were nearly three million plants in the greenhouses of the Fleuriste de la Muette, tended by about one hundred gardeners.

=== Lining Parisian streets with trees ===
In addition to the large new gardens around the edges of Paris, Barillet-Dechamps was responsible for providing trees to line the newly built avenues that Baron Haussmann was building. A line of holes each three meters wide and one meter deep was dug along each side each boulevard. His gardeners used specially equipped carts, each of which carried one tree. Each cart carrying a tree was positioned over the hole and carefully lowered it into place. The trees came from the garden that Barille-Deschamps had built along the Marne for that purpose. The trees used most often were chestnut trees and platane trees, which Haussmann himself preferred he had seen rows of plantanes in Provence when he was Prefect of the Department of the Var, and he admired their wide leaves and the shade they gave. By 1868, Barillet-Deschamps had planted 102,154 trees along the boulevards of Paris.

== International travels and death ==
Barillet-Deschamps traveled widely to advise other cities on their gardens. He helped in the design of gardens in Marseille, in Turin, in Belgium, in Austria, in Prussia, in Turkey, and in Egypt. He began working on a garden for the Khedive of Egypt in 1873, and was still working on it when he became ill, returned to France, and died in Vichy in 1873 at the age of fifty.

== Gardens landscaped by Barillet-Deschamps ==
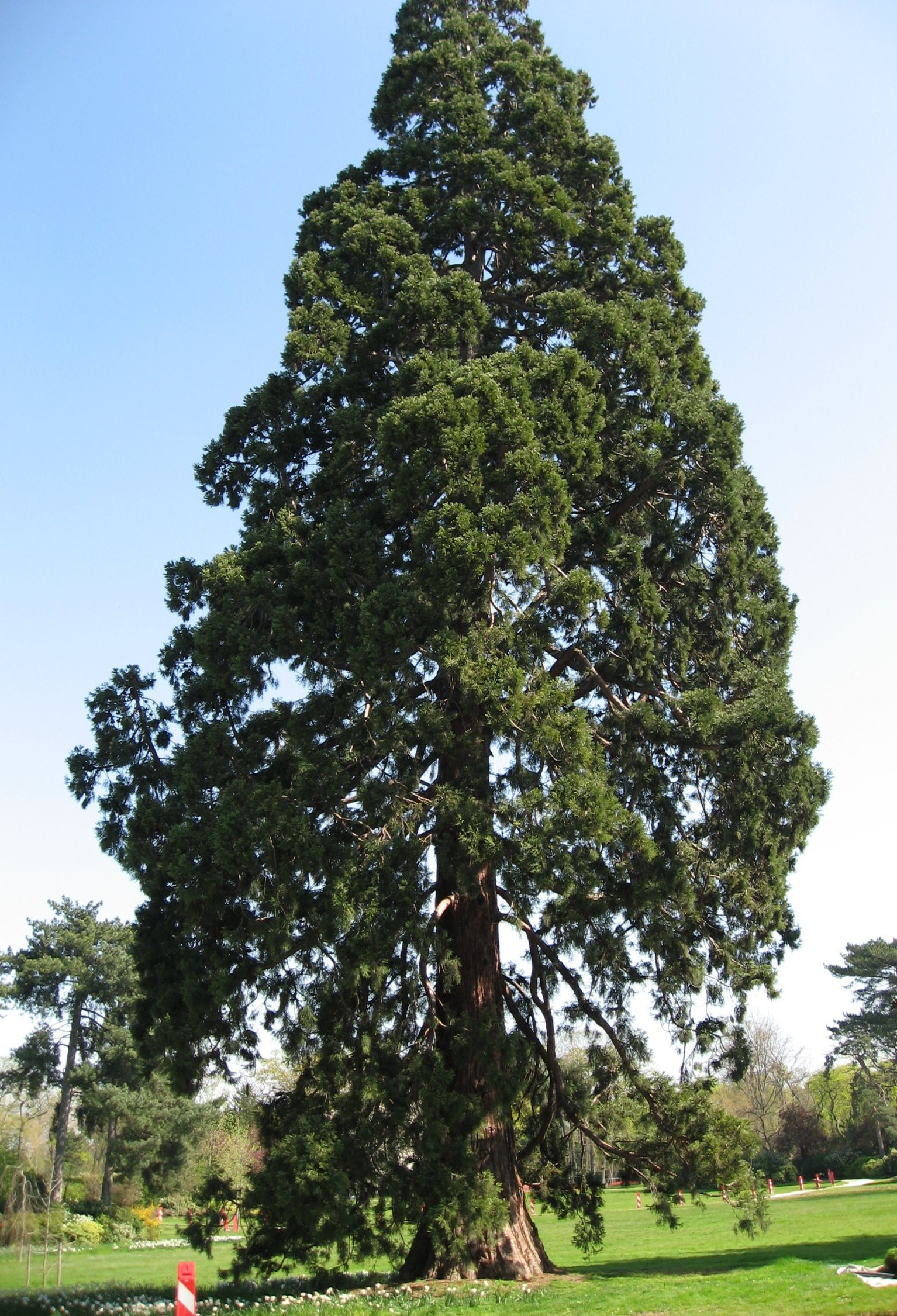
A giant sequoia tree (Sequoiadendron giganteum) planted in the Pre-Catalan in the Bois de Boulogne (1852-1858).

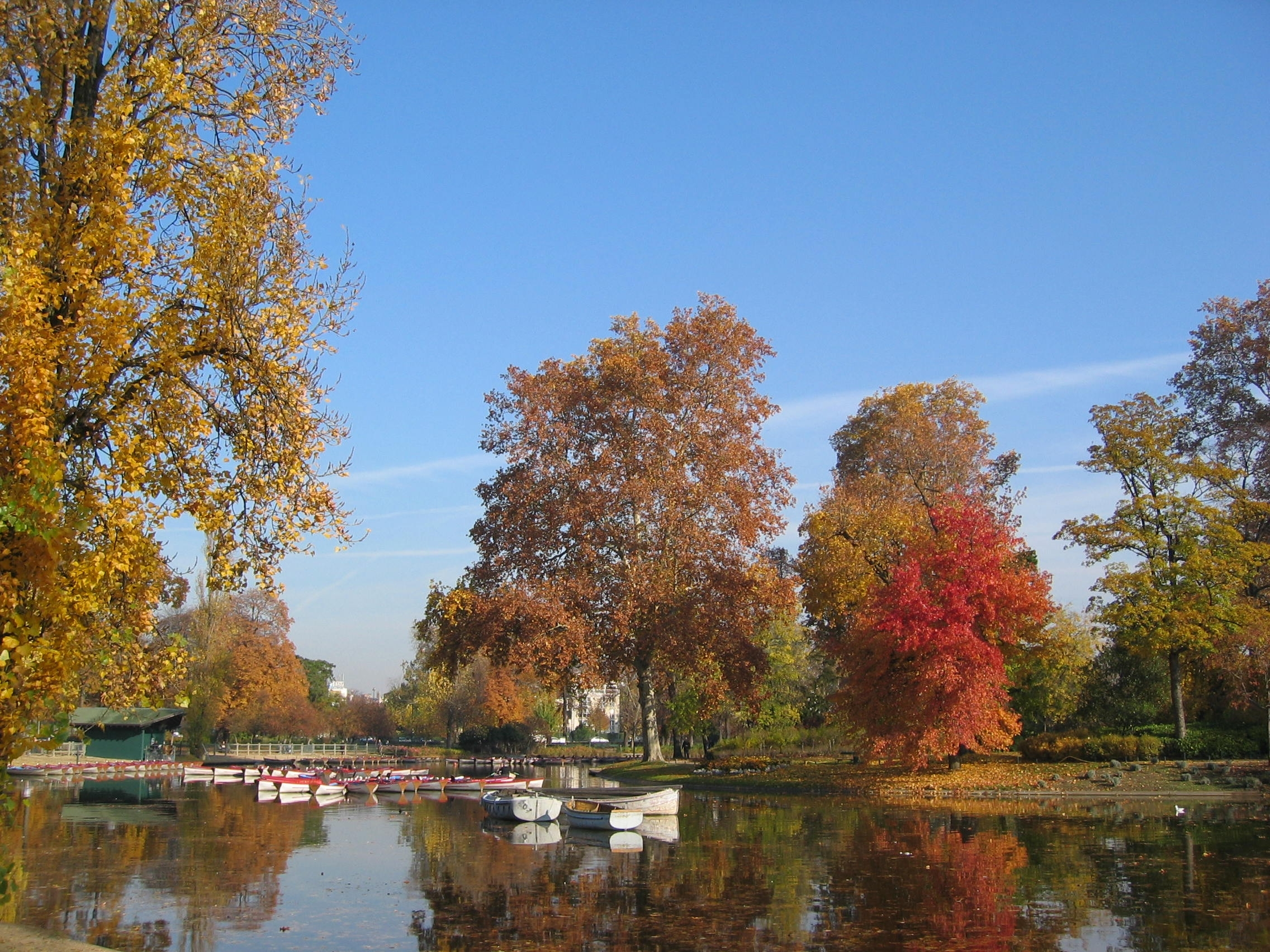
The Bois de Vincennes, (1855-1866)

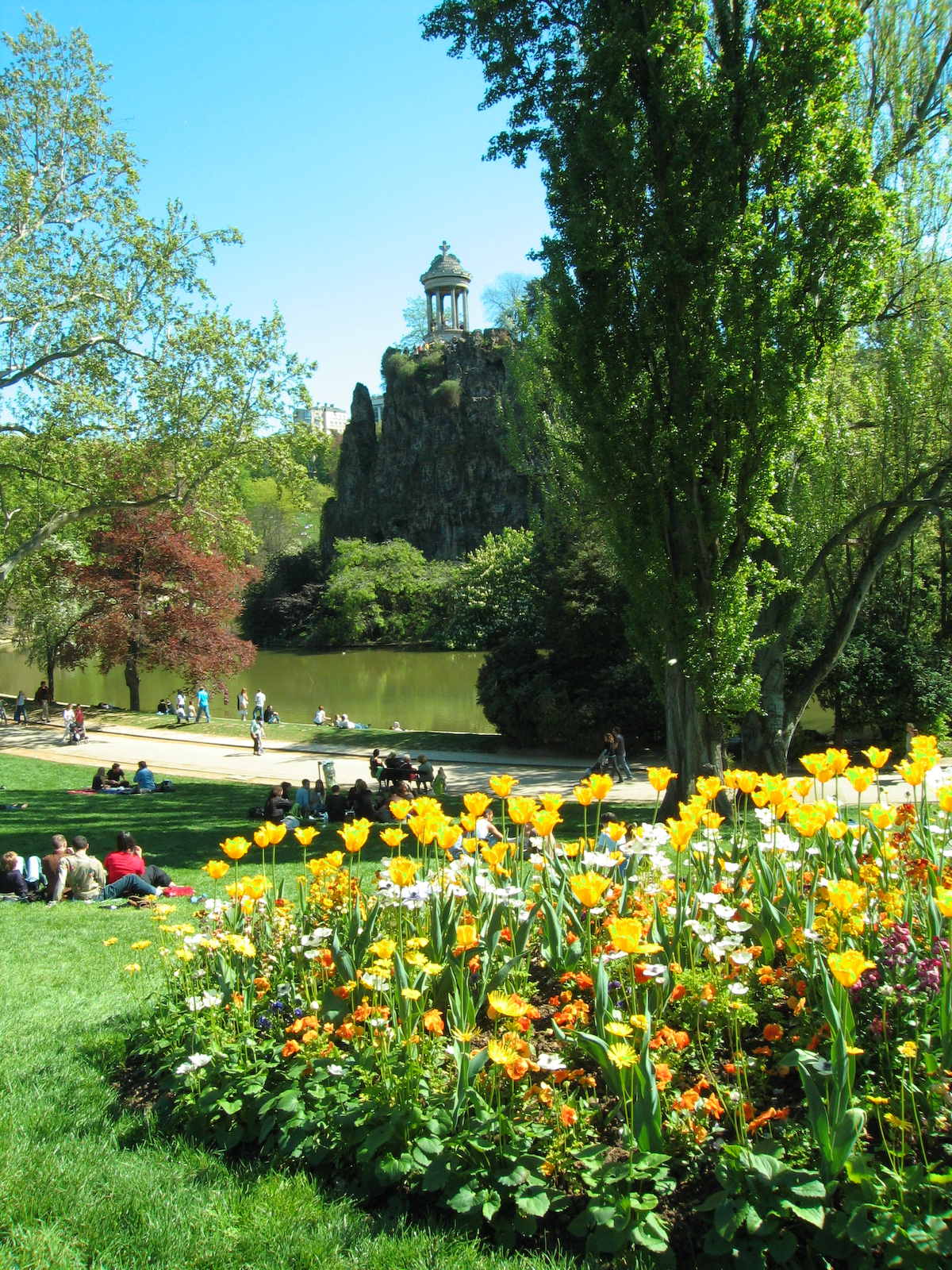
The Parc des Buttes Chaumont, (1864-1867)

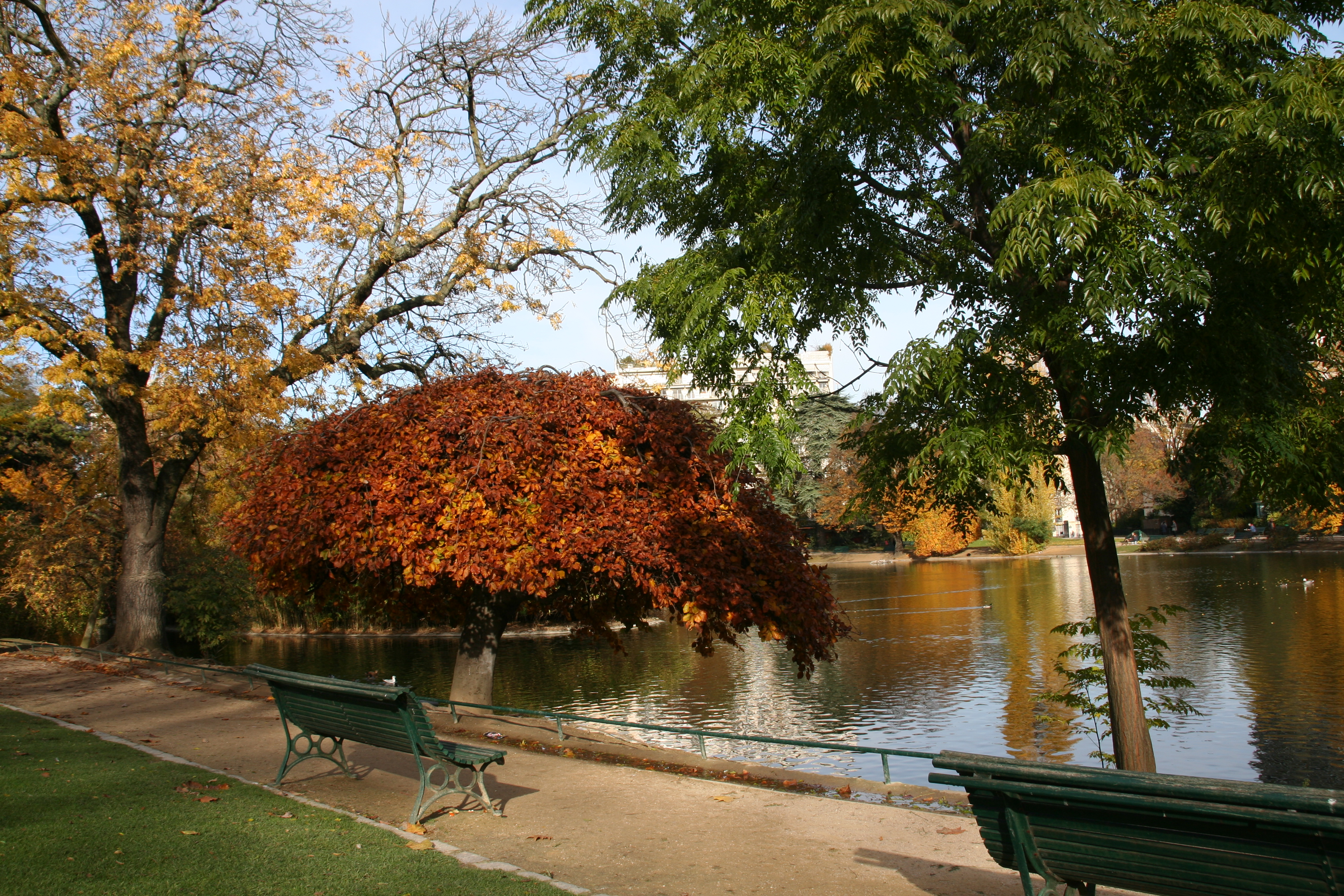
Weeping beech trees in Parc Montsouris, (1867-1869)

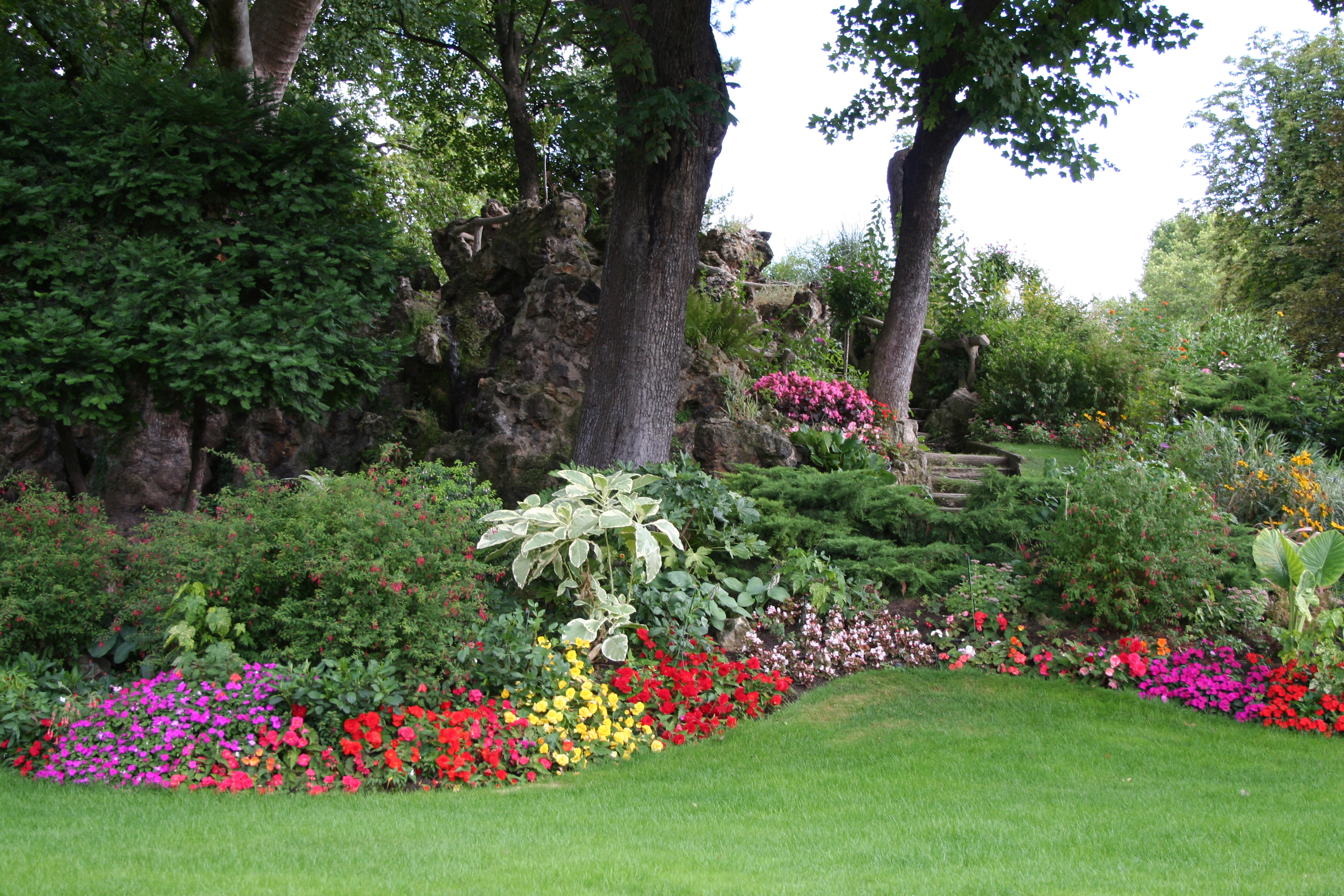
Flowerbeds in Parc Monceau, (1860-1861)

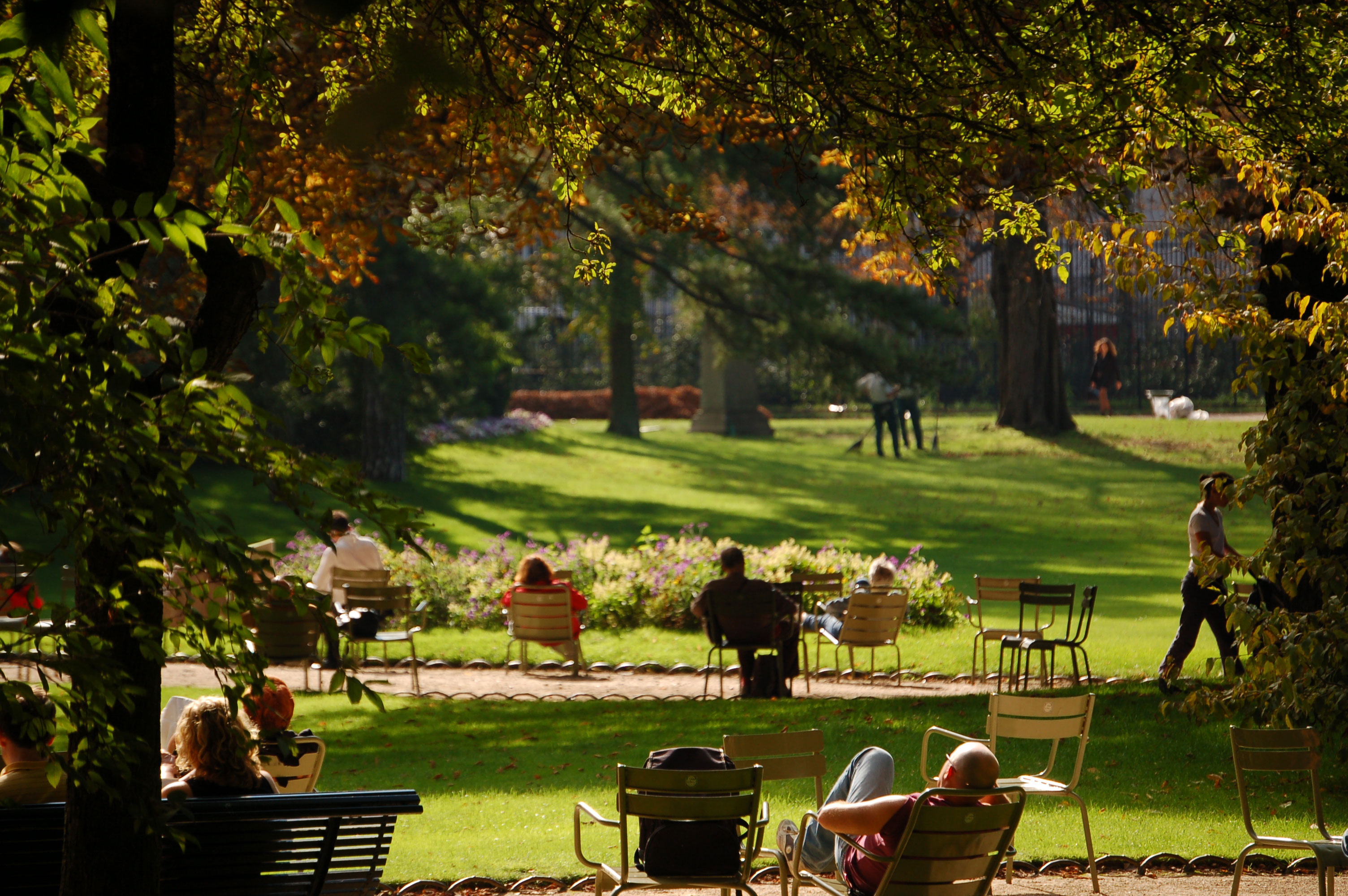
A large part of the Jardin du Luxembourg was remade by Barillet-Deschamps into an English-style garden (1865).

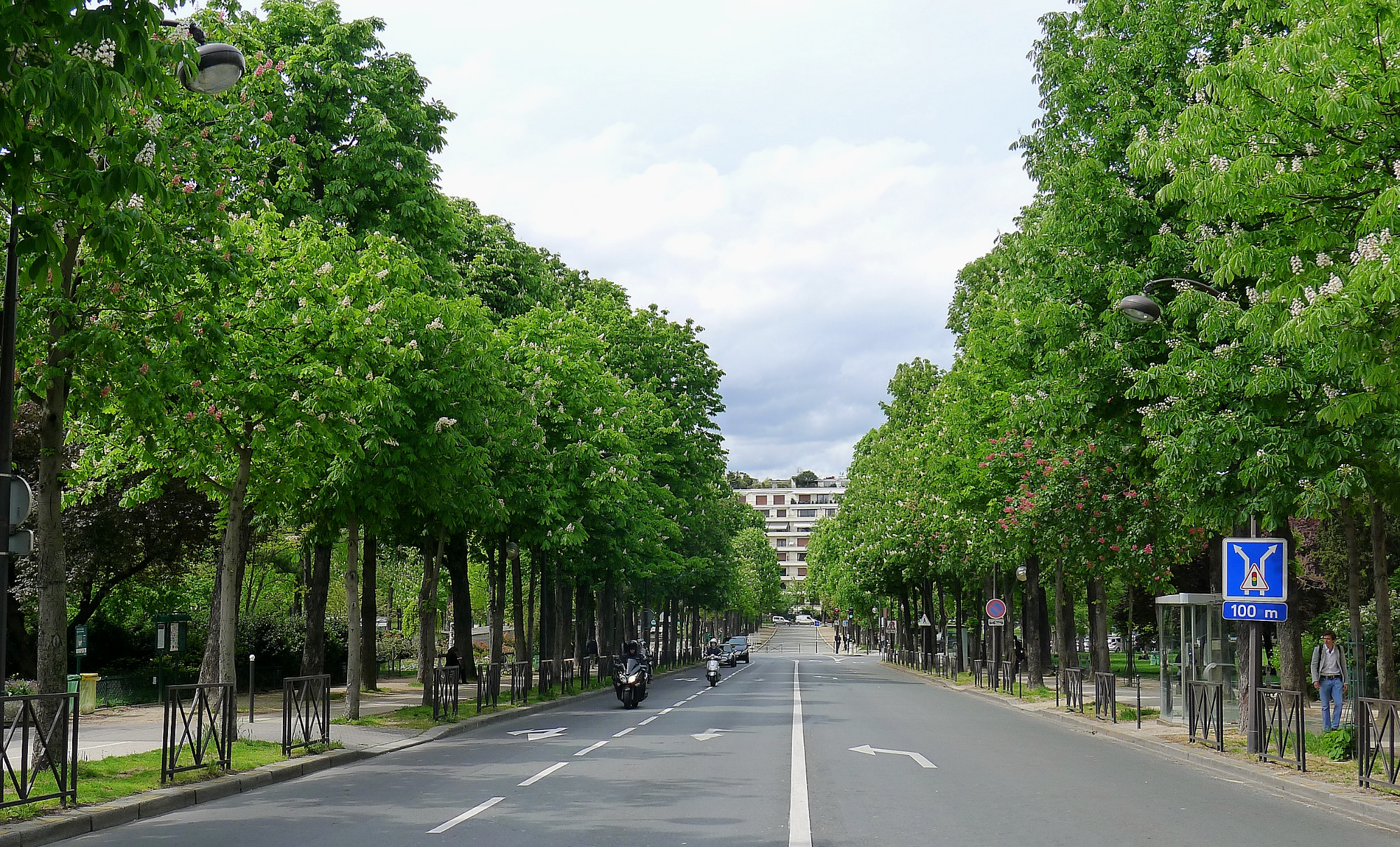
The Chausée de la Muette, in the 16th Arrondissement of Paris. By 1868 Jean-Pierre Barillet-Deschamps and his gardeners had planted over a hundred thousand trees along the new boulevards of Paris.

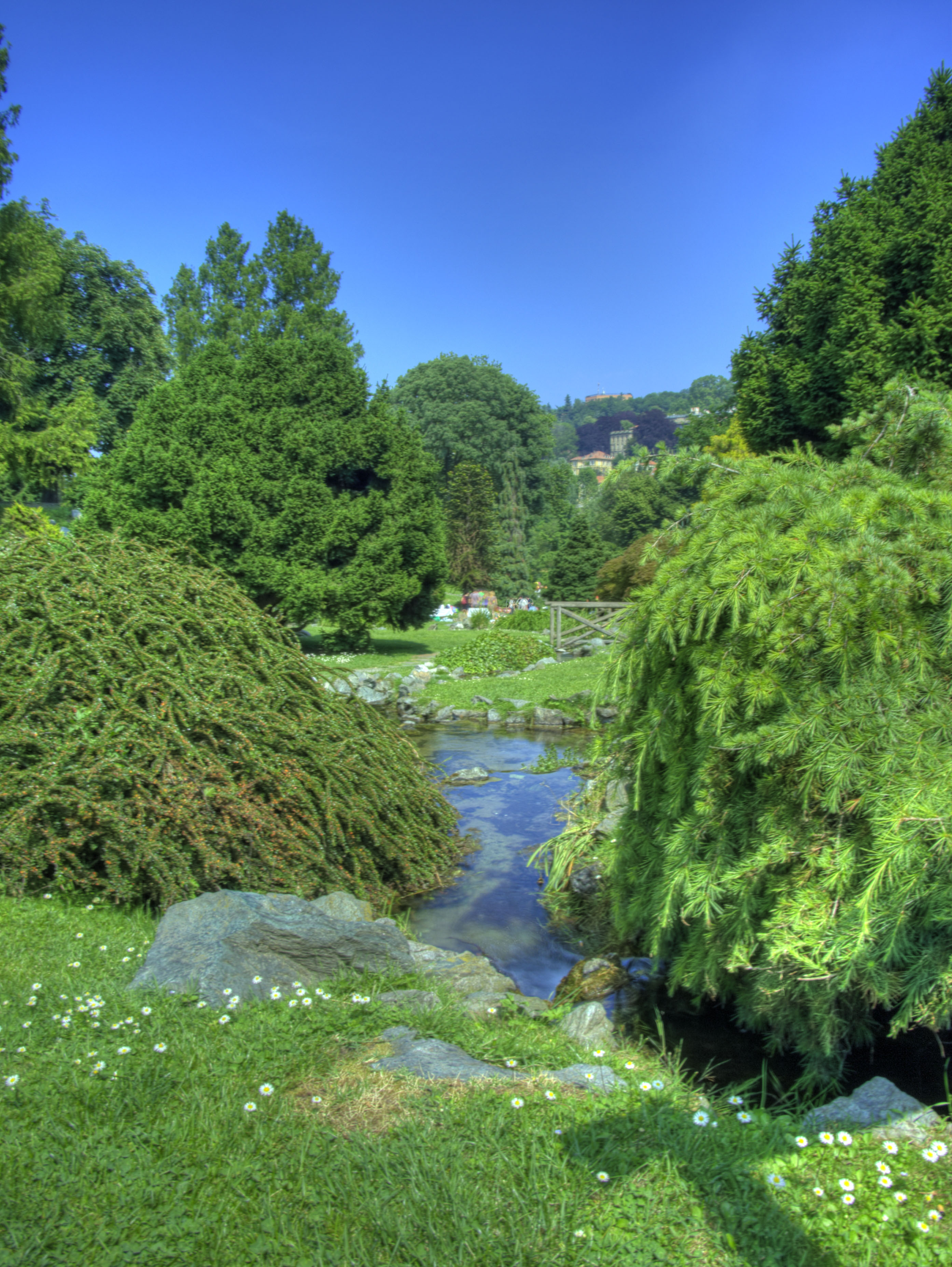
The Parco Valentino in Turin, Italy.

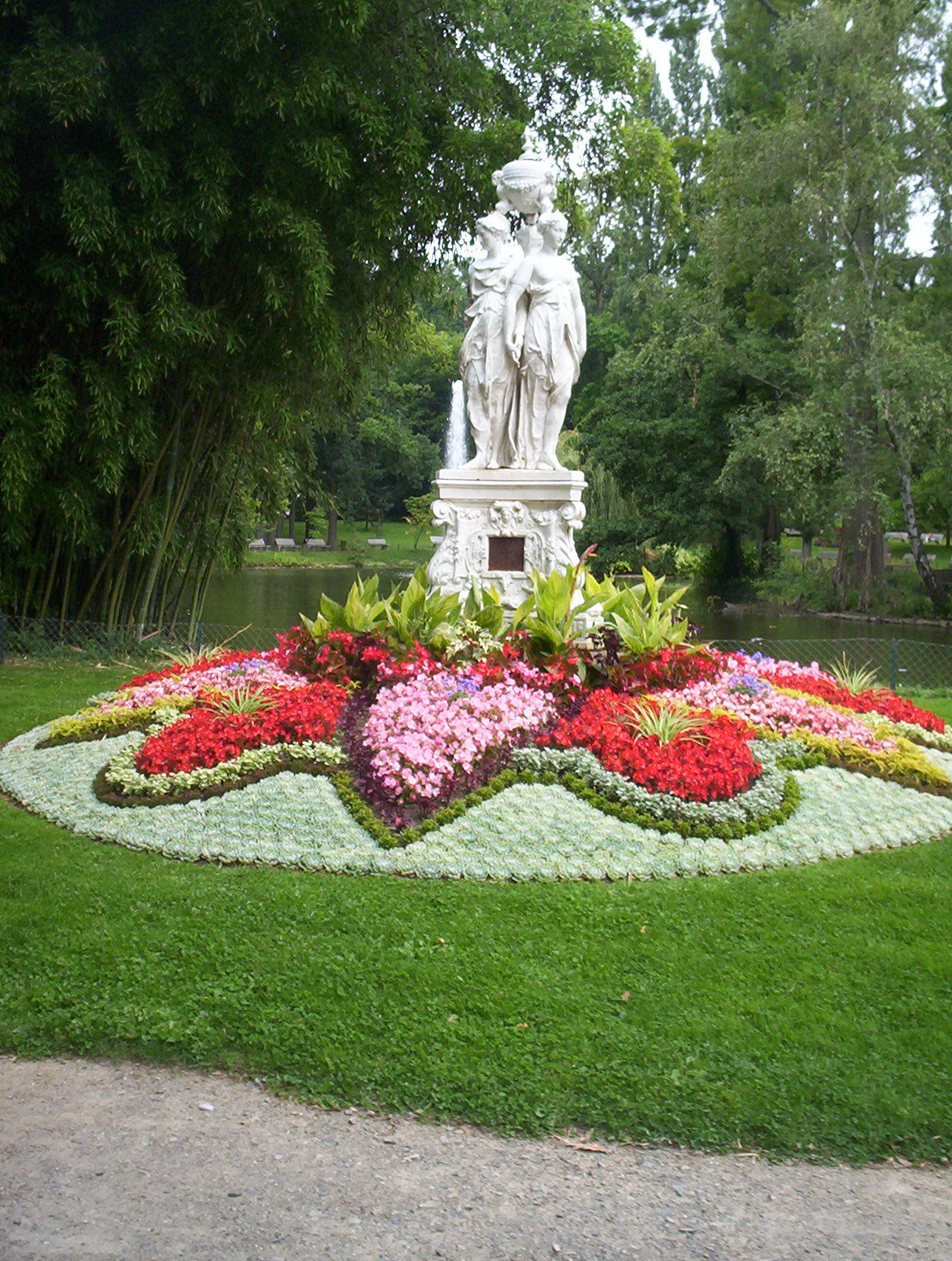
The Jardin des plantes in Le Mans (1865).

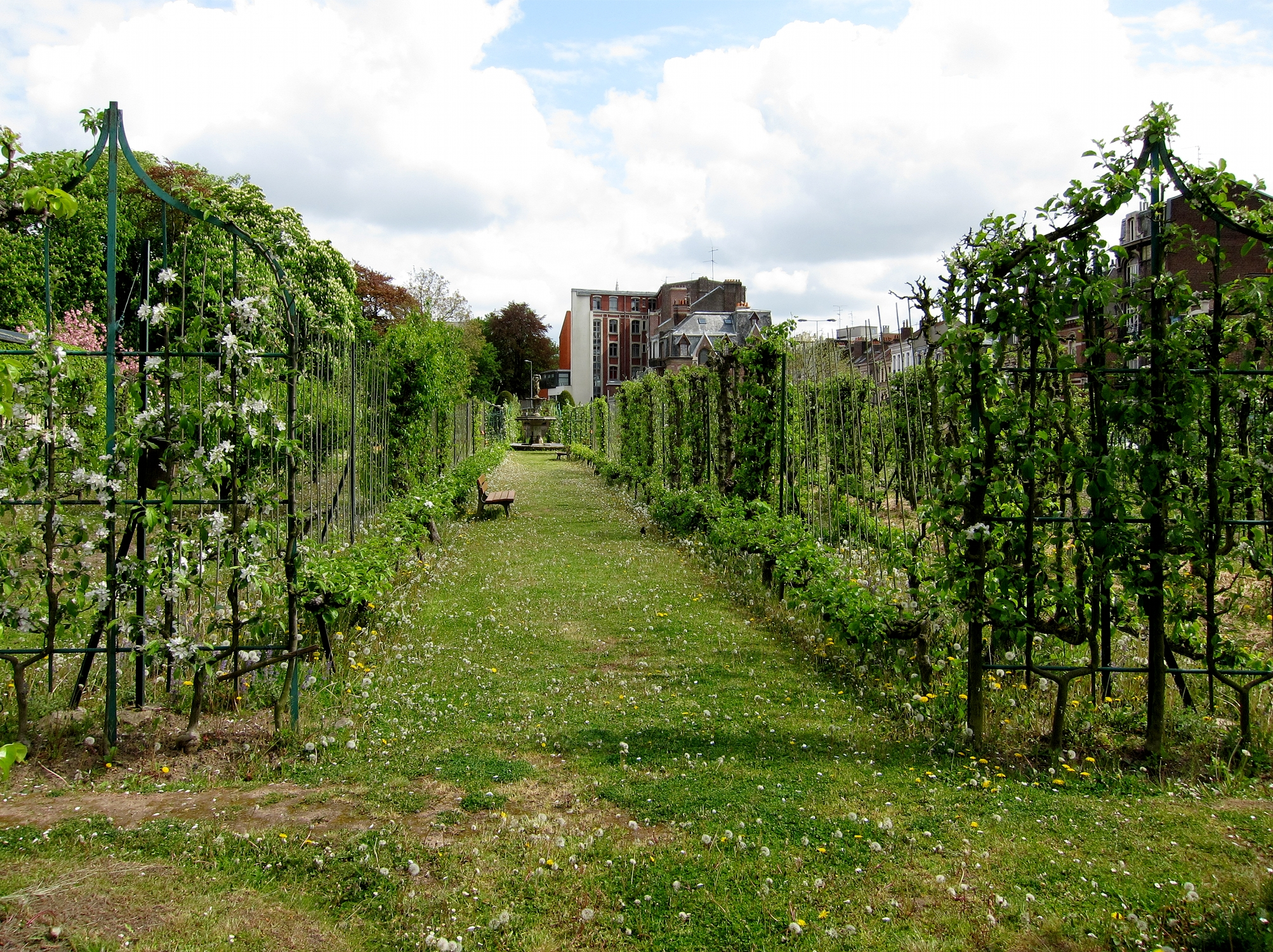
The tree nursery in the Jardin Vauban in Lille. (1863).

== Approach to landscaping ==
Barillet-Deschamps did not write formal treatises about landscape gardening, but in his correspondence he described his method and basic principles when laying out a park:

"First, study the relief of the site. The natural variations of the terrain, if they are significant, are the major elements to study.

"The plants form the principal element of the composition. Place the rarest plants so that they are clearly seen.

"The trees should be placed according to their shape and color to accent the view.

"The flowers should be placed in masses that are clearly seen and close to any residences. It is desirable to give prominence to those species which are common in the region where they are planted.

"Nature furnishes the major lines, but the vegetation should not strictly follow the laws of nature. The human intervention remains clear. The contours of the masses of plants should bordered by clear lines which resemble elliptical shapes.

"Ponds and streams are essential features of a large garden. The course of the stream, and the placement of the ponds, waterfalls, and rocks should be justified by the landscape and appear as natural as possible. The general principle is to preserve the appearance of nature without being an exact copy."

"A garden is a work of art where sculpture and architecture each have an important place.

"Once the landscape has been sculpted and the plants laid out, then the alleys and paths are drawn in.

"The network of alleys should be concentric. The paths which are farthest away must always lead the visitor toward the central parts or toward the habitations. The curves and changes of direction should be gentle and justified by natural obstacles. The alley should lead to its destination by the route that is the most convenient and pleasant. The path should also be hidden as much as possible, and one should see only the particular part of the path that one is on. To achieve that, the path should be slightly sunken so that it disappears in the general relief of the lawns."

== See also ==
- Orman Garden
