= Guido Cerniglia =

Italian actor (1939–2020)

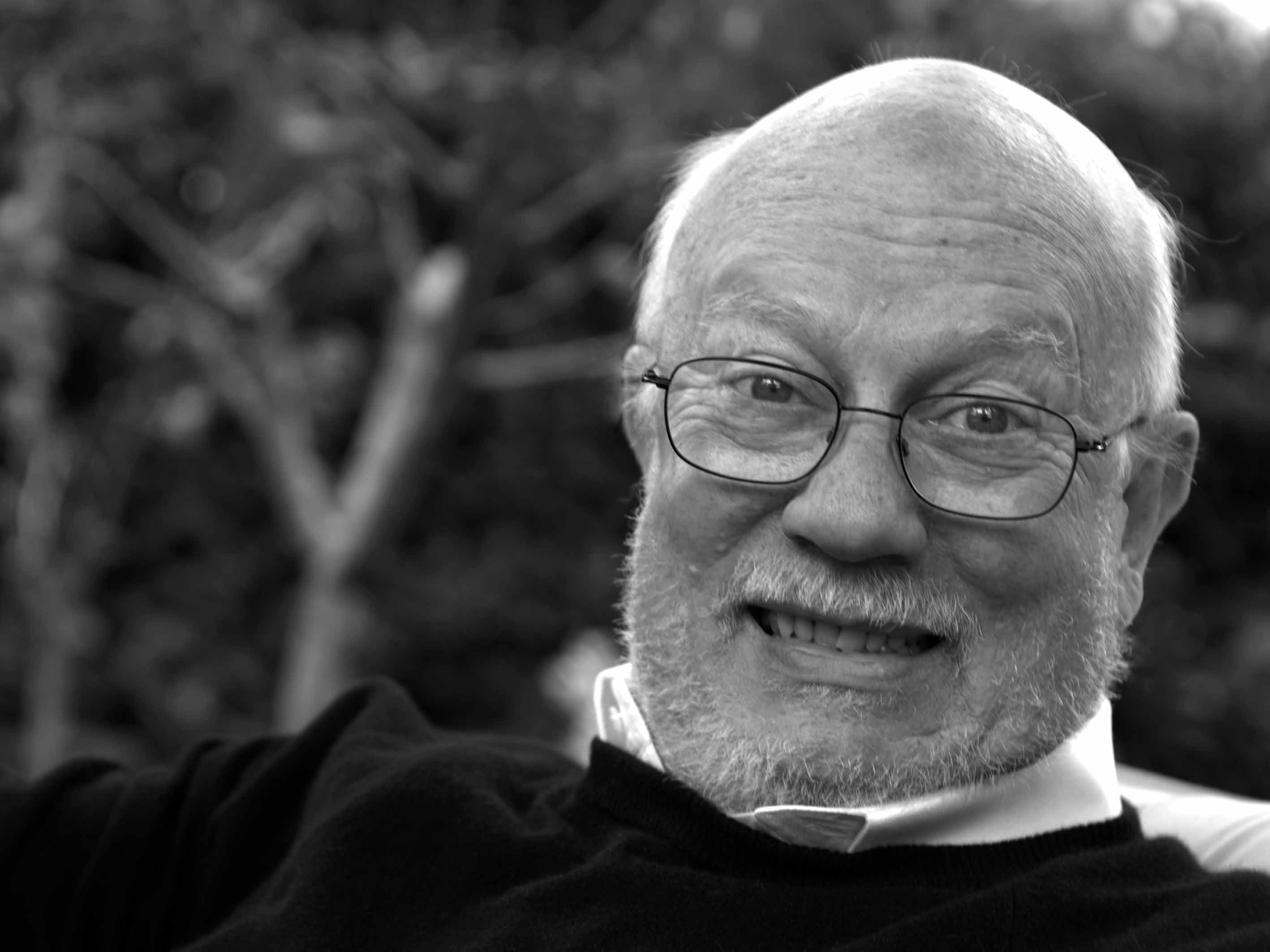
Guido Cerniglia

Guido Cerniglia (February 3, 1939 – May 14, 2020) was an Italian actor.
