= Luigi Filippo D'Amico =

Italian film director and screenwriter (1924–2007)

Luigi Filippo D'Amico (9 October 1924 – 28 April 2007) was an Italian film director and screenwriter. His 1974 film Il domestico was shown as part of a retrospective on Italian comedy at the 67th Venice International Film Festival.

== Selected filmography ==
- Eager to Live (1953)
- House of Ricordi (1954)
- Bravissimo (1955)
- Our Husbands (1966)
- The President of Borgorosso Football Club (1970)
- Amore e ginnastica (1973)
- Il domestico (1974)
- L'arbitro (1974)
