= Palais d'Antoniadis =

Palace in Alexandria, Egypt

Coordinates: 31°12′08″N 29°57′03″E

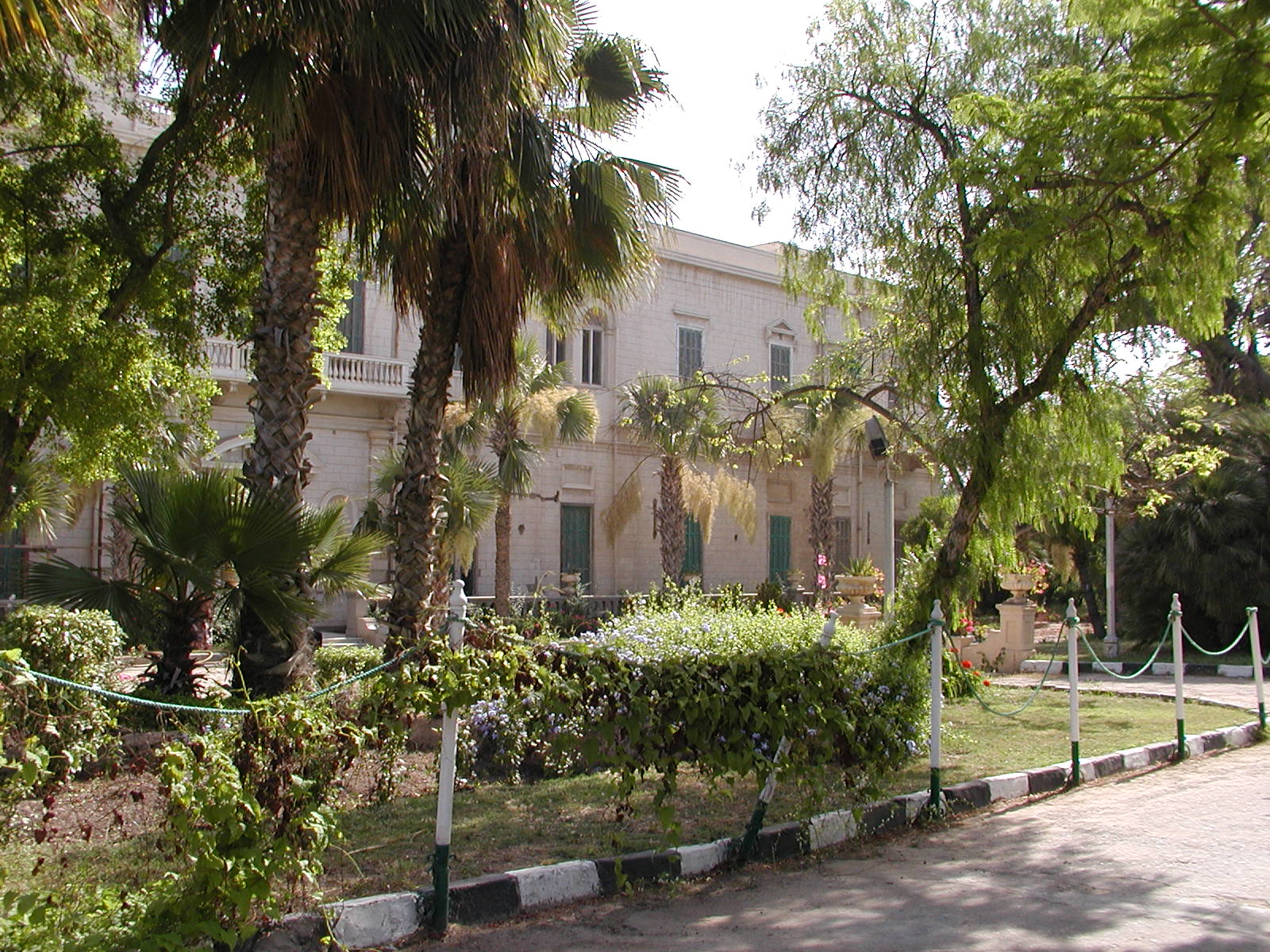
Palais d’Antoniadis

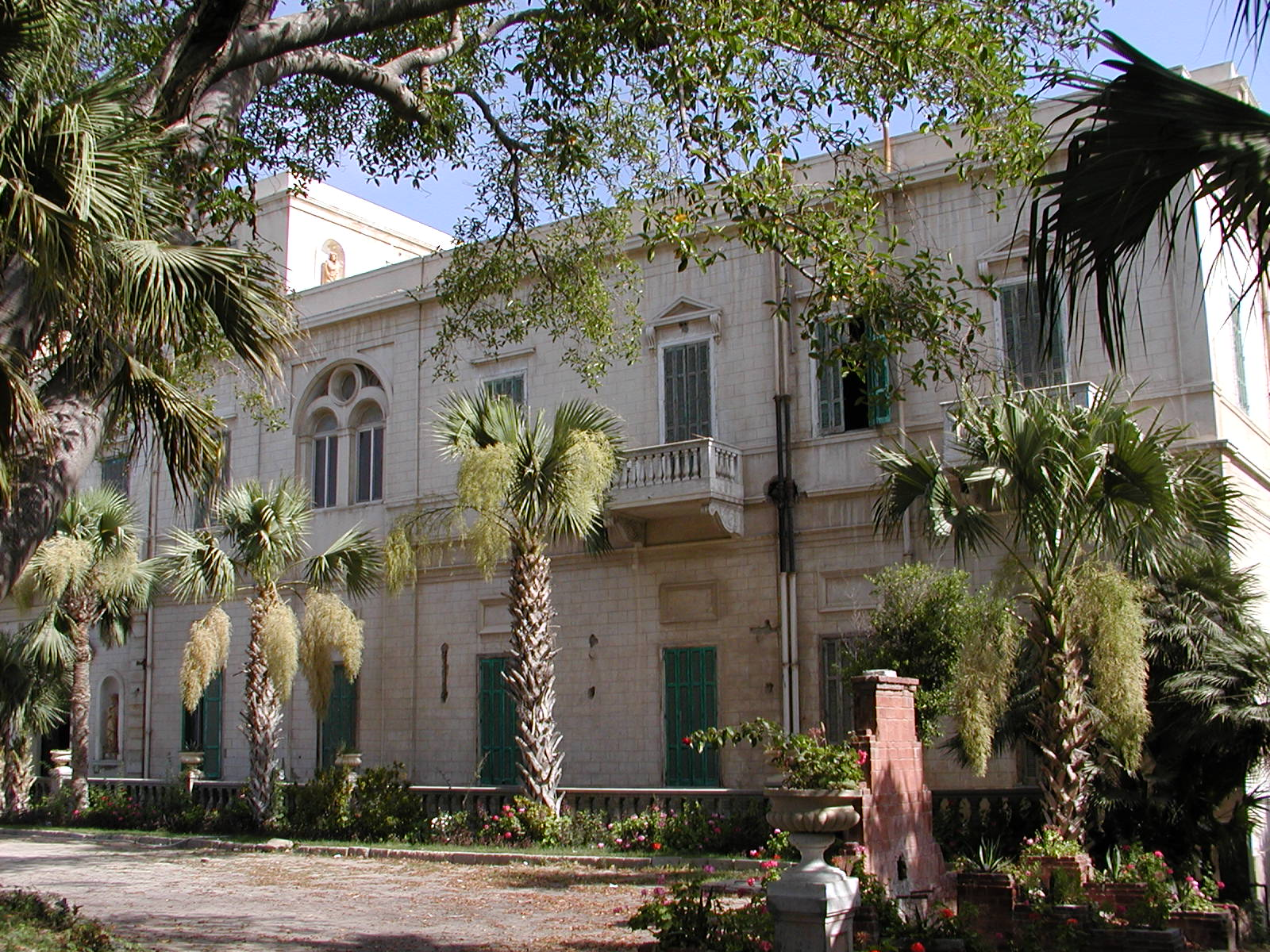
Palais d’Antoniadis

The Palais d'Antoniadis is a palace in Alexandria, Egypt, named after Sir John Antoniadis (1818–1895), who was an Alexandrian Greek. He was born in Lemnos and received French citizenship when he began to conduct business in Marseille. He was also president of the Greek Community in Alexandria and consul general of Belgium. He was knighted by Queen Victoria.

== Location ==
Situated near the Mahmoudia Canal at the southern entrance of Alexandria, the palace is surrounded by some 48 hectares (120 acres) of greenery, divided into several sections. They include the Antoniadis Garden, the Flower Garden, the Zoological and Botanical Gardens, and the Nouzaba Garden.

The Nouzaba (Nuzha) Municipal Garden was a residential suburb once inhabited by Callimachus (310–240 BC), a prominent scholar at the ancient Library of Alexandria.

In 168 BCE, the Roman envoy Gaius Pompillius Laenas met Antiochus IV Epiphanes, king of the Seleucid Empire, at the site of the modern palace, which was at the time known as Eleusis. In the so-called 'Day of Eleusis', Laenas delivered an ultimatum to Antiochus: withdraw your armies from Egypt and Cyprus or face war with Rome. When the king replied that he would consider what Laenas' had said, the Roman refused to accept such an answer. Using his cane, he drew a circle around Antiochus in the sand and told him that he must give Rome an answer before he stepped out of the circle: Peace or war? Antiochus acquiesced to Rome's demands and withdrew.

In 640 CE, the cavalry of the Arab conqueror Amr ibn al-As pitched camp at the site before entering the city.

The area was purchased by Sir John Antoniadis from Muhammad Ali's family.

== Description ==
The Antoniadis Palace and its park are constructed as a miniature version of the Palace of Versaille. The villa and its garden date back to the 19th century, and are mainly used to house a collection of statues sculpted in the Greek style and owned by Sir John Antoniadis. It consists of a basement level of 434 square meters, a ground floor of 1,085 square meters, a second floor of 860 meters and a roof area of 480 square meters, for a total area of 2,859 square metres (30,770 sq ft). The ground and second floors include 15 rooms each. There are several archaeological remains, including a tomb and a cistern.

=== Tomb ===
The tomb on the grounds, because of its setting and because of the Agathodaimon (god snake) that decorated its kline chamber, is popularly known as the "Tomb of Adam and Eve". Its entrance is down a deep staircase of forty-four steps that ends in a landing opening onto the court at the south end. It is believed to date from the first century BC. The principal rooms consist of an open-air court, a vestibule and an alcove with a funerary bed, on a single axis.

Here, the kline is reduced from a functional couch to a facade treated in low relief. During Sir John Antoniadis lifetime, it was a gathering place for the social elite, and was the scene of much gaiety and many parties.

=== Garden ===
The Antoniadis Garden includes a number of statues, Vasco de Gama, Christopher Columbus.

== Later history ==
In 1918 Antonis J. Antoniadis, the son of Sir John Antoniadis, donated the family mansion, grounds and gardens to the Alexandria Town Council.

Afterwards, it was used as a guest house to host visiting dignitaries to Egypt, including the King of Belgium, Greece, Italy, the Shah of Iran and Mohammed Reza Pahlavi, who was married to the Egyptian Princess Fawzia, the sister of King Farouk. The Villa also hosted the signing ceremony of the 1936 agreement between Egypt and Britain, which gave Egypt some limited independence, and it held the first meeting of the Egyptian Olympic Committee.

After the 1952 revolution, part of the original garden of the villa itself was used to enlarge the Nouzaha and zoological gardens. There was a general decline in the condition of the villa after about 1970, but the gardens remain in fairly good condition.
