= Shallalat Gardens =

Ancient garden in Alexandria, Egypt

Coordinates: 31°12′11″N 29°54′50″E

Picture at the Shallalat Gardens (Taken Aug. 2026)

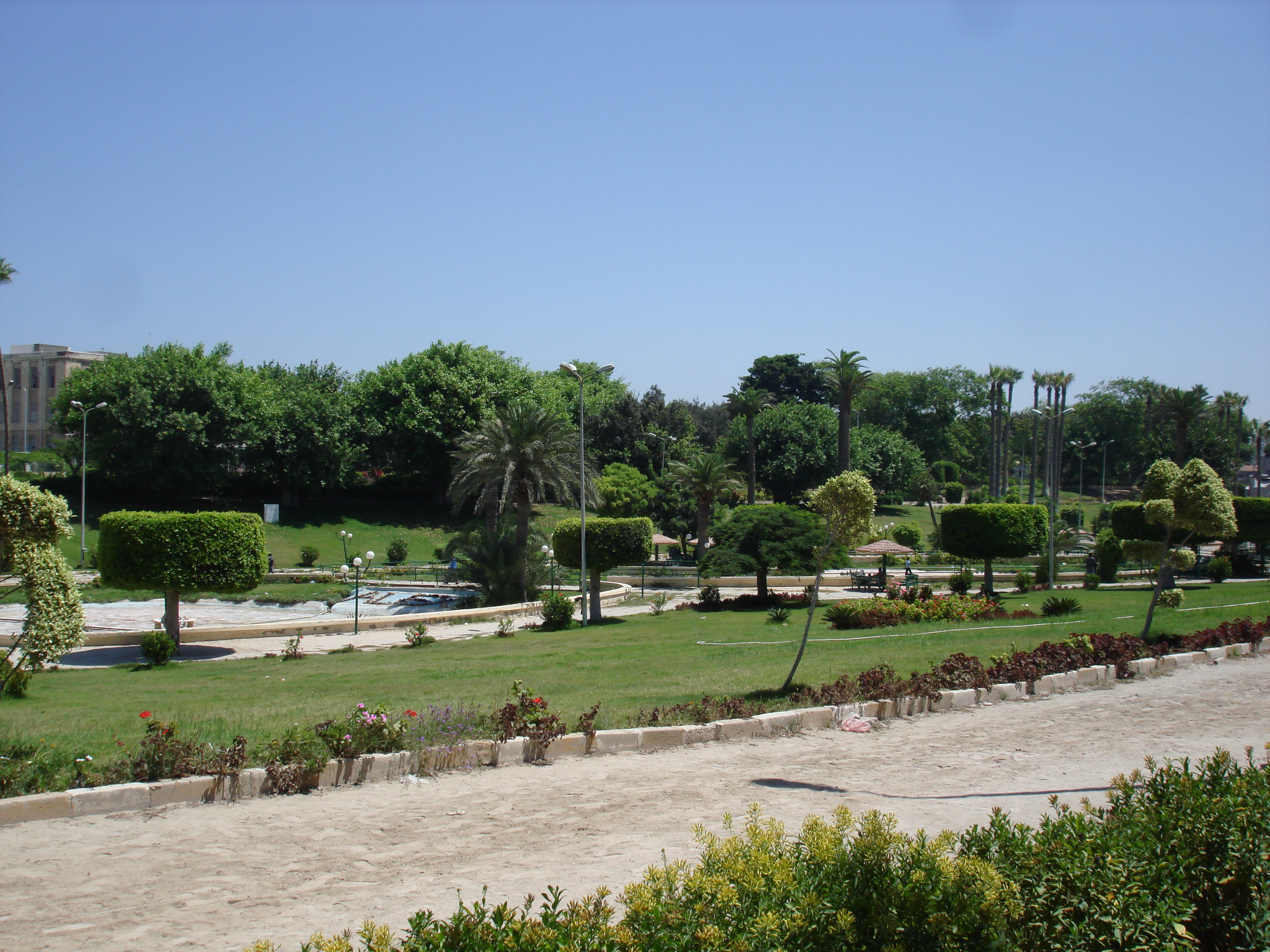
Part of Shallalat Gardens (Taken Sept. 2007)

Shallalat Gardens (Arabic: حدائق الشلالات) is the name of the ancient garden located in Alexandria, Egypt. The Shallalat Gardens occupy a large area of the Al Shatby neighborhood.

Parts of the ancient Wall of Alexandria are still present in the gardens.

== See also ==
- Gardens, Parks and Zoos in Alexandria
