= Edmondo De Amicis =

Italian novelist, journalist and poet (1846 – 1908)

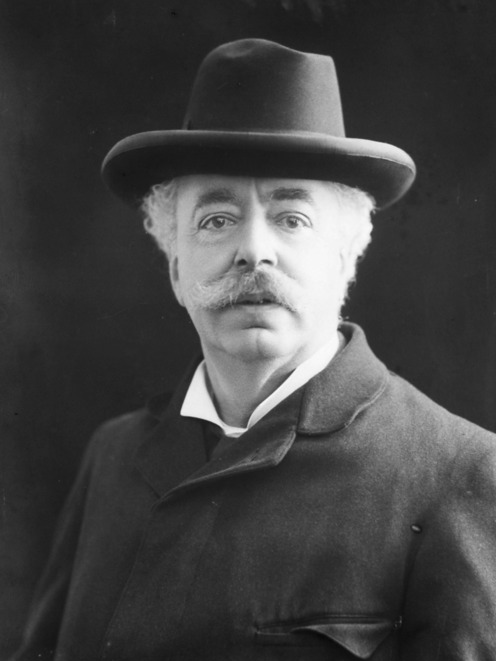
- Born: 21 October 1846; Oneglia, Piedmont-Sardinia
- Died: 11 March 1908 (aged 61); Bordighera, Kingdom of Italy
- Occupations: Novelist, journalist, short-story writer, poet
- Writing career
- Genre: Children's literature

Signature
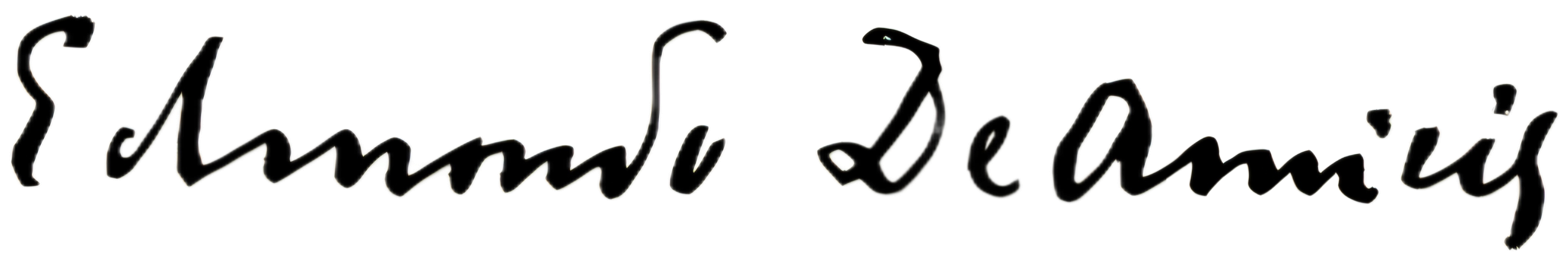

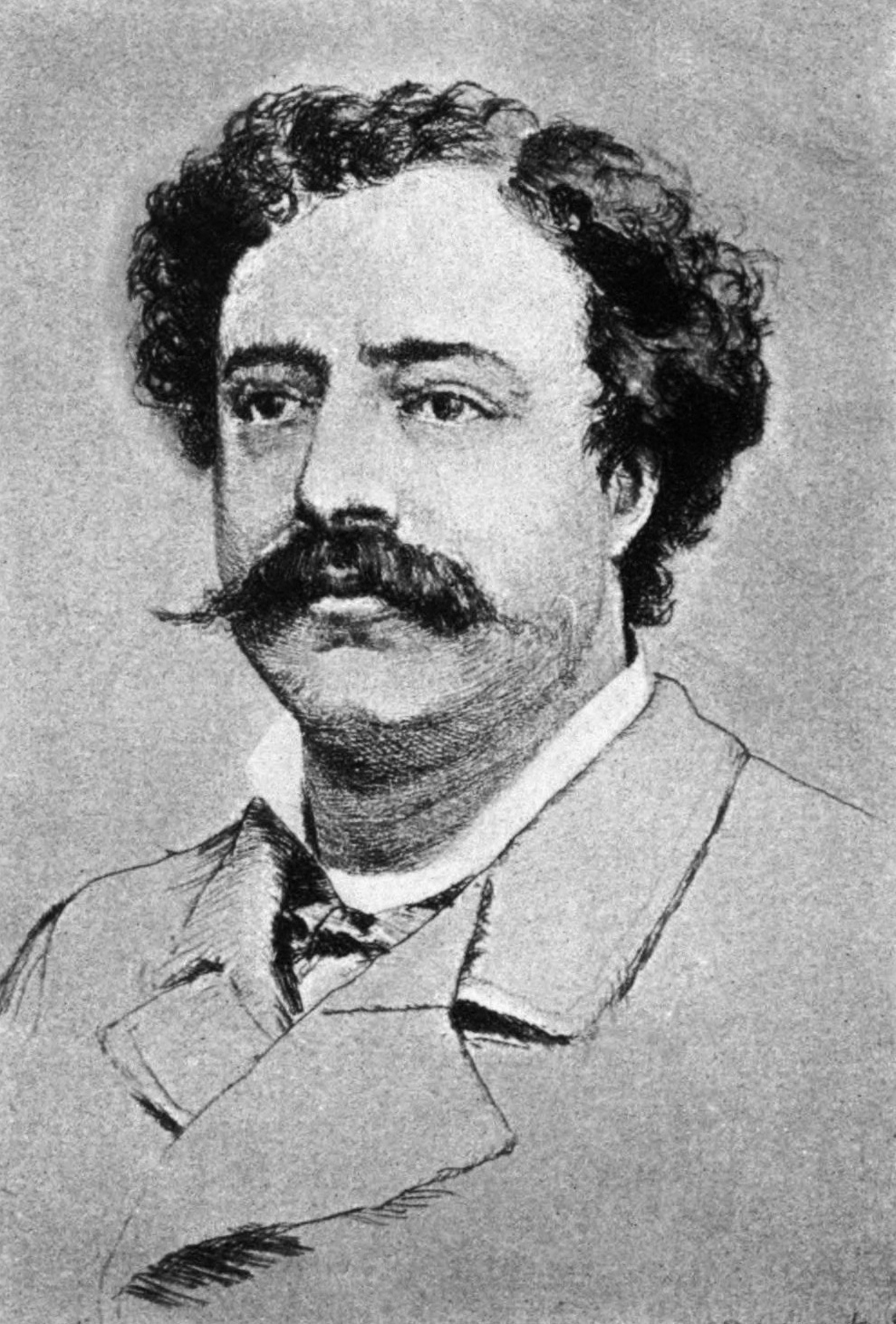
Gabrielle D. Clements, Edmondo De Amicis, 1898, etching

Edmondo De Amicis (Italian pronunciation: [edˈmondo de aˈmiːtʃis]; 21 October 1846 – 11 March 1908) was an Italian novelist, journalist, poet, and short-story writer. His best-known book is the children's novel Heart.

== Early career ==
Born in Oneglia (today part of the city of Imperia), he went to the Military Academy of Modena, and became an Army officer in the new Kingdom of Italy. Edmondo fought in the Battle of Custoza during the Third Italian War of Independence, a defeat of Savoy forces against the Austrian Empire; the spectacle left him disappointed, and contributed to his later decision to leave military life.

In Florence, he wrote his first sketches dealing with his frontline experience, collected as La vita militare ("Military Life", 1868), and first published by the journal of the Ministry of Defense, L'Italia Militare. He also met many leading literary figures in Florence and became interested in Alessandro Manzoni's ideas on language for the new, heterogeneous nation. In 1870, he joined the staff of the journal La Nazione in Rome, and his correspondence at the time later served as base for his travel writings: Spagna (1873), Olanda (1874), Ricordi di Londra (1874), Marocco (1876), Constantinople (1878), Ricordi di Parigi (1879). A new edition of Constantinople, considered by many his masterpiece and the best description of the city in the 19th century, was published in 2005, with a foreword by Umberto Eco.

== Heart ==
Heart was issued by Treves on 17 October 1886, then the first day of school in Italy. Its success was immense: in a few months it was printed in 40 Italian editions and translated into dozens of languages. Its praise for the creation of the united Italian state in the previous decade contributed to its reception, but also led to criticism from some Roman Catholic politicians for failing to depict the nature of the Holy See's opposition to the annexation of Rome.

Initiated to the Scottish Rite Freemasonry, possibly in the regular Masonic Lodge Concordia in Montevideo, Uruguay, De Amicis held the public greeting speech in honor of the mason Giovanni Bovio during the first representation of his theatral drama titled San Paolo, interpreted by the Italian actor and mason Giovanni Emanuel. His book Cuore has been considered for decades an educative textbook largely read and studied in the Italian public schools. Some literary critics noted it substituted the traditional Roman Catholic doctrine with a lay civil religion where heroes took the place of Christian martyrs, the Statuto Albertino displaced the Gospels, the Church, its believers and the Ten Commandments were respectively deleted in favour of the State, the figure of the citizen and the protection of the Italian codes of laws. The Grand Orient of Italy recognized De Amicis as one of his most notable past members.

== Later years ==
The nationalist message visible in De Amicis' works was soon fused with a commitment to socialism (a trend visible within Heart). In 1896, he adhered to the Italian Socialist Party. He was elected a Foreign Honorary Member of the American Academy of Arts and Sciences in 1901.

His later works include: Sull'oceano (1889), dealing with the plight of Italian emigrants overseas, Il romanzo di un maestro (1890), Amore e ginnastica (1891), Maestrina degli operai (1895), La carrozza di tutti (1899), L'idioma gentile (1905), and Nuovi ritratti letterari e artistici (1908). At the same time, he contributed to the Turin-based Il Grido del Popolo - his articles were collected as Questione sociale ("Social Issues", 1894).

De Amicis died in Bordighera at the "Hotel de la Reine", which he chose because it was George MacDonald's Casa Coraggio, Bordighera. His last years were marked by tragedy and spent in seclusion; he was marked by his mother's death, and the frequent conflicts with his wife - ultimately, these were the source of an even greater emotional shock for De Amicis, as they led to his son Furio's suicide (as schoolchildren, Furio and his brother Ugo had served as inspiration for Heart).

== Legacy ==
Alberto Brambilla of Sorbonne University wrote that "historians of Italian literature consider him a “minor author" but that the publication of Constantinople was evidence that he was "one best-known Italian authors abroad".
