= The Sunshine Boys (disambiguation) =

The Sunshine Boys is a 1972 play by Neil Simon.

The Sunshine Boys may also refer to:

- The Sunshine Boys (1975 film)
- The Sunshine Boys (1996 film)
