= Linda Morand =

American fashion model, cover girl, and consultant

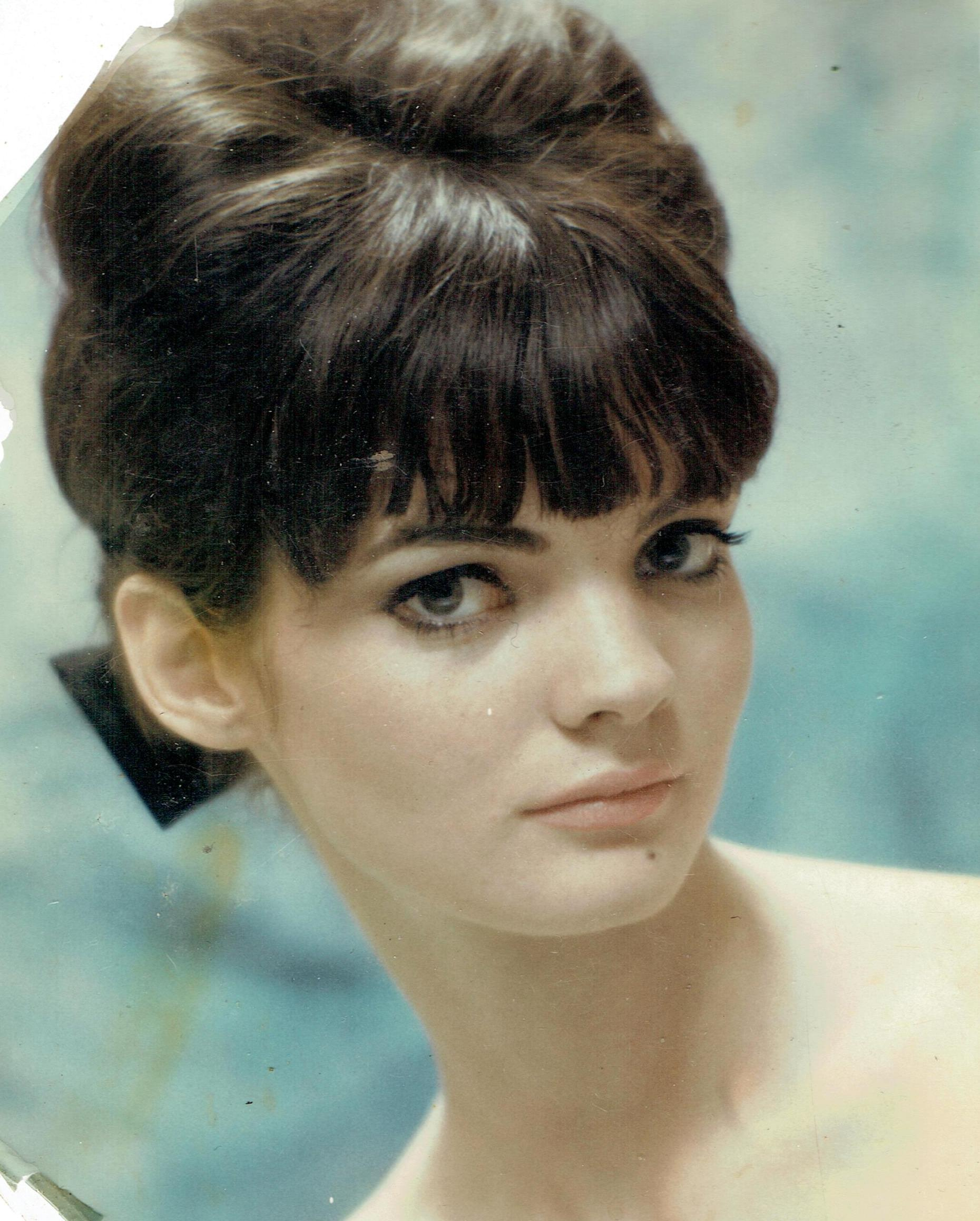
- Born: May 26, 1946 (age 80); Lindenhurst, Long Island, New York, USA
- Occupations: Model, Actress, fashion archivist, Modeling Agent
- Years active: 1965 - present
- Agents: Key West Hand Print Fabrics (1964–1965) Ford Models (1966–1968) Paris Planning Model Agency (1967–1968); Prestige Model Agency Paris (1973–1975)
- Spouse: Philippe Forquet(D.1970-1979)

Linda Morand (born May 26, 1946) is an American fashion model, cover-girl and haute couture mannequin during the 1960s and 1970s. She appeared in national ads, magazine covers, TV commercials and national catalogs. She became a fashion archivist and consultant.

== New York Career ==
Morand was born in Lindenhurst, Long Island. She was discovered by Eileen Ford in late 1965 while studying art in New York City and groomed into a top model for the Ford Agency. Appearing on the fashion scene at the same time as Twiggy she was noted for making up very unusual poses and participating in futuristic fashion layouts including light shows, robots, super-heroes, computers and James Bond type spy take-offs.

Morand is known for her resemblance to the former First Lady Jacqueline Kennedy. Noted columnist Marian Christy wrote about a meeting of the two women in a 1971 Boston Globe article, "Resemblance to Jackie Pays Off", which helped to further Morand's career:

"Jacqueline Kennedy Onassis and Linda Morand recently met at that chic New York "dive" where Lost Weekend [sic] was filmed: P. J. Clarke's, and the two eyed each other suspiciously. There was every reason for the prolonged glance! of cool appraisal. The two are look-alikes 21-year-old Linda being the younger, prettier version. Linda, a successful Ford model who hails from a little town on Long Island, now is one of Europe's top models with her face currently, gracing the pages and covers of the slickest fashion, magazines, such as Italian Vogue, Elle and Jardin de la Mode."

In 1966 Vidal Sassoon’s, stylist, Christopher Pluck created her signature style, a closely cropped asymmetric cut. Linda Morand appeared in international magazines including Vogue, Glamour, Mademoiselle, Teen, and Elle. She also modeled for Lilly Pulitzer. In 1966, with photographer Gösta Peterson, she created images for Conde Nast.

== European career ==
In the Sixties Morand was contracted to walk the runways of Paris and appear in the pages of the European fashion magazines, such as Elle, Marie Claire and ''Vogue. Her modeling career took her on assignments throughout the fashion capitals of Europe, including Paris, Milan, Munich and Barcelona. She was muse to Pierre Cardin, who contracted with her to walk the runway and appear in fashion photos.

Morand was based in Rome through 1969 modeling for fashion houses Valentino, Pucci and Roberto Capucci and playing small parts in a few Italian movies and TV shows. Shortly after her marriage to French actor Philippe Forquet in 1970, her husband became a teen idol starring as General Lafayette in a prime time historical mini-series for ABC called The Young Rebels.

By 1974 her modeling assignments included walking the catwalks of the major European haute couture designers including Pierre Cardin, Jean Patou, Karl Lagerfeld, Emanuel Ungaro, Paco Rabanne, Chanel and Valentino.

Helmut Newton shot a ten-page spread for Vogue Paris with Morand made up in a satirical reportage type layout that seemed like she was really Jacqueline Kennedy Onassis. The pictures caused such a stir that Richard Avedon sent a telegram of congratulation, and said Jackie was ready to sue. This incident calmed down when it was pointed out that Linda Morand's name was mentioned in the article. This led to additional assignments throughout Europe. Hans Feurer photographed her for several layouts in Italian Vogue, Marie Claire, Mode International.

== Acting ==
=== Filmography ===
Year	Title	Role	Notes
1969	Camille 2000	Girl at Gambling Table (uncredited)	
1970	Pussycat, Pussycat, I Love You	Moira	
1971	Pretty Maids all in a Row	Other Pretty Maids	
1971	The Love Machine	Model (uncredited)	

=== Television ===
Year	Title	Role	Notes
1970	Matt Lincoln	Angie	1 episode "Angie"
1992	Live! Regis and Kathy Lee	Jacki Onasis	Episode dated 20 January 1992
