= Philippe Forquet =

French actor (1940–2020)

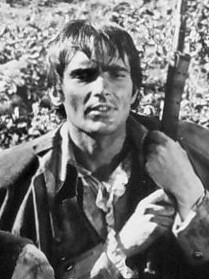
Forquet in 1970

Philippe Forquet, vicomte de Dorne (27 September 1940 – 18 February 2020) was a French actor and the son of a wealthy aristocrat Marcius Forquet, vicomte de Dorne.

== Biography ==
Born in Paris, Forquet made his film debut in 1960 in La Menace while still an art student and over the next few years became popular in France. Highly regarded for his appearance he was expected to make a successful transition into American films, after appearing opposite Jean Seberg, In the French Style (1963). Filmed in France, the film told of an American student (Seberg) who falls in love with an aristocrat (Forquet) while visiting France. It proved popular with both European and American audiences and Forquet travelled to Hollywood to work for 20th Century Fox. He was touted as the handsomest new actor in Hollywood, a cross between Montgomery Clift and Louis Jourdan.

He co-starred with Sandra Dee in Take Her, She's Mine as her romantic interest, and while the film was popular, it did not lead to other projects. During this time, Forquet became engaged to the American actress Sharon Tate, but the relationship ended because of career conflicts. He studied drama at The Actors Studio in New York City.

In 1969, he co starred in the film Camille 2000, a remake of the famous Alexandre Dumas fils story The Lady of the Camellias. In 1970, he also starred as Brigadier-General Charles de la Bédoyère in Waterloo, being an Aide-de-Camp to Napoleon (Rod Steiger). He returned to the United States to film The Young Rebels in 1970–1971. He returned to France where he continued acting in television throughout the 1970s.

Forquet was married to the American fashion model and actress Linda Morand from 1970 until their divorce in 1976. He lived in the town of Saint-Quentin, France, where he took over his father's estate and the family business. He remarried and had three children.

He died in February 2020 at the age of 79.

== Selected filmography ==
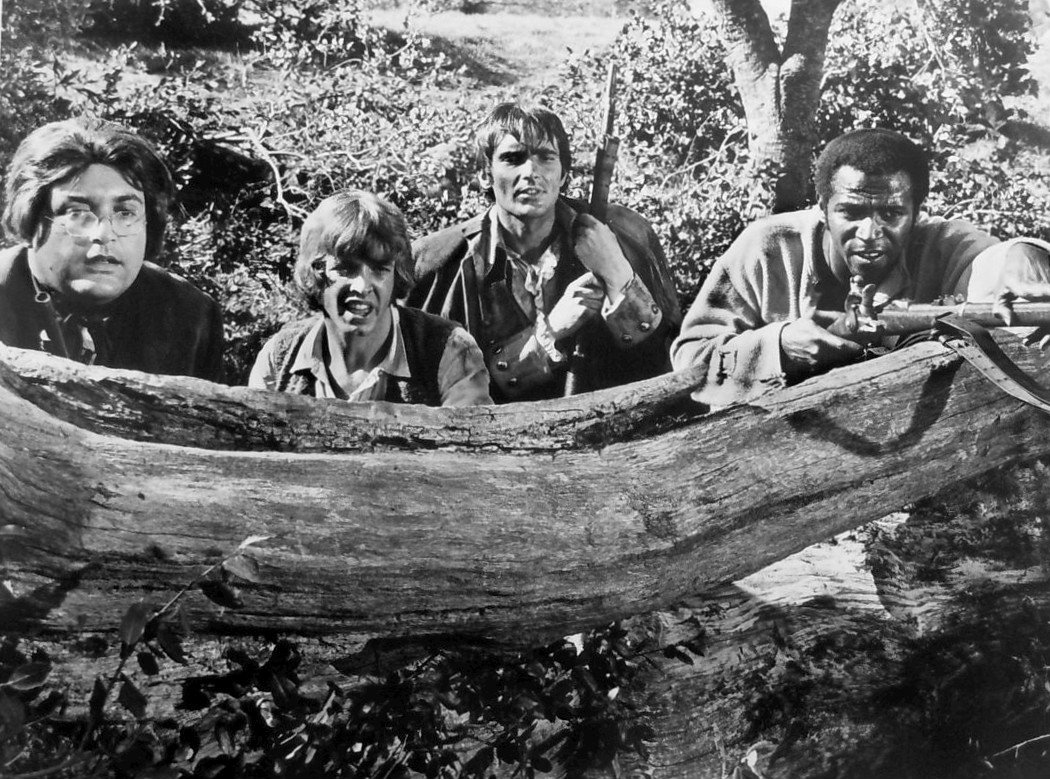
Forquet (center), next to Richard Ely (second from left), Alex Henteloff (first from left) and Louis Gossett Jr. (first from right) in a scene from the television show The Young Rebels in 1970

- The Menace (1961 film) (1961)
- The Nina B. Affair (1961)
- Take Her, She's Mine (1963)
- In the French Style (1963)
- Three Nights of Love (1967)
- To Die in Paris (1968)
- Camille 2000 (1969)
- Waterloo (1970)
