= Conrad Palmisano =

American stuntman and film director (1948–2024)

- Born: Conrad Earl Palmisano; May 1, 1948; Santa Rosa, California, U.S.
- Died: January 10, 2024 (aged 75)
- Occupations: Stuntman, film director
- Years active: 1970–2024
- Spouses: Irene Cara (m. 1986; div. 1991) Kathryn Anderson (m. 2000; died 2019)
- Awards: Zee Cine Award for Best Action Film

Conrad Earl Palmisano (May 1, 1948 – January 10, 2024) was an American film stuntman and film director.

== Career ==
His career began in 1970 on TV's The Young Rebels. In 1972, he was stunt coordinator for The Final Comedown. In 1980, he became president of the Stuntmen's Association of Motion Pictures for four seasons. He was one of the first engineers toward integrating Academy of Motion Picture Arts and Sciences in 1984.

Palmisano became known mainly for integrating committee established filmmakers like First Blood (1982), Robocop 2 (1990), Batman Forever (1995), Free Willy 2 (1995), Assassins (1995) with Sylvester Stallone, Rush Hour 2 (2001) with Jackie Chan; After the Sunset (2004) with Pierce Brosnan and Salma Hayek, The Other Guys (2010) with Will Ferrell, and additional credits in 300 major films and TV shows. He was nominated for a Taurus Award for both Rush Hour 2 (2001) and Rush Hour 3 (2007).

== Personal life and death ==
Palmisano was married to singer and actress Irene Cara from 1986 to 1991. They met while filming Certain Fury (1985). They also worked together on Busted Up (1986), his second and last feature film as executive director. That marriage ended in divorce. In 2000, Palmisano married actress Kathryn Anderson, who died in 2019.

Palmisano died on January 10, 2024, at the age of 75.

== Filmography ==
Year	Title	Stunts	Second unit director	Director
1980	Smokey and the Bandit II	Yes	No	Hal Needham
1982	Rambo: First Blood	Yes	Yes	Ted Kotcheff
1983	Cujo	Yes	No	Lewis Teague
1983	Uncommon Valor	Yes	Yes	Ted Kotcheff
1984	The Natural	Yes	No	Barry Levinson
1985	Space Rage	No	No	Himself
1986	Busted Up	No	No	Himself
1988	She's Having a Baby	Yes	Yes	John Hughes
1989	Weekend at Bernie's	Yes	Yes	Ted Kotcheff
1989	Turner & Hooch	Yes	No	Roger Spottiswoode
1990	Robocop 2	Yes	Yes	Irvin Kershner
1992	Under Siege	Yes	Yes	Andrew Davis
1993	Weekend at Bernie's II	Yes	Yes	Robert Klane
1993	Robocop 3	Yes	Yes	Fred Dekker
1994	On Deadly Ground	Yes	No	Steven Seagal
1994	The Cowboy Way	Yes	Yes	Gregg Champion
1995	Batman Forever	Yes	Yes	Joel Schumacher
1995	Assassins	Yes	Yes	Richard Donner
1995	Free Willy 2: The Adventure Home	Yes	Yes	Dwight Little
1998	Six Days, Seven Nights	Yes	Yes	Ivan Reitman
1998	Lethal Weapon 4	Yes	Yes	Richard Donner
1999	Bringing Out the Dead	Yes	No	Martin Scorsese
2001	Rush Hour 2	Yes	Yes	Brett Ratner
2003	Peter Pan	Yes	Yes	P.J. Hogan
2004	After the Sunset	Yes	Yes	Brett Ratner
2004	New York Minute	Yes	Action unit director	Dennie Gordon
2005	Into the Blue	No	Yes	John Stockwell
2006	X-Men: The Last Stand	Yes	Yes	Brett Ratner
2007	Rush Hour 3	Yes	Yes	Brett Ratner
2007	Disturbia	Yes	Yes	D.J. Caruso
2008	Seven Pounds	No	Yes	Gabriele Muccino
2010	The Other Guys	Yes	Yes	Adam McKay
2011	No Strings Attached	Yes	Yes	Ivan Reitman
2012	21 Jump Street	Yes	No	Phil Lord and Christopher Miller
2014	22 Jump Street	Yes	No	Phil Lord and Christopher Miller
