= Dave Dave =

American artist and burn survivor

- Born: David Charles Rothenberg; June 18, 1976
- Died: July 15, 2018 (aged 42); Las Vegas, Nevada, U.S.
- Other name: David Jordan Robinson
- Education: ArtCenter College of Design
- Occupations: contemporary conceptual artist; music producer; disc jockey; rap musician; music video director
- Awards: Hollywood F.A.M.E., 2018 (posthumous)

Dave Dave (June 18, 1976 – July 15, 2018), born David Charles Rothenberg and later known as David Jordan Robinson, was an American conceptual artist whose father was found guilty of attempting to kill him by burning in 1983, when he was six years old.

== Attempted murder ==
David Rothenberg was six years old and living with his mother, Marie Rothenberg, in the Carroll Gardens neighborhood of Brooklyn, New York, when his father, Charles Rothenberg, took him to California. The parents were divorced and in conflict over custody of David; after the two argued on the telephone, on the evening of March 3, 1983, at a motel in Buena Park, Charles gave his son a sleeping pill and after he fell asleep, poured kerosene on the bed and set fire to it. He left the room and watched from a telephone booth across the street while other guests rescued David.

David had third-degree burns over 90% of his body; he required finger and toe amputations and received a total of more than a hundred skin grafts. He was badly disfigured and during one grafting operation experienced brain swelling that led to seizures and other complications. Charles Rothenberg, who stated that he had originally intended to kill himself as well as his son, was sentenced in July 1983 to 13 years in prison, the maximum permitted at the time for his offenses; guidelines were changed as a result of the case. He was released in 1990 on three years' supervised parole after serving seven years. After two years he fled, but turned himself in to authorities. In 1996 he was tried for a shooting in Oakland, at which time Dave, then 19, visited him in prison; he read a statement to him in which he stated that Charles Rothenberg was "not a father but an imposter". In 1998 Charles Rothenberg changed his name to Charley Charles, and in 2007, after also being convicted of various offenses in two other states, under California's three strikes law he was sentenced to 25 years to life for weapons offenses in San Francisco.

David Rothenberg made television appearances, met celebrities including Michael Jordan, and became a friend and protégé of Michael Jackson. Dave also made efforts to support other burn victims, both on a personal level and on a broader level in fundraising for the UC Irvine Burns Center.

Marie Rothenberg married Richard Hafdahl, a police officer who had supervised the fire investigation, and moved to Orange County, California with David. In 1985 she published a book titled David, which was adapted into the 1988 TV movie of the same name. Marie Rothenberg and Mel White published an expanded version of the book in 2019 as David's Story: Burned by His Father's Rage, Healed by His Mother's Love.

== Later life and career ==
Rothenberg legally changed his name by 1992 to David Jordan Robinson. He attended ArtCenter College of Design. By 1996 he was using only his first name; he then legally changed his name to Dave Dave, to "free myself of [Charles Rothenberg's] name and his legacy", as he said then. He became a house music DJ, music producer and rap musician; in 1996 he directed a music video for Kelli Lidell. He later focused on conceptual art in Las Vegas. His work included a project titled Lifted that he said grew out of "a conscious desire to inspire others to be greater than themselves" and collaborations with artists including Sheridee Hopper.

Dave died at the age of 42 on July 15, 2018, at Sunrise Hospital in Las Vegas, from complications of pneumonia. He was posthumously awarded a Hollywood F.A.M.E. award in 2018 for artistic merit.
