= In the French Style =

1963 film by Robert Parish

- Directed by: Robert Parrish
- Written by: Irwin Shaw
- Produced by: Claude Ganz; Robert Parrish; Irwin Shaw
- Starring: Jean Seberg; Stanley Baker; Philippe Forquet
- Cinematography: Michel Kelber
- Edited by: Renée Lichtig
- Music by: Joseph Kosma
- Production company: Orsay Films
- Distributed by: Columbia Pictures
- Release date: September 18, 1963
- Running time: 105 minutes
- Countries: France; United States
- Language: English

In the French Style is a 1963 French-American romance film released by Columbia Pictures directed by Robert Parrish and starring Jean Seberg, Stanley Baker and Philippe Forquet. It was based on a short story by Irwin Shaw.

== Plot ==
Young American student Christina James comes to Paris to live in the art scene. After six months in Paris, she meets twenty-one year old Guy at a crowded gallery and their romance develops. Later, she enjoys encounters with European men. Her Chicago-based history professor father cautions her about fleeting love. She abandons a long-time attachment to a British international journalist to marry American surgeon Dr. John Haislip.

== Cast ==
- Jean Seberg as Christina James
- Stanley Baker as Walter Beddoes
- Philippe Forquet as Guy
- Addison Powell as Mr. James, Christina's father
- Jack Hedley as Bill Norton
- Maurice Teynac as Baron Edward de Chassier
- James Leo Herlihy as Dr. John Haislip
- Ann Lewis as Stephanie Morell
- Jacques Charon as Patrini
- Claudine Auger as Clio Andropolous
- Barbara Sommers as Madame Piguet
- Moustache as cafe owner

== Production ==
The film was a notable change of pace for male star Stanley Baker.

== Reception ==
Variety said it had "strong femme appeal".
