= Richard Ely (actor) =

American actor (1945–2019)

- Born: Richard Kent Ely Weber; 4 May 1945; Terre Haute, Indiana, U.S.
- Died: 9 December 2019 (aged 74); Los Angeles, California, United States
- Other names: Richard K. Weber; Rick Ely
- Occupations: Actor; Singer; Voice actor
- Years active: 1969–1990
- Spouse(s): Rayma Kristine Mattson (m. 1963; div. 1966) Jeanette Susan (m. 1987; div. 1990)
- Children: 1

Richard Ely (born Richard Kent Ely Weber; May 4, 1945 – December 9, 2019), also known as Rick Ely and Richard K. Weber, was an American actor and singer known for his roles in the television series The Young Rebels, and the soap operas Love of Life and One Life to Live. He became a teen idol in the 1970s.

== Early life ==
Richard Kent Ely Weber was born on May 4, 1945, in Terre Haute, Indiana, U.S..

== Career ==
Ely began his acting career using his birth name, but later registered with the Screen Actors Guild (SAG) under his mother's maiden name, Ely, to avoid confusion with another actor named Ron Ely. He also used the name Richard K. Weber for some of his later soap opera roles.

His breakout role came in 1970 when he starred as the lead character, Jeremy Larkin, in the short-lived ABC series The Young Rebels, appearing in all 15 episodes. During this time, Ely gained popularity as a teen idol and was featured in numerous teen magazines such as Tiger Beat, 16 Magazine, and Flip Teen Magazine. He also released a self-titled album, Rick Ely, which included the songs "Morning Girl" and "The Circle Game".

Following The Young Rebels, Ely made guest appearances on various television shows, including M*A*S*H in 1974 and co-starred in the 1973 film I Escaped from Devil's Island.

In the mid-1970s, Ely moved to New York City for a role on the soap opera Love of Life and later joined the cast of One Life to Live. He returned to California in 1982 and appeared in three films, Somewhere Tomorrow (1983), Space Rage (1985) and David (1988). He subsequently worked in voice-overs and as a paralegal for an entertainment organization.

== Personal life ==
Ely married and divorced twice. He married Rayma Kristine Mattson on August 17, 1963, and divorced in 1966. Later he married Jeanette Susan "Jenny" Bell on April 25, 1987, but they divorced in 1990. He had one daughter.

== Illness and death ==
He died on December 9, 2019, in Los Angeles, California, at the age of 74, after a long illness.

== Filmography ==
=== Television ===
Year	Title	Role	Notes
1969	My Friend Tony	Fraternity Boy	Episode: The Hazing
1970	The Young Rebels	Jeremy Larkin	as Rick Ely
1970	The Dating Game	Himself	Episode: The Young Rebels
1970	American Bandstand	Himself	as Rick Ely
1971	The Doris Day Show	Clifford Fairburn Jr.	Episode: Colonel Fairburn Jr.
1971	Marcus Welby, M.D.	Terry Kalscheur	Episode: Men Who Care
1973	Owen Marshall, Counselor at Law	Bo	Episode: The Second Victim
1973	The Streets of San Francisco	Terry Stillwell / Carpenter	Episode: Shattered Image
1974	M*A*S*H	Pvt. George Weston	Episode: George
1974	Gunsmoke	Bill Higgins	Episode: The Colonel
1976	Love of Life	Dr. Tom Crawford	as Richard K. Weber
1981	One Life to Live	Steve Piermont	7 episodes
1982	Texas	Peter Cowan	3 episodes

=== Film ===
Year	Title	Role	Notes
1969	The Whole World Is Watching	Gil Bennett	
1973	I Escaped from Devil's Island	Joe	
1974	Forgotten Island of Santosha	Narrator	as Rick Ely
1983	Somewhere Tomorrow	Alec Peiski	
1985	Space Rage	Colonel	
1988	David	Surgeon	

== Discography ==
- Rick Ely (1970, RCA Victor)
