= Adam at 6 A.M. =

1970 American film by Robert Scheerer

- original film poster
- Directed by: Robert Scheerer
- Written by: Stephen Karpf; Elinor Karpf
- Produced by: Rick Rosenberg; Robert W. Christiansen; Steve McQueen
- Starring: Michael Douglas; Lee Purcell; Joe Don Baker; Louise Latham; Charles Aidman; Grayson Hall; Marge Redmond; Dana Elcar
- Cinematography: Charles Rosher, Jr.
- Edited by: John McSweeney, Jr.
- Music by: Dave Grusin
- Production companies: Cinema Center Films; Solar Productions
- Distributed by: National General Pictures
- Release date: September 22, 1970
- Running time: 100 minutes
- Country: United States
- Language: English
- Budget: $1.4 million

Adam at 6 A.M. is a 1970 American drama film directed by Robert Scheerer. It stars Michael Douglas, Lee Purcell, Joe Don Baker, Louise Latham, Charles Aidman, Grayson Hall, Marge Redmond, and Dana Elcar. The film did not receive much attention when it was released. The film was filmed almost entirely on location in the small Midwest town of Excelsior Springs, Missouri, as well as Cameron, Missouri and Orrick, Missouri.

== Plot ==
Adam Gaines, a semantics professor at UCLA, becomes complacent in his life and hears about the death of a relative in Missouri. He drives cross-country to attend the funeral and pay his respects, deciding to spend the summer there working as a laborer. Along the way, he meets Jerri Jo Hopper and falls in love, developing new friendships with the town locals. Now, he must decide which direction he wants his life to take—whether to stay in Missouri or return to California.

== Cast ==
- Michael Douglas as Adam Gaines
- Lee Purcell as Jerri Jo Hopper
- Joe Don Baker as Harvey Gavin
- Louise Latham as Verna Hopper
- Charles Aidman as Harry Hopper
- Grayson Hall as Inez Treadley
- Marge Redmond as Cleo
- Dana Elcar as Van Treadley
- Ed Call as Orville
- Carolyn Conwell as Mavis
- Butch Youngblood as Elwood
- Greg Joseph as Ed
- Timothy Blake as Girl at Party
- Richard Derr as Roger Gaines
- Pat Randal as Pearlie
- Jo Ella Deffenbaugh as Marylist
- Sharon Marshall as Rosalie
- David Sullivan as Leroy
- Del Monroe as Mutt Peavine
- Meg Foster as Joyce
- Anne Gwynne as Gladys Gaines
- Ned Wertheimer as Dr. Peters

== Production ==
Steve McQueen's film company, Solar Productions, signed a multi-picture deal with Cinema Center Films. This was its first production.

Michael Douglas got his first paycheck, about $3,400 (equivalent to $30,000 in 2025), for Adam at 6 A.M. He also received the orange Porsche that he drove in the film directly from Steve McQueen.

== Release ==
Adam at 6 A.M. was originally released by National General Pictures in 1970, with the film's rights currently belonging to Paramount. In 1990, it was distributed on VHS by CBS/Fox Video, and in 2019, CBS and Paramount released the film on DVD.

== See also ==
- List of American films of 1970
