= The Sunshine Boys =

Play by Neil Simon that was produced on Broadway in 1972

- Window card poster, original Broadway production The Sunshine Boys starring Jack Albertson and Sam Levene
- Original language: English
- Written by: Neil Simon
- Genre: Comedy

Premiere
- Date: December 20, 1972
- Place: USA

The Sunshine Boys is an original two-act play written by Neil Simon that premiered December 20, 1972, on Broadway starring Jack Albertson as Willie Clark and Sam Levene as Al Lewis and later adapted for film and television.

== Plot ==
The play's protagonists are Al Lewis and Willie Clark. Lewis and Clark were once a successful vaudevillian comedy duo known as the Sunshine Boys. During the later years of their 43-year run, animosity between the partners grew to the point where they ceased to speak with each other. Eleven years prior to the events of the play, Al retired from show business, leaving Willie struggling to keep his career afloat.

Willie, now an old man struggling with memory loss, reluctantly accepts an offer from his nephew Ben, a talent agent, to reunite with Al for a CBS special on the history of comedy. Willie and Al meet in Willie's apartment to rehearse their classic doctor and tax collector sketch. The reunion gets off to a bad start, with the two getting into heated arguments over various aspects of the performance. However, thanks to the urging of Al's daughter, the two decide to go through with the performance.

Willie and Al's dress rehearsal at CBS' studio is derailed by Al's aggressive habit of poking Willie's chest with his index finger and spitting at him every time he says a word that has a "T" in it. One of the running gags in "The Sunshine Boys" involves Willie's resentment over having been constantly poked in the chest by his partner's all‐too‐emphatic forefinger in the course of their countless routines on stage. Willie cries, "I had a black and blue hole in my chest. He gave me the finger for 43 years!" As Al walks off the stage in regret, Willie has a heart attack as a result of his agitated state.

Two weeks later, Willie is recovering under the care of a nurse. Upon Ben's recommendation, he decides to move into an actors' retirement home in New Jersey. Al, concerned about Willie's well-being, makes a visit. When the two talk, it is revealed that Al will be moving into the same home as Willie.

Neil Simon was inspired by two venerable vaudeville teams. The longevity of "Lewis and Clark" was inspired by Smith and Dale who, unlike their theatrical counterparts, were inseparable lifelong friends. The undercurrent of backstage hostility between "Lewis and Clark" was inspired by the team of Gallagher and Shean, who were successful professionally but argumentative personally. Other sources say this is based on Weber and Fields.

== Theatre productions ==
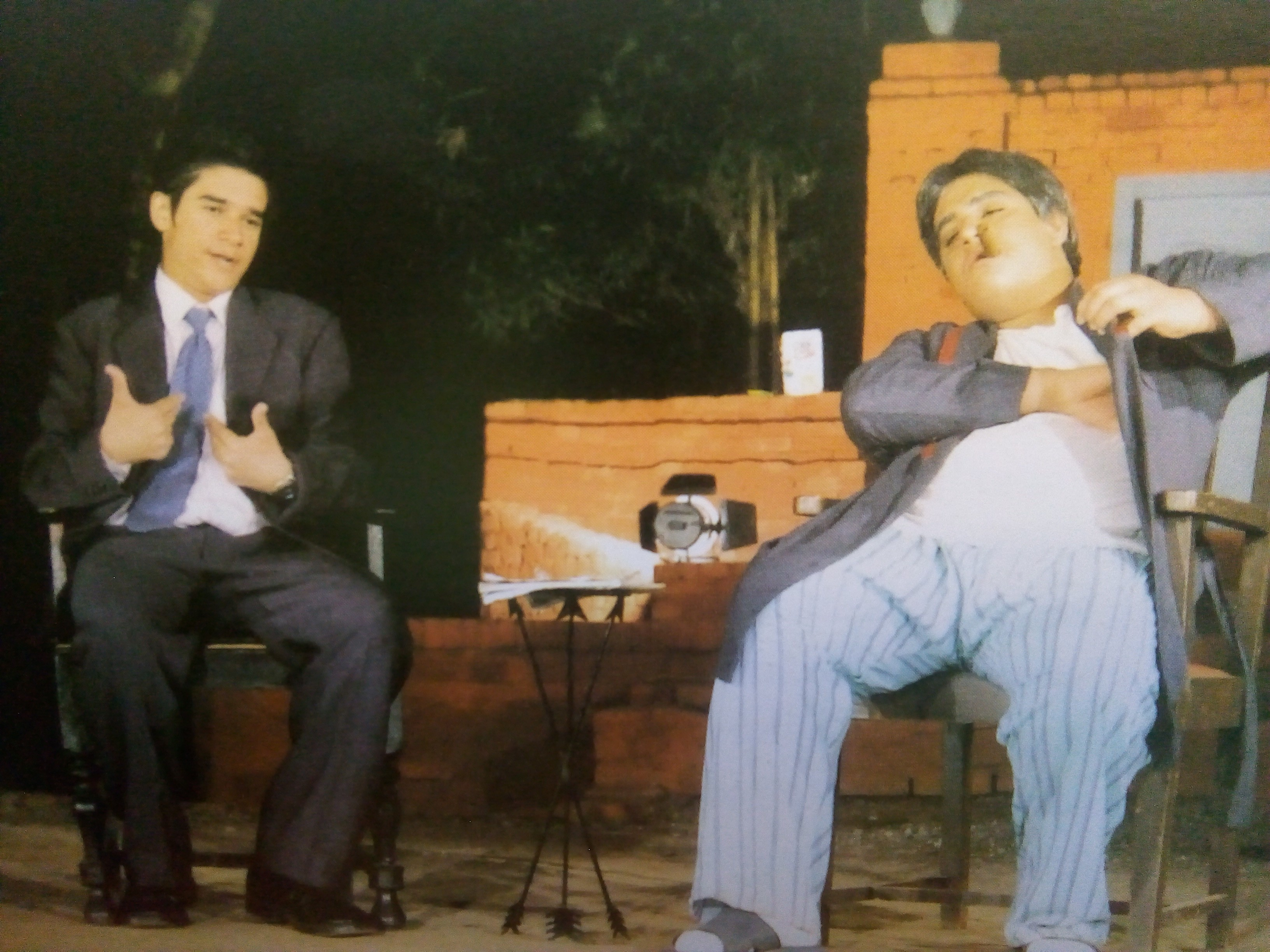
An international production at The Doon School, India.

Produced by Emanuel Azenberg and directed by Alan Arkin, the original 1972 Broadway cast starred Sam Levene as Al Lewis and Jack Albertson as Willie Clark, the vaudevillian comedy duo known as the Sunshine Boys; the play co-starred Lewis J. Stadlen as Ben, Willie Clark's nephew.

When Sam Levene and Jack Albertson departed the Broadway production to star in the first U.S. National company, they were replaced by Lou Jacobi as Al Lewis on February 12, 1974, and Jack Gilford as Willie Clark on October 30, 1973. Jacobi performed the role of Al Lewis for 72 performances. Sam Levene, the original star, is credited with performing the role of Al Lewis 466 times in the original Broadway production before headlining the first U.S. national tour.

Tony Award nominations went to Simon (Best Play), Albertson (Best Actor in a Play) and Arkin (Best Direction of a Play), and Albertson won the Drama Desk Award for Outstanding Performance (and was nominated for a Tony as well). Al Hirschfeld memorialized the legendary starring performances of Jack Albertson as Willie Clark and Sam Levene as Al Lewis, the original Broadway stars of The Sunshine Boys, by creating an iconic caricature for The New York Times on December 13, 1972. Titled "Don't Poke With The Finger" the caricature references the finger poke running gag and Willie Clark's resentment over having been constantly and aggressively poked during the show and for 43 years by Al Lewis played by Sam Levene.

The 1972 production of The Sunshine Boys marked the beginning of Neil Simon's long association with producer Emanuel Azenberg, who produced all of Simon's original Broadway plays and musicals that followed.

Clive Barnes, The New York Times chief theatre critic, reviewed the original Broadway production on December 21, 1972, stating: "The Sunshine Boys is probably Mr. Simon's best play yet. It deals with a subject very dear to the playwright's heart—vaudeville. Willie Clark is an almost retired vaudeville comedian. His heart is willing, but his lines are failing. His agent is his nephew—long‐suffering and much‐loving. But even a potato‐chip commercial has not gone well, and any actor who cannot crunch potato chips has got to be on his way out."

Regarding the original Broadway stars, Barnes stated: "Jack Albertson as the heart stricken comic never puts a line wrong. He is always pathetic but never enough to make you cry. Lovely. His acerbic partner, Sam Levene, is as tough as vintage chewing gum, and yet with a sort of credible lovability."

Albertson and Levene won unanimous rave notices for their starring performances in the original Broadway production of The Sunshine Boys. Until the play went into rehearsal, Albertson and Levene had never met. Director Alan Arkin recalled in an interview with The New York Times, "Now they work as collaboratively as did Smith and Dale, the legendary team on which "The Sunshine Boys" is partly based." Arkin said "Jack (Albertson) and Sam (Levene) would have these terrific yelling matches". "It used to scare hell out of everybody until we realized that it meant nothing. They were mock battles, completely without anger. They're consummate professionals." Albertson interjected: "There is a 'chemical' between the two". "He knows what I think; and I know what he thinks," Albertson told The New York Times. "Sam and I have the same thing in the play. If one of us blows a line, the other covers. Frankly, I blow more lines than Sam does." The two pros were able to cover lines as they each knew the play, not just their roles. New York Post Theatre Critic Richard Watts Jr. observed "Jack Albertson and Sam Levene offer the best team acting since Gielgud and Richardson in Home".

The play was revived on Broadway at the Lyceum Theatre, opening on December 8, 1997, and closing on June 28, 1998, after 230 performances. Directed by John Tillinger, the cast starred Jack Klugman as Willie Clark and Tony Randall as Al Lewis.

A West End production of the play, starring Danny DeVito (in his West End debut)) and Richard Griffiths, opened on May 17, 2012, and played a limited 12-week season until July 28.

Griffiths was later replaced by DeVito's "Taxi" co-star, Judd Hirsch. In a 2013 review of the Hirsch/DeVito cast at the Ahmanson Theatre, Myron Meisel observed: "It's been more than 40 years since The Sunshine Boys first graced Broadway (with the still unimprovable Jack Albertson and Sam Levene), nearly as long in the tooth as the "Smith and Dale" sketch "Dr. Kronkheit and His Only Living Patient" was when this show was new. Simon fashioned a new, improved update on the routine for his fictional team of Lewis & Clark (Hirsch & DeVito), and his knowledgeable ear for what was then vintage and is now antique humor allows him to bring these anachronistic stylings into a then-contemporary comic setting without compromising the integrity of their original zingy ballsiness".

=== West End cast ===
- Danny DeVito – Willie Clark
- Richard Griffiths – Al Lewis
- Adam Levy – Ben Silverman
- William Maxwell – Patient & Understudy Willie
- Peter Cadden – Voice of TV Director & Understudy Al and Patient
- Nick Blakeley – Eddie & Understudy Ben
- Rebecca Blackstone – Miss MacKintosh
- Johnnie Fiori – Registered Nurse
- Oliver Stoney – Understudy Eddie & TV Director
- Clementine Marlowe-Hunt – Miss MacKintosh & Registered Nurse

== Adaptations ==
=== American versions ===
The 1975 feature film
Stars George Burns as Lewis and Walter Matthau as Clark. The Sunshine Boys was Burns' first film appearance in 36 years and he won the Best Supporting Actor Oscar for his performance.

1977 TV pilot
Stars Lionel Stander as Lewis and Red Buttons as Clark. The pilot was not picked up for a series, but was broadcast by NBC on June 9, 1977.

The 1996 TV movie
Stars Woody Allen as Lewis and Peter Falk as Clark. Neil Simon adapted his play for Hallmark Entertainment. Directed by John Erman, it was not broadcast until December 28, 1997. Other performers include Michael McKean, Liev Schreiber, Edie Falco, Sarah Jessica Parker, and Whoopi Goldberg in supporting roles. Simon's teleplay updated the setting and made the two comedians the product of the early days of television, the medium in which the playwright got his start. Unlike the film adaptation, although they are portrayed as cantankerous, their animosity was not as severe as Matthau's and Burns' characters' bad relationship.

== Awards and nominations ==
=== Original Broadway production ===
Year	Award	Category	Nominee	Result
1973	Drama Desk Award	Outstanding Performance	Jack Albertson	Won
1973	Tony Awards	Best Play		Nominated
1973	Tony Awards	Best Actor in a Play	Jack Albertson	Nominated
1973	Tony Awards	Best Direction of a Play	Alan Arkin	Nominated
