= Killing at Hell's Gate =

- Genre: Drama
- Written by: Lee Hutson
- Directed by: Jerry Jameson
- Starring: Robert Urich; Deborah Raffin; Lee Purcell; Joel Higgins; George DiCenzo; Paul Burke
- Theme music composer: David Bell
- Country of origin: United States
- Original language: English

Production
- Producer: Ron Roth
- Cinematography: Bill Butler
- Editor: John F. Link
- Running time: 96 minutes
- Production company: CBS Entertainment Production

Original release
- Network: CBS
- Release: October 31, 1981

Killing at Hell's Gate is a 1981 American made-for-television film directed by Jerry Jameson and starring Robert Urich, Deborah Raffin and Lee Purcell. The film premiered on CBS on October 31, 1981.

== Cast ==
- Robert Urich
- Deborah Raffin
- Lee Purcell

== Reception ==
The New York Times said "Much of the film is devoted to Mr. Urich as he tries to bring the rafting party to safety. Periodically, there is romance. There is even some talk about the disappearing blue herons. But the driving force behind this adventure yarn is the scenery."

The Los Angeles Times called it a "routine adventure yarn" with a "good cast and suspenseful finale".
