= Homework (1982 film) =

1982 comedy film

- Theatrical release poster
- Directed by: James Beshears
- Written by: Maurice Peterson; Don Safran
- Produced by: James Beshears
- Starring: Joan Collins; Shell Kepler; Lee Purcell; Carrie Snodgress; Wings Hauser; Betty Thomas
- Cinematography: Paul Goldsmith
- Edited by: Allen Persselin
- Music by: Tony Jones; Jim Witzel
- Production company: Jensen Farley Pictures
- Release date: August 27, 1982
- Running time: 90 minutes
- Country: United States
- Language: English
- Box office: $2.9–4 million

Homework is a 1982 American comedy film directed by James Beshears and starring Joan Collins. The film was marketed with the tagline "Every young man needs a teacher."

== Summary ==
Homework tells the story of Tommy, a young rock star who is also a virgin. As he tries to lose his virginity to local high school girls, a classmate's mother decides to make a man of him.

== Cast ==
- Joan Collins as Diana
- Michael Morgan as Tommy
- Shell Kepler as Lisa
- Lanny Horn as Ralph
- Erin Donovan as Sheila
- Lee Purcell as Ms. Jackson
- Renée Harris as Cookie
- Mark Brown as Mix
- Steve Gustafson as John
- Carrie Snodgress as Dr. Delingua
- Wings Hauser as Reddog
- Betty Thomas as Reddog's secretary

== Lawsuits ==
The day before the film's premiere, it was reported that Joan Collins, Betty Thomas, Carrie Snodgress and Lee Purcell had all taken legal action to get their names removed from the credits. Collins claimed that the film's advertising was misleading because she had only performed in a minor supporting role shot two years earlier, but a sex scene had been added afterward using a body double to cash in on her new celebrity status from the hit TV show Dynasty. The other three performers claimed they had been under a false impression about the kind of film they were making. Collins' attorneys won a partial victory when a federal court ordered Jensen Farley Pictures to stop using ads that depicted Collins nude.

== Reception ==
Variety called the film "a very poorly-made sex comedy" with "plentiful post-production doctoring" in evidence. Gene Siskel of the Chicago Tribune gave the film zero stars out of four, declaring: "A miserable excuse for a movie. One of the year's worst." Dale Pollock wrote in the Los Angeles Times that the film was marred by "poor photography, sloppy editing and atrocious acting," and that the body double in the sex scene "doesn't even resemble Collins." On review aggregator website Rotten Tomatoes, the film holds no Tomatometer score (due to having only three critic reviews, all of which are Rotten); however, 5% of audiences gave the film a positive review based on over 250 ratings. Audiences polled by CinemaScore gave the film a rare average grade of "F" on an A+ to F scale, making it the first of only 23 films to have ever received this grade.
