= Addison Powell =

American actor

- Powell in Dark Shadows
- Born: February 23, 1921; Belmont, Massachusetts, U.S.
- Died: November 8, 2010 (aged 89); Shelburne, Vermont, U.S.
- Education: Boston University (BA); Yale University (MFA)
- Occupation: Actor
- Years active: 1951–1990
- Spouse: Bunnie Rowley (m. 1950; died 1995)
- Children: 3

Addison Powell (February 23, 1921 – November 8, 2010) was an American actor whose numerous television, stage and film credits included Dark Shadows, The Thomas Crown Affair and Three Days of the Condor. He was best known for playing Dr. Eric Lang, a mad scientist who created Adam, on Dark Shadows.

== Early life ==
Powell was born in 1921 in Belmont, Massachusetts. His parents, Edward Henry and Kathrene (née Barnum) Powell, were school teachers. Powell received a bachelor's degree from Boston University. He enlisted in the U.S. Army Air Force as a navigator during World War II. Powell ultimately flew more than 30 combat missions as a navigator on board B-17 bombers from their base in East Anglia, the United Kingdom. He earned a second degree from the Yale School of Drama (class of 1948) following the end of the war.

== Career ==
Powell's film credits included The Mating Game (1959) with Debbie Reynolds, In the French Style (1963) with Jean Seberg, and The Thomas Crown Affair (1968), the latter in which he played Abe, a bank robber, opposite Steve McQueen. In 1975, Powell appeared in The Reincarnation of Peter Proud with Michael Sarrazin, and played a rogue CIA officer in Three Days of the Condor, which starred Robert Redford. He portrayed Admiral Chester W. Nimitz in the 1977 biopic, MacArthur, which starred Gregory Peck, and later appeared in the 1987 murder mystery film The Rosary Murders, opposite Donald Sutherland and Charles Durning.

His television credits included roles in the first seasons of both Law & Order and The Mod Squad. Powell also had a recurring role as Dr. Eric Lang in the television series Dark Shadows, which aired on ABC from 1966 until 1971. He guest-starred in an episode of Gibbsville in 1976 and co-starred as a detective in the 1977 television film, Contract on Cherry Street, with Frank Sinatra and Martin Balsam. In 1988 he appeared as Admiral Harold Stark in the miniseries War and Remembrance, opposite Robert Mitchum. He also portrayed the Gorton's Fisherman in Gorton's Fish Commercials in 1982.

== Personal life ==
In 1950, Powell married Bunnie Rowley. The couple had three children: Mary, Julie and Michael. The family resided on the Upper West Side of Manhattan. They remained married until Rowley's death in 1995.

== Death ==
Addison Powell died on November 8, 2010, at 89 years old. Powell had resided in Vermont for twenty-two years, most recently at the Shelburne Bay Senior Living community in Shelburne.

== Filmography ==
Year	Title	Role	Notes
1959	The Mating Game	David DeGroot	
1961	The Young Doctors	Board Physician	Uncredited
1963	In the French Style	Mr. James - Christina's Father	
1968	The Thomas Crown Affair	Abe	
1975	The Reincarnation of Peter Proud	Reeves	
1975	Three Days of the Condor	Atwood	
1977	MacArthur	Admiral Nimitz	
1978	Curse of Kilimanjaro		
1987	The Rosary Murders	Father Edward Killeen	
