= Pussycat, Pussycat, I Love You =

1970 American film by Rod Amateau

- Theatrical release poster
- Directed by: Rod Amateau
- Written by: Rod Amateau
- Produced by: Jerry Bresler
- Starring: Ian McShane; Anna Calder-Marshall; John Gavin; Severn Darden; Joyce Van Patten
- Cinematography: Tonino Delli Colli
- Edited by: Larry Heath
- Music by: Lalo Schifrin
- Production company: Three Pictures Corporation
- Distributed by: United Artists
- Release date: March 25, 1970
- Running time: 99 minutes
- Country: United States
- Language: English

Pussycat, Pussycat, I Love You is a 1970 American comedy film directed by Rod Amateau. Intended as a sequel to the 1965 film What's New Pussycat?, it stars Ian McShane, Anna Calder-Marshall, John Gavin and Severn Darden.

== Plot ==
A neurotic American living in Rome consults with an equally neurotic psychiatrist about his various fears, and the disintegrating relationship with his wife.

== Cast ==
- Ian McShane as Fred Dobbs
- Anna Calder-Marshall as Millie
- John Gavin as Charlie
- Severn Darden as Dr. Fahrquardt
- Joyce Van Patten as Anna
- Beba Lončar as Ornella
- Veronica Carlson as Liz
- Ian Trigger as Dr. Ponti
- Katia Christine as Angelica
- Gaby André as Flavia
- Marino Masé as Franco
- Daniël Sola as Fernando
- Dari Lallou as Hesther
- Linda Morand as Moira
- Madeline Smith as Gwendolyn
- Maurizio Lucidi as Director
- Leopoldo Trieste as Desk Clerk

== Production ==
Filming began in Rome in mid-1969. It was shot at Cinecittà Studios and on location around the city.

The music was composed by Lalo Schifrin.

== Reception ==
The Los Angeles Times said the film falls down with "a thud".

== See also ==
- List of American films of 1970
