= Lee Purcell =

American actress (born 1947)

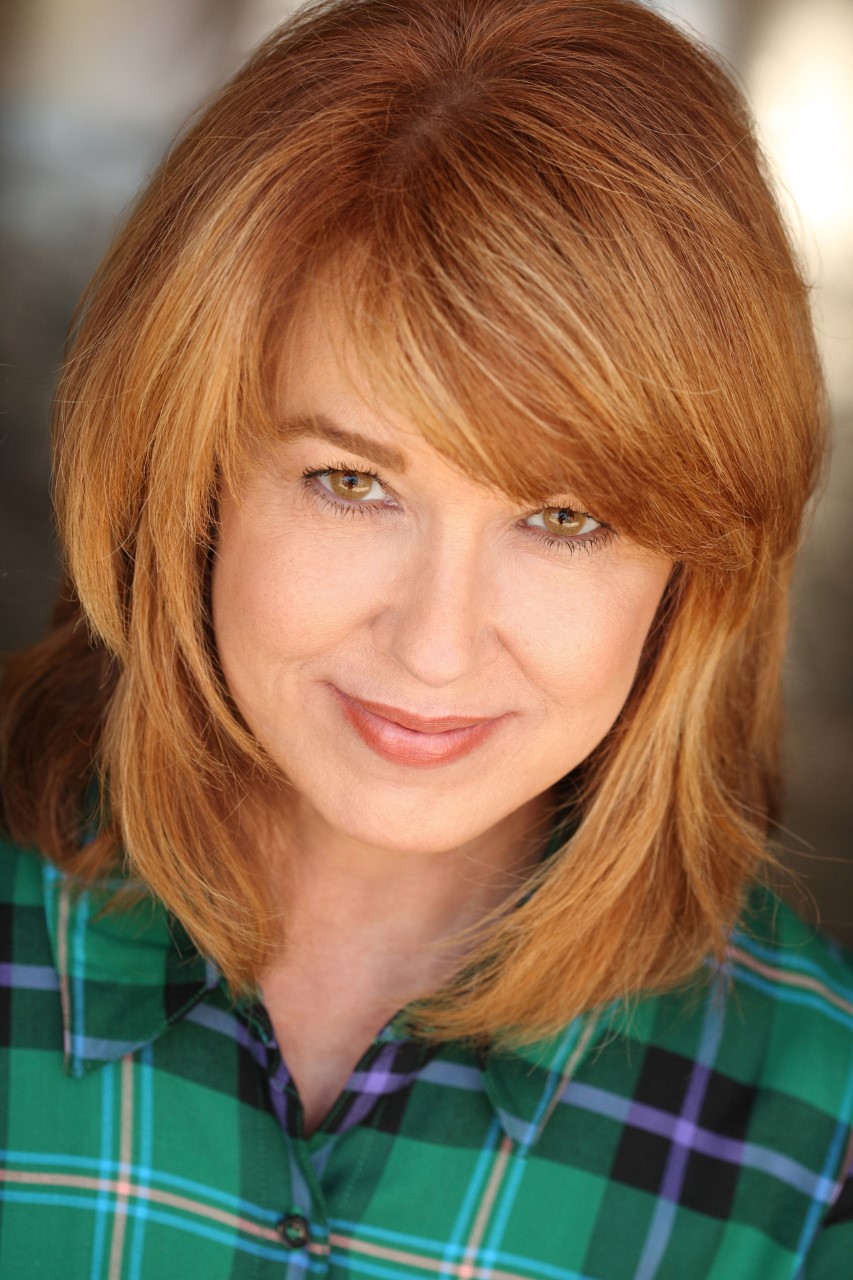
- Purcell in 2017
- Born: Lee Jeune Williams; June 15, 1947 (age 79); Marine Corps Air Station Cherry Point, North Carolina, U.S.
- Occupation: Actress
- Years active: 1969–present
- Spouses: Robert Gibson (m. 1968; div. 1972) Kenneth Gerbino (m. 1975; div. 1981) Gary A. Lowe (m. 1982; div. 1995) Bob Dahlquist (m. 2014)
- Website: www.leepurcell.com

Lee Purcell (born Lee Jeune Williams; June 15, 1947) is an American actress who worked primarily in the 1970s and 1980s.

== Early life ==
Purcell was born Lee Jeune Williams at the Marine Corps Air Station Cherry Point (North Carolina), the elder daughter of Major Frank D. Williams Jr., a decorated Marine Corps pilot who was killed while on active duty when she was two months old. Her mother, Lee (née McKnight) Williams, remarried, to Donald Purcell, a U.S. Navy doctor assigned to the Marine Corps. Lee Purcell has a younger sister.

She graduated from Paragould High School in 1965 and briefly attended Stephens College in Columbia, Missouri as a dance and theatre student until she was expelled.

== Career ==
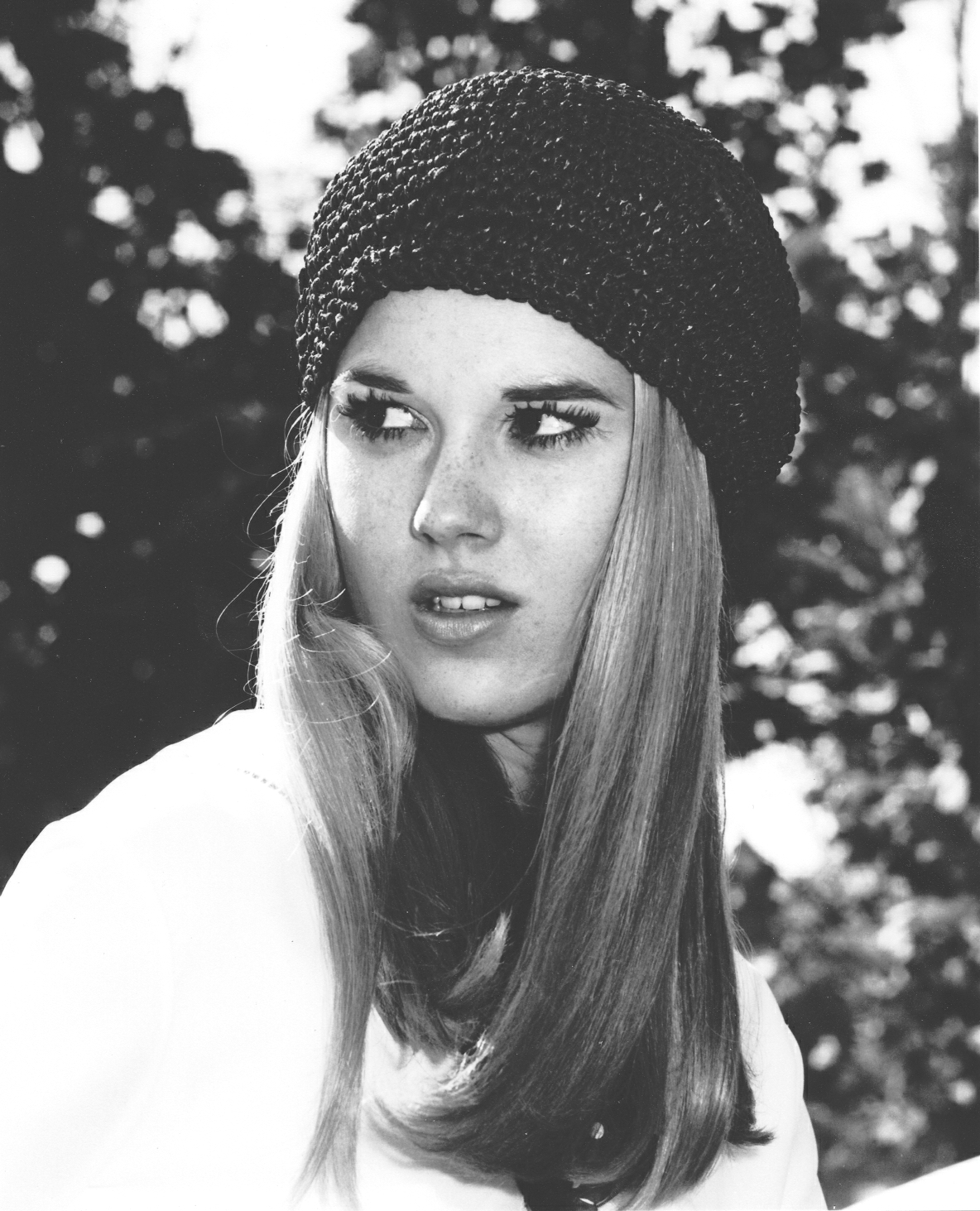
Purcell in 1970

She moved to California in 1967 and studied acting. Purcell supported herself by working in commercials and selling clothes at a disco.

In 1969, Purcell was selected for her first feature film by Steve McQueen in his company's production of Adam at Six A.M., co-starring Michael Douglas. Asked to explain why he chose Purcell from nearly 500 other available actresses, McQueen said, "It wasn't easy. We kept narrowing down the field over a period of weeks until it came to giving screen tests to six of them. All of them were good, but Lee seemed to jump right out of the screen."

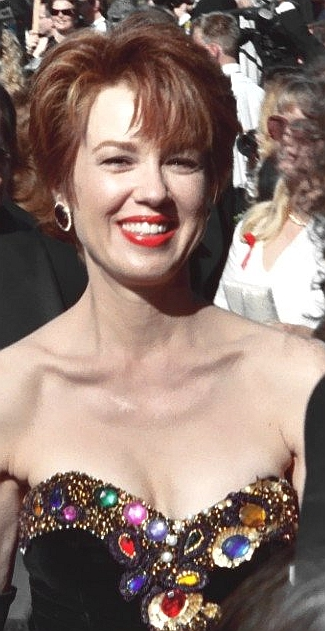
Purcell at the 1994 Emmy Awards

Her television work included roles as Billie Dove and Olivia de Havilland in two biopic TV movies: The Amazing Howard Hughes (1977) and My Wicked, Wicked Ways: The Legend of Errol Flynn (1985).

She was nominated for two Emmy Awards. In 1991, she was nominated as Outstanding Lead Actress for Long Road Home and in 1994 as Outstanding Supporting Actress for Secret Sins of the Father. She was co-producer, and starred in the 1998 low-budget cable-TV movie Malaika (alternate title Tons of Trouble).

Purcell's film career wound down in 1983 and she has only had five motion picture credits since, the last in 2015. She has continued to do television projects.

== Personal life ==
In December 2010, Purcell launched an interactive fashion and beauty website, BoomerBabes, geared towards Baby Boomer women. The website gained few visitors and BoomerBabes stopped updating in 2014.

Purcell is a member of the Church of Scientology.

== Filmography ==
=== Feature films ===
Year	Film	Role	Director
1970	Adam at Six A.M.	Jerri Jo Hopper	Robert Scheerer
1972	Dirty Little Billy	Berle	Stan Dragoti
1972	Stand Up and Be Counted	Karen Hammond	Jackie Cooper
1972	Necromancy	Priscilla	Bert I. Gordon
1973	Kid Blue	Molly Ford	James Frawley
1974	Mr. Majestyk	Wiley	Richard Fleischer
1978	Big Wednesday	Peggy Gordon	John Milius
1978	Almost Summer	Christine Alexander	Martin Davidson
1980	Stir Crazy	Susan	Sidney Poitier
1982	Airplane II: The Sequel	Mrs. Seluchi (Deleted Scene)	Ken Finkleman
1982	Homework	Ms. Jackson	James Beshears
1983	Eddie Macon's Run	Jilly Buck	Jeff Kanew
1983	Valley Girl	Beth Brent	Martha Coolidge
1985	Space Rage	Maggie	Conrad E. Palmisano
1993	Movies, Money, Murder	Lilah	Stephen Eckelberry, Arthur Webb
1998	Dizzyland		Dennis Hackin
2005	The Unknown aka Clawed: The Legend of Sasquatch	Doris Winslow	Karl Kozak
2015	Kids vs Monsters	Francine Gingerfield	
2019	Carol of the Bells	Lilliane	

=== Television ===
Year	Title	Role	Notes
1969	Bracken's World	Girl	
1970	Marcus Welby, M.D.	Cathy Cullen	Made a second appearance in 1972, as 'Carol Lockett'
1970	Bonanza	Angie	
1970	The Young Rebels	Maggie Todd	
1972	Medical Center	Liza	
1973	Cannon	Marian Luke	Made two additional appearances in 1975, various characters
1973	Hijack	Eileen Noonan	TV movie
1974	ABC Wide World Mystery	Donna	
1974	The Rockford Files	Susan Parsons	S1 E13, "The Dexter Files"
1975	The Waltons	Bobby Strom	Played a “wing walker”
1975	Insight	Tracy	
1975	Barnaby Jones	Kathy Cooper	Made a second appearance in 1977, as 'Peggy Giroux'
1976	Hawaii Five-O	Molly Taggert	Made a second appearance in 1977, same character
1976	Jigsaw John	Virginia Sand	
1977	The Amazing Howard Hughes	Billie Dove	TV movie
1977	The Streets of San Francisco	Carol Revson	
1978	Stranger in Our House	Julia Trent	TV movie (aka Summer of Fear)
1979	Murder in Music City	Samantha Hunt	TV movie (aka The Country Western Murders)
1979	A Man Called Sloane	Michele Blake	
1980	Kenny Rogers as The Gambler	Jennie Reed	TV movie
1980	My Wife Next Door	Lisa Pallick	Pilot for proposed TV series
1980	The Secret War of Jackie's Girls	Casey McCann	TV movie
1981	The Girl, the Gold Watch & Dynamite	Bonnie Lee Beaumont	TV movie and pilot for proposed TV series
1981	Killing at Hell's Gate	Jane Pasco	TV movie
1982	The Phoenix	Cindy Houghton	
1985	Magnum, P.I.	Goldie Morris	
1985	Murder, She Wrote	Joanna Benson	Made four additional appearances in 1986, 1989 and 1994, various characters
1985	My Wicked, Wicked Ways: The Legend of Errol Flynn	Olivia de Havilland	TV movie
1985	Hollywood Beat	Maggie	
1986	Betrayed by Innocence	Sharon DeLeon	TV movie
1987	Matlock	Andrea Colter	
1987	MacGyver	Shadow	
1988	To Heal a Nation	Sandie	TV movie
1988	The Incredible Hulk Returns	Dr. Maggie Shaw	TV movie
1988	Jake and the Fatman	Pamela Parker	
1989	Simon & Simon	Colleen Huntley/Missy Taylor	
1990	Shades of LA	Alex Taylor	
1991	Long Road Home	Bessie Robertson	TV movie. Emmy nomination for Outstanding Lead Actress
1994	Secret Sins of the Father	Ann Thielman	TV movie. Emmy nomination for Outstanding Supporting Actress
1995	Due South	Louise St. Laurent	Made five additional appearances in 1995 and 1996, same character
1995	Dazzle	Red	TV movie
1995	The Magic of Christmas	Herself	Holiday special
1997	Beyond Belief: Fact or Fiction	Dr. Kim O'Farrell	Segment: "The Unknown Patient"
1998	Promised Land	Beth Hixon	
1998	Malaika	Molly DeMornay	TV movie (aka Tons of Trouble)
2010	Persons Unknown	Eleanor Sullivan	Mini-series. Five appearances
2016	J.L. Family Ranch	Mable Ritter	TV film
2017	Love at First Glance	Susan	TV film
2018	Sick	Gretchen	TV film

=== Special projects ===
Year	Title	Role	Notes
1987	A Woman's Guide to Firearms	Herself	Instructional video
1987	Your First Gun- A Family Guide To Shooting	The mother	Instructional video
1992	The Joke	Jane	35mm short
1997	This World, Then the Fireworks		ADR work (additional dialogue recording)
2006	White Picket Fence	Bonnie Durley	Super 16mm short
