= Green Eyes (1977 film) =

1977 American made-for-television war drama film

- Genre: War; Drama
- Written by: Eugene Logan; David Seltzer
- Directed by: John Erman
- Starring: Paul Winfield; Rita Tushingham; Jonathan Goldsmith; Victoria Racimo; Lemi
- Theme music composer: Fred Karlin
- Country of origin: United States
- Original language: English

Production
- Executive producers: Philip Capice; Lee Rich
- Producers: John Erman; David Seltzer
- Production location: Philippines
- Cinematography: Terry K. Meade
- Editor: John W. Wheeler
- Running time: 100 minutes
- Production company: Lorimar Productions

Original release
- Network: ABC
- Release: January 3, 1977

Green Eyes is a 1977 American made-for-television war drama film directed by John Erman and written by Eugene Logan and David Seltzer. It is a "touching and moving story" about a Vietnam veteran Lloyd Dubeck (Paul Winfield) who went through a soul searching journey.

The film was produced by Lorimar Productions and broadcast on ABC. The film won a Peabody Award and a Humanitas Prize in 1977.

== Plot ==
Lloyd Dubeck is a Vietnam veteran wounded both physically and psychologically. Released from a VA hospital, walking with a cane, Lloyd can’t find work and can’t seem to fit in. Lloyd's mother has saved up all the money that Lloyd sent her from his Army pay, plus what she earned as a cleaning woman, to enable him go to college and get a degree. Instead, Lloyd decides to return to Saigon to search for a Vietnamese woman, Em Thuy with whom he fathered a child he has never seen. The only thing he knows about his child, thanks to a single letter from Em Thuy, is that it’s a boy with green eyes.

While in Vietnam, Lloyd meets an orphan named Trung who informs Lloyd that he is his son and that he has been looking for him, pointing out the resemblance in their skin color but then tricks Lloyd and steals some of his money and his jacket. However, Trung later helps Lloyd in searching for his child by re-connecting him with an old army buddy, Noel Cousins who has faked his death to desert the Army and is living the good life in Vietnam. Cousins advises Lloyd in the best way to go about searching for Em Thuy.

Lloyd befriends a woman named Margaret Sheen who runs a "reception center" for orphans who are lucky enough to have been adopted. Margaret informs Lloyd that there's little hope for finding his child, saying that mixed-race children and their mothers are shunned in Vietnamese society and that eventually many of the children are abandoned and die. She tells Lloyd that his search for his own child is pointless, saying, "If you want a child, reach out. They're all yours, all of them." Going through several orphanages in Saigon and seeing thousands of Vietnam street children, Lloyd devotes his time and the rest of his money to helping the orphaned children, befriending Margaret in the process.

During the search for Em Thuy and his child, Trung accompanies Lloyd, telling the people they meet that Lloyd is his father. Cousins eventually informs Lloyd of the whereabouts of Em Thuy. Trung accompanies Lloyd to the shantytown where she lives, saying he'll wait for him. Lloyd learns that his son with Em Thuy is dead and she has a baby from another American serviceman. Lloyd emerges from Em Thuy's hut to find Trung gone. In despair and out of money, Lloyd decides to return home alone, thinking that Trung can take care of himself. On his way to the airport, however, he realizes his attachment to Trung and goes searching for him. Lloyd finds Trung, who says he saw green eyes when looking in the mirror. The epilogue says Trung was one of the last orphans allowed to leave Saigon.

== Cast ==
- Paul Winfield as Lloyd Dubeck
- Rita Tushingham as Margaret Sheen
- Jonathan Goldsmith as Noel Cousins
- Victoria Racimo as Em Thuy
- Lemi as Trung
- Royce Wallace as Mrs. Dubeck
- Robert DoQui as Hal
- Fred Sadoff as VA Officer
- Dabbs Greer as Mr. Cousins
- Claudia Bryar as Mrs. Cousins
- Jester Hairston as Dirk Dubeck
- Vernee Watson as Rosalee Dubeck
- Buck Young as Policeman
