= Kelli Lidell =

American singer-songwriter

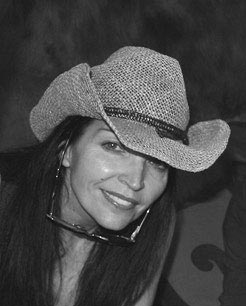

Background information
- Genres: Country, country pop, alternative country
- Occupations: Singer, charity fundraiser
- Website: Kelli Lidell Website

Kelli Lidell is an American country singer and charity fundraiser based in Los Angeles, California.

== Biography ==
Kelli Lidell made her musical debut at age four by singing with her dad, the then-rising country music singer Johnny Lidell who was briefly famous for his 1964 hit "Primrose Lane." On Christmas Day in 1973, depressed over his stagnant career, Johnny Lidell committed suicide leaving Kelli with his last words: "Follow your dreams."

Kelli became an actress on the TV series The Life and Times of Grizzly Adams and a rising country singer in her own right. Only days after being offered a recording contract by CBS, tragedy struck when Lidell suffered a near-fatal car crash in which doctors predicted she would never again walk or talk. Ten years later, after excruciating physical therapy, Kelli had recovered her ability to walk, talk, and even sing.

== The Second Chance Foundation ==
Kelli founded the non-profit "Second Chance Foundation," in honor of people like herself who were given a second chance at pursuing their lifelong dreams. The foundation's Hollywood fund-raisers were noted by the media to be star-studded events that included celebrities Eddie Murphy, Al Pacino, Garth Brooks, Nine Inch Nails, Gloria Estefan, and Jack Nicholson.

Among those helped by the foundation was the nearly paralyzed musician Moon Calhoun and childhood burn victim David Rothenberg

== Music ==
Kelli Lidell released the albums "His Heart and Mine" in 1999 and "Someone to Love" in 2000. In 2006, Kelli assembled a new band The Shadowmen. They are touring North America in 2008 and their latest songs can be found on their website.

== Filmography ==
- The Life and Times of Grizzly Adams (1977) (TV) (Actress)
- The Legend of Wolf Mountain (1993) (Assistant Director)
- Teenage Bonnie and Klepto Clyde (1993) (Location manager)
- Little Heroes (1992) (TV) (Voice Actress)
