= Space Rage =

Space Rage: Breakout on Prison Planet
- Poster for the film's original version
- Directed by: Conrad E. Palmisano
- Screenplay by: Jim Lenahan
- Story by: Morton Reed
- Produced by: Morton Reed
- Starring: Richard Farnsworth; Michael Paré; John Laughlin; Lee Purcell; William Windom
- Cinematography: Tom Richmond; Tim Suhrstedt
- Edited by: Arthur J. Bressan Jr.; W. Peter Miller
- Music by: Billy Ferrick; Zander Schloss
- Production companies: Vestron Entertainment; Morton Reed Productions
- Distributed by: Vestron Pictures
- Release date: November 21, 1986; (Space Rage version)
- Running time: 77 minutes
- Country: United States
- Language: English
- Budget: $3.2–3.5 million (before reshoots)

Space Rage: Breakout on Prison Planet is a 1985 American space Western film directed by Conrad E. Palmisano and starring Richard Farnsworth, Michael Paré, John Laughlin, Lee Purcell and William Windom. Some promotional materials have used the abridged title Space Rage. The original version of the film, Trackers, only received a test release and was not widely seen.

== Plot ==
Two centuries in the future, a dangerous lunatic named Grange is sentenced to a penal colony, Botany Bay, on the planet Proxima Centauri 3. There, a bounty hunter and an ex-policeman team up to prevent him from escaping.

== Cast ==
- Richard Farnsworth as Colonel
- Michael Paré as Grange
- John Laughlin as Walker
- Lee Purcell as Maggie
- William Windom as Gov. Tovah
- Lewis Van Bergen as Drago
- Frank Doubleday as Brain Surgeon
- Dennis Redfield as Quinn
- Harold Sylvester as Max Bryson
- Wolfe Perry as Billy Boy
- Ricky Supiran as Kirk
- Nick Palmisano as Carny
- Rick Weber as Nose
- Richard Ely as Colonel
- Eddie Pansullo as Mean guard
- Paul Linke as Duffy
- Gene Hartline as Bubba
- Allan Graf as Tiny
- Paul Keith as Dr. Wehiberg
- R.J. Ganzert as Tallahassee
- Jim Bentley as Bob Smith
- Susan Madigan as Mary Smith
- William Cowley as Charlie

== Production ==
The film was the brainchild of Beverly Hills psychologist Morton Reed. During a luncheon with film industry friends Roger Corman and Elliott Slutzky, he heard them complain about how hard it was to find fresh concepts. Reed, who had moonlighted as a writer, told them on a dare that he could easily come up with an exciting movie. He formed his own company Morton Reed Productions and found a partner in Vestron, a distributor of genre films looking to branch out into production. His project was the most expensive of Vestron's initial three-picture slate, which also comprised two chillers from Friday the 13th producer Steve Minasian, Don't Scream: It's Only a Movie! and April Fool's Day (later renamed Slaughter High). The film's budget was initially estimated between $3.2 million and $3.5 million. It was helmed by stunt coordinator Conrad Palmisano, in his main unit directorial debut.

Principal photography began on January 26, 1985. During a personal appearance in early March, Farnsworth confirmed that he had just wrapped up work on the film. The movie was shot under the title A Dollar a Day. Shortly after however, it had been re-titled to Trackers: 2180 or just Trackers. Some sources mention another considered title, The Last Frontier. Farnsworth, who was disappointed with his previous performance and contemplating retirement, expressed satisfaction with the picture. Reed conceded that he had been surprised by the demands of filmmaking, saying: "It's incredible, such hard hours, that I don't think there can be a really, totally bad filmmaker in the world. If you finish, you're a hero. No matter how you did it, it's incredible." Following test screenings however, Reed's efforts fell short of expectations and the movie was ordered to undergo reshoots, which were directed by production executive Peter McCarthy.

== Release ==
=== Theatrical ===
The film received a theatrical premiere in Stamford, Connecticut, the hometown of production company Vestron, on Christmas 1985. By early 1986, it was still being promoted as Trackers: 2180. It was then shelved and retooled before its actual release as Space Rage in Ohio, starting on November 21, 1986. However, there is no indication that it ever expanded to other markets.

=== Home media ===
The film was released on Betamax and VHS cassettes via Vestron subsidiary Lightning Video on July 21, 1987.

== Reception ==
The Variety reviewer identified as Lor. was negative, opining: "Special effects are meager and there is almost no futurism to the picture's design, an instant disappointment for sci-fi fans. A good cast is wasted, particularly Lee Purcell." He summed up the film as a "clunker." Leonard Maltin wrote that Farnsworth "should've turned [his laser-beam six-shooter] on the negative of this bomb." Sister publications The Motion Picture Annual and TV Guide called it "an uneasy blend of science fiction and western," although they praised the unconventional casting of Paré as a villain. Bantam Books' Movies on TV and Videocassette felt that "futuristic trappings fail to enliven this tired shoot-'em-up."

== Soundtrack ==
The soundtrack includes song by alternative rock bands The Spikes, The Screaming Believers, Exploding White Mice, Dream Syndicate and Blood Money.
