= David (1988 film) =

- Genre: Drama
- Based on: David by Marie Rothenberg; Mel White
- Screenplay by: Stephanie Liss
- Directed by: John Erman
- Starring: Bernadette Peters; John Glover; Dan Lauria; Matthew Lawrence
- Music by: Marvin Hamlisch
- Country of origin: United States
- Original language: English

Production
- Producer: Donald March
- Cinematography: Steve Yanconelli
- Editor: James Galloway
- Running time: 120 minutes
- Production companies: Donald March Productions; ITC Entertainment

Original release
- Network: ABC
- Release: October 25, 1988

David is a 1988 American made-for-television drama film dramatizing the true story of a child named David Rothenberg who was burned by his father. It co-starred Matthew Lawrence as David, Bernadette Peters as his mother, and John Glover as his father. It aired on ABC.

== Plot ==
The film is based on a book written by Marie Rothenberg and Mel White and relates the true story of David, a child who was burned over 90 percent of his body by his father. The parents were estranged and the non-custodial father, Charles Rothenberg, fled with David in tow to California, but quickly decided that he could not care for David alone. However, rather than return David to his mother's care, the elder Rothenberg used kerosene to set fire to his son while the boy slept in a hotel room. The movie shows how his mother, Marie Rothenberg, coped with the crisis, and the courage and determination of David.

== Cast ==
- Bernadette Peters as Marie Rothenberg
- John Glover as Charles Rothenberg
- Matthew Lawrence as David Rothenberg
- Dan Lauria as John Cirillo
- George Grizzard as Dr. Achauer
- Richard Ely as Surgeon

Source: AllMovie

== Responses ==
In his review, John J. O'Connor wrote: "David can indeed be painful at certain moments but, in the end, its message about going beyond surface appearances comes through admirably."

== Awards and nominations ==
- Emmy Awards

Outstanding Achievement in Makeup for a Miniseries or a Special (nominated)
Outstanding Drama/Comedy Special (nominated)
Outstanding Sound Editing for a Miniseries or a Special (nominated)

- Young Artist Award

Best Family TV Special (nominated)
Best Young Actor in a Special, Pilot, Movie of the Week or Mini-Series-Matthew Lawrence (nominated)
