= The Sunshine Boys (1996 film) =

1995 television film directed by John Erman

- DVD cover
- Based on: The Sunshine Boys; 1972 play by Neil Simon
- Screenplay by: Neil Simon
- Directed by: John Erman
- Starring: Woody Allen; Peter Falk; Sarah Jessica Parker
- Composer: Irwin Fisch
- Country of origin: United States
- Original language: English

Production
- Producer: John Erman
- Cinematography: Tony Imi
- Editor: Jack Wheeler
- Running time: 90 minutes
- Production companies: Metropolitan Productions; RHI Entertainment

Original release
- Network: CBS
- Release: December 28, 1997

The Sunshine Boys is a 1996 American comedy television film directed by John Erman and based on the 1972 play of the same title by Neil Simon about two legendary (and cranky) comics brought together for a reunion and revival of their famous act. The film stars Woody Allen and Peter Falk as the comedy duo alongside Sarah Jessica Parker. It premiered on December 28, 1997, on Hallmark Hall of Fame on CBS.

== Plot ==
Al Lewis and Willy Clark are two old comedians who were once a popular comedy act known as "Lewis and Clark" and also called the Sunshine Boys. After 43 years together, they parted ways 11 years ago on unfriendly terms and have not spoken to each other since then. A reunion is planned for a major network special on the history of comedy.

== Cast ==
- Peter Falk as Willy Clark
- Woody Allen as Al Lewis
- Sarah Jessica Parker as Nancy Davison
- Liev Schreiber as Ricky Gregg
- Michael McKean as Scott Grogan
- Whoopi Goldberg as Nurse
- Edie Falco as Carol

== Production ==
In 1995, Simon adapted his play for a Hallmark Entertainment production. His teleplay updated the setting and made the two comedians the product of the early days of television, the medium in which the playwright got his start. Unlike the film adaptation, although they are portrayed as cantankerous, their animosity was not as severe as Matthau's and Burns' characters' bad relationship.

Woody Allen was originally asked to direct the 1975 film adaptation The Sunshine Boys, but he was more interested in playing the role of Lewis and declined the offer. Twenty years later he was cast as Lewis in this television adaptation.
