= John Erman =

American television director and producer (1935–2021)

- Born: August 3, 1935; Hyde Park, Chicago, Illinois, U.S.
- Died: June 25, 2021 (aged 85); New York City, New York, U.S.
- Other name: John M. Erman
- Education: Beverly Hills High School; University of California, Los Angeles
- Occupations: Television director; Television producer
- Years active: 1955–2006
- Spouse: Richard Blair

John Erman (August 3, 1935 – June 25, 2021) was an American television director, producer, and actor. He was nominated for ten Primetime Emmy Awards, winning once for the film Who Will Love My Children? (1983). He also won two Directors Guild of America Awards for the miniseries Roots (1977) and the film An Early Frost (1985).

== Career ==
Born in Hyde Park, Chicago, Erman spent the early years of his career, after a few small roles in films such as The Cosmic Man (1957), directing episodes of such primetime series as Peyton Place, The Fugitive, The Outer Limits (original series), Stoney Burke, Ben Casey, My Favorite Martian, That Girl, The Flying Nun, Marcus Welby, M.D., Star Trek (original series), and Judd, for the Defense.

Erman directed episodes of Roots and its sequel, Roots: The Next Generations, as well as Alex Haley's Queen. He helmed many television films, including Alexander: The Other Side of Dawn, Green Eyes, Child of Glass, The Scarlett O'Hara War, Who Will Love My Children?, A Streetcar Named Desire, The Two Mrs. Grenvilles, Right to Kill?, An Early Frost, The Atlanta Child Murders, The Attic: The Hiding of Anne Frank, David, Breathing Lessons, Scarlett, The Sunshine Boys, Too Rich: The Secret Life of Doris Duke, The Boys Next Door, and Candles on Bay Street, many of which he also produced.

Erman directed the feature films Making It (1971), Ace Eli and Rodger of the Skies (1973, credited as Bill Sampson) and Stella (1990).

== Death ==
Erman died on June 25, 2021, in New York City, New York after a brief illness, at age 85.

== Awards and nominations ==
=== Primetime Emmy Awards ===
| Year | Category | Nominated work | Result |
|---|---|---|---|
| 1977 | Outstanding Directing for a Drama Series | Roots ("Part II") | Nominated |
| 1980 | Outstanding Directing in a Limited Series or Special | The Scarlett O'Hara War | Nominated |
| 1983 | Outstanding Directing in a Limited Series or Special | Who Will Love My Children? | Won |
| 1984 | Outstanding Directing in a Limited Series or Special | A Streetcar Named Desire | Nominated |
| 1986 | Outstanding Directing in a Miniseries or Special | An Early Frost | Nominated |
| 1987 | Outstanding Miniseries | The Two Mrs. Grenvilles | Nominated |
| 1988 | Outstanding Drama/Comedy Special | The Attic: The Hiding of Anne Frank | Nominated |
| 1988 | Outstanding Directing in a Miniseries or Special | The Attic: The Hiding of Anne Frank | Nominated |
| 1989 | Outstanding Drama/Comedy Special | David | Nominated |
| 1994 | Outstanding Made for Television Movie | Breathing Lessons | Nominated |

=== Directors Guild of America Awards ===
| Year | Category | Nominated work | Result |
|---|---|---|---|
| 1978 | Outstanding Directing – Drama Series | Roots ("Part II") | Won |
| 1984 | Outstanding Directing – Miniseries or TV Film | Who Will Love My Children? | Nominated |
| 1986 | Outstanding Directing – Miniseries or TV Film | An Early Frost | Won |

== Filmography ==
=== Film ===
Director

- Making It (1971)
- Ace Eli and Rodger of the Skies (1973) (Credited as "Bill Sampson")
- Stella (1990)

Actor

| Year | Title | Role | Notes |
|---|---|---|---|
| 1955 | Blackboard Jungle | Daly | Uncredited |
| 1956 | The Benny Goodman Story | Harry Goodman (aged 16) | |
| 1956 | Anything Goes | Boy | Uncredited |
| 1959 | The Cosmic Man | Radar Operator | |

=== Television ===
| Year | Title | Director | Producer | Notes |
|---|---|---|---|---|
| 1962-63 | Stoney Burke | Yes | Associate | 11 Episodes; Also assistant to producer |
| 1963-64 | The Outer Limits | Yes | No | 19 episodes (first season only); Also production associate, casting consultant |
| 1964 | The Fugitive | Yes | No | 1 Episode |
| 1964 | Ben Casey | Yes | No | 1 Episode |
| 1965 | Karen | Yes | No | 1 Episode |
| 1965-66 | My Favorite Martian | Yes | No | 12 Episodes |
| 1966 | Please Don’t Eat The Daisies | Yes | No | 6 Episodes |
| 1966-67 | That Girl | Yes | No | 10 Episodes |
| 1967 | Occasional Wife | Yes | No | 1 Episode |
| 1967-68 | The Second Hundred Years | Yes | No | 4 Episodes |
| 1967-69 | Judd, for the Defense | Yes | No | 3 Episodes |
| 1967-69 | Peyton Place | Yes | No | 12 Episodes |
| 1968 | Star Trek | Yes | No | 1 Episode |
| 1968 | The Flying Nun | Yes | No | 4 Episodes |
| 1968-70 | The Ghost & Mrs. Muir | Yes | No | 8 Episodes |
| 1969 | Bracken's World | Yes | No | 1 Episode |
| 1969 | Gomer Pyle, U.S.M.C. | Yes | No | 2 Episodes |
| 1969-74 | Marcus Welby, M.D. | Yes | No | 5 Episodes |
| 1970 | Room 222 | Yes | No | 2 Episodes |
| 1971 | Arnie | Yes | No | 1 Episode |
| 1974 | The Girl with Something Extra | Yes | No | 1 Episode |
| 1975 | The Bob Newhart Show | Yes | No | 1 Episode |
| 1975 | Karen | Yes | No | 3 Episodes |
| 1975 | M*A*S*H | Yes | No | 1 Episode |
| 1976 | Family | Yes | No | 4 Episodes |
| 1976 | Good Heavens | Yes | No | 1 Episode |
| 1977 | Roots | Yes | No | 1 Episode |
| 1979 | Roots: The Next Generations | Yes | No | 3 Episodes |
| 1985 | The Atlanta Child Murders | Yes | No | |
| 1987 | The Two Mrs. Grenvilles | Yes | Supervising | |
| 1993 | Alex Haley's Queen | Yes | Co-Producer | |
| 1994 | Scarlett | Yes | Yes | |
| 1999 | Too Rich: The Secret Life of Doris Duke | Yes | No | |
| 2001 | Victoria & Albert | Yes | No | 2 Episodes |

Actor

- Navy Log (1957)
- West Point (1957)
- Playhouse 90 (1958)
- Profiles in Courage (1965)

TV movies

| Year | Title | Director | Producer |
|---|---|---|---|
| 1973 | Letters from Three Lovers | Yes | No |
| 1977 | Green Eyes | Yes | Yes |
| 1977 | Alexander: The Other Side of Dawn | Yes | No |
| 1978 | Child of Glass | Yes | No |
| 1978 | Just Me and You | Yes | No |
| 1979 | My Old Man | Yes | No |
| 1980 | The Scarlett O'Hara War | Yes | No |
| 1980 | This Year's Blonde | Yes | No |
| 1980 | The Silent Lovers | Yes | No |
| 1982 | The Letter | Yes | No |
| 1982 | Eleanor, First Lady of the World | Yes | No |
| 1983 | Another Woman's Child | Yes | No |
| 1983 | Who Will Love My Children? | Yes | No |
| 1984 | A Streetcar Named Desire | Yes | No |
| 1985 | Right to Kill? | Yes | No |
| 1985 | An Early Frost | Yes | No |
| 1987 | When the Time Comes | Yes | Yes |
| 1988 | The Attic: The Hiding of Anne Frank | Yes | Supervisor |
| 1988 | David | Yes | No |
| 1990 | The Last Best Year | Yes | Yes |
| 1991 | The Last to Go | Yes | Yes |
| 1991 | Our Sons | Yes | No |
| 1991 | Carolina Skeletons | Yes | Supervisor |
| 1994 | Breathing Lessons | Yes | Yes |
| 1996 | The Boys Next Door | Yes | Yes |
| 1996 | The Sunshine Boys | Yes | No |
| 1997 | Ellen Foster | Yes | Yes |
| 1998 | Only Love | Yes | Executive |
| 2004 | The Blackwater Lightship | Yes | Yes |
| 2006 | Candles on Bay Street | Yes | Yes |
