= The Sunshine Boys (1975 film) =

1975 film

- Theatrical release poster by Al Hirschfeld
- Directed by: Herbert Ross
- Screenplay by: Neil Simon
- Based on: The Sunshine Boys; 1972 play by Neil Simon
- Produced by: Ray Stark
- Starring: Walter Matthau; George Burns; Richard Benjamin
- Cinematography: David M. Walsh
- Edited by: John F. Burnett
- Music by: Irwin Fisch
- Production companies: Rastar; Metro-Goldwyn-Mayer
- Distributed by: United Artists (United States and Canada); Cinema International Corporation (international)
- Release date: November 6, 1975
- Running time: 111 minutes
- Country: United States
- Language: English

The Sunshine Boys is an American comedy film directed by Herbert Ross, produced by Ray Stark, and released by Metro-Goldwyn-Mayer in 1975. The film is adapted from the 1972 play by Neil Simon about two legendary (and cranky) vaudeville comedians reunited for a television special and revival of their famous act. The cast includes Walter Matthau as Willy Clark, real-life experienced vaudevillian actor George Burns as Al Lewis, and Richard Benjamin as Ben Clark, Willy's nephew and agent. The supporting cast includes Lee Meredith, F. Murray Abraham, Carol Arthur, Jennifer Lee, Rosetta LeNoire, Howard Hesseman, Ron Rifkin and Fritz Feld.

== Plot ==
Al Lewis and Willy Clark are two elderly comedians who were once a popular vaudeville comedy act known as "Lewis and Clark" and also called the Sunshine Boys. After 47 years together, they acrimoniously parted ways 11 years earlier and have not spoken since. The break-up was partly due to Al's intent to retire and Willy's desire to continue performing. Willy's nephew Ben, a talent agent, tries to find work for Willy, which proves difficult because of Willy's senility and blustery temperament.

When ABC decides to produce a television special on the history of comedy and wants the Sunshine Boys to reunite for the program, Ben tries to secure the duo's cooperation one last time. He attempts to manage the individual quirks of two old men in their twilight years, including omitting the abuse and insults that both used when discussing the other with him, and diplomatically portraying both as eager to do the "Doctor Sketch" for the TV special to give the appearance of harmony.

An attempt to rehearse the "Doctor Sketch" at Willy's apartment starts with the two grudgingly getting reacquainted, but goes only as far as Al entering the doctor's (Willy's) office before Willy decides to change the scripted, long-established "Come in" to "Enter!" This results in a loud shouting argument and Al's early departure.

Ben attempts to patch up and salvage the situation despite Al's daughter objecting to her father being bothered any further about the special, and he manages to get them into the TV studio. In the dressing room, they do not speak to each other, as they did in the final year of doing their act together. Unpleasantness arises when Willy carelessly dumps makeup jars on Al in the dressing room, followed by Willy's usual problem with opening doors.

After Phyllis Diller finishes her scene and Steve Allen speaks his introduction, the "Doctor Sketch" begins. It flows smoothly until Willy becomes irately inconsolable about Al's "spitting" during the enunciation of Ts, as well as poking him in the chest. Despite Ben and the studio staff trying to restore order, Willy storms off the set, shouting accusations and decades of old bitterness. Al also leaves, finding it impossible to work with Willy. In the stairwell, Willy falls, his ongoing temper tantrum causing a heart attack.

Willy recovers, first in the hospital, then at home with a private nurse, with whom he bickers and chides. Ben visits, insisting that Willy retire, offering his own home or a NJ actors' retirement home for his convalescence. Serendipitously, Al is moving into the same NJ actor's home because his daughter is having a third baby and will need his room. The two men reconcile in Willy's apartment, chatting about mutual theater acquaintances in Variety magazine.

== Cast ==
- Walter Matthau as Willy Clark
- George Burns as Al Lewis
- Richard Benjamin as Ben Clark
- Lee Meredith as Nurse in Doctor Sketch (Miss McIntosh)
- Carol Arthur as Doris Green
- Rosetta Le Noire as Odessa (Willie's hospital nurse)
- F. Murray Abraham as Mechanic
- Howard Hesseman as Mr. Walsh
- James Cranna as Mr. Schaeffer
- Ron Rifkin as TV floor manager
- Jennifer Lee as Helen Clark
- Fritz Feld as Mr. Gilbert (German man at audition)
- Jack Bernardi as man at Audition
- Tom Spratley as Card Player
- Garn Stephens as Eddie the Stage Manager
- Santos Morales as Desk Clerk (the "Spanish kid")
- Archie Hahn as Assistant at Audition
- Steve Allen (uncredited) as himself
- Phyllis Diller (uncredited) as herself

== Production ==
=== Development ===
Woody Allen originally was asked to direct, but he was more interested in playing the role of Lewis and declined the offer. Twenty years later, he was cast as Lewis in the 1996 television adaptation.

=== Casting ===
Initially, Bob Hope and Bing Crosby were proposed for the leads, but Simon was opposed to the idea. He felt the roles required Jewish comedians. Several actors were considered, including James Cagney, and Phil Silvers filmed a screen test. Eventually, the roles were given to real-life vaudevillian veterans Red Skelton and Jack Benny.

Skelton backed out after realizing that his income as a stand-up comic was higher than what he was offered for the film; he was replaced by the younger Matthau. Benny was forced to withdraw after being diagnosed with the pancreatic cancer that would claim his life in December 1974. For the role, Benny recommended his friend and fellow real-life veteran vaudevillian George Burns, who had not appeared in a feature film since 1939. Burns' Academy Award-winning performance in the film revived his career at age 79 and redefined his popular image as an active, older comedy star.

Six weeks before filming started, Burns had triple bypass heart surgery.

== Reception ==
=== Box office ===
The Sunshine Boys was a moderate financial success for Metro-Goldwyn-Mayer but fell short of box-office projections. MGM president Frank Rosenfelt said, "I liked it. I thought it was funny. I thought the playing was great. But it didn't work with the public."

The film had its world premiere at Radio City Music Hall in New York City on November 6, 1975. It grossed $4.7 million at the Hall and had grossed $10.2 million in the United States and Canada after 17 weeks.

=== Critical ===
On the review aggregator website Rotten Tomatoes, 69% of 39 critics' reviews are positive, with an average rating of 7/10. The website's consensus reads: "Thanks to the sparkling chemistry between its stars and Herbert Ross' gentle direction, this sweetly ambling comedy ranks among Neil Simon's finest screen adaptations."

Vincent Canby of The New York Times wrote that with Matthau "at the top of his most antisocial form" and Burns "giving a keenly funny, brilliant straight performance and with Mr. Simon delivering some of his best one-liners, the movie is extremely easy to take. It's only afterward you realize that two complex characters, as well as a unique personal and professional relationship, have been used up—wasted—in the interests of comedy no more substantial than the insults that Willy and Al throw at each other."

Arthur D. Murphy of Variety called it "an extremely sensitive and lovable film version of Neil Simon's play, with Walter Matthau and George Burns outstanding in their starring roles as a pair of long-hostile vaudeville partners".

Gene Siskel of the Chicago Tribune gave the film two stars out of four, and wrote that it "simply provides more of the insult comedy sweeping television. It's a prune-faced 'Odd Couple' without that play's affection for its characters and its characters' affection for each other."

Kevin Thomas of the Los Angeles Times called it "one of the year's funniest yet most poignant pictures", adding that "Simon not only wrings much laughter from Lewis and Clark's predicament but also brings us very close to tears".

Gary Arnold of The Washington Post called the film "more amusing than one might have expected, probably because Walter Matthau makes a surprisingly funny and plausible old coot".

Pauline Kael of The New Yorker wrote, "I'm a very easy laugher, and I didn't laugh once at The Sunshine Boys. The only part of the movie I enjoyed was the footage during the titles—clips of vaudeville headliners from early short subjects and Hollywood Revue of 1929."

=== Awards and nominations ===
Award	Category	Nominee(s)	Result	Ref.
Academy Awards	Best Actor	Walter Matthau	Nominated	
Academy Awards	Best Supporting Actor	George Burns	Won	
Academy Awards	Best Screenplay – Adapted from Other Material	Neil Simon	Nominated	
Academy Awards	Best Art Direction	Albert Brenner and Marvin March	Nominated	
British Academy Film Awards	Best Actor in a Leading Role	Walter Matthau (also for The Bad News Bears)	Nominated	
British Academy Film Awards	Best Screenplay	Neil Simon	Nominated	
Golden Globe Awards	Best Motion Picture – Musical or Comedy		Won	
Golden Globe Awards	Best Actor in a Motion Picture – Musical or Comedy	George Burns	Won (Note: Both actors tied.)	
Golden Globe Awards	Best Actor in a Motion Picture – Musical or Comedy	Walter Matthau	Won	
Golden Globe Awards	Best Supporting Actor – Motion Picture	Richard Benjamin	Won	
Golden Globe Awards	Best Screenplay – Motion Picture	Neil Simon	Nominated	
Writers Guild of America Awards	Best Comedy Adapted from Another Medium	Neil Simon	Won	
