= Camille 2000 =

1969 film by Radley Metzger

- Theatrical release poster
- Directed by: Radley Metzger
- Screenplay by: Michael de Forrest
- Based on: La Dame aux Camélias; 1852 novel by Alexandre Dumas fils
- Produced by: Radley Metzger
- Starring: Danielle Gaubert; Nino Castelnuovo; Eleonora Rossi-Drago; Silvana Venturelli; Roberto Bisacco; Philippe Forquet; Massimo Serato; Zachary Adams; Peter Chatel; Graziella Galvani
- Cinematography: Ennio Guarnieri
- Edited by: Humphrey Wood; Amedeo Salfa
- Music by: Piero Piccioni
- Production company: Spear Productions
- Distributed by: Cinerad
- Release date: 1969
- Running time: 130 minutes
- Country: Italy
- Language: English
- Budget: $500,000 (est.)

Camille 2000 is a 1969 Italian erotic drama film directed by Radley Metzger from a screenplay by Michael DeForrest, based on the 1848 novel and 1852 play La Dame aux Camélias by Alexandre Dumas, fils. It stars Danièle Gaubert and Nino Castelnuovo with Eleonora Rossi Drago and Massimo Serato.

The story follows Marguerite, a beautiful woman of affairs (a double entendre on man of affairs) who falls for the young and promising Armand, but sacrifices her love for him for the sake of his future and reputation.

== Plot ==
Camille 2000 is set in Rome, in the late sixties. Marguerite Gautier lives a carefree life filled with parties, encounters, drugs, and casual relationships, all in the luxurious villa of her benefactor, Count De Mauriac. To the elderly count, Marguerite—known as Camille due to her love for camellias—is more than a lover; she's like a daughter, having met her after his real daughter died from an overdose.

Armand Duval arrives in Rome, a young French entrepreneur sent by his father for business. At one of the many social events, he quickly meets Marguerite. While he falls for her instantly, she sees him as just another temporary relationship, amidst her other affairs, which sparks his jealousy. However, Marguerite gradually begins to develop feelings for Armand and decides to spend the summer exclusively with him, secretly leaving for Porto Ercole on De Mauriac's luxurious yacht. During their vacation, Armand's father approaches Marguerite, suspecting her relationship with his son is driven by financial motives, and convinces her to leave him.

Marguerite reluctantly returns to her world of promiscuity and becomes increasingly trapped in drug addiction. She distances herself from Armand, who remains unaware of the conversation between her and his father. Marguerite humiliates him by being caught with another lover. They meet again at a party, where Armand realizes the extent of her addiction. When he learns of her hospitalization in a clinic, he rushes to her side but arrives too late, only to hold her in his arms as she dies.

== Cast ==
- Danièle Gaubert as Marguerite Gautier
- Nino Castelnuovo as Armand Duval
- Eleonora Rossi Drago as Prudence (credited as Eleonora Rossi-Drago)
- Roberto Bisacco as Gastion
- Massimo Serato as Armand's father
- Silvana Venturelli as Olympe
- Peter Chatel as Marguerite's Friend

== Release ==
Camille 2000 opened in New York on 16 July 1969.

== Reception ==
On the review aggregator website Rotten Tomatoes, the film holds an approval rating of 14% based on seven reviews, with an average rating of 5.2/10. Roger Ebert was not impressed and gave the film a one-star review. Yet, some critics found strengths in Camille 2000. Film critic Gary Morris noted that the film is "a breathless series of ultra-plush environments that resonate with Italian haute design of the period" Critic Marcus Doidge referred to Camille 2000 as a "cult" favorite and noted the film "offered up way more drama than I expected from it. The story perfectly balances sex with drama and genuinely gives us a couple that are getting drawn closer and closer together, even when we know they would probably be better off apart at times".

== Notes ==
According to Steve Gallagher of Filmmaker, Radley Metzger's films, including those made during the Golden Age of Porn (1969–1984), are noted for their "lavish design, witty screenplays, and a penchant for the unusual camera angle". Clare Simpson of WhatCulture noted that his films were "highly artistic—and often cerebral ... and often featured gorgeous cinematography". Film and audio works by Metzger have been added to the permanent collection of the Museum of Modern Art (MoMA) in New York City.
