= Alex Henteloff =

American actor (born 1942)

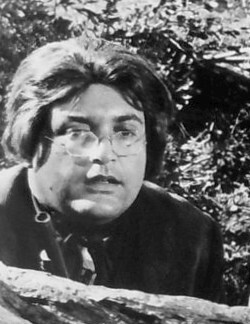
- Henteloff in a scene from The Young Rebels (1970)
- Born: May 23, 1942 (age 84); Los Angeles, California, U.S.
- Occupation: Actor
- Years active: 1966–1999

Alex Henteloff (born May 23, 1942) is an American actor.

== Early life and career ==
Henteloff was born in Los Angeles, he has appeared mostly on television in guest-starring roles. He played aggressive attorney Arnold Drake Ripner in six episodes of the television series Barney Miller, and he guest-starred in a seventh episode in the character role of an expert forger. Barney Miller writer Reinhold Weege hired Henteloff for Weege's subsequent series Night Court (four episodes).

Henteloff appeared as Doug Porterfield in 14 episodes of The Betty White Show (1977–78). He was a regular on the 1973 situation comedy Needles and Pins playing Myron Russo. He also appeared in some feature film roles including Slither (1973), Hardly Working (1980), Star Trek IV: The Voyage Home (1986), and Payback (1999).

== Filmography ==
| Year | Title | Role | Notes |
|---|---|---|---|
| 1973 | Slither | Man at Phone Booth | |
| 1977 | Code Name: Diamond Head | Dr. Edward Sherman | |
| 1979 | The Last Word | Harry | |
| 1980 | Hardly Working | J. Eating | |
| 1983 | Hart to Hart | Richard Bauer | |
| 1986 | 52 Pick-Up | Dan Lowenthal | |
| 1986 | Star Trek IV: The Voyage Home | Nichols | PlexiCorp Factory Manager |
| 1999 | Payback | Restaurant Manager | |

=== Television ===
| Year | Title | Role | Notes |
|---|---|---|---|
| 1973 | M*A*S*H | Captain Adam Casey | episode "Dear Dad...again" |
| 1973 | Needles and Pins | Myron Russo | |
| 1975 | Cannon | Jordan Pierson | episode "Search and Destroy" |
| 1977 | The Betty White Show | Doug Porterfield | 14 episodes |

His many TV appearances include I Spy, Mannix, Streets of San Francisco (three episodes), Baretta, Family Ties, The Mary Tyler Moore Show, McCloud, Ironside, Pistols 'n' Petticoats, Charlie's Angels, Dynasty (two episodes), Murder, She Wrote, Soap, Quincy, M.E., ALF, Melrose Place, Simon & Simon (four episodes), Hill Street Blues, St. Elsewhere, Columbo and The Young Rebels (in which he co-starred in its 15-episode run, in 1970). Henteloff appeared in the first season of Barnaby Jones (five episodes).
