= The Young Rebels =

American TV series

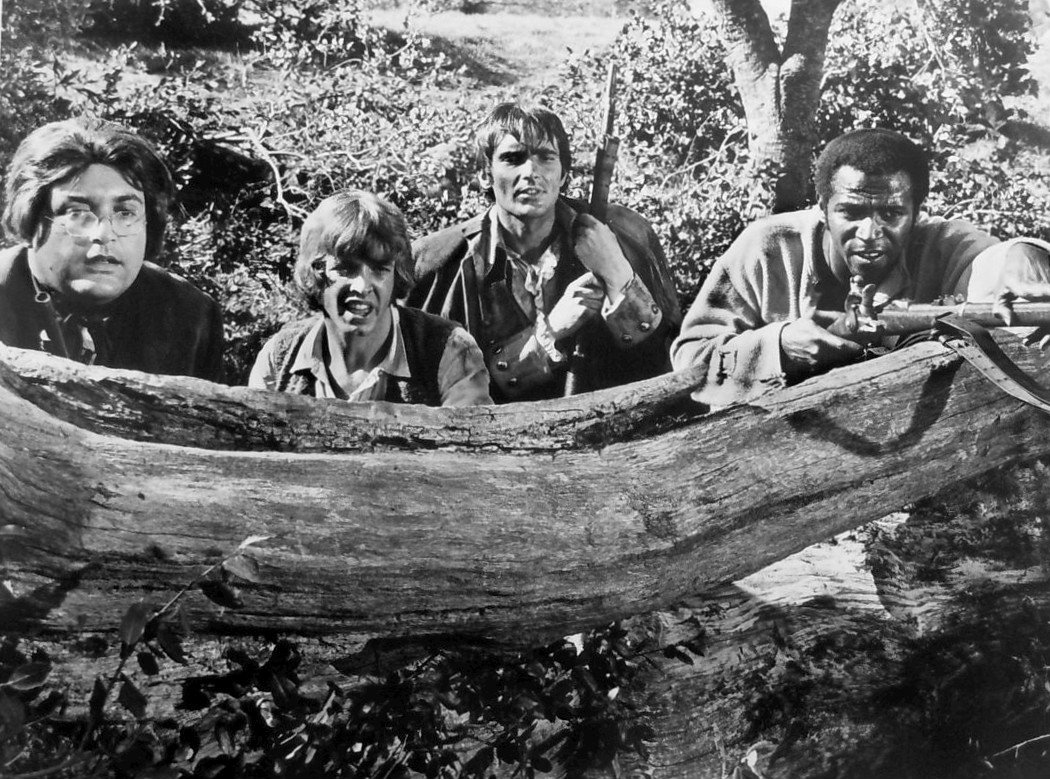
- From left-Alex Henteloff, Rick Ely, Philippe Forquet, and Lou Gossett, Jr.
- Created by: Peter Gayle
- Developed by: Harve Bennett
- Starring: Richard Ely; Louis Gossett Jr. Alex Henteloff; Hilary Thompson; Philippe Forquet
- Composer: Dominic Frontiere
- Country of origin: United States
- Original language: English
- No. of seasons: 1
- No. of episodes: 15

Production
- Executive producer: Aaron Spelling
- Running time: 60 minutes
- Production company: Screen Gems

Original release
- Network: ABC
- Release: September 20, 1970 – January 3, 1971

The Young Rebels is an American adventure television series that was broadcast by ABC as part of its 1970 fall lineup on Sunday night at 7:00 p.m Eastern time.

== Plot ==
The Young Rebels is the story of a group of youthful guerrillas fighting on the Patriot side in the American Revolutionary War (a.k.a. the American War of Independence). They were part of the fictional "Yankee Doodle Society", based in Chester, Pennsylvania, in 1777. Their goal is to harass the British forces however they can and serve as spies for the rebels. The four main characters are Jeremy (Richard Ely), son of the mayor of Chester; Isak (Louis Gossett Jr.), a former slave; Henry (Alex Henteloff), a bright young, bespectacled man who looks a lot (by design) like a younger Benjamin Franklin, whom he greatly admires; and Elizabeth (Hilary Thompson), Jeremy's even-younger girlfriend. Aiding these young American rebels in their cause is a young French rebel, the Marquis de Lafayette (Philippe Forquet), who had come to their aid not only because he believed in their cause but also to learn how to export many of its principles to his native France. Any parallel between this "youth movement" and the one going on in the United States in real life at the same time that this show was aired was completely intentional.

== Cast ==
- Richard Ely as Jeremy Larkin
- Hilary Thompson as Elizabeth Coates
- Louis Gossett Jr. as Isak Poole
- Alex Henteloff as Henry Abington
- Philippe Forquet as General the Marquis de Lafayette
- Clive Clerk as Jonno Devery

== Reception ==
The Young Rebels was up against the very popular family shows Lassie and The Wonderful World of Disney on competitors CBS and NBC respectively. Rick Ely and Philippe Forquet became teenage idols and were widely featured in movie and fan magazines. Despite extensive promotion and a large (by television standards of the era) production budget, The Young Rebels failed to garner enough of an audience and was canceled at midseason.

== Episodes ==
No.	Title	Directed by	Written by	Original release date
1	"Father & I Went Down to Camp"	George McCowan	Harve Bennett	September 20, 1970
Following the devastating loss at the Battle of Brandywine, three young patriots anonymously assist the American retreat by helping to prevent pursuit by the British, and also aid the wounded General Lafayette (Philippe Forquet), who has been separated from his troops. Guest stars: Ivor Barry, Will Geer, Ivor Francis and Sheb Wooley.
2	"The Ring of Freedom"	George McCowan	Peter Allan Fields	September 27, 1970
Irritated with the daily ringing of the Liberty Bell in Philadelphia as a show of defiance against the English occupation, the British decide to remove the bell and melt it down. Receiving word of this, the young rebels devise a plan to intercept the bell and take it into hiding. Guest stars: Will Geer, Larry Linville and Morgan Jones.
3	"The Blood of an Englishman"	Sutton Roley	Edward J. Lakso	October 4, 1970
A successful mission turns deadly when Isak (Louis Gossett Jr.) is wounded. On foot and far from help, Jeremy (Richard Ely) is forced to enter the British encampment and kidnap their physician, who is the brother of the regimental commander. Guest stars: Tom Troupe, Brad David and John Colicos.
4	"To Hang a Hero"	Harry Falk	Frank Telford	October 11, 1970
Jeremy, Henry and Isak are sent to New York to assist Patriot spy Nathan Hale (Brandon deWilde). When Hale is betrayed by his cousin and arrested, they try to devise a plan to save him. Guest stars: Donald Losby and Ivor Barry.
5	"Fort Hope"	E. W. Swackhamer	Guerdon Trueblood	October 18, 1970
Jeremy and Isak must enter a British prison camp in order to obtain sensitive information from a rebel spy. Unfortunately, the spy has died, leaving the information with a trusted friend. Jeremy and Isak must win the soldier's trust in order to retrieve the information to take back to General Washington. Guest stars: Lew Brown, William Wintersole and Morgan Jones.
6	"Suicide Squad"	E. W. Swackhamer	Story by : Jerome Ross; Teleplay by : Jerome Ross & John Wilder	October 25, 1970
Entrusted to deliver highly sensitive documents directly to Commanding General Washington, Jeremy and Elizabeth pose as a married couple delivering supplies to the troops at Valley Forge. To help guard the documents, they are accompanied by Henry and Isak. While in route, they learn that the British have deployed ten specially trained killers to assassinate Washington, and that one of them may be one of the travelers they picked up along the road, in which case they will be delivering him directly to his target. Guest stars: Steve Ihnat, Paul Carr, Frank Marth, Clive Clerk, and Myron Healey.
7	"Alias Ben Todd"	Michael Caffey	Don Brinkley	November 1, 1970
When a Tory from Chester sneaks into Lafayette's tent and steals military documents, Jeremy and Isak give chase. The Tory is injured during a fall from his horse, and is taken back to Lafayette's camp, where he later dies. Finding a letter of introduction to a nearby British commandant, Jeremy decides to pose as the spy, Ben Todd, in order to get inside British headquarters and obtain useful information for the rebels. Guest stars: Richard Gates and Lee Purcell.
8	"The Hostages"	Sutton Roley	Richard Carr and Jim Byrnes (teleplay), Richard Carr (story)	November 8, 1970
Major Zanker (Eric Braeden) takes ten hostages from the township, including Jeremy, Elizabeth and her uncle John Coates (Eric Christmas). Guest stars: Morgan Jones and Gordon Jump.
9	"Age of Independence"	Lou Antonio	John Wilder	November 15, 1970
John Marshall (David Soul) comes to Chester to recruit young men for the war effort, and encourages Jeremy, Henry and Isak to meet with him. Committed to their own secret operations, they decline his invitation to join his troops, citing neutrality. When a friend is killed by redcoats on his way home from the meeting, young Tad (Mitch Vogel) accuses Jeremy of betraying him to the British, and plots to assassinate him to avenge his brother. Guest stars: Nigel McKeand, Donald Moffat and Will Geer.
10	"Stalemate"	Arthur H. Nadel	Sy Salkowitz	November 22, 1970
When Jeremy, Henry and Isak intercept a requisition for arms, ammunition, and provisions, a plan is devised to seize wagons and cargo and redirect them to General Lafayette's troops. The plan goes well until an attempt to block pursuit goes awry, and the subsequent explosion traps the three rebels and Elizabeth inside an abandoned mine with four British soldiers. Guest stars: John Orchard, Harvey Jason and Terrence Scammell.
11	"Valley of the Guns"	Earl Bellamy	Jerry Ziegman	November 29, 1970
A Boston composer is harassed by the British soldiers because his songs are performed by American troops. Guest stars: Monte Markham and Barron Christian.
12	"Dangerous Ally"	Harry Falk	Frank Telford	December 6, 1970
Disgusted with the pace of the war and the lack of enthusiasm by some of the Chester residents, Henry's cousin Edward (Richard Kelton) turns to terrorist activities. When Henry (Alex Henteloff) is arrested in his place and sentenced to hang, Jeremy, Isak, and Lafayette organize a rescue. Guest stars: Farrah Fawcett, Joan Tompkins and John Mitchum.
13	"The Infiltrator"	Harry Falk	Frank Telford	December 20, 1970
After one of the rebel missions goes awry, it becomes obvious that one of their recruits has tipped off the enemy of their plans. Unfortunately, they don't have time to rout out the infiltrator before the next mission. Guest stars: Stephen Young, Bernard Fox, Todd Susman and Elizabeth Baur.
14	"Unbroken Chains"	Marc Daniels	Anthony Lawrence	December 27, 1970
Separated as children and sold to different slave-owners, Isak is reunited with his brother, Pompey (Paul Winfield). The reunion is not a happy one, however, for Pompey has been promised freedom by the British if he will serve their cause. After Pompey is captured by Lafayette's men and sentenced to be shot as a spy, Isak goes against his commanding officer and frees his brother. Guest stars: Sasha Harden and Barron Christian.
15	"To Kill a Traitor"	George McCowan	Peter Allan Fields	January 3, 1971
Jeremy is sent to Philadelphia on an emergency mission to intercept a spy and the document he's carrying before he can be betrayed by a double agent. Unknown to Jeremy, however, the spy he is assigned to protect is the double agent. Guest stars: Gary Lockwood

== See also ==
- List of television series and miniseries about the American Revolution
- List of films about the American Revolution
