= His Days Are Numbered =

1962 Italian film

- French release poster
- Directed by: Elio Petri
- Screenplay by: Tonino Guerra; Elio Petri; Carlo Romano
- Story by: Tonino Guerra; Elio Petri
- Produced by: Anna Maria Campanile
- Starring: Salvo Randone; Franco Sportelli; Regina Bianchi; Lando Buzzanca
- Cinematography: Ennio Guarnieri
- Edited by: Ruggero Mastroianni
- Music by: Ivan Vandor
- Production company: Titanus
- Distributed by: Titanus
- Release date: 25 March 1962 (Mar del Plata International Film Festival)
- Running time: 99 minutes; 94 minutes (DVD)
- Country: Italy
- Language: Italian

His Days Are Numbered (Italian: I giorni contati), also titled Numbered Days, is a 1962 Italian drama film directed by Elio Petri.

== Plot ==
While riding on a tram, Cesare, a 53-year-old plumber and widower, witnesses a passenger's sudden death from a heart attack. He realises his own mortality and decides to stop working, instead trying to make as much of his remaining time as possible. In a loosely connected series of scenes, he visits places he hasn't been to before like an airport or an art exhibition, goes to see his former girlfriend Giulia and other workers at their job, or watches residents of a housing area protesting intolerable sanitary conditions.

One by one, Cesare's attempts to pursuit his youth end in disappointment: Giulia walks out on him during a date, in his hometown the people he knew have mostly left or died, and the landlady's daughter carelessly wastes the money which he lent her for a new job and dates a wealthy man. Running out of money, he teams up with a gang of crooks to have his arm broken to collect insurance money, but backs out at the last minute. Eventually, he returns to his job. In the last scene, a tram driver tries to wake Cesare up who dozed off during the ride.

== Cast ==
- Salvo Randone as Cesare
- Franco Sportelli as Amilcare
- Regina Bianchi as Giulia
- Lando Buzzanca as Cesare's son
- Paolo Ferrari as Vinicio
- Vittorio Caprioli as art dealer
- Giulio Battiferri as Spartaco
- Marcella Valeri
- Angela Minervini
- Piero Gucaione
- Egidio Porzia
- Renato Maddalena
- Vittorio Bottone
- Alberto Amato
- Aldo Pini
- Silvio Silvi

== Production ==
His Days Are Numbered had been conceived by Petri before his debut film The Assassin (1961), but considered not commercial enough by the producers. The success of The Assassin both with the audience and critics eventually enabled the financing of His Days Are Numbered.

== Release ==
His Days Are Numbered premiered on 25 March 1962 at the Mar del Plata International Film Festival.

== Reception ==
While initially not a success, film historians and institutions have acknowledged the importance of His Days Are Numbered in later years, seeing influences of neorealism and the French nouvelle vague, Roberto Rossellini, Michelangelo Antonioni and early Jean-Luc Godard in particular, and drawing comparisons to Vittorio De Sica's Umberto D., Ingmar Bergman's Wild Strawberries and Akira Kurosawa's Ikiru.

== Awards ==
- 1962 Nastro d'Argento for Best Original Story
- 1962 Mar del Plata International Film Festival Astor de Oro for Best Film

== Legacy ==
His Days Are Numbered was shown in a restored version, carried out by the Museo Nazionale del Cinema in collaboration with the Cineteca di Bologna Foundation, at the Museo Nazionale del Cinema in 2012.
