= Blood Delirium =

- Directed by: Sergio Bergonzelli
- Screenplay by: Sergio Bergonzelli
- Story by: Sergio Bergonzelli
- Produced by: Scino Glam
- Starring: John Phillip Law; Gordon Mitchell; Brigitte Christensen
- Cinematography: Raffaele Mertes
- Edited by: Vincenzo Di Santo
- Music by: Nello Ciangherotti
- Production company: Cine Decima
- Running time: 90 minutes
- Country: Italy

Blood Delirium (Italian: Blood Delirium (Delirio di sangue)) is a direct-to-video Italian horror film directed by Sergio Bergonzelli. The film involves the painter Saint Simon (John Phillip Law) who loses his sanity after the death of his wife. Along with his butler Hermann (Gordon Mitchell), they meet a young pianist named Sybille (Brigitte Christiensen) who resembles his dead wife home to their castle. After Saint Simon discovers that blood from a murder victim re-inspires him artistically, he orders Hermann to seek out more women for him while Sybille is held captive in the castle.

== Plot ==
After the death of his wife Christine, the painter Saint Simon begins to lose his inspiration and his sanity. With the help of his butler Hermann, Saint Simon exhumed the corpse of his dead wife. Later, at an exhibition of his work, Saint Simon meets a young pianist named Sybille, who closely resembles Christine. He invites the woman to his castle, hoping it will cause his inspiration to reappear. The woman's presence initially fails to inspire his art, but after Saint Simon discovers that Hermann has attempted to rape a young woman and has killed her. Saint Simon discovers that the blood is the right color he requires for his paintings.

Saint Simon sends Hermann to go after Sybille's friend Corinne who is murdered with her blood drained for Saint Simon's art. Sybille is imprisoned in the castle, left to be the next victim to Hermann and Saint Simon until her fiancé Gerard arrives to save her.

== Production ==
Blood Delirium was director Sergio Bergonzelli's first attempt at a gothic horror film in his three-decade career which spanned working in Italy, France, Turkey, Spain and Greece. The director was predominantly making pornography for most of the decade and had only returned to feature film work with this erotic thriller Tentazione. Bergonzelli is credited as Peter Storage in the film's credits. In an interview in 1996, Bergonzelli stated he wrote the film with Fabio De Agostini although De Agostini is not credited in the credits. De Agostini had previously worked with Bergonzelli on previous scripts including Silvia e amore and In the Folds of the Flesh

Among the cast was John Phillip Law who took on the role to work again with his friend Gordon Mitchell. Law spoke negatively about the film later, "That one, yes, is extremely bad. When my Italian agent found out I had starred in it, he practically exploded. "John, you can't make movies like that! Don't you take yourself seriously?" The rest of the cast included Olinka Hardiman who also appeared in Tentazione in one of her rare non-hardcore pornography roles. The film was shot in the 13th century castle of Pereto in the Abruzzo region.

== Release ==
Although Blood Delirium was submitted to the Italian ratings board where it passed with a V.M.14 rating on 8 August 1988, the film was released direct-to-video in Italy by the distributor Azzurra. The home video version removed most of the film's gorier scenes.

== Reception ==
Robert Firsching of AllMovie opined that Blood Delirium was a "ridiculous horror film" that was "Absolute trash, this one is for completists and masochists only."
