= Salvo Randone =

Italian actor (1906–1991)

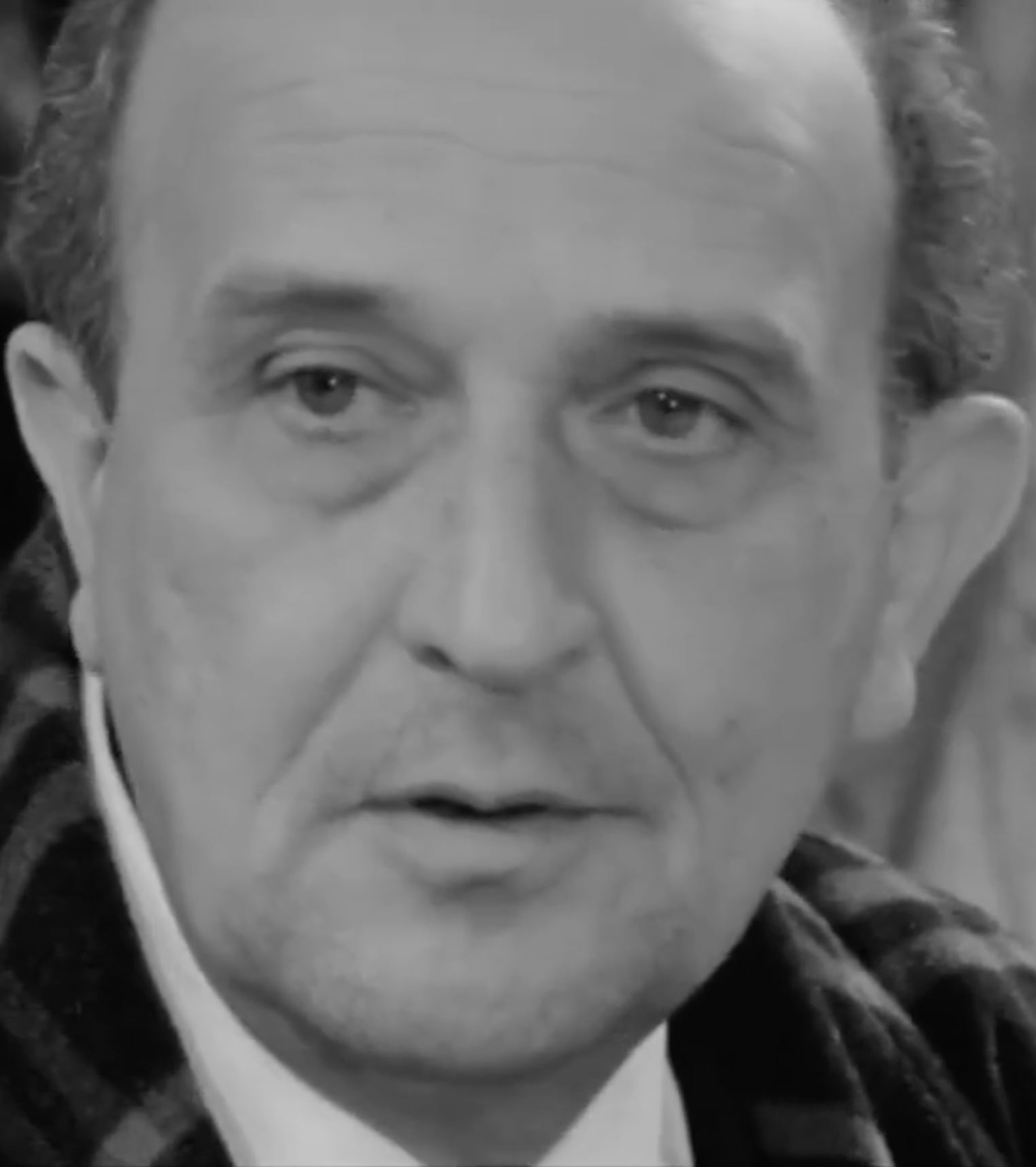
- Randone in The Girl from Parma (1963)
- Born: Salvatore Randone; 25 September 1906; Syracuse, Kingdom of Italy
- Died: 6 March 1991 (aged 84); Roma, Italy
- Occupation: Actor
- Spouse: Neda Naldi (1970–1991)

Salvatore Randone (25 September 1906 – 6 March 1991), known professionally as Salvo Randone, was an Italian stage, film and television actor.

== Biography ==
Born in Syracuse, Sicily, to state official Pasquale Randone and his wife Maria, Randone debuted on stage in his early 20s. During the 1930s and World War II, he acted in productions by Gualtiero Tumiati, Sergio Tofano, Anton Giulio Bragaglia and others. After the war, he appeared in stage productions by Luchino Visconti, Giorgio Strehler, Guido Salvini and Luigi Squarzina, becoming one of Italy's most noted stage thespians.

His most productive period was in the 1950s and 1960s, appearing on stage, in films, on television and on the radio. He worked with film directors such as Federico Fellini, Francesco Rosi, Valerio Zurlini, Luigi Zampa and Carlo Lizzani, but is most noted for his collaborations with Elio Petri, appearing in almost all of the director's films between The Assassin (1961) and Property Is No Longer a Theft (1973). His performances in Petri's films earned him two Nastro d'Argentos and a Grolla d'oro, the latter for his part in His Days Are Numbered (1962), which remained Randone's only leading role in a film.

Randone gave his last film performance in 1977 and retired from stage in 1989. Due to the financial hardship he found himself in during his final years, he was granted a lifetime allowance on the basis of the Bacchelli law which supported well-known citizens in need who had contributed to the fields of science, literature, arts, economics, work and sport.

Randone was married to actress Neda Naldi.

== Selected filmography ==
- Sant'Elena, piccola isola (1943) – General Gourgaud
- Heart and Soul (1948)
- Letter at Dawn (1948) – Donati
- The Bigamist (1956)
- Vento del sud (1959)
- The Assassin (1961) – Commissioner Palumbo
- Rome 1585 (1961) – Pope Sixtus V
- Black City (1962) – The bishop
- Salvatore Giuliano (1962) – President of Viterbo Assize Court
- His Days Are Numbered (1962) – Cesare Conversi
- Roaring Years (1962) – The antifascist
- Night Train to Milan (1962) – Conductor
- Family Diary (1962) – Salocchi
- The Girl from Parma (1963) – Scipio Pagliughi
- The Verona Trial (1963) – Andrea Fortunato
- Hands over the City (1963) – De Angelis
- Un marito in condominio (1963) – Salvatore Carcaterra
- Castle of Blood (1964) – Lester
- The Magnificent Cuckold (1964) – Belisario
- The Possessed (1965) – Enrico
- The 10th Victim (1965) – Professor
- Les Combinards (1966) – Raffaele Caccamo
- Me, Me, Me... and the Others (1966) – Traveller with a menu
- We Still Kill the Old Way (1967) – Prof. Roscio
- No Diamonds for Ursula (1967) – Spiros
- Spirits of the Dead (1968) – Priest (segment "Toby Dammit")
- Love Problems (1968)
- Machine Gun McCain (1969) – Don Salvatore
- Fellini Satyricon (1969) – Eumolpo
- Investigation of a Citizen Above Suspicion (1970) – Plumber
- The Swinging Confessors (1970) – Don Clemente
- Ninì Tirabusciò: la donna che inventò la mossa (1970)
- Gang War (1971) – Nicola "Nicky" Manzano
- The Working Class Goes to Heaven (1971) – Militina
- Stress (1971)
- My Dear Killer (1972) – Chief Marò
- Chronicle of a Homicide (1972) – General attorney
- Indian Summer (1972) – The head teacher
- Il caso Pisciotta (1972) – Don Ferdinando Cusimano
- La calandria (1972) – Calandro
- The Infamous Column (1972) – Settala
- Property Is No Longer a Theft (1973) – Total's father
- Shoot First, Die Later (1974) – Malacarne
- In the Name of the Pope King (1977) – Black pope
