= Elio Petri =

Italian filmmaker (1929–1982)

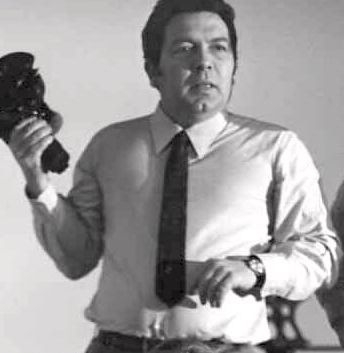
- Petri in 1968
- Born: Eraclio Petri; 29 January 1929; Rome, Kingdom of Italy
- Died: 10 November 1982 (aged 53); Rome, Italy
- Occupations: Film and stage director, screenwriter, film critic
- Years active: 1953–1982
- Spouse: Paola Pegoraro (1962–1982)

Eraclio Petri (29 January 1929 – 10 November 1982), commonly known as Elio Petri, was an Italian film and theatre director, screenwriter and film critic. The Museum of Modern Art described him as "one of the preeminent political and social satirists of 1960s and early 1970s Italian cinema". His film Investigation of a Citizen Above Suspicion won the 1971 Academy Award for Best Foreign-Language Film, and his subsequent film The Working Class Goes to Heaven received the Palme d'Or at the 1972 Cannes Film Festival.

Other noted films by Petri include The 10th Victim (1965), the prize-winning We Still Kill the Old Way (1967) and A Quiet Place in the Country (1968), and the controversially received Todo modo (1976).

== Biography ==
=== Early years ===
Petri was born in Rome on 29 January 1929. In 1944, he joined the youth organization of the Italian Communist Party (PCI). After graduating from Rome University as a literature major, he wrote articles on films for L'Unità, Gioventù nuova as well as for Città aperta. He later left the Communist Party after the Hungarian Revolution of 1956.

Gianni Puccini introduced Petri to neorealist director Giuseppe De Santis in the early 1950s. In the following years, Petri became a steady collaborator on De Santis' films, as a researcher for Rome 11:00 (1952), and as an assistant director and co-writer from A Husband for Anna (1953) until La garçonnière (1960). In addition, Petri wrote scripts for Giuliano Puccini, Aglauco Casadio and Carlo Lizzani during this period, and directed two documentary shorts, Nasce un campione (1954) and I sette contadini (1957).

=== Career as director ===
Petri made his feature film debut as a director with The Assassin (also titled The Lady Killer of Rome, 1961), starring Marcello Mastroianni as an egotistical social careerist accused of the murder of his former mistress. It was the first of four scenarios/screenplays written together with Tonino Guerra, and the first of Mastroianni's repeated appearances in Petri's films. The Assassin marked a deliberate departure from neorealism, examining his protagonist's psychology: "The protagonist of Bicycle Thieves today must face not only the society he lives in but also his own consciousness", Petri stated in an interview the following year. The film was a success both with the audience and the critics, enabling the financing of Petri's second film, His Days Are Numbered (1962), again co-written with Guerra. Other than The Assassin, His Days Are Numbered, the story of a plumber who becomes aware of his own mortality and stops going to work, was not a success.

Petri's next two directorial efforts, The Teacher from Vigevano (1963), a comedy drama about the troubles of a provincial school teacher, and Peccato nel pomeriggio, his contribution to the anthology film High Infidelity (1964), are regarded as lesser works by film historians. While preparing The 10th Victim, he participated in the sexy mondo film Nudi per vivere (1964), working under a pseudonym. The 10th Victim (1965), a satirical look at a future society finding distraction in a televised manhunt, met with reservations by some critics for being a commercial "compromise" by its director, but was successful with the audience.

We Still Kill the Old Way (1967), a crime drama following a murder investigation hindered by local power structures in rural Sicily, was adapted from the novel To Each His Own by Leonardo Sciascia and received the Best Screenplay Award at the 1967 Cannes Film Festival. The film marked the beginning of Petri's collaboration with screenwriter Ugo Pirro, which was to last until 1973, and was the first of four feature films by Petri to star Gian Maria Volontè. A Quiet Place in the Country (1968), a giallo thriller about an artist's deterioration into madness, won a Silver Bear award at the 19th Berlin International Film Festival, but was also dismissed by some critics as "kitsch" and "nonsense".

=== The "trilogy of neurosis" ===
With Investigation of a Citizen Above Suspicion (1970), which, among other accolades, received the Academy Award for Best Foreign-Language Film and two prizes at the 1970 Cannes Film Festival, Petri presented one of his most successful films. A political thriller and black comedy about a murderous police officer who deliberately leaves traces leading to him at the site of his crime, Investigation of a Citizen Above Suspicion is Petri's only film to be later included in the Italian Ministry of Cultural Heritage's list of 100 Italian films to be saved. In the same year, Petri participated in the political documentary films Documenti su Giuseppe Pinelli (also titled Dedicato a Pinelli), about the unresolved death of anarchist Giuseppe Pinelli, and 12 Dicembre.

The Working Class Goes to Heaven (1971), again honoured at the Cannes Film Festival, and Property Is No Longer a Theft (1973) continued the director's fractured and black comedic style. The former film follows a factory worker who sides with political radicals and slowly loses his mind when he is no longer needed; the latter focuses on a bank clerk who quits his job and turns to robbery. Film historians would later refer to Investigation of a Citizen Above Suspicion, The Working Class Goes to Heaven and Property Is No Longer a Theft as the "trilogy of neurosis": neurosis of power, neurosis of work and neurosis of money.

=== Later works ===
Todo modo (1976) was again adapted from a novel by Leonardo Sciascia. The film, a barely concealed satirical portrayal of Italy's then ruling Christian Democratic party and prime minister Aldo Moro, was received controversially upon its release and withdrawn from circulation after Moro's assassination two years later. Petri himself saw the film as a break with what he saw as "popular" political cinema, radical political films (both his and by other directors) produced within Italy's mainstream film industry.

In 1978, Petri directed Le mani sporche, a three-part television production of Jean-Paul Sartre's play Dirty Hands starring Marcello Mastroianni. His last film was Good News (1979), a portrayal of a society emotionally deformed by an omnipresent mass media, which he co-produced with his star Giancarlo Giannini. In 1981, Petri directed Arthur Miller's new play The American Clock at Genoa's Teatro Duse, with Lino Capolicchio playing the lead role.

=== Death ===
Petri died of cancer on 10 November 1982 in Rome, at the age of 53.

== Filmography ==
=== Director ===
All films were also written or co-written by Petri, except where noted

- 1954: Nasce un campione (short film)
- 1957: I sette contadini (short film, dir. only)
- 1961: The Assassin
- 1962: His Days Are Numbered
- 1963: The Teacher from Vigevano
- 1964: High Infidelity (segment "Peccato nel pomeriggio")
- 1964: Nudi per vivere (segment, dir. only)
- 1965: The 10th Victim
- 1967: We Still Kill the Old Way
- 1968: A Quiet Place in the Country
- 1970: Investigation of a Citizen Above Suspicion
- 1970: Documenti su Giuseppe Pinelli (segment "Ipotesi sulla morte di Giuseppe Pinelli", dir. only)
- 1970: 12 dicembre (segment, dir. only)
- 1971: The Working Class Goes to Heaven
- 1973: Property Is No Longer a Theft
- 1976: Todo modo
- 1978: Le mani sporche (TV miniseries)
- 1979: Good News

=== Screenplay only ===
- 1953: A Husband for Anna
- 1954: Angels of Darkness
- 1954: Days of Love
- 1955: Sunset in Naples
- 1956: The Wolves
- 1958: Piece of the Sky
- 1958: The Road a Year Long
- 1959: Train Without a Timetable
- 1959: The Employee
- 1959: Vento del sud
- 1959: Le notti dei teddy boys
- 1960: La garçonnière
- 1963: I mostri

== Awards (selected) ==
His Days Are Numbered

- 1962 Nastro d'Argento for Best Original Story
- 1962 Mar del Plata International Film Festival Astor de Oro for Best Film

We Still Kill the Old Way

- 1967 Cannes Film Festival Award for Best Screenplay
- 1968 Nastro d'Argento for Best Director and Best Screenplay

A Quiet Place in the Country

- 1969 Berlin International Film Festival Silver Bear

Investigation of a Citizen Above Suspicion

- 1970 Cannes Film Festival Special Prize of the Jury and FIPRESCI Prize
- 1970 David di Donatello for Best Film
- 1971 Academy Award for Best Foreign-Language Film
- 1971 Nastro d'Argento for Best Director
- 1971 Edgar Award for Best Motion Picture Screenplay

The Working Class Goes to Heaven

- 1972 Cannes Film Festival Palme d'Or
- 1972 David di Donatello for Best Film

== Publications ==
- Roma ore 11 (Rome & Milan: Sellerio Editore Palermo, 1956; 2004).
- L’assassino (Milan: Zibetti, 1962). With Tonino Guerra.
- Indagine su un cittadino al di sopra ogni sospetto (Rome: Tindalo, 1970). With Ugo Pirro.
- La proprietà non è più un furto (Milan: Bompiani, 1973). With Ugo Pirro.
- Scritti di cinema e di vita, ed. by Jean A. Gili (Rome: Bulzoni Editore, 2007).
- Writings On Cinema & Life (New York: Contra Mundum Press, 2013). Ed. by Jean A. Gili
