= Olinka Hardiman =

French model and actress (born 1960)

- Born: Olinka Richter; 16 January 1960 (age 66); Ostrava Czech Republic

Olinka Hardiman (born 16 January 1960) is a French model and actress. She is best known for her strong resemblance to actress Marilyn Monroe, whom Hardiman has occasionally portrayed in pornographic parodies. She is also known by other pseudonyms such as Marilyn Lamour, Marilyn Mitchell, and Olivia Link.

== Biography ==
Hardiman was one of the biggest stars of French pornographic films during the 1980s. Director Michel Lemoine featured her as the protagonist of over a dozen films, including Neiges brûlantes (1982), L'été les petites culottes s'envolent (1984), and Marilyn, mon amour (1985). In addition to her popularity in France, Hardiman has also starred in films shot in Germany, Sweden, Italy, and the United States of America.

Hardiman has appeared in some mainstream films such as I Love You (1986) by Marco Ferreri, and Delirio di sangue (1988) de Sergio Bergonzelli. She is also one of the actresses who portrayed Emmanuelle, the erotic heroine created by Emmanuelle Arsan, in Emmanuelle in Cannes (1980), an unofficial sequel directed by Jean-Marie Pallardy.

== Filmography ==
Year	Film	Role	Other notes
1979	Bloodline	Murder victim	scenes deleted
1980	Emmanuelle Goes to Cannes	Emmanuelle	
1981	Sechs Schwedinnen auf Ibiza	Lil	
1982	Neiges brûlantes	Muriel / Lorna	
1982	Heißer Sex auf Ibiza	Olinka, the Maid	
1982	Dans la chaleur de St-Tropez	Zaza	
1982	Alice: Rent a Girl	Alice	
1982	Mélodie pour Manuella	Manuella	
1982	L'inconnue	Le sosie de Marylin	
1982	Prison très spéciale pour femmes	Christine Weiss	
1982	Giovani, belle... probabilmente ricche	Caterina	
1983	Supergirls for Love		
1983	Furia porno		
1983	Call Girl		
1983	Hot Bodies		
1984	La femme en spirale	Pascale Miller	
1984	Ingrid, Whore of Hamburg	Ingrid	
1984	Die wilden Stunden der schönen Mädchen	Viola	
1984	Take My Body	Natacha, l'espionne	
1985	Marilyn, My Love	Amour	
1985	Spanish Fly		
1985	Inside Olinka (aka "Inside Marilyn")	Marilyn	
1985	Erotic Intruders		
1985	Bimbo		
1985	World Sex Festival	Marilyn	
1985	Olinka, Grand Priestess of Love		
1985	Kärleksdrömmar	Marilyn	
1985	Mobilehome Girls	Nadia	
1986	Miami Vice Girls	Gretta	
1986	Rosalie se découvre	Rosalie	
1986	Le retour de Marilyn		
1986	House of 1001 Pleasures	Claudine	
1986	I Love You	La maîtresse	
1986	Flying Skirts		
1987	Un desiderio bestiale		
1987	Tentazione	Ann	
1987	Tickle Time		
1988	La bottega del piacere		
1988	Delirio di sangue	Corinne	
1991	Postcards from Abroad		
