= La storia del fornaretto di Venezia =

1952 film

- Directed by: Giacinto Solito
- Release date: 1952
- Country: Italy
- Language: Italian

La storia del fornaretto di Venezia is a 1952 Italian historical drama film.

== Cast ==
- Doris Duranti as Bianca Sormani
- Mariella Lotti as Anna Loredan
- Paolo Carlini as Marco Loredan
- Renato Chiantoni as Il servo di Loredan
- Attilio Dottesio as L'avogadore
- Loris Gizzi as Don Fulgenzio
- Arnoldo Foà
- Vira Silenti
- Marco Vicario
- Isarco Ravaioli
- Sergio Bergonzelli
