= Eleonora Rossi Drago =

Italian actress (1925–2007)

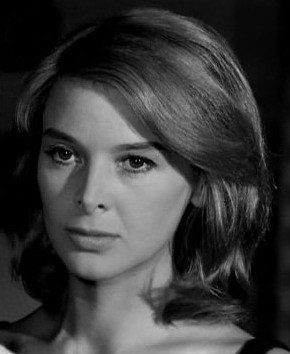
- Rossi Drago in Violent Summer (1959)
- Born: Palmina Omiccioli; 23 September 1925; Quinto al Mare, Genoa, Italy
- Died: 2 December 2007 (aged 82); Palermo, Sicily, Italy
- Years active: 1949–1970
- Spouses: Cesare Rossi (m. 1942; div. 1956); Domenico La Cavera (m. 1973)
- Children: 1

Eleonora Rossi Drago, born Palmina Omiccioli (23 September 1925 – 2 December 2007), was an Italian film actress. She was born in Quinto al Mare, Genoa, Italy, and had the leading role in Le amiche. She appeared in The Facts of Murder. In 1960, for her performance in Violent Summer, she won the best actress prize of the Mar del Plata Film Festival and the Nastro d'argento. In 1964, she appeared in La Cittadella. She died in Palermo, Italy.

== Selected filmography ==
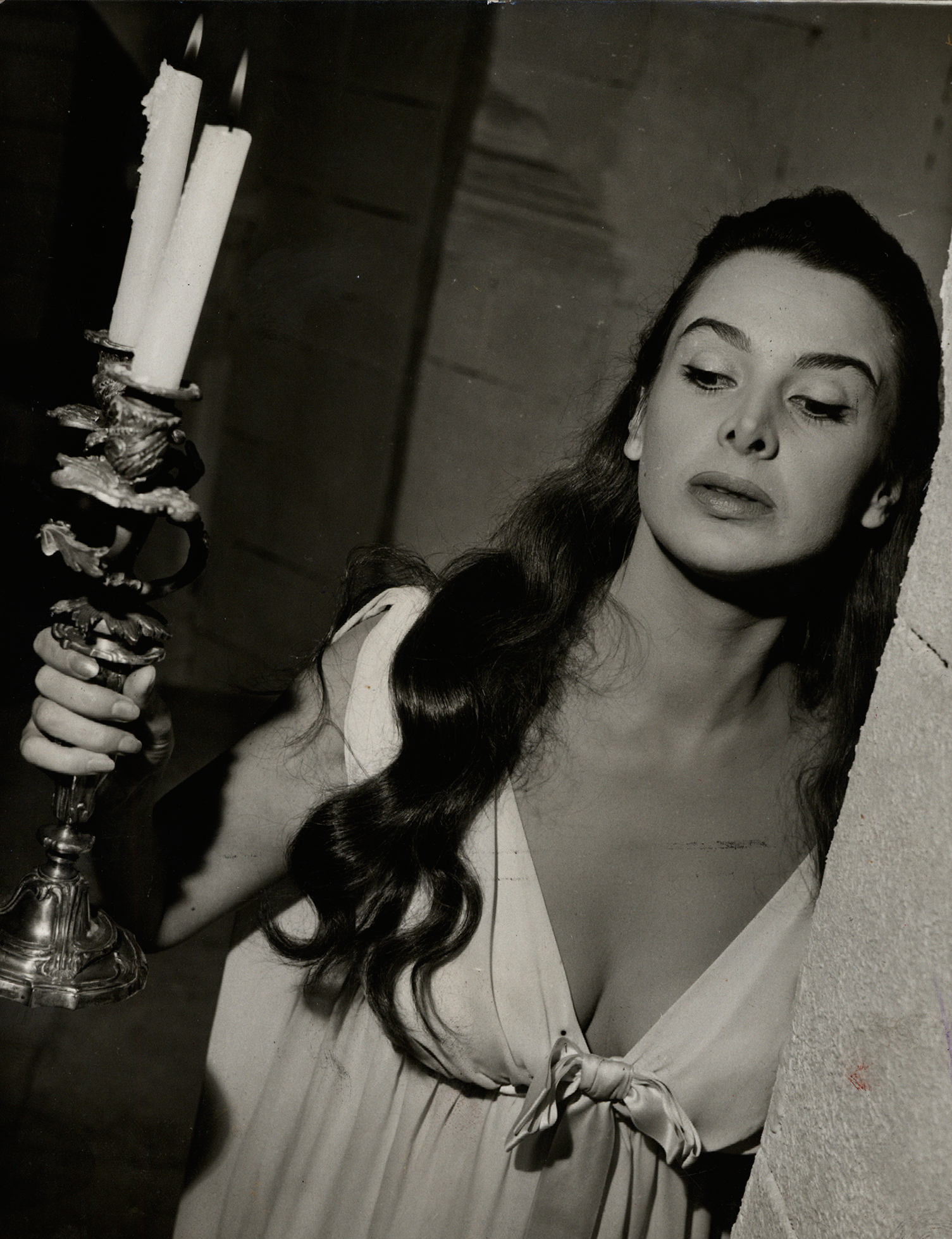
Rossi Drago in a publicity still for La Tour, prends garde ! (1958).

- The Pirates of Capri (1949) – Annette
- Altura (1949) – Grazia
- Due sorelle amano (1950) – Marilù, Maria Pia's sister
- Behind Closed Shutters (1951) – Sandra
- Verginità (1951) – Mara Sibilia
- The Last Sentence (1951) – Marisa
- Barefoot Savage (1952) – Franca Gabrie
- Girls Marked Danger (1952) – Alda
- The Flame (1952) – Monica
- Three Forbidden Stories (1952) – Gianna Aragona (Third segment)
- I sette dell'Orsa maggiore (1953) – Marion
- The Slave (1953) – Elena Landa
- Daughters of Destiny (1954) – Angela Ascari / Farmgirl (segment "Elisabeth")
- Vestire gli ignudi (1954) – Ersilia Drei
- On Trial (L'affaire Maurizius) (1954) – Anna Jahn
- Le Amiche (1955) – Clelia
- A Woman Alone (1956) – Luisa
- The Awakening (1956) – Assunta – madre di Salvatore
- Il prezzo della gloria (1956) – Anna
- Kean: Genius or Scoundrel (1957) – Contessa Elena Koefeld
- Anyone Can Kill Me (1957) – Odette – la femme du directeur
- La Tour, prends garde ! (1958) – La comtesse Malvina d'Amalfi
- The Road a Year Long (1958) – Susanna
- Winter Holidays (1959) – La comtesse Paola Parioli
- Le Fric (1959) – Marina
- Dagli Appennini alle Ande (1959) – Marco's mother
- The Facts of Murder (1959) – L'Assassinata
- Violent Summer (1959) – Roberta Parmesan
- The Employee (1960) – Maria Jacobetti
- David and Goliath (1960) – Merab
- Under Ten Flags (1960) – Elsa
- La garçonnière (1960) – Giulia Fiorini
- The Red Hand (1960) – Violetta Scotoni
- Final Accord (1960) – Linda Valore
- Sword of the Conqueror (1961) – Rosmunda
- Pigeon Shoot (1961) – Anna
- Caccia all'uomo (1961) – Clara Ducci
- Love at Twenty (1962) – Valentina
- The Carpet of Horror (1962) – Mabel Hughes
- Anima nera (1962) – Alessandra
- Hypnosis (1962) – Magda Berger
- I Don Giovanni della Costa Azzurra (1962) – Jasmine
- Storm Over Ceylon (1963) – Maharani from Tungala
- Wounds of Hunger (1963) – The Widow
- Il treno del sabato (1964) – Rosy Pallante
- La Cittadella (1964, TV Mini-Series) – Francis Lawrence
- Let's Talk About Women (1964) – Indolent Lady
- Amore facile (1964) – Lisa Bollati (segment "Il vedovo bianco")
- Love and Marriage (1964) – (segment "Ultima carta, L'")
- Il disco volante (1964) – Clelia
- El Diablo también llora (1965) – Ana Sandoval
- I Kill, You Kill (1965) – Vera (segment "Il Plenilunio")
- Uncle Tom's Cabin (1965) – Mrs. Saint-Claire
- Su e giù (1965) – Violante Persici (segment " Il Colpo Del Leone")
- Assassination in Rome (1965) – Erika Tiller
- The Bible: In the Beginning... (1966) – Lot's Wife
- Mano di velluto (1966)
- El último sábado (1967)
- Love Problems (1968) – Countess
- Camille 2000 (1969) – Prudence
- Gli angeli del 2000 (1969) – Dory
- Dorian Gray (1970) – Esther Clouston
- In the Folds of the Flesh (1970) – Lucille / housekeeper (final film role)
