= Three Forbidden Stories =

- Directed by: Augusto Genina
- Written by: Augusto Genina; Vitaliano Brancati; Ercole Patti; Mino Maccari; Ivo Perilli
- Cinematography: G. R. Aldo
- Release date: 1952
- Country: Italy
- Language: Italian

Three Forbidden Stories (Italian: Tre storie proibite) is a 1952 Italian drama film directed by Augusto Genina. It is loosely based on the same real events that inspired Giuseppe De Santis' Rome 11:00.

== Cast ==
- Lia Amanda as Renata
- Antonella Lualdi as Anna Maria
- Eleonora Rossi Drago as Gianna Aragona
- Isa Pola as Signora Paola, mère de Renata
- Frank Latimore as Walter
- Gabriele Ferzetti as Mario
- Giulio Stival as Comm. Borsani
- Roberto Risso as Bernardo
- Charles Fawcett as Mottaroni
- Mariolina Bovo as Mimma
- Enrico Luzi as Tommaso
- Marcella Rovena as mother of Gianna
- Richard McNamara as Donato
