= M.M.M. 83 =

- Directed by: Sergio Bergonzelli
- Written by: Bitto Albertini, Sergio Bergonzelli
- Music by: Piero Piccioni
- Distributed by: Variety Distribution
- Release date: 1965
- Country: Italy
- Language: Italian

M.M.M. 83 (also known as Missione mortale Molo 83) is a 1965 Italian spy film directed by Sergio Bergonzelli.

== Cast ==
- Fred Beir as Jack Morris
- Gérard Blain as Robert Gibson
- Pier Angeli as Hélène Blanchard
- Silvia Solar as Janette
- Alberto Dalbés as Renard
- Gianni Solaro as Fiksch
- André Lorugues
- Mario Lanfranchi
- Ignazio Dolce
- Mario Magnolia
- Attilio Severini
