= Satan's Wife =

- Directed by: Pier Carpi
- Screenplay by: Pier Carpi
- Starring: Anne Heywood; Valentina Cortese; John Phillip Law
- Cinematography: Guglielmo Mancori
- Edited by: Manlio Camastro
- Music by: Stelvio Cipriani
- Release date: October 29, 1979
- Country: Italy
- Language: Italian

Satan's Wife (Italian: Un'ombra nell'ombra, also known as Ring of Darkness) is a 1979 Italian horror film directed by Pier Carpi.

== Plot ==
The Prince of Darkness seduces four young women, spreading his seed so that his scourge may take human form.

== Cast ==
- Anne Heywood as Carlotta Rhodes
- Valentina Cortese as Elena Merrill
- John Phillip Law as the Exorcist
- Frank Finlay as Paul
- Marisa Mell as Agatha
- Paola Tedesco as Anna Merrill
- Irene Papas as Raffaella
- Lara Wendel as Daria Rhodes
- Ian Bannen as the Professor
- Ezio Miani as Lucifer
- West Buchanan as Peter Rhodes
- Carmen Russo as the Dancer
- Patrizia Webley as a Prostitute

== Production ==
The film is an adaptation of the director's 1974 novel Un'ombra nell'ombra. It had the working title La signora delle mosche ('The Lady of the Flies'). Carpi's announced temptative cast included Jean Seberg, Terence Stamp, and Marilù Tolo.

The film had a troubled production, with shootings starting in January 1977, being interrupted after a few weeks for lack of funds, and resuming in early 1979, with producer Piero Amati replacing Carpi as director for several scenes. Amati went bankrupt shortly later.

It was one of several Italian films starring Anne Heywood.

== Release ==
The film was released in Italian cinemas in the fall of 1979. The original version of the film, lasting 106 minutes, is considered lost. The international version, lasting over 20 minutes less (85'), has been described as "lacking continuity in more than one point" because of the cuts.

== Reception ==
Domestically, the film bombed at the box office. Italian film historian Roberto Curti described the film as "an ambitious work, [...] with passages of minutious realism and oneiric, visionary and esoteric digressions".
