= Striker (1988 film) =

- Directed by: Enzo G. Castellari
- Screenplay by: Tito Carpi; Umberto Lenzi
- Story by: Vincenzo Mannino; Gianfranco Clerici
- Produced by: Giorgio Salvioni
- Starring: Frank Zagarino; Melonee Rodgers; John Phillip Law; John Steiner; Werner Pochath
- Cinematography: Sandro Mancori
- Edited by: Gianfranco Amicucci
- Music by: Detto Mariano
- Production company: Filmustang
- Release date: 17 March 1988 (Philippines)
- Country: Italy

Striker (also known as Combat Force; released in the Philippines as Nicaragua) is an Italian action film directed by Enzo G. Castellari. The film imitates the style of the Rambo movies.

== Cast ==
- John Phillip Law: Frank Morris
- Melonee Rodgers: Marta
- Frank Zagarino: Slade
- John Steiner: Kariasin
- Werner Pochath: Houtman
- Daniel Greene: Truck Driver

== Release ==
In the Philippines, the film was released as Nicaragua by Golden Films on March 17, 1988.

== Reception ==
From contemporary reviews, "Lor." of Variety reviewed the AIP Home Video release on January 16, 1989, declaring the film to be an "above-average Italian actioner" that was "attractively lensed on location in Santo Domingo" with the battles, captures and escapes being "well-executed by Enzo G. Castellari".
