= Renato Chiantoni =

Italian actor (1906–1979)

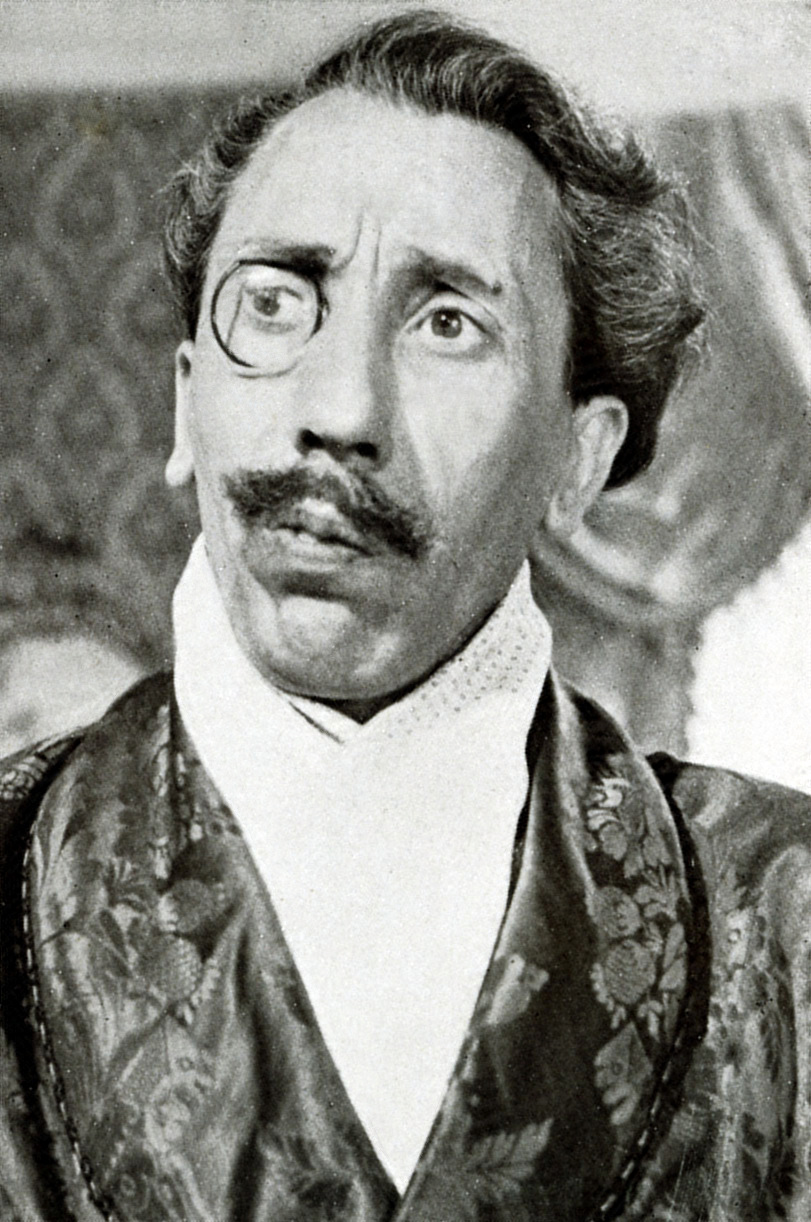
- Chiantoni in 1952
- Born: 19 April 1906; Lombardy, Italy
- Died: 24 December 1979 (aged 75); Rome, Italy
- Occupation: Actor
- Years active: 1937-1978

Renato Chiantoni (19 April 1906 – 24 December 1979) was an Italian actor. He appeared in 100 films between 1937 and 1978.

Born in Brescia, the son of the stage actor Amedeo, Chiantoni debuted on stage entering several drama and revue companies. He was later active as an actor of radio dramas. Very active in films as a character actor since the 1930s, after World War II Chiantoni also worked as a director of production and as a documentary director.

== Selected filmography ==
- Lowered Sails (1931)
- Gatta ci cova (1937) - Il cancelliere (The Chancellor)
- Tonight at Eleven (1938) - Il delatore del "Luna Bar" (Informer at the "Luna Bar")
- L'ultima carta (1938) - Il brigadiere Sarcot (Brigadier Sarcot)
- Il suo destino (1938) - Spilunga
- Ettore Fieramosca (1938) - Il messaggero di Graiano (The messenger of Graiano)
- L'ultimo scugnizzo (1938)
- Fuochi d'artificio (1938) - (uncredited)
- Tre fratelli in gamba (1939) - Il terzo fratello (The third brother)
- Il barone di Corbò (1939)
- La grande luce - Montevergine (1939) - Andrea Lori
- Guest for One Night (1939) - Truchet
- Piccolo hotel (1939)
- The Fornaretto of Venice (1939) - Il sarto testimone al processo (The Tailor, witness at the trial)
- Il segreto inviolabile (1939) - Tanaka, il poliziotto (Tanaka the policeman)
- The Hotel of the Absent (1939) - Il signore distinto con il monoclo (The distinguished gentleman with the monocle)
- Bridge of Glass (1940)
- Validità giorni dieci (1940) - Il giornalista (The journalist)
- The Two Mothers (1940)
- Il ponte dei sospiri (1940)
- The Palace on the River (1940) - Le scrittore illuso(The deluded writer)
- Il Bazar delle idee (1940)
- Captain Fracasse (1940) - Scapino
- Saint John, the Beheaded (1940) - The Defense Attorney [Script Name: Marcello]
- La Comédie du bonheur (1940) - L'imbonitore (Charlatan)
- The Mask of Cesare Borgia (1941) - Un paggio (A Page)
- The King's Jester (1941) - Il terzo zingaro (The third gypsy)
- Amore imperiale (1941) - Boris
- Cenerentola e il signor Bonaventura (1941) - Gambamoscia
- Capitan Tempesta (1942)
- Il leone di Damasco (1942)
- The Adventures of Fra Diavolo (1942) - Sputafuoco
- Wedding Day (1942) - L'avvocato del tappezziere (The upholsterer's lawyer) (uncredited)
- Colpi di timone (1942) - Un azionista all'assemblea (A shareholder at the meeting)
- Il birichino di papà (1943) - Il signore chiamato al telefono (The gentleman on the phone)
- Dagli Appennini alle Ande (1943)
- Il treno crociato (1943) - Vincenzo, un contadino (Vincenzo, a farmer) (uncredited)
- Gian Burrasca (1943) - Morlacchi
- Macario contro Zagomar (1944)
- L'abito nero da sposa (1945) - Bernardino
- Crime News (1947)
- The Charterhouse of Parma (1948) - Le soldat a la lettre anonyme (The soldier with the anonymous letter)
- Veglia nella notte (1948)
- Il corriere di ferro (1948)
- The Black Mask (1952) - Damprepois
- La donna che inventò l'amore (1952)
- Femmina senza cuore (1952)
- The Golden Coach (1952) - Capitaine Fracasse (uncredited)
- Nessuno ha tradito (1952)
- La storia del fornaretto di Venezia (1952)
- Addio, figlio mio! (1953)
- Puccini (1953) - Filippo Tacchi
- The Enchanting Enemy (1953)
- My Life Is Yours (1953)
- Cuore di spia (1953)
- Crossed Swords (1954) - Spiga
- The Barefoot Contessa (1954) - Maria Vargas' Father
- Days of Love (1954) - Francesco, zio di Angela (Francesco, Angela's uncle)
- If You Won a Hundred Million (1954) - Roberto Greppi (segment "Il pensionato")
- La grande avventura (1954)
- Le village magique (1955)
- Accadde tra le sbarre (1955) - Il Cavaliere - Mimì's employer
- Il campanile d'oro (1955)
- Rigoletto e la sua tragedia (1956) - The Court Poet
- Die Stimme der Sehnsucht (1956)
- Serenata al vento (1956)
- Occhi senza luce (1956) - prof. Guidotti
- Song of Naples (1957) - The Radio Broadcast Manager
- Un angelo è sceso a Brooklyn (1957) - Usher
- Serenate per 16 bionde (1957) - Professor Palazzo
- Mattino di primavera (1957)
- Gente felice (1957)
- Il Conte di Matera (1958) - Scherano guercio di Rimbaldo (Rambaldo's Henchman)
- Three Strangers in Rome (1958) - Pasquale, forester
- Pia de' Tolomei (1958)
- Il mondo dei miracoli (1959) - L'attore della compagnia Damiani (actor with the Damiani company)
- I'll See You in Hell (1960) - Paco
- Robin Hood and the Pirates (1960) - Gladiacove
- Romanoff and Juliet (1961) - Joseph the Pilot
- Il carabiniere a cavallo (1961) - Dr. Chiantini (uncredited)
- Stranger in Sacramento (1965) - Deputy
- La colt è la mia legge (1965) - Don Luis, Banker
- War Italian Style (1965) - Uncle Luigi
- Gold Train (1965) - Mr. Randall
- Le sedicenni (1965)
- Red Roses for Angelica (1966) - Direttore del Carcere (Prison Director)
- Web of Violence (1966)
- Arizona Colt (1966) - Undertaker
- El Cisco (1966) - Scrubby
- Il lungo, il corto, il gatto (1967) - Dottore (Doctor) (uncredited)
- La morte non conta i dollari (1967)
- Bang Bang Kid (1967) - Hotel Clerk
- Arabella (1967)
- I Want Him Dead (1968) - Duke Newton
- Trusting Is Good... Shooting Is Better (1968) - Dr. Aloisius
- Le 10 meraviglie dell'amore (1969) - Ispettore (Inspector)
- The Secret of Santa Vittoria (1969) - Bracolini
- Quell'amore particolare (1970)
- Colt in the Hand of the Devil (1970) - Peterson
- All the Colors of the Dark (1972) - Mr. Main
- Gang War in Naples (1972) - Capece's Accountant
- The Perfume of the Lady in Black (1974) - Luigi - the Porter (uncredited)
- Alla mia cara mamma nel giorno del suo compleanno (1974) - Anchise, domestico (Anchise the servant)
- Vergine, e di nome Maria (1975)
- Movie Rush - La febbre del cinema (1976) - Peppe
- La lunga strada senza polvere (1977) - Malko
- Per amore di Poppea (1977)
- Ride bene... chi ride ultimo (1977) - Journalist (segment "Sedotto e violentato") / Prisoner (segment "Prete per forza")
- Lo chiamavano Bulldozer (1978) - Ozgur
