= A Husband for Anna =

1953 film by Giuseppe De Santis

- Directed by: Giuseppe De Santis
- Written by: Giuseppe De Santis; Cesare Zavattini; Alfredo Giannetti; Salvatore Laurani; Elio Petri; Gianni Puccini
- Cinematography: Otello Martelli
- Music by: Rino Da Positano; Goffredo Petrassi
- Release date: 1953
- Country: Italy
- Language: Italian

A Husband for Anna (Italian: Un marito per Anna Zaccheo) is a 1953 Italian romance-drama film directed by Giuseppe De Santis.

== Cast ==
- Silvana Pampanini: Anna Zaccheo
- Amedeo Nazzari: Dr. Illuminato
- Massimo Girotti: Andrea Grazzi
- Umberto Spadaro: Don Antonio Percucoco
- Monica Clay: Miss Illuminato
- Anna Galasso: Miss Zaccheo
- Giovanni Berardi: Mr. Zaccheo
- Enrico Glori: Proprietario del cinema
- Enzo Maggio: Photographer
