= Pier Carpi =

Italian essayist, novelist, film director and screenwriter

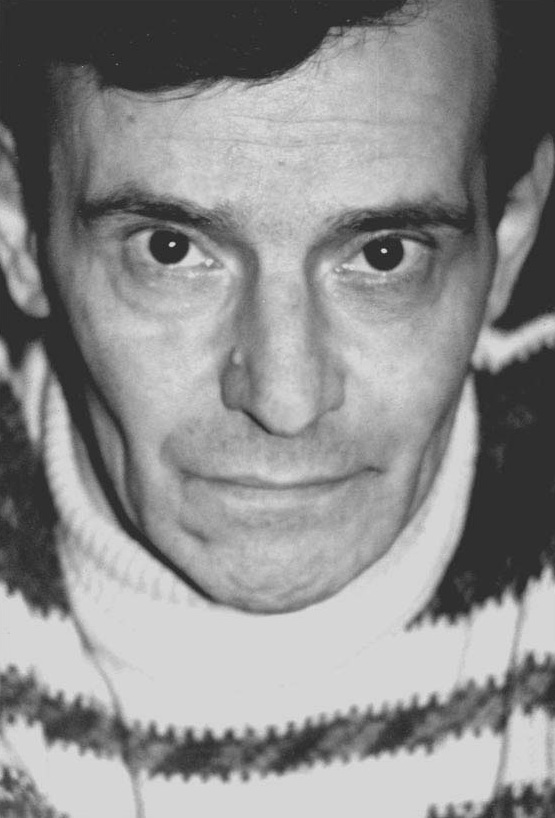
- Born: Arnaldo Piero Carpi; 16 January 1940; Arceto di Scandiano, Italy
- Died: 26 June 2000 (aged 60); Italy
- Occupations: Film director; writer; novelist

Arnaldo Piero "Pier" Carpi (16 January 1940 – 26 June 2000) was an Italian essayist, novelist, film director, screenwriter and comics writer.

== Life and career ==
Born in Scandiano, Carpi spent his childhood in a boarding school, never meeting his parents. He went on to study at art school and later collaborated with Gazzetta di Parma, before moving to Milan, where he worked in advertising as a ghost copywriter, and collaborated with the humorous magazine Bertoldo.

Carpi became first known as a comic book writer, penning about 60 Diabolik stories. In 1963, he began collaborating with Topolino, and starting from 1965 he created a number of series, notably the fumetti neri series Zakimort, I Naufraghi, Lancillotto, Nic Cometa and Teddy Bob, and also scripted Italian-produced stories of Superman and Batman. He later became editor of the comics magazine Il Mago, and in 1969, he co-founded with Alfredo Castelli the comics magazine Horror.

In 1964, Carpi made his literary debut with the novel La morte facile, and his variegated field of interests included historical monographies and essays, especially about esotericism. He was an admirer of Alessandro Cagliostro, whom according his 1972 biographical book Cagliostro il taumaturgo was "the last victim of the Inquisition". In 1975, he made his directorial debut with the successful Cagliostro, and then went on direct Povero Cristo and Satan's Wife.

Carpi was also known for his self-promotional activities, which often brought him significant newspaper coverage and included frequent high-profile accusations of plagiarism, notably against Franco Zeffirelli for Brother Sun, Sister Moon, and against Castellano & Pipolo for Loggerheads.

== Later years and death ==
A freemanson, in 1981, Carpi was involved in the Propaganda Due scandal, emerging as an affiliate of the secret lodge as well as a Licio Gelli's close friend and collaborator. Shortly later, he founded an association named "International Committee of Solidarity", which released material in defense of Gelli and was accused of being a cover for an attempt to re-establish the lodge, getting him incriminated for aiding and abetting. His career was subsequently seriously affected by legal issues, and many of his announced projects were never realized.

In 1993, Carpi collaborated with the screenplay of Memè Perlini's film Il ventre di Maria, and in the mid-1990s, he briefly returned to comics, collaborating in a few issues of Martin Mystère and its spin-off series Zona X. During the same period, he joined the Lega Nord party and founded an association in support of Irene Pivetti. He died of heath attack on 26 June 2000, at the age of 60.
