= Guest for One Night =

- Directed by: Giuseppe Guarino
- Written by: Mario Costa; Giuseppe Guarino
- Produced by: Ettore Catalucci
- Starring: Gian Paolo Rosmino; Ugo Sasso; Guglielmo Barnabò
- Cinematography: Giulio Rufini
- Edited by: Otello Colangeli
- Music by: Umberto Gelassi
- Production company: Sviluppo Pellicole e Stampa
- Distributed by: ENIC
- Release date: 20 June 1939
- Running time: 66 minutes
- Country: Italy
- Language: Italian

Guest for One Night (Italian: L'ospite di una notte) is a 1939 Italian film directed by Giuseppe Guarino and starring Gian Paolo Rosmino, Ugo Sasso, and Guglielmo Barnabò.

It was made at the Titanus Studios in Rome.

== Cast ==
- Gian Paolo Rosmino as L'ispettore Lasalle
- Ugo Sasso as L'ispettore Dunois
- Giovanni Dal Cortivo as Il conte de Meral
- Guglielmo Barnabò as Alberto de Meral
- Vasco Creti as Giacomo
- Renato Chiantoni as Truchet
- Carlo Tamberlani as Jean Berry
- Tosca Sartoris as Germana
- Neda Naldi as Paola
- Gabriella Silvestri as Olga de Meral
- Diego Pozzetto as Mattia
- Amina Pirani Maggi as Caterina
- Pina Gallini as Maria
- Romolo Bernasconi
- Lina Colombo
- Cesare Fantoni
- Aristide Garbini
- Walter Grant
- Nora Lenner
- Vittorio Leoni
- Orofilo Maldini
- Elvira Paolini
- Antonio Ranieri
- Giovanni Ribocchi
- Dante Rivera
- Enzo Russo
- Virgilio Scacchieri
- Lorenzo Scategni
- Giovanni Setali
- Elettra Terzolo
- Germana Vivian

== Bibliography ==
- Pasquale Sorrenti. Il cinema e la Puglia. Schena, 1984.
