= Seven in the Sun =

- Directed by: Sergio Bergonzelli
- Written by: Sergio Bergonzelli; Frank Gregory
- Starring: Frank Latimore; Gianna Maria Canale
- Cinematography: Alberto Fusi
- Edited by: Alberto Gallitti
- Music by: Aldo Piga
- Release date: 1960
- Language: Italian

Seven in the Sun (Italian: Gli avventurieri dei Tropici) is a 1960 Italian adventure film written and directed by Sergio Bergonzelli and starring Frank Latimore and Gianna Maria Canale.

== Cast ==
- Frank Latimore as Frank
- Gianna Maria Canale as Libertà
- Saro Urzì as Fernand
- John Kitzmiller as Salvador
- Marisa Belli as Jana
- Marco Guglielmi
- Eduardo Passarelli
