= Days of Love =

1954 Italian comedy film

- Film poster
- Directed by: Giuseppe De Santis
- Written by: Libero De Libero; Giuseppe De Santis; Elio Petri; Gianni Puccini
- Starring: Marcello Mastroianni
- Cinematography: Otello Martelli
- Edited by: Gabriele Varriale
- Music by: Mario Nascimbene
- Release date: 1 October 1954
- Running time: 98 minutes
- Country: Italy
- Language: Italian

Days of Love (Italian: Giorni d'amore) is a 1954 Italian comedy film directed by Giuseppe De Santis.

== Cast ==
- Marcello Mastroianni as Pasquale Droppio
- Marina Vlady as Angela Cafalla
- Giulio Calì as Pietro Cafalla, Angela's grandfather
- Angelina Longobardi as Concetta Cafalla, Angela's mother
- Dora Scarpetta as Nunziata, Angela's sister
- Fernando Jacovolta as Adolfo Cafalla, Angela's brother
- Renato Chiantoni as Francesco, Angela's uncle
- Lucien Gallas as Oreste Droppio, Pasquale's father
- Cosimo Poerio as Onorato Droppio, Pasquale's grandfather
- Pina Gallini as Filomena Droppio, Pasquale's grandmother
- Angelina Chiusano as Loreta Droppio, Pasquale's mother
- Franco Avallone as Leopoldo Droppio, Pasquale's brother
- Santina Tucci as Teresa Droppio, Pasquale's sister
- Gildo Bocci as The marshal
- Pietro Tordi as The parish priest
