= I Love You (1986 film) =

1986 film

- Film poster
- Directed by: Marco Ferreri
- Written by: Marco Ferreri; Enrico Oldoini; Didier Kaminka
- Produced by: Maurice Bernart
- Starring: Christopher Lambert
- Cinematography: William Lubtchansky
- Edited by: Ruggero Mastroianni
- Production companies: Alliance Film Communication (AFC); 23 Giugno; UGC / Top 1 Films A2
- Distributed by: UGC Distribution (France); Columbia Pictures Italia (Italy)
- Release dates: 14 May 1986 (France); 18 September 1986 (Italy)
- Running time: 101 minutes
- Countries: France; Italy
- Language: French

I Love You is a 1986 drama film directed by Marco Ferreri. It was entered into the 1986 Cannes Film Festival.

== Cast ==
- Christopher Lambert - Michel
- Eddy Mitchell - Yves
- Agnès Soral - Hélène
- Anémone - Barbara
- Flora Barillaro - Maria
- Marc Berman - Pierre
- Patrice Bertrand - The angry client
- Paula Dehelly - Pierre's mother
- Maurizio Donadoni - Georges
- Fabrice Dumeur - Marcel
- Carole Fredericks - Angèle
- Laurence Le Guellan - Nicole
- Jean Reno - The dentist
- Olinka Hardiman - The teacher
- Laura Manszky - Camelia / Isabelle
- Jeanne Marine - The prostitute

== Release ==
I Love You was released in France on May 14, 1986. It was released in Genoa, Italy on September 18, 1986.

== Awards ==
It was entered into the 1986 Cannes Film Festival. The film was selected to compete for the Palme d'or at the Cannes Film Festival, and was nominated for the Silver Ribbon at the Italian National Syndicate of Film Journalists.
