= John Phillip Law =

American actor (1937–2008)

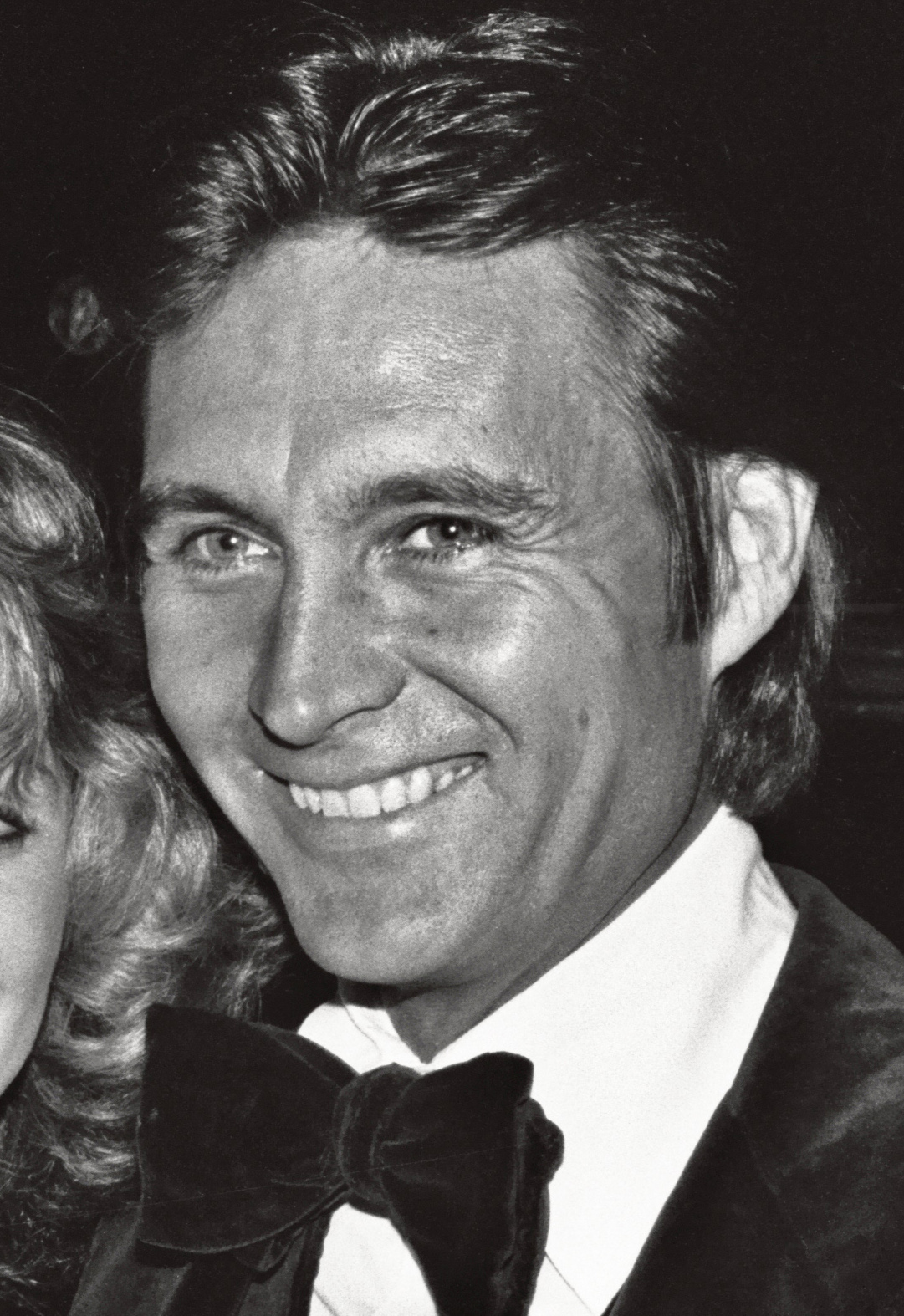
- Law in 1979
- Born: September 7, 1937; Hollywood, Los Angeles, California, U.S.
- Died: May 13, 2008 (aged 70); Los Angeles, California, U.S.
- Occupations: Film, television actor
- Years active: 1950–2008
- Spouse: Shawn Ryan (divorced)
- Children: 1

John Phillip Law (September 7, 1937 – May 13, 2008) was an American actor.

Following a breakthrough role as a Russian sailor in The Russians Are Coming, the Russians Are Coming (1966), Law became best known for his roles as gunfighter Bill Meceita in the spaghetti western Death Rides a Horse (1967) with Lee Van Cleef, the blind angel Pygar in the fantasy film Barbarella (1968) with Jane Fonda, the title character in the action film Danger: Diabolik (1968), Manfred von Richthofen in Von Richthofen and Brown (1971), and news anchor Robin Stone in The Love Machine (1971). The latter reteamed him with Alexandra Hay, his co-star from the 1968 "acid comedy" Skidoo. His most famous role is that of Sinbad in The Golden Voyage of Sinbad (1973), which was a worldwide box office hit and won the first Saturn Award for Best Fantasy Film.

== Early life ==
Law was born in Los Angeles, California, to John Law, a deputy sheriff, and Phyllis Sallee, a Broadway actress. At college, he initially studied engineering before transferring to the University of Hawaiʻi to study psychology and drama.

As a child, he played a page in The Magnificent Yankee.

== Career ==
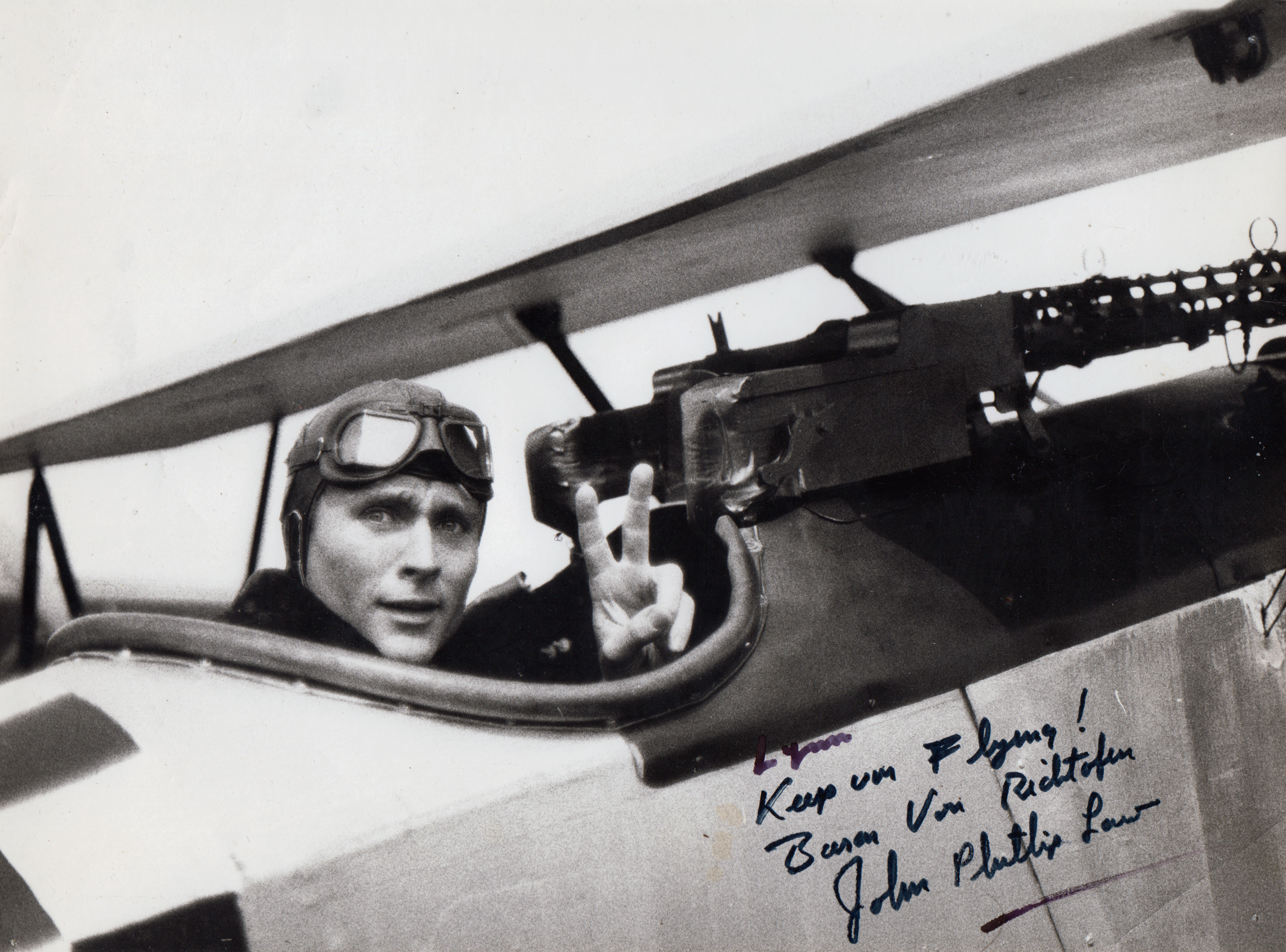
Law in Von Richthofen and Brown

Upon finishing college, Law appeared in Garson Kanin's Come on Strong (1962), and worked for three years at the Repertory Theater at the Lincoln Center, where he acted in their productions of Marco's Millions, The Changeling, and Tartuffe. After leaving, he moved to Europe where he appeared in High Infidelity and Three Nights of Love.

Law was cast by director Norman Jewison as the young English-speaking Russian sailor Alexei Kolchin in The Russians Are Coming, the Russians Are Coming (1966), after the director saw him in an Italian movie. A year later, he played a farmer in Otto Preminger's Hurry Sundown, where he starred alongside Jane Fonda and Michael Caine. Later that year, he acted in spaghetti western Death Rides a Horse with Lee Van Cleef. The following year, he played the title role of Danger: Diabolik, an angel in Barbarella (reuniting him with Fonda), as well as roles in Skidoo and The Sergeant. Although he was initially cast in The Gypsy Moths, his part was later recast. He turned down roles in Midnight Cowboy and Easy Rider.

He had a cameo role in The Last Movie (1971), which also marked the release of Von Richthofen and Brown, with Law playing Manfred von Richthofen. For the role, Law learnt how to take off and land an aircraft. Later that year, he starred in The Love Machine, based on Jacqueline Susann's novel of the same name. Throughout the early seventies, he had parts in Polvere di stelle, The Golden Voyage of Sinbad, Open Season, and The Spiral Staircase.

Law continued to find success in Europe, acting in Docteur Justice (1975), A Whisper in the Dark (1976), Tu dios y mi infierno (1976), The Cassandra Crossing (1977), Target of an Assassin (1977), Eyes Behind the Wall (1977), The Rider on the White Horse (1978), and The Devil's Bed (1978). In the later 1970s, Law returned to America, where he acted in The Best Place to Be and Satan's Wife.

Law continued to act, taking roles in Attack Force Z (1981), Tin Man (1983), Night Train to Terror (1985), American Commandos (1985), Moon in Scorpio (1987), Thunder Warrior III (1988), Striker (1988), Una grande storia d'amore (1988), Space Mutiny (1988), Blood Delirium (1988), A Case of Honor (1989), and Cold Heat (1989). He also appeared in Alienator (1990), Shining Blood (1992), Il giorno del porco (1993), The Mountain of the Lord (1993), Hindsight (1996), My Magic Dog (1998), Wanted (1999), and Bad Guys (2000). In 2001, he appeared in Roman Coppola's directorial debut CQ. His final roles included Curse of the Forty-Niner (2002) (which he also associate produced), The Three Faces of Terror (2004), and Ray of Sunshine (2006). His last credited film role was in 2008's I Am Somebody: No Chance in Hell.

== Personal life ==
Law married and later divorced actress Shawn Ryan, with whom he had a daughter. His brother Tom was a hippie commune leader in Taos NM and Woodstock music festival (1969) personage. Tom's ex-wife is photographer Lisa Law.

== Death ==
On December 13, 2007, his doctors diagnosed Law with pancreatic cancer. He died five months later on May 13, 2008, aged 70, at his home in Los Angeles.

== Selected filmography ==
- 1950 The Magnificent Yankee as Minor Role (scenes deleted)
- 1951 Show Boat as Extra (uncredited)
- 1962 Smog (uncredited)
- 1964 High Infidelity as Ronald (segment "Scandaloso")
- 1964 Three Nights of Love as Fra Felice (segment "Fatebenefratelli")
- 1966 The Russians Are Coming, the Russians Are Coming as Alexei Kolchin
- 1967 Hurry Sundown as Rad McDowell
- 1967 Death Rides a Horse as Bill Meceita
- 1967 Her Harem (uncredited)
- 1968 Danger: Diabolik as Diabolik
- 1968 Barbarella as Pygar
- 1968 Skidoo as "Stash"
- 1968 The Sergeant as Private First Class Tom Swanson
- 1969 Diary of a Telephone Operator as Crispino
- 1970 The Hawaiians as Noel Hoxworth
- 1970 Strogoff as Michael Strogoff
- 1971 Von Richthofen and Brown as Manfred von Richthofen
- 1971 The Love Machine as Robin Stone
- 1971 The Last Movie as Little Brother (cameo)
- 1973 Polvere di stelle as John
- 1973 The Golden Voyage of Sinbad as Sinbad the Sailor
- 1974 Open Season as Greg Anderson
- 1975 The Spiral Staircase as Steven Sherman
- 1975 Docteur Justice as Dr. Benjamin Justice
- 1976 A Whisper in the Dark as Alex
- 1976 Tu dios y mi infierno as Martín
- 1976 The Cassandra Crossing as Major Stark
- 1977 Target of an Assassin as Shannon
- 1977 Eyes Behind the Wall as Arturo
- 1978 The Rider on the White Horse as Hauke Haien
- 1978 The Devil's Bed as John Vanetti
- 1979 The Best Place to Be as Dr. Gary Mancini
- 1979 Satan's Wife as The Exorcist
- 1980 The Pioneers as A.P. Karns
- 1981 Attack Force Z as Lieutenant Jan Veitch
- 1981 Tarzan, the Ape Man as Harry Holt
- 1982 The Love Boat as George Wetlin (Season 5, Episode 16)
- 1983 Tin Man as Dr. Edison
- 1984 No Time to Die as Ted Barner
- 1985 Night Train to Terror as Harry Billings (segment "The Case of Harry Billings")
- 1985 American Commandos as Kelly
- 1985 Rainy Day Friends as Dr. Stephen Kendrick
- 1987 Johann Strauss: The King Without a Crown as Maximilian Steiner
- 1987 Moon in Scorpio as Allen
- 1987 Colpo di stato as Shaw
- 1988 Thunder Warrior III as Sheriff Jeff
- 1988 Striker as Frank Morris
- 1988 Space Mutiny as Flight Commander Elijah Kalgan
- 1988 Blood Delirium as Saint Simon
- 1989 A Case of Honor as Captain Roger L. Barnes
- 1989 Cold Heat as R.C. Mallon
- 1989 Nerds of a Feather (uncredited)
- 1989 The Young and the Restless as Dr. Jim Grainger
- 1990 Alienator as Ward Armstrong
- 1990 Little Women of Today as Tycoon
- 1991 Alaska Stories as Aristocratic Con Man
- 1992 Marilyn Alive and Behind Bars as Harry Billings
- 1992 Il giorno del porco as Azazel
- 1992 Europa Mission as Colonel Ferri
- 1992 Shining Blood as "Heep"
- 1993 The Mountain of the Lord as Brigham Young
- 1993 Angel Eyes as Steven Fox
- 1995 Brennendes Herz as Böhme
- 1996 Hindsight as Vincent
- 1998 My Magic Dog as Peter Avelino
- 1999 Wanted as Pursuing Rider
- 2000 Bad Guys as Sheriff
- 2001 CQ as The Chairman
- 2002 Curse of the Forty-Niner as Sheriff Murphy
- 2004 The Three Faces of Terror as Professor Peter Price
- 2006 Ray of Sunshine
- 2008 I Am Somebody: No Chance in Hell as Foreman Dan
- 2012 L'apocalisse delle scimmie
