= Rainy Day Friends =

- Directed by: Gary Kent
- Written by: Gary Kent
- Produced by: Tomi Barrett; Walter Boxer
- Starring: Esai Morales; Janice Rule; Chuck Bail; Carrie Snodgress; John Phillip Law
- Cinematography: Ronald Garcia
- Edited by: Peter Appleton
- Music by: Jimmie Haskell
- Production company: Signature Productions
- Distributed by: PowerDance Corporation
- Release date: December 19, 1985 (Los Angeles)
- Running time: 99 minutes 105 minutes
- Country: United States
- Language: English

Rainy Day Friends is a 1985 American drama film written and directed by Gary Kent, starring Esai Morales, Chuck Bail, Janice Rule, Carrie Snodgress and John Phillip Law. Morales plays a Mexican-American teenager who is suffering from cancer, and must learn to cope with the patients and staff at the hospital where he undergoes treatment. It is also known by the video title L.A. Bad.

== Cast ==
- Esai Morales as Neekos Valdez
- Chuck Bail as Jack Marti
- Janice Rule as Dr. Elaine Hammond
- Carrie Snodgress as Margot Fisher
- Lelia Goldoni as Barbara Marti
- John Phillip Law as Stephen Kendricks
- Tomi Barrett as Shirley Felton
- Anne Betancourt as Josephina Valdez

== Production ==
The film was the brainchild of veteran stuntman Gary Kent and his wife Tomi Barrett, who had also worked in film. They were inspired by the cancer struggles of one of Barrett's family members, which had motivated their move to her home state of Texas. The tragic story of a troubled youth from New Jersey, who died from cancer in his car after being kicked out by his parents, provided a more direct narrative starting point. An uplifting article by Los Angeles Times freelance writer Sandra Hanson Konte about her own struggle with cancer, and a docudrama made by University of Texas student Kevin Wilson, which used a football game as an allegory for the fight against the illness, informed the film's more optimistic twist on its real-world inspiration. Kent tried to eschew the more downbeat aspects of films such as Terms of Endearment, while stopping short of promoting unrealistic hopes of survival. Barrett herself later died from cancer in 2005.

It took the couple between five and six years to research the subject, write the script and find financing, during which Barrett periodically took jobs as a secretary to make ends meet. The bulk of the financing came from San Antonio investors. Another article names Bill R. Willeford of Warton, a relative of Barrett's who did not live to see the film's release, as a supporter. The film's production manager Marty Hornstein had previously worked on Bad Boys, and recommended Esai Morales for the lead role. The young actor immediately won Kent over with his audition. Principal photography started on February 27, 1984. While the film was shot in Los Angeles, a large part of the crew came from Texas. She also ensured a large female representation, which ended up making up more than half of the film's personnel. Although AMPAS files indicate that the film had wrapped by the end of March, a newspaper profile of actress Carrie Snodgress suggests that filming extended into April.

== Release ==
=== Pre-release ===
Rainy Day Friends was screened for industry professionals during the 1985 Cannes Film Market. In October 1985, Barrett established Austin-based PowerDance Corporation to oversee the film's distribution and future endeavors. Kent served as vice-president of the company.

=== Theatrical ===
The film was first booked for a one-week engagement at the Fox International Theatre in Venice, California, starting on December 19, 1985. The press described the move as an attempt to qualify it for the upcoming Oscar campaign, which the Los Angeles Times' Kevin Thomas derided as delusional. An advertisement touting Esai Morales as a possible Academy Award nominee was in fact circulated in the press soon after.

The film appeared in the New York City market at the Embassy Theatre on July 2, 1986. In a nationally syndicated August 1986 column, entertainment writer Pat Hilton announced that the film was being readied for a September release. A test release in Seattle was also mentioned by the filmmakers, but no date could be found for it at the time of writing. It resurfaced the following spring in Texas, opening in several cities on May 1, 1987.

=== Home video ===
The film debuted on videotape on June 2, 1988, through Prism Entertainment, under the new moniker of L.A. Bad. Although Kent was opposed to it, the new title was tacked on by Arnold Kopelson, who had bought rights to the movie, to emphasize the crime angle and improve its commercial prospects.

Despite its piecemeal release, Kent claimed that the film was quite successful from a commercial standpoint, progressively racking up international sales that saw it reach 42 countries. According to him, he and his wife were able to live off the film's proceeds for four years. On December 21, 2011, Kent announced that he had finished work on a self-distributed DVD re-issue of the film.

== Reception ==
According to Kent, the film's uplifting message garnered a very warm reception from the American Cancer Society. However, appraisal from professional critics was mostly negative, with the majority of encouraging comments singling out Esai Morales' performance.

Kevin Thomas of the Los Angeles Times was unimpressed, describing it "as well-meaning as it is miscalculated", and finding Morales' talents wasted on an overbearing character. Vincent Canby of The New York Times gave the film a negative review, writing that it "is so stuffed with positive thinking that it seems grossly overweight, though dramatically frail. There's not a spontaneous moment in the movie." Along the same lines, Harry Haun of the New York Daily News deemed it "a mindless mass of gravel and goo", although "Esai Morales gives, under the circumstances, a rather admirable account of the young patient". In his syndicated Gannett review, William Wolf wrote that "Rainy Day Friends is a well-meant independent film that one would like to applaud, but it just isn't very good." Mary Beth Crain of L.A. Weekly lamented that the film's angry, socially-conscious message was wasted on a cast of characters that amounted to "a whole slew of walking platitudes". Richard Freedman of Newhouse News Service drew parallels with El Norte and Champions, but deemed that "in its stolid overplotting and high-mindedness, it somehow adds up to less than the sum of those two superior films."

Among moderate to positive opinions, Mike McGrady deemed it "a low budget film, complete with all the flaws attendant to the genre", although "it does have its moments." He praised the setpiece that sees the young hero dragged by a truck, but noted that "[t]here is danger, however, in beginning a film at such a high pitch of excitement. Nothing else comes close in the movie to that level of film making, and the rest must suffer by comparison." Patrick Taggart of the Austin American-Statesman lauded the decision to tackle such a commercially challenging topic. While he acknowledged that the parts dealing with the administrative system were "overdrawn", he commanded the film's moments of levity and solid acting, concluding that "[w]hen Jack finally gets his spiritual motor running in the later part of the film, Rainy Day Friends becomes a winner." David Pickering of the Corpus Christi Times deemed that the film's immigration subplots were hastily set aside in the later parts, but "deserved credits for excelling in several areas—notably, in its frank and sensitive treatment of cancer". He also called the truck stunt "a standout".

=== Accolades ===
The film's most celebrated scene is a stunt where the lead character gets his foot tangled in a rope attached to a truck, causing him to get dragged across the pavement amidst vehicular traffic. For his performance, future blockbuster mainstay Spiro Razatos (who doubled for Morales) earned early acclaim in the Best Specialty Stunt category of the 1986 Stuntman Awards.

Date	Location	Award	Category	Recipient	Result	Ref
March 23, 1986	KTLA Studios, Hollywood	2nd Annual Stuntman Awards	Best Specialty Stunt	Spiro Razatos	Won	
