= Stranger in Sacramento =

1965 film

Uno straniero a Sacramento
- Directed by: Sergio Bergonzelli
- Written by: Sergio Bergonzelli
- Story by: Jim Murphy (novel)
- Starring: Mickey Hargitay
- Cinematography: Bitto Albertini
- Music by: Felice Di Stefano
- Release date: 1965
- Running time: 89 minutes
- Country: Italy
- Language: Italian

Stranger in Sacramento or Uno straniero a Sacramento is a 1965 Italian Spaghetti Western film directed by Sergio Bergonzelli. It was based on the novel I Will Kill You Tomorrow by Jim Murphy.

== Cast ==
- Mickey Hargitay as Mike Jordan
- Enrico Bomba as Chris (as Steve Saint-Claire)
- Mario Lanfranchi as Mill (as Johnny Jordan)
- Giulio Marchetti as Sheriff Joe (as James Hill)
- Florencia Silvero as Lisa (as Flo Silver)
- Barbara Frey as Rona Barret
- Big Matthews (as Big I. Matthews)
- Gia Sandri
- Luciano Benetti as Deputy sheriff (as Lucky Bennett)
- Gabriella Giorgelli as Rosa (saloon dancer)
- Ariel Brown
- Renato Chiantoni
- Franco Gulà
- Romano Giomini
- Julián Marcos

== Plot ==
During a cattle drive, Mike Jordan finds his father and brothers murdered and the herd stolen. He is met with suspicion by the local sheriff and the population. Eventually, Mike is able to expose the rancher Barret as the perpetrator. He is assisted by Lisa, Barret's former sister-in-law, and Chris, a wanted horse thief.

== Reception ==
In his investigation of narrative structures in Spaghetti Western films, Fridlund discusses Stranger in Sacramento among films that mix some characters, motifs and plots well known from American traditional Westerns with others usual in Spaghetti Westerns. For example, Mike Jordan is close to the typical American Western hero, while Chris is more like Joe in A Fistful of Dollars.
