= Povero Cristo =

- Directed by: Pier Carpi
- Written by: Pier Carpi
- Starring: Mino Reitano; Rosemary Dexter; Raoul Grassilli
- Cinematography: Guglielmo Mancori
- Edited by: Daniele Alabiso
- Music by: Mario Migliardi
- Release date: 1975
- Country: Italy
- Language: Italian

Povero Cristo is 1975 Italian film written and directed by Pier Carpi.

== Plot ==
A young man with aspirations of becoming a private investigator is approached by a stranger who promises 100 million lire if he obtains evidence of the existence of Jesus Christ.

== Cast ==
- Mino Reitano as Giorgio Cavero / Jesus Christ
- Rosemarie Dexter as Mara / Mary Magdalene
- Raoul Grassilli as Commissioner Petra / Pontius Pilate
- Curd Jürgens as Stranger who hires Giorgio
- Edmund Purdom as Man in a tailcoat / Satan
- Ida Galli as Giorgio's mother / Mary
- Roberto Brivio as Basta / Barabbas
- Paolo Gozlino as Senior dancer / John the Baptist
- Giovanni Brusatori as Gavetta / Judas
- Enrico Beruschi as Perota / Peter
- Giancarlo Badessi as Director / Herod
- Franco Ressel as Convicted / Penitent thief
- Saverio Mosca as Convicted / Impenitent thief
- Adolfo Lastretti as Policeman / Centurion
- Sonia Viviani

== Production ==
The film is based on the Pier Carpi's novel Gesù contro Cristo ('Jesus versus Christ'), which was written in 1973, but was rejected by numerous publishers and remained unpublished until Simonelli released it in 1997. While credited to Carpi, the actual director of the film was his assistant Gianni Siragusa, with Carpi only supervising the shootings. Announcing the film, Carpi described the film as "a religious giallo".

== Release ==
The film premiered at the 34th Venice International Film Festival, in the Spazio Aperto sidebar. It was released in Italian cinemas in January 1976.
