= Good News (1979 film) =

1979 Italian film

- Directed by: Elio Petri
- Written by: Elio Petri
- Produced by: Giancarlo Giannini; Elio Petri
- Starring: Giancarlo Giannini
- Cinematography: Tonino Nardi
- Edited by: Ruggero Mastroianni
- Music by: Ennio Morricone
- Distributed by: Medusa
- Release date: 1979 (Italy)
- Running time: 105 minutes
- Language: Italian

Good News (Italian: Buone notizie) is a 1979 Italian satirical comedy film written and directed by Elio Petri and starring Giancarlo Giannini. It was Petri's last film, produced by him and Giannini.

== Plot ==
An anonymous employee of a television company leads a seemingly ordinary life, going to work every day and returning home to his wife in the evening. At his job, he is constantly confronted with images of violence and disasters, to which he shows no reaction, while his marriage is marked by his and his wife Fedora's inability to communicate. He makes sexual advances to his colleague Tignetti and Fedora's friend Benedetta, but is rejected by both.

One day, he is contacted by his old schoolfriend Gualtiero whom he hasn't seen in 15 years. Gualtiero confides that he is being followed by enemies determined to kill him, although he has no idea who these enemies could be. Eventually, Gualtiero agrees to be committed to a mental hospital. The man has an erotic interlude with Gualtiero's wife Ada, but due to their psychological deficiencies, they are unable to sleep with each other. Later, he learns from Fedora that she is pregnant.

When the man sees a TV news report covering Gualtiero's violent death, he rushes to the hospital, where he breaks down in tears. The motive for the murder remains unclear, as the victim might as well have been mistaken for one of the clinic's prominent political patients. At Gualtiero's funeral, Fedora confesses that it is his dead friend's child she is expecting. Furious at first, the man agrees with her to have the child. Back at work, he receives an envelope from Gualtiero with the words "not to be opened" written on it. He opens it, only to find a vast number of cards inside with the same words printed on them.

== Cast ==
- Giancarlo Giannini as the man
- Ángela Molina as Fedora
- Paolo Bonacelli as Gualtiero Milano
- Aurore Clément as Ada
- Ombretta Colli as Tignetti
- Ritza Brown as Benedetta
- Franco Iavarone as commissioner
- Ninetto Davoli as trade unionist

== Production ==
The role of Gualtiero had originally been intended for Michel Piccoli before Paolo Bonacelli took the part.

== Reception ==
The film's critical reception was mixed. Cinema Nuovo faulted a too general perspective on contemporary society, while Giovanni Grazzini in Corriere della Sera noted that "the staging is very effective but the film struggles to assume the airy and compelling logic of the surreal parable". Dario Zanelli in Il Resto del Carlino came to a more positive conclusion, acknowledging an "enthralling impetus" in the way the film addressed its subject matter, and an "ambiguous Bunuelian flavour" in its final scenes. In her 1986 book on Italian cinema, Mira Liehm criticised Good News as a "somewhat naive treatise about sexual obsessions and the fear of death".
