= Neda Naldi =

Italian actor and screenwriter (1913–1993)

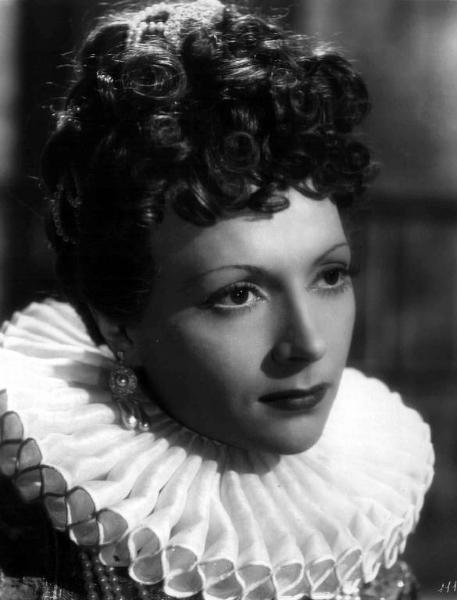
- Born: 30 January 1913; Tramutola, Italy
- Died: 26 June 1993 (aged 80); Roma, Italy
- Other name: Talia Volpiana
- Occupation: Actress
- Years active: 1938–1977

Neda Naldi (30 January 1913 – 26 June 1993) was an Italian theatrical actress—also known under her stage name Talia Volpiana—and television and film actress. She was born as Italia Volpiana on 30 January 1913 in Tramutola, Basilicata, Italy. She was an actress and writer, known for La leggenda azzurra (1940), Lacrime di sangue (1944) and Vietato ai minorenni (1944). She was married to Salvo Randone. She died on 26 June 1993 in Rome, Lazio, Italy.

== Selected filmography ==
- Guest for One Night (1939)
- The Sons of the Marquis Lucera (1939)
