= La garçonnière =

1960 film directed by Giuseppe De Santis

- Directed by: Giuseppe De Santis
- Written by: Ugo Pirro; Giuseppe De Santis; Franco Giraldi; Tonino Guerra; Elio Petri
- Starring: Raf Vallone; Eleonora Rossi Drago
- Cinematography: Roberto Gerardi
- Edited by: Otello Colangeli
- Music by: Mario Nascimbene
- Distributed by: Variety Distribution
- Release date: 1960
- Language: Italian

La garçonnière ("The bachelor apartment") is a 1960 Italian romance-drama film written and directed by Giuseppe De Santis.

== Plot ==
A building constructor repeatedly betrays his wife in an apartment he rented in a popular neighborhood. She pawns him, finds out the truth and leaves him. The couple will recover together, but things will never be the same again.

== Cast ==
- Raf Vallone as Alberto Fiorini
- Eleonora Rossi Drago as Giulia Fiorini
- Marisa Merlini as Pupa
- Gordana Miletic as Laura
- Nino Castelnuovo as Vincenzo
- Maria Fiore as Clementina
- Clelia Matania as Angelina
- Ennio Girolami as Alvaro
- Renato Baldini as Father
- Franca Marzi as Mother
- Miranda Campa
