= The Assassin (1961 film) =

1961 Italian–French film

- Directed by: Elio Petri
- Screenplay by: Tonino Guerra; Elio Petri; Pasquale Festa Campanile; Massimo Franciosa
- Story by: Tonino Guerra; Elio Petri
- Produced by: Franco Cristaldi
- Starring: Marcello Mastroianni; Cristina Gajoni; Micheline Presle; Salvo Randone; Andrea Cecchi; Giovanna Gagliardo; Max Cartier; Toni Ucci; Paolo Panelli
- Cinematography: Carlo Di Palma
- Edited by: Ruggero Mastroianni
- Music by: Piero Piccioni
- Production companies: Titanus; Vides Cinematografica; Société Générale de Cinématographie
- Distributed by: Titanus (Italy)
- Release dates: 1 April 1961 (Italy); July 1964 (France)
- Running time: 106 minutes
- Country: Italy
- Language: Italian

The Assassin (Italian: L'assassino) is a 1961 Italian-French crime drama film directed by Elio Petri starring Marcello Mastroianni. It was Petri's feature film debut as a director.

== Plot ==
Antiques dealer Alfredo returns to his exclusive apartment in Rome in the early morning hours. When his fiancée Nicoletta rings him up on the phone, he pretends that he had spent the whole night at home. Shortly after, the police arrive and arrest Alfredo, as his former mistress Adalgisa, with whom he had spent the previous night, has been found murdered in her hotel at the seaside. Also, Nicoletta has suddenly disappeared. While Alfredo is in custody, the police research his past and uncover an egotistical, ruthless careerist who uses the people around him to climb the social ladder at any cost, selling fake antiques, having his mistress pay for his expenses and dropping her at the prospect of marrying Nicoletta, the daughter of a rich industrialist. When Nicoletta shows up again and the true murderer is convicted, Alfredo is released. Showing remorse for his past behaviour at first, Alfredo soon returns to his previous ways.

== Cast ==
- Marcello Mastroianni as Alfredo Martelli
- Micheline Presle as Adalgisa de Matteis
- Cristina Gajoni as Nicoletta Nogara
- Salvo Randone as Commissario Palumbo
- Andrea Checchi as Morello, Adalgisa's husband
- Francesco Grandjacquet as the old gentleman
- Marco Mariani as Commissario Margiotta
- Franco Ressel as Doctor Francesconi
- Mac Ronay as the suicide
- Toni Ucci as Toni
- Max Cartier as Bruno
- Bruno Scipioni
- Giovanna Gagliardo as Rosetta
- Liana Ferri
- Carlo Egidi as the friend of Alfredo
- Eugenio Maggi
- Ubaldo Micacchi
- Silvio Bastianelli
- Paolo Panelli as Paolo

== Release ==
The Assassin was released in Italy on 1 April 1961, distributed by Titanus. It was shown in competition at the 11th Berlin International Film Festival June–July the same year and released in France in July 1964.

== Legacy ==
The film was restored in 2011 by the Cineteca di Bologna. The restored version was screened at the same year's 64th Cannes Film Festival in the "Cannes Classics" section.

== Awards ==
- Nastro d'argento for Best Supporting Actor Salvo Randone
