= Colt in the Hand of the Devil =

1967 Spaghetti Western film

- Directed by: Sergio Bergonzelli
- Written by: Sergio Bergonzelli; Ambrogio Molteni
- Produced by: Cineriz
- Cinematography: Aldo Greci
- Music by: Gian Piero Reverberi
- Release date: 1967
- Country: Italy
- Language: Italian

Colt in the Hand of the Devil (Italian: Una colt in pugno al diavolo, also known as Devil Was an Angel and An Angel with a Gun Is a Devil) is a 1967 Italian Spaghetti Western film written and directed by Sergio Bergonzelli. The theme song "The Devil Was an Angel" is performed by Mino Reitano. It was shot in Sardinia.

== Cast ==
- Bob Henry as Pat Scotty
- Marisa Solinas as Maya
- George Wang as El Condor/Capataz
- Lucretia Love as Jane
- Gerardo Rossi as Tenente Dick Carson
- Luciano Catenacci as El Loco
- Luciano Benetti as Cpt. McDonald
