= Sergio Bergonzelli =

Italian actor, film director and screenwriter

- Born: 25 August 1924; Alba, Italy
- Died: 24 September 2002 (aged 78); Rome, Italy
- Other name: Siro Carme
- Occupations: Director; Screenwriter

Sergio Bergonzelli (25 August 1924 – 24 September 2002) was an Italian director, screenwriter, producer and actor.

== Biography ==
Born in Alba, Cuneo, Bergonzelli graduated in philosophy, then he started working as an actor with the stage name Siro Carme. After being assistant and second unit director in a number of genre films, in 1960 he made his debut as director and screenwriter with Seven in the Sun. Also a film producer, Bergonzelli was the first to produce Spaghetti Western films entirely shot in Italy. In the 1970s he specialized in the erotic genre.

A graduate in philosophy, Sergio Bergonzelli made his debut as an actor in 1952, initially using the pseudonym Siro Carme. This year marks the release of no less than four films:La storia del fornaretto di Venezia directed by Giacinto Solito, a historical film; The Blind Woman of Sorrento (1953 film) directed by Giacomo Gentilomo, director of this reinterpretation of the famous novel by writer Francesco Mastriani; and finally I, Hamlet, a comedy by Giorgio Simonelli described by critics as "a rather feeble Shakespearean parody of dubious taste" and finally the same year with Pietro Germi's The Bandit of Tacca Del Lupo.

The year 1953 marked an intensification of Bergonzelli's acting career with the release of 6 films, namely Terra straniera, a drama film by Sergio Corbucci, Prima di sera, a comedy by Piero Tellini, It's Never Too Late (1953 film) allegorical film by Filippo Walter Ratti, Passione (film 1953), dramatic film by Max Calandri, La figlia del reggimento, cheerful comedy directed by Tullio Covaz, Géza von Bolváry, and Cristo è passato sull'aia, drama by Oreste Palella.

1954 opened with her participation in the drama film The King's Prisoner (1954 film), an Italian-French collaboration by Giorgio Venturini and Richard Pottier, the same year she appeared in another film entitled Farewell, My Beautiful Lady! by Fernando Cerchio.

After a two-year absence from motion pictures we see him again in 1957 with his last two films as an actor,The Most Wonderful Moment directed by Luciano Emmer where he plays the role of Mr. Mancini, and The Violent Patriot a historical film by Sergio Grieco.

== Director and screenwriter ==
1957 marked the final end of his acting activities, but it opened the door to Bergonzelli's directing career; in fact, in 1960 he made his first film as both director and screenwriter (a role he would play in many other productions) with the film The Adventurers of the Tropicsref.

In 1964 Bergonzelli signed another film,The Last Gun, a western starring Ketty Carver, described by critics as the first Italian-style western, predating even Sergio Leone's masterpiece A Fistful of Dollars.

In 1965 he was again director and screenwriter (participation in the screenplay by Bitto Albertini) with A Stranger in Sacramento, a western described by critics as having no particular merit. Also in the same year, the director-actor produced another film, again signing the screenplay, and again with Bitto Albertini, M.M.M.83, completely changing genres. A peculiarity of Sergio Bergonzelli is precisely the great variation of genres, both as an actor and as a director.

In 1966 he returned to the western genre with the making of El Cisco, starring William Berger (actor), again Bergonzelli personally handled the screenplay. In the period between 1965 and 1975 the film world will see a great spread of the western genre, Bergonzelli does not escape the trend and signs one more western film: Colt in the Hand of the Devil.

1968 marked with Silvia and Love Bergonzelli's debut with the genre that would accompany him for almost the rest of his career, the erotic. The same year he produced another film, also erotic in a pseudo-documentary cut: The 10 Wonders of Love.

In 1969 he made the adventure film I disperati di Cuba, the following year instead he signed a mediocre giallo-erotic film entitled In the Folds of the Flesh from this time on, until 1990, Bergonzelli would produce only erotic films.

In 1971 the drama film (with many erotic scenes) Io Cristiana student of scandals is signed and scripted by Sergio, the following year he stars in the screenplay of a western that is found by critics to be monotonous, Up Your Hands Corpse! You are under arrest.

n 1973 he again made a b-movie with an erotic background this time interspersed with religious themes, unscrupulous in its juxtaposition of themes but at the same time moralistic, Christian Nun Unholy. After the making of this film Bergonzelli left the scene for about two years, returning in 1975 with the erotic comedy La cognatina. In 1976 he made the erotic film Taxi Love, service for a lady[28]. Thus resumed Bergonzelli's career, directing La sposina[29], and Il compromesso... erotico the same year. His last film is 1990's Malizia oggi where Pornographic film actor also appears as an actress.

== Selected filmography ==
Director

- Seven in the Sun (1960)*
- The Last Gun (1964)
- Stranger in Sacramento (1965)*
- The Sea Pirate (1966)
- M.M.M. 83 (1966)*
- Colt in the Hand of the Devil (1967)*
- In the Folds of the Flesh (1970)
- Blood Delirium (N/A)*
- '*' denotes he wrote the screenplay

Actor

- Messalina (1951)
- The Bandit of Tacca Del Lupo (1952)
- La storia del fornaretto di Venezia (1952)
- I, Hamlet (1952) – fencing master
- The Blind Woman of Sorrento (1953) – the young conspirator
- It's Never Too Late (1953)
- Una donna prega (1953)
- The Daughter of the Regiment (1953)
- Passione (1953)
- Cristo è passato sull'aia (1953)
- Terra straniera (1954)
- Gran varietà (1954)
- The King's Prisoner (1954)
- Farewell, My Beautiful Lady (1954) – the student who gives a speech (uncredited)
- The Violent Patriot (1956)
- The Most Wonderful Moment (1957) – Mr. Mancini
- Et la tendresse?... Bordel! (1979)
- Pasiones desenfrenadas (1981)
- Tentazione (1988) (uncredited)
- Sick-o-pathics (1955) – neighbour #1 (segment "The Poor, The Flesh & The Bag") (final film role)
