= The Road a Year Long =

1958 film directed by Giuseppe De Santis

- Italian release poster
- Directed by: Giuseppe De Santis
- Written by: Giuseppe De Santis
- Starring: Silvana Pampanini
- Cinematography: Marco Scarpelli
- Edited by: Boris Tešija
- Music by: Vladimir Kraus-Rajterić
- Release date: 12 July 1958
- Running time: 162 minutes
- Countries: Italy; Yugoslavia
- Language: Italian

The Road a Year Long (Italian: La strada lunga un anno, Serbo-Croatian: Cesta duga godinu dana) is a 1958 film directed by Giuseppe De Santis. A Yugoslavian-Italian co-production, it was Yugoslavia's first ever submission for the Academy Award for Best Foreign Language Film and was nominated for the award at the 31st Academy Awards in April 1959. It won the Golden Globe Award for Best Foreign Language Film. For his performance Massimo Girotti was awarded best actor at the San Francisco International Film Festival.

== Plot ==
Emil Kozma (Bert Sotlar), a peasant from an isolated mountain village, starts building a road to a nearby town. Over time, other villagers join the endeavor, believing the construction is state-sponsored. Ultimately, they discover Kozma started the works on his own initiative and without a permit, but it is already too late to stop the project...

== Cast ==
- Silvana Pampanini as Giuseppina Pancrazi
- Eleonora Rossi Drago as Susanna
- Massimo Girotti as Chiacchiera (Naklapalo)
- Bert Sotlar as Guglielmo Cosma (Emil Kozma)
- Ivica Pajer as Lorenco
- Milivoje Živanović as Davide
- Gordana Miletić as Angela
- Nikša Stefanini as David
- Hermina Pipinić as Agneza
- Lia Rho-Barbieri as Roza
- Antun Vrdoljak as Bernard

== See also ==
- List of submissions to the 31st Academy Awards for Best Foreign Language Film
- List of Yugoslav submissions for the Academy Award for Best Foreign Language Film
