= In the Folds of the Flesh =

- Directed by: Sergio Bergonzelli
- Written by: Fabio De Agostini; Sergio Bergonzelli
- Story by: Mario Caiano
- Produced by: Sergio Bergonzelli
- Starring: Eleonora Rossi Drago; Anna Maria Pierangeli
- Cinematography: Mario Pacheco
- Edited by: Donatella Baglivo
- Music by: Jesus Villa Rojo
- Production companies: Talia Films; M.G.B. Cinematografica
- Release date: 2 May 1970
- Running time: 88 minutes
- Countries: Italy; Spain
- Language: Italian

In the Folds of the Flesh (Italian: Nelle pieghe della carne) is a 1970 Italian / Spanish giallo film produced and directed by Sergio Bergonzelli. The screenplay was co-written by Fabio De Agostini and Bergonzelli, from a story outline by Mario Caiano. Ferdinando Merighi and Juan Vilches were the assistant directors.

It starred Eleonora Rossi Drago and Anna Maria Pierangeli. It was released in Spain as Las endemoniadas ("The Possessed") and years later on French video as La Folle (The Madness).

== Plot ==
An escaped convict named Pascal Gorriot happens to witness an attractive woman named Lucille disposing of her second husband Andre's corpse.

Thirteen years later, Andre's cousin shows up at Lucille's villa and he is stabbed to death by Andre's daughter (Falaise) who is still living there. Lucille's son kills the visiting cousin's pet dog who arrived with him. Soon after, another friend of the family moves into the villa and seduces the criminally insane Falaise, who decapitates him afterwards.

The escaped convict returns to the scene, down on his luck, and decides to blackmail Lucille for murdering her husband years earlier. He winds up in an acid bath.

The police investigate the chain of murders going on at the villa. The film even has a brief flashback to a WW2 Nazi death camp, scenes from which were used exploitatively in the sleeve design of the British Redemption video release.

== Cast ==
- Eleonora Rossi Drago - Lucille
- Anna Maria Pierangeli - Ester (Fake Falaise Gardere)
- Emilio Gutiérrez Caba - Colin
- Fernando Sancho - Pascal Gorriot
- Victor Alcazar - Alex Bourdelaine
- Maria Rosa Sclauzero - Falaise Gardere
- Alfredo Mayo - police inspector
- Giancarlo Sisti - Andre
- Luciano Lorcas Catenacci - Antoine
- Gaetano Imbro
- Bruno Ciangola - Michel

== Critical reception ==
Adrian Luther Smith commented "The film has enough aberrant behavior and neuroses to keep a conference of psychologists busy for a week...a ridiculous overwrought trash masterpiece.....the film even manages to drag in Etruscan skeletons, squawking vultures and flashbacks to a Nazi death camp.....the multiple beheadings are painfully unconvincing.". He added "The plot is so convoluted and bizarre, it defies serious explanation."

== Release ==
The only uncut VHS release of this film was the letterboxed British Redemption video which ran 88 minutes, and had a BBFC 18 Certificate. Severin Films released what they claim is an uncut "87-minute" print on DVD in 2008, "fully restored from the Italian vault elements". The film was released on video in Argentina as Mansion Sangriamente, in France as La Folle, and in Greece as Felicity.
