= Giuseppe De Santis =

Italian film director (1917–1997)

Giuseppe de Santis
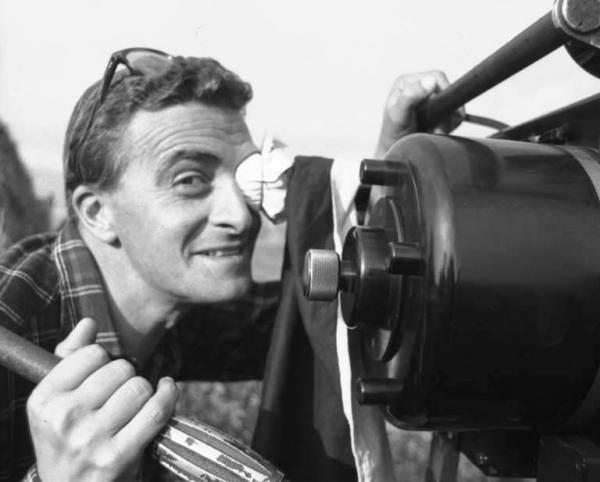
- on a set break
- Born: 11 February 1917; Fondi, Lazio, Italy
- Died: 16 May 1997 (aged 80)
- Years active: 1940–1995
- Spouse: Gordana Miletic

Giuseppe De Santis (11 February 1917 – 16 May 1997) was an Italian film director. One of the most idealistic neorealist filmmakers of the 1940s and '50s, he wrote and directed films punctuated by ardent cries for social reform.

He was the brother of Italian cinematographer Pasqualino De Santis. His wife was Gordana Miletic (native spelling: Miletić), a Yugoslav actress and former ballet dancer.

== Biography ==
De Santis was born in Fondi, Lazio. He was a member of the Italian Communist Party (PCI) and fought with the anti-German Resistance in Rome during World War II.

He was first a student of philosophy and literature before entering Rome's Centro Sperimentale di Cinematografia. While working as a journalist for Cinema magazine, De Santis became, under the influence of Cesare Zavattini, a major proponent of the early neorealist filmmakers who were trying to make films that mirrored the simple and tragic realities of proletarian life using location shooting and nonprofessional actors.

In 1942, De Santis collaborated on the script for Ossessione, Luchino Visconti's debut film, which is usually considered one of the first neo-realist films.

While still working for Cinema magazine, he increasingly worked as a screenwriter and assistant director until 1947 when he made his own directorial debut with Caccia Tragica (Tragic Hunt). Like the two films to follow, it was a sincere call for better living conditions for the Italian working class and agrarian workers. Issues of corruption, the black market, collaboration with the Germans, and treatment of ex-soldiers were also introduced in the film.

His third film Bitter Rice (1949), the story of a young woman working in the rice fields who must choose between two socially disparate suitors, made a star of Silvana Mangano and was a landmark of the new cinematic style. It also earned De Santis an Academy Award nomination for Best Original Story.

By the early 1950s, the neorealist movement was falling out of favour with critics and audiences. New filmmakers began using dramatic stories that centered on relationships and de Santis also altered his focus.

In 1952 he filmed Roma ore 11 (Rome 11 o'clock), the first version of the real tragic accident that Augusto Genina remade in 1953 as Three Forbidden Stories.

In 1959 he won a Golden Globe with La strada lunga un anno; the film, produced in Yugoslavia, had a nomination for the Oscar as Best Foreign Language Film.

In 1979 he was a member of the jury at the 11th Moscow International Film Festival. In 1985 he was a member of the jury at the 14th Moscow International Film Festival.

De Santis died in 1997 at the age of 80, in Rome, following a heart attack, and a day of mourning was declared in Italy. A part of his archives have been donated to the Reynolds Library of Wake Forest University.

Also, his wife and friends have established a Foundation named after him.

== Filmography ==
Year	Title	Director	Writer
1946	Desire	No	Yes
1946	The Sun Still Rises	No	Yes
1947	Tragic Hunt	Yes	Yes
1949	Bitter Rice	Yes	Yes
1950	No Peace Under the Olive Tree	Yes	Yes
1952	Rome 11:00	Yes	Yes
1953	A Husband for Anna	Yes	Yes
1954	Days of Love	Yes	Yes
1956	The Wolves	Yes	Yes
1957	Engaged to Death	No	Yes
1958	The Road a Year Long	Yes	Yes
1960	La garçonnière	Yes	Yes
1964	Attack and Retreat	Yes	Yes
1972	Un apprezzato professionista di sicuro avvenire	Yes	Yes
