= Daniela Scalia =

Italian sports journalist

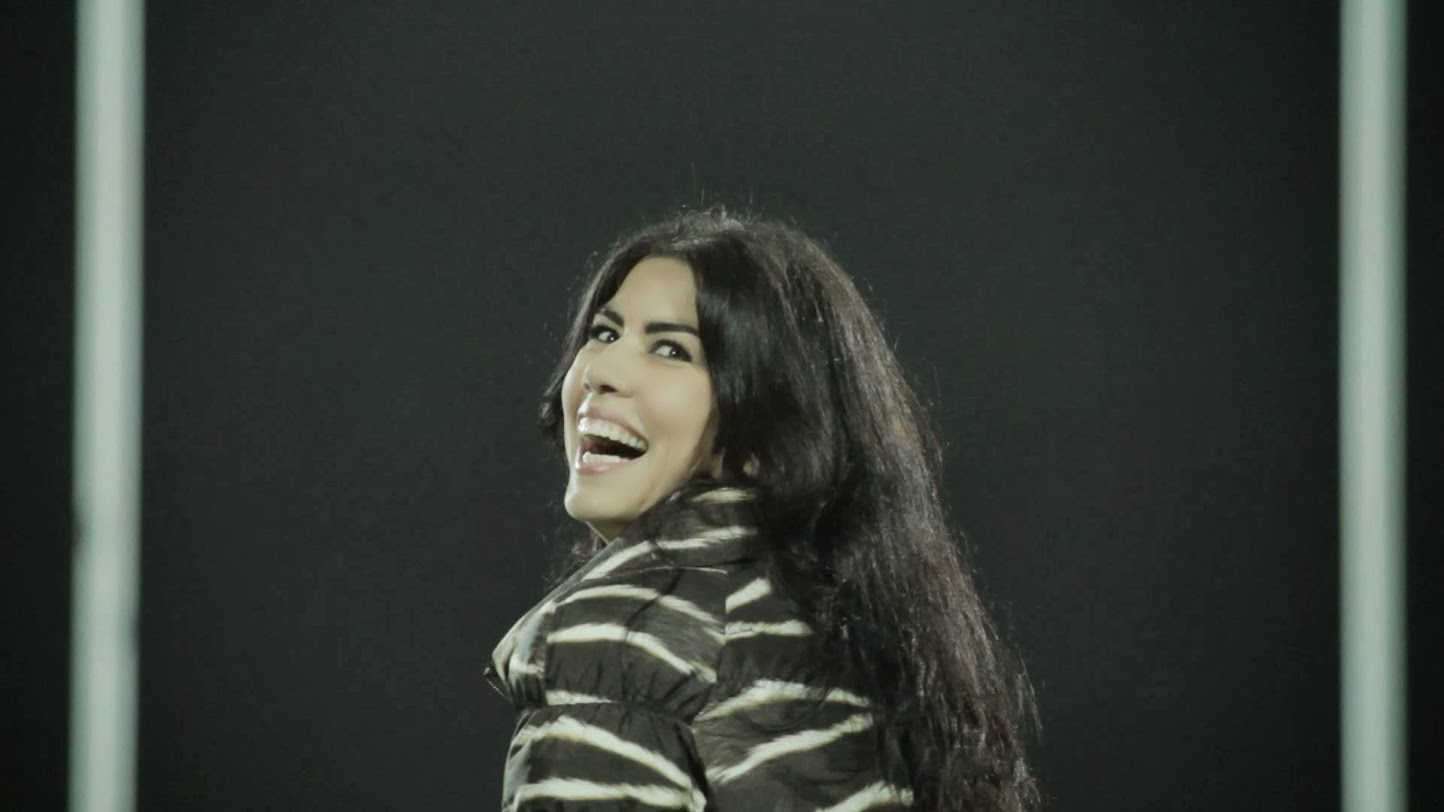
- Born: 9 November 1975 (age 50); Verona, Italy
- Occupations: Writer, producer, director, actress, journalist
- Television: Sport Crime
- Website: sportcrime.com

Daniela Scalia (born 9 November 1975 in Verona) is an Italian anchorwoman, sports journalist and multi-sport athlete. She is the producer, director and actress for the TV series Sport Crime.

== Television ==
In 2004 she moved to Sportitalia being the first female anchor on the national TV, covering the news and Soccer programmes, also for the sister company Eurosport.

In 2007 she started anchoring the International Rugby Board (IRB)'s official magazine Total Rugby, with Luca Tramontin.

Correspondent at the 2007 World Cup for Si Rugby, the magazine she wrote and presented with Luca Tramontin, featuring also Australian Football, Rugby League and other less known codes.

2008 to 2010 Scalia tied her public image to the daily live night show Prima Ora.

In 2011 she wrote and hosted with Luca Tramontin a show called the Oval Bin.

In 2013 she anchored the Ice Hockey magazine ESP Hockey on Espansione TV with her long term TV partner Luca Tramontin.

In 2017 FUNalysis: Scalia and Tramontin created, produced and anchored on Sportitalia a show about the unbelievable aspects of the most remote sports, enforcing the fun-factor.

== Sport Crime ==
She stars in the international TV series Sport Crime, which is the first procedural TV series based on different sports investigations. It locates each episode on a different place and sport. It is distributed on Prime Video US and Prime Video UK.

It features real sports action in a classic investigation plot, with an international cast of actors.

In 2022, after the launch at the Mostra del Cinema di Venezia, the 1st season is on Chili in Italy.

== Movies ==
In 2016 Scalia wrote and starred with Tramontin in the TV movie The Legacy Run, featuring Nino Castelnuovo. The film, shot in Switzerland and Croatia, had its debut on 4 December 2016, on Swiss national television.

== Difesa&Attacco ==
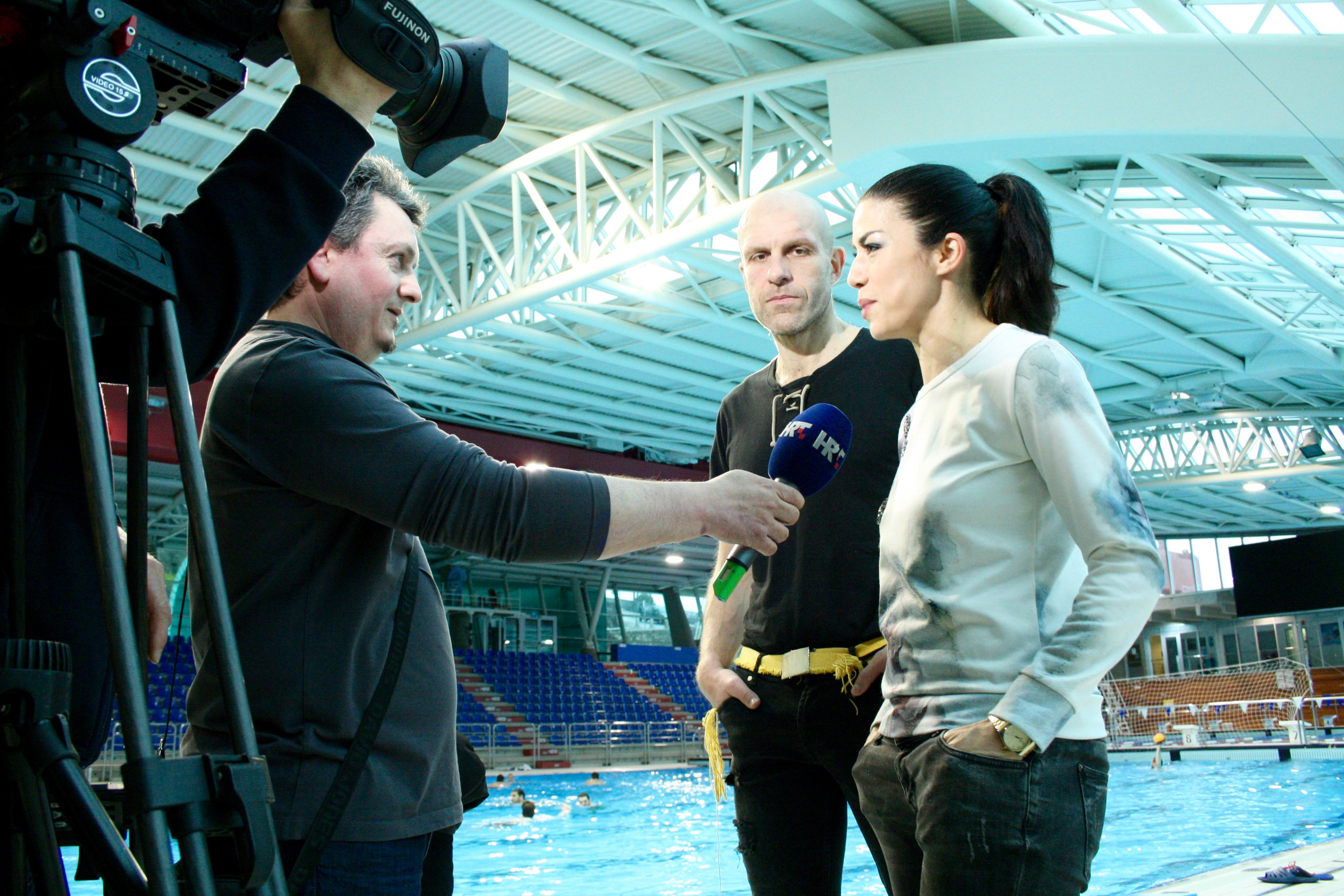
Scalia and Luca Tramontin during 2016 interview

Scalia wrote, directed and hosted the TV program "Difesa&Attacco" (aired on Sportitalia on 24 April 2024).

The format is dedicated to women's physical protection, with practical advice aimed to prevent violence.

She often displays it in theaters and other venues to increase debate on the matter.

== Books ==
Scalia cured and co-wrote In onda con 3 dita, a book revealing shocking and humorous details of Luca's life.

== Magazines ==
Since January 2020 she is columnist of Sportdipiù.

== Athlete ==
Australian football

In 2009 Scalia started Australian football and earned an International cap playing with Italy against Ireland in the 2010 EU Cup.

GAA

- 2014: Scalia represented Italy in the Gaelic Football national team debut against France in Toulouse.
- 2016: included in the Venetian Lionesses Ladies Team roster.

Cricket

- 2012: Scalia started playing with Milan Kingsgrove in 2012.
- 2015: transferred to Olimpia Casteller Cricket Club winning Coppa Italia.
- August 2015: represented Italy in the Ireland and Jersey tour winning the European tournament.
- 2018: capped in the All Stars Tournament at the Royal Brussels Cricket Club with MCC Ladies Ambassadors.
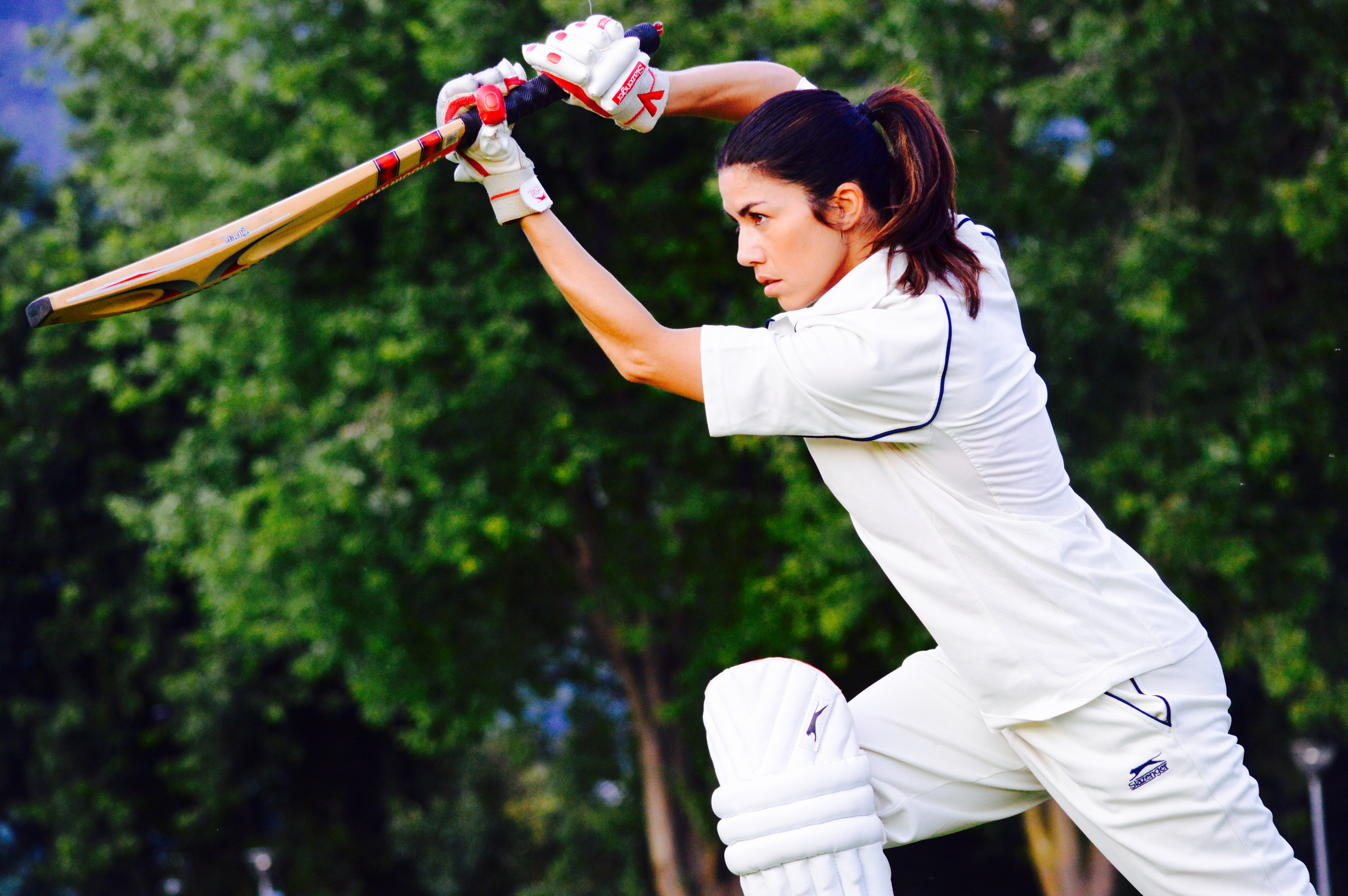
  Scalia posing for a cricket scene

Rugby

In 2015 she joined ASD Rugby Casale making her debut in the Italian Serie A on April 12 in Turin.

Soccer

2018–2019: hired as professional trainer for FC Lugano with Luca Tramontin.

Based on a custom protocol called "Rugball", the footballers experienced techniques and drills partly custom created and partly from rugby. An improvement of neuromotor, technical and social relational skills has been reported and praised by the president Leonid Novoselskyi and coaches of the professional team.

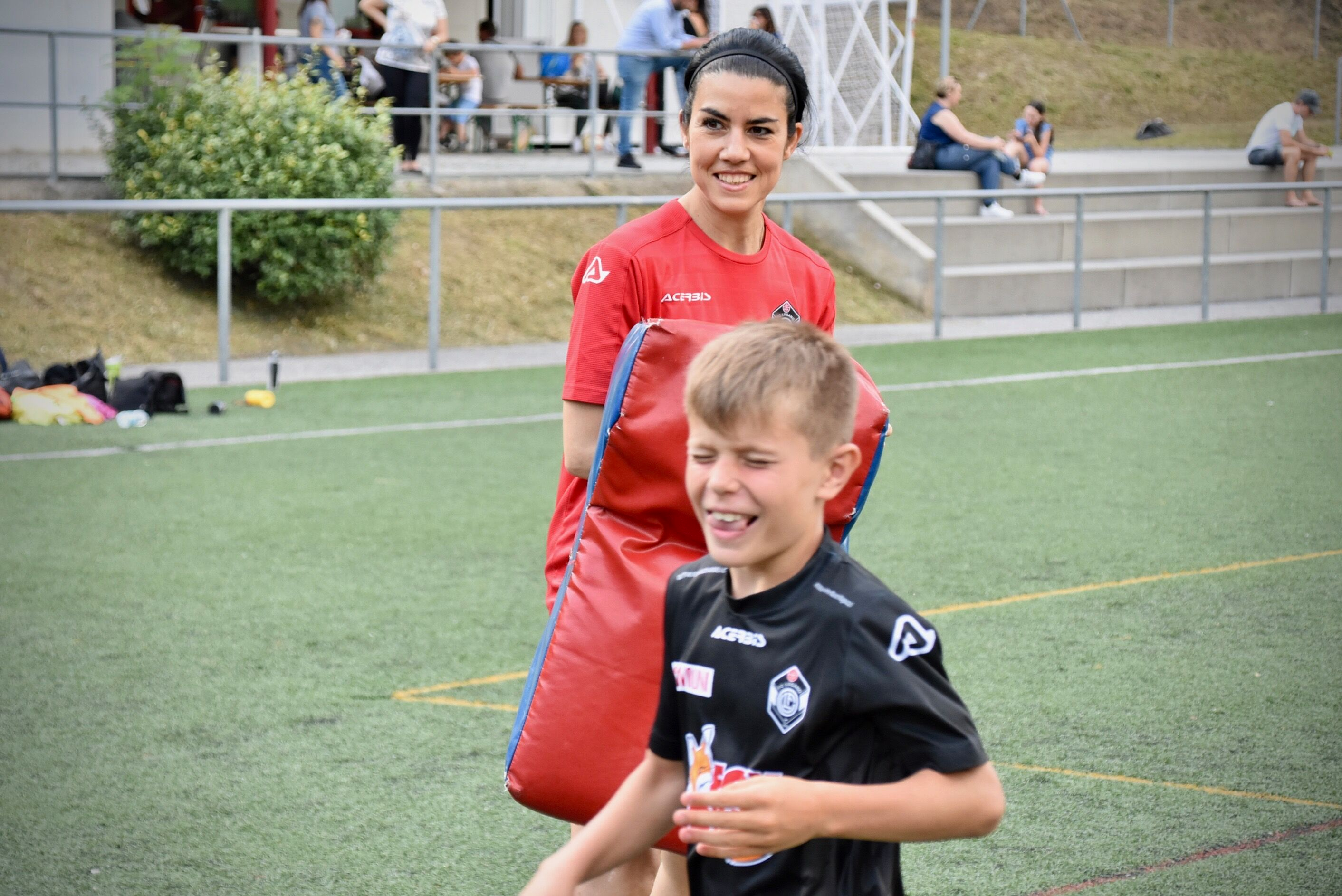
Scalia teaching rugby techniques to a youth football group (2019)

Orules and other disabled sports

Scalia helped her colleague Tramontin in coaching and training disabled people in a new full contact oval ball formula. It has been documented on TV and media in order to expand the code.

Scalia is close to any form of team sport for disabled people, both organizing or trying to practice herself.

== Personal life ==
Scalia is a widow.

== Filmography ==
=== Film ===
| Year | Title | Role | Notes |
|---|---|---|---|
| 2016 | The Legacy Run | Dani | |

=== Television ===
| Year | Title | Role | Notes |
|---|---|---|---|
| 2022 | Sport Crime | Daniela Goblin | 6 episodes Also co-creator, writer, producer and director |
