= Five Man Army =

Five Man Army may refer to:

- The Five Man Army (Italian: Un esercito di cinque uomini), a 1969 Spaghetti Western film
- "Five Man Army" (song), from the 1991 album Blue Lines by Massive Attack
