= The Legacy Run =

The Legacy Run is a procedural Sport-Movie produced in Switzerland and Croatia in 2016, featuring sport-cast Daniela Scalia and Luca Tramontin, and Italian Cannes winner Nino Castelnuovo.

== Plot ==
Marco Casale is a famous cross country runner who got stale and bored, he is close to give up in the full of his best years. His coach plan is to use the breathtaking landscape of northern Croatia's coast and hills and Dabs (Luca Tramontin) unusual training approach to perk Marco up to the next crucial race in IOWA. The runner feels obsessed by a frightening and dark figure who seems to follow him during his picturesque running sessions in the cliffs and Marinas of Opatija, Rijeka and Volosko. After a highly unexpected turn of events Dani (Daniela Scalia) proposes Dabs to start an agency to protect sports and investigate when it is in danger of some kind.

== Cast ==
- Daniela Scalia as Dani
- Nino Castelnuovo as Kenny Butler
- Xena Zupanic as Janica
- Luca Tramontin as Dabs
- Toussaint Mavakala as Jaden
- Marco Rosso as Marco Casale
- Marco Baron as Hockey coach/himself
- Flavien Conne as Hockey player/himself
- Paolo Della Bella as Hockey goaltender/himself
- Stefania Bianchini as Boxing champion/herself
- Ivan Asic as Waterpolo Coach/himself
- Alessio D'Ambrosio as Skater/himself
- Grigorios Barkonikos as Sports Analyst/Himself
- Romolo Pignone as himself

Former rugby player and analyst Luca Tramontin originally featured only as a writer, but was eventually convinced by director Massimiliano Mazza and co-writer Daniela Scalia to enact the “Dabs” character that was strongly based on him. Dabs-Tramontin evolved to be the main figure, his personal trade marks, gestures and humor bits have been highlighted since then.

The sixteen year old Nico Tramontin (Luca's son and Hockey Lugano defender) contributed in actor scouting and artistic direction for the youngest characters of the movie.

== Production ==
=== Writing ===
“The Legacy Run” like the TV Series “Sport Crime” is a fully fictional work, despite that, Scalia and Tramontin employed an unprecedented approach in writing the screenplay by building the film's plot around a case they witnessed, and asking the sportsman to act themselves nearly in full. This pattern is thought to be the blueprint for the TV Series Sport Crime in which they make ample use of the story they lived as athletes, commentators and anchors for many international TV networks.

=== Filming ===
Shooting began in Ticino (Switzerland) in February 2016 and ended in Rijeka (Croatia) in March. Mazza's direction purposely mixes different styles, from the most orthodox French oriented long sequence shot and reaction shots to the most sporty quick movement in order to appeal both fiction and sport audiences.

== Broadcast ==
December 4, 2016, "The Legacy Run" had its world premier at Swiss national tv RSI reaching share numbers close to the historic Sunday Sport Show "La Domenica Sportiva".
