= The Bloodstained Lawn =

- Directed by: Riccardo Ghione
- Screenplay by: Riccardo Ghione
- Story by: Riccardo Ghione
- Produced by: Alfredo Chetta; Aldo Pascucci
- Starring: Marina Malfatti; Enzo Tarascio; Daniela Caroli
- Cinematography: Romolo Garroni
- Edited by: Cleofe Conversi
- Music by: Teo Usuelli
- Production company: Canguro Cinematografica
- Distributed by: Drago Film
- Release date: 2 March 1973 (Italy)
- Running time: 90 minutes
- Country: Italy
- Box office: ₤56.364 million

The Bloodstained Lawn (Italian: Il prato macchiato di rosso, lit. 'The red-stained lawn') is a 1973 Italian film directed by Riccardo Ghione.

In the film, two hippies are offered hospitality in a villa, unaware that their host is after their blood. The host uses a robot to drain blood from humans, and placing them into wine bottles from his winery.

== Plot ==
Emilia-Romagna, Italy, early 1970s. A UNESCO agent discovers that blood is contained in a bottle of wine produced by a well-known Italian winery. Meanwhile, Alfiero picks up several people discarded by society — a prostitute, a gypsy girl, a drunkard, and two hippie hitchhikers — and delivers them to the mansion of Dr. Antonio Genovese and his wife. The guests note the presence of a strange mechanical robot. One by one the guests disappear. Finally the hitchhikers make it to the mansion's basement, where they witness the robot draining the prostitute of her blood. Genovese's wife is revealed as the mastermind: Genovese, at his wife's insistence, has created a robot to suck the blood from the bodies of "worthless" humans; they package the blood in wine bottles and export it for profit to "wherever there are wars, or injured people."

The UNESCO agent, having followed clues from the winery, arrives to search the mansion. He shoots Alfiero; Genovese's wife is killed by the robot; and the hitchhikers are rescued.

== Cast ==
- Marina Malfatti as Nina Genovese
- Enzo Tarascio as Dr. Antonio Genovese
- Daniela Caroli and Georg Willing as The Hitchhikers
- Claudio Biava as Alfiero
- Barbara Marzano as The Gypsy
- Dominique Boschero as The Prostitute
- Lucio Dalla as The Drunkard
- Nino Castelnuovo as The UNESCO Agent

== Style ==
Italian film critic and historian Roberto Curti described the film as mixing elements from the gothic genre, the thriller and a little bit of science fiction.

== Production ==
Shortly after the release of director Riccardo Ghione's previous film A cuore freddo, Ghione was working on his next film titled Vampiro 2000 which was shot in the village of Fiorenzuola d'Arda. Ghione announced a different film during this period, an adaptation of Il male oscuro, a novel by Giuseppe Berto, which never came to fruition. Vampiro 2000 eventually became retitled as Il pratto macchiato di rosso.

== Release ==
Il pratto macchiato di rosso was distributed theatrically in Italy by Drago Film and had its premiere on 2 March 1973 in Fiorenzuola d'Arda. The film grossed a total of 56,364,000 Italian lire domestically on its initial release. According to Curti, after the film's release it vanished into obscurity to only be brought back to attention on a home video release around 2017.

== Reception ==
Curti declared that Il prato macchiato di rosso retained a small level of notoriety in the village of Fiorenzuola where the memory of the shooting of the film remained vivid still in 2018.

== See also ==
- List of Italian films of 1973

== Footnotes ==
=== References ===
- Curti, Roberto (2017). Italian Gothic Horror Films, 1970–1979. McFarland. ISBN 978-1476629605.
- Curti, Roberto (2018). Mavericks of Italian Cinema: Eight Unorthodox Filmmakers, 1940s–2000s. McFarland. ISBN 978-1-4766-7242-7.
