= Flavien Conne =

Swiss ice hockey player (born 1980)

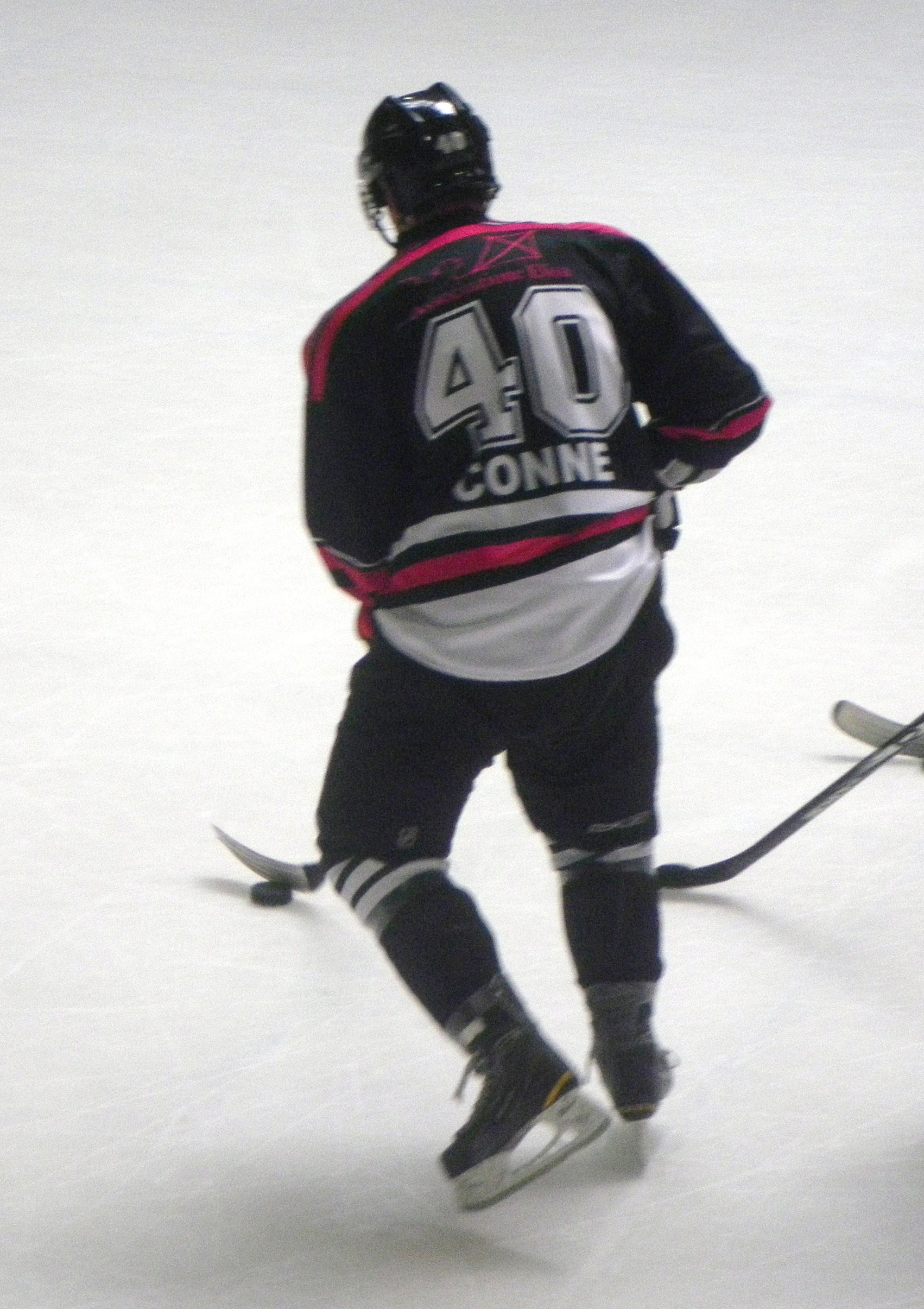
- Born: 1 April 1980 (age 46) Puidoux, Switzerland
- Height: 5 ft 10 in (178 cm)
- Weight: 179 lb (81 kg; 12 st 11 lb)
- Position: Centre
- Shot: Left
- Played for: HC Ambrì-Piotta; HC Fribourg-Gottéron; HC Lugano
- National team: Switzerland
- NHL draft: 250th overall, 2000; Los Angeles Kings
- Playing career: 1996–2014

Flavien Conne (born 1 April 1980) is a Swiss former professional ice hockey player. He played over 600 games in the Swiss National League A (NLA). He was selected by the Los Angeles Kings in the 8th (250th overall) of the 2000 NHL entry draft.

Conne competed at both the 2002 and 2006 Winter Olympics with the Switzerland men's national ice hockey team.

== Film work ==
February 2016 Conne appeared as himself in an ice-hockey scene of the TV movie The Legacy Run.

== Career statistics ==
=== Regular season and playoffs ===
			Regular season					Playoffs
Season	Team	League	GP	G	A	Pts	PIM	GP	G	A	Pts	PIM
1996–97	Genève–Servette HC	SUI.2	30	9	8	17	8	—	—	—	—	—
1997–98	Genève–Servette HC	SUI U20	9	11	6	17	12	—	—	—	—	—
1997–98	Genève–Servette HC	SUI.2	37	15	12	27	57	—	—	—	—	—
1997–98	HC Ambrì–Piotta	NDA	1	0	0	0	0	—	—	—	—	—
1998–99	HC Fribourg–Gottéron	SUI U20	1	1	1	2	2	—	—	—	—	—
1998–99	HC Fribourg–Gottéron	NDA	37	14	14	28	59	—	—	—	—	—
1999–2000	HC Fribourg–Gottéron	NLA	44	19	22	41	83	4	0	1	1	0
2000–01	HC Lugano	NLA	42	9	14	23	40	15	2	6	8	37
2001–02	HC Lugano	NLA	43	11	14	25	20	5	1	1	2	0
2002–03	HC Lugano	NLA	42	15	21	36	32	16	4	4	8	10
2003–04	HC Lugano	NLA	32	11	13	24	18	16	8	4	12	12
2004–05	HC Lugano	NLA	21	2	5	7	18	5	1	1	2	4
2005–06	HC Lugano	NLA	43	4	9	13	52	5	0	0	0	6
2006–07	HC Lugano	NLA	9	0	1	1	6	4	0	0	0	0
2007–08	HC Lugano	NLA	50	5	9	14	32	—	—	—	—	—
2008–09	HC Lugano	NLA	33	2	6	8	38	7	2	0	2	4
2009–10	HC Lugano	NLA	28	4	7	11	16	4	0	1	1	2
2010–11	HC Lugano	NLA	46	4	11	15	32	—	—	—	—	—
2011–12	HC Lugano	NLA	45	6	9	15	24	6	0	1	1	4
2012–13	HC Lugano	NLA	48	2	6	8	20	7	1	0	1	2
2013–14	HC Lugano	NLA	3	0	0	0	2	5	0	0	0	0
2015–16	HC Pregassona Red Fox	SUI.6	1	0	0	0	0	—	—	—	—	—
NDA/NLA totals			567	108	161	269	492	103	19	19	38	85

=== International ===
Year	Team	Event	GP	G	A	Pts	PIM
1997	Switzerland	EJC	6	2	1	3	0
1998	Switzerland	WJC	7	0	1	1	0
1998	Switzerland	EJC	6	2	2	4	10
1999	Switzerland	WJC	4	1	2	3	2
2000	Switzerland	WJC	7	4	3	7	10
2000	Switzerland	WC	7	1	0	1	6
2001	Switzerland	WC	6	2	0	2	4
2002	Switzerland	OG	1	0	0	0	0
2002	Switzerland	WC	6	0	0	0	4
2003	Switzerland	WC	7	1	0	1	6
2005	Switzerland	OGQ	3	0	3	3	2
2005	Switzerland	WC	7	0	0	0	0
2006	Switzerland	OG	6	1	0	1	6
Junior totals			30	9	9	18	22
Senior totals			43	5	3	8	28
