= The Five Man Army =

1969 Italian Western film set in Mexico

- US film poster
- Directed by: Don Taylor
- Screenplay by: Marc Richards; Dario Argento
- Produced by: Italo Zingarelli
- Starring: Peter Graves; James Daly; Bud Spencer; Nino Castelnuovo; Tetsuro Tamba
- Cinematography: Enzo Barboni
- Edited by: Sergio Montanari
- Music by: Ennio Morricone
- Production company: Tiger Film
- Distributed by: Delta (Italy); Metro-Goldwyn-Mayer (International)
- Release date: October 16, 1969
- Running time: 105 minutes
- Country: Italy
- Languages: Italian; English

The Five Man Army (Italian: Un esercito di 5 uomini) is a 1969 Italian Spaghetti Western film in which a group of five men are enlisted to rob a train of a gold shipment during the Mexican Revolution. Directed by Don Taylor, it featured a script by a young Dario Argento, later future maestro of the horror and thriller genre, and a score by Ennio Morricone. Argento also directed some sequences of the film without being credited.

== Plot ==
Mexican rebels hire the "Dutchman" to rob a train carrying $500,000 in gold on behalf of Victoriano Huerta to finance the Mexican Revolution. Dutchman then enlists four other men to assist him, promising to pay each of them a thousand dollars. They are Mesito, a strong man on the run for cattle rustling; Luis, a circus acrobat turned outlaw; Augustus, a former army officer and explosives specialist who had served in the same unit as Dutchman; and a samurai warrior (referred to only as Samurai), earning a living in a sideshow.

Immediately after they assemble, their first undertaking is to save the rebel leader who hired them from being executed. After rescuing him and causing a riot in the village, the five men are forced to flee, along with all the villagers, in order to prevent reprisals. Nevertheless, some soldiers still manage to find the Five and bring them to the local Army commandant. A Mexican woman slips Samurai a knife and the men manage to escape, killing the soldiers and dynamiting the fort's magazine. They are tracked by a large group of mounted pursuers and escape capture after coming upon a small group of rebels, who are there to cover the Five's escape. Though they know that they will be unable to stop the soldiers, the rebels are willing to sacrifice themselves for the Five in the cause of the revolution.

The train carrying the gold is heavily defended by a cannon, machine guns, and dozens of soldiers. The Dutchman's plan is to board the train and uncouple the car carrying the gold without stopping it. The difficult robbery succeeds, despite Samurai falling off the train and having to run across country after it, as well as Augustus dropping a key piece of equipment and having to improvise. When the Five return to their hideout, conflict arises amongst them. Luis, Augustus, Mesito, and Samurai had all assumed they were going to take the gold for themselves, while the Dutchman is set on keeping his promise to the rebels. He disarms the other four and explains to them that his motivation for supporting the revolution is because his wife had been executed by soldiers since other members of her family were rebels.

The Dutchman is about to leave with the gold, but he is stopped by the arrival of a mounted squad of soldiers. He therefore has to rearm the other four, who are able to ambush and quickly kill all of their opponents. Now armed again, Augustus, Mesito, and Samurai seem set on taking back the gold, but they are stopped at gunpoint by Luis, who has decided that he will join the Revolution too. At this point, hundreds of rebels arrive to collect the gold and treat the Five Man Army like heroes. Augustus, Mesito and Samurai start laughing and acquiesce in the logic of the situation.

== Cast ==
- Peter Graves as the Dutchman
- Bud Spencer as Mesito
- Nino Castelnuovo as Luis Dominguez
- James Daly as Captain Augustus Bennet
- Tetsuro Tamba as Samurai
- Claudio Gora as Manuel Esteban
- Daniela Giordano as Maria
- Annabella Andreoli as Perla
- Carlo Alighiero as General Gutiérrez
- Giacomo Rossi Stuart as Officer
- Marino Masé as Train Engineer
- Dan Sturkie as Carnival Barker
- Steffen Zacharias as Poker Player (uncredited)
- Don Taylor as Poker Player (uncredited)

== DVD ==
The Five Man Army was released to DVD by Warner Home Video on September 11, 2012, via the Warner Archive DVD-on-demand system available through Amazon.

== See also ==
- Adima Changala, a 1981 Indian remake
