= Luca Tramontin =

Italian television presenter

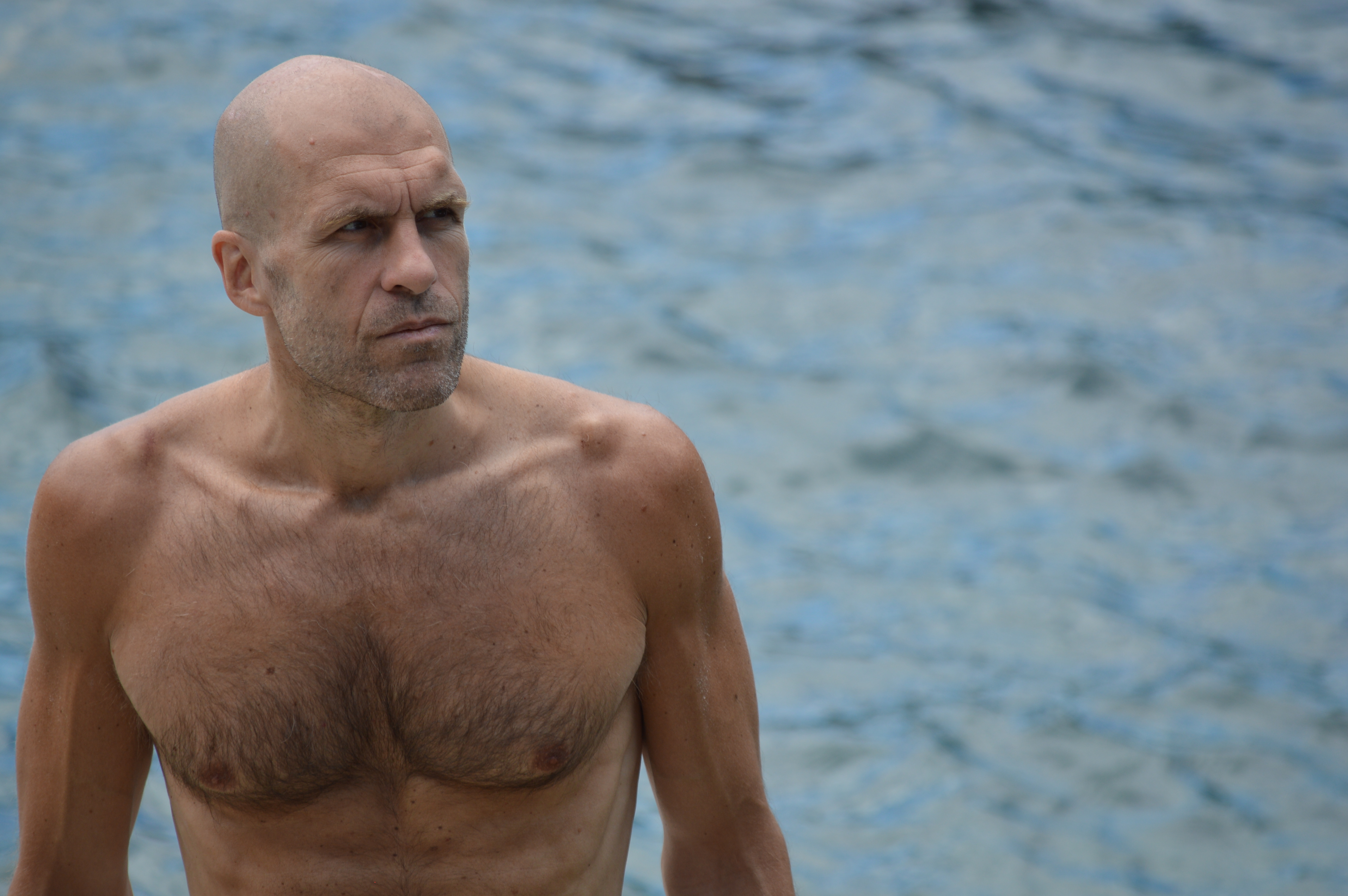

Personal information
- Nickname: Devil
- Nationality: Italian
- Born: 22 February 1966 (age 60) Belluno, Italy
- Occupation(s): Rugby player, television star
- Height: 199 cm (6 ft 6 in)

Sport
- Country: Italy
- Sport: Rugby
- Position: lock
- Updated on 10 November 2023

Luca Tramontin (born 22 February 1966) is an Italian former rugby union footballer, and a television sports personality. He is the author and protagonist of the television series Sport Crime that he created with Daniela Scalia. He has played for Italy, Switzerland, and Hungary. He has also played Australian rules football, Ice hockey, Rugby League and Gaelic football. He has appeared on Eurosport's programs, including Total Rugby.

== Television career ==
Tramontin was on television mostly as a guest, but in 1996, he began studying acting and television writing at the Antenna Cinema school. He worked a year at Canale 5, then at Telepiù-Sky as a writer and journalist for five years. Although still active in rugby, his television production work had yet to be related to his sport activities.

In 2004, Tramontin moved to the newly formed network SportItalia, which partnered with Eurosport. There, he provided commentary on rugby matches, with Pierpaolo Pedroni in the first year, and afterwards with Gianluca Veneziano. He anchored the International Rugby Board (IRB)'s official magazine program, Total Rugby, with Daniela Scalia. The show had been broadcast in over a hundred countries without any anchors, but Tramontin and Scalia changed the format making it into a "docu-talk".

Between 2004 and 2012, Tramontin commented for Eurosport. The topics featured include: Rugby League State of Origin, National Rugby League, Australian Football League, Cricket Champions League, Field Hockey Euro League, weightlifting, StrongMan, Gaelic Sports and the Spengler Cup ice hockey tournament, the last of which he considers one of the best sports events ever.

In 2006, Tramontin became a regular guest on the Swiss National TV RSI lunch-time talk show Mezzogiorno in punto as a "multifaceted talker of sports, music and life in general".[ Since 2007, he is the Rugby World Cup and Olympics (Rugby Sevens) commentator for Swiss Italian National TV.

Since 2010 he has collaborated with Australian radio broadcaster SBS.

In 2011, Tramontin created and hosted the show Oval Bin, co-anchored by Daniela Scalia and Gianluca Veneziano.

In February 2013, Tramontin and Scalia hosted ESP Hockey, a weekly magazine show, focused on the Suisse NLA ice hockey championship, on Espansione TV.

In 2017 Scalia and Tramontin created, produced and anchored on Sportitalia FUNalysis, a show about the unbelievable aspects of the most remote sports. Addressed also to a no-sport audience, the program covered the humoristic and social aspect of "The Ashes" (cricket clash between Australia and England), the relevance of Gaelic Football in identity, music and folklore, the misconceptions about the weight lifting training and more.

Since 2025, writes for "The Cricketer", the world's oldest cricket magazine.

In February 2026 the "Commentopoli" accusations about corruption in TV Sport comment assignment were republished. The lines, previously printed in the book In onda con 3 dita, displayed why major Italian TV networks paid commentators without any knowledge of the broadcast sports. Tramontin announced that since the publication he would not comment again on television in Italy.

== Sport Crime ==
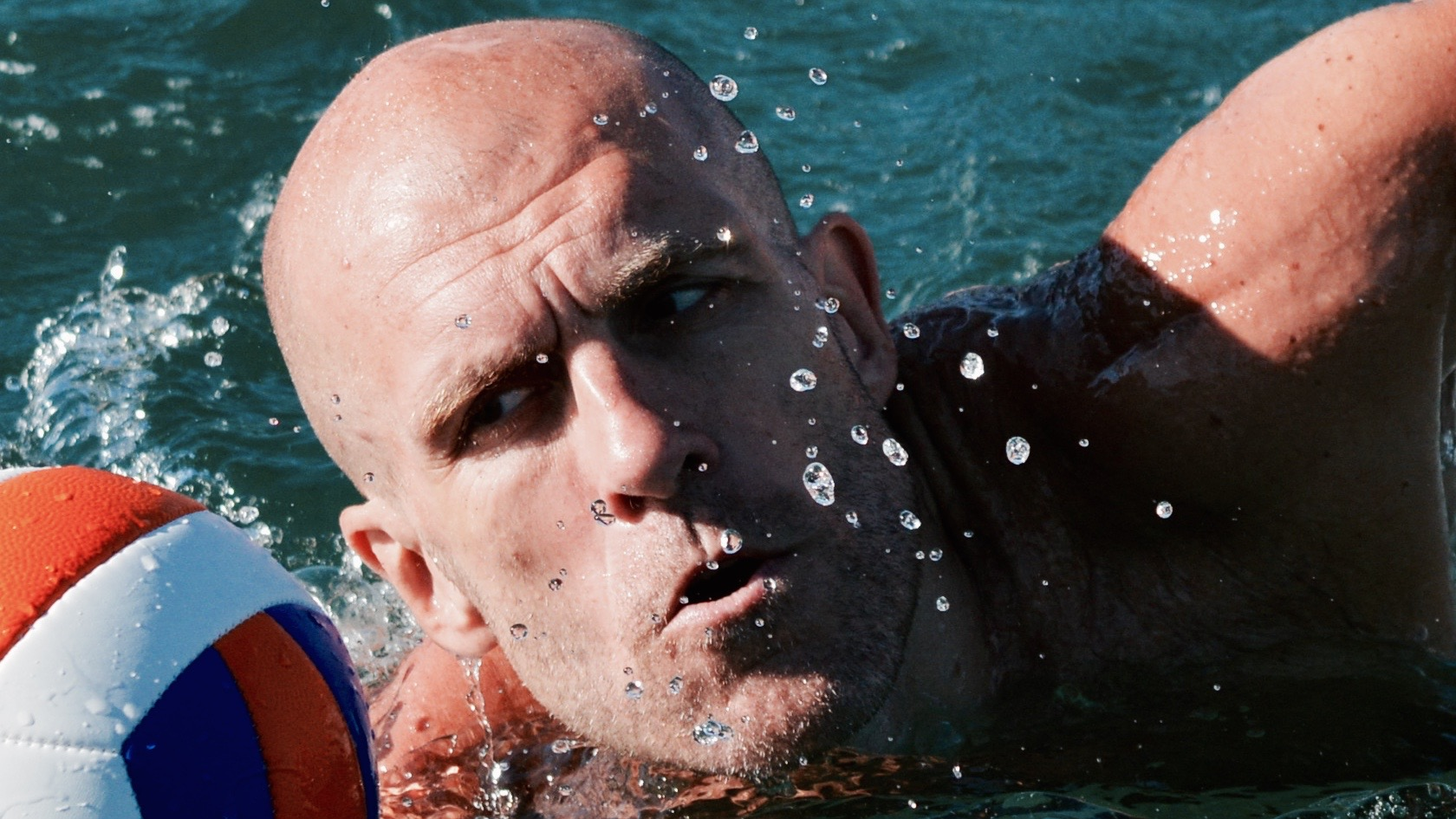
Luca Tramontin in a waterpolo scene

Sport Crime is a TV series about sports investigations, it tells the stories of the Seams Agency, based in Lugano. Any episode is based on a different sport and features real sports actions in a classic investigation plot with an international cast.

Tramontin acts as the main character Luka "Dabs" Kriv.

Launched in 2022, season 1 is distributed by Prime Video US and UK, and Chili in Italy.

Season 2 was launched at the 80th Venice Film Festival.

"The Legacy Run" is a television film introducing some of Sport Crime themes that had its world premier on Swiss national tv on the 4 December 2016.

== Sports career ==
Tramontin joined 1st division club Rugby Casale in 1985. He played for seven seasons as a second rower. He had a short stint with Occhiali Vogue Belluno, which had reached Serie A, but he returned to Casale after some disciplinary issues. In the 1989 off season, he traveled to play in the New England Rugby Union Cup in Glen Innes, New South Wales, Australia, where he got in touch also with cricket, rugby league and Aussie rules. Then coach Colin Price advised Luca to train twice a week with the local rugby league team in order to improve his deficitary ball handling. In reflecting on his Australian visit, Tramontin said, "those awkward hours in the park opened up my mind forever" as he would later leave rugby union to play the games he learned down under. In the 1990 off season, after getting the 1st degree, he biked through Thailand and Malaysia for two and a half months, and returned late and underweight to the Casale summer camp. As a result, he had a low rate season where he was relegated to the bench.

From 1992-2006, he played on various clubs in Piacenza, Viadana, Brescia, New York City, and three different clubs in Milan.

In 2006, Tramontin moved to Bellinzona, Switzerland, where he joined the local rugby club at Ticino at the age of 41, and joined the Hungarian national team, which he qualified through ancestry. He also fulfilled his dream of playing ice hockey, albeit at a very low level; this was documented on his television show, Oval Bin. He joined a rugby club in Lugano and contributed as a starter. He joined the Swiss team for two weekends in Lausanne under Toulosan coach Patrice Philippe. Being over 40 and having an official cap with Hungary, there were hopes that he would be permitted to join.

In 2008, Tramontin left rugby union to play Australian rules football (abbreviated as Aussie Rules or Orules) in the summer, and amateur ice hockey in the winter. He participated on AFL Italia for nine caps and was the captain when the national team participated in the 2009 European Cup held in Samobor, Croatia. For the 2010 European Cup, he represented AFL Switzerland as the team made its debut; he served as the team's coach.

In 2011, Tramontin was asked to help the Hungarian national rugby team, the Magyar Bulls, who made its first appearance in international competition. He played for the team against the Czech Republic in a match in Kecskemét, Hungary. He later decided the commitment was too high as he had been playing for AFL Switzerland and was a television commentator.

He has been playing Australian Rules football for the Lugano Bankers, and amateur ice hockey during their off season.

=== Disabled rugby ===
Tramontin invented a new formula for disabled people to play full contact oval ball.

For serious mental and perceptive diseases, the game consists in a code halfway between rugby and Australian Football, while for medium degree of disability the teams created by Tramontin adopt the Orules/Australian Football rules except for number of players and length of the periods.

Tramontin is very close to any form of team sport for disabled people, both organizing or practicing himself.

=== Ice hockey ===
Luca's flirt with hockey started three years before his rugby as a kid supporter of Alleghe Hockey Club, but due to distant ice rinks, parent's split and heavy rugby commitments he never embraced it as a player before 2006. The "GGDT" GDT Hockey club Bellinzona started in 2006, at amateur level, with 5-6 matches for year, Luca claims to have missed no more than 4 training per year so far, mixing it well with other sport and work commitments. His son Nico started his hockey career with the same club as a defensive man. Since 2020 GGDT Hockey is the longest club alliance for Tramontin as a player (Belluno Rugby he played for 13 years, GGDT 14). He plays regularly as a defensive forechecking forward despite a heavy deficit in ice skating due to his late start.

In 2014 Luca played and trained for all the pre-season with Rivera Vikings (Ticino local premiership) featuring also in some games as a defensive and forechecking winger. Eventually he had to leave again, due to the Cannes Film Festival and the imminent start of Sport Crime shooting.

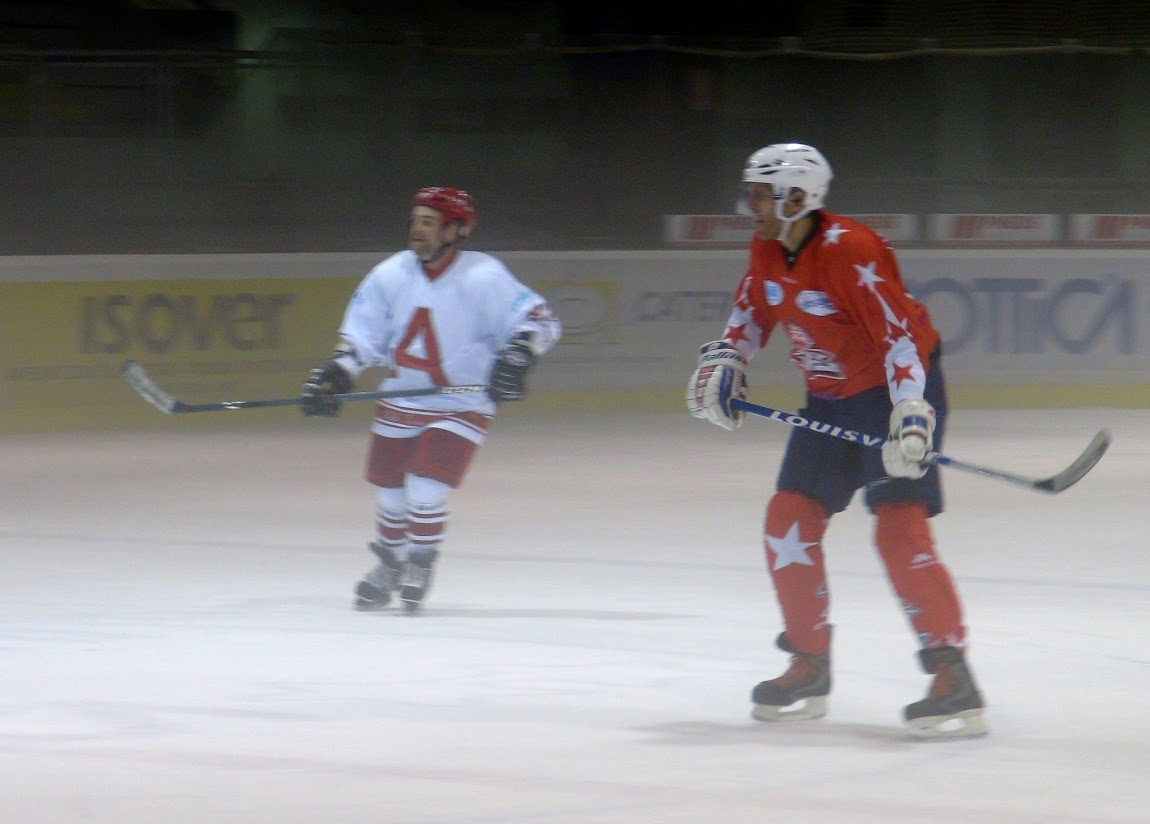
Tramontin play hockey, 2012

Since his move to Switzerland Tramontin co-operates with various ice hockey teams for crossover trainings, both amateur and professional like HC Lugano. In a recent episode of "La Domenica Sportiva" Tramontin addressed the paucity of collision technique as one of the reason for the increase of concussions in the game.

He had sessions and clinics with Russian KHL destined players at Dmitri Tsygourov Camp (Aosta), Ticino Rockets (Swiss 2nd division), HC Lugano (1st division).

=== Association football ===
June 2019, national Swiss TV and several media reported that the "Sport Crime" duo Daniela Scalia and Luca Tramontin have been working since September 2018 coaching FC Lugano Settore Giovanile with techniques and drills partly custom created and partly from rugby. The protocol is said immensely useful by neo president and owner Leonid Novoselskyi and coaches of the professional team.

=== GAA ===
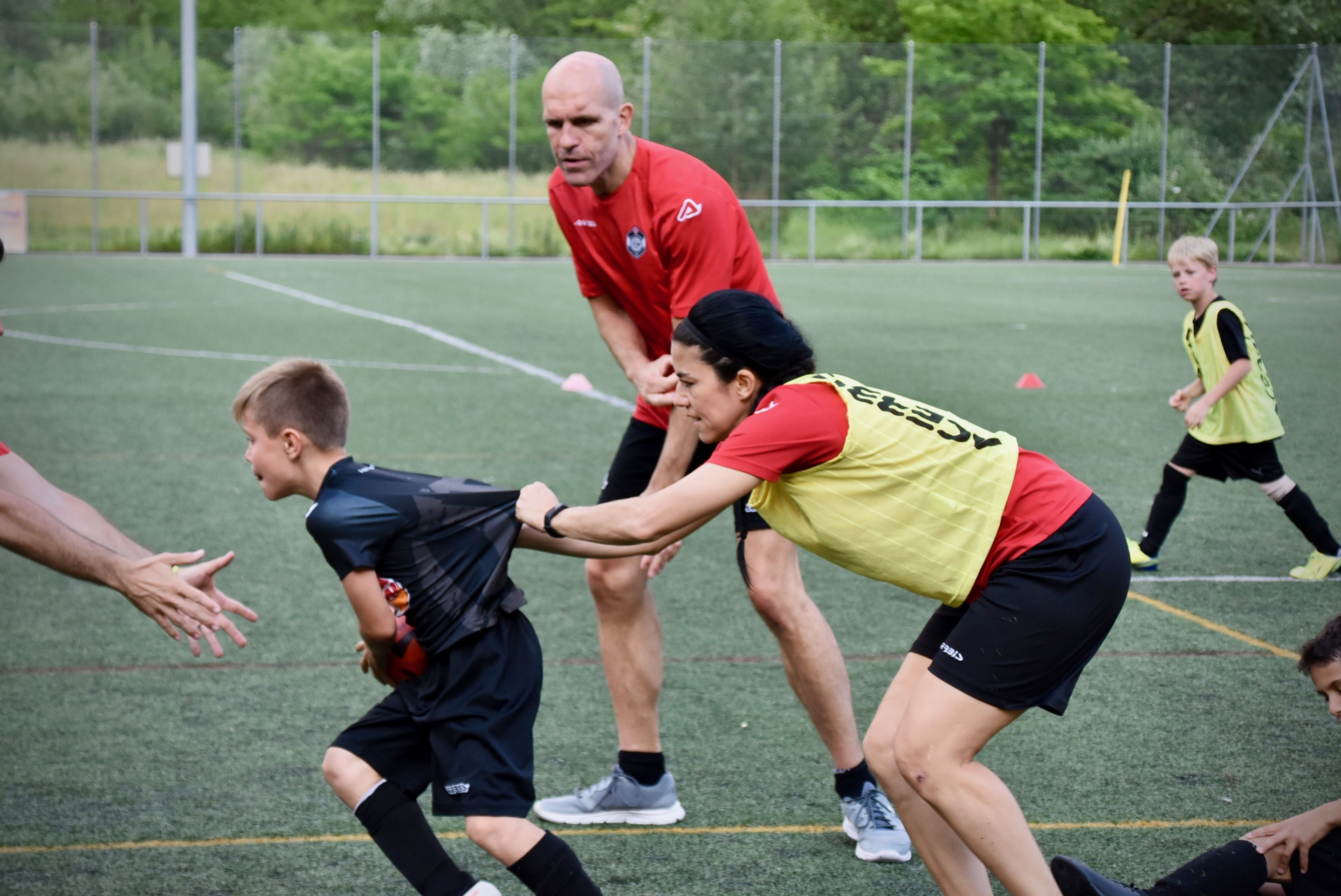
Tramontin coaching rugby, 2019

Tramontin saw a few GAA and hurling finals live in Dublin in early 2000, stating the interest goes back a long time, that means to his Australian stints where "International Rules" and a vast Irish community made him aware of this game and hurling too. According to his habit of getting physically involved in the sports he comments (for Eurosport in this case) he started playing with Ascaro Rovigo, the first Italian GAA club. He also has a "A" (basic) Hurling referee license.

== Sports history ==
Tramontin talks about sports history at universities or venues. Daniela Scalia normally hosts the event with guests. The allure of the events is very straight, more history focused in academic ambient, more colloquial and rich in episodes and humor in public houses.

== Personal life ==
Tramontin was born with a deformity at the right hand. Although he had frequent surgery in his first years, he said that it never affected his sports ability, his social life or guitar playing. He jokes about it on his shows. Tramontin has never received compensation or any kind of support for the deformity on his right hand being the indemnity only for those born before 31.12.1965. His family and he paid for all the 16 surgeries, including 13 skin transplants from the buttock to the fingers.

Tramontin was nicknamed "Diavolo" (Devil) by Pierpaolo Pedroni in 1987. Pedroni was Tramontin's rival on the field, and a good friend and rock buddy off-field. Pedroni has appeared on Tramontin's shows before he died in 2009.

Tramontin also plays field hockey, floorball, cricket, tennis, badminton, and swimming. With regards to cricket, he said that he "never saw someone bowling worse than me". He is a supporter of the Alleghe Hockey club.

In April 2020, during the COVID-19 pandemic, he made the cover of Sport di più Magazine, chosen as a strength and resilience icon. In the long interview with director Alberto Cristani he stated he's been hit in the healing buttock by a "bastard of a nun" when he was just 7 years old.

== Early life ==
Tramontin was born in Belluno, Italy to Vally Carnio and Elio Tramontin. He lived in Mestre, Venice until the age of 10; he often spent time with his maternal grandmother Elvira, who was a French-raised Hungarian, and grandfather Mario, whom he credits as "the biggest influence besides Rolling Stones". He and his younger brother Diego often moved several times between mother's and father's house after parents split and spent time in different places in the Belluno area to eventually move back to Mestre. He learned to play rugby and was persuaded to try soccer because of a deformity in his right hand. During the off seasons for rugby, he would play different sports, including swimming, street hockey, basketball, beach volleyball, tennis and badminton. He said there were "too many to recall, I just remember I was very limited in everything I practised, but t was good fun and good training for rugby".

At school, the Tramontin brothers had a reputation of being "very bad students" and "loud pranksters" who would "rather play rugby and hard rock", but "eventually blossomed at university". Luca played several times against Diego, who would become a professional rugby player, in the Italian 1st division rugby; he claimed it was very ordinary to be physical to each other and stressed that Diego was a much better player than he.

== Curiosities ==
in 2016 Tramontin released a detailed interview to the Maltese journalist Nadia Vella about his long time affair with guinea pigs: "Guinea pigs are not persons. I know it, rationally speaking, but feeling-wise I feel them very close to human beings. They have 3 fingers like me, and they use them well with not much thinking needed. There is a guinea pig in House of Cards but it is not very visible, and is owned by an antisocial hacker, in Sport Crime it will be seen in a totally different light".

== Cooking show ==
Admittedly a "no-cook" who enjoys food in a healthy manner, Luca has been called as a guest in the Swiss cook show, Piattoforte, the logic of producer Aldina Crespi being to highlight the contrast between the cook, the food loving environment and the natural "punk" attitude of Tramontin.
