= Nino Castelnuovo =

Italian actor (1936–2021)

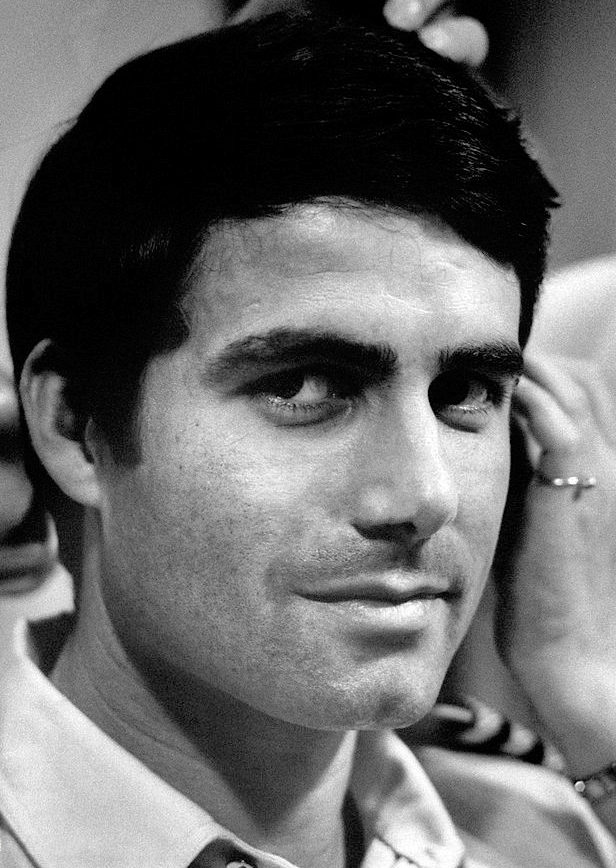
- Castelnuovo in 1967
- Born: Francesco Castelnuovo; 28 October 1936; Lecco, Italy
- Died: 6 September 2021 (aged 84); Rome, Italy
- Occupation: Actor
- Years active: 1957–2021

Francesco "Nino" Castelnuovo (28 October 1936 – 6 September 2021) was an Italian actor of film, stage and television, best known for his starring role as Guy Foucher in the French musical film The Umbrellas of Cherbourg (1964).

Castelnuovo's other films include Rocco and His Brothers (1960), Camille 2000 (1969), L'emmerdeur (1973), The Bloodstained Lawn (1973), Massacre Time (1966), The Five Man Army (1969), and The English Patient (1996).

== Early life ==
Castelnuovo was born the youngest of three boys in Lecco, Lombardy as the son of maid Emilia Paola (née Sala) and button factory employee Camillo Castelnuovo. He had two older brothers, Pierantonio (b. 1930; d. 1976) and Clemente. After being a house painter, a mechanic and a workman, he moved to Milan, where he started working as a sales agent, and at the same time, he enrolled in the acting school of the Piccolo Teatro in Milan. He became a father for the first time to his son Lorenzo when he married Danila Trebbi (b. 1955), an Italian actress.

== Career ==
In 1957, Castelnuovo debuted as a mime in the RAI children's television show Zurli il mago del giovedì.

He landed a small part in The Facts of Murder (1959), directed by Pietro Germi, and played supporting roles in films, including The Hunchback of Rome, directed by Carlo Lizzani, and Rocco and His Brothers, directed by Luchino Visconti; both were released in 1960.

When the American television show Disneyland travelled to Italy in 1962, he appeared with Annette Funicello in two episodes of the mini-movie, Escapade in Florence, singing, playing the guitar, and adding the Italian verses to the jovial tarantella "Dream Boy".

Castelnuovo's breakthrough role arrived with The Umbrellas of Cherbourg (1964), directed by Jacques Demy, in which he played opposite Catherine Deneuve. Nominated for the American Academy Award for Best Foreign Language Film, the film gained the attention of both film critics and the public, and won the Palme d'Or at the Cannes Film Festival in February of the same year.

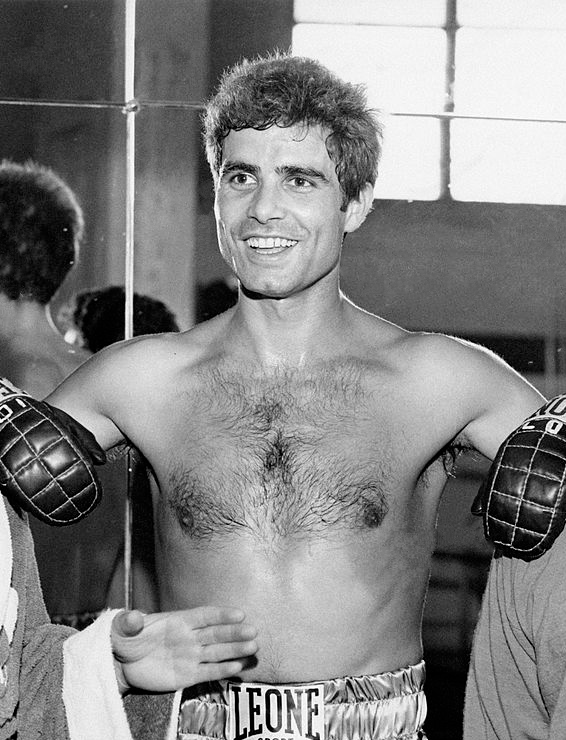
Castelnuovo in 1968

After the box-office failures Un mondo nuovo (1966), directed by Vittorio De Sica, and The Reward, directed by Serge Bourguignon, – he gained notice as an actor in Italy because of his role of Renzo in the television mini-series I promessi sposi (1967).

He also starred alongside an international cast in The Five Man Army (1969), directed by Don Taylor, as a Mexican revolutionary, and as Armand in Camille 2000 (1969), directed by Radley Metzger.

From then on, Castelnuovo was featured primarily on television serials around Europe, where he portrayed numerous parts. He appeared as the athletically sound spokesman for the corn oil company Cuore from 1977 to 1982.

Castelnuovo also appeared briefly as D'Agostino in The English Patient (1996), and he continued to be active on the Italian theatre stage. In 2002, he starred in a production of the 1931 comedy play The Front Page (Italian title, Prima Pagina). In 2016 he appeared as Kenny Butler in The Legacy Run.

== Death ==
Castelnuovo died on 6 September 2021 in Rome at the age of 84.

== Selected filmography ==
Year	Title	Role	Notes
1956	The Virtuous Bigamist	Minor rôle	Uncredited
1959	The Facts of Murder	L'Elettricista	
1960	The Angel Wore Red	Capt. Trinidad	Uncredited
1960	Rocco and His Brothers	Nino Rossi	
1960	La garçonnière	Vincenzo	
1960	Everybody Go Home	Codegato	
1960	The Hunchback of Rome	Cencio	
1961	Laura nuda	Franco - Laura's husband	
1961	A Day for Lionhearts	Danilo	
1961	Day by Day, Desperately	Gabriele Dominici	
1962	Escapade in Florence	Bruno	
1963	The Shortest Day	Corteggiatore	Uncredited
1963	The Eye of the Needle	Nicola Badalà	
1963	The Umbrellas of Cherbourg	Guy Foucher	
1964	Una sporca faccenda		
1964	The Cavern	Mario Scognamiglio	
1965	The Double Bed	L'amant	Segment 2 "Le monstre"
1965	The Reward	Luis	
1965	Made in Italy	Dr. Gavino Piras	Segment "2 'Il Lavoro', episode 2")
1966	Un monde nouveau	Carlo	
1966	Andremo in città	Ivan, un partigiano	
1966	Massacre Time	Jason 'Junior' Scott	
1966	Les Créatures	Jean Modet	
1967	On My Way to the Crusades, I Met a Girl Who...	Marculfo	
1968	Code Name: Red Roses	Vincent	
1969	Psychout for Murder	Mario	
1969	Mercanti di vergini		
1969	Love and Anger	The Director	Segment "L'amore"
1969	The Five Man Army	Luis Dominguez	
1969	Camille 2000	Armand Duval	
1969	Diary of a Telephone Operator	Piero	
1970	The Divorce	Piero	
1971	Bella di giorno moglie di notte	Giorgio	
1972	Colpo grosso... grossissimo... anzi probabile	Sandro	
1973	The Bloodstained Lawn	A UNESCO agent	
1973	L'emmerdeur	Bellhop	
1973	The Sibyl Cipher	Emilio Trenti	
1974	Loving in the Rain	Giovanni	
1975	Strip Nude for Your Killer	Carlo	
1975	Strip First, Then We Talk	Giuliano	
1975	That Malicious Age	Napoleone	
1975	La collegiale	Marco	
1979	Star Odyssey	Lt. Oliver 'Hollywood' Carrera	
1996	The English Patient	D'Agostino	
2001	With the Killer's Eyes	Ernesto Longhi	
2003	Senza la parola fine		
2010	Il sottile fascino del peccato	Padre di Giada	
2016	The Legacy Run	Kenny Butler	
