= Jean Gabin filmography =

French actor filmography

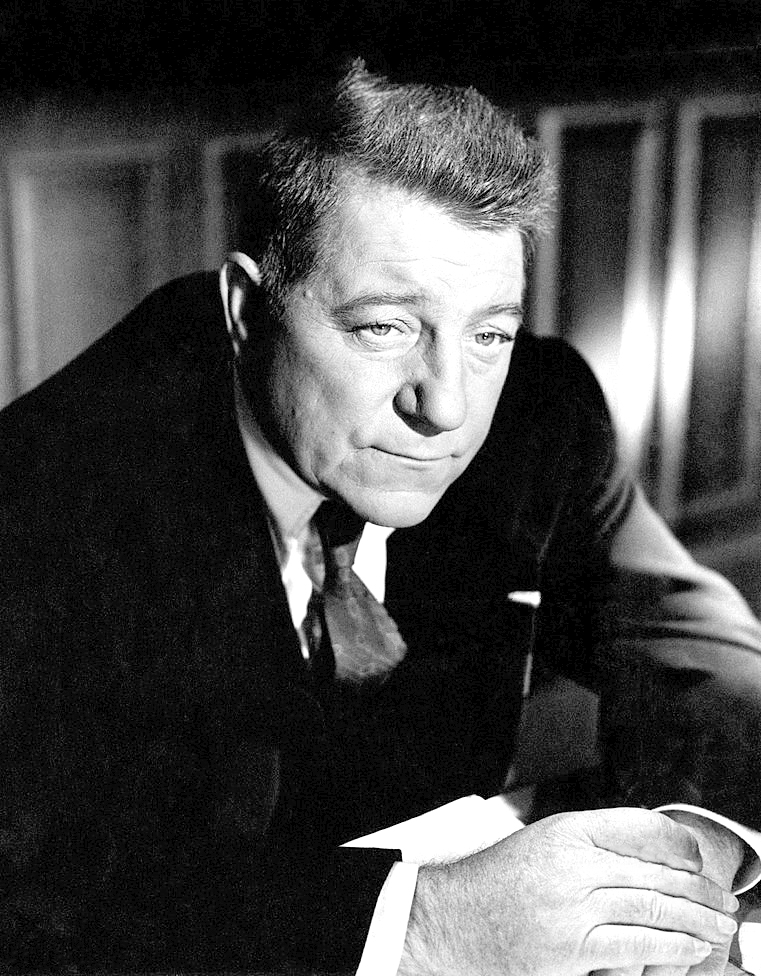
Jean Gabin in 1995

Jean Gabin (17 May 1904 – 15 November 1976) was a French actor. Becoming one of France's most recognised actors in the 1930s, his acting career continued through the post-war period and also included a career as a singer. He was awarded the Silver Bear for Best Actor at the Berlin International Film Festival and the Volpi Cup for Best Actor at the Venice Film Festival twice each.

== Filmography ==
Gabin is credited with the following appearances.

Year	Title	Role	Director	Notes
1930	Everybody Wins	Marcel Grivot	Hans Steinhoff, René Pujol	French-language version of Headfirst into Happiness
1930	L'Héritage de Lilette		Michel Du Lac	Short; With Raymond Dandy Alternative title Ohé les valises
1930	On demande un dompteur			Short; With Raymond Dandy Alternative title Les Lions
1931	Méphisto	Inspector Jacques Miral	Henri Debain; Georges Vinter	Serial film with four episodes With René Navarre Based on a novel by Arthur Bernède
1931	The Darling of Paris	Bob	Augusto Genina	
1931	All That's Not Worth Love	Jean Cordier	Jacques Tourneur	
1931	Gloria	Robert Nourry	Hans Behrendt, Yvan Noé	French-language version of Gloria
1931	For an Evening	Jean	Jean Godard	
1932	Lilac	Martousse	Anatole Litvak	Based on a play by Tristan Bernard and Charles-Henry Hirsch
1932	Fun in the Barracks	Fricot	Maurice Tourneur	With Fernandel and Raimu; Based on a play by Georges Courteline
1932	La foule hurle	Joe Greer	Jean Daumery, (uncredited: Howard Hawks)	French-language version of The Crowd Roars
1932	The Beautiful Sailor	The Captain	Harry Lachman	With Madeleine Renaud and Pierre Blanchar; Based on a play by Marcel Achard
1932	Happy Hearts	Charles	Hanns Schwarz, Max de Vaucorbeil	French-language version of Gypsies of the Night
1933	For an Evening	Jean	Jean Godard	Shot 1931
1933	The Star of Valencia	Pedro Savedra	Serge de Poligny	With Brigitte Helm; French-language version of The Star of Valencia
1933	Goodbye, Beautiful Days	Pierre Lavernay	Johannes Meyer, André Beucler	With Brigitte Helm; French-language version of Happy Days in Aranjuez
1933	High and Low	Charles Boulla	G. W. Pabst	With Michel Simon and Peter Lorre
1933	The Tunnel	Allan Mac Allan	Curtis Bernhardt	With Madeleine Renaud and Gustaf Gründgens; French-language version of The Tunnel
1934	Maria Chapdelaine	François Paradis	Julien Duvivier	With Madeleine Renaud and Jean-Pierre Aumont; Adaptation of Louis Hémon's novel Maria Chapdelaine; NBR Award 1935
1934	Zouzou	Jean	Marc Allégret	With Josephine Baker
1935	Golgotha	Pontius Pilate	Julien Duvivier	With Harry Baur and Edwige Feuillère
1935	La Bandera (Escape from Yesterday)	Pierre Gilleth	Julien Duvivier	With Annabella; Adaptation of Pierre Mac Orlan's novel La Bandera
1935	Variétés	Georges	Nicolas Farkas	With Annabella and Fernand Gravey; French-language version of Variety
1936	They Were Five	Jeannot	Julien Duvivier	With Charles Vanel and Viviane Romance
1936	The Lower Depths	Pepel Wasska	Jean Renoir	With Louis Jouvet; Adaptation of Maxim Gorky's The Lower Depths; Louis Delluc Prize 1937
1937	Pépé le Moko	Pépé le Moko	Julien Duvivier	Remade twice in the US: Algiers (1938) and Casbah (1948)
1937	La Grande Illusion	Lieutenant Maréchal	Jean Renoir	With Erich von Stroheim, Pierre Fresnay and Marcel Dalio; NBR Award 1938
1937	The Messenger	Nick Dange	Raymond Rouleau	With Jean-Pierre Aumont Based on a play by Henri Bernstein
1937	Lady Killer	Lucien Bourrache	Jean Grémillon	Adaptation of a novel by André Beucler
1938	Port of Shadows	Jean	Marcel Carné	With Michèle Morgan, Michel Simon and Pierre Brasseur; Based on a novel by Pierre Mac Orlan; Louis Delluc Prize 1939
1938	La Bête humaine (The Human Beast)	Jacques Lantier	Jean Renoir	With Simone Simon; Adaptation of Émile Zola's novel La Bête humaine
1939	Coral Reefs	Trott Lennart	Maurice Gleize	With Michèle Morgan; Adaptation of a novel by Jean Martet
1939	Le jour se lève (Daybreak)	François	Marcel Carné	With Arletty and Jules Berry; Remade in the US as The Long Night (1947) starring Henry Fonda
1941	Stormy Waters	Captain André Laurent	Jean Grémillon	With Michèle Morgan and Madeleine Renaud; Adaptation of a novel by Roger Vercel
1942	Moontide	Bobo	Archie Mayo	American film With Ida Lupino and Claude Rains; Adaptation of a novel by Willard Robertson
1944	The Impostor	Clement / Maurice Lafarge	Julien Duvivier	American film
1946	Martin Roumagnac (The Room Upstairs)	Martin Roumagnac	Georges Lacombe	With Marlene Dietrich; Adaptation of a novel by Pierre-René Wolf
1947	Mirror	Pierre Lussac / Miroir	Raymond Lamy	
1949	The Walls of Malapaga	Pierre Arrignon	René Clément	With Isa Miranda; Academy Award for Best Foreign Language Film
1950	La Marie du port	Henri Chatelard	Marcel Carné	Adaptation of a novel by Georges Simenon
1950	His Last Twelve Hours	Carlo Bacchi	Luigi Zampa	
1951	Victor	Victor	Claude Heymann	Based on a play by Henri Bernstein
1951	The Night Is My Kingdom	Raymond Pinsard	Georges Lacombe	Volpi Cup for Best Actor at the 12th Venice International Film Festival
1952	La Vérité sur Bébé Donge (The Truth About Bebe Donge)	François Donge	Henri Decoin	(segment "La Maison Tellier"); With Danielle Darrieux; Adaptation of a novel by Georges Simenon
1952	Le Plaisir (House of Pleasure)	Joseph Rivet	Max Ophüls	With Danielle Darrieux, Madeleine Renaud and Pierre Brasseur; An anthology film based on three stories by Guy de Maupassant
1952	La Minute de vérité (The Moment of Truth)	Dr. Pierre Richard	Jean Delannoy	With Michèle Morgan and Daniel Gélin
1953	Storms	Antonio Sanna	Guido Brignone	With Silvana Pampanini and Serge Reggiani
1953	Their Last Night	Pierre Fernand Ruffin	Georges Lacombe	With Madeleine Robinson
1953	Rhine Virgin	Jacques Ledru / Martin Schmidt	Gilles Grangier	With Nadia Gray Adaptation of a novel by Pierre Nord
1954	Touchez pas au grisbi (Don't Touch the Loot)	Max	Jacques Becker	With Jeanne Moreau and Lino Ventura; Adaptation of a novel by Albert Simonin; Volpi Cup for Best Actor at the 15th Venice International Film Festival
1954	The Air of Paris	Victor Le Garrec	Marcel Carné	With Arletty and Folco Lulli; Volpi Cup for Best Actor at the 15th Venice International Film Festival
1955	Napoléon	Marshal Jean Lannes	Sacha Guitry	Cameo
1955	Razzia sur la chnouf (Raid on the Drug Ring)	Henri Ferré	Henri Decoin	With Magali Noël, Marcel Dalio and Lino Ventura; Based on a novel by Auguste Le Breton
1955	French Cancan	Henri Danglard	Jean Renoir	With María Félix and Françoise Arnoul
1955	House on the Waterfront	Captain Lequévic	Edmond T. Gréville	With Henri Vidal
1955	The Little Rebels	Judge Julien Lamy	Jean Delannoy	Adaptation of a novel by Gilbert Cesbron
1955	Gas-Oil	Jean Chape	Gilles Grangier	With Jeanne Moreau; Based on a novel by Georges Bayle
1956	People of No Importance	Jean Viard	Henri Verneuil	With Françoise Arnoul; Based on a novel by Serge Groussard
1956	Deadlier Than the Male	André Chatelin	Julien Duvivier	Produced by Raymond Borderie (and others)
1956	Blood to the Head	François Cardinaud	Gilles Grangier	Adaptation of a novel by Georges Simenon
1956	La Traversée de Paris (The Trip Across Paris)	Grandgil	Claude Autant-Lara	With Bourvil and Louis de Funès
1956	Crime and Punishment	Commissaire Gallet	Georges Lampin	With Robert Hossein, Marina Vlady, Bernard Blier, Ulla Jacobsson and Lino Ventura; Adaptation of Dostoevsky's novel
1957	The Case of Doctor Laurent	Dr. Laurent	Jean-Paul Le Chanois	
1957	Speaking of Murder	Louis Bertain	Gilles Grangier	With Annie Girardot and Lino Ventura / Adaptation of a novel by Auguste Le Breton
1958	Maigret Sets a Trap	Jules Maigret	Jean Delannoy	With Annie Girardot and Lino Ventura; Adaptation of a novel by Georges Simenon
1958	Les Misérables	Jean Valjean	Jean-Paul Le Chanois	With Bernard Blier, Bourvil and Serge Reggiani; Adaptation of Victor Hugo's novel
1958	Le désordre et la nuit (Night Affair)	Inspector Georges Vallois	Gilles Grangier	With Danielle Darrieux and Nadja Tiller
1958	In Case of Adversity	Maître André Gobillot	Claude Autant-Lara	With Brigitte Bardot; Adaptation of a novel by Georges Simenon
1958	The Possessors	Noël Schoudler	Denys de La Patellière	With Pierre Brasseur and Bernard Blier; Adaptation of a novel by Maurice Druon
1959	Archimède le clochard (The Magnificent Tramp)	Archimède	Gilles Grangier	With Bernard Blier; Silver Bear for Best Actor at the 9th Berlin International Film Festival
1959	Maigret and the Saint-Fiacre Case	Jules Maigret	Jean Delannoy	Adaptation of a novel by Georges Simenon
1959	Rue des prairies	Henri Neveux	Denys de La Patellière	Adaptation of a novel by René Lefèvre
1960	Le Baron de l'écluse (The Baron of the Locks)	Baron Jérôme Napoléon Anthoine	Jean Delannoy	With Micheline Presle; Adaptation of a novel by Georges Simenon
1960	The Old Guard	Baptiste Talon	Gilles Grangier	With Pierre Fresnay; Adaptation of a novel by René Fallet
1961	The President	Émile Beaufort	Henri Verneuil	With Bernard Blier; Adaptation of a novel by Georges Simenon
1961	Le cave se rebiffe (The Counterfeiters of Paris)	Ferdinand Maréchal	Gilles Grangier	With Martine Carol, Bernard Blier and Françoise Rosay; Adaptation of a novel by Albert Simonin
1962	A Monkey in Winter	Albert Quentin	Henri Verneuil	With Jean-Paul Belmondo; Adaptation of Antoine Blondin's novel A Monkey in Winter
1962	The Gentleman from Epsom	Richard Briand-Charmery	Gilles Grangier	With Louis de Funès; Raymond Oliver as himself
1963	Any Number Can Win	Mister Charles	Henri Verneuil	With Alain Delon; Adaptation of a novel by Zekial Marko
1963	Maigret Sees Red	Jules Maigret	Gilles Grangier	Adaptation of a novel by Georges Simenon
1964	Monsieur	René Duchêne / Georges Baudin	Jean-Paul Le Chanois	With Liselotte Pulver, Mireille Darc and Philippe Noiret
1964	That Tender Age	Émile Malhouin	Gilles Grangier	With Fernandel
1965	God's Thunder	Léandre Brassac	Denys de La Patellière	With Lilli Palmer, Michèle Mercier and Robert Hossein; Adaptation of a novel by Bernard Clavel
1966	The Upper Hand	Paul Berger	Denys de La Patellière	With George Raft, Gert Fröbe, Mireille Darc and Nadja Tiller; Adaptation of a novel by Auguste Le Breton
1966	The Gardener of Argenteuil	Joseph Martin alias 'Tulipe'	Jean-Paul Le Chanois	With Liselotte Pulver and Curd Jürgens
1967	Action Man	Denis Ferrand	Jean Delannoy	With Robert Stack, Margaret Lee and Walter Giller
1968	Pasha	Comissaire Louis Joss	Georges Lautner	
1968	Le tatoué (The Million Dollar Tattoo)	Count Enguerand	Denys de La Patellière	With Louis de Funès
1969	Under the Sign of the Bull	Albert Raynal	Gilles Grangier	Adaptation of a novel by Roger Vrigny
1969	The Sicilian Clan	Vittorio Manalese	Henri Verneuil	With Alain Delon and Lino Ventura Score by Ennio Morricone Adaptation of a novel by Auguste Le Breton
1970	La Horse	Auguste Maroilleur	Pierre Granier-Deferre	
1971	Le Chat	Julien Bouin	Pierre Granier-Deferre	With Simone Signoret Adaptation of a novel by Georges Simenon; Silver Bear for Best Actor at the 21st Berlin International Film Festival
1971	Le drapeau noir flotte sur la marmite	Victor Ploubaz	Michel Audiard	Adaptation of a novel by René Fallet
1972	Le Tueur	Commissaire Le Guen	Denys de La Patellière	With Bernard Blier, Fabio Testi and Uschi Glas
1973	The Dominici Affair	Gaston Dominici	Claude Bernard-Aubert	Based on the Dominici affair
1973	Two Men in Town	Germain Cazeneuve	José Giovanni	With Alain Delon, Michel Bouquet and Mimsy Farmer; Remade in the US as Two Men in Town (2014) starring Forest Whitaker
1974	Verdict	Judge Leguen	André Cayatte	With Sophia Loren; Produced by Carlo Ponti
1976	L'Année sainte (Holy Year)	Max Lambert	Jean Girault	with Jean-Claude Brialy and Danielle Darrieux
