= List of crime films of the 1950s =

This is a list of crime films released in the 1950s.

Title	Director	Cast	Country	Notes
1950
Armored Car Robbery	Richard Fleischer	Charles McGraw, Adele Jergens, William Talman	United States	
The Asphalt Jungle	John Huston	Sterling Hayden, Louis Calhern, James Whitmore	United States	
The Blue Lamp	Basil Dearden	Jack Warner, Jimmy Hanley, Dirk Bogarde	United Kingdom	
The File on Thelma Jordon	Robert Siodmak	Barbara Stanwyck, Wendell Corey, Paul Kelly	United States	Crime drama
Gunman in the Streets	Frank Tuttle, Boris Lewin	Simone Signoret, Dane Clark, Fernand Gravey	France	
House by the River	Fritz Lang	Louis Hayward, Lee Bowman, Jane Wyatt	United States	Crime drama
Black Hand	Richard Thorpe	Gene Kelly, J. Carrol Naish, Teresa Celli,	United States	Crime drama
In a Lonely Place	Nicholas Ray	Humphrey Bogart, Gloria Grahame, Frank Lovejoy	United States	Crime drama
Kiss Tomorrow Goodbye	Gordon Douglas	James Cagney, Barbara Payton, Helena Carter	United States	
Night and the City	Jules Dassin	Richard Widmark, Gene Tierney, Googie Withers	United Kingdom	
No Way Out	Joseph L. Mankiewicz	Richard Widmark, Linda Darnell, Stephen McNally	United States	Crime drama
Los Olvidados	Luis Buñuel	Alfonso Mejía, Roberto Cobo, Estela Inda	Mexico	Juvenile delinquency film
Side Street	Anthony Mann	Farley Granger, Cathy O'Donnell, James Craig	United States	
Where the Sidewalk Ends	Otto Preminger	Dana Andrews, Gene Tierney, Gary Merrill	United States	Crime drama
1951
Another Man's Poison	Irving Rapper	Bette Davis, Gary Merrill, Emlyn Williams	United Kingdom	
La Città si difende	Pietro Germi	Gina Lollobrigida, Renato Baldini, Cosetta Greco	Italy	
Detective Story	William Wyler	Kirk Douglas, Eleanor Parker, William Bendix	United States	Crime drama
The Enforcer	Bretaigne Windust, Raoul Walsh	Humphrey Bogart, Zero Mostel, Ted de Corsia	United States	
The Family Secret	Henry Levin	John Derek, Lee J. Cobb, Jody Lawrance	United States	
Green Grow the Rushes	Derek N. Twist	Roger Livesey, Honor Blackman, Richard Burton	United Kingdom	
He Ran All the Way	John Berry	John Garfield, Shelley Winters, Wallace Ford	United States	
His Kind of Woman	John Farrow	Robert Mitchum, Jane Russell, Vincent Price	United States	
The Lavender Hill Mob	Charles Crichton	Alec Guinness, Stanley Holloway, Sid James	United Kingdom	
Rashomon	Akira Kurosawa	Toshirō Mifune, Masayuki Mori, Machiko Kyō	Japan	Crime drama
Roadblock	Harold Daniels	Charles McGraw, Joan Dixon, Lowell Gilmore	United States	
Strangers on a Train	Alfred Hitchcock	Farley Granger, Robert Walker, Ruth Roman	United States	Crime thriller
1952
Angel Face	Otto Preminger	Robert Mitchum, Jean Simmons, Mona Freeman	United States	
Casque d'or	Jacques Becker	Simone Signoret, Serge Reggiani, Claude Dauphin	France	Crime drama
Rancho Notorious	Fritz Lang	Arthur Kennedy, Marlene Dietrich, Mel Ferrer	United States	Crime thriller
We Are All Murderers	André Cayatte	Marcel Mouloudji, Raymond Pellegrin, Claude Laydu	France; Italy	Prison film
1953
The Big Heat	Fritz Lang	Glenn Ford, Gloria Grahame, Jocelyn Brando	United States	
The Blue Gardenia	Fritz Lang	Anne Baxter, Richard Conte, Ann Sothern	United States	Crime drama
The Hitch-Hiker	Ida Lupino	Edmond O'Brien, Frank Lovejoy, William Talman	United States	Crime thriller
I Confess	Alfred Hitchcock	Montgomery Clift, Anne Baxter, Karl Malden	United States	Crime drama
Man in the Dark	Lew Landers	Edmond O'Brien, Audrey Totter, Ted de Corsia	United States	
1954
Dial M for Murder	Alfred Hitchcock	Ray Milland, Grace Kelly, Robert Cummings	United States	Crime thriller
Human Desire	Fritz Lang	Glenn Ford, Gloria Grahame, Broderick Crawford	United States	Crime drama
Jail Bait	Edward D. Wood, Jr.	Dolores Fuller, Lyle Talbot, Herbert Rawlinson	United States	
Naked Alibi	Jerry Hopper	Sterling Hayden, Gloria Grahame, Gene Barry	United States	
Private Hell 36	Don Siegel	Ida Lupino, Steve Cochran, Howard Duff	United States	Crime drama
Rogue Cop	Roy Rowland	Robert Taylor, Janet Leigh, George Raft	United States	
The Runaway Bus	Val Guest	Margaret Rutherford, Petula Clark, George Coulouris	United Kingdom	Caper film
Suddenly	Lewis Allen	Frank Sinatra, Sterling Hayden, James Gleason	United States	
Touchez pas au grisbi	Jacques Becker	Jean Gabin, René Dary, Paul Frankeur	France; Italy	
1955
The Big Combo	Joseph H. Lewis	Cornel Wilde, Richard Conte, Brian Donlevy	United States	Gangster film
Bob le flambeur	Jean-Pierre Melville	Roger Duchesne, Isabelle Corey, Daniel Cauchy	France	
The Desperate Hours	William Wyler	Humphrey Bogart, Fredric March, Arthur Kennedy	United States	
King of the Carnival	Franklin Adreon	Fran Bennett, Robert Clarke, George de Normand	United States	
The Ladykillers	Alexander MacKendrick	Alec Guinness, Cecil Parker, Herbert Lom	United Kingdom	
The Night of the Hunter	Charles Laughton	Robert Mitchum, Shelley Winters, Lillian Gish	United States	Crime thriller
The Phenix City Story	Phil Karlson	John McIntire, Richard Kiley, Kathryn Grant	United States	
Razzia sur la chnouf	Henri Decoin	Jean Gabin, Marcel Dalio, Magali Noël	France	
Rififi	Jules Dassin	Jean Servais, Carl Möhner, Robert Manuel	France	
1956
Beyond a Reasonable Doubt	Fritz Lang	Dana Andrews, Joan Fontaine, Sidney Blackmer	United States	Crime drama
The Harder They Fall	Mark Robson	Humphrey Bogart, Rod Steiger, Jan Sterling	United States	Crime drama
The Killing	Stanley Kubrick	Sterling Hayden, Coleen Gray, Marie Windsor	United States	
Ransom!	Alex Segal	Glenn Ford, Donna Reed, Leslie Nielsen	United States	
Slightly Scarlet	Allan Dwan	John Payne, Arlene Dahl, Rhonda Fleming	United States	
The Wrong Man	Alfred Hitchcock	Henry Fonda, Vera Miles, Anthony Quayle	United States	Crime drama
Yield to the Night	J. Lee Thompson	Diana Dors, Yvonne Mitchell, Michael Craig	United Kingdom	
1957
The Adventures of Arsène Lupin	Jacques Becker	Robert Lamoureux, Liselotte Pulver, Daniel Ceccaldi	France; Italy	
The Brothers Rico	Phil Karlson	Richard Conte, Dianne Foster, Kathryn Grant	United States	
The Burglar	Paul Wendkos	Dan Duryea, Jayne Mansfield, Martha Vickers	United States	
Crime of Passion	Gerd Oswald	Barbara Stanwyck, Sterling Hayden, Raymond Burr	United States	
The Devil Strikes at Night	Robert Siodmak	Mario Adorf, Claus Holm, Hannes Messemer	West Germany	
Porte des Lilas	René Clair	Pierre Brasseur, Georges Brassens, Henri Vidal	France; Italy	Crime drama
The River's Edge	Allan Dwan	Ray Milland, Anthony Quinn, Debra Paget	United States	
Speaking of Murder	Gilles Grangier	Jean Gabin, Annie Girardot, Lino Ventura	France	
Time Without Pity	Joseph Losey	Michael Redgrave, Ann Todd, Leo McKern	United Kingdom	Crime thriller
1958
Big Deal on Madonna Street	Mario Monicelli	Vittorio Gassman, Marcello Mastroianni, Claudia Cardinale	Italy	
The Cry Baby Killer	Jus Addiss	Harry Lauter, Jack Nicholson, Carolyn Mitchell	United States	
Elevator to the Gallows	Louis Malle	Jeanne Moreau, Maurice Ronet, Georges Poujouly	France	
I Want to Live!	Robert Wise	Susan Hayward, Simon Oakland, Virginia Vincent	United States	Crime drama
I, Mobster	Roger Corman	Steve Cochran, Lita Milan, Robert Strauss	United States	
The Lineup	Don Siegel	Eli Wallach, Robert Keith, Warner Anderson	United States	
Machine-Gun Kelly	Roger Corman	Charles Bronson, Susan Cabot, Morey Amsterdam	United States	
Stakeout on Dope Street	Irvin Kershner	Herschel Bernardi	United States	
Thunder Road	Arthur Ripley	Robert Mitchum, Gene Barry, Keely Smith	United States	
Touch of Evil	Orson Welles	Charlton Heston, Janet Leigh, Orson Welles	United States	
Underworld Beauty	Seijun Suzuki	Rajo To Kenju	Japan	
1959
Al Capone	Richard Wilson	Rod Steiger, Fay Spain, James Gregory	United States	
Audace colpo dei soliti ignoti	Nanni Loy	Vittorio Gassman, Renato Salvatori, Claudia Cardinale	France; Italy	
Beast from Haunted Cave	Monte Hellman	Michael Forest, Sheila Carol, Frank Wolff	United States	Crime thriller
Compulsion	Richard Fleischer	Orson Welles, Dean Stockwell, Bradford Dillman	United States	Crime drama
Crime & Punishment, USA	Denis Sanders	George Hamilton, Mary Murphy, Frank Silvera, Eve McVeagh	United States	
The Day They Robbed the Bank of England	John Guillermin	Aldo Ray, Elizabeth Sellars, Hugh Griffith	United Kingdom	
Odds Against Tomorrow	Robert Wise	Harry Belafonte, Robert Ryan, Shelley Winters	United States	
Pickpocket	Robert Bresson	Martin Lasalle, Marika Green, Pierre Leymarie	France	Crime drama
