= Jo Peignot =

- Born: Georges Peignot; 9 January 1901; Paris, France
- Died: 10 March 1969 (aged 68); Argentan, Orne, France
- Occupation: Actor

Jo Peignot (9 January 1901 - 10 March 1969) was a French actor. He was born in Paris and died in Argentan in France.

== Biography ==
Jo Peignot have his first role in 1955 with Jean Gabin in Razzia sur la chnouf.

Jo Les Grands Pieds (name : Peignot) : boss of the famous L'Étape, rue Pierre-Charron. Feared by his courage, his rage and his powerful punch. In 1955, Jean Gabin and I had urged Henry Decoin to entrusts him a small role in Razzia sur la chnouf , taken from one of my books. Passionate about cinema, Jo should continue thereafter to hold small roles. Then helpless, having made bad business, he went to "La Moncorgerie" the Gabin's farm, who gave him hospitality; to end his life as a gardener. Disease dies in hospital.

— Auguste Le Breton, Les Pégriots, Club français du livre, 1973

== Filmography ==
=== Cinema ===
- 1955 : Razzia sur la chnouf by Henri Decoin : the intermediary with the newspaper
- 1956 : Gervaise by René Clément : Mr. Madinier
- 1956 : La Loi des rues by Ralph Habib : Raymond
- 1956 : Mitsou by Jacqueline Audry
- 1956 : The She-Wolves by Luis Saslavsky : the pharmacist
- 1957 : Le rouge est mis by Gilles Grangier : Mimile
- 1957 : Escapade by Ralph Habib
- 1957 : Méfiez-vous fillettes by Yves Allégret : Ralph
- 1957 : Not Delivered by Gilles Grangier : credited as Tréguennec but play Morigny
- 1957 : Three Days to Live by Gilles Grangier
