= Robert Hoffmann =

Austrian actor (1939–2022)

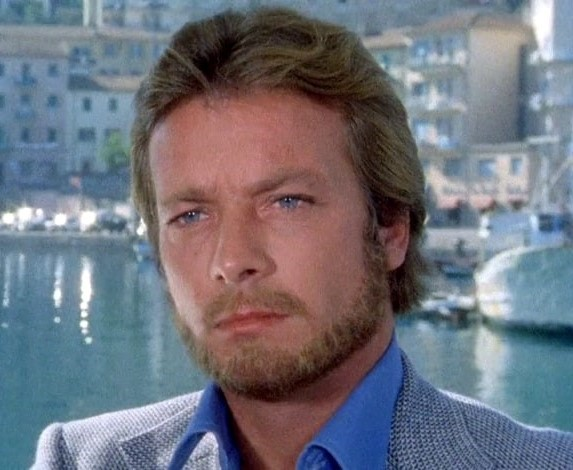
- Hoffmann in Spasmo (1974)
- Born: 30 August 1939; Salzburg, Austria
- Died: 4 July 2022 (aged 82)
- Occupation: Actor
- Years active: 1964–2004

Robert Hoffmann (30 August 1939 – 4 July 2022) was an Austrian actor, best known to British audiences for his title role performance in The Adventures of Robinson Crusoe (1964).

== Career ==
Hoffmann was born in Salzburg.

Crusoe was his screen debut, but he later worked in film (including a number of giallo horror-thrillers) and TV throughout Europe, in Germany, Italy, France the UK, and appeared in films by directors such as Marcel Carné, Antonio Pietrangeli, Robert Siodmak, and Robert Enrico.

In 1997, he was interviewed by the BBC for TV and radio when the Robinson Crusoe series was first released on video.

== Selected filmography ==
- The Adventures of Robinson Crusoe (1964, TV miniseries)
- Angélique, Marquise des Anges (1964)
- Marvelous Angelique (1965)
- Up from the Beach (1965)
- I Knew Her Well (1965)
- Three Rooms in Manhattan (1965)
- Neues vom Hexer (1965)
- The Gentlemen (1965)
- Wake Up and Die (1966)
- How I Learned to Love Women (1966)
- Grand Slam (1967)
- The Liar and the Nun (1967)
- Assignment K (1968)
- 24 Hours in the Life of a Woman (1968)
- Tevye and His Seven Daughters (1968)
- A Black Veil for Lisa (1968)
- The Last Roman (1968/69)
- Diary of a Telephone Operator (1969)
- Carnal Circuit (1969)
- The Lonely Violent Beach (1971)
- Nights and Loves of Don Juan (1971)
- Naked Girl Killed in the Park (1972)
- Death Carries a Cane (1973)
- Hubertus Castle (1973)
- Spasmo (1974)
- Le vieux fusil (1975)
- Der Edelweißkönig (1975)
- The Standard (1977)
- Eyes Behind the Stars (1978)
- The Sea Wolves (1980)
- La Septième Cible (1984)
- Clarissa (1998, TV film)
