= Behind the Walls (film) =

- Film poster
- Directed by: Christian Faure
- Written by: Albert Algoud; Christian Faure
- Based on: Hauts murs by Auguste Le Breton
- Produced by: Pierre-Ange Le Pogam; Jean Nainchrik; Patrice Onfray
- Starring: Carole Bouquet; François Damiens; Emile Berling; Pascal N'Zonzi; Catherine Jacob; Michel Jonasz; Bernard Blancan
- Cinematography: Jean-Claude Larrieu
- Music by: Charles Court
- Production companies: EuropaCorp; Septembre Productions; France 3 Cinéma; Canal+ CinéCinéma; Sofica Europacorp
- Distributed by: EuropaCorp Distribution
- Release date: 30 April 2008
- Running time: 92 minutes
- Country: France
- Language: French
- Budget: $3.1 million
- Box office: $475.000

Behind the Walls (original title: Les Hauts Murs) is a 2008 French drama film directed by Christian Faure and based on an autobiographical work, Les Hauts Murs ('The High Walls'), by Auguste Le Breton.

== Plot ==
The title refers to an approved school to which Yves Tréguier is consigned in the 1930s, he being a 14-year-old ward of the nation. There he finds friendship and learns the nature of rebellion and violence. He hopes to make his way one day to New York City in the United States.

== Cast ==
- Carole Bouquet as The wire's mother
- François Damiens as The chief officer
- Émile Berling as Yves Tréguier
- Pascal N'Zonzi as Oudie
- Catherine Jacob as The director
- Michel Jonasz as The supervisor
- Bernard Blancan as Yves's stepfather
- Guillaume Gouix as Blondeau
- Anthony Decadi as Molina
- Finnegan Oldfield as The beggar
- Julien Bouanich as The wire
- Jonathan Reyes as The rat
