= Halleluja to Vera Cruz =

1973 film

- Directed by: Bianco Manini (as Newman Rostel)
- Written by: Bianco Manini
- Produced by: Bianco Manini
- Starring: Lionel Stander; Riccardo Salvino
- Cinematography: Carlo Carlini
- Edited by: Romeo Ciatti
- Music by: Luis Bacalov
- Release date: 1973
- Country: Italy

Halleluja to Vera Cruz (Italian: Partirono preti, tornarono... curati) is a 1973 Italian spaghetti western comedy film co-written and directed by Bianco Manini and starring Lionel Stander and Riccardo Salvino.

== Cast ==
- Lionel Stander as Sam Thompson
- Riccardo Salvino as John the Timid
- Giampiero Albertini as General Monco Miguel
- Jean Louis as Don Felipe
- Clara Hopf as Adelita
- Giancarlo Badessi as Governor
- Camillo Milli as Abbot
- Tom Felleghy as Mexican Colonel
- Federico Boido as Miguel's Henchman
- Alvaro Vitali

== Production ==
The film was produced by C.I.P.D.I. Cinematografica. The director Newman Rostel has generally been identified as Bianco Manini, a film producer of spaghetti westerns such as A Bullet for the General and The Price of Power in his directorial debut. For years, however, the film was attributed to Stelvio Massi, while actor Federico Boido claimed it was directed by Alberto De Martino, a claim that De Martino strongly denied. Film editor Romeo Ciatti was credited as "collaborator to direction", and reportedly was the one who actually shot most of the film.
