= Fais-moi mal, Johnny =

Song

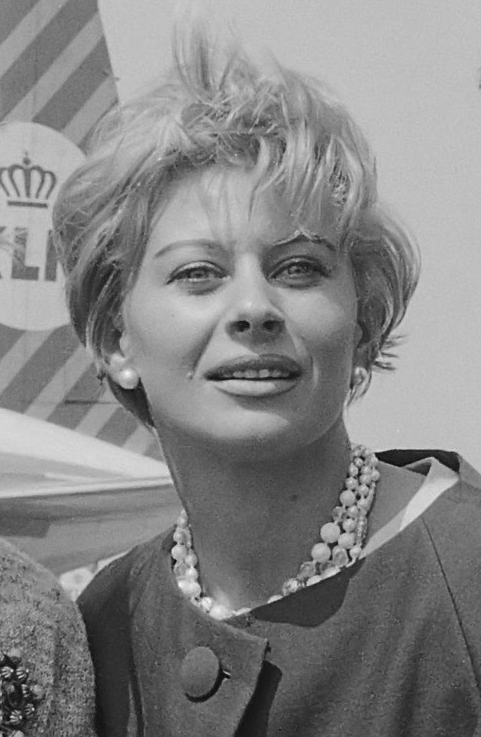
Magali Noël was the first person to perform Fais-moi mal, Johnny in 1956

Fais-moi mal, Johnny (in English: Hurt me, Johnny) is a French song written by Boris Vian, composed by Alain Goraguer in 1955, and performed for the first time by Magali Noël in 1956. It is considered one of the first French rock and roll songs.

The song tells the story of a woman who approaches a man for violent sex. The man does not understand the nature of her desire; the woman insults him to provoke him to hit her, stinging him to the quick, but then he hits her too hard and hurts her. The comedy comes from his incomprehension.

Fais-moi mal, Johnny was prohibited from being broadcast on the radio, and criticized by the Catholic church.
