= The Visit (1964 film) =

1964 film by Bernhard Wicki

- Theatrical release poster
- Directed by: Bernhard Wicki
- Written by: Ben Barzman; Maurice Valency
- Based on: The Visit by Friedrich Durrenmatt
- Produced by: Julien Derode; Anthony Quinn
- Starring: Ingrid Bergman; Anthony Quinn
- Cinematography: Armando Nannuzzi
- Edited by: Samuel E. Beetley; Françoise Diot
- Music by: Richard Arnell; Hans-Martin Majewski
- Production company: Darryl F. Zanuck Productions; Les Films du Siècle; P.E.C.F.; Dear Film; Deutsche Fox Film
- Distributed by: 20th Century-Fox
- Release dates: 6 May 1964 (Cannes); 31 July 1964 (France); 17 September 1964 (West Germany); 4 October 1964 (U.S.)
- Running time: 100 minutes
- Country: United States; France; West Germany; Italy
- Language: English
- Box office: $1.1 million (US/ Canada)

The Visit is a 1964 drama film directed by Bernhard Wicki, adapted by Ben Barzman and Maurice Valency from Friedrich Dürrenmatt's 1956 play of the same name. It stars Ingrid Bergman and Anthony Quinn, who also produced. Irina Demick, Paolo Stoppa, Hans Christian Blech, Romolo Valli, Valentina Cortese and Claude Dauphin play supporting roles.

An international co-production between American, French, West German and Italian companies, The Visit premiered at the 1964 Cannes Film Festival, where it was nominated for the Palme d'Or. It was released in the United States on September 17, 1964, and received generally positive reviews.

== Plot ==
Karla Zachanassian, a wealthy woman, returns to the decaying village where she grew up. She had been run out of town twenty years prior when, at 17 years old, she was impregnated by local shopkeeper Serge Miller; at his trial, Serge denied paternity and bribed two local men to testify that they had slept with Karla, destroying her credibility and ensuring he would not be found liable. The greedy townspeople now welcome Karla back in the hopes that she will give them money to revive the town, which has fallen into economic depression since the closing of the local factory.

At a reception in her honour, Karla offers to give the town $2,000,000 ($1,000,000 for the town itself, and $1,000,000 to be divided equally amongst the population) on the condition that Serge be put to death. The townspeople act indignant, but soon turn on Serge, while Karla watches gleefully from her hotel. First, they demand expensive items from Serge's shop on credit. Later, Karla imports expensive items such as televisions, furniture, and designer clothes, and offers them to the town on credit without down payment. She also befriends Anya, a young, naïve girl who is having an affair with the much older, married chief of police, whom Karla sees as a young version of herself.

Serge appeals to the corrupt mayor and chief of police, only to find they have been seduced as well. When Karla's pet panther escapes, the town organises an armed posse to find it, which quickly turns into a lynch mob targeting Serge; at this point, even his wife forsakes him. Serge tries to flee the town, but the population refuses to let him leave. Eventually, the council (which has expelled Serge) reinstates the death penalty, and convenes a kangaroo court in the town square. The mayor and chief of police offer Serge the chance to die by suicide, but he refuses. He is found guilty at the trial and sentenced to death.

Karla immediately hands over two $1,000,000 cheques, to the cheers of the crowd. Karla then stops the execution and tells the citizens that they will have to live with the guilt of their murderous choice for the rest of their lives, while Miller will have to live with the knowledge that his wife, friends, and neighbours were willing to kill him for money.

Karla leaves the town, after giving Anya enough money and a car of her own to escape her fate.

== Cast ==
- Ingrid Bergman as Karla Zachannassian
- Anthony Quinn as Serge Miller
- Paolo Stoppa as the Doctor
- Valentina Cortese as Mathilda Miller
- Irina Demick as Anya
- Romolo Valli as the Town Painter
- Claude Dauphin as Bardick
- Jacques Dufilho as Constable Fisch
- Hans Christian Blech as Captain Dobrik
- Richard Münch as the Teacher
- Ernst Schröder as the Mayor
- Leonard Steckel as the Priest
- Eduardo Ciannelli as the Innkeeper
- Marco Guglielmi as Constable Chesco
- Lelio Luttazzi as First Idler
- Dante Maggio as Cadek
- Renzo Palmer as the Conductor
- Fausto Tozzi as Darvis
- Max Frisch as Himself

== Production ==
The fictional Central European village of Güllen was built on the backlots of Cinecittà Studios in Rome, while the exteriors were shot on-location in the town of Capranica.

The film contains several differences from Friedrich Dürrenmatt's original play. A significant alteration is in the ending. In the film, Serge Miller's life is spared, but in the original play, the character (named Alfred Ill) is killed.

Ingrid Bergman and Anthony Quinn would later costar again in the 1970 romantic melodrama A Walk in the Spring Rain.

== Reception ==
According to Fox records, the film needed to earn $6,100,000 in film rentals to break even but earned only $2,635,000, losing money for the studio.

=== Awards and nominations ===
- Bernhard Wicki was nominated for the Golden Palm at the 1964 Cannes Film Festival.
- The film received a nomination for Best Costume Design-Black and White (René Hubert) at the Academy Awards.

== See also ==
- List of American films of 1964
