= Naked Girl Killed in the Park =

1972 film

- Film poster
- Directed by: Alfonso Brescia
- Written by: Antonio Fos; Gianni Martucci; Peter Skeri; Michael Skerl
- Starring: Robert Hoffmann
- Cinematography: Alfonso Nieva
- Edited by: Rolando Salvatori
- Music by: Carlo Savina
- Production companies: Luis Film; Dauro Films
- Distributed by: Florida Cinematografica (Italy); Procinor (Spain)
- Release dates: 30 May 1972 (Italy); 29 April 1974 (Spain)
- Running time: 92 minutes
- Countries: Italy; Spain
- Languages: Italian; English

Naked Girl Killed in the Park (Italian: Ragazza tutta nuda assassinata nel parco, Spanish: Joven de buena familia sospechosa de asesinato) is a 1972 giallo film directed by Alfonso Brescia, co-written by Gianni Martucci and starring Robert Hoffmann and Adolfo Celi.

== Plot ==
In World War II Berlin, a mother and a son are tied up at their chateau, while a Nazi soldier assembles a time bomb. A young woman with a distinctive ring watches the whole ordeal. The bomb explodes as the war keeps raging with blasts throughout the city.

In present-day Madrid, a Tunnel of Horrors theme park attraction holds a tram car with a dead aristocrat Johannes Wallenberger. Johannes took out a life insurance policy of a million dollars on the day he was killed, and the insurance company is evaluating whether they should demand their money back. They send their best investigator, young, charismatic Chris Buyer, who's had an immaculately perfect closing record, to infiltrate the family.

Chris attends a posh reception party where one of the family's daughters, Catherine, is in attendance. Chris arrives late, and his boss instructs him to gain her trust. Chris brings Catherine a drink, but she ends up rebuffing him, revealing she's been blackmailed by harassing phone calls about her father's murder. She believes that Chris is responsible, which he calmly reassures her against. Catherine sees a man following and watching her, and she decides to leave the venue.

Catherine requests Chris drive her back to her town house. Once he convinces her, Chris gets an agreement from Catherine to join him for a date around the city. Catherine gets yet another call, this time of breathing on the other line. She locks the door, but an intruder tries to get through. The intruder scales the roof and pulls out a ligature before getting in through the door. Catherine sees this and faints, but instead of the attacker harming her, he puts her to bed and cleans up the room as if it never happened.

Chris and Catherine share their date at the amusement park, in a restaurant where Chris' wife Kirsty works as a waitress, but is careful to not blow his cover. The man from the party follows them to the restaurant, and when Catherine tries to follow him out, she sees the Tunnel of Horrors ride and has a panic attack. Chris goes to the hospital with her. Catherine eventually takes Chris to her family mansion to get him acquainted with the family. Her older sister, the flirtatious and insidious Barbara, surprises them while Chris drives by her appearing on horseback. At the mansion, Chris meets Günther, the deaf-mute stableman, maid Sybil, and butler Bruno. Barbara continuously comes onto Chris, but he rejects her every time. Johannes' study, where his things are being moved to, is off limits by the orders of matriarch Magda, who's still in shock from her husband's death and speaks to him as if he can hear her from beyond. She wears the same ring as the woman who was present in the opening Berlin bombing.

Chris tries to get inside the restricted room, but Magda forbids it and takes him to their dining room. Barbara antagonizes everyone at the dinner table, peaking when she accuses Catherine of killing Johannes from being the last person with him. Catherine collapses, which reveals she's had a heart problem since she was a child. Barbara just sees it as attention-seeking behavior, and Magda says to her dead husband Catherine isn't guilty.

Chris rummages through the bedroom for any alarming finds, eventually seeing a revolver in a drawer under a nightgown. Chris hears a noise outside and investigates, passing by the study, which is shown to have its lights on and movement inside. At the barn, he sees Barbara and Günther are having an affair. The next morning, Magda lets Chris into the study when he tries to sneak in. Meanwhile, Inspector Huber is reading through the family finances, where he determines Johannes feared he was in danger and thus took out the policy before he was murdered. The painting of Johannes, showing with a suit and cane, resembles an unseen figure near the mansion the night before. On a horseback ride, Barbara offers Chris information on Johannes' murder at a late night meeting in the barn. After Chris kisses Catherine in her bed while she sleeps, which results in Magda making him leave for her to rest, Chris sees Barbara in the barn naked and wanting sex. Chris agrees, and Günther watches them through the window.

Sybil looks out of a window and sees in the nearby woods Barbara lying dead, completely nude and with her throat slashed. A button is found in her hand, which Chris says is from Günther's jacket. The man following Catherine again appears at Barbara's funeral at the church. Catherine has enough and gets Chris to follow him with her in their own car when the man drives away, but they lose him at a road exit. Magda sits in Johannes' study, starting at his portrait while playing orchestral music on a record and getting steadily drunk. She speaks to the portrait and twirls to "dance with" Johannes, when Chris and Catherine return. When Magda drinks a final glass to toast Barbara, she collapses. The lights go out, and when Sybil goes to check the fuse box, her throat is slashed with a straight razor by an unseen assailant. Günther then swings at Chris with a straight razor, before Chris knocks him out and the lights come back on.

Günther is arrested under presumption of him being the killer, except for in Johannes' murder. Inspector Huber reveals they haven't found information on Johannes' past around the time of World War II and before then, assuming he changed his name for what he fears are more unscrupulous reasons and Magda might have some information on that. Huber also insinuates the family killed Johannes for his policy. The man who followed Catherine appears, revealing him as a police sergeant. As Chris tries to settle Catherine's nerves, another call comes in. A woman on the line plays a tape of a man's whispered voice, saying time is running short to reveal her father's killer, causing her to pass out again.

The doctor treats Catherine and puts her to bed, instructing she needs to be woken up later. With Magda alone with Chris and getting them to drink together, she admits she doesn't care that Catherine is near death. When they get extremely drunk, they decide to see Catherine, who's not in her bed. Unfazed, Chris and Magda kiss, right when Catherine walks in on them. They put her to bed, and Chris stumbles into a bathroom, seemingly sick. At the theme park, Kirsty eventually meets with a rollercoaster operator, Tony, who's her mister outside of her marriage. She's upset Chris isn't rich enough for her to leave work at the restaurant and to be with Tony, but she says that'll change soon. All the while, the same man with the suit and cane followed her to her meeting.

A storm cuts the lights in the mansion again. When Magda goes outside from hearing footsteps, she sees who appears to be Johannes. The figure chases her slowly through the house, and every time Magda opens a door, she flashes back to that fatal night in Berlin. She goes to the balcony, and when cornered by Johannes, she professes she doesn't deserve to be punished for his crimes and the family's misfortunes. When Johannes tries to swing his cane at her, she stumbles back into a railing Huber pointed out was loose earlier. The railing gives, and Magda plummets to her death on the driveway below.

The "Johannes" decoy takes off his disguise as he drinks in front of Johannes' portrait. The imposter and killer is revealed as Chris, who was the boy in Berlin targeted with the time bomb. Johannes was his stepfather, who left his mother for Magda and tried to kill Chris and his mother with Magda's complicity to erase his past. However, only Chris' mother died in the blast, so he came back for Johannes and his family for revenge. He tracked down Johannes and forced him to take out the life insurance policy for a bribe, then left his body in the Tunnel of Horrors, one of his many setups as a distraction of the investigation. He provoked Günther into murdering Barbara and Sybil by sleeping with Barbara, then scared Magda off the balcony. But Kirsty was Johannes' killer, his partner in crime who was promised a cut of the insurance policy.

Catherine stumbles downstairs, shocked by Chris' guilt, down to his phone calls to her and breaking into her townhouse to worsen her heart condition. Furious she fell in love with him, she points her revolver at him and keeps firing. However, Chris loaded it with blanks, and Catherine's stress kills her with a fatal heart attack. Chris and Kirsty meet in the Tunnel of Horrors so she gets her payment, but when she doesn't get all she wants, Kirsty shoots Chris dead. The ride stops, revealing Huber and Chris' colleague, the man with the suit and cane who followed the couple, originally because he wanted to best Chris but then caught onto his plan. Kirsty gets out of the ride and runs out an emergency exit, with the cops in hot pursuit. She gives Tony the gun and runs under the rollercoaster tracks. Her leg gets caught when the controls shift the tracks' course, and, despite Tony tying to shift the controls back, an approaching tram comes and smashes into Kirsty. Chris arrives from the ride in a tram car, shown with a gunshot in his temple.

== Cast ==
- Robert Hoffmann as Chris Buyer
- Irina Demick as Magda Wallenberger
- Pilar Velázquez as Catherine Wallenberger
- Howard Ross as Günther
- Patrizia Adiutori as Barbara Wallenberger
- Adolfo Celi as Inspector Huber
- Philippe Leroy as Martin
- Teresa Gimpera as Kirsty Buyer (uncredited)
- Franco Ressel as Bruno (uncredited)
- María Vico as Sybil (uncredited)
