= The She-Wolves =

1957 film

- Directed by: Luis Saslavsky
- Written by: Luis Saslavsky; Pierre Boileau; Thomas Narcejac
- Based on: The She-Wolves by Pierre Boileau and Thomas Narcejac
- Produced by: Adolphe Osso
- Starring: François Périer; Micheline Presle; Jeanne Moreau
- Cinematography: Robert Juillard
- Edited by: Marinette Cadix
- Music by: Joseph Kosma
- Production company: Zodiaque Productions
- Distributed by: Les Films Fernand Rivers
- Release date: 26 April 1957
- Running time: 101 minutes
- Country: France
- Language: French

The She-Wolves (French: Les louves) is a 1957 French film noir drama film directed by Luis Saslavsky and starring François Périer, Micheline Presle and Jeanne Moreau. It is based on the novel of the same title by Pierre Boileau and Thomas Narcejac. It was shot at the Epinay Studios in Paris. The film's sets were designed by the art director Robert Bouladoux. It is also known by the alternative title Demoniac. It was also remade in 1985 as a TV movie in a joint British/French production for Channel 4, titled "Letters To An Unknown Lover", starring Cherie Lunghi and Mathilda May.

== Cast ==
- François Périer as Gervais Larauch / Bernard Pradal
- Micheline Presle as Hélène Vanaux
- Jeanne Moreau as Agnès Vanaux
- Madeleine Robinson as Julia Pradal
- Marc Cassot as Bernard Pradal
- Pierre Mondy as André Vilsan
- Paul Faivre as Le docteur Jaume
- Louis Arbessier as Le commissaire de police Drouin
- Simone Angèle as Eulalie - le patronne de l'auberge
- Jo Peignot as Le pharmacien
- Clément Harari as Le préparateur en pharmacie
- Jacques Morlaine as Un inspecteur de police
- Andrée Tainsy as La vendeuse de cartes de visite

== Bibliography ==
- Curti, Roberto. (2022) Italian Giallo in Film and Television: A Critical History. McFarland. p. 53.
- Goble, Alan. (1999) The Complete Index to Literary Sources in Film. Walter de Gruyter p. 46.
- Parish, James Robert. (1977) Film Actors Guide: Western Europe. Scarecrow Press. p. 932.
- Vest, James M. (2003) Hitchcock and France: The Forging of an Auteur. Bloomsbury Academic. p. 127.
