= Prudence and the Pill =

1968 British film by Fielder Cook

- Film poster
- Directed by: Fielder Cook; Ronald Neame (uncredited)
- Written by: Hugh Mills
- Produced by: Kenneth Harper; Ronald J. Kahn
- Starring: Deborah Kerr; David Niven
- Cinematography: Ted Moore
- Edited by: Norman Savage
- Music by: Bernard Ebbinghouse
- Distributed by: Twentieth Century-Fox
- Release date: 23 May 1968
- Running time: 92 minutes
- Country: United Kingdom
- Language: English
- Budget: $3,570,000
- Box office: $4,500,000 (US/ Canada)

Prudence and the Pill is a 1968 British comedy film made by Twentieth Century-Fox. It was directed by Fielder Cook and Ronald Neame and produced by Kenneth Harper and Ronald J. Kahn from a screenplay by Hugh Mills, based on his 1965 novel. The music score was by Bernard Ebbinghouse and the cinematography by Ted Moore.

The film stars Deborah Kerr and David Niven with Robert Coote, Irina Demick, Joyce Redman, Judy Geeson, Keith Michell, Michael Hordern and Edith Evans.

Hayley Mills was originally announced for the part eventually filled by Geeson. Mills had previously co-starred with Kerr and Evans in The Chalk Garden (1964), which was also directed by Neame.

== Plot ==
The film portrays the conflicting and comical attempts by five couples to avoid pregnancy by using contraceptive pills. All of their efforts are ultimately unsuccessful, with the result that all five of the women give birth the following year.

The story revolves around a wealthy London banker named Gerald Hardcastle and his wife Prudence, who live together unhappily, sleeping in separate bedrooms and speaking to each other only when necessary. The five couples in the film are (1) Gerald and his French mistress Elizabeth, or "Liz", (2) Prudence and her doctor, Dr. Alan Huart, (3) the Hardcastles' maid Rose and their chauffeur Ted, (4) Gerald's brother Henry and his wife Grace, and (5) Henry's and Grace's daughter Geraldine and her beau Tony Bates.

All of the couples want to use a birth control pill called "Thenol", but none of them wants to admit it. Prudence, Grace, and Ted manage to acquire supplies of pills, Grace through a prescription written by Huart, and Ted from the local chemist, or pharmacist, who happens to be a friend of his. However, Grace soon becomes pregnant, because Geraldine has been stealing her pills and replacing them with aspirin tablets. After Geraldine admits her pill-switching scheme to Grace and Grace tells Gerald about it, Gerald uses the scheme on Prudence to generate incriminating evidence of her affair.

Meanwhile, believing that Rose is too conservative to accept contraception, Ted puts his tablets in a vitamin bottle and tells her she needs them for her health. However, Rose is worried about becoming pregnant, so she switches the pills in her vitamin bottle with the pills in Prudence's Thenol bottle, just moments after Gerald replaces Prudence's Thenol with aspirin. The result, then, is that Rose unwittingly trades Ted's Thenol for Gerald's aspirin. She soon becomes pregnant, and Ted tells Gerald about the pills he gave her, but says nothing about telling her they were vitamins. When Gerald asks her why her Thenol pills failed to work, she asks him how he knew about them, thinking that he has already found out about her taking Prudence's pills, at which point they both realise that she has revealed her guilt.

Now knowing why Prudence is still not pregnant, Gerald buys more aspirin, determined to expose her relationship with Huart. This eventually works, as do whatever measures Grace took to keep her pills away from Geraldine. By the end of the film, Geraldine and Prudence are both expecting.

Eventually, Gerald gets into trouble with both Liz and Prudence. Liz grows dissatisfied in her covert relationship with Gerald, who has been hiding her from his family, and decides to leave him. Prudence finds the letter that Liz wrote to Gerald about her decision, and Gerald finds Huart's Thenol prescription for Prudence. At first, neither Gerald nor Prudence is willing to grant the other a divorce, but Prudence offers to take the blame after becoming pregnant, as long as Gerald will spare Huart's reputation. Gerald accepts this arrangement grudgingly, but before meeting with Huart, he happens to see Liz while driving through town, and she tells him she is going to have his baby. Now able to see her openly, and with a child on the way, Gerald quickly and enthusiastically agrees to an amicable divorce. A few months later, a total of six newborn babies arrive, Rose having had twins.

== Cast ==
Actor	Role
Deborah Kerr	Prudence Hardcastle
David Niven	Gerald Hardcastle
Robert Coote	Henry Hardcastle
Irina Demick	Elizabeth Brett
Joyce Redman	Grace Hardcastle
Judy Geeson	Geraldine Hardcastle
Keith Michell	Dr. Alan Huart
Edith Evans	Lady Roberta Bates
David Dundas	Tony Bates
Vickery Turner	Rose the maid
Hugh Armstrong	Ted the chauffeur
Peter Butterworth	chemist
Moyra Fraser	woman in tea shop
Annette Kerr	Gerald's secretary
Harry Towb	racetrack official
Jonathan Lynn	chemist's assistant
Michael Hordern (uncredited)	Dr. Morley

== Production ==
Filming took place in Oxfordshire, London, Buckinghamshire, Tweseldown race course in Hampshire, and Brands Hatch in Kent, which shows period racing cars of the day in colour and a tyre change in the pits.

== Reception ==
=== Box office ===
According to Fox records the film required $6,425,000 in rentals to break even and by 11 December 1970 had made $7,175,000. In September 1970 Fox reported it had made a profit on the film of $513,000.

=== Critical ===
The Monthly Film Bulletin wrote: "The only achievement of this dismal and unamusing comedy – completed by Ronald Neame after Fielder Cook overran his schedule – is that it manages to skirt the subject of contraception for ninety-two minutes without ever once generating any genuine sexiness or human sympathy. Its pseudomodernity is reflected in the pastiche Victorian Valentines of Richard Williams' title designs and in its inaccurate premise that the pill is available only to married women; and since each of its emancipated heroines manages – the pill notwithstanding – to get speedily pregnant, its portrayal of the new morality is unlikely to influence old-fashioned advocates of self-control."
