= Brigade antigangs =

- Directed by: Bernard Borderie
- Written by: Auguste Le Breton; Francis Cosne; Bernard Borderie
- Produced by: Francis Cosne
- Starring: Robert Hossein; Raymond Pellegrin; Gabriele Tinti
- Cinematography: Henri Persin
- Music by: Michel Magne
- Release date: 19 August 1966
- Running time: 95 minutes
- Countries: France; Italy
- Language: French

Brigade antigangs is a 1966 French-Italian film directed by Bernard Borderie.

== Synopsis ==
Restaurateur Sartet is investigated over being behind a great many robberies.

When a special task force known as Brigade antigangs under the helm of chief inspector Le Goff catches him red-handed, he has just secretly provided his sister with access to his booty.

Sartet's sister invests the booty in hiring henchmen who are supposed to free Sartet. They eventually kidnap Le Goff's brother who happens to be a famous footballer. The chief inspector is informed his brother is about to die unless the police releases Sartet.

== Cast ==
- Robert Hossein: chief inspector Le Goff
- Raymond Pellegrin: Robert Sartet
- Gabriele Tinti: Jobic Le Goff
- Pierre Clementi: Trois-Pommes
- Amidou: Nez Cassé ("Broken Nose")
- Ilaria Occhini: Angèle Le Goff
- Michel Galabru: Larmeno
- Patrick Préjean: Beau Môme
- Germaine Delbat: Madame Le Goff
- Michel Tureau: Le Bosco

== See also ==
- The Sicilian Clan (1969) - based on another book of the same series
