= Stunt Squad =

- Directed by: Domenico Paolella
- Written by: Dardano Sacchetti; Domenico Paolella
- Starring: Marcel Bozzuffi; Riccardo Salvino; Vittorio Mezzogiorno
- Cinematography: Marcello Magliocchi
- Music by: Stelvio Cipriani
- Release date: 28 July 1977
- Country: Italy
- Language: Italian

La polizia è sconfitta (internationally titled Stunt Squad and Elimination Force) is a 1977 Italian poliziottesco film directed by Domenico Paolella. The character of Valli, played by Vittorio Mezzogiorno, was defined as "perhaps the most gruesome and ruthless villain of the Italian crime cinema."

== Plot ==
A tough police inspector forms a special squad of motorcycle cops in order to track down a psychotic racketeer and his gang.

== Cast ==
- Marcel Bozzuffi as Inspector Grifi
- Riccardo Salvino as Agent Brogi
- Vittorio Mezzogiorno as Valli
- Claudia Giannotti as Anna
- Francesco Ferracini as Platania
- Pasquale Basile as Marshall Marchetti
- Nello Pazzafini as the Tunisian
- Alfredo Zammi as Giovanni Corsi
- Andrea Aureli as Giovanni, the Bar Owner

== See also ==
- List of Italian films of 1977
