= Riccardo Salvino =

Italian film and television actor (1944–1999)

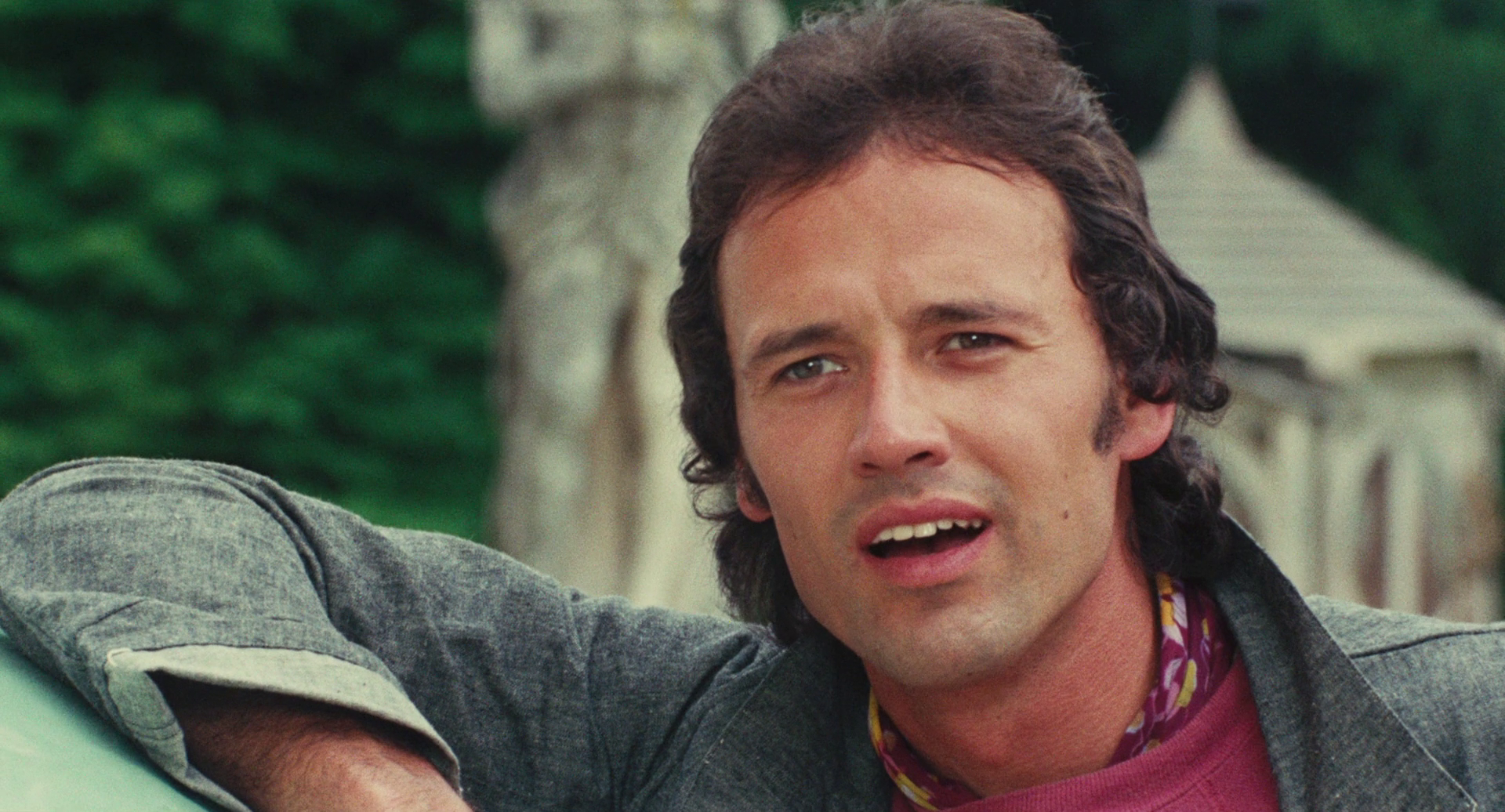
- Salvino in Your Vice Is a Locked Room and Only I Have the Key (1972)
- Born: 29 March 1944; Palermo, Italy
- Died: 12 January 1999 (aged 54); Rome, Italy
- Occupation: actor
- Years active: 1969–1999

Riccardo Salvino (29 March 1944 – 12 January 1999) was an Italian film and television actor.

== Life and career ==
Born in Palermo, Salvino made his film debut at 23 years old, with a main role in Franco De Rosis' Il magnaccio. In the 1970s he was very active in genre films, often in main roles. In the 1980s he focused his activities on television, appearing in a number of series and television films of some success. He died in Rome on 12 January 1999, at the age of 54.

== Partial filmography ==
- Il magnaccio (1969) - Sergio Venturi
- Probabilità zero (1969) - Hans Liedholm
- Rangers: attacco ora X (1970) - Lieutenant Porter
- A Sword for Brando (1970) - Robin Hood
- The Lonely Violent Beach (1971) - Jonathan
- The Legend of Frenchie King (1971) - Jean (uncredited)
- Winged Devils (1972) - Lt. Gianni Orlando
- Your Vice Is a Locked Room and Only I Have the Key (1972) - Dario
- Halleluja to Vera Cruz (1973) - John the Timid
- Un modo di essere donna (1973) - Fabrizio
- Madeleine, anatomia di un incubo (1974) - Luis
- Swept Away (1974) - Signor Pavone Lanzetti
- Death Will Have Your Eyes (1974) - Stefano
- Colt 38 Special Squad (1976) - Nicola Silvestri
- The Probability Factor (1976) - Robert
- Nick the Sting (1976) - Mark
- Emanuelle in America (1977) - Bill
- Camouflage (1977) - Italian
- Ladies' Doctor (1977) - Filippo
- Stunt Squad (1977) - Agent Brogi
- The Assisi Underground (1985) - Otto Maionica
- The Belt (1989) - Professor Achille Biondelli
