= Irina Demick =

French actress (1936–2004)

- Irina Demick in 1964
- Born: Irina Dziemiach; 16 October 1936; Pommeuse, Seine-et-Marne, France
- Died: 8 October 2004 (aged 67); Indianapolis, Indiana, U.S.
- Occupation: Actress
- Years active: 1959–1972
- Spouse: Philippe Wahl (m. 1964; div. 1979)

Irina Demick (16 October 1936 – 8 October 2004), sometimes credited as Irina Demich or Irina Demik, was a French actress who had a brief career in American films.

== Biography ==
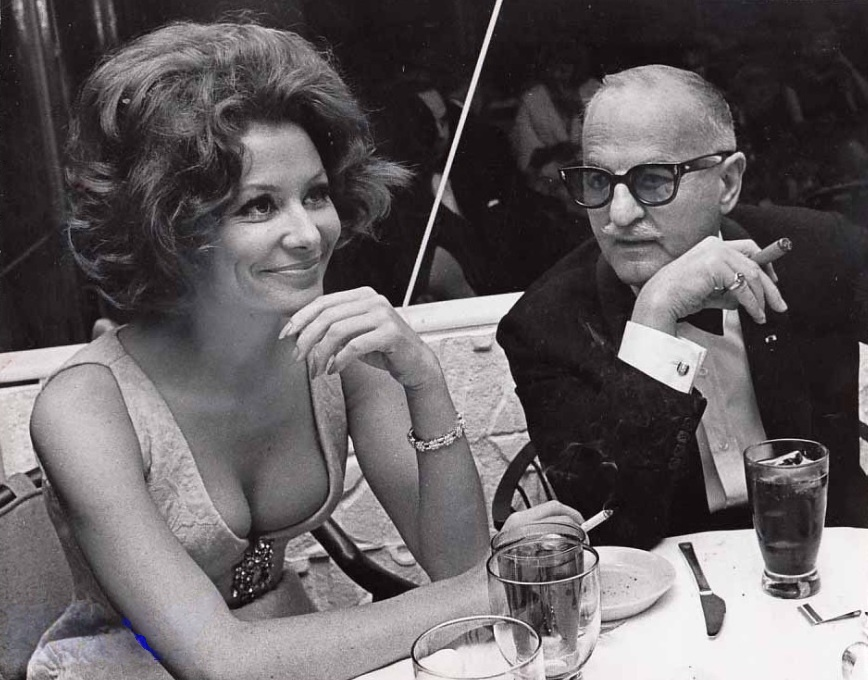
Demick with Darryl F. Zanuck in 1964

Born Irina Dziemiach, of Russian ancestry, in Pommeuse, Seine-et-Marne, she went to Paris and became a model. She made an appearance in a French film Julie la rousse (1959) and met producer Darryl F. Zanuck and became his mistress. Zanuck cast Demick in his epic production The Longest Day (1962) as a French resistance fighter; Zanuck had a long history of trying to turn his European mistresses into film stars by casting them in featured roles in films produced by him – he had previously done this with Bella Darvi (in The Egyptian) and Juliette Gréco (in The Sun Also Rises), and would later do this with Genevieve Gilles (in Hello-Goodbye).

Demick's career continued with roles in OSS se déchaîne (1963), The Visit (1964), Un monsieur de compagnie (1964) and Up from the Beach (1965). In 1965, she played in La Métamorphose des cloportes, and six roles in Those Magnificent Men in Their Flying Machines, each one a different nationality.

After making a few more films including Prudence and the Pill (1968) and Le Clan des Siciliens (The Sicilian Clan, 1969), and two Italian horror films in 1972, Demick's career faded and came to a standstill.

In 1964, she married Philippe Wahl, a Swiss entrepreneur. Together they lived in Rome and Paris. After her divorce in 1979, she moved to the U.S. She died in Indianapolis, Indiana of breast cancer.

== Selected filmography ==
- Julie the Redhead (1959)
- The Longest Day (1962) as Janine Boitard
- OSS se déchaîne (1963) as Lucia
- The Visit (1964) as Anya
- Un monsieur de compagnie (1964) as Nicole
- Up from the Beach (1965) as Lili Rolland
- Those Magnificent Men in Their Flying Machines (1965) as Brigitte / Ingrid / Marlene / Françoise / Yvette / Betty
- La Métamorphose des cloportes (1965) as Catherine Verdier
- Once a Greek (1966) as Chloé Saloniki
- Tiffany Memorandum (1967) as Sylvie Meynard
- Prudence and the Pill (1968) as Elizabeth Brett
- La porta del cannone (1969) as Rada Kálmán
- The Archangel (1969) as Sig.ra Taroochi Roda
- The Sicilian Clan (1969) as Jeanne Manalese
- The Females (1970) as Anna
- Quella chiara notte d'ottobre (1970)
- Goya, a Story of Solitude (1971) as Duchess d'Alba
- Naked Girl Killed in the Park (1972) as Magda Wallenberger
- Tragic Ceremony (1972) as Bill's mother (final film role)
