= La Horse =

- Directed by: Pierre Granier-Deferre
- Screenplay by: Pascal Jardin; Pierre Granier-Deferre
- Based on: La Horse by Georges Godefroy
- Starring: Jean Gabin
- Cinematography: Walter Wottitz
- Edited by: Jean Ravel
- Music by: Serge Gainsbourg; Jean-Claude Vannier
- Production companies: Société nouvelle de cinématographie; PAC; Gafer; Romana Film; Roxy-Film
- Release dates: February 22, 1970 (France); May 6, 1970 (Italy); June 19, 1970 (West Germany)
- Running time: 90 minutes
- Countries: France; Italy; West Germany
- Budget: 3.5 million francs

La Horse (Italian: Il Clan degli uomini violenti, German: Der Erbarmungslose) is a 1970 French-language thriller directed by Pierre Granier-Deferre and based on Michel Lambesc's novel of the same name.

== Plot ==
In Normandy, the widower Auguste Maroilleur rules his family and his farm with an iron hand. Bien Phu, a disabled veteran of the war in Indochina, is a valued employee. Out shooting duck, Auguste and Bien Phu discover a huge cache of heroin. Auguste deduces that his grandson Henri, whose vacation job is on a ship, must be a courier. He destroys the drug, worth millions, and confines Henri to a cellar. When the gangsters cannot find their man or their merchandise, they try to destroy Auguste's livelihood and peace of mind. They burn a barn, brutally kill his cattle and rape his virgin granddaughter. He and Bien Phu fight back, eventually killing all five villains by shotgun and grenade. This private war does not go unnoticed and the police bring the whole family in for questioning. Following Auguste's orders, none of them give a thing away and all are released.

== Cast ==
- Jean Gabin as Auguste Maroilleur, farm owner
- Marc Porel as Henri, Auguste's grandson
- Danièle Ajoret as Louise, younger daughter of Auguste
- Michel Barbey as Maurice, husband of Louise
- Christian Barbier as Léon, husband of Mathilde
- Pierre Dux as the investigating magistrate
- Armando Francioli as Francis Grutti, a gangster
- Julien Guiomar as the police inspector
- Eléonore Hirt as Mathilde, elder daughter of Auguste
- Reinhard Kolldehoff as Hans, a drug baron
- Astrid Frank as girlfriend of Hans
- Félix Marten as Marc, a gangster
- Orlane Paquin as Véronique, granddaughter of Auguste
- André Weber as Bien-Phu, farm worker
- Henri Attal as Louis, a gangster
- Dominique Zardi as Tony, a gangster
- Albert Delpy as A journalist

== Production ==
La Horse was a co-production between the Paris based companies Société nouvelle de cinématographie and P.A.C and Fager, the Rome-based Romana Film, and the Munich-based Roxy-Film. Its script was based on the 1968 novel published in the Série Noire collection by Michel Lambesc under the pen name of Georges Godefroy.

Filming lasted from October 20 to November 29, 1969 with a budget of 3.5 million francs.

Serge Gainsbourg partnered with Jean-Claude Vannier for the films score in January 1970. The two had already previously worked together on three previous films. The duoe first proposed a theme based on African percussion for the credits.

== Release ==
La Horse was released in France on February 22, 1970. In France, it had 2,113,540 admission which had it reach 17th place on the annual box office of the year. It was later screened in Italy as Il clan degli uomini violenti on May 6, 1970 and in West Germany as Der Erbarmunglose on June 19, 1970.

La Horse was not released widely overseas, but received a few screenings in 1978 as part of a French Film Festival organized by the French Embassy. It was shown at Purdue University in the United States on October 7, 1978 as part of a French Film Festival.

=== Remake ===
In 2005, La Horse was remade as Joseph a television film directed by Marc Angelo. Initially in that film, Jean-Paul Belmondo was supposed to play the role of the patriarch, but suffered from a stroke which led him not to be in the film.

== See also ==
- Jean Gabin filmography
- List of French films of 1970
