= Girl in the Window =

- Directed by: Luciano Emmer
- Written by: Luciano Emmer; Pier Paolo Pasolini; Emanuele Cassuto; Luciano Martino; Vincenzo Marinucci; Rodolfo Sonego
- Starring: Lino Ventura; Magali Noël
- Cinematography: Otello Martelli
- Music by: Roman Vlad
- Release date: 1961
- Language: Italian

Girl in the Window (Italian: La ragazza in vetrina, French: La fille dans la vitrine) is a 1961 Italian-French drama film written and directed by Luciano Emmer and starring Lino Ventura and Magali Noël. It is based on the novel by Giovanni Comisso.

== Plot ==
A group of boys from Italy arrives in the Netherlands to work for a local mining company. One of the miners Frederico takes one of the boys (Vincenzo) under his wings. During their first day at the mines an accident occurs. The miners are buried for several days.

After they come free Vincenzo wants to finish his job but Frederico persuades him to join one last hang out and fun bar tour. They come around and end up in a red light spot with different girls in windows presenting themselves as prostitutes. One of the girls (Chanel) is an old flame of Frederico. The boy Vincenzo is interested in another girl (Elsa). He paid her to spend with him the night. Meanwhile, is Francesco drunk. He convince Chanel to go with him for a trip. He want to spend time with her at the Sea. Vincenzo after he spent the night with the prostitute Else wake up too late and misses his train back to Italy. Now he convince Elsa to follow Frederico and Chanel to the Sea.

During their time at Sea comes to some argue between Vincenzo and Frederico. Frederico had some boat trip with Elsa. Vincenzo went jealous about it and they argue. After some for and back Elsa and Vincenzo fall in love and Vincenzo decided to stay and continue his work at the mines. He is in love with Elsa and wants to marry her. In the end scene, Frederico and Vincenzo are back at the mines and friends again. Vincenzo tells Frederico about his plans to marry Elsa. Frederico response that he will marry Chanel too and they will have a double wedding ceremony.

== Cast ==
- Lino Ventura as Federico
- Magali Noël as Cori
- Bernard Fresson as Vincenzo
- Marina Vlady as Else
- Salvatore Lombardo
- Antonio Badas
- Peter Faber
- Roger Bernard
