= Walter Wottitz =

French cinematographer (1912-1986)

- Born: June 22, 1912; Thessaloniki, Greece
- Died: November 1, 1986 (aged 74); Bry-sur-Marne, Île-de-France, France
- Occupation: Cinematographer

Walter Wottitz (June 22, 1912 – November 1, 1986) was a French cinematographer. He won an Academy Award for Best Cinematography for his work on The Longest Day (1962).

== Life and career ==
Born in Thessaloniki, Greece, Wottitz began his cinematography career in the late 1930's, working for director Christian-Jaque. He worked for several prominent directors in French cinema, including Marcel Pagnol, Claude Sautet, Jean-Pierre Melville, and Pierre Granier-Deferre.

Wottitz (along with Jean Bourgoin) shot the 1962 World War II epic The Longest Day for 20th Century Fox, which earned them an Academy Award for Best Cinematography (Black-and-White) and a Golden Globe Award for Best Cinematography (Black-and-White). His other American film credits included The Train (1964) and Up from the Beach (1965), both shot in France.

Wottitz died on November 1, 1986, at the age of 74.

== Partial filmography ==
- No Love Allowed (1942)
- Naïs (1945)
- That's Not the Way to Die (1946)
- Paris Precinct (1955)
- Honoré de Marseille (1956)
- Patrouille de choc (1957)
- Love Is at Stake (1957)
- Certains l'aiment froide (1960)
- Tartarin of Tarascon (1962)
- The Longest Day (1962)
- D'où viens-tu Johnny? (1963)
- The Train (1964)
- Up from the Beach (1965)
- The Dictator's Guns (1965)
- God's Thunder (1965)
- The Upper Hand (1966)
- The Gardener of Argenteuil (1966)
- Action Man (1967)
- 24 Hours in the Life of a Woman (1968)
- Under the Sign of the Bull (1969)
- Army of Shadows (1969)
- La Horse (1970)
- The Widow Couderc (1971)
- The Train (1973)
- Un flic (1972)
- Creezy (1974)
- Bons Baisers de Hong Kong (1975)
- The Passengers (1977)

== Awards and nominations ==
Year	Award	Category	Work	Result	Ref.
1963	Academy Award	Best Cinematography (Black-and-White)	The Longest Day	Won	
1963	Golden Globe Award	Best Cinematography (Black-and-White)	The Longest Day	Won	
