= Marcel Bozzuffi =

French actor (1929–1988)

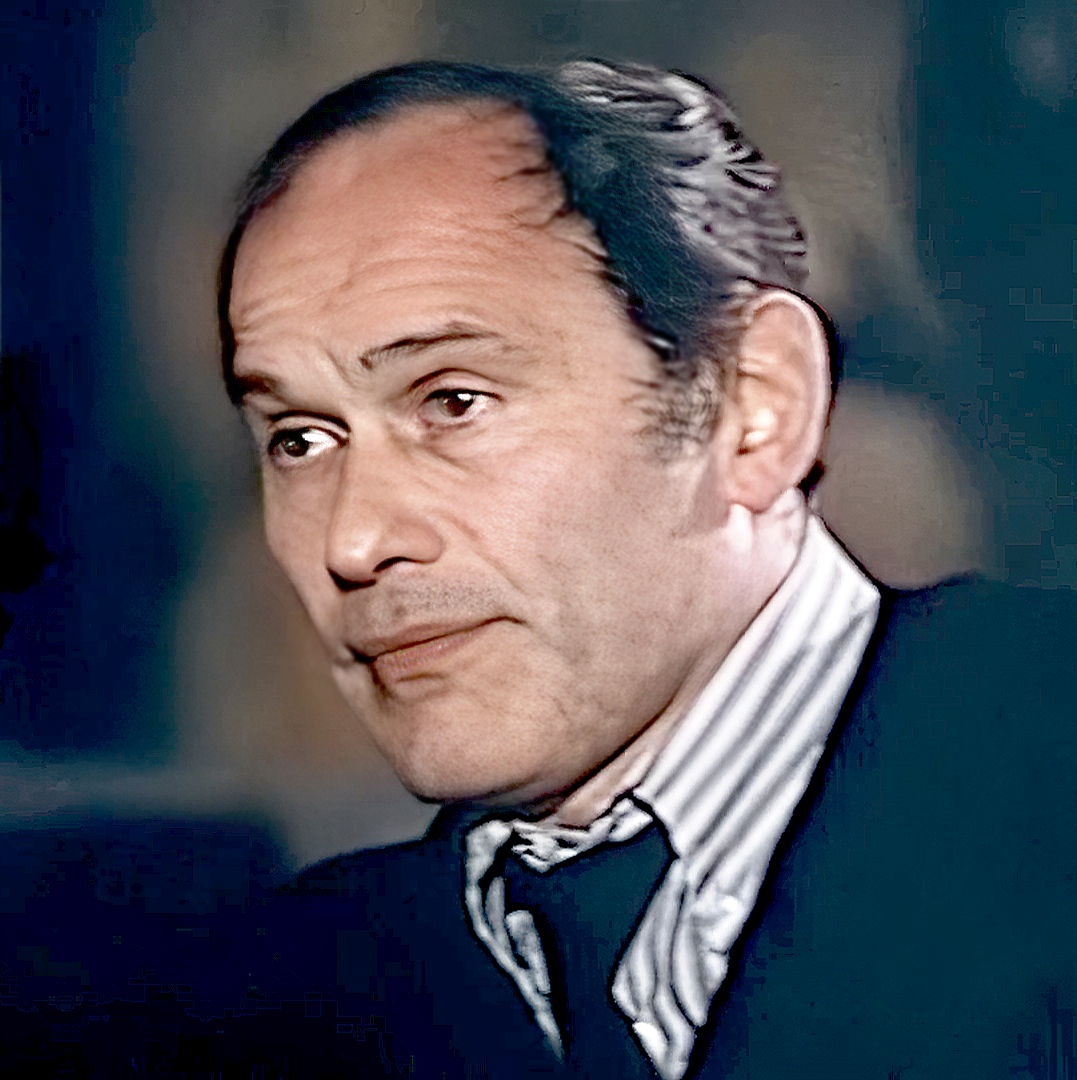
- Photo of Marcel Bozzuffi-Italie
- Born: 28 October 1929; Rennes, Ille-et-Vilaine, France
- Died: 1 February 1988 (aged 58); Paris, France
- Resting place: Montparnasse Cemetery
- Occupation: Actor
- Spouse: Françoise Fabian

Marcel Bozzuffi (28 October 1929 – 1 February 1988) was a French film actor. Internationally, he appeared as a hitman in the Oscar-winning American film The French Connection. In 1963, he married French actress Françoise Fabian.

According to producer Philip D'Antoni, Bozzuffi began his career doing stunts in France and performed the difficult backwards fall down the elevated railway steps himself. He later became a director and supplied the dubbed voices for Charles Bronson and Paul Newman.

== Selected filmography ==
- 1955: Caroline and the Rebels as Un Soldat (uncredited)
- 1955: Razzia sur la chnouf as Le Client au Révolver (uncredited)
- 1955: Blackmail as Un Accusé
- 1955: Gas-Oil as Pierrot Ragondin
- 1955: La Meilleure Part
- 1956: La Bande à papa as La Volaille
- 1956: The Wages of Sin
- 1956: Le Pays d'où je viens as Le chauffeur du camion
- 1957: Reproduction interdite as Bernard
- 1957: Le rouge est mis as Pierre
- 1957: Escapade as Raymond
- 1958: Le Sicilien as Pete
- 1959: Asphalte as Gino
- 1960: Le Caïd as Toni
- 1961: The Sahara Is Burning as Gomez
- 1961: Tintin and the Golden Fleece (Tintin et le Mystère de la Toison d'or) as Angorapoulos
- 1963: The Day and the Hour (Le jour et l'heure) as Inspector Lerat
- 1963: Maigret Sees Red as Torrence
- 1965: Heaven on One's Head (Le Ciel sur la tête) as Captain
- 1965: The Sleeping Car Murders (Compartiment tueurs) as Un Agent de Police (uncredited)
- 1966: The Upper Hand as Marque Mal
- 1966: Le deuxième souffle as Jo Ricci
- 1968: Béru et ces dames as Francis
- 1969: Life Love Death (La Vie, l'Amour, la Mort) as Le Commissaire Marchand
- 1969: Z as Vago
- 1969: L'Américain as Jacky
- 1969: Love Is a Funny Thing (Un homme qui me plaît) as Le mari de Françoise
- 1970: Le Temps des loups as Marco / Sidekick
- 1970: Vertige pour un tueur as Marc
- 1970: The Lady in the Car with Glasses and a Gun as Manuel
- 1970: Crepa padrone, crepa tranquillo
- 1971: Comptes à rebours as Zampa
- 1971: The French Connection as Pierre "Frog Two" Nicoli
- 1971: Daisy Town as Lucky Luke (voice)
- 1972: Images as Rene
- 1972: Trois milliards sans ascenseur as Gus
- 1972: Black Turin (Torino nera) as Fridda
- 1973: Le Fils as Marcel / Gunman
- 1973: Les Hommes as Félix Vinciguerra 'Vinci'
- 1973: Chino (The Valdez Horses) as Maral
- 1974: Hold-Up, instantánea de una corrupción as Steve Duggins
- 1974: Caravan to Vaccarès as Czerda
- 1974: The Marseille Contract as Calmet
- 1974: Drama of the Rich (Fatti di gente perbene) as Augusto Stanzani
- 1975: Go Gorilla Go
- 1975: Le Gitan as Policeman Blot
- 1975: Hallucination Strip (Roma drogata: la polizia non può intervenire) as Il Commissario De Stefani
- 1976: Illustrious Corpses (Cadaveri eccellenti) as The Lazy
- 1976: Colt 38 Special Squad (Quelli della calibro 38) as Inspector Vanni
- 1976: Rome: The Other Side of Violence as Carli
- 1977: Le Juge Fayard dit Le Shériff as Joanno dit Le Capitaine
- 1977: Stunt Squad (La polizia è sconfitta) as Grifi
- 1977: March or Die as Lieutenant Fontaine
- 1977: L'uomo di Corleone
- 1978: Safari Rally (6000 km di paura) as Paul Stark
- 1979: The Passage as Perea
- 1979: Bloodline as Man In Black
- 1979: Il cappotto di Astrakan as Commissario Juvet
- 1980: Contraband (Luca il contrabbandiere) as Francois Jacois, The Marsigliese
- 1980: La Cage aux Folles II as Broca
- 1982: Identification of a Woman (Identificazione di una donna) as Mario
- 1983: Le Cercle des passions as Turiddu Zangara
- 1983: Afghanistan pourquoi? as Colonel Russe
- 1984: To Catch a King as Colonel da Cunha
- 1984: Asphalt Warriors (L'Arbalète) as Falco
- 1986: Adiós pequeña as Fidel Arteche
- 1986: L'ogre as Paul Calmet
- 1988: Savannah as Caplan
- 1988: Giallo alla regola as Colonel Catalini
