= Hello-Goodbye (1970 film) =

1970 British film by Jean Negulesco

- Hello-Goodbye
- Directed by: Jean Negulesco
- Written by: Roger Marshall
- Produced by: André Hakim
- Starring: Michael Crawford; Genevieve Gilles; Curd Jürgens; Ira Furstenberg
- Cinematography: Henri Decaë
- Edited by: Richard Bryan
- Music by: Francis Lai
- Production company: Darryl F. Zanuck Productions
- Distributed by: 20th Century Fox
- Release date: 12 July 1970
- Running time: 107 min.
- Country: United Kingdom
- Language: English
- Budget: $4.4 million

Hello-Goodbye is a 1970 British comedy film starring Michael Crawford, and was the final film directed by Jean Negulesco.

== Plot ==
Harry England, a British car salesman on a trip to France, meets a Baroness, "Dany", when her Rolls-Royce breaks down. They spend a few days together and become lovers before she disappears one night, but Harry does not know her surname.

The Baron then hires Harry to teach his teenage son about cars on their country estate. Harry encounters the Baroness again and their affair continues. Harry falls in love and asks the Baroness to leave the Baron, who has taken up with a lady of his own . Dany refused to leave her husband. Harry drived Rolls-Royce car into the château's swimming pool and left the house . Harry knew that Dany left her husband and will go to America . Harry drived quickly to reach Dany before going to America.

== Cast ==
- Michael Crawford as Harry England
- Genevieve Gilles as Dany
- Curd Jürgens as Baron De Choisis
- Ira von Fürstenberg as Evelyne Rossan (credited as Ira Furstenberg)
- Lon Satton as Cole Strutter
- Peter Myers as Bentley
- Mike Marshall as Paul
- Didier Haudepin as Raymond
- Vivian Pickles as Joycie
- Agathe Natanson as Monique
- Georges Bever as the hotel porter
- Denise Grey as the concierge
- Jeffry Wickham as Dickie

== Production ==
Darryl F. Zanuck had a long history of trying to turn his European mistresses into film stars – he had previously done this with Bella Darvi, Juliette Gréco and Irina Demick. Hello Goodbye was created as a vehicle for Gilles, his latest mistress, and was the first production Zanuck personally supervised since he inserted Demick in The Longest Day (1962).

Filming started on the French Riviera under the direction of Ronald Neame. He quit the film after a few weeks due to disagreements with Zanunck. He was replaced by Jean Negulesco, who only did the movie as a favor to Zanuck.

== Box office ==
According to Fox records, the film required $7,225,000 in rentals to break even. It failed to do so; by 11 December 1970, the film had only made $2,335,000.
