= A Sword for Brando =

- Directed by: Alfio Caltabiano
- Written by: Alfio Caltabiano
- Produced by: Luigi Rovere
- Starring: Riccardo Salvino; Karin Schubert; Tano Cimarosa
- Cinematography: Aldo Giordani
- Edited by: Eugenio Alabiso
- Music by: Carlo Rustichelli
- Production company: Regalfilm
- Release date: 14 May 1970
- Running time: 94 minutes
- Country: Italy
- Language: Italian

A Sword for Brando (Italian: Una spada per Brando) is a 1970 Italian adventure film directed by Alfio Caltabiano and starring Riccardo Salvino, Karin Schubert and Tano Cimarosa.

== Cast ==
- Riccardo Salvino as Robin Hood
- Karin Schubert as Samanta
- Tano Cimarosa as Greedy friar
- Furio Meniconi as Tall friar
- Gérard Herter
- Sandro Dori as Fra' Gisippo
- Richard Watson
- Gianna Zingone
- Dante Maggio
- Consalvo Dell'Arti
- Paolo Magalotti
- Giorgio Dolfin
- Alfio Caltabiano as The Count
- Ivano Staccioli

== Bibliography ==
- Roberto Curti. Italian Crime Filmography, 1968-1980. McFarland, 2013.
