= Genevieve Gilles =

French actress

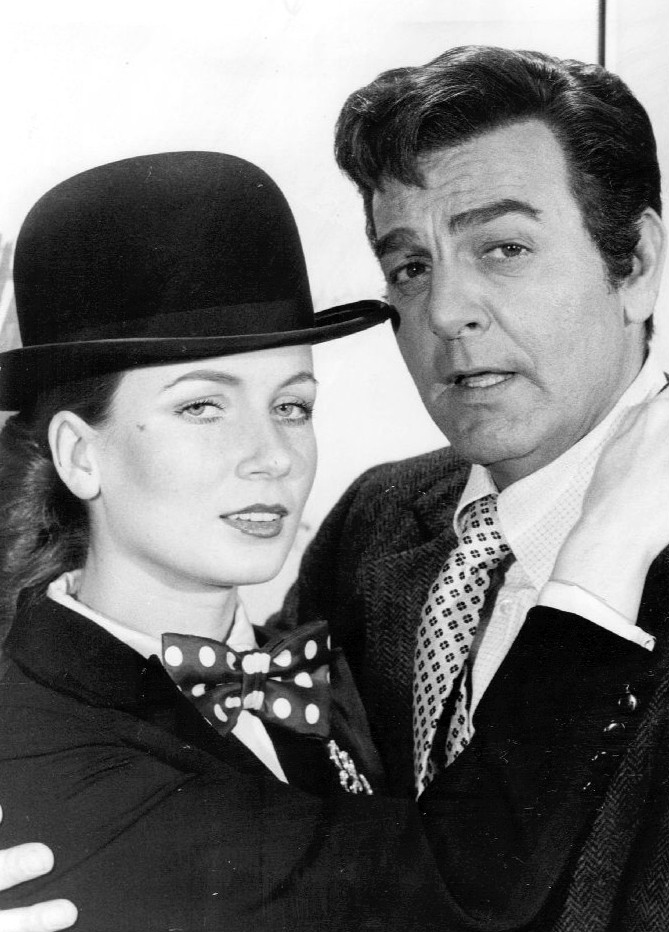
- Gilles with Mike Connors in Mannix, 1973
- Born: Geneviève Gillaizeau; 1946 (age 79–80); Paris, France
- Occupation: Actress
- Years active: 1969–1973

Geneviève Gilles (born Geneviève Gillaizeau; 1946) is a French-Romanian actress. Having acted in one film and three 1980s era sitcoms, she is best known for being the mistress of film producer Darryl F. Zanuck from 1965 to 1973, and for later suing Zanuck's estate in 1980.

In 1965, Gillaizeau met American film producer Darryl F. Zanuck, becoming his mistress from 1965 to 1973. Gillaizeau, who was 19 years old at the time, later said she found the 63-year-old Zanuck irresistible. She was quoted in 1980 as stating "... his age didn't bother me. He was wonderful, very powerful and smart. About sex, he was like Picasso, I think."

Gilles' only film, as the lead in Hello-Goodbye (1970), was created and written by Zanuck, and was the first production he personally supervised since The Longest Day (1962). Zanuck had a long history of trying to turn his European mistresses into film stars – he had previously done this with Bella Darvi (The Egyptian), Juliette Gréco (The Sun Also Rises) and Irina Demick (The Longest Day).

In 1980, Gilles filed a $15 million claim against the estate of Darryl F. Zanuck, claiming that Zanuck's son, Richard, influenced his father to remove her from his final will in October 1973. Darryl F. Zanuck had died in 1979, and was residing with his wife Virginia at the time. Zanuck family members countersued. Zanuck's will was settled on January 8, 1988, after Gilles provided that her claim on the estate would be given to Yeshiva University in New York. The university received a $50,000 payment.

== Filmography ==
- The World of Fashion (1969, Documentary short)
- Hello-Goodbye (1970) as Dany (Baroness)
- Mannix (1973, TV Series) as Genevieve – Episode: "Carol Lockwood, Past Tense"
