= The Lonely Violent Beach =

- Theatrical release poster
- Directed by: Ernesto Gastaldi
- Written by: Alberto Cardone; Ernesto Gastaldi; Vittorio Salerno
- Produced by: Armando Govoni
- Starring: Robert Hoffmann; Mara Maryl; Riccardo Salvino
- Cinematography: Benito Frattari
- Edited by: Attilio Vincioni
- Music by: Stelvio Cipriani
- Release date: 1971 (Italy)
- Country: Italy
- Languages: Italian; English

The Lonely Violent Beach (Italian: La lunga spiaggia fredda) is a 1971 crime thriller film directed by Ernesto Gastaldi and starring Robert Hoffmann, Mara Maryl and Riccardo Salvino.

== Plot ==
A couple in a troubled marriage drives to a house by the sea, however the couple soon attracts the attention of a nearby motorcycle gang who proceeds to target them.

== Cast ==
- Robert Hoffmann: Fred
- Mara Maryl: Jane
- Riccardo Salvino: Jonathan
- Joshua Sinclair: Thomas
- Walter Maestosi: Harry
- Fabian Cevallos: Speed

== Production ==
The film was shot in 25 days.

== Reception ==
The German site ItaloCinema gave the film 8 stars out of 10. The film is noted for its problematic ending.
