= Auguste Le Breton =

French novelist (1913–1999)

- Born: 18 February 1913; Lesneven, France
- Died: 31 May 1999 (aged 86); Saint-Germain-en-Laye, France
- Occupations: Novelist, screenwriter
- Writing career
- Genres: Fiction, crime

Auguste Le Breton (born Auguste Monfort; 18 February 1913 – 31 May 1999) was a Breton novelist who wrote primarily about the criminal underworld. His novels were adapted into several notable films of the 1950s, such as Rififi, Razzia sur la chnouf, Le rouge est mis and Le clan des siciliens. He wrote the dialogue for the noir film Bob le flambeur.

== Biography ==
Auguste Le Breton was born in Lesneven, Finistère, Brittany. His childhood name was Auguste Monfort. Tragedy struck early in his life. Before his birth, his father had died in the First World War. His mother then disappeared. Being an orphan, Le Breton acquired the status of ward of the nation and so was housed in state institutions. Growing up in these institutions wasn't easy. He got into trouble regularly. He had to be put in remand homes frequently. When he lived in Paris, his haunts were disreputable places of the capital, bars and gambling dens. He even spent time with the gangs of Montmartre, acquainting himself with the crime world. He himself, however, was never involved in any serious crime. There can be no doubt that this semi-criminal life of his had a vast influence on his writings, enlivening them with the accuracy that only experience can bring.

== Rebel and writer ==
For uncertain reasons, Le Breton joined the Resistance during the Second World War. It has been speculated that it was the Vichy's anti-gambling laws that made Le Breton turn against the regime. It is certain that he aided others involved in the Resistance to elude Vichy and the Germans. It was for such contributions that he was awarded the Croix de Guerre and the Resistance medal.

Involvement in the Resistance marked a metamorphosis in Le Breton's life. Perhaps spurred on by his selfless actions during the war, he began to write. A few years later he married, another pivotal point in his life. Le Breton stated that he would write books for children, if he had any. He planned to write a memoir of his life as an orphan, his rootless childhood, the life of penury and visiting disreputable places like bars and brothels.

== Autobiography ==
When Le Breton's daughter Mary-Yvonne was born, he lived up to his words and wrote his autobiography. Entitled Les Hauts Murs, the book was successful. It was a poignant book, filled with anecdotal episodes from Le Breton's time in the orphanages, remand homes and prisons. Le Breton described in detail his friends and acquaintances from the bars, brothels and gangs of Paris.

== Style ==
Le Breton's works are known for their directness of style and story. His other strength was his mastery of language, especially of French slang. This gave his works, most of which were about criminals, an authenticity and accuracy.

== Film adaptations ==
Le Breton wrote 77 novels, many of which were adapted into films. His books were mostly about low life. Although his tales lack plot expertise, his characters and unique language made them hugely popular. They were made into successful films like Du rififi chez les hommes (Rififi means 'fisticuffs' or 'fight'). The film was directed by Jules Dassin and starred Jean Servais as Tony, the mastermind of a daring jewel heist.

== Filmography ==
- Razzia sur la chnouf (1955, directed by Henri Decoin)
- Rififi (1955, directed by Jules Dassin)
- Law of the Streets (1956, directed by Ralph Habib)
- Speaking of Murder (1957, directed by Gilles Grangier)
- Rafles sur la ville (1958, directed by Pierre Chenal)
- Du rififi chez les femmes (1959, directed by Alex Joffé)
- Rififi à Tokyo (1963, directed by Jacques Deray)
- The Upper Hand (1966, directed by Denys de La Patellière)
- Brigade antigangs (1966, directed by Bernard Borderie)
- Le clan des siciliens (1969, directed by Henri Verneuil)
- Behind the Walls (2008, directed by Christian Faure)

=== Screenwriter ===
- Bob le flambeur (1956, directed by Jean-Pierre Melville)
- The Good Thief (2002, remake of Bob le flambeur, directed by Neil Jordan)
