= Up from the Beach =

1965 film by Robert Parrish

Up From the Beach
- film poster by Frank McCarthy
- Directed by: Robert Parrish
- Written by: Claude Brulé; Stanley Mann; Howard Clewes
- Based on: Epitaph for an Enemy; 1959 novel by George Barr
- Produced by: Christian Ferry
- Starring: Cliff Robertson; Irina Demick; Red Buttons; Marius Goring; Slim Pickens; James Robertson Justice; Broderick Crawford
- Cinematography: Walter Wottitz
- Music by: Edgar Cosma
- Production company: Panoramic Productions
- Distributed by: 20th Century Fox
- Release date: June 9, 1965
- Running time: 99 minutes
- Countries: United States; France
- Language: English

Up from the Beach is a 1965 French-American international co-production war film directed by Robert Parrish and starring Cliff Robertson, Red Buttons and James Robertson Justice. It was based on a 1958 novel by George Barr called Epitaph for an Enemy.

== Plot ==
Following the Normandy landings at Omaha Beach, an American squad frees a group of French hostages but takes several casualties in an assault in Vierville-sur-Mer.

They capture a German officer who has treated the French in his jurisdiction with kindness, but the American sergeant discovers that no one on the busy beachhead wishes to be bothered with prisoners.

== Cast ==
- Cliff Robertson as Sgt. Edward Baxter
- Red Buttons as Pfc. Harry Devine
- Irina Demick as Lili Rolland
- Marius Goring as German Commandant
- Françoise Rosay as Lili's Grandmother
- Georges Chamarat as Mayor
- Fernand Ledoux as Barrelmaker
- Brian Davies as Pfc. Dinbo
- Paul Maxwell as Cpl. Evans
- Ken Wayne as Pfc. Solly
- Broderick Crawford as MP Major
- James Robertson Justice as British beachmaster
- Slim Pickens as Artillery Colonel
- Raymond Bussières as Dupre

== Production ==
The film was filmed in Cherbourg with a French cast and was set in the aftermath of the Normandy Landings where a group of Allied soldiers attempt to shelter Frenchmen who faced execution by the Nazis. As the US Department of Defense did not cooperate with the film, the American soldiers were played by French soldiers.

Robert Parrish recalled that Darryl F. Zanuck made the film to use unused footage from The Longest Day with the film then marketed as a sequel. Cliff Robertson said he was given the Messerschmitt Bf 108 used in the film. Robertson claimed Zanuck wanted to make the film to showcase his girlfriend Irina Demick who had appeared in The Longest Day. Robertson called the film "Up From the Bitch" Irina Demick, Red Buttons and Fernand Ledoux appeared in the original "The Longest Day".

Oskar Werner was the first choice for the German officer eventually played by Marius Goring. Werner, a World War II Wehrmacht veteran refused on the ground that in his opinion no German officer of the time would have held such humane feelings as the officer portrayed in the film.

== Reception ==
=== Release ===
According to Fox records, the film needed to earn $4,200,000 in rentals to break even and made $2,645,000, meaning it made a loss.

=== Critical response ===
Bosley Crowther of The New York Times wrote: "THE people to watch with pity in 20th Century-Fox's Up From the Beach are the handful of veteran French actors who are helplessly trapped in it. Not only are they representing a group of villagers in Normandy who are marched all over the country by the confused American invaders on D-Day-plus-one, but they are also obviously at the mercy of the confused Americans who made the film."
