= The Sicilian Clan =

- French theatrical release poster
- Directed by: Henri Verneuil
- Screenplay by: Henri Verneuil; José Giovanni; Pierre Pélégri
- Based on: Le clan des Siciliens by Auguste Le Breton
- Produced by: Jacques-Eric Strauss
- Starring: Jean Gabin; Alain Delon; Lino Ventura; Irina Demick; Amedeo Nazzari; Sydney Chaplin
- Cinematography: Henri Decaë
- Edited by: Pierre Gillette (French version); Jean-Michel Gautier (English version); Albert Jurgenson
- Music by: Ennio Morricone
- Production companies: Fox Europa; Paris Films du Siècle
- Distributed by: 20th Century Fox
- Release date: 1 December 1969 (France)
- Running time: 121 minutes
- Countries: France; Italy
- Languages: French; Italian; English
- Budget: $4 million
- Box office: $9 million (rentals)

The Sicilian Clan (French: Le clan des Siciliens) is a 1969 French-Italian gangster film based on the novel by Auguste Le Breton. It was directed by Henri Verneuil and stars Jean Gabin, Lino Ventura and Alain Delon, whose casting has been credited with the film's box office success in France. Ennio Morricone composed the score for the film.

== Plot ==
In Paris, robber and murderer Roger Sartet escapes from custody with the help of the Manalese, a small, well-organized Sicilian Mafia clan consisting of patriarch Vittorio, his two sons, and his son-in-law. Sartet pays them with some valuable stamps he had stowed away, and the Manalese hide him in an apartment above the arcade game manufacturing company they own as a front. Jeanne, the French wife of Vittorio's elder son, looks after Sartet, but he sneaks out to see a prostitute at a hotel and narrowly avoids getting captured by Commissaire Le Goff.

While in prison, Sartet got to know an engineer who worked on the security for a jewelry exhibition in Rome before becoming incarcerated, and he learns the details of the system. He proposes that the Manalese help him rob the show, but they are dubious of the hot-headed outsider, so Vittorio and his old friend Tony Nicosia, who has lived in New York City for decades, go to the exhibition to check it out. They notice additional security measures negate Sartet's plan, but, after learning the show will soon be moved to New York, Nicosia comes up with a plan to steal the jewels in transit. He sends Jack, an alcoholic ex-pilot, to Paris to help the Manalese with the heist.

Figuring Sartet will need fake papers to leave the country, Le Goff tracks down the forger who made his previous fake passport. By coincidence, Vittorio was having the same man make several fake passports as part of the heist, and Le Goff finds the phone number of one of Vittorio's employees at the forger's studio. Le Goff questions Vittorio, but he says the employee no longer works for him.

The Manalese clan retreat to a hideout near the Italian border. Jeanne sunbathes nude in front of Sartet and they start to have sex, but are interrupted by Roberto, her six-year-old nephew. She entreats him not to tell anyone.

Sartet goes to Rome, where he discreetly kidnaps Edward Evans, an English insurance man, and takes Evans' place among the small group of officials sent to guard the jewels during their trip on a passenger flight. As Jack, Jeanne, Vittorio, and his sons wait to catch the plane when it stops in Paris, they are surprised to see Evans' wife arrive and, intending to accompany her husband to New York, board the plane early. Thinking fast when Mrs. Evans returns from the plane, Vittorio leads her to believe that Evans will be on the same flight the next day, as that is when the jewels are really being transported. While the plane loads and takes off, Mrs. Evans puts through a call to her husband's hotel in Rome. When she learns he never arrived there, she contacts the police and identifies Sartet as one of the men she saw on the plane.

During the plane's descent towards New York, the Manalese clan hijack the aircraft. Warned of Sartet's imminent arrival in the United States, the local police race to the airport, but Jack lands the plane on a new stretch of highway that is not yet open. Nicosia's men are waiting to unload the jewels, and the gangsters split up. Sartet hides out in New York while he waits for his share of the proceeds and a ticket to Veracruz.

Back home in Paris, the Manalese family watch a film in which a couple start to have sex, and Roberto exclaims that it looks just like what Sartet was doing with Jeanne. Though Jeanne denies everything, Vittorio lures Sartet back to Paris by withholding his share of the loot. Jeanne calls Sartet's sister, Monique, and asks her to warn him of the trap. Monique goes to the airport, where she finds Vittorio's sons and son-in-law waiting for Sartet, and they are all arrested by Le Goff, who was monitoring Monique's telephone.

Sartet, who had arrived in Paris by an earlier flight than expected, calls Vittorio to arrange a meeting at an isolated spot. Vittorio brings Jeanne with him, and, while Sartet examines the money, Vittorio shoots Sartet and Jeanne dead, leaving the cash by the corpses. When Vittorio returns home, Le Goff is waiting to arrest him.

== Cast ==
- Jean Gabin as Vittorio Manalese, the head of a Sicilian crime family, whose arcade game manufacturing company is a front for his criminal activities
- Alain Delon as Roger Sartet, an escaped robber and murderer
- Lino Ventura as Commissaire Le Goff, who is trying to recapture Sartet
- Irina Demick as Jeanne Manalese, Aldo's wife
- Amedeo Nazzari as Tony Nicosia, an old friend of Vittorio
- Sydney Chaplin as Jack, an American ex-pilot who Nicosia sends to help with the heist
- Philippe Baronnet as Luigi, Theresa's husband
- Karen Blanguernon as Theresa, Vittorio and Maria's daughter
- Yves Brainville as Sartet's examining magistrate
- Gérard Buhr as a police inspector who works with Le Goff
- Elisa Cegani as Maria Manalese, Vittorio's wife
- Raoul Delfosse as Léoni, one of Vittorio's employees
- Jacques Duby as Raymond Robel, a police informant
- Yves Lefebvre as Aldo Manalese, Vittorio and Maria's elder son
- Edward Meeks as the airline captain
- Sally Nesbitt as Mrs. Evans, the wife of the insurance man
- Marc Porel as Sergio Manalese, Vittorio and Maria's younger son
- André Pousse as Malik, a photographer and forger
- André Thorent as Inspector Bordier, who helps guard the jewels while they are at Orly Airport
- Leopoldo Trieste as Turi Lo Cascio, a stamp expert
- Danielle Volle as Monique Sartet, Roger's sister
- Steve Eckardt as Inspector Wilson of the New York police
- Roger Lumont as Albert, a hotel manager
- Sabine Sun as Simone, a prostitute
- Christian de Tillière as Jean-Marie Ballard, an alarm system engineer who shared a cell with Sartet

Uncredited

- Bernard Musson as the gendarme in the back of the van during Sartet's transfer
- Rudy Lenoir as the gendarme who guards Sartet at the courthouse
- Philippe Vallauris as a police inspector who works with Le Goff
- César Chauveau as Roberto, Theresa and Luigi's young son
- Catherine Watteau as a customer service representative at Orly

== Production ==
=== Development ===
The Sicilian Clan was based on the second novel in a series by Auguste Le Breton. The first, which also featured the characters of Sartet and Le Goff, had been filmed by Bernard Borderie as Brigade antigangs in 1966.

The film rights to The Sicilian Clan were bought by Henri Verneuil, who teamed with Jacques-Eric Strauss and signed a deal with 20th Century Fox. Verneuil wrote a screenplay with Pierre Pelegri and then José Giovanni. The two lead roles were written with Jean Gabin and Alain Delon in mind, as Verneuil had worked with both men before. As the writing progressed, Verneuil began to feel that the police officer was another strong role, and he decided to cast Lino Ventura, who had made his film debut 15 years earlier in Touchez pas au grisbi, which also starred Gabin.

Irina Demick was unhappy with her character in the film compared to the novel, in which she was more active, and wanted her to take part in the hijacking. Verneuil felt this would not be believable, but Demick had considerable influence, as she was the mistress of the head of Fox, Darryl F. Zanuck, so Verneuil rewrote the sequence.

=== Filming ===
Second unit filming started in New York in March 1969. The main unit went into production on March 24 at Franstudio's Saint-Maurice Studios. The film was shot in two versions--one with the actors speaking French, and another with the actors speaking English.

Actor Roger Lumont, who played the hotel manager Albert and was bilingual, later stated in a filmed interview that his scene with Lino Ventura was shot in English. Lumont recalled being surprised by Ventura's ability to handle the scene in English, although Ventura was not generally regarded as fluent in the language.

During production, Delon was involved in a real-life scandal, the Marković affair, which surrounded the still-unsolved murder of his former bodyguard Stevan Marković several months earlier.

== Release ==
The film had its premiere in Paris on 8 December 1969.

== Reception ==
=== Box office ===
In France, The Sicilian Clan drew 4,821,585 admissions, making it the third-most-popular movie of 1969 in France, behind Once Upon a Time in the West and The Brain. It was the second-highest-grossing film of all time in France, behind La Grande Vadrouille (1966), when only considering films not shown on a roadshow release basis. In the United States and Canada, the film earned $1 million in theatrical rentals during 1970.

According to Fox records, the film required $7,925,000 in rentals to break even, and it had earned worldwide rentals of $9,250,000 by 11 December 1970. By September 1970, it had made Fox a profit of $533,000.

=== Critical reception ===
Vincent Canby of The New York Times wrote that the film "has its occasional moments... but mostly it's a tired example of a tired genre." Kevin Thomas of The Los Angeles Times said it "winds up seeming more corny and contrived than witty and ironic."

Retrospectively, and more positively, in the book French Cinema: From Its Beginnings to the Present, author Rémi Fournier Lanzoni wrote: "This gangster film reinvented the classic gangster genre, elevating it to a higher level with its hard-boiled acting, deep character studies, and attractive photography."
