= Speaking of Murder =

1957 French crime film directed by Gilles Grangier

- French theatrical release poster
- Directed by: Gilles Grangier
- Written by: Michel Audiard (adaptation); Gilles Grangier (adaptation); Auguste Le Breton (adaptation); Auguste Le Breton (dialogue)
- Based on: a novel by Auguste Le Breton
- Produced by: Jacques Bar; Alain Poiré
- Starring: Jean Gabin
- Cinematography: Louis Page
- Edited by: Christian Gaudin; Jacqueline Sadoul
- Music by: Denis Kieffer
- Color process: Black and white
- Production companies: Cité Films; Société Nouvelle des Établissements Gaumont
- Distributed by: Gaumont Distribution
- Release date: 12 April 1957
- Running time: 85 minutes
- Country: France
- Language: French

Speaking of Murder is a 1957 French crime film directed by Gilles Grangier and starring Jean Gabin. The original French title is Le rouge est mis, which means "the red light is on". The screenplay is based on a novel by Auguste Le Breton.

== Plot ==
Louis Bertain (Gabin) is the owner of a Paris garage which is the front for a robbery gang. He and his accomplices are careful to keep up a civic veneer by day, indulging in criminal activities only when "the red light is on" at night. This status quo is upset when one of the gang members becomes convinced that Louis' younger brother is a police informer.

== Cast ==
- Jean Gabin as Louis Bertain / Louis le Blond
- Paul Frankeur as Frédo
- Marcel Bozzuffi as Pierre (as Marcel Bozzufi)
- Albert Dinan as L'inspecteur Pluvier (as Dinan)
- Antonin Berval as Zé (as Berval)
- Thomy Bourdelle as Le catcheur
- Serge Lecointe as Bébert
- Jean-Pierre Mocky as Pierre
- Jo Peignot as Mimile (as Georges Peignot)
- Lucien Raimbourg as Jo
- Gabriel Gobin as L'inspecteur Bouvard
- Jean Bérard as Raymond, le matelot
- Gaby Basset as Hortense
- Gina Nicloz as Mme Bertain (as Gina Niclos)
- Lucienne Legrand as La dame du garage
- Josselin as Antoine
- Claude Nicot as L'effeminé
- Lino Ventura as Pepito
- Annie Girardot as Hélène (as Annie Girardot de la Comédie Française)

== See also ==
- List of French films of 1957
