= Magali Noël =

French actress and singer (1931–2015)

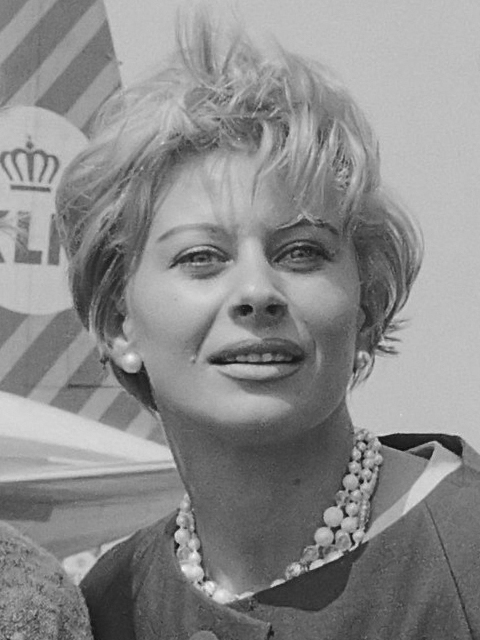
- Noël in 1960
- Born: 27 June 1931; İzmir, Turkey
- Died: 23 June 2015 (aged 83); Châteauneuf-Grasse, France
- Occupations: Actress, singer
- Years active: 1951–2002

Magali Noëlle Guiffray (27 June 1931 – 23 June 2015), better known as Magali Noël (French pronunciation: [maɡali nɔɛl]), was a French actress and singer.

== Biography ==
=== Actress career ===
Born in İzmir to French parents in the diplomatic service, she left Turkey for France in 1951, and her acting career began soon thereafter.

She acted in multilingual cinema chiefly from 1951 to 1980, appearing in three Italian films directed by Federico Fellini, for whom she was a favorite performer and known as his muse. She took on a new dimension by embodying one of the symbols of Federico Fellini's sexual fantasies in La dolce vita (1960), Satyricon (1969), and Amarcord (1973), where she played Gradisca, provincial pin-up.

She acted in films directed by Costa Gavras, Jean Renoir and Jules Dassin. Despite a notable role in Z by Costa-Gavras, Palme d'Or at Cannes in 1969, and great successes at the theater, she subsequently received less attention from producers. She then returned successfully to the music hall.

A new generation of directors then gave her roles: Chantal Akerman (Les Rendez-vous d'Anna, 1978), Claude Goretta (La Mort de Mario Ricci, 1983), Tonie Marshall (Pentimento, 1989), Andrzej Żuławski (La Fidélité, 2000), Jonathan Demme (The Truth About Charlie, 2002).

Her career extended to television movies from roughly 1980 to 2002.

=== Singer career ===
Her recording career began in France in 1956, and her most famous song was "Fais-moi mal, Johnny" ("Hurt me Johnny"), written by Boris Vian. This song was one of the first rock 'n' roll songs with French lyrics. It was censored from the radio due to its risqué lyrics.

She died on 23 June 2015, four days before her 84th birthday.

== Filmography ==
- 1951: Tomorrow We Get Divorced – Jeanne Tourelle
- 1951: Alone in Paris – Jeanette Milliard
- 1953: Deux de l'escadrille
- 1954: Mourez nous ferons le reste – Françoise
- 1955: Caroline and the Rebels – Térésa
- 1955: Razzia sur la chnouf – Lisette
- 1955: Rififi – Viviane
- 1955: The Lowest Crime – Denise
- 1955: Les Grandes Manœuvres – Thérèse
- 1956: Les Possédées – Pia Manosque
- 1956: Eléna et les hommes – Lolotte, Elena's maid
- 1957: Assassins et voleurs – Madeleine Ferrand
- 1957: OSS 117 Is Not Dead – Muriel Rousset
- 1958: Le désir mène les hommes – Nathalie
- 1958: Si le roi savait ça – Arnaude
- 1958: Le Piège – Cora Caillé
- 1958: La Loi de l'homme (È arrivata la parigina) – Yvette
- 1959: It Only Happens to the Living – Gloria Selby
- 1959: Temptation – Jane
- 1959: The Road to Shame – Coraline Merlin
- 1959: Oh! Qué mambo – Viviane Montero
- 1959: Noi siamo due evasi – Odette
- 1960: Marie of the Isles – Julie
- 1960: Gastone – Sonia
- 1960: La Dolce Vita – Fanny
- 1960: Boulevard – Jenny Dorr
- 1960: A Qualcuna Piace Calvo – Marcella Salustri
- 1961: The Sahara Is Burning – Lénq
- 1961: Girl in the Window – Chanel
- 1961: Legge di guerra – Olga
- 1961: Jeunesse de nuit (Gioventù di notte) – Elvi
- 1961: Dans la gueule du loup – Barbara Yabakos
- 1961: Destination Fury
- 1961: Murder Party – Eva Troger
- 1962: The Secret Mark of D'Artagnan – Carlotta
- 1963: Storm Over Ceylon – Gaby
- 1963: The Accident – Andréa
- 1963: Toto and Cleopatra – Cleopatra
- 1964: Queste pazze pazze donne – Giulia - Martini's wife ('La garçonnière')
- 1964: I marziani hanno 12 mani – Matilde Bernabei
- 1964: Requiem pour un caïd – Éva
- 1964: Oltraggio al pudore – Giovenella's sister
- 1964: Le Dernier Tiercé – Lydia
- 1965: Hot Frustrations – Louisa
- 1965: La Corde au cou
- 1965: Aventure à Beyrouth (La Dama de Beirut) – Gloria Lefevre
- 1966: Comment ne pas épouser un milliardaire (TV Series) – Delia Delamarre
- 1967: Le Golem (TV Movie) – Angelina
- 1968: The Most Beautiful Month – Claudia
- 1968: L'Astragale – Annie
- 1969: Z – Nick's sister
- 1969: Satyricon – Fortunata
- 1970: Tropic of Cancer – the princess
- 1970: The Lustful Vicar (Kyrkoherden) – the countess
- 1970: The Man Who Had Power Over Women – Mme Franchetti
- 1970: The Swinging Confessors – Signora Bellini
- 1970: Edipeon
- 1971: * The Beasts (1971) – Lisa (segment "Il cincillà")
- 1972: Comme avant mieux qu'avant (TV Movie) – Fulvia Gelli
- 1972: Le p'tit vient vite – La garde-malade
- 1972: Master of Love – Prudenzia
- 1973: Amarcord – Ninola / "Gradisca", the hairdresser
- 1975: Paolo Barca, Schoolteacher and Weekend Nudist – Signora cacchiò
- 1975: Il tempo degli assassini – Rossana
- 1975: La Banca di Monate – Melissa, Adelmo's wife
- 1977: Stato interessante – Tilde La Monica (second story)
- 1978: Jean-Christophe (TV Series)
- 1979: Les Rendez-vous d'Anna – Ida
- 1980: Le Chemin perdu – Maria
- 1980: Le président est gravement malade (TV Movie) – Edith Wilson
- 1982: The Confessions of Felix Krull (TV Mini-Series) – Mme Houpflé
- 1982: Qu'est-ce qui fait courir David ? – Sarah, David's mother
- 1982: L'Enfant et les magiciens (TV Series) – Aunt Marguerite
- 1983: Les Années 80
- 1983: The Death of Mario Ricci – Solange
- 1984: Sortie interdite (TV Series) – Mado
- 1985: Diesel – Mickey
- 1985: Vertiges – Constance
- 1986: Exit-exil – Solange
- 1986: L'Amour tango (TV Series) – Angèle
- 1988: On the Orient, North (The Ray Bradbury Theater, ep.#2.8) – Minerva Halliday
- 1989: Pentimento – Maddeleine
- 1989: La Nuit de l'éclusier – Hélène Belloz
- 1991: Crimes et jardins (TV Movie) – Suzanne
- 1992: Les Coeurs brûlés (miniseries) – Julia
- 1997: Les Héritiers (TV Movie) – Zizi
- 1998: Le Dernier Fils (TV Movie) – Elisabeth Haas
- 1999: La Nuit des hulottes (TV Series) – Rainette Leblanc
- 2000: Fidelity – Clélia's mother
- 2001: Regina Coeli – Regina
- 2002: La Source des Sarrazins (TV Movie) – Rose
- 2002: The Truth About Charlie – mysterious woman in black (final film role)

== Discography ==
- 1956 : Fais-moi mal Johnny de Boris Vian
- 1964 : Magali Noël chante Boris Vian
- 1988 : Magali Noël chante Boris Vian (CD Jacques Canetti/Musidisc)
- 1989 : Regard sur Vian, with Stéphanie Noël, live in Beausobre
- 2002 : Magali Noël (CD Story Mercury)
