= The Upper Hand (film) =

- Film poster
- Directed by: Denys de La Patellière
- Written by: Denys de La Patellière dialogue Alphonse Boudard
- Based on: novel by Auguste Le Breton
- Produced by: Raymond Danon
- Starring: Jean Gabin; George Raft; Gert Fröbe; Nadja Tiller; Mireille Darc
- Cinematography: Walter Wottitz
- Edited by: Claude Durand
- Music by: Georges Garvarentz
- Distributed by: Comacico
- Release date: 1966
- Running time: 100 minutes
- Country: France
- Language: French
- Box office: 1,983,477 admissions (France)

The Upper Hand (Du rififi à Paname) is a 1966 French thriller film about gold smuggling based on the novel by Auguste Le Breton and starring Jean Gabin, George Raft and Gert Fröbe.

== Plot ==
Paul Berger, known as Paulo les diams, is a smuggler who works with his old friend Walter, an antique dealer married to Irene. Paulo recruits his smugglers from a nightclub with the help of his employees Rene and Lili.

They recruit a man called Mike Coppolano to smuggle, not knowing he is an American secret agent who has gone undercover. Mike is hired as Paulo's bodyguard after saving Paulo's life in a shoot out.

Gangster Giulio kidnaps Irene, and Mike shoots Giulio. Walter is killed and Paulo swears to avenge him.

Mafia gangster Binnagio insists Paulo and Mario get along. Mike steals a notebook in which Walter wrote down the flow chart of the arms trade. Paulo sets off a bomb in the middle of a meeting with the mafia.

Paulo and the survivors of the bomb are arrested.

== Cast ==
- Jean Gabin ... Paul Berger
- Gert Fröbe ... Walter
- George Raft ... Charles Binnaggio
- Nadja Tiller ... Irène
- Claudio Brook ... Mike Coppolano
- Mireille Darc ... Lili Princesse
- Marcel Bozzuffi ... Marque Mal
- Claude Brasseur ... Giulio
- Daniel Ceccaldi ... Commissaire Noël

== Production ==
Producer Maurice Jaquin made the film following the success of Tonnerre de Dieu. It as heavily influenced by the current popularity of James Bond and oSS 117 films. The actual star of the movie was Claudio Brook, a Mexican actor who had worked with Luis Buñuel. The filmmakers hoped for an international audience and cast several non French actors including Gert Froebe and George Raft.

== Reception ==
The New York Times called it "meandering, stilted and extremely flat melodrama" which "spurts to life towards the end" when Gabin meets George Raft and "the two men lock eyeballs like two king cobras" with "a chilling authenticity".

The film was a moderate success at the French box office.

== The Belgrade terrorist attack ==
On July 13, 1968, during the projection of The Upper Hand in the "20. oktobar" cinema in Belgrade, Yugoslavia, a bomb was detonated, killing one person and injuring 89. Croatian Miljenko Hrkać has been convicted of the attack and sentenced to death.
