= Razzia sur la chnouf =

- Directed by: Henri Decoin
- Written by: Auguste Le Breton; Henri Decoin; Maurice Griffe
- Produced by: Paul Wagner
- Starring: Jean Gabin; Marcel Dalio; Lino Ventura
- Cinematography: Pierre Montazel
- Edited by: Denise Reiss
- Music by: Marc Lanjean
- Production company: Société Nouvelle des Établissements Gaumont
- Distributed by: Gaumont Distribution
- Release date: 7 April 1955
- Running time: 105 minutes
- Country: France
- Language: French
- Box office: 2,906,148 admissions (France)

Razzia sur la chnouf (French for "Raid on the Dope") is a 1955 French gangster film directed by Henri Decoin that stars Jean Gabin, Lino Ventura, Lila Kedrova and Magali Noël. The screenplay, based on a novel by Auguste Le Breton, explores the contemporary drug scene in Paris and the efforts of the police to limit it. The film was released as Razzia in the United States, distributed by Kassler Films Inc. with English subtitles by Herman G. Weinberg.

== Plot ==
After a spell in the US, master criminal Henri "le Nantais" returns to Paris and is recruited by Paul Liski, head of a major narcotics ring, to improve efficiency of distribution. Merchandise has been disappearing and unreliable dealers must be eliminated. For the latter purpose he is assigned two hit men, Catalan and Bibi. As his cover, he is made manager of a restaurant, Le Troquet, much favoured by the underworld. As soon as he walks in, he catches the eye of the cashier, Lisette, whom he easily seduces. The first task he is given is Émile Lourmel, a courier who wants out, not understanding that there is only one way to leave the organization: Catalan and Bibi kill him. Then he visits a laboratory and takes most of its stock to the port of Le Havre, to be shipped overseas. The chemist at the laboratory is found to have given more drugs to the courier than instructed, so he's roughed up by Catalan and Bibi while the courier, who was selling the drugs on the side, is killed by them after being found by Henri. Soon, the organization learns that the police has found the consignment sent via Le Havre.

Police pressure intensifies, with a raid on Le Troquet in which all of the staff and customers are taken in for questioning. They exempt Lisette, who has moved into Henri's apartment upstairs. After being released, Henri gives her a phone number to call if she feels that his life is in danger. Henri continues his investigations into weak distribution links, visiting among other sordid spots an opium den and a club for black smokers of marijuana. When Catalan and Bibi are sent to eliminate an unreliable dealer, they walk into a police ambush and escape albeit wounded, after killing two. They immediately go to Le Troquet and demand that Henri take them to Liski, whom they want to provide them with a place to lay low. Lisette overhears and makes the phone call. When the three men go to Liski's house, he gives them money, a map and keys to his country hideaway. Shortly after they arrive, police raid the house. Henri reveals that he is an undercover detective and demands Catalan and Bibi surrender; they shoot back, killing a policeman and wounding Henri in the arm, and are killed. The police, who had been alerted by Lisette, take Henri to headquarters, where the whole drug ring from Liski downwards are, after being arrested.

== Cast ==
- Jean Gabin: Henri "le Nantais" Ferré
- Magali Noël: Lisette, the cashier
- Lino Ventura: Roger "le Catalan", hitman
- Albert Rémy: Bibi, hitman
- Paul Frankeur: Police Commissioner Fernand
- Pierre-Louis: Inspector LeRoux
- Marcel Dalio: Paul Liski, boss of the drug ring
- Roland Armontel: Louis Birot, drug processor
- Jacqueline Porel: Solange Birot, his wife
- Michel Jourdan: Marcel, a pusher
- Jo Peignot: Manager of the Pushers
- André Weber: Li Chiang, a pusher
- Lila Kedrova: Léa, an addict
- Jacques Josselin: Fredo, a pusher
- Jean Sylvère: Émile Lourmel, a railroad employee and drug courier
- Léopoldo Francès: Assumpcion, speakeasy operator-pusher
- Auguste Le Breton: Auguste "Le Breton", a gangster
- François Patrice: Jo, a dealer
- Marcel Bozzuffi : restaurant customer with revolver
- Simone Sylvestre : girl of the customer with revolver
- Paul Azaïs : bar tenant
- Laurence Badie : florist and dealer
- Gabriel Gobin : restaurant customer
- René Berthier : doctor
- Roger Carel : policeman on the car phone
- Hélène Roussel : Liski's maid
- Jean-Claude Michel : train cleaner (uncredited)
- Gisèle Grandpré
