= Ward of the Nation =

French special civil status

Ward of the Nation (Pupille de la Nation) is a French civil status allocated by the State to those who have a parent who was injured or killed in war, or (since the November 2015 Paris attacks) during a terrorist incident, or while carrying out certain public services.

Partly symbolic as "adoptees of the Nation" and partly remunerative, it goes beyond a Ward of the State, which in France is a minor person, such as an orphan, under the care and responsibility of the French state.

It is administered by the National Office of Wards of the Nation, created by the Law of 27 July 1917 and is part of the French Ministry of National Education.
