= Lando Buzzanca =

Italian actor (1935–2022)

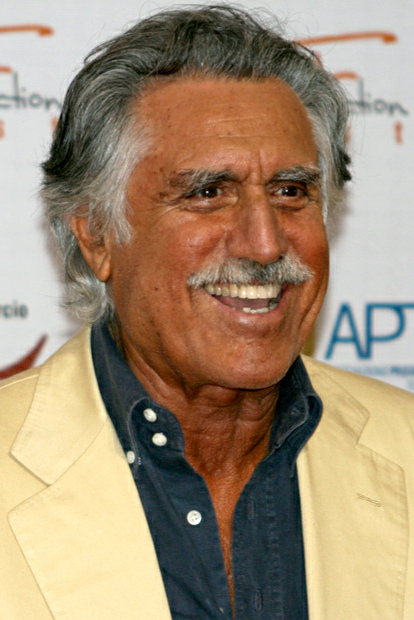
- Buzzanca in 2009
- Born: Gerlando Buzzanca; 24 August 1935; Palermo, Italy
- Died: 18 December 2022 (aged 87); Rome, Italy
- Education: Accademia d'arte drammatica Pietro Scharoff
- Occupations: Actor, theatre director
- Years active: 1959–2021
- Spouse: Lucia Peralta (m. 1956; died 2010)
- Children: 2

Gerlando "Lando" Buzzanca (24 August 1935 – 18 December 2022) was an Italian stage, film, and television actor whose career spanned 65 years.

== Life and career ==
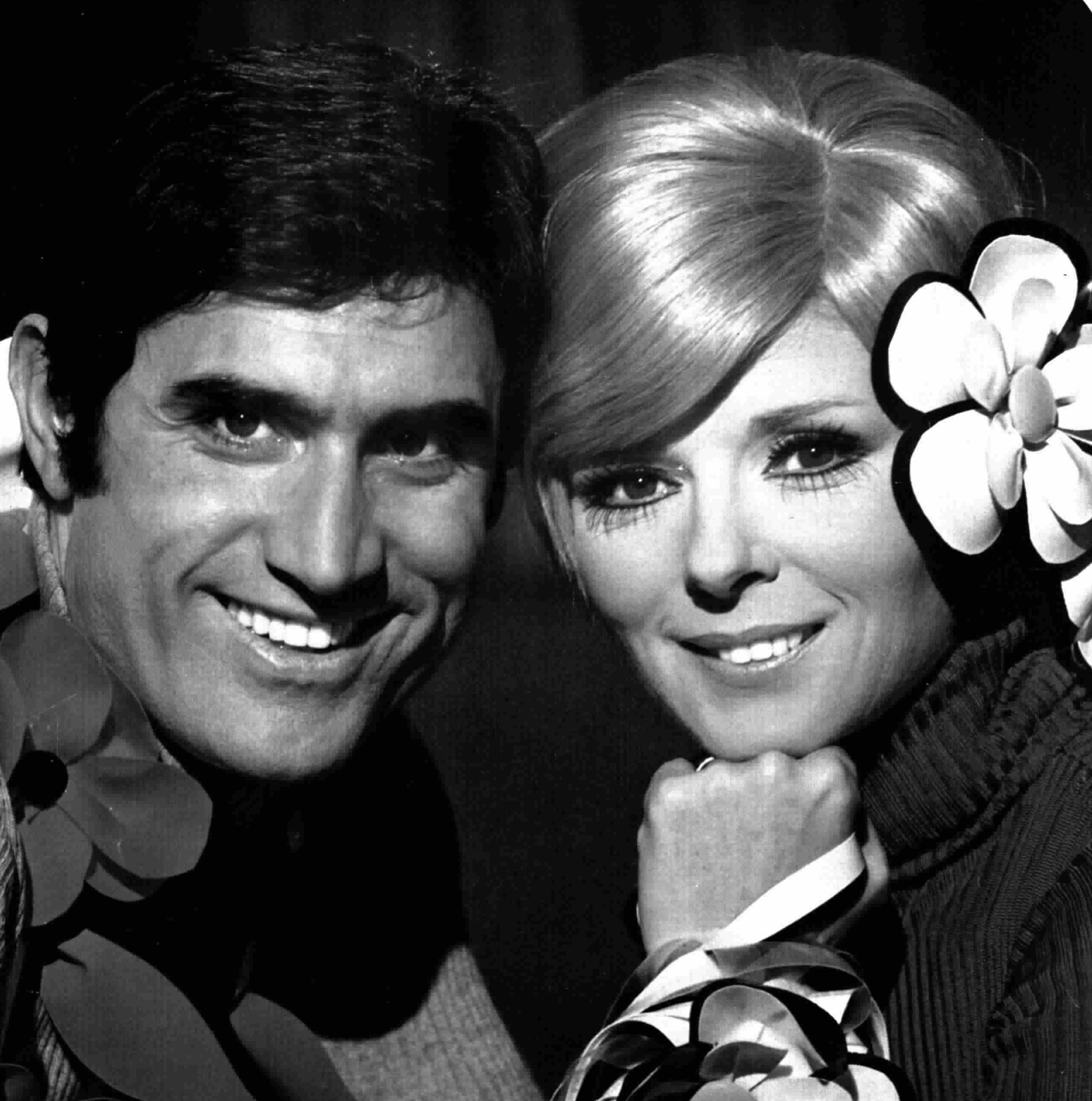
Lando Buzzanca and Delia Scala in the television show Signore e signora (1970)

=== Early years ===
Born in Palermo the son of a cinema projectionist, at 16 years old Buzzanca left the high school and moved to Rome to pursue his dream of becoming an actor. In order to survive, he took many jobs including waiter, furniture mover, and a brief appearance as a slave in the film Ben-Hur. He made his official debut in Pietro Germi's Divorce Italian Style, and soon specialized in the role of the average immigrant from southern Italy.

=== 1970s–1980s: Huge success in the commedia sexy all'italiana ===
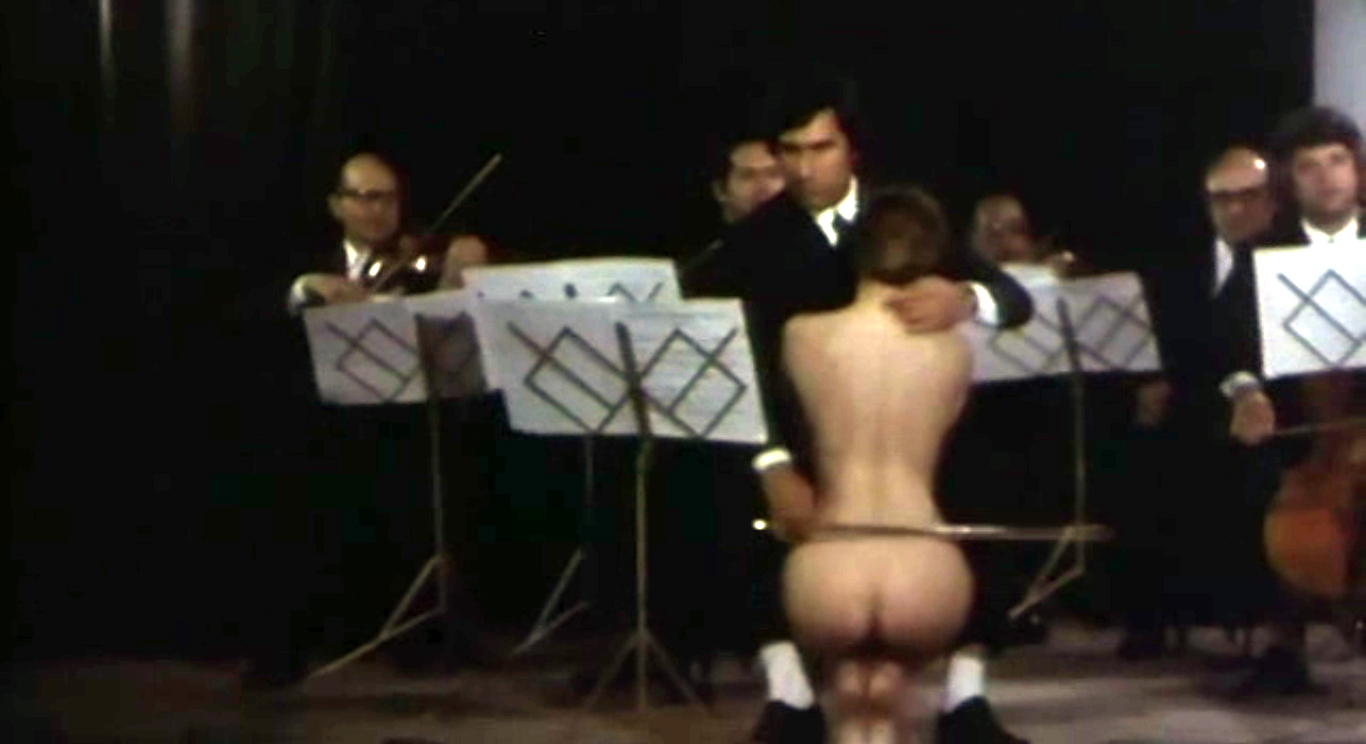
Lando Buzzanca with Laura Antonelli in Secret Fantasy (1971), directed by Pasquale Festa Campanile

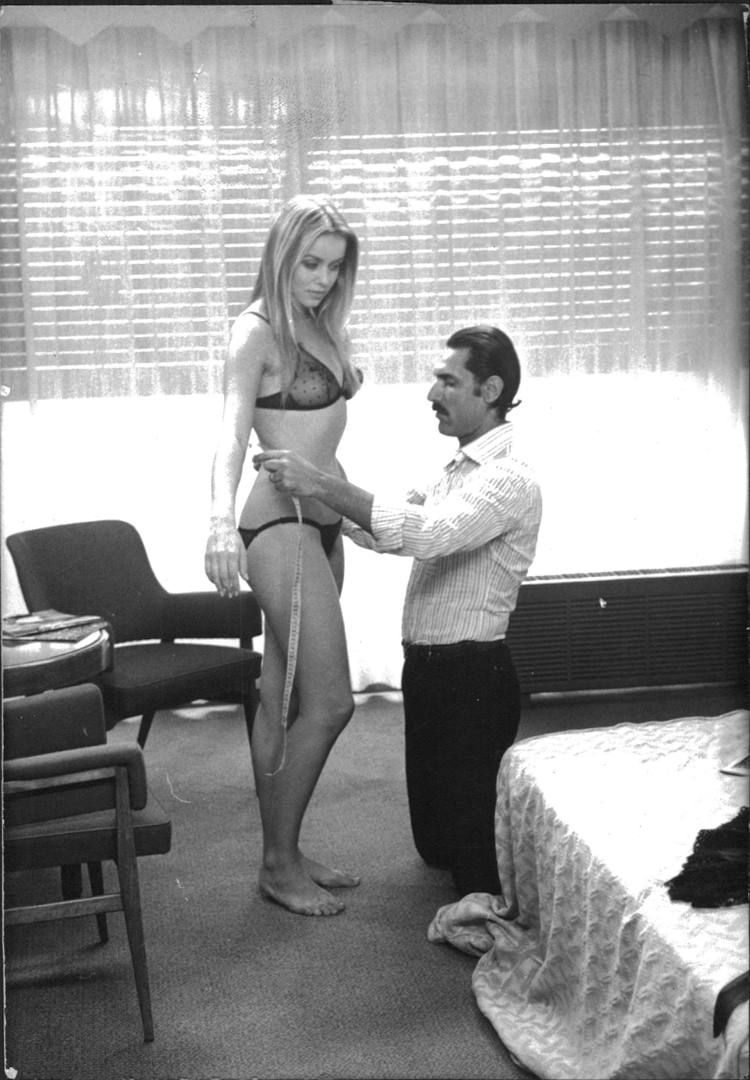
Il gatto mammone (1975), with Gloria Guida and Lando Buzzanca

After two successful "James Tont" films in which he played a parody of James Bond in the 1960s, and having starred in 33 films already, he was "discovered" in 1970 in The Swinging Confessors (also known as The Married Priest). Buzzanca then had a large success in a series of satirical commedia sexy all'italiana films which satirized major institutions such as politics, religion, trade unions and financial world. Lando Buzzanca with Laura Antonelli in Il merlo maschio (1971) directed by Pasquale Festa Campanile, which was a huge success and made him a major star in the genre of commedia sexy all'italiana. In the following years he acted alongside famous actresses of the moment, such as Claudia Cardinale, Catherine Spaak, Barbara Bouchet, Gloria Guida, Senta Berger and Joan Collins. His 17 films since The Swinging Confessors grossed 20 billion lire ($32 million).

=== 1990s–2000s: The theater, the last great film and the well received TV series. ===
With the decline of the genre, he slowed his film activities, focusing into theatre and television, in which he enjoyed a resurgence of popularity in the 2000s thanks to a series of well-received TV-series.

In 2007 he starred in the feature film I Viceré by Roberto Faenza, for which he was nominated for the David di Donatello for best leading actor and won the Globo d'oro for best actor.

=== 2010s: Success of the TV series ===
From 2012 to 2014 Buzzanca played the lead actor in the successful TV series il restauratore, in 28 episodes. Buzzanca concluded the series despite the depression caused by the death of his wife, the suicide attempt and the onset of a mild cerebral ischemia.

=== Later years ===
In 2013, following the death of his wife Lucia and a heavy depression, Buzzanca attempted suicide by cutting his veins.
In 2014 he suffered from a mild cerebral ischemia which caused him aphasia, but by the following year he had fully recovered from his depressive period and started a relationship with a younger woman, Antonella.
In 2016 he participated as dancer in the television program Ballando con le Stelle and started a romance with a younger actress and journalist Francesca Della Valle.

=== 2020s: physical decline ===
On 21 April 2021, he fell at home and suffered a head injury; he was rescued by the maid, who found him the day after the accident still unconscious on the ground and called an ambulance. He was admitted to the Santo Spirito hospital in Rome. On 15 August 2021, Buzzanca, after the treatment received at the hospital, seemed to have fully recovered, as confirmed also by his son Massimiliano. On 27 December 2021, Buzzanca was hospitalized at the health facility in Rome, due to the worsening of his health conditions. In his later years Buzzanca suffered from senile dementia.

=== Death ===
On 18 December 2022, Buzzanca died at the Agostino Gemelli University Policlinic in Rome, where he was recovered a few days prior because of a fall, at the age of 87.

On 21 December 2022, the funeral ceremony took place in the Church of the Artists in Rome, in which his partner Francesca Della Valle unexpectedly did not take part.

== Awards ==
David di Donatello

Year	Nominee / work	Award	Result
2008	I Vicerè	Best Actor	Nominated

Globo d'oro, Italy

Year	Nominee / work	Award	Result
2008	I Vicerè	Best Actor	Won

== Filmography ==
=== Film ===
Year	Film	Role	Director
1959	Ben-Hur	Jewish Slave in the Desert (uncredited)	William Wyler
1961	Divorce, Italian Style	Rosario Mulè	Pietro Germi
1962	His Days Are Numbered	Son of Cesare	Elio Petri
1963	The Eye of the Needle	carabiniere Sanfilippo	Marcello Andrei
1963	The Girl from Parma	Michele Pantanò	Antonio Pietrangeli
1963	Le monachine	Amilcare Franzetti	Luciano Salce
1963	I mostri	Luciana's Husband (segment "Come un padre")	Dino Risi
1964	Extraconjugal	Roberto (segment "La doccia")	Massimo Franciosa 1964 Le corniaud the barber
1964	Corpse for the Lady	Enzo	Mario Mattoli
1964	Seduced and Abandoned	Antonio Ascalone	Pietro Germi
1964	Love in Four Dimensions	Sicilian husband	Mino Guerrini (segment "Amore e alfabeto")
1964	I marziani hanno dodici mani	Lo sposo	Castellano & Pipolo
1964	Love and Marriage	(segment "La prima notte")	Mino Guerrini and Gianni Puccini
1964	The Magnificent Cuckold	Guardian	Antonio Pietrangeli
1965	Su e giù	Cuccio (segment "Questione di Principo")	Mino Guerrini
1965	Letti sbagliati	(segment "Il complicato")	Steno
1965	James Tont operazione U.N.O.	James Tont	Bruno Corbucci
1965	James Tont operazione D.U.E.	James Tont	Bruno Corbucci
1965	The Sucker	Lino	Gérard Oury
1965	The Double Bed	Birolli	Jean Delannoy, François Dupont-Midi, Alvaro Mancori and Gianni Puccini
1965	Made in Italy	Giulio (segment "Usi e costumi")	Nanni Loy
1966	For a Few Dollars Less	Bill	Mario Mattoli
1966	Ringo and Gringo Against All	Serg. Gringo	Bruno Corbucci
1966	Our Husbands	Ragionier Manzi (segment "Il Marito di Olga")	Luigi Filippo D'Amico, Dino Risi and Luigi Zampa
1966	After the Fox	Police Chief	Vittorio De Sica
1967	Spia, spione	Carlo Barazzetti	Bruno Corbucci
1967	A Rose for Everyone	Lino	Franco Rossi
1967	Don Juan in Sicily	Giovanni Percolla	Alberto Lattuada
1967	Operation St. Peter's	Napoleone	Lucio Fulci
1967	Anyone Can Play	Blackmailer	Luigi Zampa
1968	Colpo di sole	?	Mino Guerrini
1968	Better a Widow	Massito	Duccio Tessari
1968	Criminal Affair	Esteban de Flori	Rossano Brazzi
1969	Puro siccome un angelo papà mi fece monaco... di Monza	Nunzio di Licordia	Giovanni Grimaldi
1969	La donna a una dimensione	Host on TV (uncredited)	Bruno Baratti
1969	House of Pleasure	Count Lombardini	Franz Antel
1969	Monte Carlo or Bust!	Marcello	Ken Annakin
1970	Un caso di coscienza	Salvatore Vaccagnino	Giovanni Grimaldi
1970	Il debito coniugale	Orazio	Franco Prosperi
1970	Fermate il mondo...voglio scendere!	Ricky Ceciarelli	Giancarlo Cobelli
1970	When Women Had Tails	Kao	Pasquale Festa Campanile
1970	The Swinging Confessors	Don Salvatore	Marco Vicario
1970	La prima notte del Dottor Danieli, industriale col complesso del... giocattolo	Carlo Danieli	Giovanni Grimaldi
1970	Nel giorno del Signore	Pietro	Bruno Corbucci
1971	The Blonde in the Blue Movie	Rosario Trapanese	Steno
1971	Man of the Year	Michele Cannaritta	Marco Vicario
1971	Secret Fantasy	Niccolò Vivaldi	Pasquale Festa Campanile
1971	The Beasts	Various characters	Giovanni Grimaldi
1972	The Eroticist	Giacinto "Gianni" Puppis	Lucio Fulci
1972	When Women Lost Their Tails	Ham	Pasquale Festa Campanile
1972	Il sindacalista	Saverio Ravizzi	Luciano Salce
1972	La calandria	Lidio	Pasquale Festa Campanile
1972	L'uccello migratore	Andrea Pomeraro	Steno
1973	My Darling Slave	Demetrio Cultrera	Giorgio Capitani
1973	Il magnate	Furio Cicerone	Giovanni Grimaldi
1973	Io e lui	Rico	Luciano Salce
1974	L'arbitro	Carmelo Lo Cascio	Luigi Filippo D'Amico
1974	Il domestico	Rosario "Sasà" Cabaduni	Luigi Filippo D'Amico
1975	Il fidanzamento	Luigi Mannozzi	Giovanni Grimaldi
1975	Il gatto mammone	Lollo Mascalucia	Nando Cicero
1975	Dracula in the Provinces	Cav. Costante Nicosia	Lucio Fulci
1976	San Pasquale Baylonne protettore delle donne	Giuseppe Cicerchia	Luigi Filippo D'Amico
1978	Travolto dagli affetti familiari	Memé Di Costanzo	Mauro Severino
1980	Prestami tua moglie	Alex Fortini	Giuliano Carnimeo
1982	I'm Going to Live by Myself	Giuseppe	Marco Risi
1987	Secondo Ponzio Pilato	Valerian	Luigi Magni
1994	Once a Year, Every Year	Giuseppe	Marco Risi
2000	Il segreto del giaguaro	Mazzaro	Antonello Fassari
2007	I Vicerè	Prince Giacomo	Roberto Faenza
2017	Chi salverà le rose?	Claudio	Cesare Furesi

=== Television ===
Year	Title	Role	Notes
1970	Signore e signora		
1988	Cinema		
1999	Cornetti al miele		
2003	Una famiglia per caso		
2005	Il cielo può attendere		
2005	Mio figlio		
2007	Clare and Francis		
2007	La baronessa di Carini		
2010	Lo scandalo della Banca Romana		
2010	Capri		season 3
2010	Io e mio figlio - Nuove storie per il commissario Vivaldi	Federico Vivaldi	
2012–2014	Il Restauratore	Basilio Corsi	season 1–2 (28 episodes)
2012	Terra ribelle – Il nuovo mondo	Alfredo Malagridas	season 2
2013	Donne in gioco		
2016	Ballando con le stelle		Ballando con le Stelle (series 11)
2017	Meglio tardi che mai		
2019	W Gli Sposi	Reverendo	
