= The Virgin of Nuremberg =

- Italian film poster for The Virgin of Nuremberg
- Directed by: Anthony Dawson
- Screenplay by: Anthony Dawson; Edmond T. Gréville; Renato Vicario
- Based on: La vergine di Normberga by Maddalena Gui
- Produced by: Marco Vicario
- Starring: Rossana Podestà; Georges Rivière; Christopher Lee
- Cinematography: Riccardo Pallottini
- Edited by: Otello Colangeli
- Music by: Riz Ortolani
- Production company: Atlantica Cinematografica
- Distributed by: Atlantica Cinematografica
- Release date: 15 August 1963 (Italy)
- Running time: 83 minutes
- Country: Italy
- Box office: ₤125 million

The Virgin of Nuremberg (Italian: La vergine di Norimberga) (a.k.a. Horror Castle) is a 1963 Italian horror film directed by Anthony Dawson.

== Plot ==
Mary discovers that in the German castle of her husband someone has put into operation the machines of torture of the museum.

== Cast ==
- Rossana Podestà as Mary Hunter
- Georges Rivière as Max Hunter
- Christopher Lee as Erich
- Jim Dolen as John Selby, FBI Agent
- Lucile St. Simon as Hilde

== Production ==
The Virgin of Nuremberg was based on an Italian paperback novel La vergine di Normberga, issue #23 in the KKK series of Italian pulp paperback novels. These novels were part of a trend in Italy of cheap paperback novels that blended Gothic, horror and erotic styles. These titles claimed to be based on British authors where the real Italian authors were described as translators. The film's producer, Marco Vicario, was the co-founder of the company G.E.I. who published the KKK paperbacks. Margheriti changed elements of the plot of the story to include a war and surgery subplots. The film also removes some of the more extreme elements of the novel, such as a part where a man severs a woman's nerve before pulling out almost all of the bones from her body. The screenwriters of the film assumed pseudonyms. Many sources state that Ernesto Gastaldi was credited as Gastad Green, but he has denied contributing to the film's writing, stating he may have discussed plot elements with Margheriti, but did no actual writing. The official documents relating to the film's production credit Marco Vicario's brother Renato Vicario as Gastad Green. The film was shot after Margheriti's film Castle of Blood was shot in order to exploit its production values. The film was a rushed production and was shot in three weeks.

== Release ==
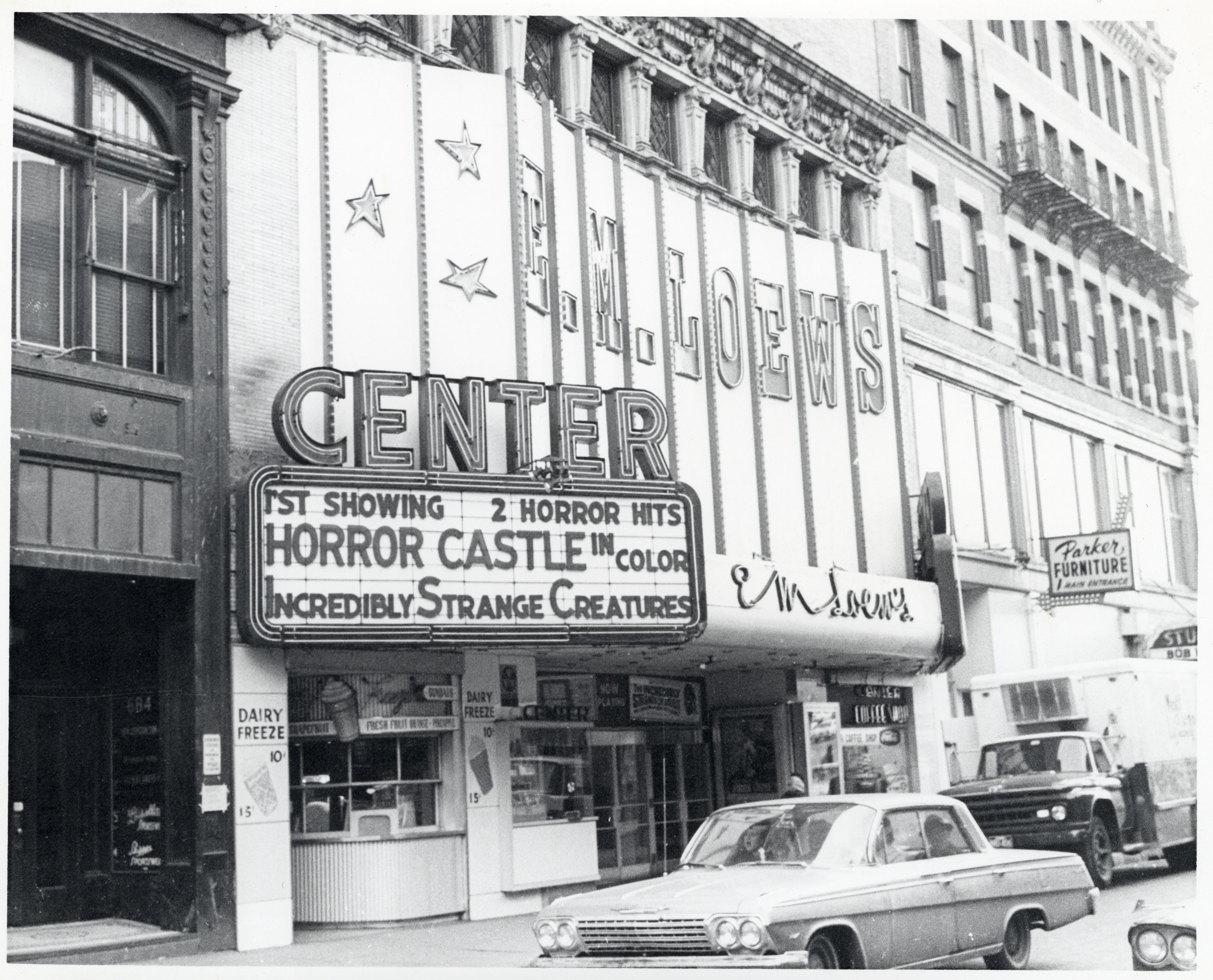
Film marquee in 1965 displaying the film as Horror Castle.

The Virgin of Nuremberg was director Antonio Margheriti's first horror film released in Italy. The Virgin of Nuremberg was released in Italy on 15 August 1963, where it was received theatrical distribution through Atlantica Cinematografica. The film grossed 125 million Italian lira in Italy. The film was released in Germany on 15 May 1964, where the war flashback scenes are removed and characters with German names are changed.

It was released in the United States with the title Horror Castle on 10 January 1965 through Zodiac Films.

== Reception ==
The Virgin of Nuremberg received poor reviews on its release in the United States. The New York Times referred to it as an "inept horror pic". The Monthly Film Bulletin compared the work negatively to another Italian horror film director, Riccardo Freda noting the lack of his visual flair. The film was praised however for atmospheric sets, a "handful of chilling moments" and editing which "never gives the action a moment's rest" finding that the film "adds up to a highly enjoyable piece of nonsense". Arthur D. Murphy of Variety declared the film "tedious and ridiculous" stating that "apart from a few murky scenes, color quality is fine. Technical credits are quite good, but the story premise was handled ineptly."

In a retrospective review, Danny Shipka, author of Perverse Titillation: The Exploitation Cinema of Italy, Spain and France, 1960–1980 waiting through the films to find the identity of the red-hooded figure "is worth it, especially if you like cold violence, as Margheriti pushes the limits with his tortures".

== See also ==
- Christopher Lee filmography
- List of horror films of 1963
- List of Italian films of 1963
