= Alone Against Rome =

1962 film

- Directed by: Luciano Ricci
- Screenplay by: Gianni Astolfi; Ernesto Gastaldi; Ennio Mancini
- Produced by: Marco Vicario
- Starring: Lang Jeffries; Rossana Podestà; Philippe Leroy
- Cinematography: Silvano Ippoliti
- Edited by: Roberto Cinquini
- Production companies: Atlantica Cinematografica Produzione Films; Film Servis
- Release date: September 1962 (Italy)
- Running time: 95 minutes
- Countries: Italy; Yugoslavia

Alone Against Rome (Italian: Solo contro Roma, also known as Vengeance of the Gladiators) is a 1962 peplum film directed by Luciano Ricci and starring Lang Jeffries and Rossana Podestà.

== Cast ==
- Lang Jeffries as Brennus
- Rossana Podestà as Fabiola
- Philippe Leroy as Sylla
- Gabriele Tinti as Goruk
- Luciana Angiolillo as Saron's Servant
- Giorgio Nenadovic as Centurion Caius
- Goffredo Unger as Old Christian
- Rinaldo Zamperla as Light Blond Prisoner

== Release ==
Alone Against Rome was released in September 1962 in Italy. It was later released in the United States in December 1963 with a 100-minute running time.

== Reception ==
In a contemporary review, the Monthly Film Bulletin described the film as a "lavishly staged" and "shot in pale, restrained colours, this Italian spectacle reduces dialogue to the minimum and concentrates on as varied a display of violent action as the most eager fan could wish for, ranging from ambushes in the forest to bloody underground revolutions and equally savage gladiatorial contests." The review noted that "one has to forget the vapid, dubbed dialogue, and lumbering acting (the one exception being Philippe Leroy's villainous, cold-eyed Silla)." The review also noted the second-unit director Riccardo Freda, noting that "The arena scenes, in particular, are directed with a fine sense of movement and camera style by Riccardo Freda, who has now joined that select band of second unit directors on whom this kind of film tends to rely."
