= Philippe Leroy =

French actor (1930–2024)

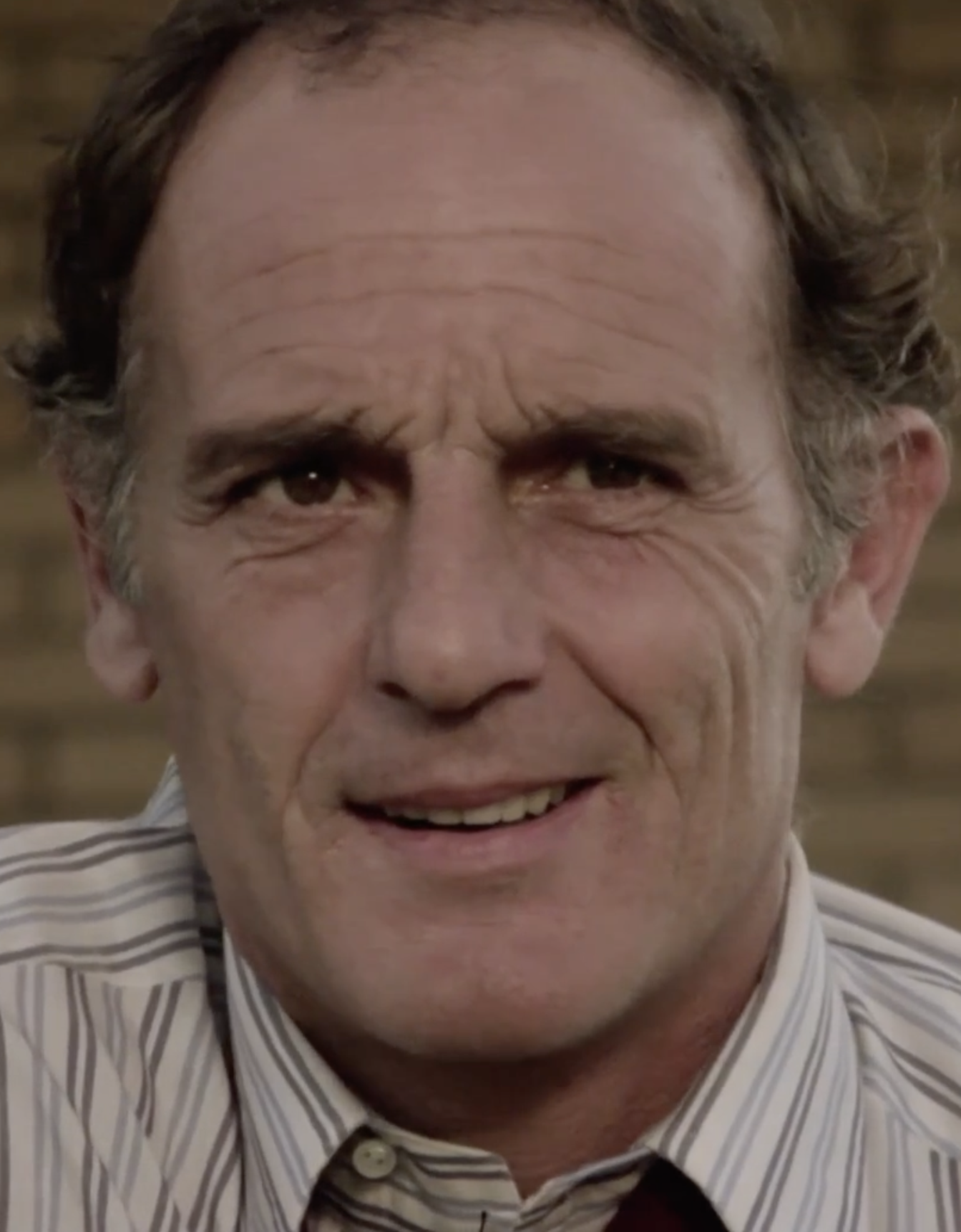
- Leroy in La nuora giovane (1975)
- Born: Philippe Leroy-Beaulieu; 15 October 1930; Paris, France
- Died: 1 June 2024 (aged 93); Rome, Italy
- Occupation: Actor
- Years active: 1960–2019
- Spouses: Françoise Laurent (divorced) Silvia Tortora (m. 1990; died 2022)
- Children: 3; including Philippine Leroy-Beaulieu
- Military career
- Allegiance: France
- Branch: French Foreign Legion
- Service years: 1953–1960
- Rank: Captain
- Commands: 2nd Foreign Parachute Regiment
- Conflicts: French Indochina War; Algerian War
- Awards: Chevalier Légion d'Honneur; Croix de la Valeur Militaire; Croix de Guerre des Theatres d'Operations Exterieurs; Medaille commemorative de la Campagne d'Indochine

Philippe Marie Paul Leroy-Beaulieu (15 October 1930 – 1 June 2024) was a French actor. He appeared in over 150 films between 1960 and 2019, and worked extensively in Italian cinema, as well as in his native country.

After an early career as a paratrooper in the French Foreign Legion, Leroy made his film debut at the age of 30 in Jacques Becker’s The Hole (1960), earning a BAFTA Award nomination for Best Foreign Actor. During the following two decades, he appeared in many films as both a leading man and a supporting player. He was nominated for a Primetime Emmy Award for Outstanding Lead Actor in a Limited Series or Movie for playing the title role in the Italian miniseries The Life of Leonardo da Vinci (1971).

Leroy also became well-known to television audiences for playing Yanez De Gomera in Sandokan (1976), based on the Emilio Salgari novels of the same name. Later in life, he played a recurring role on the long-running series Don Matteo. His last film role was at the age of 88.

He was also the father of actress Philippine Leroy-Beaulieu.

== Early life ==
Philippe Leroy-Beaulieu was born in Paris on 15 October 1930 to an aristocratic family; his ancestors included economist Pierre Paul Leroy-Beaulieu, historian Henri Jean Baptiste Anatole Leroy-Beaulieu, and architect Jean-François Leroy. At the age of 17, he started working on an ocean liner, and spent a year abroad in New York City. He worked several oddjobs, including as a sailor and a circus performer.

== Military service ==
In 1953, Leroy served as a paratrooper in the "18e régiment de chasseurs parachutistes" in the French Indochina War. He later became a reservist, and served in the Algerian War as a 2nd Lieutenant. He was awarded two decorations of the Chevalier of the Légion d'honneur, a Croix de guerre des théâtres d'opérations extérieures, and the Cross for Military Valour for his service. He retired as a captain.

== Acting career ==
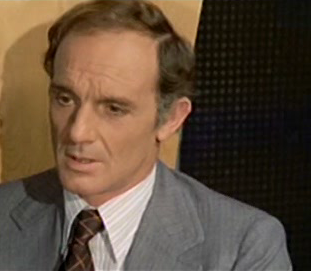
Leroy in Gang War in Milan (1973)

Leroy made his acting debut in 1960, starring as Manu Borelli in Jacques Becker’s last movie, the crime film The Hole, an adaptation of José Giovanni's 1957 book The Break. His performance won international recognition, and he was nominated for a BAFTA Award for Best Foreign Actor at the 15th British Academy Film Awards in 1962.

In 1961, Leroy moved to Italy; he subsequently met and became friends with film director Vittorio Caprioli and actress Franca Valeri, the former of whom offered him a role in his film Leoni al sole. In the same year, he also starred in Riccardo Freda's crime film Caccia all'uomo. After settling permanently in Italy, he went on to starr in various films, such as Gianfranco De Bosio's The Terrorist (1963), Marco Vicario's Seven Golden Men (1965), Liliana Cavani's The Night Porter (1974) and Luigi Comencini's The Cat. However, he also kept working in French productions, including Jean-Luc Godard's A Married Woman (1964) and Luc Besson's La Femme Nikita (1990).

He also rose to prominence for his involvement in several TV fictions, most notably including Renato Castellani's The Life of Leonardo da Vinci (1971), where he starred as the Italian polymath, and Sergio Sollima's Sandokan (1976), where he played the role of Yanez de Gomera.

In 2007, he starred in Dario Argento's Mother of Tears, the concluding installment of horror movie trilogy The Three Mothers; in 2019, he made his last film appearance in Gianfrancesco Lazotti's La notte è piccola per noi.

== Personal life ==
Leroy married Italian journalist Silvia Tortora in 1990; the couple stayed together until her death on 10 January 2022. They had two children; Philippe and Michelle. He also had another child, actress Philippine Leroy-Beaulieu, from a previous marriage.

In his later life, Leroy took up parachuting as a hobby. He was a member of the parachuting division of the SS Lazio sports club, as well as a supporter of their football team. In 2010, during the Rome Parashow, he celebrated his 80th birthday by jumping out of a plane. In April 2011, at the age of 81, he spent 12 days in Afghanistan with Italian paratroopers as a special correspondent.

=== Death ===
Leroy died in Rome on 1 June 2024, at the age of 93.

== Filmography ==
=== Film ===
- The Hole (1960)
- Chaque minute compte (1960)
- Spotlight on a Murderer (1961)
- Les filles sèment le vent (1961)
- The Italian Brigands (1961)
- Leoni al sole (1961)
- Caccia all'uomo (1961)
- Careless (1962)
- La loi des hommes (1962)
- Alone Against Rome (1962)
- The Shortest Day (1962)
- The Attic (1962)
- 55 Days at Peking (1963)
- Le Quatrième Sexe (1963)
- The Terrorist (1963)
- Shivers in Summer (1964)
- Il treno del sabato (1964)
- Love in Four Dimensions (1964, episode 3)
- White Voices (1964)
- Weeping for a Bandit (1964)
- Castle of the Living Dead (1964)
- A Married Woman (1964)
- Amore facile (1964, episode 2)
- Love and Marriage (1964, episode 2)
- Una storia di notte (1964)
- The Naked Hours (1964)
- The Possessed (1965)
- Seven Golden Men (1965)
- The Mandrake (1965)
- Seven Golden Men Strike Again (1966)
- A Maiden for a Prince (1966)
- The Almost Perfect Crime (1966)
- Yankee (1966)
- Che notte ragazzi! (1966)
- Lo scandalo (1966)
- Non faccio la guerra, faccio l'amore (1966)
- The Wild Eye (1967)
- La notte è fatta per... rubare (1968)
- The Libertine (1968)
- Buona Sera, Mrs. Campbell (1968)
- Ecce Homo (1968)
- Cuore di mamma (1969)
- His Day of Glory (1969)
- How, When and with Whom (1969)
- Unknown Woman (1969)
- The Laughing Woman (1969)
- Mr. Superinvisible (1970)
- Senza via d'uscita (1970)
- Cross Current (1971)
- Roma Bene (1971)
- Stanza 17-17 palazzo delle tasse, ufficio imposte (1971)
- Hector the Mighty (1972)
- Panhandle 38 (1972)
- Caliber 9 (1972)
- Naked Girl Killed in the Park (1972)
- Gang War in Milan (1973)
- The Black Hand (1973)
- R.A.S. (1973)
- The Bloody Hands of the Law (1973)
- Long Lasting Days (1973)
- Cebo para una adolescente (1974)
- The Night Porter (1974)
- Kidnap (1974)
- La svergognata (1974)
- Libera, My Love (1975)
- La nuora giovane (1975)
- Soldier of Fortune (1976)
- La linea del fiume (1976)
- Puttana galera! (1976)
- Mannaja (1977)
- Beyond Good and Evil (1977)
- The Cat (1977)
- La tigre è ancora viva: Sandokan alla riscossa! (1977)
- Quella strana voglia d'amare (1977)
- Gli ultimi angeli (1978)
- Covert Action (1978)
- Courage - Let's Run (1979)
- Il medium (1980)
- Qua la mano (1980)
- Tranquille donne di campagna (1980)
- Bello di mamma (1980)
- Peccato originale (1981)
- Il tango della gelosia (1981)
- Teste di quoio (1981)
- State buoni se potete (1983)
- Windsurf – Il vento nelle mani (1984)
- The Berlin Affair (1985)
- Juke box (1985)
- A Man and a Woman: 20 Years Later (1986)
- La donna del traghetto (1986)
- Incidente di percorso (1986)
- Montecarlo Gran Casinò (1987)
- Umi e, See You (1988)
- Don Bosco (1988)
- Deux (1989)
- Un uomo di razza (1989)
- Hiver 54, l'abbé Pierre (1989)
- La Femme Nikita (1990)
- The Man Inside (1990)
- L'Autrichienne (1990)
- Il volo di Teo (1990)
- Netchaïev est de retour (1991)
- The Return of Casanova (1992)
- Adelaide (1992)
- Alibi perfetto (1992)
- Berlin '39 (1993)
- Mario and the Magician (1994)
- Io e il re (1995)
- In Love and War (1996)
- L'ombre du pharaon (1996)
- Cous-cous (1996)
- Le déménagement (1997)
- The Fish in Love (1999)
- The Town Is Quiet (2000)
- Un giudice di rispetto (2000)
- Teste di cocco (2000)
- Vajont (2001)
- Apri gli occhi e... sogna (2002)
- Joy – scherzi di gioia (2002)
- The Accidental Detective (2003)
- Five Moons Square (2003)
- The Giraffe's Neck (2004)
- The Mother of Tears (2007)
- The Rage (2008)
- Blood of the Losers (2008)
- Le Premier Cercle (2009)
- Nient'altro che noi (2009)
- Vorrei averti qui (2010)
- La strada di Paolo (2011)
- Breve storia di lunghi tradimenti (2012)
- It's All About Karma (2017)
- Chi salverà le rose? (2017)
- Una gita a Roma (2017)
- Hotel Gagarin (2018)
- La notte è piccola per noi (2019)

=== Television ===
- Le rouge et le noir (1961)
- The Life of Leonardo da Vinci (1971, 5 episodes)
- Sandokan (1976, 6 episodes)
- La tigre è ancora viva: Sandokan alla riscossa! (1977)
- Giorno segreto (1978, 3 episodes)
- I racconti fantastici di Edgar Allan Poe (1979, 4 episodes)
- Sam & Sally (1980, 1 episode)
- ...e la vita continua (1984, 8 episodes)
- Il corsaro (1985)
- Quo Vadis? (1985, 2 episodes)
- Kamikaze (1986)
- Il generale (1987, 2 episodes)
- Due assi per un turbo (1987, 12 episodes)
- Treasure Island in Outer Space (1987, 5 episodes)
- Eurocops (1991, 1 episode)
- Due vite, un destino (1993)
- Commissaire Moulin (1993, 1 episode)
- Lie Down with Lions (1994)
- Moses (1995)
- Noi siamo angeli (1997, 1 episode)
- Nessuno escluso (1997)
- Une femme d'honneur (1997–1999, 2 episodes)
- Ritornare a volare (1998)
- Navarro (1999, 1 episode)
- Un maresciallo in gondola (2002)
- Cinecittà (2003)
- Elisa di Rivombrosa (2003–2004, 4 episodes)
- Father of Mercy (2004)
- Imperium: Saint Peter (2005)
- Don Matteo (2008–2009, 7 episodes)
- Inspector Coliandro (2009, 1 episode)
- I Cesaroni (2012, 1 episode)
- Meraviglie (2018, 1 episode)
