= Seven Men and One Brain =

- Italian film poster
- Directed by: Rossano Brazzi; Ted Kneeland
- Written by: Rossano Brazzi (story); Sandro Continenza (dialogue); Marcello Coscia (dialogue)
- Produced by: Rossano Brazzi
- Starring: Ann-Margret; Rossano Brazzi; Barbara Nichols
- Cinematography: Stelvio Massi; Ricardo Younis
- Music by: Carlo Rustichelli; Bruno Nicolai (arranger)
- Production companies: Chiara Film Internazionali; Lam Pie Film
- Release dates: 17 October 1968 (Argentina); 13 May 1969 (Italy)
- Running time: 106 minutes
- Country: Italy
- Languages: Italian; English; Spanish

Seven Men and One Brain (Italian: 7 uomini e un cervello), also known as Criminal Affair and Criminal Symphony, is a 1968 Italian-Argentinian crime comedy heist film co-written, produced, directed by and starring Rossano Brazzi, in one of his few non-singing roles. It also stars Ann-Margret, Barbara Nichols, Hélène Chanel, Gina Maria Hidalgo, Lando Buzzanca, Juan Carlos Lamas, Javier Portales and Nathán Pinzón.

== Synopsis ==
Criminologist Ross Simpson seems to have everything that a man could seemingly desire: the respect of his university peers and students, a successful career as an author, and a secret identity and romance with his young student Leticia. The only thing Simpson doesn't have is a large amount of money, which he wants to get by using his secret identity and planning what he regards as "perfect crimes". Nevertheless, all of them fail due to the stupidity and bumbling actions of the criminals he recruits to carry out his secret schemes. One day Simpson's publishers send him on an all-expenses-paid trip to Buenos Aires, which includes accommodation and an attractive secretary. Putting his writing on hold, Simpson schemes to rob the patrons of the famous Teatro Colón during the opening performance of the classic opera La traviata, all the while using a gang of Argentinian criminals who are trained to sing. Things begin to go awry when Simpson is simultaneously pursued by the angry Italian criminals who failed one of his Italian jobs and a variety of attractive women who seem to get in his way.

== Cast ==
- Rossano Brazzi as Ross Simpson
- Ann-Margret as Leticia
- Barbara Nichols as Miss Archillar
- Hélène Chanel as Georgette
- Gina Maria Hidalgo as Ana Veronesi
- Lando Buzzanca as Esteban de Flori
- Mimma Biscardi
- Renzo Petretto as Crook
- Osvaldo Pacheco as José
- Alberto Dalbés as Schwartz (as Alberto D'Alves)
- Rafael Carret as Antonio (as Raphael Garret)
- Juan Carlos Lamas as Crook
- Javier Portales as Crook
- Augusto Codecá as Crook
- Alfonso Senatore as Crook
- Ricardo Castro Ríos as Crook
- Nathán Pinzón as Crook
- Roger Smith as a gambler

== Production ==
It was one of several films Ann-Margret made in Europe around this time.

== Release ==
The film was a box office bomb. It was released in the United States as Criminal Affair, in a version re-dubbed, re-edited and re-scored by the distributor.

== Reception ==
The film was generally badly received by critics. A contemporary review of La Prensa described the film as a ripoff of Big Deal on Madonna Street, "but Brazzi is no Monicelli or Gassman. The result is unbearable... the performers... are far below what they can give". Another contemporary review from L'Unità outlined the film as an annoying film and a poor imitation of Seven Golden Men, with a bleak story and a badly mistcast Brazzi ("an actor who can do everything but the gangster").
