= Seven Golden Men Strike Again =

1966 film by Marco Vicario

- Spanish film poster
- Italian: Il grande colpo dei sette uomini d'oro
- Directed by: Marco Vicario
- Screenplay by: Marco Vicario
- Story by: Marco Vicario
- Produced by: Marco Vicario
- Starring: Rossana Podestà; Philippe Leroy; Gastone Moschin; Giampiero Albertini; Maurice Poli; Manuel Zarzo; Gabriele Tinti; Dario De Grassi; Enrico Maria Salerno
- Cinematography: Ennio Guarnieri
- Edited by: Nino Baragli
- Music by: Armando Trovajoli
- Production companies: Atlantica Cinematografica Produzione; Franco London Film; Estela Films
- Distributed by: Arco Film (Italy); As Films (Spain)
- Release dates: 10 February 1966 (Netherlands); 25 October 1966 (Italy); 25 January 1967 (Spain); 15 May 1968 (France)
- Running time: 97 minutes
- Country: Italy; France; Spain
- Language: Italian

Seven Golden Men Strike Again (Italian: Il grande colpo dei sette uomini d'oro, lit. 'The Big Hit of the Seven Golden Men') is a 1966 heist comedy film written, produced, and directed by Marco Vicario. It is the sequel to his 1965 film Seven Golden Men. The cast features Rossana Podestà, Philippe Leroy, Gastone Moschin, Manuel Zarzo and Enrico Maria Salerno.

== Plot ==
The Seven Golden Men successfully pull off their gold heist at the Commercial Bank of Italy, but just as they are about to make their getaway, most of them are suddenly captured by US government agents. Albert and Giorgia escape, but later rejoin their comrades and strike a deal with the American agents.

The Seven Golden Men are assigned by the US government to kidnap the dictator general of a Latin American island nation who is allied with the Soviets and bring him in for questioning before he is to be surreptitiously returned to his home. Giorgia is sent ahead to facilitate the kidnapping. She is discovered and captured, all according to plan, and posing as an American journalist, she uses her charm to turn the General's head. After throwing the General's army into confusion, the Golden Men successfully pull off the operation. Upon interrogating him with a mind-reading device, the US officials find the General so thoroughly infatuated with Giorgia that he readily agrees to give up his allegiance with the Soviets and become an ally of the United States.

At the same time, the Golden Men - in a private side mission set by Albert - infiltrate the island and capture a Soviet cruiser carrying 7,000 tons of gold bullion for the General's intended revolution against the Americans. They ferry the gold to a deserted island for transfer, but Adolf, put in charge by the Professor, is seduced by greed and megalomania and together with Alfred turns against his comrades. Their private war over the gold is interrupted by the arrival of Albert and Giorgia, who voice their displeasure at their avarice, and a blockade by American warships coercing them into giving up their loot. With an ingenious trick, the Golden Men manage to spirit most of the gold away to Geneva, but once again Albert intends to cheat his associates out of their share, as does Giorgia alongside the General, who is now in exile. But when the two arrive at the bank where Albert has stored the gold, they find the Golden Men at work breaking into the bank once more, since the gold was confiscated by the UNO and so they have to get it back the old-fashioned way.

== Cast ==
- Philippe Leroy as Albert, "the Professor"
- Rossana Podestà as Giorgia
- Gastone Moschin as Adolf, the German
- Giampiero Albertini as August, the Portuguese
- Maurice Poli as Alfred, the Frenchman
- Manuel Zarzo as Alfonso, the Spaniard
- Gabriele Tinti as Aldo, the Italian
- Dario De Grassi as Anthony, the Irishman
- Enrico Maria Salerno as the President General
- Luis Marín as Lieutenant
- Ennio Balbo as Soviet Captain
- Geoffrey Copleston as Frank Rogers
- Jacques Herlin as Army Captain
- Antonio Molino Rojo as Submarine Commander
- Lars Bloch and Gérard Herter as Submarine Officers
- Ignazio Spalla as Marine Patrol Captain
- John Bartha as Police Inspector
- Walter Williams as CIA Agent
