= L'uccello migratore =

- Directed by: Steno
- Written by: Raimondo Vianello; Giulio Scarnicci
- Starring: Lando Buzzanca; Rossana Podestà
- Cinematography: Ennio Guarnieri
- Edited by: Raimondo Crociani
- Music by: Armando Trovajoli
- Distributed by: Medusa
- Release date: 1972
- Country: Italy
- Language: Italian

L'uccello migratore (The migratory bird) is a 1972 Italian comedy film directed by Steno and starring Lando Buzzanca and Rossana Podestà.

== Plot ==
Andrea Pomeraro is a history teacher from CastroPietro, Sicily. During an outdoor lesson he receives a letter from his uncle, a politician who lives in Rome and who, thanks to his interest, managed to get him a transfer to the capital's high school.

Arrived on the spot, he meets his uncle who offers him an apartment, but on one condition: this must also act as an alcove for the faithful encounters of the same honorable, as he is married. In order to avoid inappropriate encounters, the two agree with a system: showing the Italian flag from the balcony means that the house is already occupied.

Andrea's first approach with his colleague Delia Benetti and the students is not happy, as he has replaced Professor Verdirame, much loved by the boys. Despite the warnings of Professor Delia, Andrea loses his temper and causes a sort of riot, being reprimanded by the principal.

Andrea is fascinated by Delia's beauty, and in a favorable moment he tries an approach, but she rejects him. At the same time, however, the man is also attracted to one of his students, and when Delia realizes it, he unleashes jealousy on the girl: Andrea, realizing the fact, instinctively slaps Delia, without understanding why.

Meanwhile, the high school was stormed by students and became the headquarters of the student movement, at the head of which Andrea was elected. His apartment is also not spared and this creates other problems for him with his honorable uncle. Initially, Andrea's intention is only to take advantage of his pupil, but when she indulges in him sexually, she manages to immediately bring him to her side. Delia, however, is in love with Andrea and does not hesitate to have sex with one of her students, Aldo, in order to obtain from him a compromising document that could threaten her colleague's teaching position. But when Aldo tries to get his hands on her, she pretends to be thirsty and mistakenly drinks some petrol, fortunately without serious consequences.

Meanwhile, Andrea's uncle is put in a plaster cast after an accident; to repair the damage caused by his nephew, he offers Andrea an opportunity to get out of the situation unscathed: to sign a declaration in which he declares that he was forced to organize the riots in the high school under the threat of the students. Andrea refuses to do so, and is then sent back to Sicily.

== Cast ==
- Lando Buzzanca as Andrea Pomeraro
- Rossana Podestà as Delia Benetti
- Gianrico Tedeschi as n. Michele Pomeraro
- Olga Bisera as French lover of Pomeraro
- Pia Velsi as Mother of Delia Benetti
- Elizabeth Turner as Ingrid
- Ignazio Leone as Police Commissioner
- Ada Pometti as Nurse

== See also ==
- List of Italian films of 1972
