= Silvia Tortora =

Italian journalist (1962–2022)

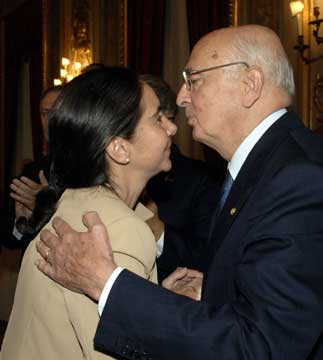
- Born: 14 November 1962; Rome, Italy
- Died: 10 January 2022 (aged 59); Rome, Italy
- Occupation: Journalist
- Spouse: Philippe Leroy (m. 1990)
- Children: 2

Silvia Tortora (14 November 1962 – 10 January 2022) was an Italian journalist.

== Career ==
Tortora was the daughter of journalist and TV presenter Enzo Tortora and his second wife Miranda Fantacci and the elder sister of Gaia Tortora. Starting in 1985, she collaborated with Giovanni Minoli at Mixer and from 2004, she collaborated on the program La storia siamo noi, again with Minoli. She worked on the weekly magazine Epoca from 1988 to 1997. In 1999, she won the silver ribbon at the Taormina Film Fest as "best cinematographic subject" with the film A Respectable Man by Maurizio Zaccaro. In 2002, she edited the book Cara Silvia, published by Marsilio Editori and in 2006, she published Bambini cattivi, also published by Marsilio Editori.

=== La storia siamo noi and Big ===
In the program La storia siamo noi, Tortora appeared in various episodes concerning: Mia Martini, Renato Vallanzasca, The Earthquake in San Giuliano di Puglia, Francesco Totti, Vendute (story of baby prostitutes), C'era una volta Portobello (the story of a program and of a man, Enzo Tortora), Corrado (the great inventor of La Corrida), La prima vittima (story of Luigi Calabresi), and Non ci resta che Benigni (story of the Tuscan comedian). Starting from June 2009, she hosted Big together with Annalisa Bruchi, broadcast on Raitre in eight episodes, starring Mario Monicelli, Giulio Andreotti, Giampaolo Pansa, Renzo Arbore, Mariangela Melato, Umberto Veronesi, Andrea Camilleri and Giovanni Minoli.

== Personal life and death ==
On 1 September 1990, Tortora married the French actor Philippe Leroy with whom she had two children, Philippe and Michelle. She died at a clinic in Rome, on 10 January 2022, at the age of 59.
