= Charlotte (1974 film) =

- French film poster
- La jeune fille assassinée
- Directed by: Roger Vadim
- Screenplay by: Roger Vadim
- Produced by: Claude Capra; Jean-Roch Rognoni
- Starring: Mathieu Carrière; Sirpa Lane; Roger Vadim
- Cinematography: Pierre William Glenn
- Music by: Mike Oldfield
- Production companies: Gerico Sound; Paradox Production; Sedimo; Claude Capra; T.I.T. Filmproduktion GmbH
- Distributed by: C.F.D.C. - Compagnie Française de Distribution Cinématographique
- Release date: 27 November 1974 (Paris)
- Countries: France; West Germany; Italy

Charlotte or The Murdered Young Girl (French: La jeune fille assassinée) is a 1974 erotic crime thriller film directed by Roger Vadim. It stars Sirpa Lane, Michel Duchaussoy, and Mathieu Carrière. The film is about a nymphomaniac.

== Cast ==
- Sirpa Lane as Charlotte Marley
- Michel Duchaussoy as Serge
- Mathieu Carrière as Eric von Schellenberg
- Roger Vadim as Georges Viguier
- Alexandre Astruc as Guy, the editor
- Anne-Marie Deschodt as Eliane
- Élisabeth Wiener as Elisabeth
- Thérèse Liotard as Louise
- Sabine Glaser as Agnès
- Anthony Steffen as Prince Sforza

== Release ==
Charlotte was released in Paris on 27 November 1974. The film had 497,542 admissions in France.

== Reception ==
Although it was a commercial success, it was disapproved of by many critics. New York Magazine called it an "arrogant piece of vacuous pornography", and added "if anyone had any doubts about Vadim's utter worthlessness this irritatingly pseudointellectual garbage should allay them".
