= Melissa Chimenti =

Italian actress and singer

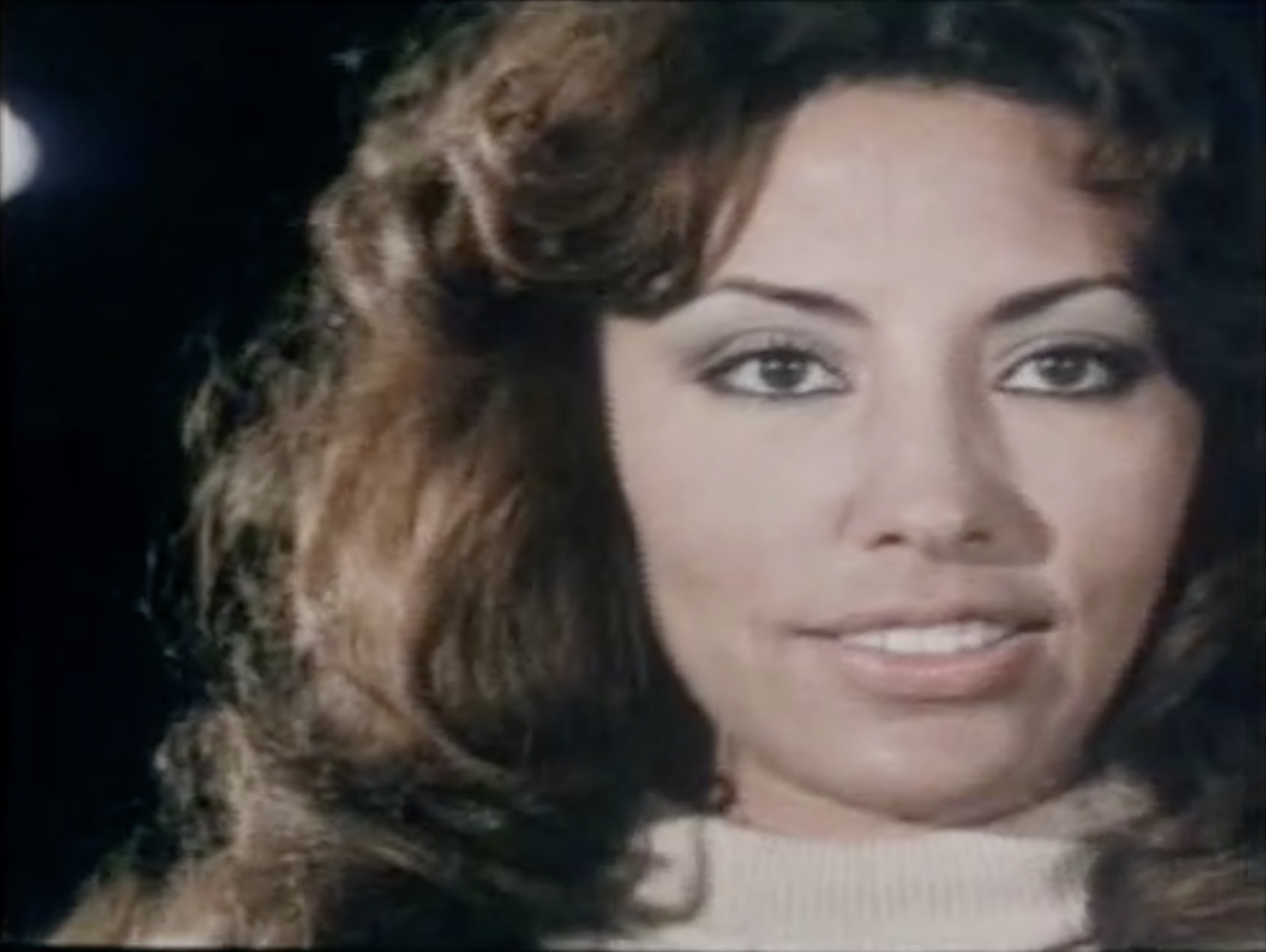
- Chimenti in 1973
- Born: Maria Rosa Chimenti; 1948 (age 76–77); Asmara, British Military Administration in Eritrea
- Occupation: Actress

Melissa Chimenti (born 1948 as Maria Rosa Chimenti) aka Melissa, is an Italian actress and singer. Her father was Italian and her mother was Eritrean. Her best-known role is Papaya in the film Papaya, Love Goddess of the Cannibals, directed by Joe D'Amato.

== Discography ==
=== Singles ===
- 1968: La spiaggia è vuota/Le fragole (Decca, FI 713)
- 1969: Ricordati di me/Tam tam (Parade, PRC 5069)
- 1969: Balla ancora insieme a me/Ricordati di me (Parade, PRC 5078)
- 1971: Apparizione/Dove muore la città (Produttori Associati, PA/NP 3178)
- Luglio 1973: Quel sorriso nelle sue mani/Che fai! (Erre, RR 3062)
- 1980: Un po' gay/Jimmy (Blitz Record, BLZ 021)
- 1985: Deliverer of my mind (Vocal version)/Deliverer of my mind (Instrumental version) (Full Time Records, FTM 31567; recorded as Kwin Melissa)
- 1986: Egyptian ring/Bad loser (Five Record, FM NP 13123; recorded as Kwin Melissa)

== Filmography ==
- Le mille e una notte... e un'altra ancora!, by Enrico Bomba (1972)
- Rivelazioni di uno psichiatra sul mondo perverso del sesso, by Renato Polselli (1973)
- Chino (1973)
- Farfallon (1974)
- Carambola! (1974)
- Papaya, Love Goddess of the Cannibals (also known as Papaya dei Caraibi), by Joe D'Amato (1978) (credited as Melissa)
- Gardenia, il giustiziere della mala (1979)
