= Papaya, Love Goddess of the Cannibals =

- Italian theatrical release poster
- Directed by: Joe D'Amato
- Written by: Roberto Gandus
- Starring: Melissa Chimenti; Sirpa Lane; Maurice Poli
- Music by: Stelvio Cipriani
- Distributed by: Severin Films (US DVD)
- Release date: 1978
- Running time: 86 minutes
- Country: Italy
- Language: Italian

Papaya, Love Goddess of the Cannibals (Italian title: Papaya dei Caraibi) is a 1978 Italian cannibal film directed by Joe D'Amato. It was written by Roberto Gandus and stars Melissa Chimenti in the title role, opposite Sirpa Lane as Sara.

== Plot ==
On a Caribbean island, a nuclear power plant is to be erected against the will of the natives. The islanders defend themselves against the plan, rallying a small secret resistance group under the guidance of their love goddess Papaya, a tropical beauty. This gradually ensnares the engineers of the project with the aim of gathering information about the planned power plant. Then the engineers are brutally murdered, involving an act of cannibalism.

In this exotic paradise, sociocritical journalist Sara spends her holidays. By chance, she gets to meet the engineer Vincent, who is involved in the construction of the power plant. The two are unaware of the bloody goings-on, and on a small excursion meet Papaya. The seemingly friendly locals lure the couple to a traditional ceremony called "Celebration of the Red Stone" where the two are administered drugs and made docile.

Days later, Sara is abducted by two perpetrators of the organisation. From these she learns that Vincent is to be murdered and she herself to be spared to report on the suppression of the inhabitants. While Vincent surrenders to Papaya completely and is later murdered, Sara falls for the male leader of the rebels and begins a passionate sexual relationship with him. This love affair awakens the jealousy of the bisexual Papaya, who seduces Sara into another tender and erotic romance. At the end of the film, the organisation succeeds in winning Sara for their cause.

== Cast ==
- Melissa Chimenti as Papaya (as Melissa)
- Sirpa Lane as Sara
- Maurice Poli as Vincent
- Dakar as Ceremony Leader (uncredited)

== Reception ==
A 2024 review in Nerdly described Papaya, Love Goddess of the Cannibals as "a hazy, dreamlike film that oscillates between softcore pornography and body horror, with gore scenes that are more suggestive than explicit, especially in comparison to the notorious cannibal subgenre that Italian cinema was embracing at the time".

== See also ==
- Camp (style)
- List of films considered the worst
