= Chino (1973 film) =

1973 film directed by John Sturges

- US theatrical release poster
- Directed by: John Sturges (Note: Duilio Coletti listed as co-director on some European prints.)
- Screenplay by: Clair Huffaker
- Based on: The Valdez Horses (1967 novel) by Lee Hoffman
- Produced by: John Sturges
- Starring: Charles Bronson; Jill Ireland
- Cinematography: Armando Nannuzzi
- Edited by: Luis Álvarez; Vanio Amici
- Music by: Guido De Angelis; Maurizio De Angelis
- Production companies: Produzioni De Laurentiis; Coral Producciones Cinematográficas; Universal Productions France
- Distributed by: Titanus (Italy); Intercontinental Releasing Corporation (U.S.); Cinema International Corporation (international)
- Release dates: September 14, 1973 (Italy); January 10, 1974 (France); August 12, 1974 (Spain); August 6, 1975 (U.S.)
- Running time: 98 minutes
- Country: Italy; United States; France; Spain
- Language: English

Chino (Italian: Valdez, il mezzosangue, lit. 'Valdez, the half-breed', also released as The Valdez Horses) is a 1973 Spaghetti Western film directed and produced by John Sturges, written by Clair Huffaker, and starring Charles Bronson, Jill Ireland, Marcel Bozzuffi, and Vincent Van Patten. It is based on the 1967 novel The Valdez Horses by Lee Hoffman. The film was an international co-production between Italy, the United States, France, and Spain.

== Plot ==
Chino Valdez is a lonely horse breeder, whose life is thrown into turmoil when a young runaway turns up at his door looking for work and, later, he falls in love with a beautiful woman whose brother hates him.

== Cast ==
- Charles Bronson as Chino Valdez
- Jill Ireland as Catherine Maral
- Marcel Bozzuffi as Maral
- Vincent Van Patten as Jamie Wagner
- Fausto Tozzi as Cruz
- Ettore Manni as Sheriff
- Corrado Gaipa as Padre
- Melissa Chimenti as Indian Girl
- José Nieto as Mexican
- Bruno Boschetti as Ricardo
- Luis Prendes as Barman

== Production ==
The film is based on the 1967 novel The Valdez Horses by Lee Hoffman, which won the 1967 Western Writers of America Spur Award.

Lino Ventura was originally cast as Maral, but left the project after realizing his role was too small and lacked enough substance. Location shooting for the exteriors took place in Almería, with interior scenes filmed in Rome. Financing came mainly from Dino De Laurentiis' company and French investors.

Director John Sturges was unhappy with the finished film and considered the casting of Jill Ireland a fatal mistake. Six months after finishing the movie, producer Dino De Laurentiis gathered the actors and crew to return for re-shoots and inserts. With Sturges no longer available, veteran Italian director Duilio Coletti was hired to complete the work. His name is listed as co-director on some European prints as a result.

== Release ==
The film was released in Italy on September 14, 1973, and in France on January 10, 1974.

In the United States, the film did not screen until August 6, 1975, when it screened in Phoenix, Arizona. It received a wide-release by International Releasing Corporation on July 14, 1976.

== Reception ==
=== Critical response ===
Time Out magazine said of the film, "Bronson suffers from galloping symbolism as Valdez, a wild horse-taming Mexican halfbreed representing different things to different people. Overall, he is the mustang, caught in a wild West which is being tamed and fenced in by white settlers... Despite a few dodgy moments when one really fears for Valdez' co-optability by Ireland's well-kept fragility, the film maintains its contradictory stance right through to a bitter-sweet ending. Valdez leaves, sans wife, sans house, but on his own terms, and after ensuring that if he can not tame the wild horses no one else will.
