= The Life of Leonardo da Vinci =

- Italian 1977 poster
- Genre: Historical drama
- Created by: Renato Castellani
- Starring: Philippe Leroy
- Narrated by: Giulio Bosetti (and onscreen presenter)
- Theme music composer: Roman Vlad
- Country of origin: Italy
- Original language: Italian

Production
- Running time: 270 min (five 54-minute episodes)
- Production companies: RAI; Televisión Española; ORTF; Istituto Luce

Original release
- Release: 24 October 1971 (Italy)

La Vita di Leonardo da Vinci — in English, The Life of Leonardo da Vinci — is a 1971 Italian miniseries created by Renato Castellani. The series is based largely on a biography in Giorgio Vasari's Le vite de' più eccellenti pittori, scultori e architettori.

== Synopsis ==
The life and development of Leonardo da Vinci are presented and analyzed with lingering myths being addressed and laid to rest along the way.

== Cast ==
- Philippe Leroy as Leonardo da Vinci
- Riad Gholmie as Francis I of France
- Giampiero Albertini as Ludovico Sforza
- Renzo Rossi as Sandro Botticelli
- Bruno Cirino as Michelangelo
- Marta Fischer as Isabella of Aragon
- Enrico Osterman as Niccolò Machiavelli
- Mario Molli as Andrea del Verrocchio
- Carlo Simoni as Francesco Melzi
- Bianca Toccafondi as Isabella d'Este
- Bruno Piergentili as Salaì (Gian Giacomo Caprotti)

== Production ==
This was written and directed by Renato Castellani and produced by RAI, Televisión Española, ORTF and Istituto Luce. Everything was filmed entirely on location in Italy and France.

The final credits feature Ornella Vanoni singing Leonardo's famous aphorism, put to music by Romanian composer Roman Vlad as "La canzone di Leonardo."

== Release ==
DVD cover (2003)

In Italy, the series was broadcast in five episodes from October 24 to November 21, 1971, on Programma Nazionale. It was made in color, even though the Italian government had not yet adopted this technique. Later, CBS distributed the series in the United States with English-language dubbing, airing it on Sunday nights from August 13, 1972, to September 10, 1972. In Quebec, the series was broadcast from September 7, 1973, on Radio-Canada Television, and in France from May 2, 1974, on the second channel of ORTF and rebroadcast in April 1980 on the first channel.

Italy officially began rebroadcasts in color in 1977.

=== Dubbing error ===
In the English-dubbed narration, Milan is said to have fallen in 1499 to Louis VII (reigned 1137–1180) instead of XII (reigned 1498–1515).

== Awards and nominations ==
The Life of Leonardo da Vinci was the first wholly non-English language series to win a Golden Globe and be nominated to an Outstanding Series category; the latter not repeated until Squid Game.

Year	Award	Category	Nominee(s)	Result	Ref.
1973	Golden Globe Awards	Best Television Special		Won	
1973	Primetime Emmy Awards	Outstanding Drama/Comedy – Limited Episodes	RAI Radiotelevisione Italiana	Nominated	
1973	Primetime Emmy Awards	Outstanding Single Performance by an Actor in a Leading Role (Drama/Comedy – Limited Episodes)	Philippe Leroy	Nominated	

== Alternate titles ==
- Das Leben Leonardo da Vincis (West Germany; recut version)
- I, Leonardo (USA)
- The Life of Leonardo Da Vinci (USA)
- Léonard de Vinci (France)
- Жизнь Леонардо да Винчи (СССР)
- Животът на Леонардо да Винчи (Bulgaria)
- La vida de Leonardo Da Vinci (Venezuela)
- Leonardo Da Vinci élete (Hungary, 4 January 1974)

== See also ==
- Cultural references to Leonardo da Vinci
