= Signore e signora =

Italian sitcom

- Starring: Lando Buzzanca, Delia Scala
- Country of origin: Italy
- No. of seasons: 1
- No. of episodes: 7

Original release
- Network: Rai 1
- Release: January 10 – March 7, 1970

Signore e signora is an Italian sitcom.

== See also ==
- List of Italian television series
