= The Secret Nights of Lucrezia Borgia =

- Directed by: Roberto Bianchi Montero
- Written by: Ramón Llidó; Piero Regnoli
- Produced by: Armando Novelli
- Starring: Sirpa Lane; George Hilton; Marino Masé
- Cinematography: Angelo Lannutti
- Edited by: Cesare Bianchini
- Music by: Michael Serfran
- Production companies: Diasa P.C. D. I.E.F. Cinematografica
- Release date: 20 August 1982
- Running time: 85 minutes
- Countries: Italy; Spain
- Languages: Italian; Spanish

The Secret Nights of Lucrezia Borgia (Italian: Le notti segrete di Lucrezia Borgia, Spanish: Las noches secretas de Lucrecia Borgia) is a 1982 Italian-Spanish historical film directed by Roberto Bianchi Montero and starring Sirpa Lane, George Hilton and Willey Reynolds.

== Cast ==
- Sirpa Lane as Lucrezia Borgia
- George Hilton as Duccio
- Willey Reynolds as Cesare
- Marino Masé as The Duke
- María Salerno as Eugenia
- Tito García as Grinta
- Françoise Perrot as Celine
- Mario Novelli
- Bruno Di Luia
- Erigo Palombini
- Franco Daddi
- Rafael Fernández
- José Riesgo
- Patricia Bernart
- Mara Mateo
- Carmen Carrión

== Bibliography ==
- Thrower, Stephen (1999). Beyond terror: the films of Lucio Fulci. FAB Press. p. 291. ISBN 9780952926054.
