= Rossana Podestà =

Italian actress

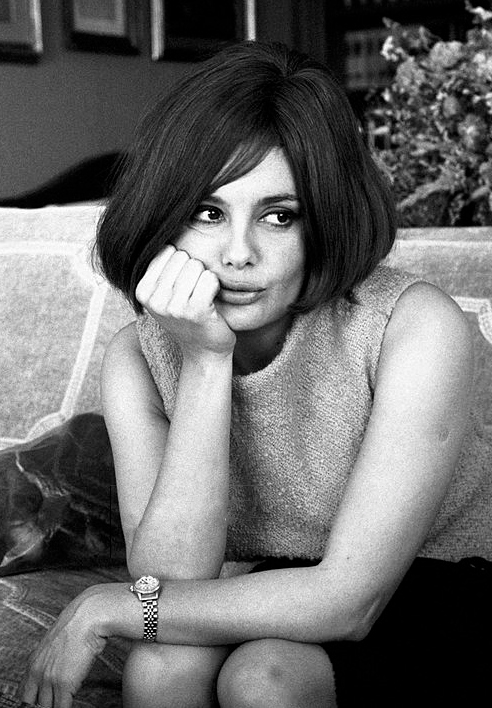
- Podestà in 1965
- Born: Carla Dora Podestà; 20 June 1934; Tripoli, Italian Libya
- Died: 10 December 2013 (aged 79); Rome, Italy
- Occupation: Actress
- Years active: 1950–1985
- Spouse: Marco Vicario (m. 1953; div. 1976)
- Partner: Walter Bonatti (1981–2011; his death)
- Children: 2

Rossana Podestà (born Carla Dora Podestà; 20 June 1934 – 10 December 2013) was an Italian actress who worked mainly in Italy from the 1950s to the 1970s.

== Biography ==
Podestà was born in Tripoli in the Italian colony of Libya. She spent her first years there, moving with her parents to Rome after World War II. At sixteen she was discovered by director Léonide Moguy during the preparation of the cast for the film Tomorrow Is Another Day; this inaugurated her film career. She participated in sixty films, both in Italy and abroad.

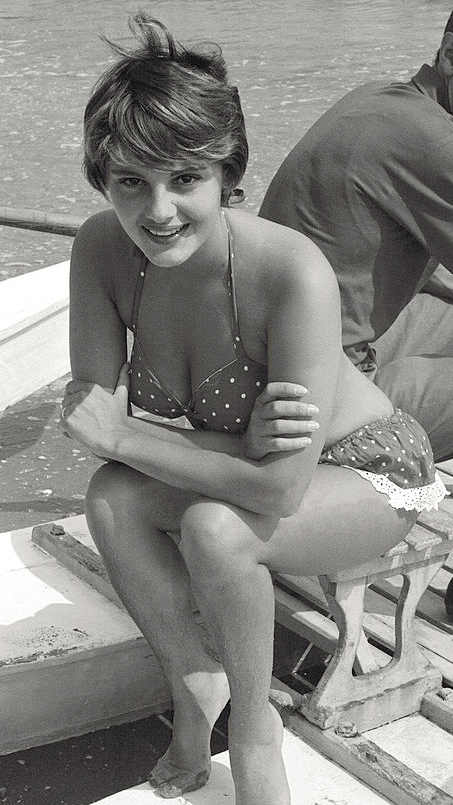
Podestà in 1956

=== Marriage ===
In Italy, she resided in Dubino (Sondrio province). She married movie producer Marco Vicario, and they later divorced. From 1980 she lived with Walter Bonatti, a journalist and mountain explorer. He died alone in 2011, aged 81, at a private clinic; its management would not allow his partner to be with him because the two were not married. On 10 December 2013, Podestà died in Rome, aged 79.

== Acting career ==
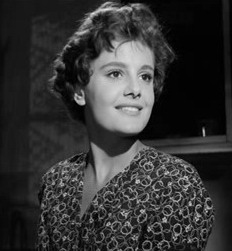
Podestà in Le ragazze di San Frediano (1954)

Podestà's most memorable role was as Helen in Helen of Troy, produced by Robert Wise in 1956. She could not speak English so she learned her lines by rote with a voice coach. The movie gave Podestà international exposure, and she performed alongside a young Brigitte Bardot. Thanks to her starring role in the Mexican film Rossana, she became very popular in Latin America.

Podestà also starred in Ulysses (1954), directed by Mario Camerini, and in the sixties and seventies she acted in some romantic movies, including The Sensual Man and The Swinging Confessors which led to a double page of five half-naked pictures in the US Playboy of March 1966. Under the headline "Trio Con Brio" featuring European actresses, she appeared alongside Christiane Schmidtmer (from Germany) and Shirley Anne Field (from the UK).

Her last performance was in Secrets Secrets (1985), directed by Giuseppe Bertolucci. She died on 10 December 2013.

== Selected filmography ==
- 1950: Strano appuntamento - Their daughter
- 1951: Tomorrow Is Another Day - Stefania
- 1951: The Seven Dwarfs to the Rescue - Princess Snow White
- 1951: Cops and Robbers - Liliana Bottoni
- 1952: Viva il cinema! - Marisa
- 1952: The Angels of the District - Lisa
- 1952: I, Hamlet - Ofelia
- 1952: The Phantom Musketeer - Ornella
- 1952: Don Lorenzo
- 1953: Viva la rivista!
- 1953: Finishing School - Pereira
- 1953: Addio, figlio mio! - Elsa
- 1953: Rossana - Rossana
- 1953: Voice of Silence
- 1954: Ulysses - Nausicaa
- 1955: Le ragazze di San Frediano - Tosca
- 1955: Nosotros dos - María Pedrosa
- 1955: Non scherzare con le donne
- 1955: Songs of Italy
- 1956: Helen of Troy - Helen
- 1956: Playa prohibida - Isabella
- 1956: Santiago - Doña Isabella
- 1958: The Amorous Corporal - Bethi
- 1958: Raw Wind in Eden - Costanza Varno
- 1958: The Sword and the Cross - Marta
- 1959: Temptation - Caterina
- 1959: Un vaso de whisky - María
- 1960: Fury of the Pagans - Leonora
- 1961: La grande vallata
- 1961: Slave of Rome - Antea
- 1962: Alone Against Rome - Fabiola
- 1962: The Golden Arrow - Jamila
- 1963: Sodom and Gomorrah - Shuah
- 1963: The Virgin of Nuremberg - Mary Hunter
- 1964: The Naked Hours - Carla
- 1964: Last Plane to Baalbek - Isabel Moore
- 1965: Seven Golden Men - Giorgia
- 1966: Seven Golden Men Strike Again - Giorgia
- 1970: The Swinging Confessors - Silvia
- 1971: Man of the Year - Cocò Lampugnani
- 1972: L'uccello migratore - Delia Benetti
- 1973: The Sensual Man - Lilia
- 1975: Il gatto mammone - Rosalia
- 1976: Sex Diary - Serena
- 1977: Pane, burro e marmellata - Simona
- 1979: 7 ragazze di classe - Ivonne
- 1980: Sunday Lovers - Clara (segment "Armando's Notebook")
- 1980: Tranquille donne di campagna - Anna Maldini
- 1983: Hercules - Hera
- 1985: Secrets Secrets - Maria, Rosa's Mother (final film role)
