= Maurice Poli =

French actor (1933–2020)

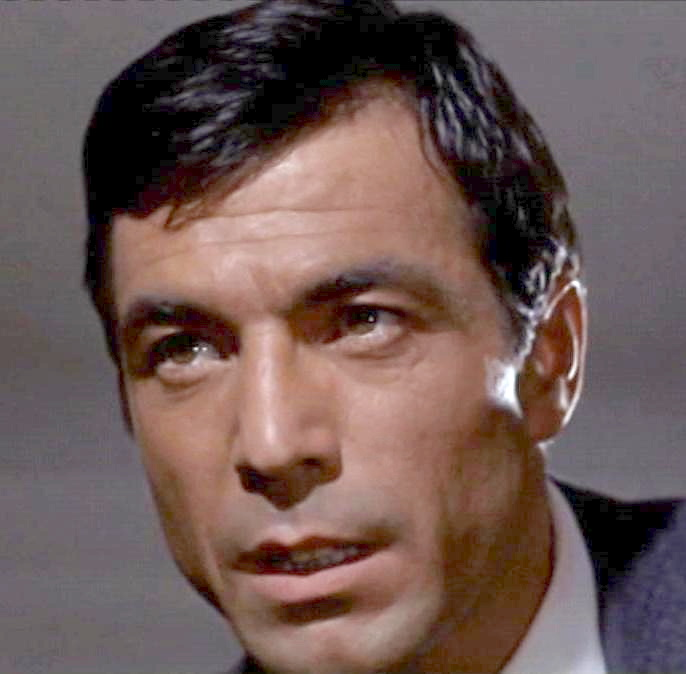
- Poli in Tom Dollar (1967)
- Born: Maurice Fernand Poli; 2 December 1933; Bizerte, French Tunisia (now Tunisia)
- Died: 26 April 2020 (aged 86); Rome, Italy
- Occupation: Actor

Maurice Fernand Poli (2 December 1933 – 26 April 2020) was a French actor, mainly active in Italian productions. He is regarded as one of the few actors to have taken part in virtually all the genres developed in Italy in over more than thirty years.

== Biography ==
Born in Bizerte, Tunisia, Poli made his film debut in 1961, in a very small role in Mauro Bolognini's The Lovemakers and as a French Resistance fighter in The Longest Day. He later alternated leading roles and supporting roles, being often cast as a tough guy or a villain.

He was also a TV star, taking a successful supporting role on Belle and Sebastian and the lead role on the short-lived spy series Frédéric le Gardian.

Following a fashion of the time for American-sounding stage names, in the second half of the 1960s he was credited Monty Greenwood in several Spaghetti Westerns.

After retiring, he took up residence in Rome, Italy and devoted himself to his lifelong hobbies of geology and archaeology.

== Selected filmography ==
- The Lovemakers (1961) - (uncredited)
- The Longest Day (1962) - Jean (uncredited)
- The Avenger (1962) - Mezensio, Turno's Henchman
- Sandokan the Great (1963) - Girobatol
- The Glass Cage (1965) - Antoine
- Seven Golden Men (1965) - Alfred
- Seven Golden Men Strike Again (1966) - Alfred
- Tom Dollar (1967) - Tom Dollar
- Two Faces of the Dollar (1967) - Miele / Honey / Django
- Shark! (1969) - Mario
- The Battle of the Damned (1969) - Corporal Marwell
- Gangster's Law (1969) - Rino Quintero
- Five Dolls for an August Moon (1970) - Nick Chaney
- Shango (1970) - Martinez
- The Last Traitor (1971) - Tim
- Baron Blood (1972) - Land Surveyor (uncredited)
- Le mille e una notte all'italiana (1972)
- Life Is Tough, Eh Providence? (1972) - Sheriff Keensburg
- Lo chiamavano Tresette... giocava sempre col morto (1973)
- White Fang (1973) - Mountie
- Lady Dynamite (1973)
- Rabid Dogs (1974) - Dottore
- Legend of the Sea Wolf (1975)
- Mimì Bluette... fiore del mio giardino (1976)
- Return of the 38 Gang (1977) - Maurice
- Papaya, Love Goddess of the Cannibals (1978) - Vincent
- Cindy's Love Games (1979) - Stefan
- La cameriera seduce i villeggianti (1980) - Il marsigliese
- Malombra (1984) - Osvaldo Raininger
- Il peccato di Lola (1984) - Necklace buyer
- Maladonna (1984) - Osvaldo Raininger
- Roma. L'antica chiave dei sensi (1984) - Ptolomeus
- The Assisi Underground (1985) - Vito
- Il piacere (1985) - Boris the stableman (uncredited)
- Mai con le donne (1985)
- Mercenari dell'apocalisse (1987) - The Reverent
- Penombra (1987) - Osvaldo Raininger
- Cobra nero (1987) - Chief Max Walker
- Urban Warriors (1987) - Stan
- Touch of Death (1988) - TV Newscaster #1 (uncredited)
- Non aver paura della zia Marta (1988) - Thomas the caretaker
- Fuoco incrociato (1988) - General Romero
- Miami Cops (1989)
- La vendetta (1989) - Milo (uncredited)
- La storia di Lady Chatterley (1989)
- Massacre (1989) - Frank
- Obsession - una storia di straordinaria follia (1989)
- Casa di piacere (1989) - Antique Dealer
- La mia preda (1990)
- Hansel e Gretel (1990) - Commissioner Roy
- Detective Malone (1991) - Chief Max Walker
- Sul filo del rasoio (1992) - Real-estate agent (uncredited)
- Return from Death (Frankenstein 2000) (1992) - Hoffner
- Rose rosse per una squillo (1993)
- Le occasioni di una signora per bene (1993)
- Delitti a luce rossa (1996) - Carlo
- Crazy Blood (2006) - Pietro
- Cruel (2014) - Gabriel Tardieu (final film role)
