= Man of the Year (1971 film) =

1971 film by Marco Vicario

- Directed by: Marco Vicario
- Written by: Marco Vicario; Piero Chiara
- Starring: Lando Buzzanca
- Cinematography: Tonino Delli Colli
- Music by: Armando Trovajoli
- Release date: 1971
- Country: Italy
- Language: Italian

Man of the Year (Italian: Homo Eroticus, also known as Husband, Italian Style) is a 1971 Italian commedia sexy all'italiana directed by Marco Vicario. The film was a blockbuster at the Italian box office.

== Plot ==
Michele Cannaritta is a Sicilian who moved to Bergamo apparently in search of work. He was actually kicked off the island for his insatiable sexual libido. Hired as a butler and driver by the Lampugnani family, his employer takes him to a doctor, who discovers Michele's physical peculiarity: triorchidism.

The news spreads like wildfire in the city among the friends and acquaintances of the Lampugnani couple. Michele can thus satisfy his sexual appetite with a series of ladies from the good Bergamo society, not without several problems and to the embarrassment of many.

Tired of the constant gossip and insinuations of her friends, Mrs. Lampugnani fires Michele. The man moves to the home of Carla, one of her friends, but it won't be his last move.

== Cast ==
- Lando Buzzanca: Michele Cannaritta
- Rossana Podestà: Cocò Lampugnani
- Luciano Salce: Achille Lampugnani
- Adriana Asti: Agnese Trescori
- Princess Ira von Fürstenberg: Moglie di Mezzini
- Bernard Blier: Doctor Mezzini
- Sylva Koscina: Carla
- Evi Marandi: Giusy
- Brigitte Skay: Cameriera
- Angela Luce: Cameriera
- Femi Benussi: Ersilia
- Sandro Dori: Ambrogio
- Michele Cimarosa: Tano Fichera
- Simonetta Stefanelli: daughter of Tano
- Paola Tedesco: friend of Cocò
- Greta Vajant: friend of Cocò
- Pia Giancaro: friend of Cocò
- Jacques Herlin: Professor Godè
- Piero Chiara: magistrate
