= Sirpa Lane =

Finnish actress (1952–1999)

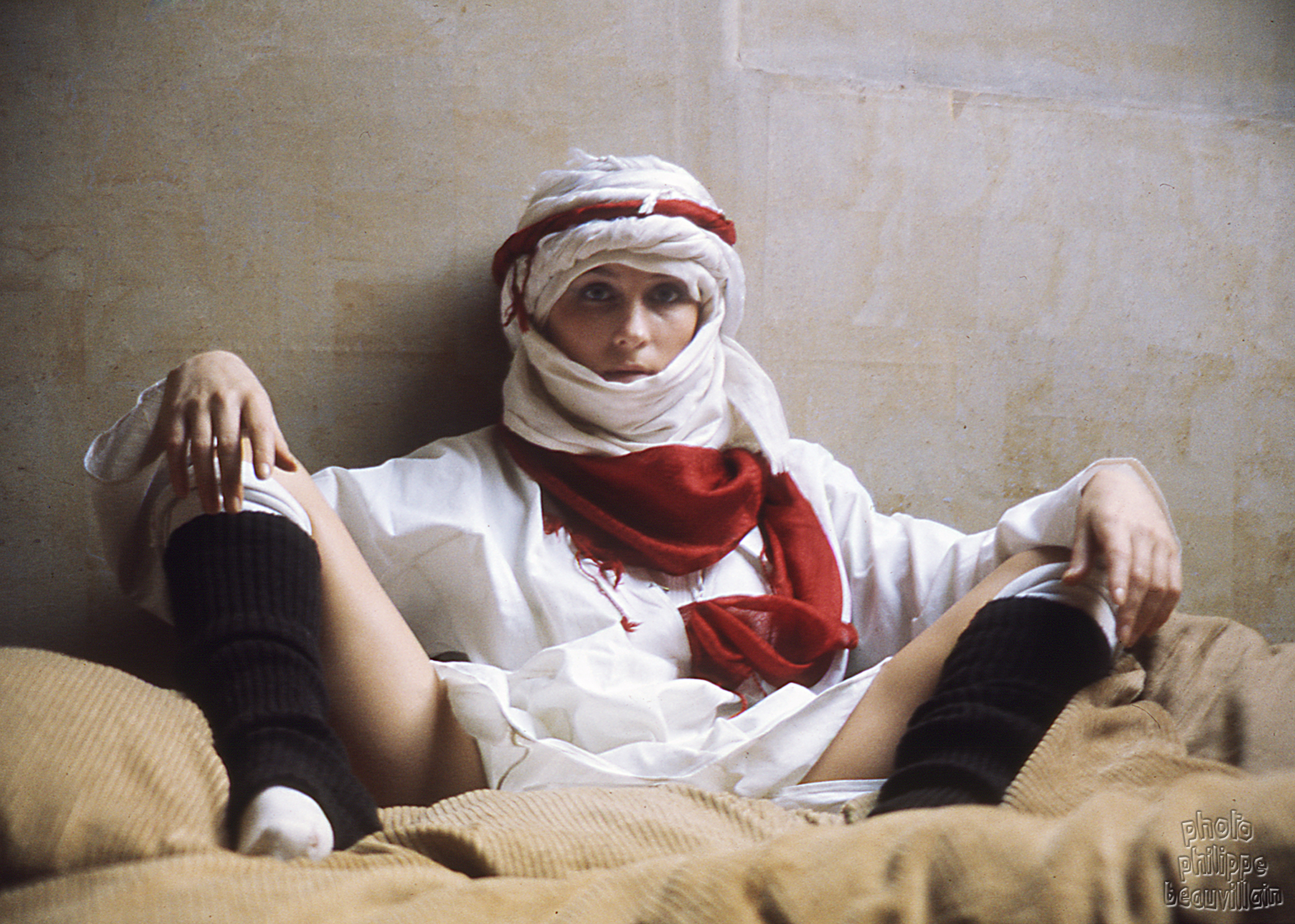
- Sirpa Lane, 1988
- Born: 31 January 1952; Turku, Finland
- Died: 1999 (aged 46–47); Formentera, Spain

Sirpa Lane, born Sirpa Salo (31 January 1952 – 1999), was a Finnish actress known for her work in B-movies of the 1970s, primarily erotic and exploitation films. Lane was discovered by British photographer and filmmaker David Hamilton, who was known for his soft focus and grainy style erotica. She worked with Roger Vadim, who spoke of her as the "next Bardot". She died of HIV/AIDS.

== Biography ==
Lane was born in Turku, Finland in 1952. She made her debut in the English film Fluff (1974), directed by Robert Paget. She had a relationship with Gilles Raysse, a business manager. She died of HIV/AIDS in Formentera, Spain in 1999.

== Filmography ==
- La jeune fille assassinée (The Assassinated Young Girl) (1974) a.k.a. Charlotte) as Charlotte Marley
- Fluff (1974)
- La Bête (The Beast) (1975) as Romilda de l'Esperance
- Nazi Love Camp 27 (a.k.a. La svastica nel ventre/ The Swastika on the Belly) (1977) as Hannah Meyer
- Malabestia (Evil Beast) (1978) as Ursula Drupp
- Papaya, Love Goddess of the Cannibals (1978) as Sara
- La bestia nello spazio (a.k.a. Beast in Space) (1980) as Lt. Sondra Richardson
- Trois filles dans le vent (Three Women in the Wind) (1981) as Sirpa Lane
- The Secret Nights of Lucrezia Borgia (a.k.a. Le notti segrete di Lucrezia Borgia) (1982) as Lucrezia Borgia
- Exciting Love Girls (a.k.a. Giochi carnali / Carnal Game) (1983) as Dr. Daniara / Daniela Mauri (final film role)
