= The Swinging Confessors =

1971 film by Marco Vicario

- Directed by: Marco Vicario
- Written by: Marco Vicario
- Starring: Lando Buzzanca; Rossana Podestà
- Cinematography: Sandro D'Eva
- Edited by: Nino Baragli
- Music by: Armando Trovajoli
- Release date: 1970
- Country: Italy
- Language: Italian

The Swinging Confessors (Italian: Il prete sposato), also known as Intimacy and The Married Priest, is a 1970 Italian comedy film written and directed by Marco Vicario.

== Plot ==
A young Sicilian priest who moved to Rome comes into contact with the upper class and receives constant sexual solicitations. He then falls in love with a prostitute and asks his superiors for permission to marry her while remaining a priest. But she understands that for him the priestly mission is everything and decides to leave him alone.

== Cast ==
- Lando Buzzanca: Don Salvatore
- Rossana Podestà: Silvia
- Salvo Randone: Don Clemente
- Magali Noël: Miss Bellini
- Luciano Salce: Monsignor Torelli
- Silvia Dionisio: Liliana Bellini
- Mariangela Melato: Prostitute
- Enrico Maria Salerno: Don Calogero
- Barbara Bouchet: Miss Marchio
- Karin Schubert: Blonde on bicycle
- Ely Galleani: Paola

== See also ==
- List of Italian films of 1970
