= Sardinia Kidnapped =

1967 film by Gianfranco Mingozzi

- Italian film poster
- Directed by: Gianfranco Mingozzi
- Screenplay by: Gianfranco Mingozzi; Ugo Pirro
- Produced by: Silvio Clementelli
- Starring: Franco Nero; Charlotte Rampling; Frank Wolff; Ennio Balbo; Pierluigi Aprà; Steffen Zacharias
- Cinematography: Ugo Piccone
- Edited by: Ruggero Mastroianni
- Music by: Riz Ortolani
- Production company: Clesi Cinematographica
- Distributed by: Euro International Films
- Release date: 14 March 1968
- Running time: 95 minutes
- Country: Italy
- Languages: Italian; English

Sardinia Kidnapped (Italian: Sequestro di persona, lit. "Kidnapping"), also known as Ransom in Sardinia, Island of Crime and Unlawful Restraint, is a 1968 Italian poliziottesco film directed by Gianfranco Mingozzi and starring Franco Nero, Charlotte Rampling and Frank Wolff.

== Plot ==
University student Francesco is kidnapped by bandits in Sardinia. His English tourist friend, Christina, a powerless witness to the kidnapping, rushes off to warn the family. Gavino, a childhood friend of Francesco's, advises Christina against talking to the police, but she does and the police begin searching for the kidnappers. In a firefight between gangsters and police, Francesco is killed, but the bandits hide his body. Meanwhile, Francesco's father offers to sell his lands to Osilio, a wealthy landowner, to get the money needed to pay the ransom for his son. Later, Gavino lets himself be seized by the bandits, and he convinces them that their leader is betraying and exploiting them. The bandits deliver their leader to Gavino, who recognizes him as Osilio. For Osilio there is no way out: the two men, together with Gavino, make their own justice.

== Cast ==
- Franco Nero as Gavino
- Charlotte Rampling as Christina Fisher
- Frank Wolff as Osilio
- Ennio Balbo as Mr. Marras
- Pierluigi Aprà as Francesco Marras
- Steffen Zacharias as Santulus Surgiu
- Margarita Lozano as Mrs. Marras
- Enzo Robutti
