= Addio, figlio mio! =

1953 film directed by Giuseppe Guarino

- Film poster
- Directed by: Giuseppe Guarino
- Starring: Marco Vicario
- Cinematography: Carlo Fiore
- Music by: Tarcisio Fusco
- Release date: 10 March 1953
- Country: Italy
- Language: Italian

Addio, figlio mio! ('Goodbye, my son!') is a 1953 Italian melodrama film written and directed by Giuseppe Guarino.

== Plot ==
Italy, World War II. Giorgio, second lieutenant of aviation, receives the order to leave for Africa with his flock. His girlfriend Elsa accompanies him to Livorno and the interruption of the railway line forces them to stop at the hotel, for what will be their only night of love. A few months later, Elsa's mother dies and she, who discovers she is expecting a baby, decides to move to Rome to escape the rumors of the country. In Rome, as a guest of a friend, she found a job as a dresser in a nightclub. Here she receives the attention of an engineer, Riccardo De Angelis, who hires her as an employee in her office. Meanwhile, the news arrives that Giorgio is reported missing and Riccardo, who has become acquainted with the child, decides to marry Elsa.

The life of the three passes peacefully for a few years, until Giorgio returns to Italy: not wanting to disturb the tranquility of Elsa and the child, Giorgio decides to step aside but, taken by desperation, ends up in a gang of criminals. One evening they attempt a robbery right in the engineer's villa. The companions kidnap the child and Giorgio, to save him, sacrifices his life.

== Cast ==
- Marco Vicario: Giorgio
- Rossana Podestà: Elsa
- Paolo Dola: Riccardo De Angelis
- Nyta Dover: Anna
- Emma Rossi: Elsa's mother
- Vittorio Duse: Il Levatino
- Ignazio Balsamo: Martinelli
- Andrea Aureli: Mario
- Silvio Noto: Fred
- Duccio Sissa: Giorgetto
- Bruno Corelli: Elsa's suitor
- Renato Chiantoni
