= Ennio Balbo =

Italian film actor (1922–1989)

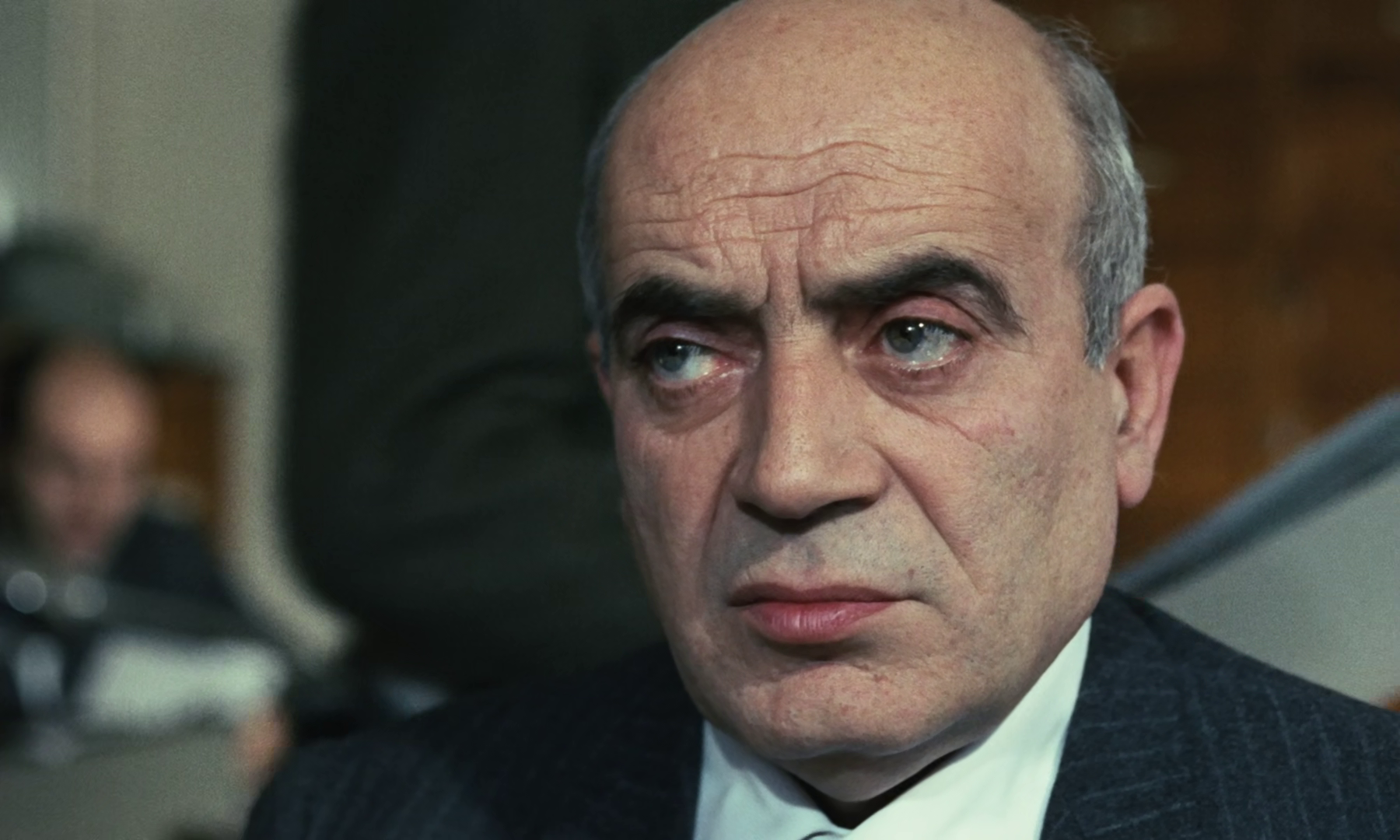
- Ennio Balbo as Mr. Marras in Sardinia Kidnapped (1968)
- Born: 18 April 1922; Naples, Italy
- Died: 18 June 1989 (aged 67); Rome, Italy
- Occupation: Actor
- Years active: 1945–1989

Ennio Balbo (18 April 1922 – 18 June 1989) was an Italian film, television and voice actor.

== Biography ==
Born in Naples, Balbo made his debut on stage immediately after the Second World War alongside Paola Borboni and Lamberto Picasso in Luigi Pirandello's Così è se vi pare. He was later a member of the theater company of Gino Cervi, as well as one of the members of the "Society of the Four" alongside Valeria Moriconi, Lia Zoppelli and Gianni Agus. He was also very active as a character actor in films, mainly in villain roles; Balbo took part to numerous Spaghetti Western films in which he was usually credited as Edward Bell. Balbo appeared in over 45 films between 1958 and 1988. He appeared in an episode of the short-lived 1974 ABC police drama Nakia, credited as Edward Bell.

== Selected filmography ==
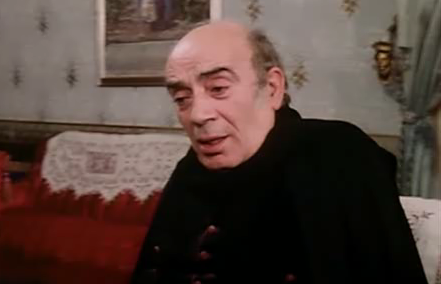
Balbo in Il fidanzamento (1975)

- Audace colpo dei soliti ignoti (1959) − Poliziotto calvo (voice, uncredited)
- The Police Commissioner (1962)
- A Queen for Caesar (1962) − Theodoto
- Catherine of Russia (1963) − count Panin
- Corruption (1963)
- Casanova 70 (1965) − Il giudice
- Terror−Creatures from the Grave (1965) − Oskar Stinner − The paralytic
- The Possessed (1965) − Coroner
- Agent 077 From the Orient with Fury (1965) − Professor Franz Kurtz
- Seven Golden Men (1965) − Police Chief
- Kiss the Other Sheik (1965) − Brother of Mohamed (segment "L'uomo dei 5 palloni") (uncredited)
- Seven Golden Men Strike Again (1966) − Police Chief
- Spies Strike Silently (1966)
- Pardon, Are You For or Against? (1966)
- Master Stroke (1967) − Doctor
- Da Berlino l'apocalisse (1967) − Papillon
- Day of Anger (1967) − Turner − Banker
- Two Faces of the Dollar (1967) − Gunsmith (uncredited)
- Qualcuno ha tradito (1967)
- The Day of the Owl (1968) − First Mafioso at the Banquet
- Gunman Sent by God (1968) − Thomas Clerigen
- Sardinia Kidnapped (1968) − Marras
- The Man with the Balloons (1968)
- The Black Sheep (1968) − Father−in−law of Agasti
- Gatling Gun (1968) − Richard Gatling
- The Appointment (1969) − Ugo Perino
- Giacomo Casanova: Childhood and Adolescence (1969) − Mocenigo
- Django the Bastard (1969) − Storekeeper (uncredited)
- Rendezvous with Dishonour (1970) − Chief of Police
- Ninì Tirabusciò: la donna che inventò la mossa (1970) − General
- The Adventures of Pinocchio (1972) − Alidoro (voice)
- The Great Kidnapping (1973) − Prefetto
- Anna: the Pleasure, the Torment (1973) − Frossi
- Anno uno (1974) − Nenni
- How to Kill a Judge (1975) − Il giudice istruttore
- Il fidanzamento (1975) − Monsignor Solinas
- The Left Hand of the Law (1975) − Lombardi
- Hallucination Strip (1975) − Antiquario
- Street People (1976) − Continenza
- Bestialità (1976)
- Star Odyssey (1979) − Professor Mauri
- Saremo felici (1989)
