= Tom Dollar =

- French film poster for Tom Dollar
- Directed by: Marcello Ciorciolini
- Screenplay by: John Connery; Pierre DeVries
- Story by: John Connery; Pierre DeVries
- Based on: Tom Dollar by Al Petre
- Produced by: Antonio Lucatelli; Francesco Giorgi
- Starring: Maurice Poli; Giorgia Moll
- Cinematography: Rino Filippini
- Edited by: Mario Anconetani
- Music by: Giosy Capuano; Mario Capuano
- Production companies: Tigiell 33; Les Films Jacques Leitienne
- Distributed by: Euro International
- Release date: 1967 (Italy)
- Running time: 90 minutes
- Countries: Italy; France

Tom Dollar is a 1967 spy film written and directed by Marcello Ciorciolini and starring Maurice Poli in the title role. It is based on a fotoromanzo, starring the same Poli, published in over 30 countries. It was shot in Tehran, Kingdom of Iran.

== Plot ==
Special agent Tom Dollar investigates the mysterious death of the Iranian prince Barancan.

== Cast ==
- Maurice Poli as Tom Dollar
- Giorgia Moll as Samia
- Erika Blanc as Lady Barbara Crane
- Franco Ressel as Mr. Gaber
- Jacques Herlin as Mr. Osborne
- Sojiro Kikukawa as Chief of Sings
- Jean Rougeul as Crisantemo
- Mirko Ellis

== Production ==
Tom Dollar was based on the photonovel of the same name by Al Petre. It was one of the first photonovels based on a secret agent and was released in the magazine Bolero Film in 1965. Maurice Poli played the role of Tom Dollar, and had already appeared in the photonovels as the character.

The film was predominantly shot in Rome, including scenes at the Villa Miani.

== Release ==
Tom Dollar was released in Italy in 1967 where it was distributed by Euro International.

== See also ==
- List of Italian films of 1967
- List of French films of 1967
