= The Naked Hours =

- Directed by: Marco Vicario
- Written by: Tonino Guerra; Marco Vicario
- Produced by: Marco Vicario
- Starring: Keir Dullea; Rossana Podestà
- Cinematography: Carlo Di Palma
- Music by: Riz Ortolani
- Release date: 1964
- Language: Italian

The Naked Hours (Italian: Le ore nude) is a 1964 Italian drama film directed by Marco Vicario and starring Keir Dullea and Rossana Podestà. It is based on the novel Appuntamento al mare by Alberto Moravia.

== Plot ==
In this sex-charged character study, a woman’s husband persuades her to share in his predilection for group sex. Later, she meets a student and has a one-day affair with him.

== Cast ==
- Keir Dullea as Aldo
- Rossana Podestà as Carla
- Philippe Leroy as Massimo
- Bruno Scipioni as Marcello
- Odoardo Spadaro as Nonno
- Tina Lepri as Claudia
