= Il fidanzamento =

- Directed by: Giovanni Grimaldi
- Written by: Goffredo Parise; Giovanni Grimaldi
- Produced by: Fulvio Lucisano
- Starring: Lando Buzzanca; Martine Brochard
- Cinematography: Mario Capriotti
- Music by: Piero Umiliani
- Release date: 28 February 1975
- Country: Italy
- Language: Italian

Il fidanzamento (The Engagement) is a 1975 Italian romantic comedy-drama film directed by Giovanni Grimaldi. It is based on the novel with the same name written by Goffredo Parise.

== Plot ==
Catania. Luigi Manozzi is a public official who has been engaged for 8 years to Mirella Guglielmi, whom he treats as the object of his sexual desires without however deciding to marry her. Mussia, the girl's mother, aware of her daughter's situation, constantly teases Luigi to push him to do his duty, even though the girl does not need to contract a shotgun marriage.

After being caught red-handed during coitus, Luigi slips away from Mirella's family for fear of being cornered by Mussia who, instead of blaming him for the fait accompli, proposes to help him financially; having no other arguments to procrastinate, Luigi works on a pretext to be transferred to L'Aquila while waiting for the situation to evolve in his favor.

Apprehensive about her daughter's bachelorette party, Mussia, with the help of her sister, Elide, tries to arrange a new engagement between Mirella and a peer, Lucio Davossa. Luigi is informed by his friend and colleague Totò of what is happening in his ex-girlfriend's family and with a devious maneuver, he breaks the bond just established between Mirella and Lucio.

With the death of Edmondo Guglielmi, Mirella's father, Luigi is taken into consideration by Mussia as a matter of comfort, always with the intention of pushing him to marry his daughter, counting on the fact that sooner or later, Mirella can get pregnant. At the end of the ordeal that saw, among a thousand subterfuges and vicissitudes, Luigi, Mirella and her family, the two finally contract the hoped-for marriage, even if, for a few moments, all those present at the ceremony remain in suspense because of the undaunted hesitation by Luigi.

== Cast ==
- Lando Buzzanca: Luigi Mannozzi
- Martine Brochard: Mirella Guglielmi
- Didi Perego: Elide
- Anna Proclemer: Mussia Katiuscia
- Michele Abruzzo: Edmondo Guglielmi
- Carlo Sposito: Totò
- Gabriele Antonini: Lucio Davossa
- Antonia Brancati: Maria Pia
- Ennio Balbo: Monsignor Solinas
- Riccardo Garrone: Vincenzo
- Daniela Giordano: Lina

== See also ==
- List of Italian films of 1975
