= Rossana (film) =

1953 film

- Directed by: Emilio Fernández
- Written by: Neftali Beltrán; Emilio Fernández
- Produced by: Salvador Elizondo
- Starring: Rossana Podestà
- Cinematography: Alex Phillips
- Edited by: Jorge Bustos
- Release dates: April 1953 (Cannes); May 1953 (Mexico)
- Running time: 83 minutes
- Country: Mexico
- Language: Spanish

Rossana (Spanish: La red) is a 1953 Mexican drama film directed by Emilio Fernández. It was entered into the 1953 Cannes Film Festival.

== Cast ==
- Rossana Podestà as Rossana
- Crox Alvarado as Antonio
- Armando Silvestre as José Luis
- Guillermo Cramer as Rivera
- Carlos Riquelme as Sponge Trader
- Margarito Luna as Fisherman
- Armando Velasco
- Lilia Fresno
- Antonio Bribiesca as Guitar player
- Emilio Garibay as Policeman
- Manuel Vergara 'Manver' as Bartender
