= Steffen Zacharias =

German actor (born 1927)

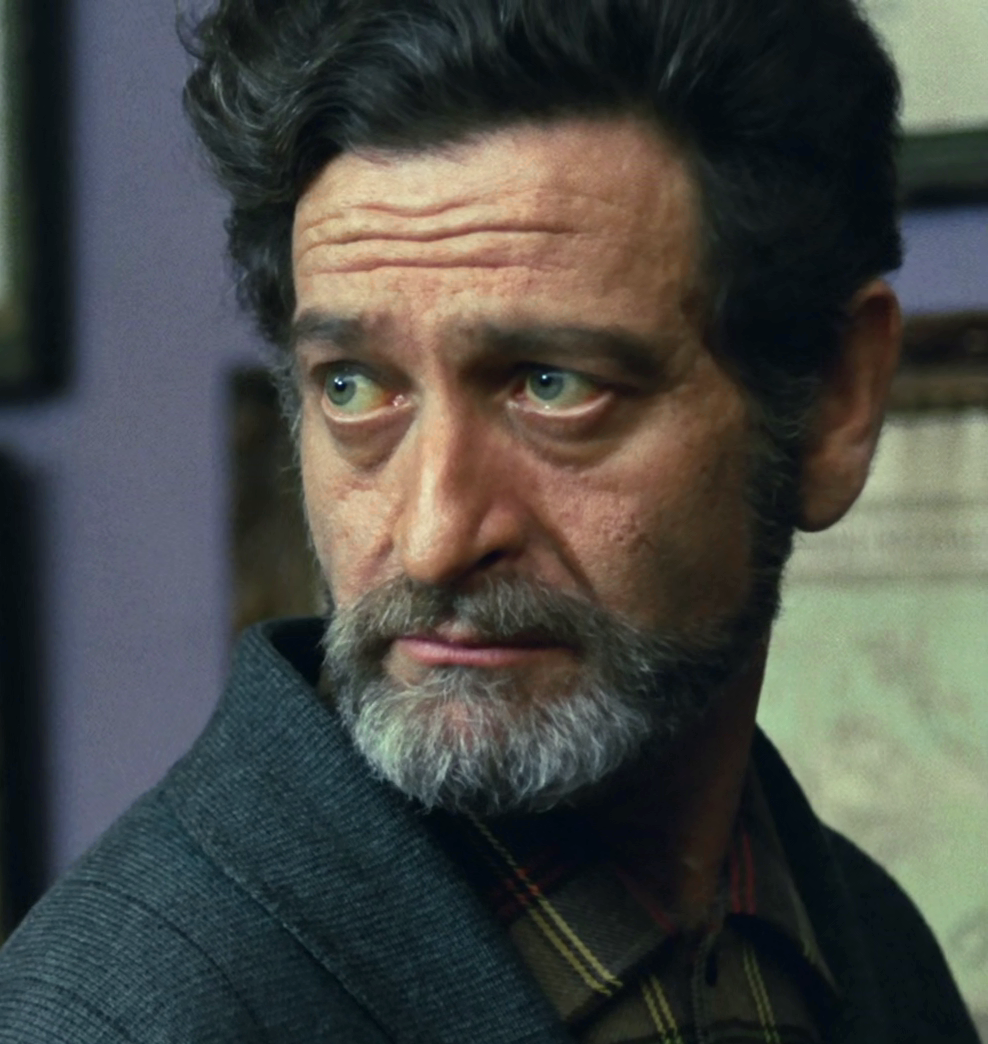
- Zacharias in Sardinia Kidnapped (1968)
- Born: April 11, 1927; Hamburg, Germany
- Died: June 6, 1989 (aged 62); North Hollywood, U.S.
- Occupation: Actor
- Years active: 1964–1987

Steffen Zacharias (April 11, 1927 – June 6, 1989) was a German-born Greek American character actor known for his roles in films and television in America and Italy.

== Biography ==
Born in Germany to Greek parents, Zacharias grew up in the United States, where he worked in New York City as a stage director, before making his acting debut in The Reporter.

He migrated to Italy in 1967, and quickly gained a reputation as a reliable performer of character roles in genre films, including several appearances alongside Terence Hill and Bud Spencer.

In the late 1970s, he went back to the U.S., where he continued to play occasional supporting roles until his death from cancer in 1989.

== Partial filmography ==
- Gammera the Invincible (1966) - Sen. Billings
- Catch as Catch Can (1967) - Police Inspector
- Italian Secret Service (1968) - Dr. Wollenkampf (uncredited)
- Sardinia Kidnapped (1968) - Santulus Surgiu
- Ace High (1968) - Harold
- Colpo di stato (1969) - George Bradis
- Machine Gun McCain (1969) - Abe Stilberman
- The Five Man Army (1969) - Poker Player (uncredited)
- Under the Sign of Scorpio (1969) - The old islander
- Beatrice Cenci (1969) - Prospero Fadinacco
- The Kremlin Letter (1970) - Dittomachine
- Metello (1970) - Pallesi
- A Man Called Sledge (1970) - Red - Prison Guard
- The Golden Ass (1970) - Milone
- A Pocketful of Chestnuts (1970)
- They Call Me Trinity (1970) - Jonathan
- Terrible Day of the Big Gundown (1971) - Gregory
- The Blonde in the Blue Movie (1971) - Bosen, the producer
- Vengeance Is a Dish Served Cold (1971) - Doc
- Return of Sabata (1971) - Donovan
- Man of the East (1972) - Man with Coach
- Man of La Mancha (1972) - Muleteer
- The Sicilian Connection (1972) - Sally
- Even Angels Eat Beans (1973) - Gerace
- The Infamous Column (1973) - Stefano Baruello
- The Violent Professionals (1973) - Monsomerda
- Revolver (1973) - Joe Le Corse
- Seven Hours of Violence (1973) - Fastikopoulos
- Mean Frank and Crazy Tony (1973) - Lawyer (uncredited)
- What Have They Done to Your Daughters? (1974) - Prof. Beltrame (uncredited)
- Street Law (1974) - Attorney Friend of Carlo's (uncredited)
- Mondo candido (1975) - Il saggio
- W.C. Fields and Me (1976) - Dr. Zahn (uncredited)
- The Winds of Kitty Hawk (1978, TV Movie) - Fisherman
- The Frisco Kid (1979) - Herschel Rosensheine
- The Girl, the Gold Watch & Everything (1980, TV Movie) - Old Man
- Death Wish II (1982) - Dr. Clark
- The Ice Pirates (1984) - Prisoner
- Exterminator 2 (1984) - Pop
- Irreconcilable Differences (1984) - Man at Party
