= The Sensual Man =

- Directed by: Marco Vicario
- Written by: Marco Vicario
- Story by: Vitaliano Brancati
- Starring: Giancarlo Giannini; Rossana Podestà; Lionel Stander
- Cinematography: Tonino Delli Colli
- Edited by: Nino Baragli
- Music by: Armando Trovajoli
- Release date: 1974
- Country: Italy
- Language: Italian
- Box office: $4.5 million (Italy)

The Sensual Man (Italian: Paolo il caldo, also known as The Sensuous Sicilian) is a 1974 Italian comedy film written and directed by Marco Vicario.

It is loosely based on the novel of the same name written by Vitaliano Brancati. It was shot in Catania, Sicily and in Rome.

== Plot ==
A Sicilian baron, Paolo Castorini, has spent his life (beginning before puberty) dealing with girls, and later, women, usually in matters of the flesh. But later in life he begins to search for a deeper meaning to life. When his father is brought to his deathbed, Paolo (after making a pass at the dying man's nurse) is surprised to learn that the apparently staid, upright father had been unfaithful as a young man, as also Paolo's grandfather, and that such unfaithfulness had brought consequences both moral and medical.

== Cast ==
- Giancarlo Giannini: Paolo Castorini
- Rossana Podestà: Lilia
- Riccardo Cucciolla: Paolo's father
- Lionel Stander: Paolo's Grandfather, Baron Castorini
- Gastone Moschin: Uncle Edmondo
- Adriana Asti: Beatrice
- Marianne Comtell: Paolo's mother
- Vittorio Caprioli: Salvatore, the pharmacist
- Ornella Muti: Giovanna
- Barbara Bach: Anna
- Neda Arnerić: Caterina, Paolo's wife
- Dori Dorika: Paolo's sister
- Pilar Velázquez: Ester
- Femi Benussi: Prostitute in red
- Umberto D'Orsi: The Marquis
- Orchidea de Santis: Prostitute with fur coat
- Oreste Lionello: Painter
- Mario Pisu: Lorenzo Banchieri
- Attilio Dottesio: Doctor Mondella
- Eugene Walter: Jacomini

== Release and reception ==
The movie, of 1:48 hr running time, was released and circulated in Italy, and also played in US arthouses under the title Paolo il Caldo. Then in 1977 it was re-released for the English-speaking public under the title The Sensual Man, with English subtitles. It received a US MPAA film rating of "R".

Film Critic John Simon described The Sensual Man as an "atrocious movie".
