= Barbara Nichols =

American actress (1928–1976)

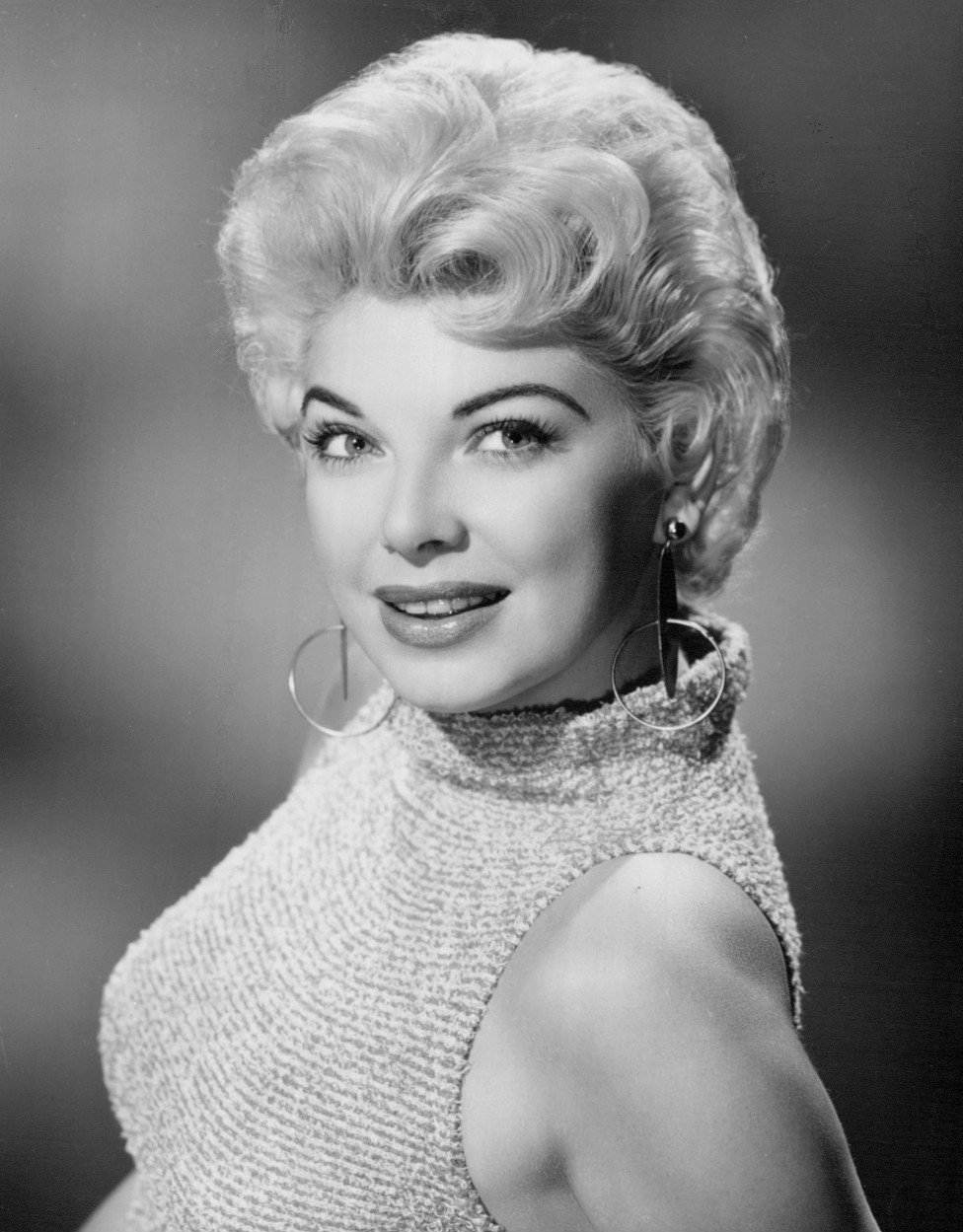
- Nichols in 1956
- Born: Barbara Marie Nickerauer; December 10, 1928; Mineola, New York, U.S.
- Died: October 5, 1976 (aged 47); Los Angeles, California, U.S.
- Resting place: Pinelawn Memorial Park
- Occupation: Actress
- Years active: 1953–1976

Barbara Marie Nickerauer (December 10, 1928 – October 5, 1976), known professionally as Barbara Nichols, was an American actress who often played brassy or comic roles in films in the 1950s and 1960s.

== Early years ==
Born Barbara Marie Nickerauer in Mineola, New York, and raised in South Ozone Park, Queens, Nichols was the only child of German parents, George and Julia Nickerauer.

Nichols became involved with acting in elementary school, and she began winning beauty contests. By the time she was a student at Woodrow Wilson High School she was chosen as that school's most beautiful girl. Her other titles included Miss Long Island Duckling and Miss Dill Pickle.

== Career ==
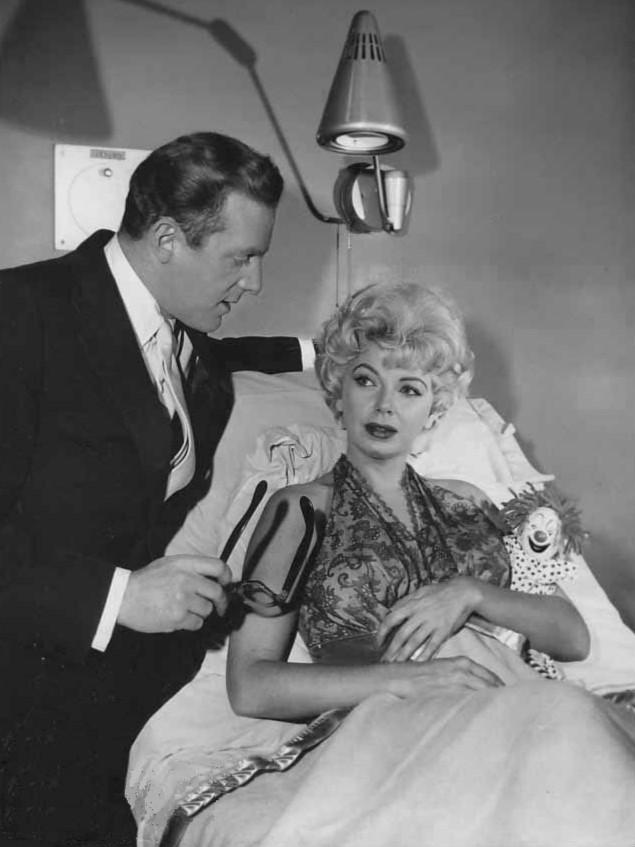
With Fredd Wayne in a 1961 episode of The Twilight Zone

After high school Nichols was a member of the chorus line in a hotel's floor show in Ciudad Trujillo, Dominican Republic. She went from there to work in the Latin Quarter in New York, and she was the calendar girl for Esquire magazine for two years.

She was a showgirl when a club owner offered her a much higher salary to perform striptease. She declined the offer, keeping her focus on becoming an actress. She began modeling for cheesecake magazines in the late 1940s and eventually was considered a minor rival to Marilyn Monroe. On Broadway, she appeared in the 1952 revival of Pal Joey (she also appeared in the 1957 film version) and in Let It Ride (1961). In the mid-1950s, she moved to Hollywood and began appearing in showy supporting roles in A-films, such as Miracle in the Rain (1956), The King and Four Queens (1956), The Naked and the Dead (1958), The Pajama Game (1957), Sweet Smell of Success (1957), That Kind of Woman (1958), and Where the Boys Are (1960), with high-profile actors, including Clark Gable, Susan Hayward, Sophia Loren, and Doris Day. One of her few starring roles was in the 1965 science-fiction film The Human Duplicators. Her final film was Won Ton Ton, the Dog Who Saved Hollywood in 1976.

Nichols was a frequent guest star on many television series, including Caesar's Hour, It's a Great Life, The Jack Benny Television Show, The Twilight Zone (in the episode "Twenty Two" S2 E17 1961), The Untouchables, The Travels of Jaimie McPheeters, Going My Way, Dragnet, Adam-12, Batman (episodes 35 and 36), Emergency! (season 4, episode 12), Hawaii Five-O, Green Acres and The Beverly Hillbillies.

== Death ==
On October 5, 1976, after having, apart from one brief pre-Labor Day reprieve, spent approximately two months comatose, Nichols died at Cedars-Sinai Medical Center in Los Angeles from liver failure due to complications of a damaged spleen and liver reportedly sustained in separate automobile accidents many years earlier. She is interred at Pinelawn Memorial Park in Farmingdale, New York.

== Filmography ==
Film
Year	Title	Role	Notes
1954	River of No Return	Blonde dancer	Uncredited
1956	Manfish	Mimi	
1956	Miracle in the Rain	Arlene Parker née Witchy	
1956	Beyond a Reasonable Doubt	Dolly Moore	
1956	The Wild Party	Sandy	
1956	The King and Four Queens	Birdie McDade	
1957	Sweet Smell of Success	Rita	
1957	The Pajama Game	Poopsie	
1957	Pal Joey	Gladys	
1958	Ten North Frederick	Stella	
1958	The Naked and the Dead	Mildred Croft	
1959	Woman Obsessed	Mayme Radzevitch	
1959	That Kind of Woman	Jane	
1960	Who Was That Lady?	Gloria Coogle	
1960	Where the Boys Are	Lola Fandango	
1961	The George Raft Story	Texas Guinan	
1962	House of Women	Candy Kane	
1964	Looking for Love	Gaye Swinger	
1964	Dear Heart	June Loveland	
1964	The Disorderly Orderly	Miss Marlowe	
1965	The Human Duplicators	Gale Wilson	(Alternative title: Jaws of the Alien)
1965	The Loved One	Sadie Blodgett	
1966	The Swinger	Blossom LaTour	
1968	The Power	Flora	
1968	Criminal Affair		(Alternative titles: Seven Men and One Brain and Sette uomini e un cervello)
1973	Charley and the Angel	Sadie	
1974	The Photographer	Mrs. Wilde	
1976	Won Ton Ton, the Dog Who Saved Hollywood	Nick's Girl	

Television
Year	Title	Role	Episodes
1953	Studio One in Hollywood	First Pretty Girl	Season 6 Episode 11: "Complications of a Nervous Man"
1954	The Mask		Season 1 Episode 1: "Murder in the Burlesque House"
1954	The United States Steel Hour	Bridie	Season 1 Episode 17: "Good for You"
1954	The Philco-Goodyear Television Playhouse	Ruth	Season 6 Episode 24: "The Man in the Middle of the Ocean"
1954	Center Stage		Season 1 Episode 9: "Heart of a Clown"
1954	Armstrong Circle Theatre	Bar Patron / Party Flirt / Bobsey Baxter	Season 5 Episode 10: "Fred Allen's Sketchbook"
1955	Danger	Scheherazade	Season 5 Episode 32: "Sandy River Blues"
1956	Chevron Hall of Stars	Rosie	Episode: "Double Cross"
1956	It's a Great Life	Caroline Cabot	Season 2 Episode 29: "Glamour Doll"; Season 2 Episode 32: "The Return of Caroline"
1956	The Bob Cummings Show	Sheila	Season 2 Episode 29: "The Con Man"
1957	Matinee Theater		Season 3 Episode 62: "The Gentleman Caller"
1957	The Thin Man	Jeri Ames	Season 1 Episode 14: "Unwelcome Alibi"
1958	The Bob Cummings Show	Marian Billington	Season 5 Episode 1: "Bob and Schultzy Reunite"; Season 5 Episode 2: "Bob and the Dumb Blonde"
1958	Maverick	Blanche	Season 1 Episode 15: "The Third Rider"
1958	Love That Jill	Ginger	13 episodes
1958	Shower of Stars	Miss Kim O'Day	Season 4 Episode 7
1958	Climax!	Dale Benson	Season 4 Episode 30: "The Push-Button Giant"
1958	Dragnet		Season 8 Episode 3: "The Big Star"
1958	The Milton Berle Show	Guest	Episode dated November 19, 1958
1958	The Red Skelton Hour	Gertie, Bolivar's Girlfriend	Season 7 Episode 26: "Bolivar Gets Amnesia"; Season 8 Episode 3: "Bolivar - the Quiz Champ"
1958	The Jack Benny Program	Mildred Meyerhouser	Season 9 Episode 8: "Christmas Gift Exchange"
1959	The Jack Benny Program	Mildred Meyerhouser	Season 10 Episode 4: "The Jimmy Stewart Show" (uncredited)
1959	The Thin Man	Rita Fay	Season 2 Episode 12: "The Case of the Baggy Pants"
1959	The Red Skelton Hour	Myrtle, Bolivar's Girlfriend	Season 9 Episode 10: "Bolivar the Songwriter"
1959	The Scarface Mob	Brandy LaFrance	Television movie
1959	Westinghouse Desilu Playhouse	Brandy LaFrance	Season 1 Episode 20: "The Untouchable: Part 1"; Season 1 Episode 21: "The Untouchable: Part 2"
1959	The Real McCoys	Gladys Slade	Season 3 Episode 11: "The Politician"
1959	The Untouchables	Brandy LaFrance	Pilot Episode; Season 1 Episode 1: "The Empty Chair"
1959	The Dennis O'Keefe Show		Season 1 Episode 10: "There Goes the Groom"
1960	The Red Skelton Hour	Gertie, Bolivar's Girlfriend	Season 9 Episode 19: "Bolivar and the Roaring Twenties"
1960	The Jack Benny Program	Mildred Meyerhouser	Season 10 Episode 14: "Easter Show"; Season 11 Episode 8: "Jack Goes to Concert"
1960	Stagecoach West	Sadie Wren	Season 1 Episode 6: "A Time to Run"
1961	The Twilight Zone	Liz Powell	Season 2 Episode 17: "Twenty Two"
1961	G.E. True Theater	Leslie Blaine	Season 9 Episode 24: "The Small Elephants"
1961	Michael Shayne	Topaz McQueen	Season 1 Episode 26: "Marriage Can Be Fatal"
1961	The Detectives Starring Robert Taylor	Abby Landis	Season 2 Episode 34: "Duty Date"
1961	Miami Undercover	Kitty	Season 1 Episode 18: "Kitty"
1961	Westinghouse Playhouse	Lorraine Hadley	Season 1 Episode 23: "House Guest"
1962	The Dick Powell Show	Bunny Easter	Season 1 Episode 29: "No Strings Attached"
1963	Alcoa Premiere	Willy Simms	Season 2 Episode 17: "Five, Six, Pick Up Sticks"
1963	Going My Way	Marie	Season 1 Episode 21: "Has Anyone Seen Eddie?"
1963	Vacation Playhouse	Barbara Adams	Season 1 Episode 7: "All About Barbara"
1963	Arrest and Trial	Ginny	Season 1 Episode 2: "Isn't It a Lovely View"
1963	Grindl	Wilma Bryan	Season 1 Episode 8: "Grindl, Witness for the Defense"
1963	The Beverly Hillbillies	Chickadee Laverne	Season 2 Episode 6: "Jethro's First Love"; Season 2 Episode 7: "Chickadee Returns"
1964	Kraft Suspense Theatre	Ann Hilts	Season 1 Episode 15: "My Enemy, This Town"
1964	The Travels of Jaimie McPheeters	Mamie	Season 1 Episode 25: "The Day of the Dark Deeds"
1965	Laredo	Princess	Season 1 Episode 7: "A Question of Discipline"
1966	The Wild Wild West	Bessie	Season 1 Episode 20: "The Night of the Whirring Death"
1966	Batman	Maid Marilyn	Season 2 Episode 1: "Shoot a Crooked Arrow"; Season 2 Episode 2: "Walk the Straight and Narrow"
1967	Green Acres	Wanda	Season 2 Episode 20: "Never Take Your Wife to a Convention"
1967	The Girl from U.N.C.L.E.	Ida Martz	Season 1 Episode 25: "The Phi Beta Killer Affair"
1967	The Jackie Gleason Show	Kitty, Big Sam's Moll	Season 2 Episode 11: "The Honeymooners: Two Faces of Ralph Kramden"
1969	Hawaii Five-O	Betsy	Season 2 Episode 1: "A Thousand Pardons - You're Dead!"
1971	The Smith Family	Effie	Season 1 Episode 14: "Greener Pastures"
1971	The Doris Day Show	Mrs. Hollister	Season 4 Episode 9: "Have I Got a Fellow for You!"
1971	Love, American Style	Gladys	Season 3 Episode 14 (Segment: "Love and the Doctor's Honeymoon")
1971	Adam-12	Ginger Stephens	Season 4 Episode 7: "Truant"
1972	Adam-12	Janice Walker	Season 5 Episode 9: "Vendetta"
1973	Adam-12	Elizabeth Mitchell	Season 6 Episode 4: "West Valley Division"
1974	Emergency!	Ginger	Season 4 Episode 12: "Details"
1974	The Rookies	Marie Antionette	Season 3 Episode 13: "Blue Christmas"
