= Seven Golden Men =

1965 film by Marco Vicario

Sette uomini d'oro
- Directed by: Marco Vicario
- Written by: Marco Vicario
- Produced by: Ugo Tucci; Marco Vicario
- Starring: Rossana Podestà; Philippe Leroy; Gastone Moschin; Gabriele Tinti; Maurice Poli; Manuel Zarzo; Giampiero Albertini; Dario De Grassi; José Suárez
- Cinematography: Ennio Guarnieri
- Edited by: Roberto Cinquini
- Music by: Armando Trovajoli
- Production company: Atlantica Cinematografica Produzione; Paris Union Films; As Films Producción
- Distributed by: L'Atlantica Cinematografica (Italy)
- Release dates: September 1965 (Venice); 21 October 1965 (Italy); 18 March 1966 (France)
- Country: Italy; France; Spain
- Language: Italian

Seven Golden Men (Italian: Sette uomini d'oro) is a 1965 heist comedy film written, produced, and directed by Marco Vicario, starring an ensemble cast led by Rossana Podestà and Philippe Leroy. It follows a gang of seven men and one woman who plot a robbery of gold bullion at the Swiss National Bank. The film was heavily inspired by the 1964 American film Topkapi.

The film was a critical and commercial success, and was followed by a sequel, Seven Golden Men Strike Again, the following year. It won Nastro d'Argento Awards for Best Producer (Vicario) and Best Score (Armando Trovajoli).

== Plot ==
The film revolves around an internationally team of high-profile heisters specializing in gold thefts, led by criminal mastermind Albert "the Professor" and his seductive lover Giorgia. Their target is the Swiss National Bank in Geneva, which is hoarding a large amount of gold bullions in their high-security vault; while Albert directs the operation from his hotel room, Giorgia acts as a decoy and provides information from inside the bank with hidden cameras, a homing device placed inside the vault, and explanations gleamed from the bank's manager. The other six men - Adolf, August, Aldo, Anthony, Alfonso and Alfred - posing as sanitation workers and equipped with a truckload of gadgets, enter the sewer system right beneath the bank. Avoiding the intricate security system, they drill into the vault, right into the underside of the bullion stack, and steal six tons of gold while leaving the outermost layer intact to conceal their heist.

While the plan is perfectly executed, it hits several snags. A radio ham intercepts their transmissions and informs the police, but Interpol, who is on the team's trail, dismisses the case after a superficial check in the vault. Giorgia wandering around the hotel suite with insufficient clothing nearly brings the police down on Albert for disorderly conduct, but Giorgia charms the policeman away. In the end, the whole team gets away unscathed. After declaring the whole load a delivery of brass for a foundry in Naples, they split into two groups, with Albert and Giorgia travelling by train while the others go across the border by car. However, Albert is in no mind to share the spoils, and his six companions are detained for possessing forged passports. But in turn, Albert is betrayed by Giorgia, who has begun an affair with the bank manager and devised a plan to steal all the gold for their own.

However, when Giorgia and her new lover attempt to intercept the cargo, they learn to their horror that it has been transported far quicker than anticipated, and has already been melted down; disappointed, the bank manager leaves Giorgia behind. But Albert has actually tricked them and diverted the gold cargo to Rome. There he reunites with Giorgia; but their ex-associates, who have been released in the meantime, trail them to the place where Albert has hidden the truck with the gold. The chase ends in front of the Colosseum, where the six intercept the transport; but August accidentally disengages the handbrakes, causing the truck to roll into the open and crash, spilling the bullions to the feet of a crowd of greedy pedestrians. With their plan ultimately foiled, the Golden Men grudgingly reunite and prepare a new heist on the Commercial Bank of Italy.

== Cast ==
- Rossana Podestà as Giorgia
- Philippe Leroy as Albert, "the Professor"
- Gastone Moschin as Adolf, the German
- Giampiero Albertini as August, the Portuguese
- Gabriele Tinti as Aldo, the Italian
- Dario De Grassi as Anthony, the Irishman
- Manuel Zarzo as Alfonso, the Spaniard
- Maurice Poli as Alfred, the Frenchman
- José Suárez as the Bank Manager
- Ennio Balbo the Police Chief
- Alberto Bonucci the Radio Ham
- Juan Luis Galiardo as Bank Clerk
- Renzo Palmer as Customs Officer
- Carlo Reali as Inspector Köller

== Release ==
The film premiered out-of-competition at the 26th Venice International Film Festival, and was released in Italy on 21 October 1965. An English dub was released by Warner Bros.-Seven Arts in April 1969.

== Reception ==
Critics Carlo Mirra and Giorgio Giuliani suggested the film was an influence on the Japanese manga and anime franchise Lupin the Third.

The success of the film spawned a direct sequel the following year, Seven Golden Men Strike Again, reuniting the same cast and crew. Comedy duo Franco and Ciccio starred in a parody film, How to Rob the Bank of Italy, also released in 1966. The 1969 film Seven Times Seven, produced by Vicario but directed by Michele Lupo, is a spiritual sequel to the Golden Men films.

Alfonso Brescia's 1979 low-budget sci-fi film Star Odyssey went by the title Sette uomini d'oro nello spazio ("Seven Golden Men in Space") in its original Italian.

=== Awards and nominations ===
Award	Year	Category	Nominee	Result
Nastro d'Argento	1966	Best Producer	Marco Vicario	Won
Nastro d'Argento	1966	Best Original Story	Marco Vicario	Nominated
Nastro d'Argento	1966	Best Score	Armando Trovajoli	Won
