= Marco Vicario =

Italian actor (1925–2020)

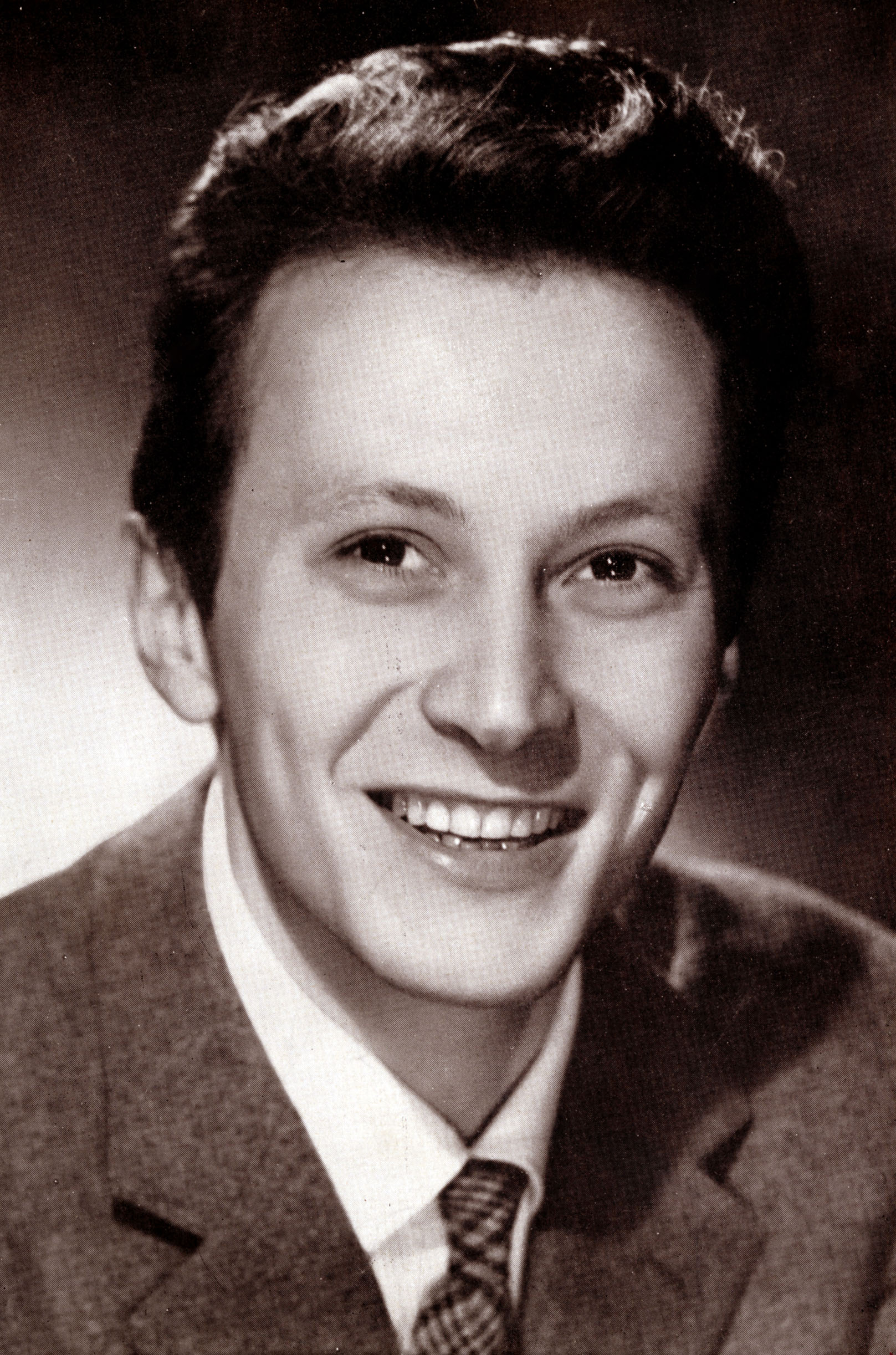
- Born: 20 September 1925; Rome, Kingdom of Italy
- Died: 10 September 2020 (aged 94); Rome, Italy
- Occupations: Actor, screenwriter, film producer, film director
- Years active: 1950-1982
- Spouse(s): Rossana Podestà (1953-1976) (divorced) (2 children); Patrizia Castaldi (1986) (1 child)
- Children: 3

Marco Vicario (20 September 1925 – 10 September 2020) was an Italian film actor, screenwriter, film producer and director. He appeared in 23 films between 1950 and 1958. He also wrote for 13 films, produced 12 and directed a further 11. He was born in Rome, Italy in September 1925. Vicario died in September 2020 at the age of 94.

== Selected filmography ==
- Cavalcade of Heroes (1950) - Mario
- Alina (1950) - The young Man at the Roulette (uncredited)
- La taverna della libertà (1950)
- Appointment for Murder (1951) - Giorgio Morelli
- Operation Mitra (1951)
- Rome 11:00 (1952)
- The Eternal Chain (1952) - Sandro Ronchi
- La storia del fornaretto di Venezia (1952)
- Ragazze da marito (1952) - (uncredited)
- Half a Century of Song (1952)
- Redemption (1952) - Barone Paolo Di San Lario
- La storia del fornaretto di Venezia (1952)
- Addio, figlio mio! (1953) - Giorgio
- Madonna delle rose (1953) - Renato Venturi
- Soli per le strade (1953)
- Rivalità (1953) - Dottor Roberto Ferrero
- Folgore Division (1954) - Paratrooper
- Vacanze a Villa Igea (1954)
- Nosotros dos (1955) - Beto Avilés
- Non scherzare con le donne (1955)
- Songs of Italy (1955)
- Playa prohibida (1956)
- Alone in the Streets (1956) - Fiancé
- Saranno uomini (1957) - Aldo
- El Alamein (1957) - (uncredited)
- Giovane canaglia (1958) - Sandro Petrei (final film role)
- Danza macabra (1964, produced)
- The Naked Hours (1964, wrote, directed and produced)
- Seven Golden Men (1965, directed)
- Seven Times Seven (1969, produced)
- Machine Gun McCain (1969, produced)
- The Swinging Confessors (1970, wrote and directed)
- Man of the Year (1971, wrote and directed)
- The Sensual Man (1974, wrote and directed)
- Wifemistress (1977, wrote and directed)
