= Ludwig Donath =

Austrian actor (1900–1967)

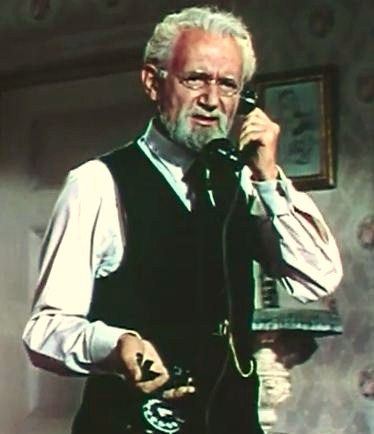
- Donath in Jolson Sings Again (1949)
- Born: 6 March 1900; Vienna, Austria-Hungary (now Austria)
- Died: 29 September 1967 (aged 67); New York City, New York, U.S.
- Other name: Louis Donath
- Occupation: Actor
- Years active: 1921–1967

Ludwig Donath (6 March 1900 – 29 September 1967) was an Austrian actor. He appeared in many American films and television series after emigrating there in 1940, as a refugee from Nazi Germany.

== Early life and work ==
Born to a Jewish family in Vienna, Donath studied at the University of Music and Performing Arts Vienna. He began his professional stage career at the Volkstheater in 1919. A year later, he moved to Germany for an engagement at the Munich Kammerspiele, and subsequently became a prominent stage actor in Berlin. He made his film debut in the silent biopic Theodor Herzl (1921), playing Prince Eugene of Savoy.

When the Nazis came to power in 1933, Donath initially moved to Czechoslovakia, joining a theatre company in Ostrava, before returning to his native Vienna. He was a member of the repertory company of the Theater an der Wien until the Anschluss in 1938. He initially fled to Switzerland, appearing in the film Fusilier Wipf, before moving to the United States in 1940.

== Career in the United States ==
Donath began his American film career with Lady from Chungking (1942) and went on to appear in dozens of films, including Gilda (1946), The Great Caruso (1951), My Pal Gus (1952), and Sirocco (1951). He initially adopted the Anglicized stage name 'Louis Donath', though he would revert to using his real name in 1944. During World War II, he often portrayed Nazi villains, including Adolf Hitler himself on three occasions.

Donath played the father of entertainer Al Jolson (Larry Parks) in the two biopics The Jolson Story (1946) and Jolson Sings Again (1949), although he was less than 15 years older than Parks as Jolson.

In the early 1950s during the Second Red Scare, Donath was blacklisted due to his leftist political sympathies. He moved from Hollywood to New York City, and mostly worked in television and on Broadway. He starred in Abie's Irish Rose and the musical She Loves Me. In 1966, he had a minor comeback with a prominent supporting role in Alfred Hitchcock's Cold War thriller Torn Curtain, playing an eccentric East German rocket scientist.

== Personal life ==
Donath married Jean Montrose in 1955.

=== Death ===
Donath died of leukemia on 20 September 1967, at the age of 67. His cremains are interred at Ferncliff Cemetery in Hartsdale, New York. At the time of his death, Donath had completed filming of the made-for-TV film To Die in Paris, which aired posthumously a year later.

== Filmography ==
=== Film ===
Year	Title	Role	Notes
1921	Theodor Herzl	Prince Eugene	
1932	Girls to Marry		
1938	Füsilier Wipf	Prisoner-of-War	Uncredited
1942	Lady from Chungking	Hans Gruber	Credited as 'Louis Donath'
1942	Enemy Agents Meet Ellery Queen	Reece	Credited as 'Louis Donath'
1942	The Secret Code	Prof. Metzger	Credited as 'Louis Donath'
1942	The Falcon's Brother	Stranger in Telephone Booth	Uncredited
1942	Reunion in France	Hotel Desk Clerk	Uncredited
1943	Margin for Error	Adolf Hitler (voice)	Credited as 'Louis Donath'
1943	The Moon Is Down	Adolf Hitler (voice)	Credited as 'Louis Donath'
1943	Hangmen Also Die!	Schirmer	Credited as 'Louis Donath'
1943	Tonight We Raid Calais	German Sentry	Credited as 'Louis Donath'
1943	This Land Is Mine	German Captain	Uncredited
1943	Above Suspicion	Gestapo Officer	Uncredited
1943	Hostages	Karel Klima	Uncredited
1943	Gangway for Tomorrow	Polish Worker	Uncredited
1943	The Strange Death of Adolf Hitler	Adolf Hitler / Franz Huber	
1944	Tampico	U-Boat Commander	Uncredited
1944	The Hitler Gang	Gustav von Kahr	
1944	The Story of Dr. Wassell	Dutch Doctor on Train	Uncredited
1944	The Seventh Cross	Wilhelm Reinhardt	Uncredited
1944	The Master Race	Schmidt	Credited as 'Louis Donath'
1945	Counter-Attack	Prof. Müller	
1945	Prison Ship	Professor	
1946	Gilda	German Cartel Member	
1946	The Devil's Mask	Dr. Karger	
1946	Renegades	Jackorski	
1946	The Jolson Story	Moses Yoelson	
1946	Blondie Knows Best	Dr. Titus	
1946	The Return of Monte Cristo	Judge Lafitte	
1947	Cigarette Girl	Otto	
1948	To the Ends of the Earth	Nicholas Sokim	
1948	Sealed Verdict	Jakob Meyersohn	
1949	The Fighting O'Flynn	Hendrigg	
1949	The Lovable Cheat	Violette	
1949	The Great Sinner	Doctor	
1949	Jolson Sings Again	Moses Yoelson	
1949	There's a Girl in My Heart	Prof. Joseph Kroner	
1950	The Killer That Stalked New York	Dr. Cooper	
1950	Mystery Submarine	Dr. Adolph Guernitz	
1950	The Great Caruso	Alfredo Brazzi	
1951	Sirocco	Flophouse Proprietor	
1951	The Guest		Short film
1951	Journey Into Light	'Doc' Thorssen	
1952	My Pal Gus	Karl	
1953	Sins of Jezebel	Naboth	
1953	The Veils of Bagdad	Kaffar	
1966	Torn Curtain	Prof. Gustav Lindt	
1966	Too Many Thieves	Bulanerti	Re-edited episodes of The Trials of O'Brien
1967	The Spy in the Green Hat	Dr. Heinrich von Kronen	Re-edited episodes of The Man from U.N.C.L.E.

=== Television ===
Year	Title	Role	Notes
1949	Your Show Time	Bishop Bienvenue	1 episode
1950–51	The Billy Rose Show		4 episodes
1951	Studio One		1 episode
1951	Celanese Theatre	Esdras	1 episode
1952	Personal Appearance Theater		2 episodes
1952	Space Patrol	Prof. Bradshaw	1 episode
1952	Gruen Playhouse		3 episodes
1952	The Unexpected	Mr. O	1 episode
1952	The Doctor		1 episode
1953	Joseph Schildkraut Presents		1 episode
1953	The Pepsi-Cola Playhouse	Nick	1 episode
1955–56	Frontiers of Faith		5 episodes
1955–57	Matinee Theater	Sigmund Freud	2 episodes
1957	The Alcoa Hour	Max	1 episode
1958	Kraft Mystery Theatre		1 episode
1958	Decoy	Fred, "Knish" Levin	2 episodes
1959	Playhouse 90	Dr. Wickert	1 episode
1959–62	Naked City	Various roles	3 episodes
1960	Omnibus	Vladimir Lenin	1 episode
1960–61	The Play of the Week	Various roles	3 episodes (including "The Dybbuk")
1961	Give Us Barabbas!	Joseph	TV movie
1961	Camera Three	Peter Altenberg	1 episode
1961	Cain's Hundred	Hans Salzmann	1 episode
1961–63	The Dick Powell Show	Victor, Jan Veltman	2 episodes
1962	Ben Casey	Rabbi Meyer Levinson	1 episode
1962–63	The Defenders	Dr. Mayer Loeb, I.W. Vorchek	2 episodes
1963	The Twilight Zone	Ernst Ganz	1 episode ("He's Alive")
1963	Bonanza	Aaron Kaufman	1 episode
1965	Branded	Julius Perrin	1 episode
1966	The Trials of O'Brien	Bulanerti	2 episodes
1966	Wojeck	Frederick Mueller	1 episode
1966	The Man from U.N.C.L.E.	Dr. Heinrich von Kronen	1 episode
1966	The Fugitive	Dr. Josef Karac	1 episode
1968	To Die in Paris	Gen. Ludmer	TV movie Posthumous release

== Partial stage credits ==
Year	Title	Role	Venue	Ref.
1951	Four Twelves Are 48	Anton	48th Street Theatre, Broadway	
1954	Abie's Irish Rose	Solomon Levy	Holiday Theatre, Broadway	
1956	The Seagull	Yevgeny Sergeyevitch Dorn	4th Street Theatre, Off-Broadway	
1959	Only in America	I. Birnbaum	Cort Theatre, Broadway	
1960	The Deadly Game	Emile Carpeau	Longacre Theatre, Broadway	
1963–64	She Loves Me	Mr. Maraczek	Eugene O'Neill Theatre, Broadway	
