= Louis Jourdan =

French actor (1921–2015)

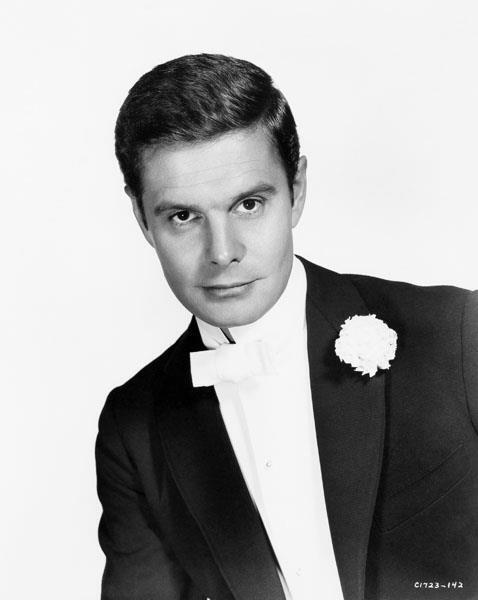
- Jourdan in Gigi (1958)
- Born: Louis Robert Gendre; 19 June 1921; Marseille, France
- Died: 14 February 2015 (aged 93); Beverly Hills, California, U.S.
- Occupation: Actor
- Years active: 1939–1992
- Spouse: Berthe Frédérique Takar (m. 1946; died 2014)
- Children: 1

Louis Jourdan (born Louis Robert Gendre; 19 June 1921 – 14 February 2015) was a French film and television actor. He was known for his suave roles in several Hollywood films, including Alfred Hitchcock's The Paradine Case (1947), Letter from an Unknown Woman (1948), Gigi (1958), The Best of Everything (1959), The V.I.P.s (1963) and Octopussy (1983). He played Dracula in the 1977 BBC television production Count Dracula.

== Early life ==
Jourdan was born Louis Robert Gendre in Marseille, France, in 1921, one of three sons of Yvonne (née Jourdan) and Henry Gendre, a hotel owner. He was educated in France, Turkey, and the UK, and studied acting at the École Dramatique. While there, he began acting on the professional stage, where he was brought to the attention of director Marc Allégret, who hired him to work as an assistant camera operator on Entrée des Artistes (The Curtain Rises). Allegret then cast Jourdan in what should have been his first movie, Le Corsaire in 1939 opposite Charles Boyer. Filming was interrupted by the Second World War and was never resumed.

== World War II ==
During the war he was hired by Marcel L'Herbier to appear in La Comédie du bonheur (1940) in Rome. He was making Untel Père et Fils in that city when Italy declared war on France. He returned to France, and appeared in Premier rendez-vous (1941) with Danielle Darrieux, shot in Paris. He spent a year on a work gang. Jourdan was ordered to make German propaganda films, which he refused to do, and fled to join his family in unoccupied France. There, he started making movies again, ten films in two years. They included several for Allegret: Parade en sept nuits (1941); L'Arlésienne (1942) with Raimu, The Beautiful Adventure (1942); Les Petites du quai aux fleurs (1944); Twilight (1944). He was in The Heart of a Nation (1943) with Raimu; La Vie de Bohème (1945).

His father was arrested by the Gestapo; months later he escaped, and joined the French Resistance, along with his family. "I was given work to do and I did it", said Louis later of his time in the resistance. "I worked on illegal leaflets, helping to print and distribute them." After the liberation of France in 1945, he returned to Paris with his childhood sweetheart, Berthe Frédérique Takar (nicknamed "Quique"). They married in Paris on 11 March 1946.

== Hollywood career ==
=== David O. Selznick ===
Cited by author James McKay as the "epitome of the suave Continental", Jourdan was spotted in a French film by a talent scout working for David O. Selznick, who offered the actor a contract in March 1946.

His first American film was The Paradine Case (1947) starring Gregory Peck. The movie is a drama directed by Alfred Hitchcock, who did not want Jourdan cast as the valet in the film. He appeared in a theatre production of Ghosts in Los Angeles. Jourdan frequently argued with Selznick, who put him on suspension a number of times for refusing roles. Selznick announced Jourdan and Alida Valli for Rupert of Hentzau but the film was not made. Neither was Trilby which Selznick said Jourdan would appear in with Valli and Rossano Brazzi or If This Be My Heart with Valli and Robert Mitchum.

With Joan Fontaine, Jourdan starred in the Max Ophüls film Letter from an Unknown Woman (1948). David Thomson in 2010 observed how his performance as Stefan Brand altered as the character aged over the extended period of the film's narrative: "I notice how his way of talking has changed. The younger Stefan was boyish, eager and open. Ten years later, the man is filled with self-loathing and fake ironies." It was a "signature performance" from Jourdan, Thomson wrote in Have You Seen?, he was "handsome yet a touch empty; romantic yet not entirely there." John Houseman, the film's producer, "felt he lacked sex appeal, but that shortcoming serves very well as his defect of memory", a significant element of the film's plot. In Hollywood, Jourdan became friends with several stars who shared his love of the game of croquet.

Enterprise borrowed him for No Minor Vices (1948), a box office flop. It was released by MGM, who borrowed Jourdan to appear in Madame Bovary (1949). Selznick announced him for The Frenchman and the Bobbysoxer a sequel to The Bachelor and the Bobby-Soxer but it was not made. Selznick sold his interest in Jourdan for one film to Warner Bros. All Jourdan's Hollywood films had lost money. He decided to buy out his contract with Selznick for $50,000.

=== Post-Selznick ===
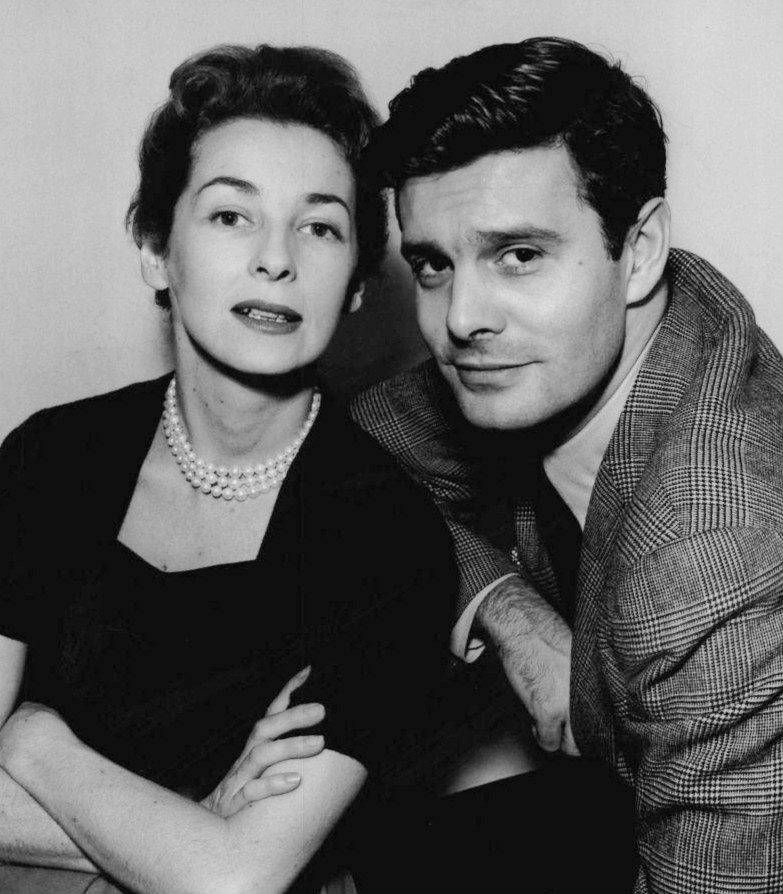
Jourdan with Felicia Montealegre (1955)

Credit page from Playbill for Boston tryout of On a Clear Day You Can See Forever (1965)

At 20th Century Fox, Jourdan played the lead in a remake of Bird of Paradise (1951). The studio kept him on to appear in Anne of the Indies (1951), directed by Jacques Tourneur. He was announced for the romantic male lead in the Fox remake of Les Misérables but ended up not appearing in the film. He appeared in the comedy, The Happy Time (1952). He was reunited with Joan Fontaine for Decameron Nights (1953) then returned home to France to make Rue de l'Estrapade (1953). After appearing in Three Coins in the Fountain (1954), Jourdan made his Broadway début in the lead role in the Billy Rose stage adaptation of André Gide's novel, The Immoralist.

He returned to Broadway for a short run in 1955, and also that year he made his American TV début as Inspector Beaumont in the TV series Paris Precinct. In 1956, he appeared in the film The Swan playing the role of "Dr Nicholas Agi" along with Grace Kelly and Alec Guinness for MGM. This was Kelly's last film, and lost money at the box office. More popular was Julie (1956) a thriller where Jourdan tormented Doris Day.

He returned to France to play the male lead in The Bride Is Much Too Beautiful (1956) with Brigitte Bardot as the lead actress, and Escapade (1957). In Britain he appeared in a swashbuckler, Dangerous Exile (1957).

Jourdan appeared in his biggest hit playing the romantic lead alongside Leslie Caron and Maurice Chevalier in the film version of the novella by Colette, Gigi (1958). This film won nine Academy Awards, including Best Picture. He enjoyed another hit with The Best of Everything (1959), an all star romance in the vein of Three Coins in the Fountain. He also appeared in a variety show on TV, An Evening with Louis Jourdan. Jourdan was going to follow it in a remake of Dr Jekyll and Mr Hyde in England for Terence Fisher. "It's a terrific change of pace for me", he said. However he did not appear in the final film, The Two Faces of Dr. Jekyll.

Jourdan co-starred with Frank Sinatra, Chevalier and Shirley MacLaine in the musical Can-Can (1960). He travelled to Italy to appear in a peplum film, Amazons of Rome (1961). Then it was back to France to star in a version of The Count of Monte Cristo (1961), a massive hit in France. Disorder (1962) was an Italian-French comedy, Mathias Sandorf (1963) was based on a novel by Jules Verne. For MGM, he made The V.I.P.s (1963).

Jourdan sang in the Alan Jay Lerner/Barton Lane stage musical, On a Clear Day You Can See Forever (1965), at least during its out-of-town tryout at the Colonial Theatre in Boston. He was replaced as leading man by John Cullum before the show reached Broadway. He supported Ann-Margret in Made in Paris (1966) for MGM, then returned to Europe: The Sultans (1967), To Commit a Murder (1967), Cervantes (1967). To Die in Paris (1968) was a US TV movie and A Flea in Her Ear (1968), a Hollywood financed farce.

There were more TV movies: Fear No Evil (1969), Run a Crooked Mile (1970), Ritual of Evil (1970), The Great American Beauty Contest (1973). In later years, Jourdan also appeared on television, including as Dracula in 1977's Count Dracula for the BBC, and as a murderous food critic in the 1978 Columbo episode "Murder Under Glass".

=== Later career ===
During the 1970s, Jourdan recorded a series of spoken word albums of the Babar the Elephant books that were released by Caedmon Records.

Jourdan later played Anton Arcane in the movie Swamp Thing (1982) and in its sequel The Return of Swamp Thing (1989). In 1983, Jourdan played the villainous Kamal Khan in the James Bond movie Octopussy. He said at the time he earned most of his money over the past ten years doing commercials:

I take them so seriously that I participate in the original concept and the actual writing. After all, whatever an actor is doing, he's a salesman, so why not commercials? I must confess I love the theater best, though. I've never done a play I didn't like, but one often does movies just to keep functioning. They're less important to me than plays.

In 1985, Jourdan appeared in a stage revival of Gigi. He played the role of French educator, historian and Baron, Pierre de Coubertin (1863–1937), in The First Olympics: Athens 1896, a May 1984 NBC TV (2-part) mini-series about the 1896 Summer Olympics and the American team member/discus thrower from Baltimore, Robert Garrett (1875–1961). His last film role was eight years later in Year of the Comet (1992).

== Personal life ==
Jourdan and his wife had one child, Louis Henry George Jourdan, sometimes called Louis Henry Jourdan Jr. The marriage lasted until her death in 2014. Louis Henry Jourdan was born on October 6, 1951 and died of a narcotics overdose at the age of 29 on May 12, 1981. His body was buried at Westwood Village Memorial Park Cemetery in Los Angeles, later joined by his parents.

After his retirement from acting in 1992 Jourdan lived in Los Angeles. In July 2010 he was made a Chevalier de la Légion d'honneur, an honor that he received accompanied by friends, including Sidney Poitier and Kirk Douglas.

Jourdan has two stars on the Hollywood Walk of Fame at 6153 and 6445 Hollywood Boulevard.

== Death ==
Jourdan died at his home in Beverly Hills on 14 February 2015 at the age of 93.

== Filmography ==
Year	Title	Role	Notes
1939	Le Corsaire (The Pirate)		Film never completed
1940	La Comédie du bonheur	Fédor	(Italy: Ecco la felicità) (England Comedy of Happiness)
1941	Her First Affair	Pierre Rougemont	(France: Premier rendez-vous)
1941	Parade en sept nuits	Freddy Richard, le clown	
1942	L'Arlésienne	Frédéri	
1942	The Beautiful Adventure	André d'Éguzon	
1943	The Heart of a Nation	Christian	Uncredited
1944	Les Petites du quai aux fleurs	Francis	
1944	Félicie Nanteuil (US: Twilight)	Robert de Ligny	
1945	La Vie de Boheme	Rodolphe / Rodolfo	
1947	The Paradine Case	André Latour, Paradine's Valet	
1948	Letter from an Unknown Woman	Stefan Brand	
1948	No Minor Vices	Octavio Quaglini	
1949	Madame Bovary	Rodolphe Boulanger	
1951	Bird of Paradise	André Laurence	
1951	Anne of the Indies	Captain Pierre François La Rochelle	
1952	The Happy Time	Uncle Desmond Bonnard	
1953	Paris Precinct	Insp. Beaumont	TV (15 episodes, 1953–1955)
1953	Decameron Nights	Giovanni Boccaccio / Paganino / Giulio / Don Bertando	
1953	Rue de l'Estrapade	Henri Laurent	
1954	Three Coins in the Fountain	Prince Dino di Cessi	
1956	The Swan	Dr. Nicholas Agi	
1956	Julie	Lyle Benton	
1956	The Bride Is Much Too Beautiful	Michel	
1957	Love in the Afternoon	Narrator	Uncredited
1957	Escapade	Frank Raphaël	
1957	Dangerous Exile	Duke Philippe de Beauvais	
1958	Gigi	Gaston Lachaille	Nominated – Golden Globe Award for Best Actor – Motion Picture Musical or Comedy; 2nd place – Golden Laurel Award for Top Male Musical Performance
1959	The Best of Everything	David Savage	
1960	Can-Can	Philipe Forrestier	
1961	Amazons of Rome	Drusco	
1961	The Count of Monte Cristo	Edmond Dantes	
1961	Dark Journey	Paul	
1962	Disorder	Tom	
1963	Mathias Sandorf	Le comte Mathias Sandorf	
1963	Irma la Douce	Narrator	Uncredited
1963	The V.I.P.s	Marc Champselle	
1966	Made in Paris	Marc Fontaine	
1966	Les Sultans	Laurent	
1967	To Commit a Murder	Charles Beaulieu	aka Peau d'espion
1967	Cervantes	Cardinal Acquaviva	
1968	To Die in Paris	Colonel Bertine Westrex	TV
1968	A Flea in Her Ear	Henri Tournel	
1969	Fear No Evil	David Sorell	TV
1969	Run a Crooked Mile	Richard Stuart	TV
1970	Ritual of Evil	David Sorell	TV
1973	The Great American Beauty Contest	Ralph Dupree	TV
1975	Piange Il Telefono	Alberto Landi	
1975	The Count of Monte Cristo	De Villefort	TV
1976	L'hippopotamours	Le camionneur	
1977	The Man in the Iron Mask	D'Artagnan	TV
1977	Silver Bears	Prince di Siracusa	
1977	The More It Goes, the Less It Goes	Paul Tango	
1977	Count Dracula	Count Dracula	TV
1978	Columbo	Paul Gerard	TV episode "Murder Under Glass"
1979	The French Atlantic Affair	Captain Charles Girodt	TV
1980	Charlie's Angels	Dr. Redmond	TV episode "Nips and Tucks"
1980	Vega$	Nicholas Rambeau	TV episode "The Lido Girls"
1981	Vega$	Nicholas Rambeau	TV episode "French Twist"
1982	Romance Theatre: Gamble on Love	Host	TV
1982	Romance Theatre: Bayou Romance	Host	TV; uncredited
1982	Swamp Thing	Dr. Anton Arcane	
1983	Octopussy	Kamal Khan	
1983	Double Deal	Peter Sterling	
1984	Cover Up	George LeMare	TV
1984	The First Olympics: Athens, 1896	Pierre de Coubertin	TV
1986	Beverly Hills Madam	Douglas Corbin	TV
1986	Romance Theatre: Escape to Love	Host	TV
1987	Grand Larceny	Charles Grand	
1988	Counterforce	Kassar	
1989	The Return of Swamp Thing	Dr. Anton Arcane	
1992	Year of the Comet	Philippe	

== Selected theatre credits ==
- Serena Blandish by S.N. Behrman – La Jolla Playhouse, La Jolla, California (8–15 August 1948; with Jennifer Jones, Constance Collier, Mildred Natwick)
- The Immoralist – Royale Theatre, New York (8 February 1954 – 1 May 1954; with James Dean and Geraldine Page)
- Tonight in Samarkand – Morosco Theater, New York (16 February 1955 – 12 March 1955; with Pernell Roberts and Theodore Bikel)
- Caprice adapted by Jean Pierre Aumont – pre Broadway tryouts (spring 1959; with Claude Dauphin)
- On a Clear Day You Can See Forever – Colonial Theater, Boston (October 1965)
- The Marriage-Go-Round by Leslie Stevens – national tour (1970; with Vivian Blaine)
- Private Lives by Noël Coward – national tour (1973; with Barbara Rush)
- The Pleasure of His Company – Arlington Park Theater, Chicago (1975; with Lana Turner)
- 13 Rue de l'Amour – Arlington Park Theater, Chicago (with Leslie Caron); Phoenix Theatre London (1976; with Glynis Johns), Circle in the Square Theater, New York City (16 March 1978 – 21 May 1978; with Patricia Elliott) and Westport Country Playhouse (1978; with Taina Elg)
- Present Laughter – John Drew Theater, East Hampton, New York (July 1979)
- 12 Rue de l'Amour – Melbourne and Sydney Australia (July–August 1980; with Leslie Caron)
- Gigi – road tour (1984–85)

== Sources ==
- McKay, James (26 April 2010). Dana Andrews: The Face of Noir. Jefferson, N.C: McFarland. p. 101. ISBN 978-0-7864-5676-5.
- Minne, Olivier (2017). Louis Jourdan: Le dernier french lover d'hollywood. Paris: Séguier Editions. ISBN 978-2840497257.
- Thomson, David (2008). Have You Seen? A Personal Introduction to 1,000 Films. London: Alolen Lane. p. 466. ISBN 978-0307264619.
- Thomson, David (2002). The New Biographical Dictionary of Film. New York & London: Knopf & Little, Brown. p. 448. ISBN 0307271749.
