= Jean Martin =

French actor

- Born: 6 March 1922; Paris, France
- Died: 2 February 2009 (aged 86); Paris, France
- Occupation: Actor
- Years active: 1944-1998
- Height: 1.90m / 6 ft 3 in

Jean Martin (6 March 1922 – 2 February 2009) was a French actor of stage and screen. Martin served in the French Resistance during World War II and later fought with the French paratroopers in Indochina. Theatrically, he is perhaps best known for originating two roles in Samuel Beckett's most famous plays: Lucky in Waiting for Godot, and Clov in Endgame. During the 1950s, he was a performer at the Théâtre National Populaire and also worked for radio plays.

Making over eighty film and television appearances, Martin is probably best remembered by international audiences for his role as the French paratroop commander Col. Mathieu in The Battle of Algiers (1965), as the gunslinger Sullivan in Sergio Leone's My Name is Nobody and as the laconic OAS adjutant Viktor Wolenski in The Day of the Jackal (both 1973). He had one of the lead roles in the 1968 French mini-series Les Compagnons de Baal.

Most of his other screen work was in French or European cinema, though his stage performances gained him much more recognition and acclaim. Martin was also an active political leftist, and was fired from the Théâtre National Populaire for signing the manifesto of the 121 against the Algerian War. He was also blacklisted from radio work and remained unemployed for a time as a result.

Martin was hired for The Battle of Algiers because director Gillo Pontecorvo was looking for a little-known professional actor to play the part of Col. Mathieu. Martin had by then worked extensively on stage, but had done just a few appearances on screen. Enjoying movie work and wishing to develop his film career, Martin tried for the part and was hired. Martin later explained that his working relationship with Pontecorvo on the set of The Battle of Algiers was often difficult, as the director otherwise hired non-professional actors for the film. Martin, as the film's only professional actor, was sometimes uncomfortable working with untrained performers, while Pontecorvo was worried that their acting styles might be too different from each other and work against the picture. Nevertheless, Martin was ultimately very happy with the film.

Jean Martin continued working on stage and on screen, playing a variety of supporting roles in French films and television productions. He also provided the voice of L'oiseau in the animation feature film Le Roi et l'oiseau.

Martin died from cancer in Paris on 2 February 2009, aged 86.

== Selected filmography ==
- Cecile Is Dead (1944) - Le garçon d'étage (uncredited)
- The Hunchback of Notre Dame (1956) - Un tire-laine (uncredited)
- Fortunat (1960) - Un croque-mort (uncredited)
- Paris Belongs to Us (1961)
- Les Culottes rouges (1962) - Un homme de la troupe (uncredited)
- Ballade pour un voyou (1963) - Le chef de la P.J.
- À toi de faire... mignonne (1963)
- The Nun (1966) - Monsieur Hébert
- The Battle of Algiers (1966) - Col. Mathieu
- Kiss Me General (1966) - Monnier
- Manon 70 (1968) - Hotelman
- Je t'aime, je t'aime (1968) - Un responsible d'édition
- Faut pas prendre les enfants du bon Dieu pour des canards sauvages (1968) - Un homme de main de Charles (uncredited)
- A Golden Widow (1969) - Un lieutenant
- Cran d'arrêt (1970) - Le majordome
- L'apocalypse (1970)
- Promise at Dawn (1970) - Igor Igorevitch
- Laisse aller... c'est une valse (1971) - Homme de Varèse
- Le Rempart des béguines (1972) - Rene
- The Inheritor (1973) - Mgr. Schneider
- The Day of the Jackal (1973) - Adjutant Viktor Wolenski
- My Name Is Nobody (1973) - Sullivan
- Successive Slidings of Pleasure (1974) - Le prêtre
- Le cri du coeur (1974) - M. Bunkermann
- I'm Losing My Temper (1974) - Proviseur / Headmaster
- Il tempo dell'inizio (1974)
- Rosebud (1975)
- Fear Over the City (1975) - Le commissaire divisionnaire, Sabin
- La Course à l'échalote (1975) - Le directeur de la banque
- The Messiah (1975) - Pontius Pilate
- A Genius, Two Partners and a Dupe (1975) - Colonel Pembroke
- L'hippopotamours (1976) - Le gorille
- The Wing or the Thigh (1976) - Le médecin
- A Woman at Her Window (1976) - Drieu La Rochelle (uncredited)
- Le Juge Fayard dit Le Shériff (1977) - Le docteur
- The Cat (1977) - Legrand
- Black-Out (1977) - Le psychiatre
- Dossier 51 (1978) - Vénus
- The Associate (1979) - Bastias
- Bête, mais discipliné (1979) - Le directeur de l'hôtel
- The Woman Cop (1980) - Le colonel
- The King and the Mockingbird (1980) - L'oiseau (voice)
- Eclipse sur un ancien chemin vers Compostelle (1980)
- Julien Fontanes, magistrat (1980) - The prefect
- Inspector Blunder (1980) - L'examinateur (uncredited)
- La Puce et le Privé (1981) - Gérard Le Tizou, le maître d'hôtel
- Justinien Trouvé, ou le bâtard de Dieu (1993)
- Lucie Aubrac (1997) - Paul Lardanchet
