= Hitched =

Hitched may refer to:

- Hitched (1971 film), an American made-for-television film

== See also ==
- Hitched or Ditched
