= Tumultes =

Tumultes may refer to:

- Tumultes (1990 film)
- Tumultes (1932 film)
