= Bayou Romance =

- Starring: Michael Ansara; Annie Potts; Michael Durrell; Virginia Capers; Louis Jourdan (host)
- Original language: English

Original release
- Release: 1982

Bayou Romance is a 1982 television film and part of the Romance Theatre series.
