= Le Corsaire (film) =

- Directed by: Marc Allégret
- Written by: Marc Allégret; Marcel Achard
- Based on: the play by Marcel Achard
- Starring: Michèle Alfa; Marcel André; Charles Boyer; Louis Jourdan
- Release date: 1939
- Country: France
- Language: French

Le Corsaire ("The Pirate") is an unfinished 1939 French film. It would have marked the screen debut of Louis Jourdan.

== Plot ==
Some actors put on a play about a pirate, and find themselves encountering similarities from the play in their own lives.

== Production ==
The screenplay was based on a play by Marcel Achard. Charles Boyer returned from Hollywood to appear in the movie which was filmed at Victorine Studios in Nice, August – September 1939. However production ceased on the declaration of war and Boyer returned to America. The film was never completed, although some footage of it was later released.

A documentary about the making of the movie was released in 1995.
