= Run a Crooked Mile =

- Genre: Drama
- Written by: Trevor Wallace
- Directed by: Gene Levitt
- Starring: Louis Jourdan; Mary Tyler Moore; Wilfrid Hyde-White
- Theme music composer: Mike Leander
- Country of origin: United Kingdom
- Original language: English

Production
- Executive producer: Charles F. Engel
- Producer: Ian Lewis
- Production locations: Geneva, Switzerland; London, England
- Cinematography: Arthur Grant
- Editor: Bert Rule
- Running time: 100 min.
- Production company: Universal Television

Original release
- Network: NBC
- Release: November 18, 1969

Run a Crooked Mile is a 1969 British made-for-television thriller film directed by Gene Levitt and starring Louis Jourdan.

== Plot ==
Richard Stuart, an English schoolteacher on holiday, is a witness to a murder among a group of wealthy men in a secluded mansion in the English countryside. When he reports it to the police, however, no evidence of the group or any murder can be found, only a golden key on the floor. When he tries to investigate further he is knocked unconscious. He wakes up in a hospital room in Geneva (after an apparent polo accident) and is astounded to discover that two years have elapsed, during which he has been unhappily married to a beautiful woman, Elizabeth (Mary Tyler Moore) and living a rich and extravagant life under the name Tony Sutton. Gradually realising that Elizabeth is genuine, and not part of a conspiracy against him, he asks her to help him understand how he got into his situation, and what to do about it. They return to England, and eventually to the secluded mansion.

== Reception ==
Acclaimed for its original premise, stylish photography (by Arthur Grant) and use of exotic locations, the film has managed to develop a cult following. In 2018, the film was released on DVD by the German Label PIDAX, with a running time of only 93 min.

== Cast ==
- Louis Jourdan - Richard Stuart
- Mary Tyler Moore - Elizabeth Sutton
- Wilfrid Hyde-White - Dr. Ralph Sawyer
- Stanley Holloway - Caretaker
- Alexander Knox - Sir Howard Nettleton
- Terence Alexander - Peter Martin
- Ronald Howard - Insp. Huntington
- Laurence Naismith - Lord Dunnsfield
- Norman Bird - Sgt. Hooper
- Ernest Clark - Chairman
- Bernard Archard - Business spokesman
- Margaret Nolan - Secretary
- Jean Anderson - Sister Teresa
- Nora Nicholson - Miss Abernathy
