= Paris Precinct =

- Starring: Louis Jourdan; Claude Dauphin
- Country of origin: United States
- Original language: English
- No. of seasons: 2
- No. of episodes: 26

Production
- Producer: Andre Hakim
- Running time: 30 minutes
- Production company: Ziv Television Programs

Original release
- Network: ABC
- Release: 1955

Paris Precinct is an American television series starring Claude Dauphin and Louis Jourdan that aired on ABC in 1955. Although set and shot in France, it was filmed in English. The stories were based on Sûreté files. Dauphin and Jourdan portrayed inspectors Bolbec and Beaumont, respectively. Episodes were 30 minutes long in black and white.

== Production ==
Andre Hakim was the producer, Charles Haas was the director, and William Robson was the writer. A production of Ziv Television Programs, the series was also known as World Crime Hunt.

== Critical response ==
A review in the trade publication Billboard said that Paris Precinct "should be of interest to melodrama fans looking for something offbeat." The review noted the program's fast pace, established by components that included "rooftop chases, bar fights and other assorted plot-action devices".
