= Billy Goldenberg =

American composer (1936–2020)

Background information
- Born: William Leon Goldenberg; February 10, 1936; Brooklyn, New York, U.S.
- Died: August 3, 2020 (aged 84) New York City, New York, U.S.
- Genre: Film score
- Occupations: Composer, songwriter
- Years active: 1968–2017

William Leon Goldenberg (February 10, 1936 – August 3, 2020) was an American composer and songwriter, best known for his work on television and film.

== Early life ==
Goldenberg was born on February 10, 1936 in Brooklyn, New York. His mother played the violin, and she taught him how to play the violin and the viola. Then he played it in chamber and symphonic groups. His father was a staff percussionist at WOR and the NBC Symphonic Orchestra. At age five, he played piano and sang Broadway shows.

He wanted a musical career but since his father was laid off, he was dissuaded in the early 1950s. Instead of attending Juilliard, he studied physics and mathematics at Columbia College.

== Career ==
After college, Goldenberg was a computer programmer, but he quit the job due to an ulcer. He found work as a pianist and arranger. He was hired to write the soundtrack for comedy sketches of Mike Nichols and Elaine May in the Broadway show, An Evening with Nichols and May.

In the mid-1960s, Goldenberg met Steven Spielberg at Universal Studios. He started to compose music for Spielberg's television episodes on shows such as The Name Of The Game, Night Gallery, Columbo, and the 1971 TV film, Duel. His other film scores included the Elvis Presley film Change of Habit (1969), The Grasshopper (1970), Red Sky at Morning (1971), The Last of Sheila (1973), Busting (1974), The Domino Principle (1977) and Reuben, Reuben (1983). He also wrote music for Rhoda including its theme song, Columbo, and the first two episodes of Kojak, including the theme tune.

Additionally he wrote scores for Woody Allen's Play It Again, Sam (1972) and Up the Sandbox (1972). Later on, he was praised for all his works and his score for the Sandbox movie was considered 'the real pulse of the movie' and also if the score could be turned into a song. He wrote the song "If I Close My Eyes" for the Sandbox movie and then won an Emmy Award for the score of Queen of the Stardust Ballroom (1975). He earned 3 Emmy Awards for The Lives of Benjamin Franklin (1974), King and Rage of Angels. He also scored many TV movies, such as Fear No Evil (1969), Ritual of Evil (1970), Don't Be Afraid of the Dark (1973), Double Indemnity (1973), The UFO Incident (1975), Helter Skelter (1976), One of My Wives Is Missing (1976), The Lindbergh Kidnapping Case (1976), Mary Jane Harper Cried Last Night (1977), The Cracker Factory (1979), Crisis at Central High (1981), This House Possessed (1981), The Best Little Girl in the World (1981) and Massarati and the Brain (1982), and TV miniseries including The Gangster Chronicles (1981), Rage of Angels (1983), The Atlanta Child Murders (1985), Kane and Abel (1985) and Around the World in 80 Days (1989).
