= Hotel Imperial (1939 film) =

- Directed by: Robert Florey
- Written by: Gilbert Gabriel; Robert Thoeren
- Based on: Hotel Imperial by Lajos Bíró
- Starring: Isa Miranda; Ray Milland
- Cinematography: William C. Mellor
- Edited by: Chandler House
- Distributed by: Paramount Pictures
- Release date: 1939
- Running time: 67 minutes
- Country: United States
- Language: English
- Budget: >$1,000,000

Hotel Imperial is a 1939 American dramatic film directed by Robert Florey. It stars Isa Miranda and Ray Milland.

== Cast ==
- Isa Miranda as Anna Warschawska
- Ray Milland as Lieutenant Nemassy
- Reginald Owen as General Videnko
- Gene Lockhart as Elias
- J. Carrol Naish as Kuprin
- Curt Bois as Anton
- Henry Victor as Sultanov
- Albert Dekker as Sergeant
- Ernő Verebes as Ivan
- Robert Middlemass as General Von Schwartzberg
- Michel Werboff as Russian Sergeant
- Spencer Charters as Visoff
- Betty Compson as Soubrette
- Bodil Rosing as Ratty Old Woman
- Wolfgang Zilzer as Limping Tenor

== Production ==
Lajos Bíró's play Hotel Imperial was adapted into a silent film in 1927. Paramount Pictures started production on an adaption of the play in the 1930s under the title Invitation to Happiness, to please its lead actor Marlene Dietrich. Lewis Milestone was meant to direct the film, but production on Anything Goes took too long resulting in Henry Hathaway being selected. Fritz Lang and Richard Boleslawski were considered for the directorial role. The script was written by Arnold Belgard and Franz Schulz. Melchior Lengyel and John Van Druten also worked on the script.

Dietrich refused to perform unless the script was changed due to its negative depiction of her role. The film's producer, Benjamin Glazer, left after four days of shooting in protest of Dietrich's control over the film and was replaced by Ernst Lubitsch. The script was edited by Hathaway and Grover Jones and retitled the film to I Loved a Soldier. Lubitsch was removed from his position at Paramount during production causing further disagreements between Dietrich and Hathaway, who stated that she became "a monster of her own making", before she left the film.

Merle Oberon was offered Dietrich's role, but declined the offer. Margaret Sullavan was selected to replace Dietrich and the film was retitled to Hotel Imperial. Hathaway supported her selection, stating that "She didn't care how ugly she looked", due to her acceptance of the negative role. However, Paramount wanted to use footage of Dietrich and have Sullavan attempt to resemble her in order to have the footage match. Hathaway left the film after Sullavan injured herself while flirting with Stuart Erwin and needed months to recover. Bette Davis, Elissa Landi, and Claudette Colbert were offered to replace Sullavan, but declined causing Paramount to end production on the film.

In 1938, Walter Wanger offered to restart production on the film with Dietrich as the lead. Dietrich, who appeared in multiple box office failures and was declared box office poison, accepted the proposal. Wanger brought Hathaway back after telling him of Dietrich's return. However, Dietrich demanded that Josef von Sternberg be selected to direct the film. Hathaway stated "Tell her to fuck off".

Isa Miranda was hired to replace Dietrich and the script was significantly altered, including changing Anna Warschawska from a maid to a famous actor. Robert Florey was selected to direct the film. Filming using a script written by Gilbert Gabriel and Robert Thoeren began in November 1938. Ray Milland suffered a concussion and lacerations to his left hand after an accident during a scene with a cavalry charge and needed nine stitches.

$900,000 was spent on the film while Dietrich was the lead and $100,000 was spent while Sullavan was the lead. Dietrich was paid $150,000.

== Reception ==
The Boston Evening Transcript's review of the film stated that "We daringly predict today that the next screen actress imported from Europe will be greeted by some rather blasé audiences", but praised the singing in the film. Robert W. Dana, writing in New York Herald Tribune, stated that the film was "another World War side show" and had "little real excitement". The Film Daily stated that the film was "Mild melodrama" and "unable to make up its mind where to go". Variety stated that the film was "a weak sister to be slotted on lower brackets of the dualers where a filler is needed" and that its plot was "dated and inconclusive".

B.R. Crisler, writing in The New York Times, stated that "the picture scarcely measures up to its cast, it is a good average melodrama, with rather handsomer than average costumes and settings.

== Works cited ==
- Medved, Harry; Medved, Michael (1984). The Hollywood Hall of Shame: The Most Expensive Flops in Movie History. Angus & Robertson. ISBN 0207149291.
- "Motion Picture Review Digest". Vol. 4, no. 26. H. W. Wilson Company. June 26, 1939.
