= Joanna Barnes =

American actress and writer (1934–2022)

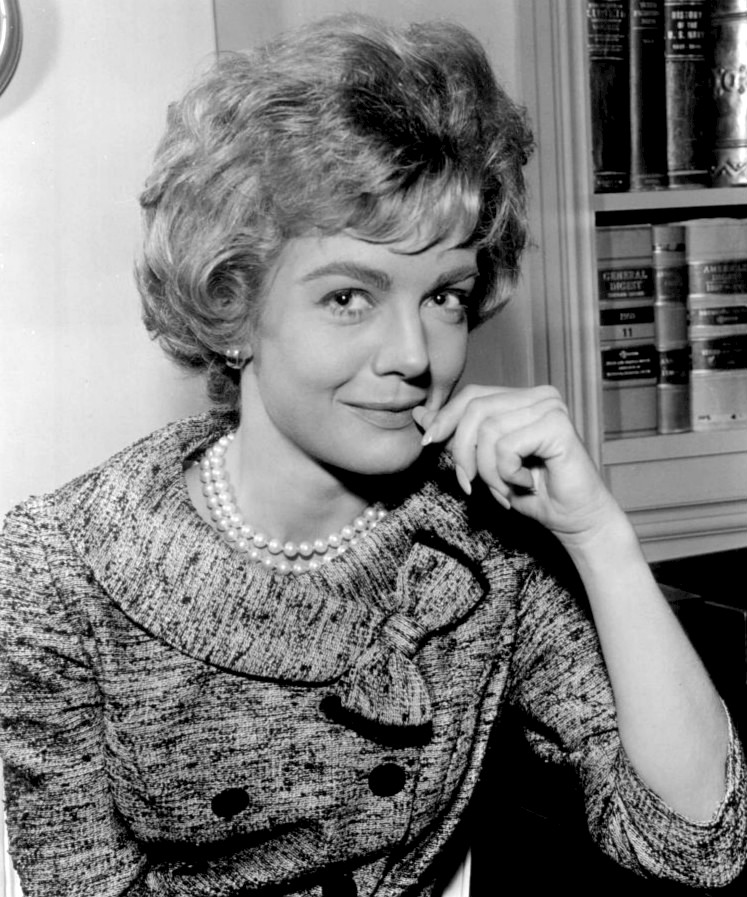
- Barnes in 1959
- Born: November 15, 1934; Boston, Massachusetts, U.S.
- Died: April 29, 2022 (aged 87); Sea Ranch, California, U.S.
- Education: Smith College
- Occupations: Actress; writer
- Years active: 1956–2002
- Spouses: Richard Herndon (m. 1955; div. 1956); Lawrence Dobkin (m. 1961; div. 1967); Jack Lionel Warner (m. 1980; died 2012)

Joanna Barnes (November 15, 1934 – April 29, 2022) was an American actress and writer.

== Early life and education ==
Barnes was born in Boston, to John Pindar Barnes (1908–1970) and the former Alice Weston Mutch (1908–1980). She had two younger sisters, Alice and Judith, and grew up in Hingham, Massachusetts. Barnes attended Milton Academy and then Smith College, from which she graduated in 1956 as a member of Phi Beta Kappa. She majored in English. Barnes received the college's award for poetry, the immediate successor to Sylvia Plath for this recognition. Her research for a magazine article about making movies led to a career change to acting.

== Career ==
=== Television ===
Barnes' initial appearance on television was in the episode "The Man Who Beat Lupo" on Ford Theatre. She made guest appearances on many television series, including the ABC/Warner Bros. programs 77 Sunset Strip and Maverick, CBS's Have Gun - Will Travel, and the crime drama Richard Diamond, Private Detective. In 1961, she guest-starred on The Untouchables episode "90 Proof Dame" as the wife of a French exporter of brandy.

Barnes appeared as Kate Henniger, with Bing Russell and Arthur Space in the 1958 episode "Ghost Town" of the ABC/WB Western series Colt .45, starring Wayde Preston. In 1959, she portrayed Lola in the NBC detective series 21 Beacon Street.

In the 1960s, Barnes worked for producer Martin Ransohoff and appeared in episodes of his The Beverly Hillbillies ("Elly Goes to School" and "The Clampett Look") and was billed as special guest-star. Barnes played Peter Falk's former wife on the 1965–1966 CBS series The Trials of O'Brien and was host of the ABC daytime talk show Dateline: Hollywood in 1967.

She appeared as Barbara Soames, a beautiful heiress turned hit woman involved in the murder of a Chicago mobster in season 4, episode 22 of Hawaii Five-O, titled "Didn’t We Meet at a Murder?".

She was also a frequent panellist in the early years of the syndicated version of What's My Line?. On December 19, 1972, Barnes appeared on The Merv Griffin Show with Joan Fontaine, Zsa Zsa Gabor and Dan Martino (founder of the Dan Martino School for Men). She appeared in season 7 episode 22 of Cheers. The Visiting Lecher May 4, 1989

=== Film ===
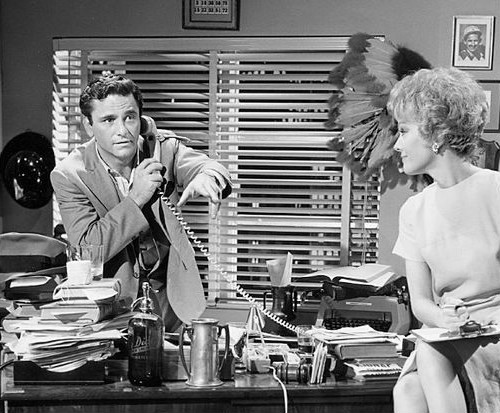
With Peter Falk in The Trials of O'Brien (1965)

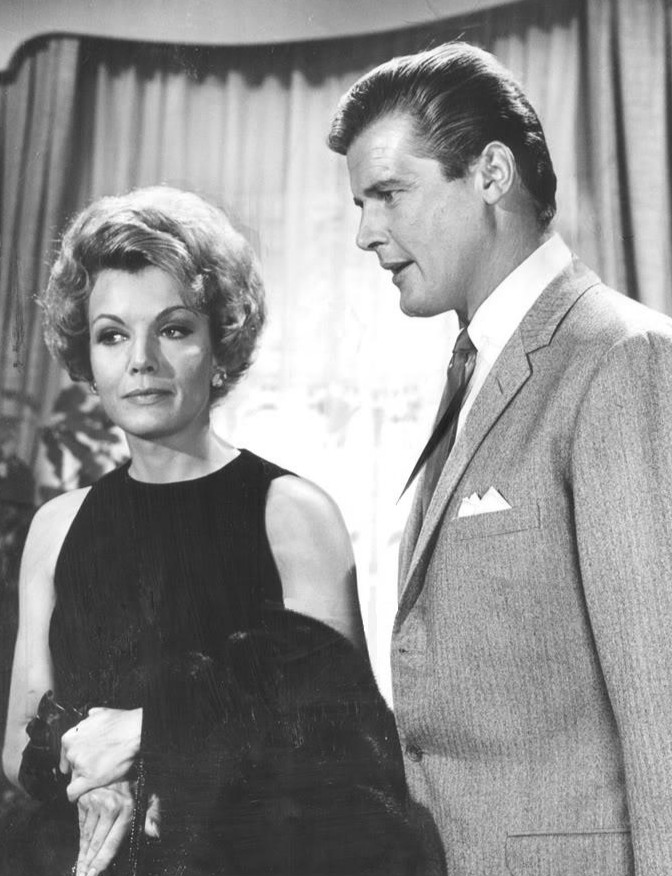
With Roger Moore in The Trials of O'Brien

Barnes moved to Los Angeles soon after finishing her education, and took up a contract with Columbia Pictures. She went on to have roles in more than 20 films. Among her most remembered roles is the snooty Gloria Upson in the film Auntie Mame (1958), which earned her a Golden Globe Award nomination for New Star of the Year. Barnes became the 13th actress to play Jane when she appeared in Tarzan, the Ape Man (1959), with Denny Miller as Tarzan. She played the younger of the two Roman women who visited Peter Ustinov's gladiator school and thoughtlessly provoked a slave rebellion 1960's Spartacus. In Disney's original 1961 version of The Parent Trap starring Hayley Mills, Barnes played gold-digger Vicki Robinson, who temporarily comes between Maureen O'Hara and Brian Keith. In the 1998 remake starring Lindsay Lohan, she played Vicki Blake, the mother of the child-hating gold-digger and fiancée Meredith Blake (Elaine Hendrix). In 1967, she appeared in The War Wagon, a Western movie starring John Wayne and Kirk Douglas.

=== Writing ===
Barnes was also a writer and columnist. In 1973, she told newspaper columnist Dick Kleiner that she liked writing because "it is something you do yourself. With acting, if you win an Oscar or an Emmy, you have to thank everybody. If you write a book, it is completely your own."

She wrote a book, Starting from Scratch, about home decorating and several novels, including The Deceivers (1970), Who Is Carla Hart? (1973), Pastora (1980), and Silverwood (1985). She wrote a weekly book review for the Los Angeles Times, and her column "Touching Home" was carried by the Chicago Tribune and the New York News Syndicate.

== Personal life ==
Barnes was married three times. Her marriages to Richard Herndon in 1955 and Lawrence Dobkin in 1961 ended in divorce; her marriage to Jack Lionel Warner ended with his death in 2012.

== Death ==
Barnes died at her home in Sea Ranch, California, on April 29, 2022, aged 87. (Some sources erroneously gave her age at death as 89, although the 1940 U.S. census gives her age as of May 9, 1940 as 5 years.) She was survived by her stepchildren and sisters.

== Select filmography ==
Year	Title	Role	Notes
1956	Tales of the 77th Bengal Lancers		Episode: "The Regiment"
1957	Ford Theatre	Ileana	Episode: "The Man Who Beat Lupo"
1957	Playhouse 90	Ellen Blackwell	Episode: "The Blackwell Story"
1957	The Garment Jungle	Bit Model (uncredited)	
1957	Conflict	Betty Callister; Laura Ferris	Episode: "Anything for Money"; Episode: "The Velvet Cage"
1957–1960	Maverick	Various	5 episodes
1957	Cheyenne	Alice Chaney	Episode: "Devil's Canyon"
1958	Cheyenne	Adelaide Marshall	Episode "Dead to Rights"
1958	Colt .45	Kate Henniger	Episode: "Ghost Town"
1958	Violent Road	Peg Lawrence	
1958	Onionhead	Snobbish Girl at Party (uncredited)	
1958	Home Before Dark	Cathy Bergner	
1958	Steve Canyon	Joan Richards	Episode: "Operation Diplomat"
1958	Auntie Mame	Gloria Upson	
1959	Beach Patrol	Edie West	Television film
1959	21 Beacon Street	Lola/Joanna	11 episodes
1959	Tarzan, the Ape Man	Jane Parker	
1959	Hawaiian Eye	Rikki Whitman	Episode: "A Dime a Dozen"
1960	M Squad	Tammy Worth	Episode: "The Twisted Way"
1960	Philip Marlowe	Lois Conway	Episode: "Death Takes a Lover"
1960	The Millionaire	Karen Summers	Episode: "Millionaire Karen Summers"
1960	The Man from Blackhawk	Colette	Episode: "Remember Me Not"
1960	Mr. Lucky	Laura Lawrence	Episode: "Taking a Chance"
1960	General Electric Theater	Princess Camilla	Episode: "The Ugly Duckling"
1960	Alcoa Theatre	Eve Fremont	Episode: "333 Montgomery Street"
1960	Richard Diamond, Private Detective	Joyce Long	Episode: "The Lovely Fraud"
1960	Dante		Episode: "One for the Birds"
1960	Spartacus	Claudia Marius	
1960	Adventures in Paradise	Diane Winthrope	Episode: "Incident in Suva"
1960	The Tab Hunter Show		Episode: "Portia Go Home"
1961	The Tab Hunter Show	Isabelle	Episode: "Dream Boy"
1961	Bringing Up Buddy	Marcia Sutter	Episode: "Buddy's Transfer"
1961	Michael Shayne	Nora	Episode: "Final Settlement"
1961	Stagecoach West	Ruby Sanders	Episode: "The Outcasts"
1961	The Untouchables	Marquise de Bouverais / Marcie McKuen	Episode: "90-Proof Dame"
1961	The Parent Trap	Vicky Robinson	
1961	The Bob Cummings Show	Amanda Caulfield	Episode: "Executive Sweet"
1961	The Investigators	Georgette	Episode: "In a Mirror, Darkly"
1961	Target: The Corruptors!	Ann Fielding	Episode: "The Golden Carpet"
1961	The Purple Hills	Amy Carter	
1961	Follow the Sun	Doris #1	Episode: "The Primitive Clay"
1961	Cain's Hundred	Carol Cheston	Episode: "Five for One"
1962	Laramie	Ruth; Lucy Barton	Episode: "This Barefoot Kid"; Episode: "War Hero"
1962	Sam Benedict	Cordelia Montagne	Episode: "Tears for a Nobody Doll"
1962	Have Gun-Will Travel	Penelope Lacey	Episode: "Penelope"
1962	Alcoa Premiere	Sylvia Dorn	Episode: "Mr. Easy"
1963	Alcoa Premiere	Aggie McCrae	Episode: "The Glass Palace"
1963	The Eleventh Hour	Dr. Sarah Crowley	Episode: "My Name Is Judith, I'm Lost, You See"
1963	Empire	Neva Bradford	Episode: "Down There, the World"
1963	The Beverly Hillbillies	Cynthia Fenwick	Episode: "Elly Starts to School"; Episode: "The Clampett Look"
1963	77 Sunset Strip	Lisa Cabot	Episode: "88 Bars"
1964	Arrest and Trial	Melinda Parsons	Episode: "A Circle of Strangers"
1964	The Farmer's Daughter	Monica	Episode: "The Next Mrs. Morley"
1964	Goodbye Charlie	Janie Highland	
1965	Dr. Kildare	Dr. Suzanne Shary	Episode: "Make Way for Tomorrow"
1965	Bob Hope Presents the Chrysler Theatre	Connie	Episode: "Simon Says Get Married"
1965–1966	The Trials of O'Brien	Katie O'Brien	5 episodes
1967	The War Wagon	Lola	
1967	Don't Make Waves	Diane Prescott	
1967	Too Many Thieves	Katie	
1968	Off to See the Wizard	Jane Parker	Episode: "Tarzan the Ape Man"
1968	Mannix	Phyllis Richards	S2-Episode 12: "Fear I to Fall"
1969	The Name of the Game	Ardith	Episode: "The Perfect Image"
1970	Nanny and the Professor	Lynn Carlisle	Episode: "The Scientific Approach"
1971	B.S. I Love You	Jane Ink	
1971	O'Hara, U.S. Treasury	Hannah	Episode: "Operation: Payoff"
1971	Alias Smith and Jones	Janet Judson; Mrs. Hanley	Episode: "How to Rob a Bank in One Hard Lesson"; Episode: "Miracle at Santa Marta"
1972	Hawaii Five-O	Bonnie Soames	Episode: "Didn't We Meet at a Murder?"
1972	Cool Million	Angela Balcom	Episode: "Assault on Gavaloni"
1973	Love, American Style	Faith Schiller	Episode: "Love and Legend"
1973	The New Perry Mason	Mrs. Ballinger	Episode: "The Case of the Ominous Oath"
1973	McCloud	Karen Chandler	Episode: "The Solid Gold Swingers"
1973	Marcus Welby, M.D.	Laura Daniels; Noreen Saunders	Episode: "The Working Heart"; Episode: "Death Is Only a Side Effect"
1974	Planet of the Apes	Carsia	Episode: "Up Above the World So High"
1975	SWAT	Andrea	Episode: "Death Carrier"
1975	Matt Helm	Hannah Bigelow	Episode: "Think Murder"
1975	Ellery Queen	Camellia Justice	Episode: "The Adventure of the Blunt Instrument"
1975	I Wonder Who's Killing Her Now?	Clarice Oliver	
1976	Quincy, M.E.	Margo Bentley / Barbara Miller	Episode: "Who's Who in Neverland"
1976	Executive Suite	Sharon Cody	3 episodes
1978–1979	Fantasy Island	Various	3 episodes
1979	Charlie's Angels	Julia Lathrop	Episode: "Angels on Skates"
1980	The Last Resort		Episode: "Gone with a Whim"
1980	When the Whistle Blows	Mrs. Hamilton	Episode: "Macho Man"
1980	Trapper John, M.D.	Roz Tremor	Episode: "Girl Under Glass: Part 2"
1982	Barney Miller	Mrs. Fitzjames	Episode: "Chinatown: Part 1"; Episode: "Chinatown: Part 2"
1982	Hart to Hart	Rosemary Wentworth	Episode: "Hart's Desire"
1983	Remington Steele	Claudette Crockett	Episode: "My Fair Steele"
1985	Trapper John, M.D.	Teresa Hillyer	Episode: "In the Eyes of the Beholder"
1986	Benson	Reba Sennett	Episodes: "Reel Murder" parts 1 & 2
1987	Murder, She Wrote	Lydia Barnett	Episode: "The Way to Dusty Death"
1989	Cheers	Valerie Crandell	Episode: "The Visiting Lecher"
1998	The Parent Trap	Vicky Blake	
2000	Then Came You	Lilian	Episode: "Then Came the Monthiversary"
