= Escapade (1957 film) =

- Directed by: Ralph Habib
- Written by: Marcel Archard
- Based on: short story "Cinderella and the Mob," by Cornell Woolrich (as "William Irish")
- Starring: Louis Jourdan; Dany Carrel; Roger Hanin
- Cinematography: Pierre Petit
- Edited by: Raymond Lamy
- Music by: Michel Emer
- Release date: 1957
- Country: France
- Language: French

Escapade is a 1957 French adventure film directed by Ralph Habib and starring Louis Jourdan, Dany Carrel, and Roger Hanin.

== Premise ==
Some gangsters use a young girl to get to a recently released convict who hid $10 million from a robbery just before he was caught.

== Cast ==
- Louis Jourdan : Frank Raphaël
- Dany Carrel : Agnès Mercenay
- Roger Hanin : Olivier
- Lise Delamare : Miss Mercenay
- Jean-Loup Philippe : Philippe
- Félix Martin : Angelo
- Arlette Merry : Dolly
- Marcel Bozzuffi : Raymond
- Guy Tréjan : Maurice
- Sophie Grimaldi : sister of Agnè
- Albert Rémy : José
- Jean Daurand : inspector
- José Lewgoy : Caraco
