= Ritual of Evil =

1970 television film by Robert Day

- Genre: Drama; Horror
- Based on: Richard Alan Simmons (Based on Characters Created by)
- Written by: Robert Presnell, Jr.
- Directed by: Robert Day
- Starring: Louis Jourdan
- Music by: Billy Goldenberg (as William Goldenberg)
- Country of origin: United States
- Original language: English

Production
- Producer: David Levinson
- Production locations: Universal Studios - 100 Universal City Plaza, Universal City, California, USA
- Cinematography: Lionel Lindon
- Editor: Douglas Stewart
- Running time: 98 minutes
- Production company: Universal Television

Original release
- Network: NBC
- Release: February 23, 1970

Ritual of Evil is a 1970 American made-for-television drama horror film directed by Robert Day and starring Louis Jourdan. It was made as a sequel to Fear No Evil (1969), which also starred Jourdan as Dr. Sorrell.

== Plot ==
Psychiatrist Dr. David Sorrell treats young heiress Loey Wiley, whose parents have died under mysterious circumstances. His investigation uncovers a cult, led by a powerful witch, Leila Barton. Things grow complicated as Sorrell and the witch fall in love.

== Cast ==
- Louis Jourdan as David Sorrell
- Anne Baxter as Jolene Wiley
- Diana Hyland as Leila Barton
- John McMartin as Edward Bolander
- Wilfrid Hyde-White as Harry Snowden
- Belinda Montgomery as Loey Wiley
- Carla Borelli as Aline Wiley
- Georg Stanford Brown as Larry Richmond
- Regis Cordic as the sheriff
- Dehl Berti as Mora
- Richard Alan Knox as hippie
- Johnny Williams as newscaster
- Jimmy Joyce as 1st reporter
- James LaSane as 2nd reporter

== See also ==
- List of American films of 1970
