= Fear No Evil (1969 film) =

1969 television film by Pauk Wendkos

- Genre: Horror; Thriller
- Screenplay by: Richard Alan Simmons
- Directed by: Paul Wendkos
- Starring: Louis Jourdan
- Music by: Billy Goldenberg (as William Goldenberg)
- Country of origin: United States
- Original language: English

Production
- Executive producer: David Levinson
- Producer: Richard Alan Simmons
- Production locations: Universal Studios - 100 Universal City Plaza, Universal City, California, USA
- Cinematography: Andrew J. McIntyre
- Editor: Byron Chudnow
- Running time: 98 minutes
- Production company: Universal Television

Original release
- Network: NBC
- Release: March 3, 1969

Fear No Evil is a 1969 American made-for-television horror thriller film directed by Paul Wendkos and starring Louis Jourdan as David Sorrell, a psychologist and authority on the occult who becomes involved in supernatural investigations. Wilfrid Hyde-White appears as Sorrell's mentor, Harry Snowden. Originally broadcast on March 3, 1969 as NBC's first "Movie of the Week", Fear No Evil was a pilot for a proposed television series. It performed well enough in the ratings for the network to commission a sequel television film, Ritual of Evil (1970), but it never became a series.

== Plot ==
The plot centers on a young man who dies suddenly after acquiring an antique mirror. The man's widow visits Sorrell and begins experiencing strange, eerie dreams in which her husband's image appears in the mirror. A psychologist investigates and discovers a sinister cult and ancient magic are involved.

== Cast ==
- Louis Jourdan as Dr. David Sorrell
- Lynda Day George as Barbara Anholt (as Lynda Day)
- Carroll O'Connor as Myles Donovan
- Bradford Dillman as Paul Varney
- Wilfrid Hyde-White as Harry Snowden
- Marsha Hunt as Mrs. Varney
- Katherine Woodville as Ingrid Dorne (as Katharine Woodville)
- Harry Davis as Mr. Wyant
- Ivor Barry as Lecturer
- Jeanne Buckley as Miss Bamett
- Robert Sampson as First Party Guest
- Lyn Peters as Second Party Guest
- Susan Brown as Third Party Guest

== Production ==
The Fear No Evil project was approved by the NBC programming executive Mort Werner, and the veteran film writer Guy Endore was signed on to write the story, but Endore was unable to finish the assignment and it was passed on to Richard Alan Simmons instead. Despite this, Endore received a screen credit for "story". At the time Simmons took on the writing, the film was to be called Dead of Night, but the title was changed to The Bedeviled and later to Fear No Evil.

== See also ==
- List of American films of 1969
