= The Heart of a Nation =

The Heart of a Nation (Untel père et fils)
- Directed by: Julien Duvivier
- Written by: Julien Duvivier; Marcel Achard; Charles Spaak
- Produced by: Paul Graetz
- Starring: Raimu; Michèle Morgan; Louis Jouvet
- Cinematography: Jules Kruger
- Edited by: Marthe Poncin
- Music by: Jean Wiener
- Production company: Transcontinental Films
- Distributed by: Universal Film S.A.
- Release dates: 7 April 1943 (U.S.); 9 October 1945 (France)
- Running time: 113 minutes
- Country: France
- Language: French
- Box office: 2,145,108 admissions (France) (1945)

The Heart of a Nation (French: Untel père et fils) is a 1943 French drama film directed by Julien Duvivier who co-wrote screenplay with Marcel Achard and Charles Spaak. The film stars Raimu, Michèle Morgan and Louis Jouvet.

== Plot ==
The film follows a family in Montmartre from the Franco-Prussian War to World War II.

An American release featured an introduction by Charles Boyer and scenes of the German entry into Paris.

== Principal cast ==
- Raimu as L'oncle Jules Froment
- Michèle Morgan as Marie Froment-Léonard
- Louis Jouvet as Pierre Froment / Félix Froment
- Suzy Prim as Estelle Froment adulte
- Renée Devillers as Gabrielle Froment
- Louis Jourdan as Christian (uncredited)

== Production ==
Louis Jourdan played the on screen brother of his real life brother, Pierre.

Filming started in late 1939 but was interrupted by the war.

== Release ==
The film was released in New York before France.

On January 25, 2005, the American version of the film that is dubbed into English and features a prologue by Charles Boyer was released by Alpha Video on DVD .
