= I Loved a Soldier =

- Directed by: Henry Hathaway
- Written by: John van Druten; Grover Jones; Lajos Bíró; Alice De Soos; Melchior Lengyel
- Produced by: Benjamin Glazer; Ernst Lubitsch
- Starring: Marlene Dietrich; Charles Boyer; Walter Catlett; Lionel Stander; Margaret Sullavan
- Cinematography: Charles Lang
- Edited by: Unknown
- Music by: Unknown
- Distributed by: Paramount Pictures
- Running time: Unknown
- Country: United States
- Language: English

I Loved a Soldier (also known as Invitation to Happiness) is an unfinished 1936 American romantic-comedy-drama film directed by Henry Hathaway and produced by Paramount Pictures. It stars Marlene Dietrich, Charles Boyer, Walter Catlett, Lionel Stander, and Margaret Sullavan.

The Paramount picture was intended to be a remake of Pola Negri's 1927 Hotel Imperial, which was based on a play by Lajos Bíró. Film shooting began in early January 1936 where the film was officially named Invitation to Happiness. Early on into the shooting, there was an accident with a gun that injured one of the crew members and almost hit Boyer, singeing his toupée. That same day, the movie's title was changed to I Loved a Soldier for unknown reasons.

As a result of problems with the script and on-set altercations between Dietrich and Hathaway, producer Ernst Lubitsch suspended production on the film several weeks into shooting. In March, Paramount announced that they and Dietrich were "amicable and friendly" again, and production of the film would continue with Margaret Sullavan as Dietrich's replacement. Recast with new actors, the film was completed in 1939 under the title Hotel Imperial. No footage shot for I Loved a Soldier was used in the final film, and no footage of I Loved a Soldier is known to have survived.

== Plot ==
The film tells the story of a young servant girl who works at Hotel Imperial. One day, she falls in love with a known customer who turns out be a soldier, locally known as the ultimate ladies man.

== Cast ==
- Marlene Dietrich
- Charles Boyer
- Walter Catlett
- Lionel Stander
- Margaret Sullavan
- Akim Tamiroff

== See also ==
- The Witching Hour
- The Shepherd of the Hills
- Now and Forever
