= Too Many Thieves =

- Directed by: Abner Biberman
- Written by: George Bellak
- Produced by: Richard Alan Simmons
- Starring: Peter Falk; Britt Ekland; Joanna Barnes
- Cinematography: Morris Hartzband
- Edited by: Armond Lebowitz
- Music by: Sid Ramin
- Production companies: Filmways; Mayo Productions
- Distributed by: Metro-Goldwyn-Mayer
- Release date: 1967
- Country: United States
- Language: English

Too Many Thieves is a 1967 American crime film directed by Abner Biberman and starring Peter Falk, Britt Ekland and Joanna Barnes.

The film is a re-edit of two episodes from the 1965 TV series The Trials of O'Brien.

== Premise ==
A gang of criminals steal a priceless Macedonian artifact from a museum.

== Cast ==
- Peter Falk as Danny
- Britt Ekland as Claudia
- Joanna Barnes as Katie
- Nehemiah Persoff as Georgi
- David Carradine as Felix
- George Coulouris as Andrew
- Elaine Stritch as Miss G
- Bill Anderson as David
- Ludwig Donath as Bulanerti
- Pierre Olaf as Petros

== See also ==
- List of American films of 1967
