= Lady from Chungking =

1942 film by William Nigh

- Theatrical release poster
- Directed by: William Nigh
- Written by: Milton Raison; Sam Robins
- Produced by: Arthur Alexander; Alfred Stern
- Starring: Anna May Wong
- Cinematography: Marcel Le Picard
- Edited by: Charles Henkel Jr.
- Music by: Lee Zahler
- Distributed by: Producers Releasing Corporation
- Release date: December 21, 1942
- Running time: 66 minutes
- Country: United States
- Language: English

Lady from Chungking is a 1942 American war film. Anna May Wong stars as the leader of a group of Chinese guerrillas who fight against the Japanese during World War II, and was produced as pro-Chinese propaganda.

== Plot ==
In World War II, Chinese guerrillas fight against the occupying Japanese forces. A young woman is the secret leader of the villagers, who plot to rescue two downed Flying Tigers pilots who are currently in the custody of the Japanese. The rescue mission takes on even more importance with the arrival of a Japanese general, which signals a major offensive taking place in the area.

== Cast ==
- Anna May Wong as Kwan Mei
- Harold Huber as General Kaimura
- Mae Clarke as Lavara
- Rick Vallin as Rodney Carr
- Paul Bryar as Pat O'Rourke
- Ted Hecht as Lieutenant Shimoto
- Ludwig Donath as Hans Gruber
- James B. Leong as Chen
- Archie Got as Mochow
- Walter Soo Hoo as Lu-Chi

== Reception ==
On the review aggregator website Rotten Tomatoes, 80% of 10 critics' reviews are positive.

== Home media ==
Alpha Video released the film on region-1 DVD on May 31, 2005.
