= Richard Alan Simmons =

American screenwriter

Richard Alan Simmons (October 11, 1924 – November 13, 2004) was a Canadian-American screenwriter.

Simmons was born in Toronto, Ontario, Canada, and served in the Royal Canadian Air Force during World War II. After the war, he graduated from the University of Toronto and then moved to California for a job with NBC radio, writing news and radio dramas. He moved into movies.

He wrote the 1961 TV script for "The Price of Tomatoes" episode on "The Dick Powell Show", which was nominated for a writing Emmy and won an Emmy for star Peter Falk.

He had a wife, Emily, to whom he was married for 53 years. At the time of his death, he had three children, and three grandchildren.

== Select credits ==
- The Lady Wants Mink (1953)
- War Paint (1953)
- Beachhead (1954)
- The Yellow Tomahawk (1954)
- Shield for Murder (1954)
- Three Hours to Kill (1954)
- Bengal Brigade (1954)
- The Looters (1955)
- The Private War of Major Benson (1955)
- Female on the Beach (1955)
- Congo Crossing (1956)
- The King and Four Queens (1956)
- Istanbul (1957)
- The Fuzzy Pink Nightgown (1957)
- Outlaw's Son (1957)
- Tarawa Beachhead (1958)
- The Trap (1959)
- The Dick Powell Show
- Della (1964)
- The Art of Love (1965)
- The Trials of O'Brien
- Fear No Evil (1969)
- Ritual of Evil (1970)
- Hitched (1971)
- Lock, Stock and Barrel (1971)
- Banyon (1971)
- Skin Game (1971) - story
- Columbo
- Juggernaut (1974)
- The Lives of Jenny Dolan (1975)
- Mrs. Columbo (1979–80) - creator
- Harry's Hong Kong (1987)
