= To Die in Paris =

- Written by: Brad Radnitz; Paul Mason
- Directed by: Charles S. Dubin; Allen Reisner
- Starring: Louis Jourdan; Kurt Kreuger; Phillippe Fourquet; Stuart Nesbet
- Country of origin: United States
- Original language: English

Original release
- Release: 1968

To Die in Paris is a 1968 TV film directed by Charles S. Dubin and Allen Reisner and starring Louis Jourdan, Kurt Kreuger, Phillippe Fourquet, and Stuart Nesbet.

== Premise ==
During World War Two, a French resistance leader is accused of betraying his own side.
