= Hitched (1971 film) =

1971 TV film

- Genre: Comedy; Western
- Written by: Richard Alan Simmons
- Directed by: Boris Sagal
- Starring: Sally Field; Tim Matheson; Neville Brand; Slim Pickens
- Music by: Patrick Williams
- Country of origin: United States
- Original language: English

Production
- Producer: Richard Alan Simmons
- Cinematography: Gerald Perry Finnerman
- Editor: Frank Morriss
- Running time: 74 minutes
- Production company: Universal Television

Original release
- Network: NBC
- Release: March 31, 1971

Hitched is a 1971 American comedy Western made-for-TV movie. The film was directed by Boris Sagal and stars Sally Field, Tim Matheson, Neville Brand, and Slim Pickens.

John Fiedler, Denver Pyle, John McLiam, Kathleen Freeman, Don Knight, Bo Svenson, Bill Zuckert, and Charles Lane had supporting roles. The film was a sequel to Lock, Stock, and Barrel.

== Plot ==
A young married couple struggles in the new west.

== Cast ==
- Sally Field as Roselle Bridgeman
- Tim Matheson as Clare Bridgeman
- Neville Brand} as Banjo Reilly
- Slim Pickens as Sam / Bart Dawson
- John Fiedler as Henry
- Denver Pyle as Ben Barnstable
- John McLiam as Pete Hunter
- Kathleen Freeman as Rainbow McCloud
- Don Knight as Reese
- Bo Svenson as Jay Appleby
- Bill Zuckert as Milgram
- Charles Lane as Round Tree
- Luana Anders as Emily
- John Anderson as Jomer Cruett
- Robert Ball as Mayor
- John Davis Chandler as Jannis
- Robert Deman as Deer Foot
- Sid Haig as Comstock
- Henry Jones as Barnstable
- Robert Karnes as Sheriff
- Larry D. Mann as Governor

== Production ==
Patrick Williams composed the music for Hitched. The film was written by Richard Alan Simmons.
