= L'hippopotamours =

- Directed by: Christian Fuin
- Written by: Christian Fuin; Philippe Khorsand
- Starring: Louis Jourdan
- Music by: Raymond Le Sénéchal
- Release date: 1976
- Country: France
- Language: French

L'hippopotamours is a 1976 French film. The plot follows three women who escape from a psychiatric facility and cause mayhem.
