= Charles Boyer =

French-American actor (1899–1978)

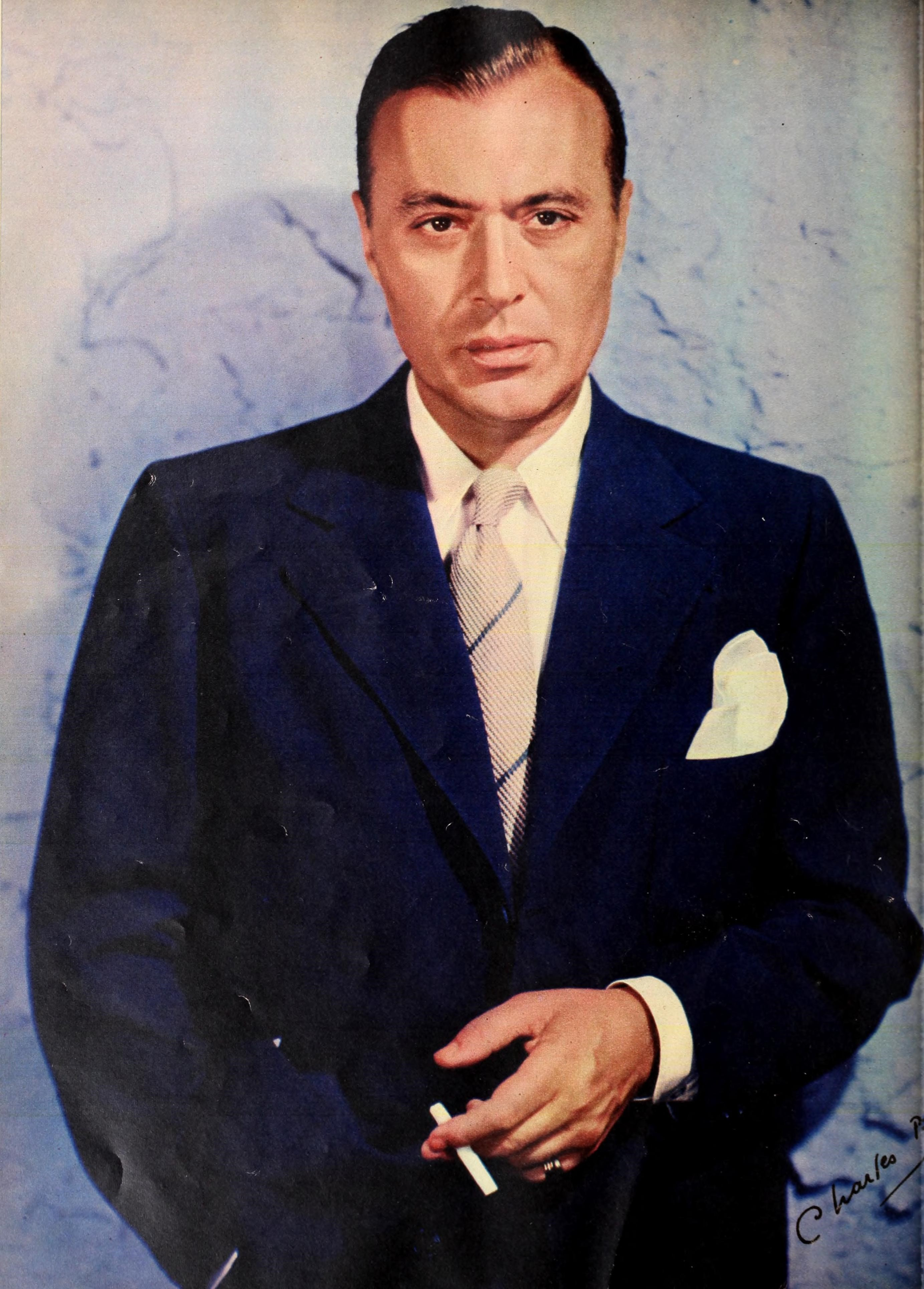
- Boyer in 1942
- Born: 28 August 1899; Figeac, France
- Died: 26 August 1978 (aged 78); Phoenix, Arizona, U.S.
- Burial place: Holy Cross Cemetery, Culver City, California, U.S.
- Education: Sorbonne
- Occupation: Actor
- Years active: 1920–1976
- Known for: The Garden of Allah; Algiers; Love Affair; Liliom; Gaslight
- Spouse: Pat Paterson (m. 1934; died 1978)
- Children: 1
- Awards: Academy Honorary Award (1943)

Charles Boyer (French: [ʃaʁl bwaje]; 28 August 1899 – 26 August 1978) was a French-American actor who appeared in more than 80 films between 1920 and 1976. After receiving an education in drama, Boyer started on the stage, but he found his success in American films during the 1930s. His memorable performances were among the era's most highly praised, in romantic dramas such as The Garden of Allah (1936), Algiers (1938), and Love Affair (1939), as well as the mystery-thriller Gaslight (1944). He received four Oscar nominations for Best Actor. He also appeared as himself on the CBS sitcom I Love Lucy.

== Life and career ==
=== Early years ===
Boyer was born in Figeac, Lot, France, the son of Augustine Louise Durand and Maurice Boyer, a merchant. Boyer was a shy small-town boy who discovered the movies and theatre at the age of eleven.

=== Early acting career ===
Boyer performed comic sketches for soldiers while working as a hospital orderly during World War I. He began studies briefly at the Sorbonne, and was waiting for a chance to study acting at the Paris Conservatory.

He went to the capital city to finish his education, but spent most of his time pursuing a theatrical career. In 1920, his quick memory won him a chance to replace the leading man in a stage production, Aux jardins de Murcie. He was successful. Then he appeared in a play La Bataille and Boyer became a theatre star overnight.

In the 1920s, he played charming and charismatic characters on both stage and in silent films.

=== Early French films ===
Boyer's first film was L'homme du large (1920), directed by Marcel L'Herbier. He had roles in Chantelouve (1921), Le grillon du foyer (1922), and Esclave (1922). At first, he performed film roles only for the money and found that supporting roles were unsatisfying. However, with the coming of sound, his deep voice made him a romantic star. Boyer focused on theatre work for a number of years. He returned to the screen with Infernal Circle (1928), Captain Fracasse (1929), and La barcarolle d'amour (1930).

=== Early trips to Hollywood ===
Boyer was first brought to Hollywood by MGM who wanted him to play the Chester Morris part in a French version of The Big House (1930), Révolte dans la prison (1931). Boyer had an offer from Paramount to appear in a small role in The Magnificent Lie (1931) with Ruth Chatterton, directed by Berthold Viertel. It was his first English speaking role. He went back to MGM to make Le procès de Mary Dugan (1931), the French version of The Trial of Mary Dugan (1929). He was featured in Tumultes (1932) for director Robert Siodmak. Then he appeared in the English-language film The Man from Yesterday (1932) with Claudette Colbert at Paramount again directed by Viertel. He had a choice small role in Jean Harlow's Red-Headed Woman (1932) at MGM.

=== Return to France ===
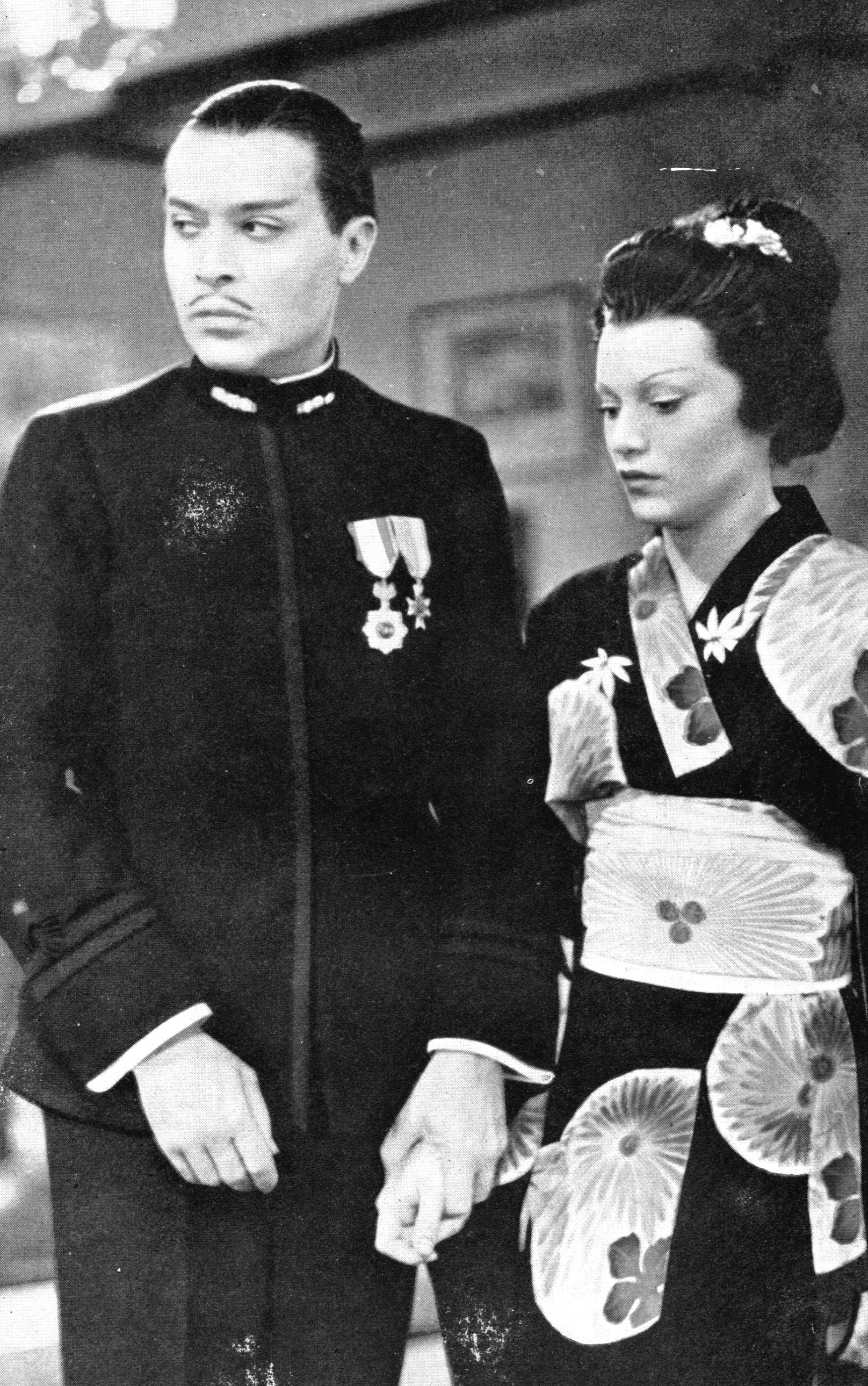
Boyer and Annabella in La bataille (1933)

Boyer went back to France where he starred in F.P.1 Doesn't Answer (1932), Moi et l'impératrice (1933), Les Amoureux (1933) (The Sparrowhawk), and La bataille (1933) with Annabella. The last was also filmed in an English-language version called The Battle, with Merle Oberon replacing Annabella and Boyer reprising his role. He appeared in The Only Girl (1933) with Lilian Harvey and performed on the Paris stage in Le Bonheur which was another success. It would be the last time he appeared on the Parisian stage.

He returned to Hollywood for Caravan (1934) with Loretta Young at Fox. He was also in the French-language version Caravane, again with Annabella. Then in France he starred in Liliom (1934), directed by Fritz Lang, his first classic. Boyer starred in some English language movies: Thunder in the East (1934). In France, he was in Le bonheur (1934), reprising his stage performance for director Marcel L'Herbier.

=== Walter Wanger ===
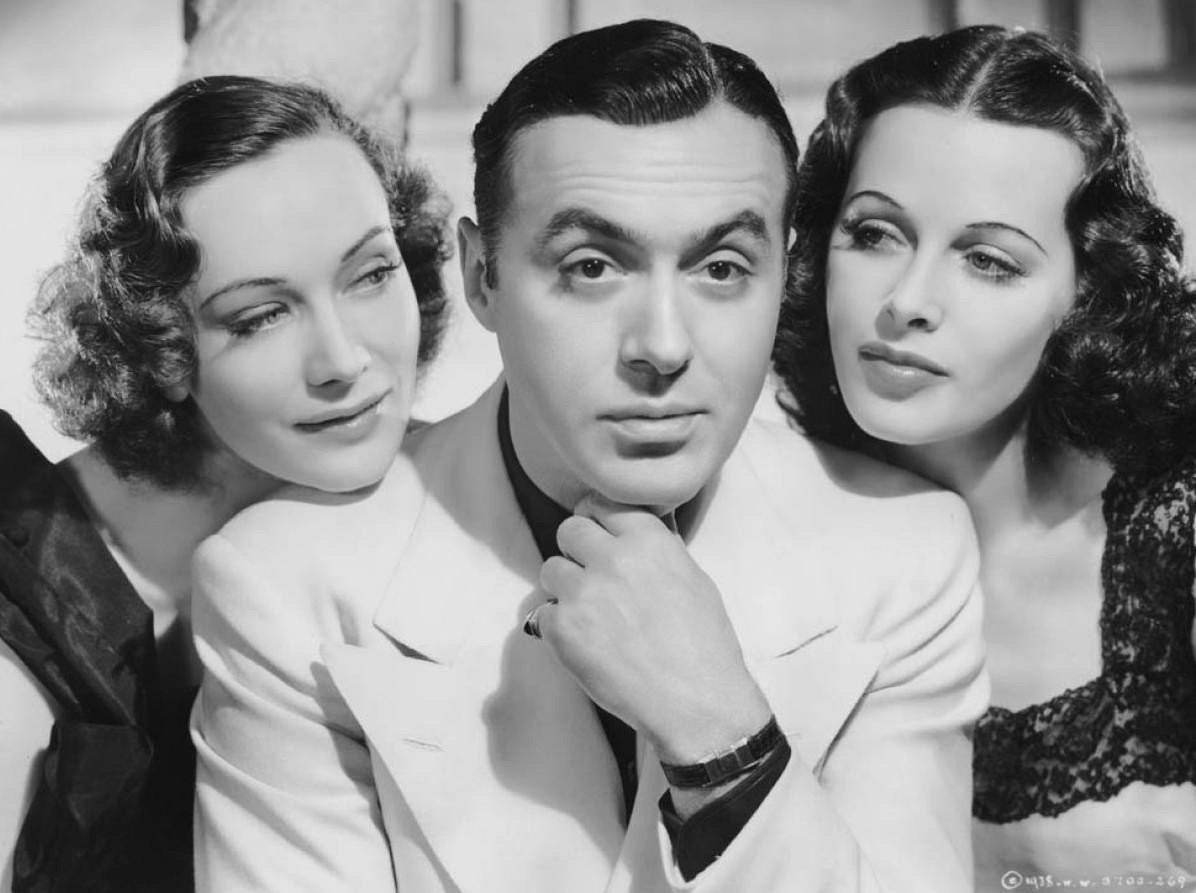
With Sigrid Gurie and Hedy Lamarr in Algiers (1938)

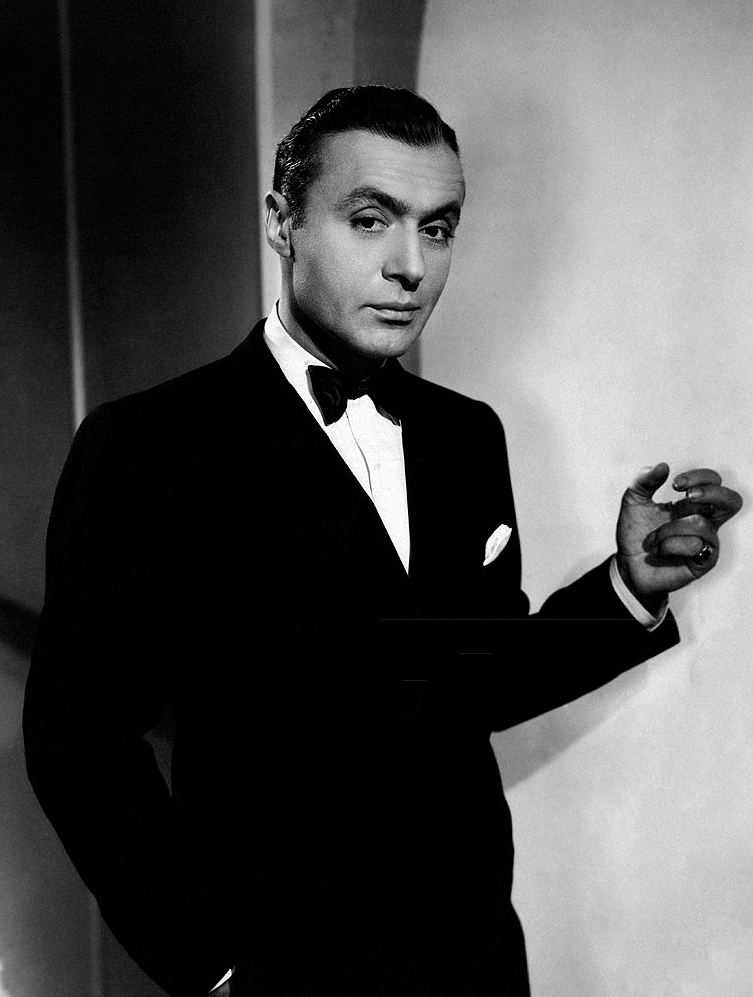
Boyer in Love Affair (1939)

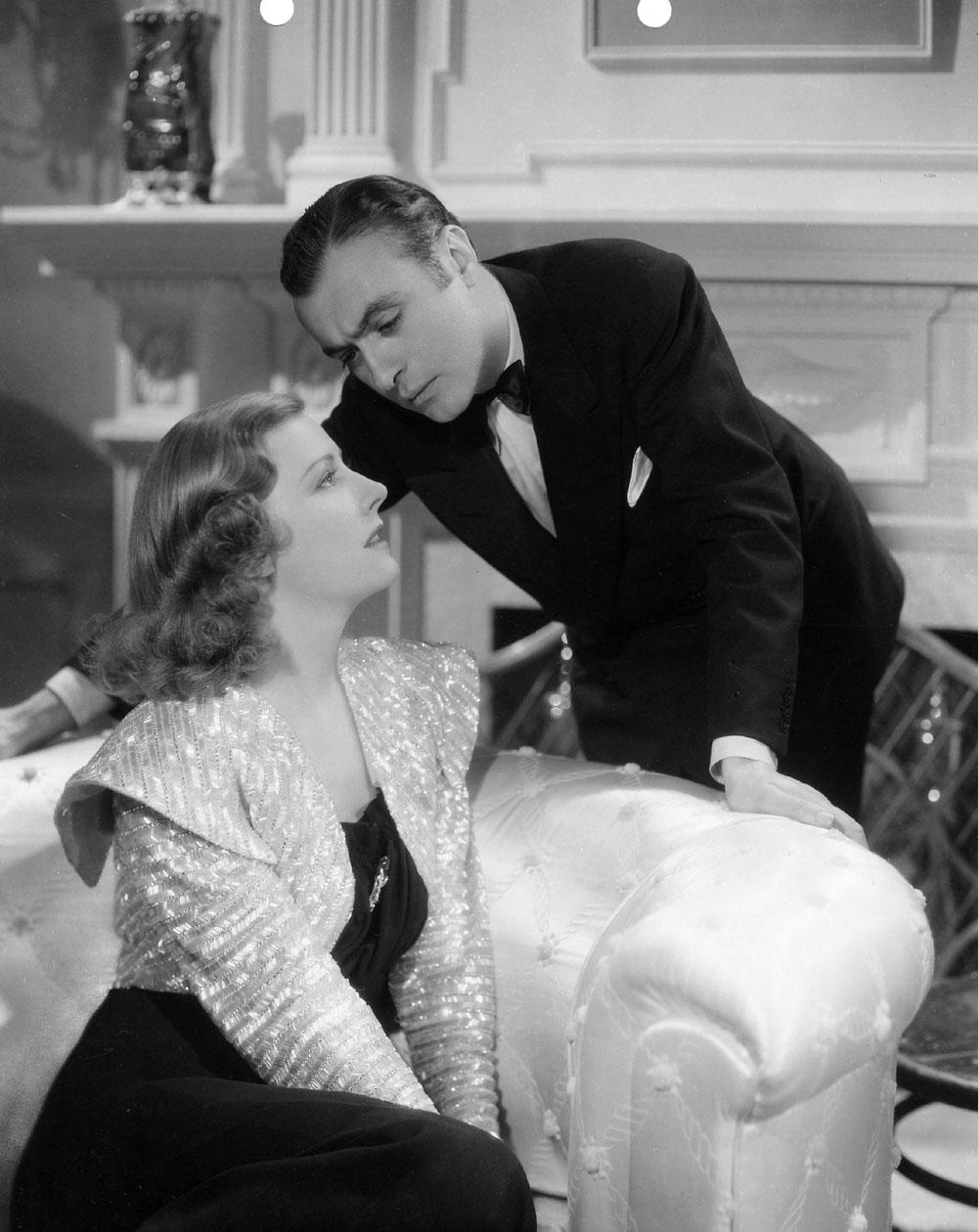
With Irene Dunne in Love Affair (1939)

Boyer co-starred with Claudette Colbert in the psychiatric drama Private Worlds (1935) for Walter Wanger at Paramount. He signed a five-year contract with Wanger. Then he romanced Katharine Hepburn in Break of Hearts (1935) for RKO, and Loretta Young in Shanghai (1935) for Wanger. Boyer became an international star with Mayerling (1936), co-starring Danielle Darrieux and directed by Anatole Litvak. Boyer played Rudolf, Crown Prince of Austria. Back in Hollywood he was teamed with Marlene Dietrich in The Garden of Allah (1936) for David O. Selznick. He and Dietrich were reunited on I Loved a Soldier (1936) for director Henry Hathaway at Paramount but the film was abandoned.

Boyer paired with Jean Arthur in History Is Made at Night (1937) for Wanger, and Greta Garbo in Conquest (1937) at MGM (where he played Napoleon Bonaparte). Boyer's fee for the latter was $150,000 but with all the re-takes he wound up earning $450,000. Boyer returned to France briefly to make Orage (1938), opposite Michèle Morgan for director Marc Allégret. Back in Hollywood, he had the lead in Tovarich (1937) with Colbert, directed by Litvak.

In 1938, he landed his famous role as Pepe le Moko, the thief on the run in Algiers, an English-language remake of the classic French film Pepe le Moko with Jean Gabin, produced by Wanger. Although in the movie Boyer never said to costar Hedy Lamarr "Come with me to the Casbah," this line was in the movie trailer. The line would stick with him, thanks to generations of impressionists and Looney Tunes parodies. Boyer's role as Pepe Le Moko was already world-famous when animator Chuck Jones based the character of Pepé Le Pew, the romantic skunk introduced in 1945, on Boyer and his best-known performance. Boyer's vocal style was also parodied on the Tom and Jerry cartoons, most notably when Tom Cat was trying to woo a female cat. (See The Zoot Cat).

Boyer made three films with Irene Dunne: Love Affair (1939) at RKO, When Tomorrow Comes (1939) at Universal and Together Again (1944) at Columbia.

=== World War II ===
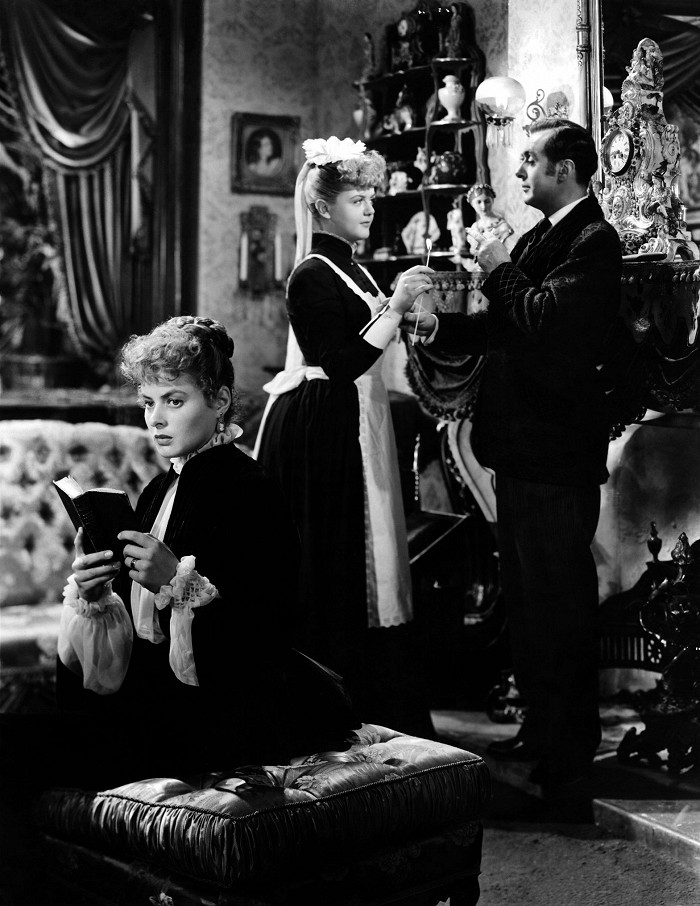
Ingrid Bergman, Angela Lansbury and Boyer in Gaslight (1944)

He went back to France to make Le corsaire (1939) for Marc Allégret. He was making the movie in Nice when France declared war on Germany in September 1939. Production ceased on the declaration of war. Boyer joined the French army. The film was never completed, although some footage of it was later released.

By November, Boyer was discharged from the army and back in Hollywood as the French government thought he would be of more service making films.

Boyer played in three classic film love stories: All This, and Heaven Too (1940) with Bette Davis, directed by Litvak at Warners; as the ruthless cad in Back Street (1941) with Margaret Sullavan, at Universal; and Hold Back the Dawn (1941) with Olivia de Havilland and Paulette Goddard, at Paramount.

In contrast to his glamorous image, Boyer began losing his hair early, had a pronounced paunch, and was noticeably shorter than leading ladies like Ingrid Bergman. When Bette Davis first saw him on the set of All This, and Heaven Too, she did not recognize him and tried to have him removed.

=== Universal ===
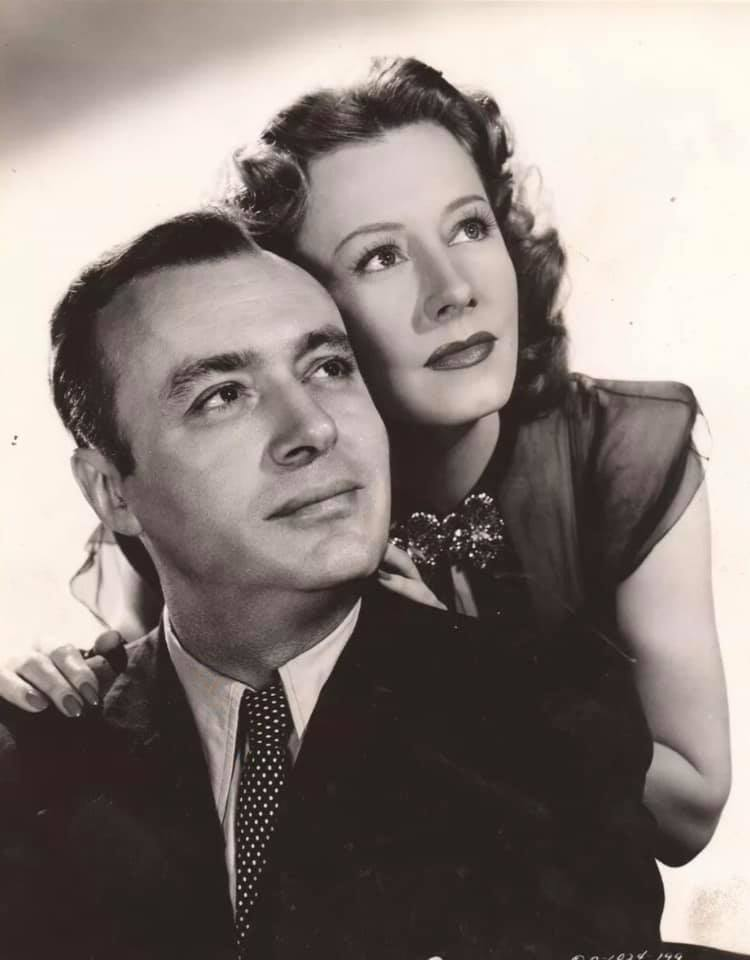
Boyer and Irene Dunne in Together Again (1944)

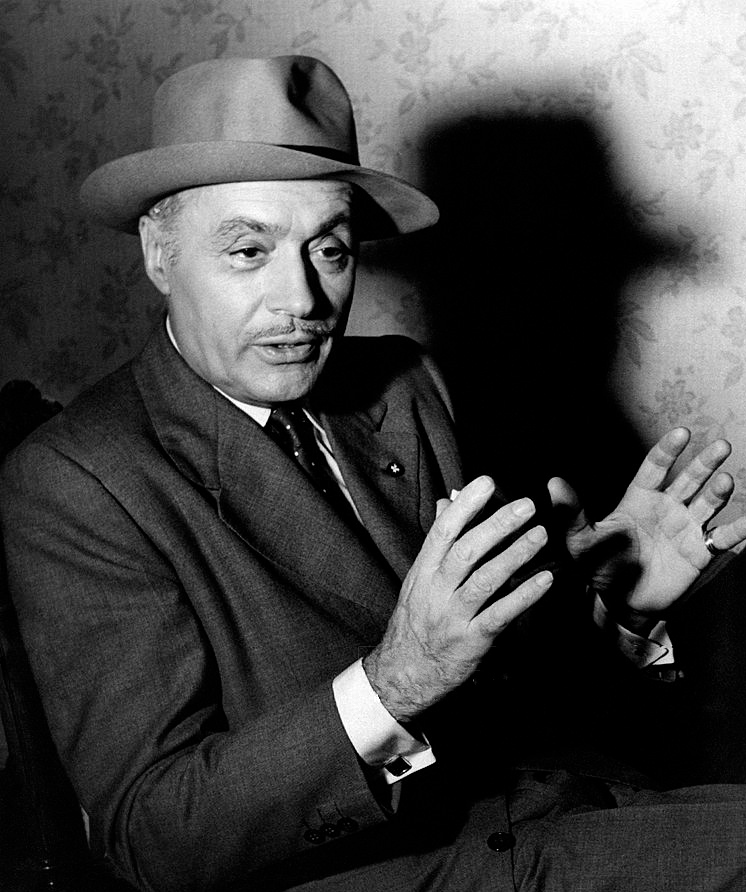
Charles Boyer in 1955

In January 1942, Boyer signed a three-year contract with Universal to act and produce. The contract would cover nine films. Before he started the contract he finished a film at Warners, The Constant Nymph (1943) with Joan Fontaine.

Boyer was reunited with Sullavan in Appointment for Love (1942) at Universal and was one of many stars in Tales of Manhattan (1942), directed by Julien Duvivier and Immortal France (1942). He became a US citizen in 1942. He was one of many stars in Flesh and Fantasy (1943) which he also produced with Julien Duvivier at Universal. He was an uncredited producer on Duvivier's Destiny (1944). In 1943, he was awarded an Honorary Oscar Certificate for "progressive cultural achievement" in establishing the French Research Foundation in Los Angeles as a source of reference (certificate).

Boyer had one of his biggest hits with Gaslight (1944) with Ingrid Bergman and Joseph Cotten. He followed it with Together Again (1944) re-uniting with Irene Dunne; Congo (1944), a short; and Confidential Agent (1945) with Lauren Bacall, at Warners.

Boyer began his post war career with Cluny Brown (1946) with Jennifer Jones directed by Ernst Lubitsch. He was Warners highest paid actor at this stage earning $205,000 in 1945. In 1947, he was the voice of Capt. Daniel Gregg in the Lux Radio Theater's presentation of The Ghost and Mrs. Muir, played in the film by Rex Harrison. In 1948, he was made a chevalier of the French Légion d'honneur. That year he did a thriller A Woman's Vengeance (1948).

Another film he did with Bergman, Arch of Triumph (1948), failed at the box office and Boyer was no longer the box office star he had been. "If you are in a big flop, nobody wants you," he said later.

=== Broadway ===
Boyer went to Broadway, where he made his first appearance in Red Gloves (1948–49), based on Dirty Hands by Jean-Paul Sartre, which went for 113 performances.

In 1951, he appeared on the Broadway stage in one of his most notable roles, that of Don Juan, in a dramatic reading of the third act of George Bernard Shaw's Man and Superman. This is the act popularly known as Don Juan in Hell. In 1952, he won Broadway's 1951 Special Tony Award for Don Juan in Hell. It was directed by actor Charles Laughton. Laughton co-starred as the Devil, with Cedric Hardwicke as the statue of the military commander slain by Don Juan, and Agnes Moorehead as Dona Anna, the commander's daughter, one of Juan's former conquests. The production was a critical success, and was subsequently recorded complete by Columbia Masterworks, one of the first complete recordings of a non-musical stage production ever made. As of 2006, however, it has never been released on CD, but in 2009 it became available as an MP3 download.

Boyer did not abandon cinema: he had leading roles in The 13th Letter (1951), The First Legion (1952), and The Happy Time (1952). He had a character role in Thunder in the East (filmed 1951, released 1953) an Alan Ladd film.

=== Four Star Playhouse ===
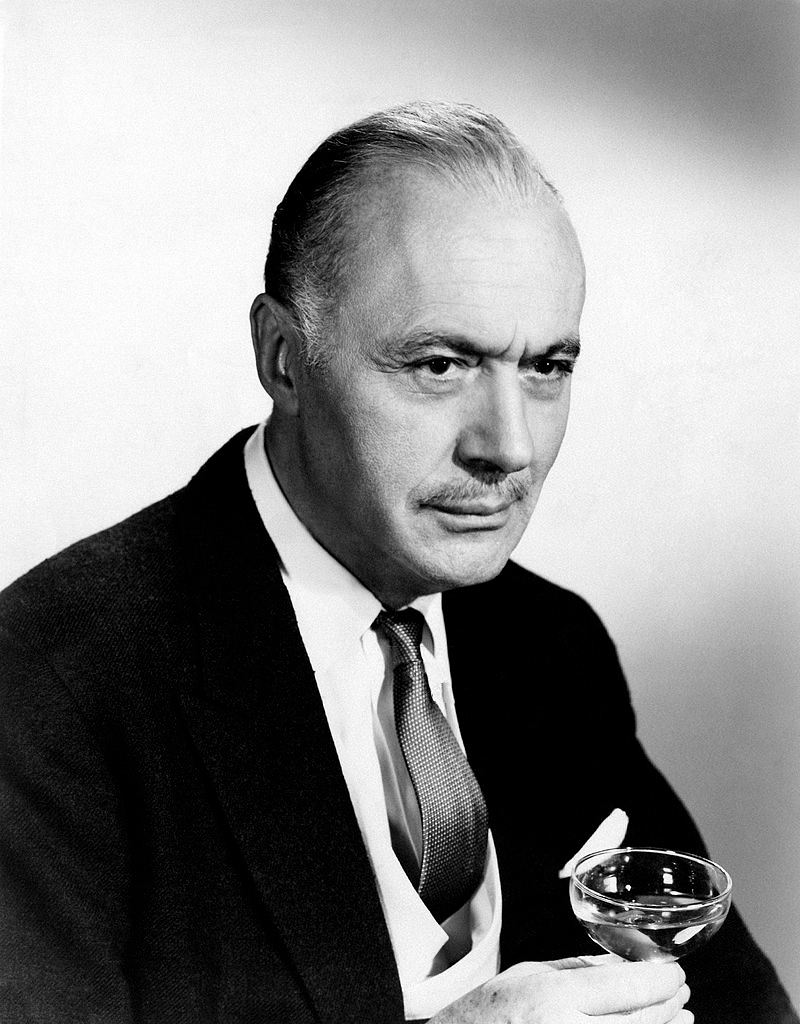
Boyer in 1962

Boyer moved into television as one of the pioneering producers and stars of the anthology show Four Star Playhouse (1952–56). It was made by Four Star Productions which would make Boyer and partners David Niven and Dick Powell rich.

Boyer returned to France to star in The Earrings of Madame de... (1953) for Max Ophüls alongside Darrieux. While there he was one of many names in Boum sur Paris (1953).

He returned to Broadway for Norman Krasna's Kind Sir (1953–54) directed by Joshua Logan which ran for 166 performances. (In the film version, Indiscreet (1958), Cary Grant was cast in Boyer's role.) Back in Hollywood, Boyer had a supporting role in MGM's The Cobweb (1955). He went back to France to star in Nana (1955) with Martine Carol and then to Italy for What a Woman! (1956) with Sophia Loren. In 1956, Boyer was a guest star on I Love Lucy and had a cameo in Around the World in 80 Days (1956). In France he had the lead in Paris, Palace Hotel (1956).

He appeared as the mystery guest on the 10 March 1957 episode of What's My Line? On 17 March 1957, Boyer starred in an adaptation for TV of the Pulitzer Prize-winning play, There Shall Be No Night, by Robert E. Sherwood. The performance starred Katharine Cornell, and was broadcast on NBC as part of the Hallmark Hall of Fame. He appeared several times in Goodyear Theatre and Alcoa Theatre on TV.

In France, Boyer was one of several stars in It Happened on the 36 Candles (1957) and he co-starred with Brigitte Bardot in La Parisienne (1957) and Michele Morgan in Maxime (1958), the latter directed by Henri Verneuil.

In Hollywood Boyer had a strong supporting role as real life privateer Dominique You alongside Yul Brynner's Jean LaFitte in The Buccaneer (1958).

Boyer co-starred again with Claudette Colbert in the Broadway comedy The Marriage-Go-Round (1958–1960), but said to the producer, "Keep that woman away from me". The production was a hit and ran for 431 performances. Boyer did not reprise his performance in the film version. He kept busy doing work for Four Star.

=== 1960s ===
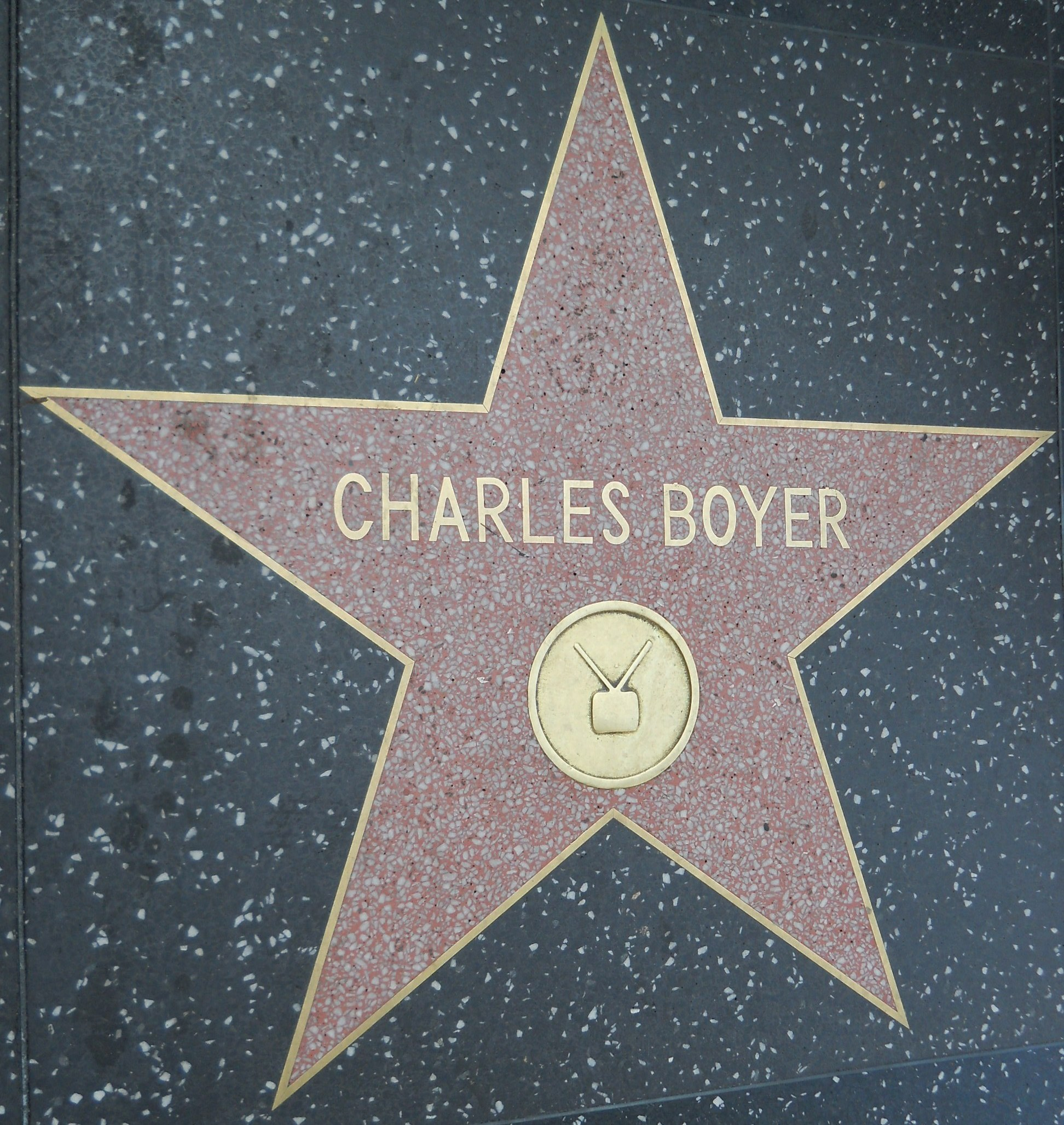
Star on the Hollywood Walk of Fame at 6300 Hollywood Blvd.

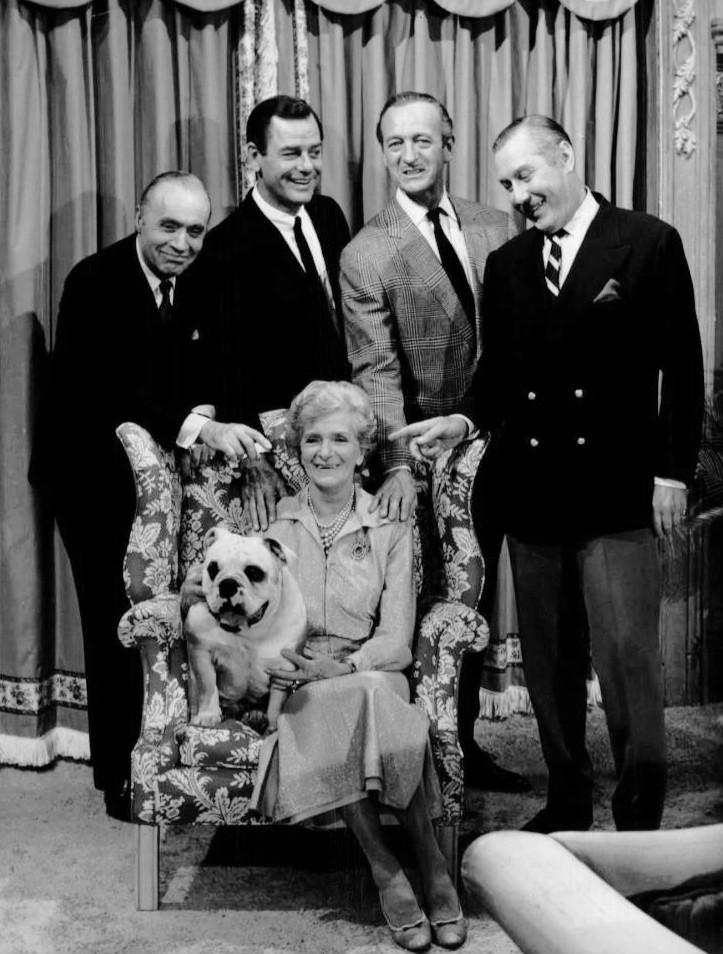
The cast of The Rogues (1964) with Boyer, Gig Young, David Niven, Robert Coote and Gladys Cooper

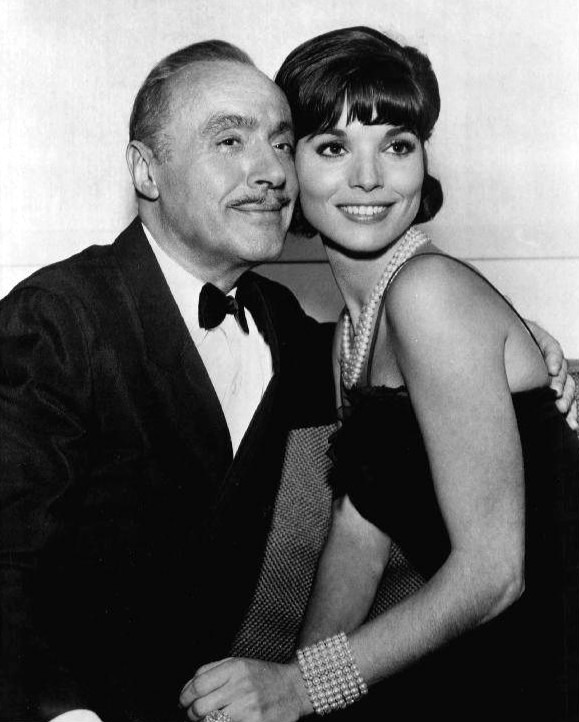
With Elsa Martinelli in The Rogues (1964)

Onscreen, he continued in older roles: in Fanny (1961) starring Leslie Caron; MGM's remake of The Four Horsemen of the Apocalypse (1962); Adorable Julia (1962) with Lilli Palmer; several episodes of The Dick Powell Theatre; and Love Is a Ball (1963).

He was nominated for the Tony Award as Best Actor (Dramatic) in the 1963 Broadway production of Lord Pengo, which ran for 175 performances. Later that same year Boyer performed in Man and Boy on the London and New York stage. The Broadway run only went for 54 performances.

Boyer was reunited with David Niven in The Rogues (1964–65), a television series also starring Gig Young. Niven, Boyer and Young revolved from week to week as the episode's leading man, sometimes appearing together, although most episodes wound up being helmed by Young since both Niven and Boyer had flourishing movie careers.

He had good supporting roles in A Very Special Favor (1965) with Rock Hudson; How to Steal a Million (1966) with Audrey Hepburn and Peter O'Toole; Barefoot in the Park (1967) with Robert Redford and Jane Fonda. He had cameos in Is Paris Burning? (1966) and Casino Royale (1967) and was top billed in The Day the Hot Line Got Hot (1968).

His career had lasted longer than that of other romantic actors, winning him the nickname "the last of the cinema's great lovers." He recorded a laid-back album called Where Does Love Go in 1966, it being a minor commercial success, peaking at No. 148 in the US. The album consisted of famous love songs sung (or rather spoken) with Boyer's distinctive deep voice and French accent. The record was reportedly Elvis Presley's favorite album for the last 11 years of his life, the one he most listened to.

Boyer supported in The April Fools (1969) and The Madwoman of Chaillot (1969) and guest starred on The Name of the Game.

=== 1970s ===
Boyer's son had died in 1965 and Boyer was finding it traumatic to continue living in Los Angeles so in March 1970 he decided to relocate to Europe.

Boyer's final credits included the musical remake of Lost Horizon (1973) and the French film Stavisky (1974), starring Jean-Paul Belmondo, the latter winning him the New York Film Critics Circle Award for Best Supporting Actor, and also received the Special Tribute at Cannes Film Festival.

Boyer's final performance was in A Matter of Time (1976) with Liza Minnelli and Ingrid Bergman, directed by Vincente Minnelli.

== Radio ==
Boyer was the star of Hollywood Playhouse on NBC in the 1930s, but he left in 1939 "for war service in France," returning on the 3 January 1940, broadcast. When he went on vacation in the summer of 1940, an item in a trade publication reported: "It is an open secret that he doesn't like the present policy of a different story and characters each week. Boyer would prefer a program in which he could develop a permanent characterization." Boyer would later star in his own radio show entitled Presenting Charles Boyer during 1950 over NBC.

== Personal life ==
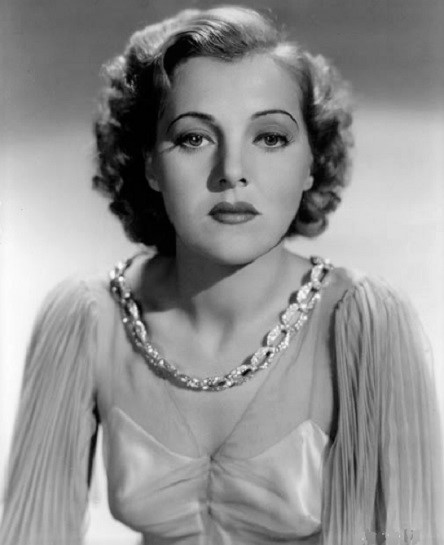
Boyer's wife Pat Paterson

Boyer became a naturalized citizen of the United States on 15 June 1942, in Los Angeles. In addition to French and English, Boyer spoke Italian, German, and Spanish.

Boyer married British actress Pat Paterson, whom he met at a dinner party in 1934. The two became engaged after two weeks of courtship and were married three months later. Later, they moved from Hollywood to Paradise Valley, Arizona. The marriage lasted 44 years until her death. The couple's only child, Michael Charles Boyer (9 December 1943 – 23 September 1965), died by suicide at age 21, after separating from his girlfriend.

== Death ==
On 26 August 1978, Boyer died by suicide, aged 78, from an overdose of Seconal while at a friend's home in Scottsdale, Arizona. He was taken to the hospital in Phoenix, Arizona, where he died, two days after his wife's death from cancer. He was interred in Holy Cross Cemetery, Culver City, California, alongside his wife and son.

== Awards ==
Boyer never won an Oscar, though he was nominated for Best Actor four times in Conquest (1937), Algiers (1938), Gaslight (1944) and Fanny (1961), the latter also winning him a nomination for the Laurel Awards for Top Male Dramatic Performance. He is particularly well known for Gaslight in which he played a thief/murderer who tries to convince his newlywed wife that she is going insane.

He was nominated for the Golden Globe as Best Actor for the 1952 film The Happy Time; and also nominated for the Emmy for Best Continuing Performance by an Actor in a Dramatic Series for his work in Four Star Playhouse (1952–1956).

In 1952, he received the Special Tony Award for his performance in Don Juan in Hell.

In 1960, Boyer was inducted into the Hollywood Walk of Fame with a motion pictures star and a television star. Both stars are located at 6300 Hollywood Boulevard.

== Filmography ==
=== Features ===
Year	Title	Role	Notes
1920	L'Homme du large	Guenn la Taupe – le mauvais génie de Michel	
1921	Chantelouve	Roger de Thièvres	
1922	Le Grillon du foyer	Edouard Caleb	
1922	Esclave	Claude Laporte	
1928	Infernal Circle		
1929	Captain Fracasse	Duc de Vallombreuse	
1930	La Barcarolle d'amour	Andre le Kerdec	
1930	Revolt in the Prison	Fred Morgan	
1931	The Magnificent Lie	Jacques	
1931	Le Procès de Mary Dugan	Le procureur	
1932	Tumultes	Ralph Schwarz	
1932	The Man from Yesterday	Rene Gaudin	
1932	Red-Headed Woman	Albert	
1933	La Bataille	Le marquis Yorisaka	
1933	The Only Girl	The Duke	
1933	I.F.1 ne répond plus	Ellisen	
1933	The Empress and I		
1933	L'Épervier	Comte Georges de Dasetta	
1933	F.P.1 Doesn't Answer		
1934	The Battle	Marquis Yorisaka	
1934	Liliom	Liliom Zadowski	
1934	Caravan	Latzi	
1934	Le Bonheur	Philippe Lutcher	
1935	Private Worlds	Dr. Charles Monet	
1935	Break of Hearts	Franz Roberti	
1935	Shanghai	Dimitri Koslov	
1936	Mayerling	L'archiduc Rodolphe	
1936	The Garden of Allah	Boris Androvsky	
1936	I Loved a Soldier	Leutnant Baron Almasy	Unfinished film
1937	History Is Made at Night	Paul Dumond	
1937	Conquest	Emperor Napoleon Bonaparte	
1937	Tovarich	Prince Mikail Alexandrovitch Ouratieff	
1938	Orage	André Pascaud	
1938	Algiers	Pepe le Moko	
1939	Love Affair	Michel	
1939	When Tomorrow Comes	Philip Chagal	
1939	Le Corsaire		Unfinished film
1940	All This, and Heaven Too	Duc de Praslin	
1941	Back Street	Walter Saxel	
1941	Hold Back the Dawn	Georges Iscovescu	
1941	Appointment for Love	Andre 'Pappy' Cassil	
1942	Tales of Manhattan	Paul Orman	
1943	Flesh and Fantasy	Paul Gaspar	Episode 3
1943	The Heart of a Nation	Introductory Narrator	US version only
1943	The Constant Nymph	Lewis Dodd	
1944	Gaslight	Gregory Anton	
1944	Together Again	George Corday	
1944	The Fighting Lady	Narrator	French version only
1945	Confidential Agent	Luis Denard	
1946	The Battle of the Rails	Narrator	voice, uncredited
1946	Cluny Brown	Adam Belinski	
1948	A Woman's Vengeance	Henry Maurier	
1948	Arch of Triumph	Dr. Ravic	
1951	The 13th Letter	Dr. Paul Laurent	
1951	The First Legion	Father Marc Arnoux	
1952	The Happy Time	Jacques Bonnard	
1952	Thunder in the East	Prime Minister Singh	
1953	The Earrings of Madame de...	Général André de...	
1953	Boum sur Paris	Himself	
1955	The Cobweb	Dr. Douglas N. Devanal	
1955	Nana	Comte Muffat	
1956	Lucky to Be a Woman	Count Gregorio Sennetti	
1956	Around the World in 80 Days	Monsieur Gasse, balloonist	
1956	Paris, Palace Hotel	Henri Delormel	
1957	It Happened on the 36 Candles	Himself	Uncredited
1957	La Parisienne	Le prince Charles	
1958	Maxime	Maxime Cherpray	
1958	The Buccaneer	Dominique You	
1961	Fanny	Cesar	
1962	Midnight Folly	Pierre	
1962	The Four Horsemen of the Apocalypse	Marcelo Desnoyers	
1962	Adorable Julia	Michael Grosselyn	
1963	Love Is a Ball	M. Etienne Pimm	
1965	A Very Special Favor	Michel Boullard	
1966	How to Steal a Million	DeSolnay	
1966	Is Paris Burning?	Docteur Monod	
1967	Casino Royale	Le Grand	
1967	Barefoot in the Park	Victor Velasco	
1968	Hot Line	Vostov	
1969	The April Fools	Andre Greenlaw	
1969	The Madwoman of Chaillot	The Broker	
1973	Lost Horizon	The High Lama	
1974	Stavisky	Le baron Jean Raoul	
1976	A Matter of Time	Count Sanziani	Final film role

=== Short subjects ===
- The Candid Camera Story (Very Candid) of the Metro-Goldwyn-Mayer Pictures 1937 Convention (1937) as himself (uncredited)
- Hollywood Goes to Town (1938) as himself
- Les îles de la liberté (1943) as narrator
- Congo (1945) as voice
- On Stage! (1949) as himself
- 1955 Motion Picture Theatre Celebration (1955) as himself (uncredited)

=== Television ===
- Four Star Playhouse (29 episodes, 1952–1956) as Various characters
- Toast of the Town (2 episodes, 1953) as himself
- Charles Boyer Theater (1953) as himself / host
- The Jackie Gleason Show (1 episode, 1953) as himself
- I Love Lucy (1 episode, 1956) as himself
- Climax! (1 episode, 1956) as himself
- Hallmark Hall of Fame (1 episode, 1957)
- Playhouse 90 (1 episode, 1957) as himself
- A Private Little Party for a Few Chums (1957) as himself
- Goodyear Theatre (unknown episodes, 1957–1958) as Alternate Lead Player (1957–1958)
- Alcoa Theatre (3 episodes, 1957–1958) as man / Lemerrier / Dr. Jacques Roland
- What's My Line? (4 episodes, 1957–1958, 1962–1963) as himself – Mystery Guest
- The Dinah Shore Chevy Show (1 episode, 1960) as himself
- The Dick Powell Show (4 episodes, 1962–1963) as Carlos Morell / Andreas
- A Golden Prison: The Louvre (1964, presenter) as narrator
- The Rogues (8 episodes, 1964–1965) as Marcel St. Clair
- The Bell Telephone Hour (1 episode, 1966) as himself
- The Name of the Game (1 episode, 1969) as Henri Jarnoux
- Film '72 (1 episode, 1976) as himself

== Broadway ==
- Red Gloves (1948–1949)
- Don Juan in Hell (1951–1952)
- Kind Sir (1953–1954)
- The Marriage-Go-Round (1958–1960)
- Lord Pengo (1962–1963)
- Man and Boy (1963)

== Award nominations ==
=== Academy Awards ===
Year	Category	Film	Result
1937	Best Actor	Conquest	Nominated
1938	Best Actor	Algiers	Nominated
1944	Best Actor	Gaslight	Nominated
1961	Best Actor	Fanny	Nominated

=== Golden Globe Awards ===
Year	Category	Film	Result
1953	Best Actor – Drama	The Happy Time	Nominated
