= Romance Theatre =

Romance Theatre is a 30-minute American anthology television series produced for first-run syndication by Courtship Productions. A total of 83 episodes aired from 1982–83. The show was hosted by Louis Jourdan.

Each story was written by a member of the Romance Writers of America Guild and consisted of five episodes.

Guest stars included Millie Perkins, Doris Roberts, Annie Potts, Janis Paige, Lyle Waggoner, and Chuck Woolery.

== Critical response ==
The book Syndicated Television: The First Forty Years, 1947-1987 suggested that one problem with Romance Theatre was, "the producers of the series made an inviolate promise to the viewers that each of the five-part stories would end happily, and what true soap-opera fan wanted to see that?"
