= Tumultes (1932 film) =

- Directed by: Robert Siodmak
- Written by: Robert Liebmann; Hans Müller
- Cinematography: Otto Baecker; Günther Rittau
- Music by: Friedrich Hollaender; Gérard Jacobson
- Release date: 1932
- Running time: 92 minutes
- Country: France
- Language: French

Tumultes is a 1932 French crime film directed by Robert Siodmak and starring Charles Boyer and Florelle. It was made at the Babelsberg Studio in Berlin and is a French-language version of Storms of Passion which was also directed by Siodmak, but with German actors.

== Cast ==
- Charles Boyer : Ralph Schwarz
- Florelle : Ania
- Clara Tambour : Yvonne
- Thomy Bourdelle : Gustave Krouchovski
- Robert Arnoux : Willi
- Marcel André : le commissaire
- Armand Bernard : le bègue
- Lucien Callamand : Max
- Marcel Vallée : Paul
- Louis Florencie : 'Emma' Emmerich
- Georges Deneubourg : un gardien de prison
- Noël Roquevert : un gardien de prison
- Marcel Merminod

== Reception ==
The film received a very positive retrospective review in Le Monde. Another review, also positive, recalls that Siodmak, one of the inventors of noir, probably shocked the 1930s audience with this pessimistic thriller. The film is also remembered for the songs it contains.
