= The Trials of O'Brien =

Television series (1965–1966)

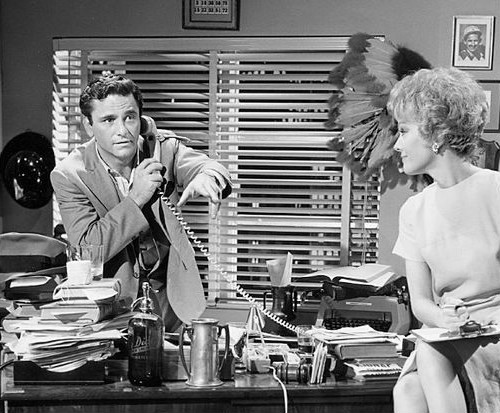
- Peter Falk and Joanna Barnes, 1965.
- Genre: Legal drama/comedy
- Created by: Gene Wang
- Developed by: Gene Wang
- Starring: Peter Falk; Elaine Stritch; Joanna Barnes
- Theme music composer: Sid Ramin
- Country of origin: United States
- Original language: English
- No. of seasons: 1
- No. of episodes: 22

Production
- Camera setup: Single-camera
- Running time: 48 mins.
- Production companies: Filmways; Mayo Productions, The O'Brien Company

Original release
- Network: CBS
- Release: September 18, 1965 – May 27, 1966

The Trials of O'Brien is a 1965 television series starring Peter Falk as sordid, Shakespeare-quoting lawyer Daniel J. "Danny" O'Brien, and featuring Elaine Stritch as his secretary "Miss G", and Joanna Barnes as his ex-wife Katie.

The series ran for 22 episodes on CBS Television between September 18, 1965 and March 18, 1966.

Among its guest stars: Milton Berle, Robert Blake, David Carradine, Faye Dunaway, Britt Ekland, Tammy Grimes, Buddy Hackett, Gene Hackman, Frank Langella, Angela Lansbury, Cloris Leachman, Roger Moore, Rita Moreno, Pierre Olaf, Estelle Parsons, Joanna Pettet, Brock Peters, Tony Roberts, and Martin Sheen.

== Episodes ==
No.	Title	Directed by	Written by	Original release date
1	"Over Defence Is Out"	Stuart Rosenberg	Richard Alan Simmons	September 18, 1965
O'Brien represents a client who was charged with murder after being released from prison. Guest star: Vincent Gardenia
2	"Bargain Day on the Street of Regret"	Bernard L. Kowalski	Irving Gaynor Neiman	September 25, 1965
After winning a boxer in a dice game, O'Brien must defend him when he is charged in a fatal stabbing. Guest stars: Herschel Bernardi and Robert Blake.
3	"Notes on a Spanish Prisoner"	Stuart Rosenberg	Harold Gast	October 2, 1965
A bunco artist (Buddy Hackett) is defended by O'Brien after he is conned out of money by his girlfriend.
4	"Never Bet on Anything That Talks"	Robert Gist	Robert van Scoyk	October 9, 1965
O'Brien's English bookie is charged in the death of an accountant, but the person who can clear him is nowhere to be found.
5	"What Can Go Wrong"	Lamont Johnson	Irving Gaynor Neiman	October 16, 1965
After discovering that a man is dating his ex-wife (Joanna Barnes), O'Brien delightedly sets him up as a "pigeon" in order to trap a killer. Guest stars: Roger Moore and Michael Constantine.
6	"Goodbye and Keep Cool"	James Sheldon	Gene Wang	October 23, 1965
A woman (Cloris Leachman) is accused of murdering her husband, and retains O'Brien to defend her. Guest star: Robert Loggia.
7	"A Gaggle of Girls"	Stuart Rosenberg	Robert J. Crean	October 30, 1965
O'Brien is retained by a Mother Superior in order to persuade the owner of an adjoining cafe to permit St. Anthony's Youth Center to use its garden.
8	"The Trouble with Archie"	Bernard L. Kowalski	George Bellak	November 6, 1965
O'Brien investigates the death of a partner in the Seventh Avenue Dress House where his ex-wife works. Guest stars: Lou Jacobi, Theodore Bikel, Simon Oakland and Alice Ghostley.
9	"How Do You Get to Carnegie Hall?"	Robert Gist	George Bellak	November 13, 1965
A "heist artist" who is accused of fatally stabbing a dealer of rare violins is defended by O'Brien. Guest stars: Norman Fell, Dana Elcar, Kurt Kasznar, Frank Langella, and former boxer Jake LaMotta.
10	"Charlie's Got All the Luck"	Tom Gries	Heywood Peters	November 20, 1965
While being bugged by his ex-wife to sign the lease on her luxurious apartment, O'Brien must defend a client involved in a fatal shooting that follows a fixed horse race. Guest stars: Martin Sheen, Tony Roberts, and Philip Bosco.
11	"Picture Me a Murder"	Lawrence Dobkin	George Bellak	November 27, 1965
O'Brien represents a movie producer (Alan Alda) who was charged with resisting arrest while filming an "underground" movie. Guest stars: Claude Akins, Charles Grodin, Jessica Walter, and Joanna Pettet.
12	"Dead End on Flugel Street"	Paul Bogart	Robert van Scoyk	December 3, 1965
A burlesque comedian (Milton Berle) is involved in murder when his straight man is killed after making advances on the comedian's wife.
13	"No Justice for the Judge"	Abner Biberman	David Ellis	December 10, 1965
An eccentric judge (Burgess Meredith) engages O'Brien to represent him on charges of mental disability that could remove him from the bench. Guest stars: Robert Emhardt, Barnard Hughes, and Ken Kercheval.
14	"Leave It to Me"	Paul Bogart	Philip H. Reisman Jr.	December 17, 1965
O'Brien tries to have a will declared invalid before three greedy heirs (Angela Lansbury, George Rose and Thayer David) kill each other in a house that's booby-trapped from cellar to attic.
15	"Alarums and Excursions"	Richard C. Sarafian	Robert J. Crean	January 7, 1966
A foster father (John McGiver), who is content to keep collecting welfare checks, hires O'Brien to keep seven children with him after an adoption judge takes the youths away from him.
16	"The 10-Foot, 6-Inch Pole"	Stuart Rosenberg	Don Mankiewicz	January 14, 1966
O'Brien charges that an assistant district attorney (Murray Hamilton) failed to prosecute a broker (Albert Paulsen) in the death of an accountant.
17	"A Horse Called Destiny"	Abner Biberman	Robert van Scoyk	January 21, 1966
O'Brien represents a spiritualist in the murder of a wealthy client whose death he has predicted.
18	"The Blue Steel Suite"	*	David Ellis	January 28, 1966
Held as a hostage in a jail break, O'Brien is asked to take a prisoner's complaints to the public.
19	"The Partridge Papers"	Lawrence Dobkin	George Bellak	February 4, 1966
O'Brien is forced to operate out of a hospital, after suffering a broken leg in a hit-and-run accident. Writer James Partridge, who was with him at the time of the accident, thinks the "accident" was meant for him, based on his work for British Intelligence.
20	"The Greatest Game: Part 1"	Abner Biberman	George Bellak	March 4, 1966
A Balkan girl (Britt Eklund) steals the Viktor Emblem, a jewel-encrusted egg from a national shrine, and O'Brien is retained to negotiate for its return.
21	"The Greatest Game: Part 2"	Abner Biberman	George Bellak	March 11, 1966
O'Brien's negotiations for the Viktor Emblem get more complicated when the person holding it has his life threatened. NOTE: This two part episode was recut into "Too Many Thieves," a 1967 theatrical release.
22	"The Only Game in Town"	*	Robert van Scoyk	March 18, 1966
Taking the bench as an interim judge on the New York Supreme Court, O'Brien deals with the case of a seaman (Alejandro Rey) accused of murdering a co-worker with a longshoreman's hook. Gene Hackman plays the prosecutor in the case.

* Unknown
