= The Moving Finger (disambiguation) =

The Moving Finger is a 1942 book by Agatha Christie.

The Moving Finger may also refer to:

- The Moving Finger (play), a 1928 work by Patrick Hastings
- "The Moving Finger" (short story), a 1990 story by Stephen King
  - "The Moving Finger" (Monsters episode), based on King's story
- The Moving Finger (film), a 1963 American film
- The Moving Finger, an 1895 short story collection by Mary Gaunt
- The Moving Finger, a 1919 novel by Rose Champion de Crespigny
- "The Moving Finger", a story by Edith Wharton from the 1901 collection Crucial Instances
- "The Moving Finger", a 1985 episode of Miss Marple, based on Christie's book
- "The Moving Finger", a 2006 episode of Agatha Christie's Marple
- "The Moving Finger", a quatrain by Omar Khayyam
- Confessions of the Mind, a 1970 album by The Hollies, released in the U.S. as Moving Finger

== See also ==
- The Moving Finger Writes, a 2010 concerto by Peter Fribbins
- "The Slowly Moving Finger", a 1964 essay by Isaac Asimov published in Of Time and Space and Other Things
