= Gastone Moschin =

Italian actor (1929–2017)

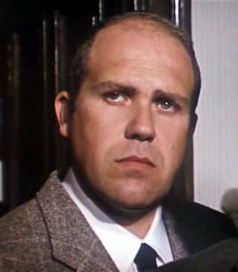
- Moschin in Her Harem (1967)
- Born: 8 June 1929; San Giovanni Lupatoto, Veneto, Kingdom of Italy
- Died: 4 September 2017 (aged 88); Terni, Umbria, Italy
- Occupation: Actor
- Years active: 1956–2001
- Spouse: Marzia Ubaldi (m. 1960; div. 1967)
- Children: 1

Gastone Moschin (Italian pronunciation: [ɡaˈstoːne moˈskin]; 8 June 1929 – 4 September 2017) was an Italian stage, television and film actor.

== Career ==
Born in San Giovanni Lupatoto (Veneto), Moschin graduated from the Accademia Nazionale di Arte Drammatica Silvio D'Amico and then began his career in the 1950s as a theatre actor, first with the Teatro Stabile in Genoa and then with the Piccolo Teatro di Milano in Milan. In the same period Moschin also began to appear in feature films and on television.

In his film career Moschin alternated character roles and, more rarely, leading roles, such as in Seven Times Seven and Caliber 9. His most famous role is that of Rambaldo Melandri in the Amici miei film series (1975–1985). He won two Nastro d'Argento Awards for Best Supporting Actor, in 1967 for Pietro Germi's The Birds, the Bees and the Italians and in 1986 for Nanni Loy's Amici miei – Atto III. Moschin is also well known for the role of Don Fanucci in Francis Ford Coppola's The Godfather Part II.

== Death ==
Gastone Moschin was married to Marzia Ubaldi from 1960 until 1967, he had one daughter (Emanuela Moschin). He died in hospital on 4 September 2017 from cardiomyopathy. He was 88.

== Filmography ==
=== Cinema ===
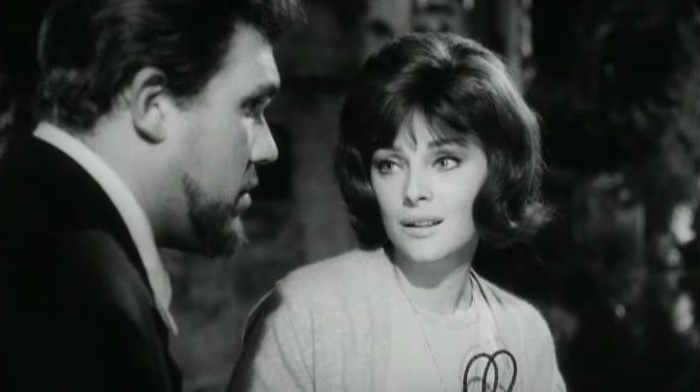
Moschin and Virna Lisi in The Birds, the Bees and the Italians (1966)

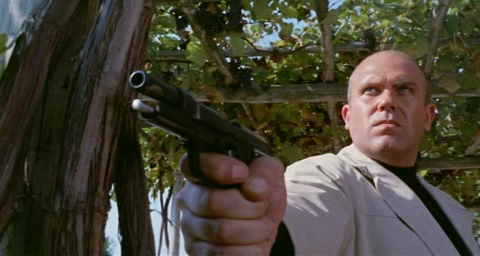
Moschin as Ugo Piazza in Caliber 9 (1972)

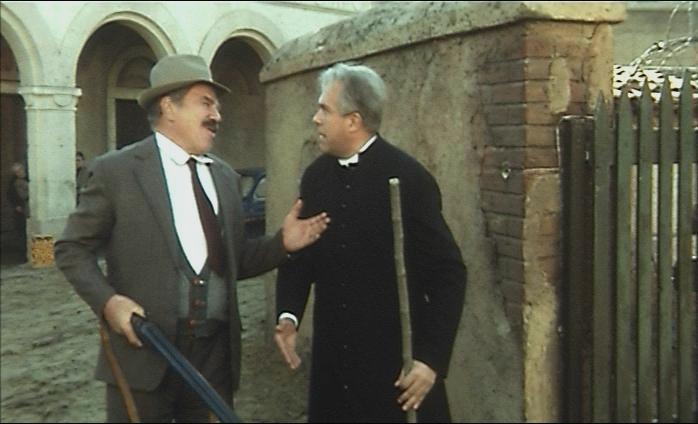
Lionel Stander and Moschin in Don Camillo e i giovani d'oggi (1972)

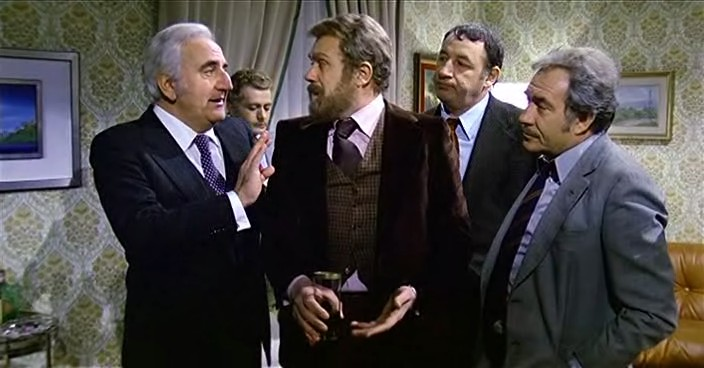
Moschin (in the middle) in Amici miei (1975)

- The Rival (1956) as Marco Riccitelli
- Audace colpo dei soliti ignoti (1960) as Alfredo - Bookseller
- The Joy of Living (1961) as Priest
- Tiro al piccione (1962) as Pasquini
- Roaring Years (1962) as Carmine Passante
- Of Wayward Love (1962) as Marshal (segment "Il serpente")
- The Reunion (1963) as Toro
- Il Fornaretto di Venezia (1963) as Counselor Garzone
- Il Successo (1963) as the brother in law of Giulio
- La visita (1963) as Renato Gusso
- Amore in quattro dimensioni (1964) as the husband (segment "Amore e vita")
- Extraconiugale (1964) as Luigi (episode "La doccia")
- 100 Horsemen (1964) as Frate Carmelo
- Gentlemen of the Night (1964) as Doge Pietro Gradenigo
- Berlin, Appointment for the Spies (1965) as Boris
- Seven Golden Men (1965) as Adolf (the German)
- Seven Golden Men Strike Again (1965) as Adolf
- The Birds, the Bees and the Italians (1966) as Osvaldo Bisigato
- Due killers in fuga (1966)
- Seasons of Our Love (1966) as Carlo Di Giusti aka Tancredi
- Sex Quartet (1966) as Dr. Aldini (segment "Fata Armenia")
- Diamonds Are a Man's Best Friend (1966)
- Top Crack (1967) as Karl
- The Oldest Profession (1967) as Flavius (segment "Nuits romaines, Les")
- L'amore attraverso i secoli (1967) as Jo Laguerre
- Her Harem (1967) as Gianni
- Face to Face (1967) as Man at Puerto del Fuego (uncredited)
- Seven Times Seven (1968) as Benjamin Burton
- Italian Secret Service (1968) as lawyer Ramirez
- La notte è fatta per... rubare (1968)
- Dismissed on His Wedding Night (1968) as the lawyer
- La moglie giapponese (1968)
- Where Are You Going All Naked? (1969) as President
- The Specialist (1969) as Sheriff
- The Conformist (1970) as Manganiello
- Mr. Superinvisible (1970) as Kokofrecovitch
- The Weekend Murders (1970) as Sgt. Aloisius Thorpe
- Ninì Tirabusciò: la donna che inventò la mossa (1970) as Mariotti the Chief of Policea
- Mio padre Monsignore (1971) as Don Alvaro
- Roma Bene (1971) as the monsignor
- Io non vedo, tu non parli, lui non sente (1971) as Metello Bottazzi
- Stanza 17-17 palazzo delle tasse, ufficio imposte (1971) as Giambattista Ranteghin
- The Sicilian Checkmate (1972) as Colonnesi, defense attorney
- Caliber 9 (1972) as Ugo Piazza
- Causa di divozio (1972) as Lawyer
- Don Camillo e i giovani d'oggi (1972) as Don Camillo
- Incensurato provata disonestà carriera assicurata cercasi (1972) as Giuseppe Zaccherin
- Fiorina la vacca (1972) as Ruzante
- The Assassination of Matteotti (1973) as Filippo Turati
- The Sensual Man (1973) as Uncle Edmondo
- Emergency Squad (1974) as Marsigliese
- Commissariato di notturna (1974) as Commissario Emiliano Borghini
- Erotomania (1974) as Rodolfo Persichetti
- The Godfather Part II (1974) as Don Fanucci
- E cominciò il viaggio nella vertigine (1974) as Beilin
- Amici miei (1975) as Rambaldo Melandri
- A Woman at Her Window (1976) as Primoukis
- Wifemistress (1977) as Vincenzo
- Fearless (1978) as Karl Koper
- Lion of the Desert (1980) as Major Tomelli
- Si salvi chi vuole (1980)
- La compagna di viaggio (1980) as the baron
- Carlotta (1981) as Charlie
- Amici miei atto II (1982) as Rambaldo Melandri
- A Joke of Destiny (1983)
- Senza un attimo di respiro (1983) as Minister of the Interiors
- Amici miei – Atto III (1985) as Rambaldo Melandri
- A Thorn in the Heart (1986) as Dottor Trigona
- Rimini Rimini - Un anno dopo (1987) as Oreste Raccà
- Com'è dura l'avventura (1988) as Formigoni ("Vuò cumprà")
- Women in Skirts (1991)
- Non chiamarmi Omar (1992) as Dr. Omar Tavoni
- We Free Kings (1996) as Don Gregorio
- La grande quercia (1997)
- Porzûs (1997) as old Geko

=== Television ===
- Racconti garibaldini (1960)
- Operazione Vega (1962) as Sim
- Il mulino del Po (1963) as Fratognone
- I Miserabili (1964) as Jean Valjean
- Una coccarda per il re (1970) as Jacques Necker
- Le colonne della società (1972) as Karsten Bernick
- La morte di Danton (1972) as Danton
- Rosso veneziano (1976) as Marco Partibon
- Le uova fatali (1977) as Professor Pérsikov
- The Godfather: A Novel for Television (1977, uncredited) as Don Fanucci
- I racconti fantastici di Edgar Allan Poe (1979) as the Judge
- L'Andreana (1982) as Mondo
- Melodramma (1984) as Aldo Scotti
- Nel gorgo del peccato (1987) as Judge Ottavio Pica (1987)
- Les Ritals (1991) as Louvi
- L'avvocato delle donne (1996, episode "Laura") as Avv. Salvi
- Don Matteo (1999) as Bishop
- Sei forte Maestro (2000) as Vittorio Ricci
- Sei forte, Maestro 2 (2000) as Vittorio Ricci
- Don Matteo (2000) as Bishop
- Don Matteo 2 (2001) as Bishop (final appearance)
