= Amici miei – Atto III =

1985 film

- Italian theatrical release poster
- Directed by: Nanni Loy
- Written by: Leo Benvenuti; Piero De Bernardi; Tullio Pinelli; Nanni Loy
- Produced by: Luigi De Laurentiis; Aurelio De Laurentiis
- Starring: Ugo Tognazzi; Gastone Moschin; Adolfo Celi; Renzo Montagnani; Bernard Blier
- Cinematography: Claudio Cirillo
- Edited by: Franco Fraticelli
- Music by: Carlo Rustichelli; Paolo Rustichelli
- Distributed by: Filmauro
- Release date: 1985
- Running time: 110 minutes
- Country: Italy
- Language: Italian

Amici miei – Atto III (internationally released as My Friends Act III and All My Friends Part 3) is a 1985 Italian comedy film directed by Nanni Loy. It is the third chapter in the Amici Miei film series, following Amici miei (1975) and Amici miei – Atto II (1982).

For this film Gastone Moschin was awarded with a Nastro d'Argento for best supporting actor.

== Plot ==
The four Tuscan friends now are over sixty years of age and are nearing retirement. Count Mascetti is always the most unfortunate because in addition to end up in a wheelchair has also lost his wife in a road accident. So his friends to not make him suffer the persuade him to move into in a retirement home, where, however Mascetti never ceases to make his jokes to patients and nurses, with his "supercazzola". Soon after that, the architect Melandri and the barkeeper Necchi join him at the retirement home and take part with him in playing pranks to the other elders. In particular, the man targeted by the three, (also to include the surgeon Sassaroli), an old man (played by Bernard Blier) who dreams about his youth, the four friends give him well-served setting up a scene similar to the wastelands of Hell. There is the old man and conducted with a subset of satanic ritual in which Sassaroli plays the priest and a prostitute is very young sacrificial victim, believes young again. In fact, the four friends pranksters and goliardic have painted the hair black man after he fell asleep. The next day the old man feels like reborn and starts to make a lot of exercises dangerous for a man of his age, dying of a heart attack in a short time.

Meanwhile, at that time Rambaldo Melandri has fallen in love with an old countess, and so friends to enjoy the mock sending you a video in which the Count Raphael "Lello" Mascetti joined with her in bed. To the astonishment and anger Melandri will discover that the woman was nothing more than a note and vulgar whore. After a little time friends start to get bored and so Sssaroli buy the board for more fun by organizing feasts and orgies night. But the old pensioners no longer have the strength to play as the four friends would like, so Mascetti, Sassaroli, Melandri and Necchi go to the station to try again one of their most successful jokes during their happiest time in the seventies. However, the four realize that the days are gone and changed, and people now understood the kind of joke that they had created in their fantasy world. Only Count Mascetti manages to get the better of the "victims" passengers spray ink on the faces of the chair and then run away with others who happily make their way to another station.

== Cast ==
- Ugo Tognazzi as Raffaello "Lello" Mascetti
- Gastone Moschin as Rambaldo Melandri
- Adolfo Celi as Professor Sassaroli
- Renzo Montagnani as Guido Necchi
- Bernard Blier as Sig. Lenzi
- Franca Tamantini as Carmen Necchi
- Gianni Giannini as Cecco, the orderly
- Valeria Sabel as Valeria Migliari
- Enzo Cannavale as Cav. Ferrini
- Mario Feliciani as General Mastrostefano
- Caterina Boratto as Amalia Pecci Bonetti

== See also ==
- List of Italian films of 1985
