= In the Dough =

1933 film

- Title card
- Directed by: Ray McCarey
- Written by: Jack Henley
- Produced by: Samuel Sax
- Starring: Roscoe Arbuckle; Shemp Howard
- Production company: Warner Bros.
- Distributed by: Warner Bros.
- Release date: November 15, 1933
- Running time: 22 minutes
- Country: United States
- Language: English

In the Dough is a 1933 American Pre-Code comedy film starring Fatty Arbuckle and featuring Shemp Howard of the Three Stooges. It was the last film made by Arbuckle, although the last to be released was Tomalio. He died of a heart attack in the early morning hours of June 29, 1933, the day after completing work on the film.

== Plot ==
Roscoe starts his first day of work at a bakery on the same day that local gangsters pay a visit to his boss, Mr. Shultz, demanding protection money. When Mr. Shultz refuses to pay, the gangsters plant an explosive-laden cake in the bakery. When the lead gangster's moll throws a birthday party for him, she orders a cake -- and it turns out to be the same booby-trapped cake. Seeking revenge, the gangsters descend on the bakery and begin throwing dough around. Roscoe escalates the battle by breaking out the pies, and the crooks are subdued.

== Cast ==
- Roscoe "Fatty" Arbuckle as Roscoe
- Lionel Stander as Toots
- Shemp Howard as Bugs
- Dan Coleman as Mr. Shultz
- Marie Marion as Shultz's cashier
- Gracie Worth as Maisie
- Fred Harper as Mr. Smith, customer
- Ralph Sanford as the Policeman

== See also ==
- Fatty Arbuckle filmography
