= Dream of a Summer Night =

1983 film by Gabriele Salvatores

- Directed by: Gabriele Salvatores
- Written by: Gabriele Salvatores
- Produced by: Sergio Lentati
- Starring: Alberto Lionello
- Cinematography: Dante Spinotti
- Edited by: Gabriella Cristiani
- Music by: Mauro Pagani
- Release date: 1983
- Language: Italian

Dream of a Summer Night (Italian: Sogno di una notte d'estate, also spelled as Dream of a Summer's Night) is a 1983 Italian musical film written and directed by Gabriele Salvatores, at his directorial debut. Based on a rock musical directed by the same Salvatores, it is a musical adaptation of William Shakespeare's A Midsummer Night's Dream. It was screened in the "De Sica" section at the 40th edition of the Venice International Film Festival.

== Plot ==
The wedding day of Teseo and Ippolita, two young heirs of the Milanese bourgeoisie, is near. Everything has been arranged: the party will take place in the splendid family villa in the Lombard plain. Among the guests there are Lisandro, Demetrio, Erminia and Elena, inseparable and involved in a strange relationship made of impulses, tenderness and whims. Meanwhile, in a nearby farmhouse, some guys are trying out the show they will perform during the party. The neighboring forest, however, is populated by elves, fairies and other strange creatures, ruled by King Oberon and his wife Titania, queen of the night. Over the course of the night, the king and his subjects enjoy spying on the four youngsters and pushing them to each other without a reason, thanks to the powerful elixirs given to them by the elf Puck. Only on the wedding day, while the show is going on stage in the big hall, Lisandro, Demetrio, Erminia and Elena will be able to shed light on their true feelings.

== Cast ==
- Alberto Lionello as Theseus
- Erika Blanc as Hippolyta
- Luca Barbareschi as Lysander
- Ferdinando Bruni as Puck
- Flavio Bucci as Oberon
- Alessandro Haber as Egeus
- Giuseppe Cederna as Demetrius
- Sabina Vannucchi as Helena
- Gianna Nannini as Titania
- Augusta Gori as Hermia
- Renato Sarti as Quince
- Elio De Capitani as Bottom
- Cristina Crippa as Shout
- Luca Toracca as Flute
- Doris von Thury as Starveling
- Claudio Bisio as Moth
- Ida Marinelli as Eugenia

== See also ==
- List of Italian films of 1983
