= The Red Headed Corpse =

- Directed by: Renzo Russo
- Written by: Renzo Russo
- Produced by: Mario Maestrelli
- Starring: Farley Granger
- Cinematography: Luciano Trasatti
- Edited by: Attilio Vincioni
- Music by: Sante Maria Romitelli
- Distributed by: Rasfilm
- Release date: 1972
- Running time: 82 minutes
- Countries: Italy; Turkey

The Red Headed Corpse (Italian: La rossa dalla pelle che scotta, also known as The Sensuous Doll and Sweet Spirits) is a 1972 Italian-Turkish giallo film directed by Renzo Russo.

== Cast ==
- Farley Granger as John Ward
- Erika Blanc as The Sensuous Doll
- Krista Nell as The Subservient Doll
- Ivana Novak as Mala
- Venantino Venantini
- Aydin Terzel
