= My Friends (film) =

Amici Miei
- Italian theatrical release poster by Renato Casaro
- Directed by: Mario Monicelli
- Written by: Pietro Germi; Leonardo Benvenuti; Piero De Bernardi; Tullio Pinelli
- Starring: Ugo Tognazzi; Gastone Moschin; Philippe Noiret; Duilio Del Prete; Olga Karlatos; Silvia Dionisio; Franca Tamantini; Angela Goodwin; Milena Vukotic; Bernard Blier; Adolfo Celi
- Music by: Carlo Rustichelli
- Distributed by: Rizzoli Film
- Release date: 15 August 1975
- Running time: 140 minutes
- Country: Italy
- Language: Italian

My Friends (Italian: Amici miei) is a 1975 Italian comedy film directed by Mario Monicelli.

The film project belonged to Pietro Germi, who had no chance to make it happen because of his untimely death. The opening credits of the film, in fact, paid tribute to the author with the words "a film by Pietro Germi", which is followed only later by "directed by Mario Monicelli".

The film, which made it to number one on the Italian box-office in front of Steven Spielberg's Jaws, was followed by two sequels, Amici miei – Atto II (1982, also by Monicelli), Amici miei – Atto III (1985), directed by Nanni Loy.

== Production ==
The project was begun by Pietro Germi, who could not finish it due to his death. Monicelli, who replaced him, moved the set from Bologna to Florence, as the filmmaker was raised in Tuscany (many of the zingarate illustrated in the movie were actually inspired by tricks and pranks played by Monicelli himself during his youth). Its center was a real bar in Piazza Demidoff, along the River Arno, which was named "Bar Amici Miei" and featured posters of the film. In the 1990s the bar changed its name and was modernized becoming an American bar and losing all connections to the film.

In the original version Philippe Noiret is dubbed by Renzo Montagnani, who, in the sequels, replaced Del Prete as Necchi.

== Plot ==
Like in many other Monicelli movies, the main theme of Amici miei is friendship, seen from a rather bittersweet point of view. It tells the story of four middle-aged friends in Florence who organize together idle pranks (called zingarate, "gypsy shenanigans") in a continuous attempt to prolong childhood during their adult life.

Tognazzi (right) attempting to confuse a traffic agent with his "Supercazzola", a trademark prank consisting of a series of meaningless, fast-spoken phrases

Count Mascetti (Ugo Tognazzi) is an impoverished noble who has no means to support his family, but does not renounce high living pleasures anyway, and has an underage mistress, Titti (Silvia Dionisio). Perozzi (Philippe Noiret) is an easy-living journalist harassed by the unceasing disapproval of his wife and his son. Melandri (Gastone Moschin) is an architect employed by City Hall (for the preservation and restoration of the City's countless monuments), whose main goal is to find the ideal woman. Necchi (Duilio Del Prete) is the owner of a café and pool hall where the friends usually plan their zingarate.

During the movie, they are joined by a renowned, military-like surgeon, professor Alfeo Sassaroli (Adolfo Celi), in whose clinic they recover after being hospitalized, injured after a mismanaged zingarata. Melandri falls in love with Sassaroli's wife, exclaiming "I've seen the Madonna!", only to discover she has psychological problems.

The plot is mostly composed of elaborate practical jokes organized by the friends, including the creation of a fake mafia mob (actually, from Marseille) in whose "criminal acts" they involve a pensioner, Righi (Bernard Blier), who used to snatch croissants from the cake tray in Necchi's café, and Mascetti's attempts to save his marriage despite his relationship with Titti.

The film ends with Perozzi's death, which still does not deprive his friends of their desecrating hijinks, not even in face of their own mortality. Instead, Perozzi's wife is skeptical at first, since she wonders if his death can actually be one of his pranks. Criticized by Melandri for her lack of tears, she comments: "One mourns if somebody dies. But here, nobody died". Mascetti replies: "Well, he wasn't somebody, but I liked him".

During the funeral procession, they "pay homage" to their dead friend by telling the wide-eyed Righi that Perozzi was killed for being a traitor to their mafia. Melandri starts sobbing out of laughter, because Righi believed the hoax, while the other friends also break up. Righi, believing that they are heartbroken, is moved for real.

== Cast ==
- Ugo Tognazzi as Lello Mascetti
- Gastone Moschin as Rambaldo Melandri
- Philippe Noiret as Giorgio Perozzi
- Duilio Del Prete as Guido Necchi
- Olga Karlatos as Donatella Sassaroli
- Silvia Dionisio as Titti
- Franca Tamantini as Carmen Necchi
- Angela Goodwin as Laura Perozzi
- Milena Vukotic as Alice Mascetti
- Bernard Blier as Niccolò Righi
- Adolfo Celi as Professor Alfeo Sassaroli
- Maurizio Scattorin as Luciano Perozzi (Perozzi's son)
- Ulla Johannsen as Titti's Lover (uncredited)
