= Daniel Emilfork =

Chilean actor (1924–2006)

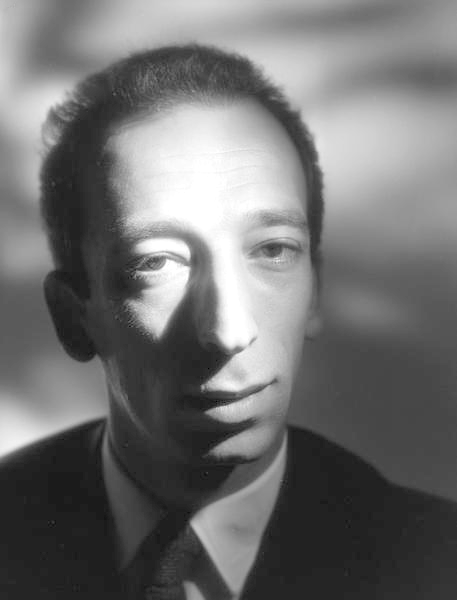
- Emilfork in 1958
- Born: Daniel Emilfork Berenstein; 7 April 1924; Providencia, Santiago Metropolitan Region, Chile
- Died: 17 October 2006 (aged 82); Paris, France
- Occupation: Actor
- Spouse: Denise Péron (m. 1951; died 1996)
- Partner: Frédéric Leidgens
- Children: 1

Daniel Emilfork Berenstein (7 April 1924 – 17 October 2006), known professionally as Daniel Emilfork, was a Chilean stage and film actor who made his career in France.

== Early life ==
Emilfork was born on 7 April 1924 in Providencia (Note: Also cited as San Felipe.), Chile to Jewish-Ukrainian parents. Emilfork had one brother.

Emilfork's parents were socialists who fled persecution in the Soviet Union.

== Career ==
Emilfork was a teacher at Internado Nacional Barros Arana. According to his friend Alejandro Jodorowsky, Emilfork didn't feel comfortable being a homosexual man in Chile. In 1949, aged 25, Emilfork settled in Paris to work as an English teacher. Emilfork first began studying acting under Tania Balachova.

Emilfork's distinctive facial features helped contribute to his career as a character actor for films such as The City of Lost Children (1995). He specialized in roles of villains. Previously he had played in The Devil's Nightmare (1971), Travels with My Aunt (1972) and Fellini's Casanova (1976), in Roman Polanski's Pirates (1986) and in Taxandria (1994). He carried on acting up until his death, his last film appearing in 2007.

== Personal life ==
In 1951, Emilfork married Denise Péron (1925–1996), a French actress. Emilfork and Péron had one daughter, the actress and director Stéphanie Loïk (born 1951).

From 1980 onwards Emilfork was the partner of the actor Frédéric Leidgens.

On 17 October 2006 Emilfork died in Paris, aged 82. He was cremated at Père Lachaise Cemetery on the 20 October 2006 .

== Selected filmography ==
- School for Love (1955) - Le professeur de violon
- Frou-Frou (1955) - Le critique en peinture (uncredited)
- Sophie and the Crime (1955) - Le barman du Montana (uncredited)
- The Hunchback of Notre Dame (1956) - Andry le Rouge
- No Sun in Venice (1957)
- Les Espions (1957) - Helmut Petersen
- La Parisienne (1957) - Un huissier d'ambassade (uncredited)
- Maigret Sets a Trap (1958) - Manic (uncredited)
- Le Temps des œufs durs (1958) - L'expert en tableaux
- Goha (1958) - L'aveugle Ibrahim
- Sans famille (1958) - George, le valet de Milligan
- Les Motards (1959) - L'espion aux pompes funèbres
- Les Tripes au soleil (1959)
- Du rififi chez les femmes (1959) - Luigi le Napolitain
- Pantalaskas (1960) - Le baron
- Le Bal des espions (1960) - Un tueur
- Tintin and the Golden Fleece (1960) - Voice dubbing (uncredited)
- The Triumph of Michael Strogoff (1961) - Ben Routh
- Le Rendez-vous de minuit (1962) - Le joueur de baccara
- La Poupée (1962) - Gant de Crin
- Les Bricoleurs (1963) - Igor, le majordome
- Jeff Gordon, Secret Agent (1963) - Yanakos - le grec
- Seul... à corps perdu (1963) - Le valet de chambre
- Ballade pour un voyou (1963) - Molok
- OSS 117 se déchaîne (1963) - Sacha
- Nutty, Naughty Chateau (1963) - Gunther
- Commissaire mène l'enquête (1963) - L'aveugle (segment "Fermez votre porte")
- Mission to Venice (1964) - Mr. Coliso
- L'assassin viendra ce soir (1964) - Le chef du gang des pompes funèbres
- What's New Pussycat? (1965) - Gas Station man
- The Duke's Gold (1965) - Le gardien
- The Liquidator (1965) - Gregory
- Dis-moi qui tuer (1965) - Teotihuacan
- Lady L (1965) - Kobeleff
- Trans-Europ-Express (1966) - Phony Policeman
- Lotus Flowers for Miss Quon (1967) - Inspector Gonsart
- The Unknown Man of Shandigor (1967) - Herbert Von Krantz -le savant
- Midi minuit (1970) - Robert Lorrain
- The Devil's Nightmare (1971) - Satan
- Kill! Kill! Kill! Kill! (1971) - Mejid
- Travels with My Aunt (1972) - Colonel Hakim
- Fellini's Casanova (1976) - Marquis Du Bois
- Who Is Killing the Great Chefs of Europe? (1978) - Saint-Juste
- The Thief of Baghdad (1978) - The Genie
- Subversion (1979) - Cagliostro
- Deux heures moins le quart avant Jésus-Christ (1982) - Tatouius
- Meurtres à domicile (1982) - Julius Zepernick
- La Belle captive (1983) - Inspector Francis
- Pirates (1986) - Hendrik
- The Passage (1986) - La Mort (uncredited)
- The Tribulations of Balthazar Kober (1988) - Le recteur
- Artcore oder Der Neger (1993)
- Taxandria (1994) - First Minister
- The Flying Dutchman (1995) - Ketterjager
- The City of Lost Children (1995) - Krank
- Babel (1999) - Yatscov's Voice
- Les Frères Sœur (2000) - André
- Let's Dance (2007) - Le médecin militaire (final film role)
