= The Thief of Baghdad (1978 film) =

- Theatrical poster
- Directed by: Clive Donner
- Written by: Andrew Birkin; AJ Carothers
- Produced by: Thomas M.J. Johnston; Aida Young
- Starring: Roddy McDowall; Kabir Bedi; Frank Finlay; Marina Vlady; Daniel Emilfork; Ian Holm; Pavla Ustinov; Terence Stamp; Peter Ustinov
- Cinematography: Dennis C. Lewiston
- Edited by: Peter Tanner
- Music by: John Cameron
- Production companies: Palm Films, Ltd. Victorine Studios
- Distributed by: Columbia Pictures (International); National Broadcasting Company (US)
- Release date: 23 November 1978 (US)
- Running time: 102 minutes
- Countries: United Kingdom; France
- Language: English

The Thief of Baghdad is a 1978 fantasy film directed by Clive Donner and starring Roddy MacDowall and Kabir Bedi. A British and French co-production, the film was released theatrically, except for the United States where it debuted on television.

== Plot ==
Soon after the death of his father, Prince Taj of Sakkar is persuaded to compete for the hand of Princess Yasmine of Baghdad. He is ambushed by agents of his own Wazir, Jaudur. His royal seal is stolen and an innocent man is murdered in his place. Arriving in Baghdad, dressed in rags and hungry, he befriends Hassan, magician and thief.

Stealing suitable robes, Taj and Hassan present themselves to the Caliph, where Taj makes an immediate impression on Yasmine. Wazir Jaudur arrives on a flying carpet to join the suitors. Jaudur, bearing Taj's royal seal, claims to be king following the alleged murder of Prince Taj; he accuses Taj of being an impostor. Taj challenges Jaudur to a duel, but he loses because Jaudur, an evil sorcerer, is protected from injury due to his soul being hidden at a secret location, making him immortal.

The Caliph, wanting to believe Taj but bound by custom, is forced to accept Jaudur's claim. Yasmine's lady-in-waiting, Perizadah, reminds him of a prophecy given at Yasmine's birth that her wedding would bring great wealth. Using this as an excuse to stall for time, the Caliph sends all the suitors on a quest "to find that object in all the world that has the most value", and return in three moons.

Hassan, convinced of Taj's sincerity because of Jaudur's repeated murder attempts, joins him on the quest. Perizadah, acting on Yasmine's behalf (and attracted to Hassan) guides them to a place where they can overhear Jaudur force information from traveling holy man Abu Bakare. They learn of the existence of an all-seeing eye that will help Taj defeat Jaudur.

They steal Jaudur's flying carpet, but when Taj commands, "Take me to where my heart would go," the carpet doesn't leave Yasmine's side. Hassan commands, "Carpet, take us where I would go." The carpet takes them to the temple of the all-seeing eye.

At the temple, the gatekeeper warns that Taj must not allow anything to lure him from the path or he will be turned to stone. Taj sustains insults about his parentage, and resists rescuing a man being devoured by a serpent. He nearly succumbs to a fire trap, but sees a statue of someone who failed before.

Within sight of the temple, Taj is lured away by an image of Yasmine and is turned to stone.

Hassan reluctantly follows Taj with the gatekeeper's blessing: "May your knowledge of deception lead you straight as an arrow to the truth." Hassan resists the insulting chants with more humour than Taj, and his fear prevents him from intervening with the serpent illusion. He is nearly turned aside by chests of treasure, but the sight of the statue of Taj refocuses him.

At the temple, he finds the eye is out of reach. The inscription at his feet, "The truth lies within thy reach," causes him to realize that the eye only appears out of reach and is actually in his grasp. When he grabs it, Taj is restored. He uses the eye to learn Yasmine's desire and also the secret location of Jaudur's soul: the nest of a mysterious bird. They attempt to return to Baghdad by flying carpet, but are attacked by Jaudur's men on flying horses. The carpet is slashed to pieces. Taj and Hassan fall in different directions.

Jaudur returns with the eye to Baghdad. Other suitors return with other fabulous gifts, but Jaudur exposes the other gifts as fakes. When presented with the eye, Yasmine uses it to locate Taj and learns that he is lost in the desert. Because the eye never lies, the Caliph realizes that Jaudur is the impostor all along and that Taj is the true Prince of Sakkar. But Jaudur uses a spell to hypnotize Yasmine, her father, and the people into agreeing to the marriage.

Taj discovers a bottle in the sand. Opening it releases a giant genie who tries to kill him. Taj tricks the genie back into the bottle. The genie offers Taj three wishes if released. Taj asks to be reunited with Hassan, who is resting in an oasis with beautiful harem girls.

Next he asks the genie to take them to the place (the bird's nest) where the soul of Jaudur lies. In the nest, Taj uses his sword to break open the egg and retrieve the soul. The bird returns and attacks him, but Hassan releases the genie, who shoos off the bird before taking them back to Baghdad, just in time to prevent the wedding ceremony between Jaudur and the still-hypnotized Yasmine. Taj then smashes Jaudur's soul to the floor, destroying him for good. The hypnotic spell is broken and the grateful Caliph blesses the marriage of Taj and Yasmine, while Hassan and Perizadah fly away on Jaudur's fully-restored flying carpet.

== Cast ==
- Roddy McDowall as Hassan
- Kabir Bedi as Prince Taj
- Frank Finlay as Abu Bakare
- Marina Vlady as Perizadah
- Pavla Ustinov as Princess Yasmine
- Daniel Emilfork as the Genie
- Ian Holm as The Gatekeeper
- Terence Stamp as Wazir Jaudur
- Peter Ustinov as The Caliph
- Marina Sirtis as Harem Girl

== Reception ==
"An enchanting gem. The fantasy's quality of wonderment and simple moral have been preserved to enchant yet another generation of youngsters. You don't have to be a kid to enjoy it." Kevin Thomas, Los Angeles Times.

"It's a faltering hand stoking the high camp fire here. Behind the ornate theatricality and sumptuous effects of this remake there lurks a total lack of conviction. Hyperactive McDowall (the thief) is upstaged by old pro Ustinov as the Caliph; Kabir Bedi, once India's 'highest paid male model', is a joke as the prince, meant to symbolise the alliance of magic and muscle; and Terence Stamp, as a lethargic representative of Supreme Evil, simply waits around for henchmen or flying carpets to do the dirty work."
