= Ulla Johannsen =

Actress

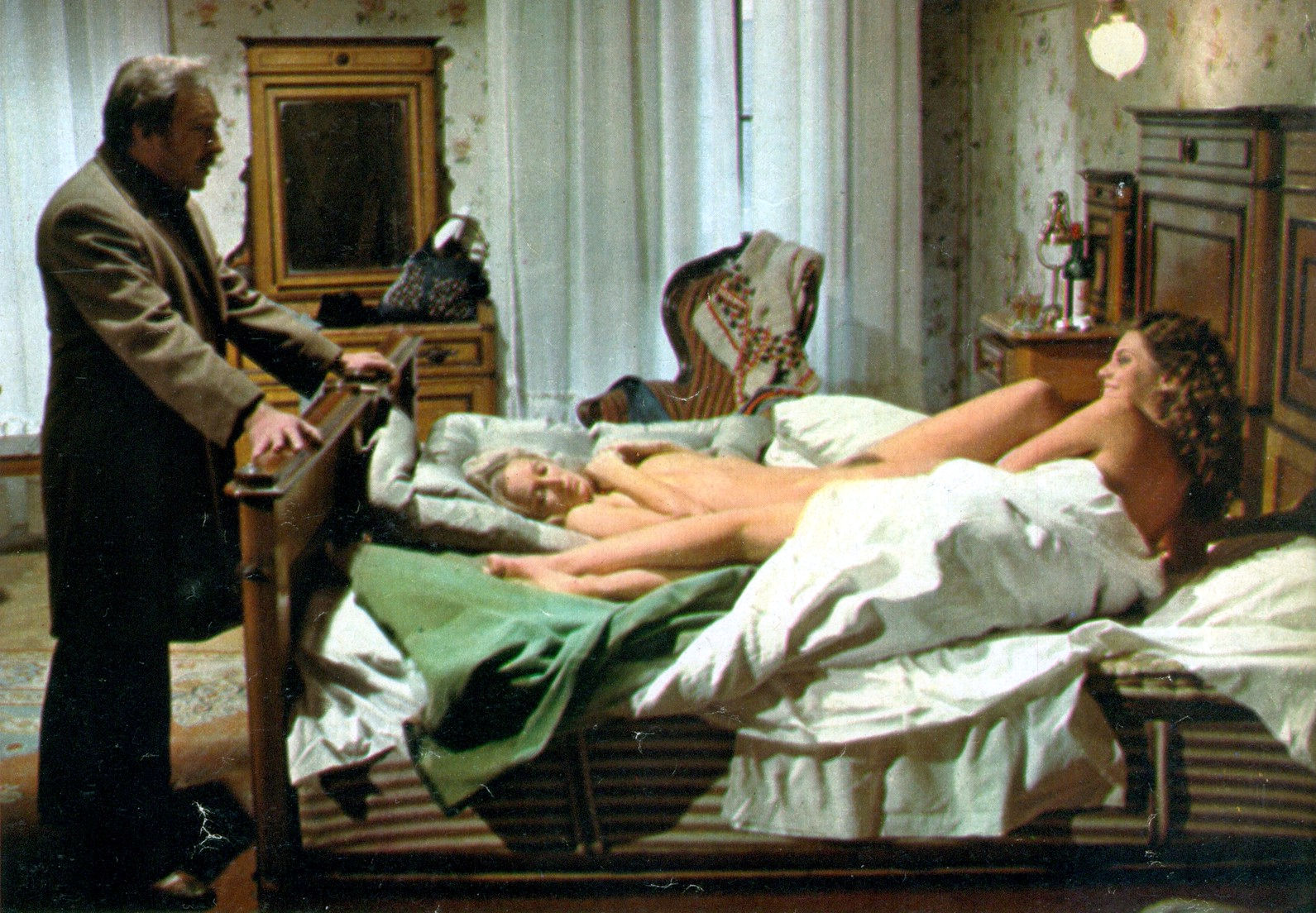
- Johannsen (centre) with Ugo Tognazzi and Silvia Dionisio in My Friends (1975)
- Other name: Milla Johansson
- Occupation: Actress
- Years active: 1971–1979

Ulla Johannsen (also credited as Milla Johansson) is an actress known for her appearances in supporting roles of various Italian films during the 1970s, such as The Sicilian Checkmate (1972), Flatfoot (1973), My Friends (1975), and Liebes Lager (1976).

While shooting an outdoor scene for the film Beach House (1978) on the bank of a stream near Viterbo, in which Johannsen and other actresses (including Ely Galleani) were completely naked, a crowd of onlookers gathered. This caused a traffic jam, so much so that soon after the police had to intervene, which led the actresses ending up at the police station and were released shortly after.

== Filmography ==
Year	Title	Role	Notes
1971	The Blonde in the Blue Movie	Ulla, Sex Party's Guest	
1972	The Sicilian Checkmate	Blonde Woman	
1972	Sei iellato amico, hai incontrato Sacramento	Saloon girl	Credited as Milla Johansson; Credits only
1972	So Sweet, So Dead	First Victim	
1972	Amiche: andiamo alla festa		Credited as Milla Johansson
1973	Flatfoot	Blonde Woman in Bar	
1974	A Black Ribbon for Deborah	Blonde Party Guest	
1974	Delitto d'autore	Girl at the orgy	
1975	The Immortal Bachelor	Party Guest	
1975	My Friends	Titti's lover	
1976	Strange Occasion	Fluffer	Segment: "Italian Superman"
1976	Liebes Lager		Credited as Milla Johansson
1977	Emanuelle in America	Zodiac Girl #4	
1977	The Cynic, the Rat and the Fist	Wife of Di Maggio	
1977	Maschio latino cercasi	Prostitute	Segment: "Accadde a Napoli"
1977	Kakkientruppen	Mila	
1977	Emanuelle Around the World	Girl Penetrated by Banana	Uncredited
1977	Beach House	Naked Blonde Woman	
1978	The Inglorious Bastards	Naked Woman with Machine Gun	
1979	The Humanoid	Girl Drained of Blood	
1979	Il mondo porno di due sorelle	Woman at the Bordello	
1979	Play Motel	Client at Play Motel	
