= Mario Russo (director) =

Italian film director and assistant director

- Born: 22 March 1926 (age 99); Vieste, Province of Foggia, Italy
- Occupations: Film director; Assistant director
- Years active: 1950–1970

Mario Russo (22 March 1926 Vieste) is an Italian film director and assistant director.

== Biography ==
Russo began as an actor in 1948 in Luigi Comencini's film Guagilo also known as Hey Boy. Three years later Russo began in 1951 as an assistant director and from 1957 was responsible for several Italian versions of Hollywood films. With the overall direction of the 1967 film Realtà romanzesca, his involvement in the industry ended.

== Selected filmography ==
Year	Title	Role	Notes
1948	Guagilo	Actor	As Peppinello
1957	Seven Hills of Rome	Co-director	With Roy Rowland
1958	The Naked Maja	Co-director	With Henry Koster
1960	The Angel Wore Red	Co-director	With Nunnally Johnson
1961	Il mondo di notte numero 2	Co-director	With Gianni Proia
1961	Malesia Magica	Co-director	With Lionetto Fabbri
1964	Three Swords for Rome	Writer	
1966	Z7 Operation Rembrandt	Editor	By Giancarlo Romitelli
1967	Top Crack	Director	
