= Erika Blanc =

Italian actress (born 1942)

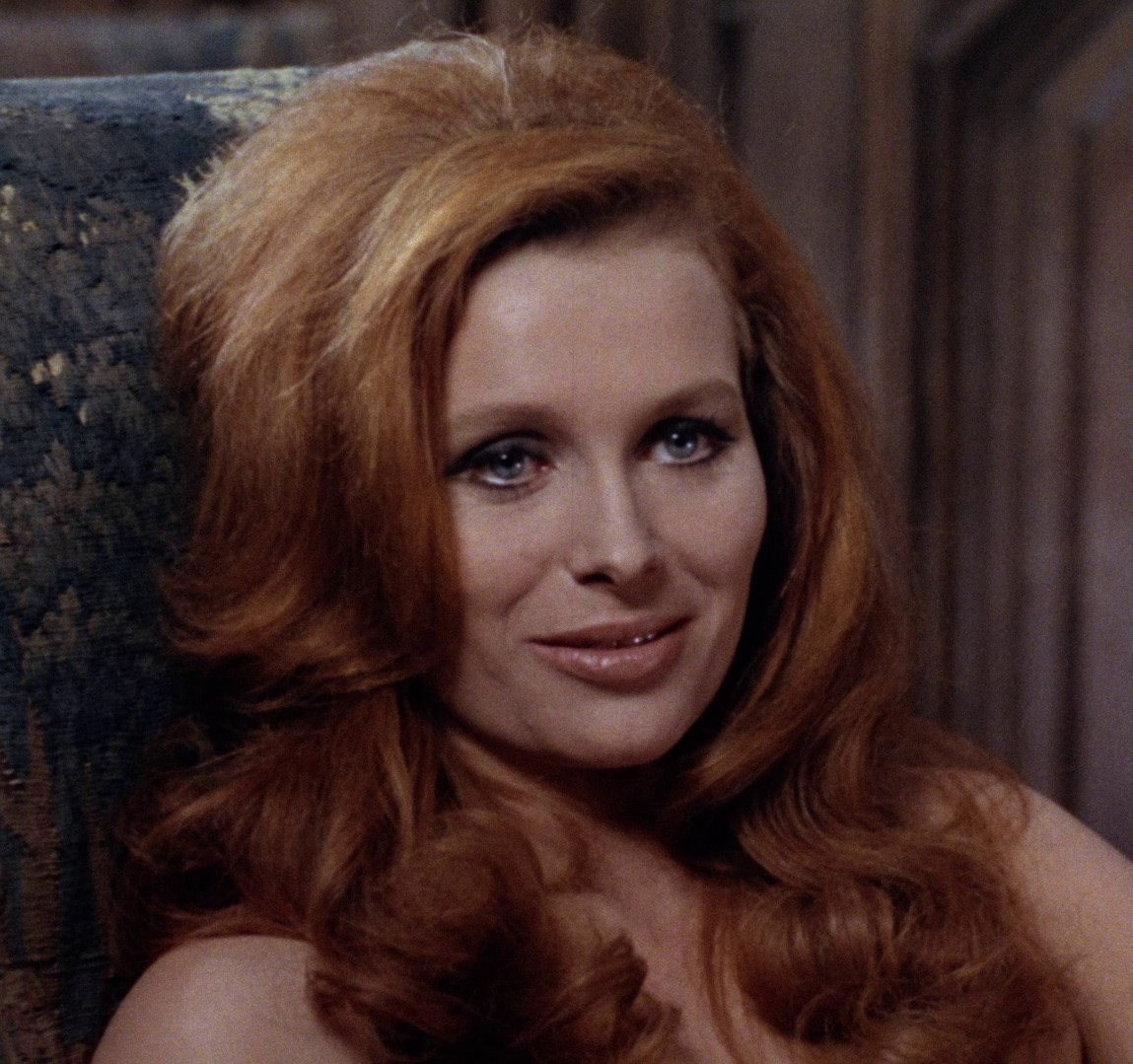
- Erika Blanc in the movie The Devil's Nightmare (1971)
- Born: Enrica Bianchi Colombatto; 23 July 1942 (age 83); Brescia, Kingdom of Italy
- Occupation: Actress

Erika Blanc (born Enrica Bianchi Colombatto; 23 July 1942) is an Italian actress.

== Career ==
Her most notable role was as the first fictional character Emmanuelle in Io, Emmanuelle (1969). Blanc starred in several cult European horror films, including The Third Eye (1966), Kill, Baby, Kill (1966), So Sweet... So Perverse (1969), The Night Evelyn Came Out of the Grave (1971), The Devil's Nightmare (1971), The Red Headed Corpse (1972) and Mark of the Devil Part II (1973).

Her other film credits include roles in Django Shoots First (1966), Long Arm of the Godfather (1972), Tony Arzenta (1973), The Stranger and the Gunfighter (1974), Eye of the Cat (1976) and Dream of a Summer Night (1983).

She recently returned to films with small but intense roles under the direction of Turkish-born director Ferzan Özpetek, acting as Antonia's mother in Le fate ignoranti (2001), and as the sensitive, alcohol-addicted Maria Clara in Sacred Heart (2005). In 2003 she starred as the grandmother in Adored, directed by Marco Filiberti.

== Selected filmography ==
- Agent 077: Mission Bloody Mary (1965)
- Operation Atlantis (1965)
- Lady Morgan's Vengeance (1965)
- Django Shoots First (1966)
- Target Goldseven (1966)
- Blood at Sundown (1966)
- The Third Eye (1966)
- Spies Strike Silently (1966)
- Kill, Baby, Kill (1966)
- Last Man to Kill (1966)
- Blood at Sundown (1966)
- El hombre del puño de oro (1967)
- Halleluja for Django (1967)
- Tom Dollar (1967)
- The Longest Hunt (1968)
- Seven Times Seven (1968)
- The Magnificent Tony Carrera (1968)
- Hell in Normandy (1968)
- Summit (1968)
- So Sweet... So Perverse (1969)
- Io, Emmanuelle (1969)
- Con quale amore, con quanto amore (1970)
- Stagecoach of the Condemned (1970)
- Sartana's Here… Trade Your Pistol for a Coffin (1970)
- La casa delle mele mature (1971)
- Human Cobras (1971)
- The Night Evelyn Came Out of the Grave (1971)
- The Devil's Nightmare (1971)
- The Red Headed Corpse (1972)
- Long Arm of the Godfather (1972)
- Love and Death in the Garden of the Gods (1972)
- The Godfather's Friend (1972)
- Mark of the Devil Part II (1973)
- Bella, ricca, lieve difetto fisico, cerca anima gemella (1973)
- Giorni d'amore sul filo di una lama (1973)
- Tony Arzenta (1973)
- Primo tango a Roma - Storia d'amore e d'alchimia (1973)
- Bruna, formosa, cerca superdotato (1973)
- The Stranger and the Gunfighter (1974)
- Il domestico (1974)
- I figli di nessuno (1974)
- Bello come un arcangelo (1974)
- Una libélula para cada muerto (1975)
- Giochi erotici di una famiglia per bene (1975)
- Eye of the Cat (1976)
- La portiera nuda (1976)
- The Mistress Is Served (1976)
- Carcerato (1981)
- Dream of a Summer Night (1983)
- Body Puzzle (1992)
- Le fate ignoranti (2001)
- Adored (2003)
- Sacred Heart (2005)
- A Second Childhood (2010)
- The Big Heart of Girls (2011)
- I Killed Napoléon (2015)
- The Prize (2017)
- Guests in the Villa (2020)
- Dante (2022)
- The Dew Point (2023)
