= Alessandra Celi =

Italian actress (born 1966)

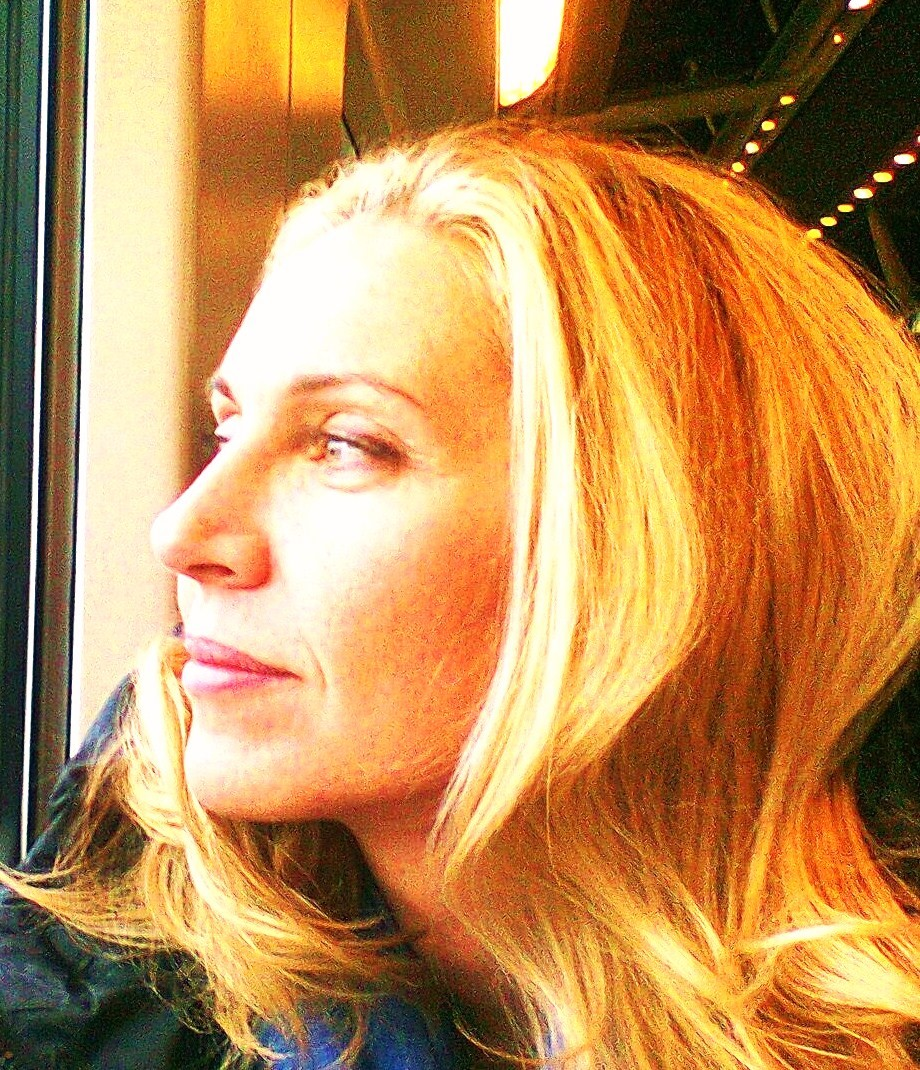
- Born: 15 August 1966 (age 59); London, United Kingdom
- Occupation: Actress
- Years active: 1988–present
- Parent(s): Adolfo Celi; Veronica Lazăr

Alessandra Celi (born August 15, 1966) is an Italian actress. She is the daughter of Adolfo Celi and Veronica Lazăr.

== Filmography ==
=== Film ===
- Piccole stelle, directed by Nicola Di Francescantonio (1988)
- Il mostro, directed by Roberto Benigni (1994)
- L'anniversario, directed by Mario Orfini (1999)
- Caterina va in città, directed by Paolo Virzì (2003)

=== Television ===
- Salvo D'Acquisto, directed by Alberto Sironi (2003)
- Mio figlio, directed by Luciano Odorisio (2005)
- Don Matteo 5 - episode La forza del sorriso, directed by Giulio Base (2006)
- Io e mio figlio - Nuove storie per il commissario Vivaldi, directed by Luciano Odorisio (2010)
- Don Matteo 8 - episode Era mia figlia, directed by Giulio Base (2011)
