= Jean Brismée =

Belgian film director and author

Jean Brismée (August 20, 1926 – January 18, 2024) was a Belgian film director, author of documentary and fantasy films, best known for the 1971 cult horror film The Devil's Nightmare.

He was born at Pipaix, Leuze-en-Hainaut, Belgium.

He authored about 40 films, but The Devil's Nightmare was the only full feature film of his.

In 1962 he was among the founders of Institut national supérieur des arts du spectacle et des techniques de diffusion, a Belgian film school.

He obtained a degree in mathematical sciences from the Free University of Brussels. After that he became passionate in filmmaking and pioneered making educational shorts, starting with Le théorème de Pythagore (1955, about the Pythagorean theorem).

His short Monsieur Plateau received a unanimous Special Jury Prize of Short Film Palme d'Or at the 1965 Cannes Film Festival.

In 1995 he published the book Cinéma: cent ans de cinéma en Belgique.
