= Seven Times Seven =

1969 film

- DVD cover
- Directed by: Michele Lupo
- Written by: Sergio Donati
- Produced by: Marco Vicario
- Starring: Gastone Moschin
- Cinematography: Franco Villa
- Edited by: Sergio Montanari
- Music by: Armando Trovajoli
- Release date: 24 January 1969
- Running time: 92 minutes
- Country: Italy
- Language: Italian

Seven Times Seven (Italian: Sette volte sette) is a 1969 Italian crime comedy caper directed by Michele Lupo and starring Gastone Moschin.

== Plot ==
A gang of prison inmates escape and rob the UK's Royal Mint. They then sneak back to prison.

== Cast ==
- Gastone Moschin as Benjamin Burton
- Lionel Stander as Sam car thief
- Raimondo Vianello as Bodoni
- Gordon Mitchell as Big Ben
- Paolo Gozlino as Bingo (as Paul Stevens)
- Nazzareno Zamperla as Bananas
- Teodoro Corrà as Briggs
- Erika Blanc as Mildred
- Terry-Thomas as Police Inspector
- Turi Ferro as Bernard
- Adolfo Celi as Jail Manager
- Paolo Bonacelli as Jail warden
- Ray Lovelock as Mildred's lover
- Gladys Dawson as Miss Higgins
- Neil McCarthy as Prison warden Mr. Docherty
