= Top Crack =

1967 Italian film directed by Mario Russo

- Directed by: Mario Russo
- Screenplay by: Marcello Fondato; Luisa Montagnana
- Produced by: Luigi Campi
- Starring: Terry-Thomas; Gastone Moschin; Didier Haudepin; Oreste Lionello
- Cinematography: Ennio Guarnieri
- Edited by: Giuseppe Baghdighian
- Music by: Gianni Marchetti
- Production companies: FILM & VIDEO S.R.L.
- Release date: 1967
- Running time: 100 minutes 91 minutes (German version)
- Country: Italy
- Languages: Italian; German

Top Crack (German: Immer Ärger mit den Lümmeln) is a 1967 Italian-German comedy film directed by Mario Russo. The film is scored by Gianni Marchetti.

== Plot ==
Two kidnappers, Charles and Karl, head to Rome with the aim of kidnapping a famous billionaire, Mr. Feril, who is also the inventor of a powder that turns into an egg after it is cooked.

Once they have the ransom, it ends up stolen by a gang of kids led by Uno.

At the end, jewelry is tied to a couple of balloons by the gang. Both Charles and Karl watch helplessly as the gang take shots at the balloons, resulting in the jewelry falling into the sea.

== Cast ==
- Terry-Thomas as Charles
- Gastone Moschin as Karl
- Victor Francen as Mr. Feril
- Oreste Lionello as Peter
- Mirella Maravidi as Agatha
- Didier Haudepin as Uno
- Stella Interlenghi as Due
- Lorna Palombini as Tre
- Consuelo Aranyi as Quattro
- Christiane Maybach
- Gian Luigi Polidoro
- Valentino Macchi

== Release ==
The film music was released as an LP (CAM AMG.6) with 14 titles. in March 1967. Additionally the film itself passed censorship around the same month. In Germany, it was known under at least two alternate titles: Immer Ärger mit den Lümmeln, a version reportedly shortened by roughly 10 minutes; and Entführung ins Chaos (Top Crack), a title used in later television broadcasts such as one schedule in 1989.

== See also ==
- List of Italian films of 1967
