= All My Friends Part 2 =

1982 Italian film by Mario Monicelli

My Friends — Act 2 (Amici miei – Atto II)
- Italian theatrical release poster
- Directed by: Mario Monicelli
- Written by: Leonardo Benvenuti; Piero De Bernardi; Tullio Pinelli; Mario Monicelli
- Produced by: Aurelio De Laurentiis; Luigi De Laurentiis
- Starring: Ugo Tognazzi; Gastone Moschin; Adolfo Celi; Renzo Montagnani; Paolo Stoppa; Philippe Noiret
- Cinematography: Sergio D'Offizi
- Edited by: Ruggero Mastroianni
- Music by: Carlo Rustichelli
- Distributed by: Filmauro
- Release date: 1982
- Running time: 125 minutes
- Country: Italy
- Language: Italian

My Friends — Act 2 (Italian: Amici miei – Atto II) is a 1982 Italian comedy film directed by Mario Monicelli. It is the sequel to Amici miei of 1975. The movie features Paolo Stoppa in one of his last roles. The last chapter of this saga is Amici miei – Atto III, directed by Nanni Loy (1985).

== The main characters and their characteristics ==
Pietro Germi, and then Monicelli, since the former had died without completing the film, wanted to propose on the big screen many of the typical aspects of Italian society of the middle classes. In the film there are all the elements that characterize the typical average Italian, or the trickster, the bungling, the passionate and what you hunt always in trouble. But one thing, more particular of the Tuscan spirit, unites all these facets: the jibe and the desire to live forever comic and cheerful adventures, sometimes creating one's own world. In fact, the "friends" of the film or the fallen Count Lello Mascetti, architect Rambaldo Melandri, journalist Giorgio Perozzi, bartender Guido Necchi and consultant Alfredo Sassaroli created a manner ideal for relaxing fun from morning to night, forgetting all the troubles, duties and problems that a normal man should take care of during the day.

The friends do not think, they just do it and have a great time as they can do, even inventing their own systems to make fun of people and ordinary citizens. The wives of some members are forced to endure the crap that the friends make up every day, sometimes very childish and silly. In particular, the wife of Mascetti, called Alice, being already in dire conditions of poverty by Raffaello, is even more desperate by the nonsense that commits with friends. In fact, often tries to kill himself with the gas left on. Giorgio Perozzi's wife, on the contrary, leaves him alone with his serious and mean son that does not think about anything but work. Between the two there is no communication since his wife and son can not conceive of the nonsense that Perozzi has with friends, instead of taking care of his son's future.

The so-called "gypsy days" ("zingarata") or travel and foolish actions mean that the aimless friends also make use of the famous gobbledygook ("supercazzola"). Count Mascetti's the best in making this prank of stopping a person and quickly saying a flurry of words and verbs with no logical connection or meaning for the other person, who remains baffled and confused in the face of what Mascetti says. In most cases, the other person is so upset by the play of the count, who believes he can not understand anything, and even the Italian language, or include places or names mentioned by Mascetti as a "stretcher", "area code" or "inspector wisps" and indicates the desired object, while remaining very surprised. Meanwhile, friends are laughing heartily and make the other person look like a moron.

Another characteristic element of the friends is teasing high alert as authorities or ministers of the church and especially invent scurrilous and vulgar songs from important symphonies such as The Barber of Seville. Consultant Sassaroli instead helps to save the day when the police or other people get angry, because he pretends to know all the magistrates of the city of Florence and most of the politicians in the area. Although the "carnival of illusions" of friends is bound to end one day, the cheerful and witty companions do not think a lot and always find a way to be happy, even in bad situations.

== Plot summary ==
The four old friends meet on the grave of the fifth of them, Giorgio Perozzi, who died at the end of the first episode. Putting a conversation in front of the tomb of his friend, Lello Mascetti, Guido Necchi, Rambaldo Melandri and Alpheus Sassaroli reminiscent of the great and exciting filth and jokes that made Giorgio Perozzi, the friend died of a heart attack. So the movie comes back from the Eighties to 1966 in Florence, when the wife of Perozzi was tired of his infidelities daily with eager baker's wife.

While Perozzi liked to put the horns to his wife and grow in the miserable son of Count Mascetti studio, since he did not want his feet while he enjoyed in his escapades, Melandri falls in love with a beautiful lady with a rich dowry. The two marry and friends continue to combine their trouble, and then the poor Rambaldo finds himself also to stage a performance of the Passion of Jesus because of the extreme religiosity of the new wife. His friends mock and then find themselves facing the terrible flood that hit the city in that year, making the overflow Arno. Beds, furniture and people floating through the old streets of the old town and the wife of Perozzi he discovers his wife clinging to the basket.

Returning to the present the four friends burst into laughter remember the details, but now they face the difficulties of the present. The minor child of Mascetti was impregnated by a crude and vulgar dishwasher and below is also haunted by debts to pay for the rental of the studio. He thinks to rely on a loan shark (Paolo Stoppa), but does nothing but accumulate its problems. Then the three friends involved in the rescue and Sassaroli, an expert surgeon, slimy man who pretends to have a problem with kidney stones. Thanks charade loan shark pay their money Sassaroli that lends them to the count Mascetti to pay the rent. Among the many adventures of Mascetti there is also that the sexual encounter with a Spanish dancer but was forced to leave quickly because he copulating with her in a luxurious room tree and does not know how to pay the bills. Also threatens to kill himself but in the end is too cowardly and reconsiders.

One day Mascetti finds himself talking about his noble origins, known as Florence since the year 1200, but my friends mock him, and the Count is angry because he, as much rich in what was youth, now finds himself almost begging. To the fury Mascetti is also affected by a heart attack that forced him to stay for the rest of his life in a wheelchair, but friends always find a way to keep him happy and continue to have fun with him in their gypsy.

== Cast ==
Actor	Portrayed
Ugo Tognazzi	Conte Lello Mascetti
Gastone Moschin	Rambaldo Melandri
Adolfo Celi	Professor Sassaroli
Renzo Montagnani	Guido Necchi
Milena Vukotic	Alice Mascetti
Fiorella Bucci	Melisenda Mascetti
Franca Tamantini	Carmen
Angela Goodwin	Laura Perozzi
Alessandro Haber	Widower
Domiziana Giordano	Noemi
Paolo Stoppa	Savino Capogreco
Yole Marinelli	Anita Esposito
Philippe Noiret	Giorgio Perozzi
Tommaso Bianco	Antonio Esposito, baker
Enio Drovandi	traffic policeman
Maurizio Scattorin	Luciano (as an adult)
Renato Cecchetto	Augusto Verdirame
Giovanni Nannini	the cemetery keeper
Anna Maria Torniai	Perozzi's mother-in-law
Carmen Elisabete Dias Da Silva	Twister

== See also ==
- List of Italian films of 1982
