= Franca Tamantini =

Italian film, television and stage actress

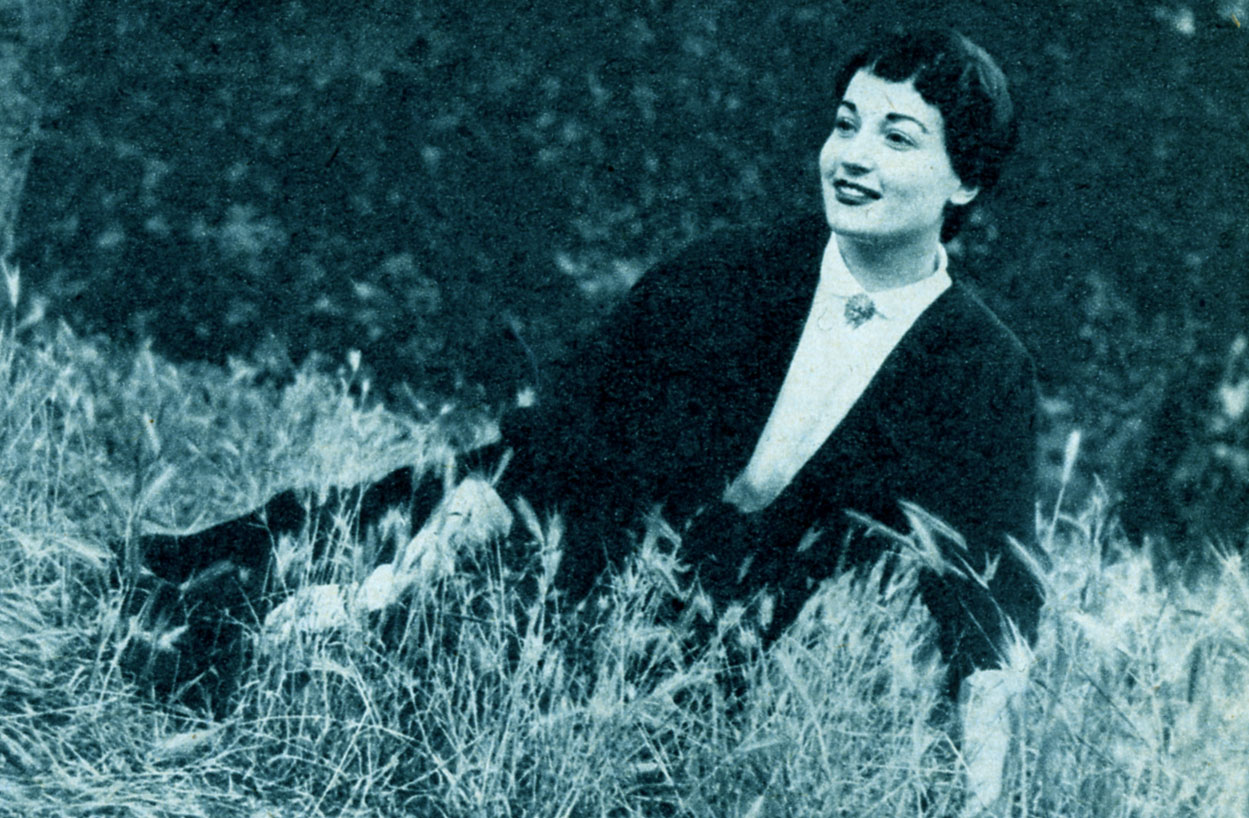
- Born: 24 August 1931; Rome, Italy
- Died: 11 August 2014 (aged 82); Rome, Italy
- Occupation: Actress

Franca Tamantini (24 August 1931 – 11 August 2014) was an Italian film, television and stage actress.

== Life and career ==
Born in Rome, since young age Tamantini studied piano, singing and classical dance at the Teatro dell'Opera di Roma. In 1948 she was chosen by Luchino Visconti to play Olimpia in the stage drama Rosalinda o come vi piace, and one year later she made her film debut in Fernando Cerchio's Cenerentola, a musical adaptation of the Charles Perrault's fairy tale Cinderella.

During her career Tamantini was often cast in operettas and musical comedies, both in the theater and in television. In films, she was often cast in character roles, and she enjoyed a late success only at mature age, with the role of Miss Necchi in the Amici Miei film series.

== Filmography ==
Year	Title	Role	Notes
1946	Biraghin		
1949	Cenerentola	Tisbe, stepsister of Cenerentola	
1949	Femmina incatenata		
1950	Toto Looks for a Wife	Luisella	
1950	Figaro Here, Figaro There	Elsa	
1951	Tomorrow Is Another Day	Lola	
1951	Song of Spring		
1951	Revenge of the Pirates	Conchita	
1951	The Young Caruso	Carragi - Soprano	
1951	I due derelitti	Colette	
1951	Trieste mia!		
1951	Auguri e figli maschi!	Vinicio Paciottini's Lover	
1952	The City Stands Trial	Carmela	
1952	The Queen of Sheba	The False Mother	
1952	Sunday Heroes	Annetta - the postcards seller	
1952	Una croce senza nome		
1952	La sonnambula	Lisa	
1952	La favorita	Ines	
1953	Frine, Courtesan of Orient	schiava di Frine	
1953	Dieci canzoni d'amore da salvare	Giovanna	
1954	Barrier of the Law		
1954	Due soldi di felicità	Alba Dores, soubrette	
1955	Le vacanze del sor Clemente	Tamara	
1955	Sultana Safiyè		
1956	Rigoletto e la sua tragedia	Maddalena	
1957	Un angelo è sceso a Brooklyn	Alfonso's Girlfriend	
1961	Pesci d'oro e bikini d'argento		
1962	The Police Commissioner	Marisa	
1962	I motorizzati	Rita	
1963	I terribili 7	Moglie Del Tramviere	
1975	My Friends	Carmen	
1981	Help Me Dream	Tonina	
1982	All My Friends Part 2	Carmen Necchi	
1983	Deadly Circuit	Signora Comolli	
1985	Amici miei – Atto III	Carmen Necchi	
1998	The Second Wife		
