= Eye of the Cat (1975 film) =

1975 Italian comedy film

- Directed by: Alberto Bevilacqua
- Written by: Alberto Bevilacqua; Nino Manfredi
- Starring: Nino Manfredi; Mariangela Melato; Eli Wallach; Enzo Cannavale
- Cinematography: Alfio Contini
- Edited by: Sergio Montanari
- Music by: Ennio Morricone; Clément Janequin
- Release date: 1975
- Country: Italy
- Language: Italian

Eye of the Cat (Italian: Attenti al buffone, lit. 'Beware the Fool') is a 1975 Italian comedy-drama film written and directed by Alberto Bevilacqua.

== Plot ==
Ras is a ruler or dictator who covets another man's wife as his own. He gets what he wants, but Ras wants more: in this case, to humiliate Marcello, a dedicated musician whose life he has already ruined by leaving his cat and taking his wife. He forces Marcello to seek an annulment to his marriage through the Vatican. Ras gets everything, but Marcello's wife, Giulia, and Marcello have other ideas.

== Cast ==
- Nino Manfredi as Marcello Ferrari
- Mariangela Melato as Giulia
- Eli Wallach as Cesare
- Enzo Cannavale as Lolo
- Francisco Rabal as the priest
- Mario Scaccia as Salomone
- Adriana Innocenti as Jolanda
- Franco Scandurra as the Butler
- Ettore Manni as Cesare's friend
- Erika Blanc as Margot
- Cristina Gajoni as a prostitute
- Loredana Bertè as a prostitute

== Production ==
The film is an adaptation of Bevilacqua's 1968 novel Occhio del gatto. It was shot in the spring of 1975.. The production was difficult, with Manfredi and Bevilacqua clashing to the point of physical confrontation.

== Reception ==
Released in December 1975, the film was a commercial success, grossing over 1,4 billion lire at the Italian box office. It was mostly badly received by critics, even if it won the David di Donatello for Best Screenplay.
