= The Devil's Nightmare =

1971 film

- Italian film poster
- Directed by: Jean Brismée
- Screenplay by: Patrice Rhomm
- Story by: Pierre-Claude Garnier (as Charles Lecocq); Patrice Rhomm
- Produced by: Pierre-Claude Garnier (as Charles Lecocq); Zeljko Kunkera; Claudio Rainis
- Starring: Erika Blanc; Ivana Novak; Jean Servais; Lorenzo Terzon; Shirley Corrigan; Daniel Emilfork
- Cinematography: André Goeffers
- Edited by: Panos Papakyriakopoulos
- Music by: Alessandro Alessandroni
- Production companies: Compagnie Europeenne Television et de Cinema; Delfino Film
- Distributed by: Ciné Vog Films (Belgium); Albatross Cinematografica (Italy)
- Release date: 14 November 1971
- Running time: 94 minutes
- Countries: Belgium; Italy
- Language: French
- Box office: $1,060,000

The Devil's Nightmare (French: La plus longue nuit du diable, lit. 'The Devil's Longest Night', Italian: La terrificante notte del demonio, lit. 'The Terrifying Night of the Demon') is a 1971 supernatural horror film directed by Jean Brismée and starring Erika Blanc, Jean Servais, Daniel Emilfork, and Lucien Raimbourg. Its plot follows a group of tourists who spend the night in a historic castle owned by a family plagued by curses and Satanism.

== Plot ==
Baron von Rhoneberg, a former World War II German general, sacrificed his daughter as the war ended. He did so because his family was placed under a terrible curse; the first-born female of every generation was to become a succubus. Many years later, he tells the story to a reporter who wishes to write an article about it and take pictures of his castle. However, the Baron opposes any photographs being taken. Despite his protests, the young woman goes up to visit the castle and takes pictures but is killed when a dry thunderstorm suddenly rolls in while she is in close proximity to it. Her body is taken back to the town, where it is discovered she has a burn in the shape of a cloven hoof on her arm, which is confirmed as the Mark of the Devil.

Sometime later, a group of tourists become stranded when the bridge they have to cross has been destroyed in a flood. They meet Satan in the guise of a strange-looking man who recommends that they take the ferry boat, but they arrive too late to catch the last ferry of the day. They are then directed to an old castle that offers room and board. When they arrive, one of the doors opens by itself, and a piece of the façade breaks off, nearly killing one of the tourists. Hans, the butler, greets them and shows them to their rooms, giving them a briefing of the history of three of the rooms, one of which bears the same cloven hoof mark on the floor tiles in front of the fireplace. After the guests have been accommodated to their rooms, Hans goes down to a laboratory basement and informs the Baron who is practicing alchemy. Over dinner, the Baron explains his family's history to his guests. His ancestor made a pact and sold his soul to the Devil in exchange for his services. Satan demanded that the eldest daughter of each generation become a succubus. When asked if he ever had a daughter, he shakes his head no.

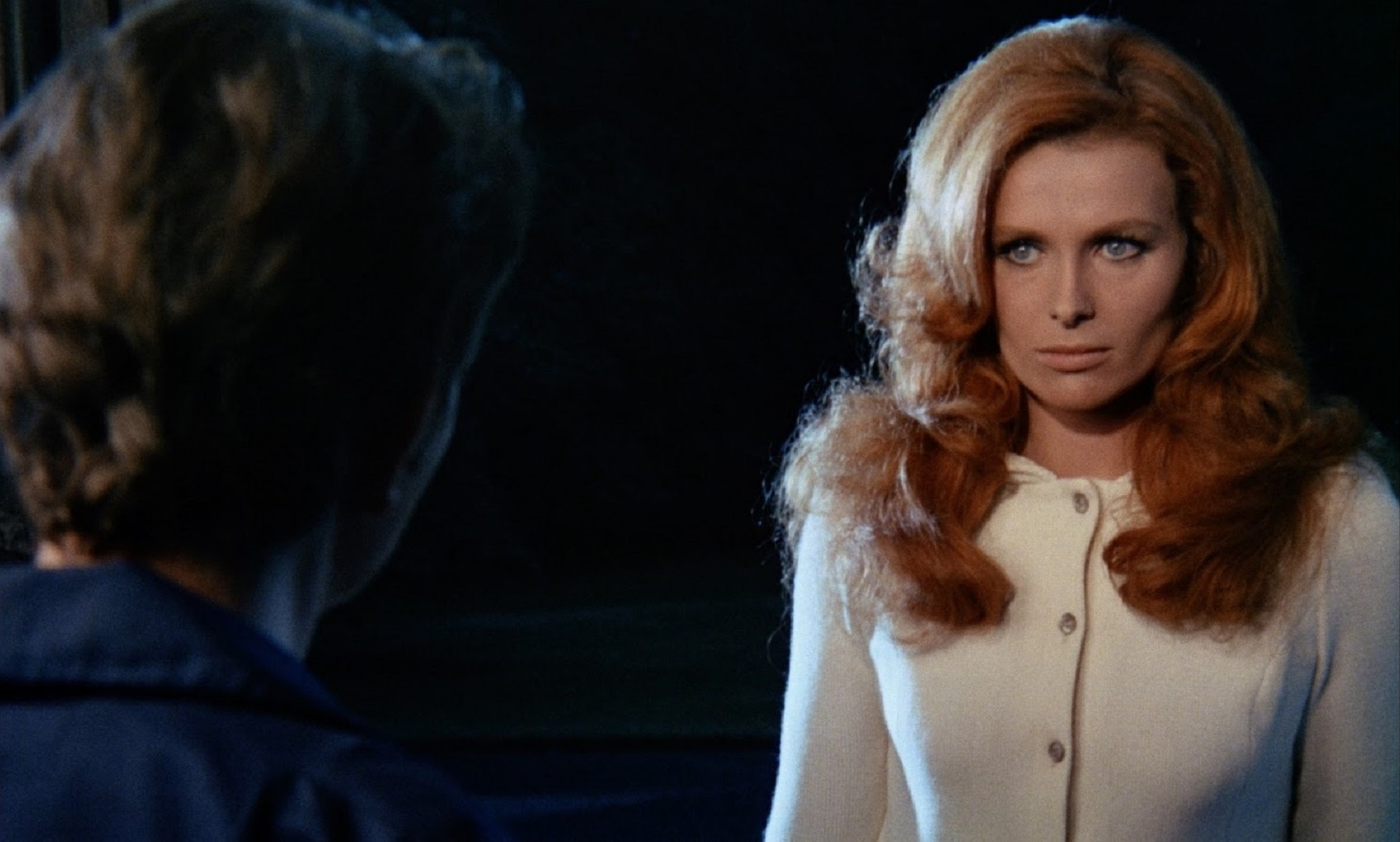
Lisa arriving at the castle

A young woman named Lisa Müller also comes to stay at the castle and proceeds to seduce each tourist according to their own personal weaknesses, then kills them, using their own sin against them. Each tourist is a representative of one of the Seven Deadly Sins. Matt Ducard represents Gluttony and dies by choking to death while gorging on food and wine. Nancy dies representing Greed by drowning in a hidden treasure hoard of powdered gold. Howard, representing Envy, is killed when he is guillotined, and Corrine, embodying Lust, is murdered when she is trapped inside an iron maiden while they are in the middle of an adulterous tryst. Short-tempered old Mr. Mason represents Wrath and dies when he is thrown out of a window and is impaled on an iron fence below. Regine dies as Sloth when a snake kills her in her sleep. Only the seminarian, Alvin Sorelle as Pride, seems immune to Lisa's seductive charms. He uses his cross to burn her face, causing her to retreat. At that point, Satan appears and tells Lisa that he will take care of Alvin. Satan follows Alvin to the chapel, where Alvin finds sanctuary. The devil says he will wait for him. Alvin offers him a bargain instead: He says Satan can have his soul if he releases the souls of his travelling companions. Satan agrees, and gives Alvin a contract to sign. Using a dagger, he cuts a cross in his wrist and uses the blood to sign the contract, which immediately bursts into flames.

The next morning, Alvin awakes to find the dead tourists eating breakfast before they set out to continue their trip, as though the previous night's events had never happened. Alvin tells them he had a dream about a succubus. The Baron is then wounded in a fencing accident with Hans, and Alvin waits with him for an ambulance. The Baron confesses to Alvin that he had lied; he did have a daughter and killed her in her cradle. After a conversation with Martha, the housekeeper, Alvin learns that the child the Baron stabbed was not the succubus. Lisa is Martha's daughter from an affair with the Baron's brother, Rudolph von Rhoneberg, and Lisa is the eldest daughter. Alvin dismisses Martha's claims, saying that there is no such thing as a succubus. Alvin chooses to remain at the castle with Lisa while the other tourists go on. However, when he visits the chapel again, he sees the burnt remains of the contract along with the blood-stained dagger. As Alvin and Lisa watch the tour bus heading back to the main road, the bus suddenly swerves to miss a funeral wagon driven by Satan and goes over a cliff, killing everyone aboard. Lisa thrusts herself into Alvin's arms. Lisa and Satan smile at each other as her and Alvin's embrace becomes sensual.

== Cast ==
- Erika Blanc as Lisa Müller
- Jean Servais as Baron von Rhoneberg
- Daniel Emilfork as Satan
- Lucien Raimbourg as Mason
- Jacques Monseau as Father Alvin Sorel (as Jacques Monseu)
- Colette Emmanuelle as Nancy
- Ivana Novak as Corinne
- Shirley Corrigan as Regine
- Frédérique Hender as Nurse
- Lorenzo Terzon as Howard
- Christian Maillet as Ducha
- Maurice De Groote as Hans (as Maurice Degroot)

== Release ==
The Devil's Nightmare was released theatrically in Belgium on 14 November 1971. In the United States, the film was acquired by Hemisphere Pictures, who released it regionally in October 1972, with drive-in screenings in San Francisco and Ogden, Utah. In England, the film was released on 5 November 1972. The film was released in the United States again in 1974, screening as part of a triple-feature in Los Angeles with In the Devil's Garden (1971) and The Devil's Wedding Night (1973).

It had several alternative titles in English-speaking territories, including The Devil Walks at Midnight, Succubus, Vampire Playgirls, Satan's Playthings, and Castle of Death.

=== Critical reception ===
Author Howard Hughes described it as an apparently cheaply produced but "effective modern gothic". On the other hand, Allmovie wrote the film "is steeped in spooky atmosphere", but "has little else to offer."

Linda Gross of the Los Angeles Times noted that the "succuba is well played by beautiful Erika Blanc, who looks a lot like Raquel Welch," adding that the film's makeup is "outstanding."

=== Home media ===
Image Entertainment released The Devil's Nightmare on DVD in 1998 under their "Redemption" series. Mondo Macabro issued a Blu-ray of the film in 2019 featuring a new 2K restoration.

== Related works ==
=== Novelization ===
The film's screenwriter Patrice Rondard, who frequently used the pseudonym Patrice Rhomm for his literary and cinema industry work, also wrote a novelization entitled Au service du Diable. The 216-page French language paperback was published by Galliera in April, 1971 to coincide with the film's European theatrical release. Galliera issued the book as the first volume in their Bibliothèque de l'étrange (Strange Library) series, and it features a full color illustration on the paper cover depicting Erika Blanc and Daniel Emilfork as their respective characters that is moderately different from the artwork used for theatrical release posters.

=== Remake ===
Dave Zagorski filmed a remake in 2012 under the Mad Z Productions banner (the US remake of the film). Devanny Pinn and Seregon O'Dassey starred in the film.

== Sources ==
- Hughes, Howard (2011). Cinema Italiano - The Complete Guide From Classics To Cult. London - New York: I.B.Tauris. ISBN 978-1-84885-608-0.
- Paul, Louis (2011). Italian Horror Film Directors. Jefferson, North Carolina: McFarland. ISBN 978-0-786-48749-3.
