= Long Arm of the Godfather =

1972 film

- Film poster
- Directed by: Nardo Bonomi
- Written by: Giulio Berruti; Nardo Bonomi
- Starring: Adolfo Celi
- Cinematography: Silvio Fraschetti
- Edited by: Giulio Berruti
- Music by: Silvano D'Auria
- Release date: 11 August 1972
- Running time: 90 minutes
- Country: Italy
- Language: Italian

Long Arm of the Godfather (Italian: La mano lunga del padrino) is a 1972 Italian crime film directed by Nardo Bonomi and starring Adolfo Celi.

== Plot ==
Vincenzo, known as "Raffica," is a young mobster who steals a shipment of rifles worth 200 million lire from Don Carmelo, a powerful organized crime boss. While waiting to finalize a deal for the weapons, Vincenzo hides in a hotel, but he is eventually tracked down by Don Carmelo's henchmen following a betrayal by his lover, Carmela.

After fighting them off, Vincenzo coordinates with his friend Tom, a mechanic, to sell the arms to an Arab businessman. While Vincenzo goes to meet his girlfriend, Sabina, Don Carmelo raids Tom's workshop where the weapons are hidden. He replaces most of the rifles with scrap iron, intending for the Arab businessman to kill the boy once the trap is discovered.

However, the trap fails, and Don Carmelo attempts to stop Vincenzo from collecting the 200 million lire. During a high-speed pursuit, the boss kills Sabina. Vincenzo manages to avenge her by killing Don Carmelo, but the boat he uses for his escape eventually sinks, forcing him to say goodbye to his dreams of wealth.

== Cast ==
- Adolfo Celi as Don Carmelo
- Peter Lee Lawrence as Vincenzo
- Erika Blanc as Sabina
- Kim Dimon
- Henriette Kok
- Riccardo Petrazzi as Don Carmelo Henchman
- Claudio Ruffini as Tom
- Piera Moretti
- Attilio Pelegatti
- Pietro Torrisi as Gallo
- Bruno Boschetti
