= The Last Good Time =

- Directed by: Bob Balaban
- Written by: Bob Balaban; John McLaughlin; Richard Bausch (novel)
- Produced by: Dean Silvers; Bob Balaban
- Starring: Armin Mueller-Stahl; Olivia d'Abo; Maureen Stapleton; Lionel Stander; Adrian Pasdar; Kevin Corrigan; Beatrice Winde
- Cinematography: Claudia Raschke
- Edited by: Hughes Winborne
- Music by: Jonathan Tunick
- Distributed by: The Samuel Goldwyn Company
- Release date: October 28, 1994 (HIFF)
- Running time: 90 minutes
- Country: United States
- Language: English
- Box office: $65,081

The Last Good Time is a 1994 American drama film starring Armin Mueller-Stahl, Olivia d'Abo, Maureen Stapleton and Lionel Stander in his final theatrical role. Directed by Bob Balaban, the film was based on a 1984 novel of the same name by Richard Bausch.

== Plot summary ==
The film opens showing a small New York City apartment building at night, where a young couple on the top floor are seen arguing. Charlotte (d'Abo) throws a bag out of her window, with some contents landing on the window sill of downstairs neighbor Joseph (Mueller-Stahl). Joseph takes some of the items, which includes a locker key, and by the next day, Charlotte and her boyfriend Eddie (Adrian Pasdar) have apparently vacated the premises.

Focus is then shifted towards Joseph, a widowed German/Jewish violinist who lives a simple yet structured everyday routine that includes writing in a journal about what he will wear, visiting Howard (Stander), an old friend at a nursing home who is in the final stages of Alzheimer's disease, trying to make arrangements on a tax debt, buying food at a discount grocery store, and then returning home to read books and play his violin.

Charlotte returns to the apartment the following evening to recover missing contents from her bag, but notices her boyfriend's car pull up while doing so and quickly rushes into the building. She asks Joseph for a towel to dry off after the heavy rain, but subsequently collapses on his apartment floor. He gives her a blanket and pillow and lets her sleep there.

After some hesitation, Joseph lets Charlotte stay in his apartment indefinitely. Despite the age difference, the two slowly form a platonic bond; Joseph discusses his past violin career and interest in philosophers; Charlotte reveals that her now former boyfriend Eddie was involved in organized crime and that the relationship was purely for financial reasons. Charlotte is additionally impressed that Joseph – despite his age – could remember the words of philosophers, whereas her former boyfriend – a one-time musician – could barely remember "words to his own songs."

While the two opposites slowly forge a more intimate relationship, matters begin to change dramatically for Joseph – due to tax collectors, he is forced to withdraw his life savings of $6000 from his bank account; his old friend Howard dies, and upon returning home with Charlotte from a bar one night, he finds his apartment ransacked, his violin smashed and his entire life savings stolen. Frank (Kevin Corrigan), Eddie's fellow gangster, had been following Charlotte around and traced her to Joseph's apartment. Joseph then gives Charlotte the missing locker key, the item Eddie and Frank were looking for. Charlotte angrily asks Joseph why he had this all along but never gave it to her, and Joseph explains because he didn't want her to leave.

Joseph, back to being the lonely man he was before, slowly reconciles with his elderly neighbor Ida (Stapleton), who he introduced to Charlotte and Howard, but had also been unfriendly towards for being too inquisitive about his life.

Charlotte returns a few days later informing Joseph she sold the locker key to one of Eddie's criminal associates for $7000. She gives Joseph $6000 of that money – the sum Joseph lost – and keeps the remaining $1000 for herself to start her life over, claiming she knows a friend in the city who owes her a favor. The two kiss and say goodbye.

The same morning, Joseph knocks on Ida's door and asks if she would like to accompany him on a NYC ferry the next day. Ida is interested, and Joseph agrees to pick her up the next morning.

== Critical response ==
The limited release indie film received a plurality of positive reviews from critics, earning a "89% Fresh" rating at Rotten Tomatoes.

Additionally, the film won awards at France's Avignon Film Festival and Long Island's Hamptons International Film Festival.
