= Don Fanucci =

Fictional character from The Godfather series

- Gastone Moschin as Don Fanucci
- First appearance: The Godfather
- Last appearance: The Godfather Part II
- Created by: Mario Puzo
- Portrayed by: Gastone Moschin

In-universe information
- Nickname: "Don Fanucci"
- Gender: Male
- Occupation: Extortioner, mobster
- Family: Black Hand

Don Fanucci is a fictional character appearing in Mario Puzo's 1969 novel The Godfather and the 1974 film The Godfather Part II, a sequel to the 1972 film version of Puzo's novel. Fanucci is portrayed by Gastone Moschin and is based on the personality of Ignazio Lupo, a real-life Black Hand figure. While ostensibly Sicilian, Don Fanucci dresses and carries himself in a manner reminiscent of the mostly Neapolitan guappo criminal subculture.

== In the original novel and The Godfather Part II ==
Fanucci is a notorious Black Hand extortionist who is the padrone of Little Italy. He supports himself by demanding and collecting protection money from neighborhood businesses. Vito Corleone (Robert De Niro) witnesses Fanucci threatening to disfigure a young girl when her father refuses to pay him and is about to intervene when he is stopped by his friend, Genco Abbandando, who tells him who Fanucci really is. Vito also loses his job as a grocery clerk when Fanucci strong-arms Genco's father into employing his nephew.

In the novel and in The Godfather Saga, the film adaptation re-edited for television, Vito witnesses an attack on Fanucci by three young men who are tired of Fanucci's oppression over the neighborhood. Although Fanucci screams for help, nobody comes to his rescue and the youths rob him, slash his throat, and leave him for dead. Vito knows from his own experiences that a real Don would never travel anywhere without bodyguards, nor would anyone dare to attack him in public for fear of retaliation. Vito begins to suspect that Fanucci's power comes from the threat of force rather than force itself.

One day, while Vito is driving a load of stolen merchandise, Fanucci suddenly jumps onto the moving vehicle. He explains how he knows that Vito, Peter Clemenza (Bruno Kirby), and Sal Tessio (John Aprea) have committed several robberies and are now trying to fence the stolen goods. He demands that Vito and his friends "wet my beak" by giving him a cut of $200 each from the three men. While he is willing to take less if his estimations of the cargo's value are wrong, he threatens to report Vito to the police if his demands are not met. This confirms Vito's suspicions that Fanucci is not as powerful as he claims, since a real Don would not get the police involved in his business unless he had no other way to enforce his will.

Vito assures Fanucci that he will convince his friends to pay him. That night, Vito meets with Clemenza and Tessio over dinner and expresses hesitations about paying Fanucci. They both tell Vito that they must pay, and when Vito mentions that he knows two bookies across town who don't pay Fanucci anything, Tessio and Clemenza insist that someone else must collect from them for Fanucci's boss, the powerful and feared Black Hand leader Maranzalla, who is the true power behind the Don. Vito then tells Clemenza and Tessio that he plans to get Fanucci to take less money, intending to "make him an offer he don't refuse." Vito meets with Fanucci but offers only $100. Impressed with the young man's courage, Fanucci tells Vito he will find him work in his organization for good money. Vito is now convinced Fanucci is all talk.

After the meeting, Vito follows Fanucci through the Feast of Saint Roch and then, via the rooftops, to his apartment down the street. Letting himself in through a rooftop doorway, he descends to Fanucci's apartment and partially unscrews a lightbulb to hide his presence. When Fanucci arrives and fixes the bulb, Vito shoots him three times, the sounds of gunfire masked by the carnival outside and by a rolled-up towel Vito uses as a makeshift silencer. After completing the hit, Vito retrieves the money that Fanucci had taken earlier, smashes the gun into pieces, dumps them down several chimneys on the rooftop of Fanucci's apartment building, and returns unnoticed to the Feast.

Since the hit was carried out on Vito's own initiative and because he was the only one of the three not cowed by Fanucci, Vito moves from being equal partners with Tessio and Clemenza to being the uncontested boss of their operation. Vito, with Abbandando, Clemenza and Tessio as his lieutenants, takes over Fanucci's rackets in the neighborhood. He treats the neighborhood with a great deal more respect than Fanucci had, and soon earns his neighbors' loyalty. Since Fanucci was not well-liked by the police, his murder is not properly investigated and is eventually written off as an assassination committed by a rival gangster. Owing to his clean record, Vito is never suspected, though the common knowledge that he is responsible for Fanucci's death increases his reputation for toughness when it is needed.

He opens a legitimate business, Genco Olive Oil Company (named after Abbandando), to serve as a front for their growing illegal dealings. Using Fanucci's rackets as the foundation, he organizes his growing criminal interests as the Corleone crime family, with Abbandando as his consigliere and Clemenza and Tessio as caporegimes.

Unbeknownst to Vito, his young son Sonny witnesses his father on the rooftop of Fanucci's apartment seconds after the Don's murder. Vito later learns this after Sonny reveals it to him at age 16 after being nearly caught by the police for armed robbery. It is this revelation that results in Sonny becoming a formal member of the Corleone crime family. This is not mentioned in the film, however.

== Influences ==
Fanucci is primarily based on Ignazio Lupo, a real-life Black Hand practitioner and member of the Morello crime family; his boss Maranzalla is likely a reference to Giuseppe Morello, a prominent figure in the early days of the New York Mafia. Another possible inspiration for Fanucci is Giosuè Gallucci, an Italian-American political and crime boss who, like Fanucci, was known to wear expensive suits while collecting money extorted from businesses and civilians in New York's Italian quarter, and who was also murdered in a shooting committed by rival gangsters.
