= Adored (film) =

- Directed by: Marco Filiberti
- Written by: Marco Filiberti; Italo Moscati
- Starring: Marco Filiberti
- Cinematography: Stefano Pancaldi
- Edited by: Valentina Girodo
- Release date: 2003
- Language: Italian

Adored (Italian: Poco più di un anno fa - Diario di un pornodivo, also known as Little More Than a Year Ago, Adored: Diary of a Male Porn Star and Adored: Diary of a Porn Star) is a 2003 Italian drama film written, directed and starred by Marco Filiberti.

It was screened in the Panorama section at the 2003 Berlin Film Festival.

== Plot ==
Life events of Riccardo Soldani aka Riki, a gay pornstar in the nineties, through the eyes of his brother.

== Cast ==
- Marco Filiberti: Riccardo Soldani
- Urbano Barberini: Federico Soldani
- Rosalinda Celentano: Luna
- Francesca D'Aloja: Charlotte
- Erika Blanc: Angela
- Luigi Diberti: Rod Lariani
- Caterina Guzzanti: Koka
- Alessandra Acciai: Julie
- Cosimo Cinieri: Silvio Valle
- Giuliana Calandra: Franca Soldani
- Franco Oppini: Gigi Ralli

== See also ==
- List of Italian films of 2003
