= Hey Boy (film) =

1948 film

Hey Boy Proibito rubare
- Directed by: Luigi Comencini
- Written by: Aldo Buzzi; Suso Cecchi d'Amico; Luigi Comencini; Armando Curcio; Gigi Martello
- Produced by: Gigi Martello; Carlo Ponti
- Starring: Adolfo Celi
- Cinematography: Aldo Tonti
- Edited by: Adriana Novelli
- Music by: Nino Rota
- Release date: 10 September 1948
- Running time: 85 minutes
- Country: Italy
- Language: Italian

Hey Boy (Italian: Proibito rubare), also known as No Stealing and Guagilo, is a 1948 Italian drama film directed by Luigi Comencini and starring Adolfo Celi.

== Plot ==
A missionary on his way to Africa has his suitcase stolen in Naples. While trying to locate it, he comes to realise the suffering and poverty in the city, and decides his work is needed there.

== Cast ==
- Carlo Barbieri
- Adolfo Celi as Don Pietro
- Antonio Cirelli
- Carlo Della Posta
- Luigi Demastro
- Clemente De Michele
- Luigi Dermasti
- Il Duca di Civitelli
- Ettore G. Mattia as himself
- Tina Pica as Maddalena, la cuoca
- Giovanni Rinaldi
- Mario Russo as Peppinello
