= A Man for Emmanuelle =

Italian drama film

- Italian film poster for A Man for Emmanuelle
- Directed by: Cesare Canevari
- Screenplay by: Cesare Canevari; Giuseppe Mangione
- Based on: Disintegrazione '68 by Graziella Di Prospero
- Starring: Erika Blanc
- Cinematography: Claudio Catozzo
- Music by: Gianni Ferrio
- Production company: Profima Cinematografica
- Release date: 1969
- Running time: 96 minutes
- Country: Italy

A Man for Emmanuelle (Italian: Io, Emmanuelle) is an Italian drama film directed by Cesare Canevari and starring Erika Blanc.

== Cast ==
- Erika Blanc as Emmanuelle
- Adolfo Celi as Sandro
- Paolo Ferrari as Raffaello
- Milla Sannoner as Ginette
- Sandro Korso as Writer
- Ben Salvador as Hippy

== Production ==
The film was based on the short story Disintegrazione '68 by Graziella Di Prospero.

== Reception ==
In a contemporary review, the Monthly Film Bulletin described the film as having "all the visual clichés associated with directors like Lelouch and Albicocco (sudden focus changes, elaborate zooming on to flower pots and such)" and that "the tone is so monotonous and risible, however, that any intended serious comment is lost in a welter of cheap effects".
