= Stanza 17-17 palazzo delle tasse, ufficio imposte =

- Directed by: Michele Lupo
- Written by: Sergio Donati; Vittorio Metz
- Starring: Gastone Moschin
- Cinematography: Guglielmo Mancori
- Music by: Armando Trovajoli
- Release date: 1971
- Country: Italy
- Language: Italian

Stanza 17-17 palazzo delle tasse, ufficio imposte (translation: "Room 17-17, income taxes palace, tax office") is a 1971 Italian heist comedy film directed by Michele Lupo.

== Plot ==
Paduan architect Giambattista Manteghin, actor Romolo Moretti, Prince Pantegani and inventor Leonardo Rossi meet while trying to bribe a tax official out of paying exorbitant taxes. The four get together and conspire to rob the taxation office building, which happens to have been designed by Manteghin.

== Cast ==
- Gastone Moschin as Giambattista Manteghin
- Philippe Leroy as Romolo "Sartana" Moretti
- Lionel Stander as Katanga
- Franco Fabrizi as Prince Gondrano Pantegani del Cacco
- Raymond Bussières as Leonardo Rossi
- Carlo Pisacane as Colgate
- Ugo Tognazzi as Ugo La Strizza
- Tano Cimarosa as Police Commissioner
- Joyce Geraldine Stewart as Prostitute
- Ernesto Colli as Parking Attendant
- John Karlsen as Strongbox Seller

== Reception ==
The film received mixed reviews in Italy at the time of its release.
