= The Moving Finger (film) =

- Directed by: Larry Moyer
- Written by: Carlo Fiore; Larry Moyer
- Produced by: Larry Mover
- Starring: Lionel Stander
- Music by: Shel Silverstein; Teddy Vann
- Production company: Larry Moyer Associates
- Release date: 1963
- Running time: 100 mins
- Country: United States
- Language: English
- Budget: less than $100,000

The Moving Finger is a 1963 American film.

== Premise ==
Anatol runs a Greenwich Village coffee house and lets beatniks, including underage actress Angel, sleep in his basement. They let the wounded survivor of a bank holdup hide out there, planning to keep his money.

== Cast ==
- Lionel Stander as Anatole
- Barbara London as Angel
- Wendy Barrie
- Art Smith as a drunken doctor
- Barry Newman as the head beatnik
- Gary Goodrow
- Alan Ansara

== Production ==
The film is a comedy that was produced with money from private sources; filming took 16 months and was finished by September 1963.

The working title was Better Than Money.

Moyer made the film as a non-union production which led him to have troubles with the East Coast Motion Picture Council. This hurt the ability of the film to be screened.

== Reception ==
The film won Best Director at the San Francisco Film Festival. Sight and Sound called it "pointless American new wavery set in Greenwich Village with wounded bank robber sheltering among the beatniks, hand-held camera and atrocious dubbing."

Variety wrote "New York-made indie’s original idea was to combine Crime and Punishment with The Subterraneans and Violent Saturday. But... the action got mired down in’ some weak writing,- misguided direction and bad acting. Every time a flame of originality flares up, it is promptly snuffed out."

According to a retrospective review, "Mixing Pull My Daisy with The Treasure of (the) Sierra Madre, Moyer (who was named Best Director at the San Francisco Film Fest) captures a crude spontaneity amongst the characters, while cinematographer Max Glenn's hand-held camera adds realism, right down to a wonderfully-cynical San Gennaro Festival climax (where it's obvious the crowd didn't even realize they were in a movie). Sprinkled with tacky Beat performance art, music and all-too-authentic weirdos, this is no classic, but certainly offers a finger-snapping dose of nostalgia on a shoestring budget."
