= Adolfo Celi =

Italian actor and director (1922–1986)

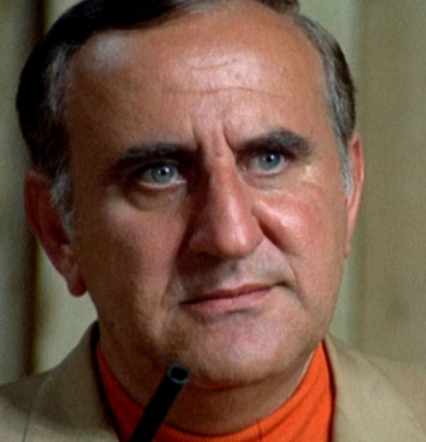
- Celi in La mala ordina (1972)
- Born: 27 July 1922; Curcuraci, Sicily, Kingdom of Italy
- Died: 19 February 1986 (aged 63); Siena, Tuscany, Italy
- Occupations: Actor; singer
- Years active: 1946–1985
- Spouses: Tônia Carrero (m. 1951; div. 1962) Marília Branco (m. 1963, divorced) Veronica Lazăr (m. 1966)
- Children: 2, including Alessandra

Adolfo Celi (Italian pronunciation: [aˈdɔlfo ˈtʃɛːli]; 27 July 1922 – 19 February 1986) was an Italian film actor and director. Born in Curcuraci, Messina, Sicily, Celi appeared in nearly 100 films. Although a prominent actor in Italian cinema and famed for many roles, he is best remembered internationally for his portrayal of Emilio Largo in the 1965 James Bond film Thunderball. Celi later spoofed his Thunderball role in the film OK Connery (aka Operation Double 007) opposite Sean Connery's brother, Neil Connery.

== Life and career ==
Celi became a film actor in post-war Italy. He left the Italian film industry when he emigrated to Brazil where he co-founded the Teatro Brasileiro de Comédia along with the Brazilian stage greats Paulo Autran and Tônia Carrero in São Paulo. He was successful as a stage actor in Argentina and Brazil. He directed three films in South America in the 1950s, including the Brazilian hit Tico-Tico no Fubá in 1952.

Celi began a new popular career when he played the villain in Philippe de Broca's That Man from Rio, selected by de Broca on location in Rio de Janeiro. The popularity of the film led him to be cast as camp commandant Battaglia opposite Frank Sinatra and Trevor Howard's Allied POWs in the 1965 Second World War escape drama Von Ryan's Express. This led him to his most well-known role as Largo in Thunderball. He is also known to international audiences as Ralph Valmont, one of the villains in the Mario Bava action thriller Danger: Diabolik and the celebrated Fernando Di Leo's poliziottesco film Hired to Kill (La mala ordina, 1972) as Don Vito Tressoldi. Celi was considered for the part of Don Vito Corleone in The Godfather, which ultimately went to Marlon Brando.

Celi appeared as a protagonist in some Italian comedies, including Amici Miei and Brancaleone alle Crociate and did some television work, notably in mini-series Petrosino (1972), portraying the legendary Italian-American cop, and as the ruthless aristocrat, the Baron of Carini in another very popular mini-series, La Baronessa di Carini (1975).

In addition to his native languages Sicilian and Italian, Celi was fluent in several languages, including English, Spanish, French, German and Portuguese. Despite his proficiency in English, his heavy Sicilian accent meant that he was usually dubbed when he appeared in English language films; however, he was not dubbed in the 1981 BBC serial The Borgias, in which Celi played Rodrigo Borgia, with his thickly-accented English difficult for certain TV critics and viewers to understand.

== Personal life and death ==
Celi was married three times, including with Brazilian Tônia Carrero and Romanian Veronica Lazăr. His daughter Alessandra Celi, born to Lazăr, is also an actress. He died of a heart attack in Siena, Tuscany, in 1986.

== Filmography ==
- A Yank in Rome (Un americano in vacanza, 1946) as Tom
- Christmas at Camp 119 (Natale al campo 119, 1947) as John, il sergent americano
- Hey Boy (Proibito rubare, 1948)
- Immigrants (Emigrantes, 1948) as Il professore
- Caiçara (1950) as Genovés
- Tico-Tico no Fubá (1952) (uncredited)
- Sandokan the Great (Sandokan, la tigre di Mompracem, 1963) as James Brooke
- That Man from Rio (L'homme de Rio, 1964) as Mário de Castro
- Three Nights of Love (Tre notti d'amore, 1964)
- Male Companion (Un monsieur de compagnie, 1964) as Benvenuto
- Beautiful Families (1964) (segment "Amare è un po' morire") as Professore Della Porta
- Crime on a Summer Morning (Par un beau matin d'été, 1965) as Van Willie
- Von Ryan's Express (1965) as Major Battaglia
- The Agony and the Ecstasy (1965) as Giovanni de' Medici
- Slalom (1965) as Riccardo
- A Man Named John (E venne un uomo, 1965) as Msgr. Radini Tedeschi
- Thunderball (1965) as Emilio Largo
- El Greco (1966) as Don Miguel de Las Cuervas
- Yankee (1966) as Grande Concho
- Target for Killing (Das Geheimnis der gelben Mönche, 1966) as Henry Perkins
- Pleasant Nights (Le piacevoli notti, 1966) as Bernadozzo
- Grand Prix (1966) as Agostini Manetta
- King of Hearts (Le roi de coeur, 1966) as Colonel Alexander MacBibenbrook
- Dirty Heroes (Dalle Ardenne all'inferno, 1967) as Luc Rollman
- Master Stroke (Colpo maestro al servizio di Sua Maestà britannica, 1967) as Mr. Bernard
- The Honey Pot (1967) as Inspector Rizzi
- OK Connery (1967) as Mr. Thai – 'Beta'
- The Bobo (1967) as Francisco Carbonell
- Grand Slam (Ad ogni costo, 1967) as Mark Milfford
- Fantabulous Inc. (La Donna, il sesso e il superuomo, 1967) as Karl Maria van Beethoven
- Death Sentence (Sentenza di morte, 1968) as Friar Baldwin
- Seven Times Seven (Sette volte sette, 1968) as Warden
- Diabolik (1968) as Ralph Valmount
- It's Your Move (Uno scacco tutto matto, 1969) as Bayon / Guinet
- Alibi (L'alibi, 1969) as Adolfo
- Midas Run (1969) as General Ferranti
- Detective Belli (Un Detective, 1969) as Avvocato Fontana
- A Man for Emmanuelle (Io, Emmanuelle, 1969) as Sandri
- The Archangel (L'arcangelo, 1969) as Marco Tarrochi Roda
- In Search of Gregory (1969) as Max
- Death Knocks Twice (Blonde Köder für den Mörder, 1969) as Professor Max Spigler
- Rendezvous with Dishonour (Appuntamento col disonore, 1970) as Hermes
- Fragment of Fear (1970) as Signor Bardoni
- The Cop (Un condé, 1970) as Le Commissaire principal / Chief of police
- Brancaleone at the Crusades (Brancaleone alle crociate, 1970) as Re Boemondo
- Finale di partita (Alla ricerca di Gregory, 1970)
- They Have Changed Their Face (Hanno cambiato faccia, 1971) as Giovanni Nosferatu
- Una chica casi decente (1971) as César Martín de Valdés 'Duque'
- Murders in the Rue Morgue (1971) as Inspector Vidocq
- 1931: Once Upon a Time in New York (Piazza pulita, 1972) as The Pole
- Brother Sun, Sister Moon (Fratello sole, sorella luna, 1972) as Consul
- Eye in the Labyrinth (L'occhio nel labirinto, 1972) as Frank
- Who Killed the Prosecutor and Why? (Terza ipotesi su un caso di perfetta strategia criminale, 1972) as Inspector Vezzi
- Who Saw Her Die? (Chi l'ha vista morire?, 1972) as Serafian
- Naked Girl Killed in the Park (Ragazza tutta nuda assassinata nel parco, 1972) as Inspector Huber
- Long Arm of the Godfather (La mano lunga del padrino, 1972) as Don Carmelo
- Hired to Kill (La mala ordina, 1972) as Vito
- Hitler: The Last Ten Days (1973) as Gen. Krebs
- Le Mataf (Tre per una grande rapina, 1973) as Me Desbordes
- Black Holiday (La villeggiatura, 1973) as Commissioner Rizzuto
- The Devil Is a Woman (Il sorriso del grande tentatore, 1974) as Father Borrelli
- The Phantom of Liberty (Le Fantôme de la liberté, 1974) as Le docteur de Legendre / Doctor Pasolini
- And Then There Were None (Ein unbekannter rechnet ab, 1974) as Gen. André Salvé
- The Balloon Vendor (Il venditore di palloncini, 1974) as Dr. Monforte
- Libera, My Love (Libera, amore mio..., 1975) as Felice Valente – Libera's father
- My Friends (Amici miei, 1975) as Professor Sassaroli
- L'amaro caso della baronessa di Carini (1975) as Don Mariano D'Agrò
- Sandokan (1976) as James Brooke
- Live Like a Cop, Die Like a Man (Uomini si nasce poliziotti si muore, 1976) as Captain
- Pure as a Lily (Come una rosa al naso, 1976) as L'onorevole
- Confessions of a Frustrated Housewife (La moglie di mio padre, 1976) as Antonio Lenzini
- Goodnight, Ladies and Gentlemen (Signore e signori, buonanotte, 1976) as Vladimiro Palese
- The Next Man (1976) as Al Sharif
- The Big Operator (Le Grand escogriffe, 1976) as Rifai
- Merciless Man (Genova a mano armata, 1976) as Commissario Lo Gallo
- Febbre da cavallo (1976) as Judge
- Che notte quella notte! (1977)
- The Passengers (Les Passagers, 1977) as Boetani
- Pane, burro e marmellata (1977) as Aristide Bertelli
- Holocaust 2000 (1977) as Dr. Kerouac
- La tigre è ancora viva: Sandokan alla riscossa! (1977) as James Brooke
- Man of Corleone (L'uomo di Corleone, 1977)
- The Perfect Crime (Indagine su un delitto perfetto, 1978) as Sir Harold Boyd
- Professor Kranz tedesco di Germania (1978) as Carcamano
- Le braghe del padrone (1978) as Euginio – the president
- L'affittacamere (1979)
- Café Express (1980) as Ispettore capo Ministero
- Car-napping (1980) as Head of police in Palermo
- Madly in Love (Innamorato pazzo, 1981) as Gustavo VI di San Tulipe
- Perdóname, amor (1982) as Ruggero Rivelli
- Monsignor (1982) as Cardinal Vinci
- All My Friends Part 2 (Amici miei atto II, 1982) as Professor Sassaroli
- Cinderella '80 (1984) as Principe Goncalvo Gherardeschi
- Passaporto segnalato (1985) as Avvocato Santi
- All My Friends Part 3 (Amici miei atto III, 1985) as Professor Sassaroli
- Il giocatore invisibile (1985)
- Due assi per un turbo (1987) as Il Caposcalo
