= Lionel Stander =

American actor (1908–1994)

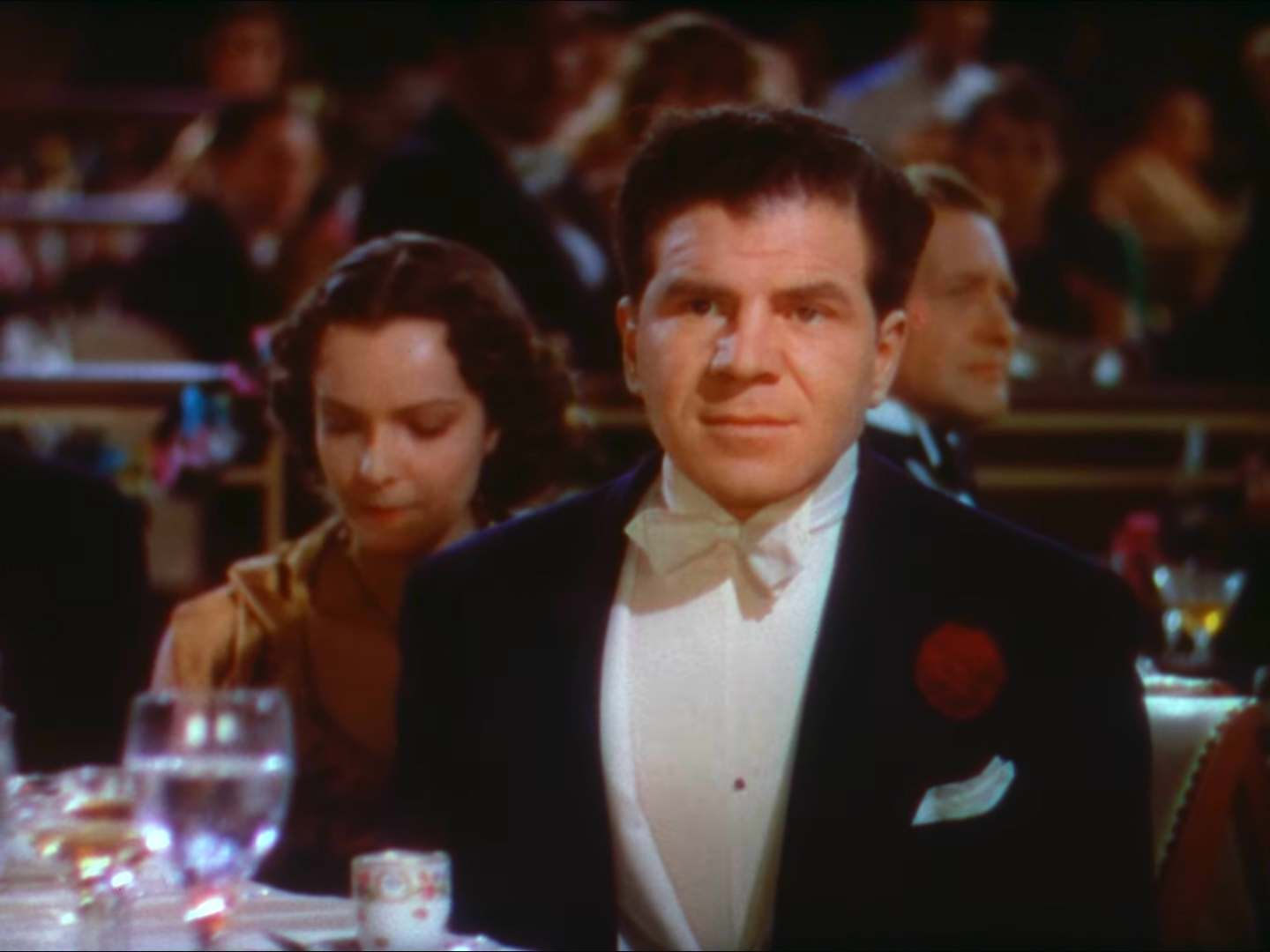
- Stander in A Star Is Born (1937)
- Born: Lionel Jay Stander; January 11, 1908; New York City, U.S.
- Died: November 30, 1994 (aged 86); Los Angeles, California, U.S.
- Occupation: Actor
- Years active: 1928–1994
- Spouses: Lucy Dietz (m. 1928; div. 1936) Alice Twitchell (m. 1938; div. 1942) Vehanne Monteagle (m. 1945; div. 1950) Diana Radbec (m. 1953; div. 1963) Maria Penn (m. 1963; div. 1967) Stephanie Van Hennick (m. 1971)
- Children: 6

Lionel Jay Stander (January 11, 1908 – November 30, 1994) was an American actor, activist, and a founding member of the Screen Actors Guild. He had an extensive career in theatre, film, radio, and television that spanned nearly 70 years, from 1928 until 1994. He was known for his distinctive raspy voice and tough-guy demeanor, as well as for his vocal left-wing political stances. One of the first Hollywood actors to be subpoenaed before the House Un-American Activities Committee, he was blacklisted from the late 1940s until the mid-1960s.

Following his experience with the Hollywood Blacklist, Stander moved to Europe, where he appeared in many genre films, including several Spaghetti Westerns. He returned to the United States later in the decade, playing the role of the majordomo Max on the 1980s mystery television series Hart to Hart, earning him a Golden Globe Award for Best Supporting Actor – Series, Miniseries or Television Film.

== Early life ==
Stander was born in The Bronx, New York City on 11 January 1908, to Louis and Bella Stander, parents of Russian Jewish extraction.

During his one year at the University of North Carolina at Chapel Hill, he appeared in the student productions The Muse of the Unpublished Writer, and The Muse and the Movies: A Comedy of Greenwich Village.

== Career ==
Stander's acting career began in 1928, as Cop and First Fairy in Him by E. E. Cummings, at the Provincetown Playhouse. He claimed that he got the roles because one of them required shooting craps, which he did well, and a friend in the company volunteered him. He appeared in a series of short-lived plays through the early 1930s, including The House Beautiful, which Dorothy Parker famously derided as "the play lousy".

=== Early film roles ===
Like many New York-based stage actors, Stander found additional work in movie short subjects filmed in New York. He signed with Vitaphone and was featured (without screen credit) in the two-reel comedy In the Dough (1933), with Roscoe Arbuckle and Shemp Howard. He made several other Vitaphone comedies, usually as a comic tough guy, villain, or authority figure; his last Vitaphone short was The Old Grey Mayor (1935) with Bob Hope in 1935. That same year, he was cast in a feature, Ben Hecht's The Scoundrel (1935), with Noël Coward. He moved to Hollywood and signed a contract with Columbia Pictures. Stander was in a string of films over the next three years, appearing most notably in Frank Capra's Mr. Deeds Goes to Town (1936) with Gary Cooper, Meet Nero Wolfe (1936) playing Archie Goodwin, The League of Frightened Men (1937), and A Star Is Born (1937) with Janet Gaynor and Fredric March.

=== Radio roles ===
Stander's distinctive rumbling voice, tough-guy demeanor, and talent with accents made him a popular radio actor. In the 1930s and 1940s, he was on The Eddie Cantor Show, Bing Crosby's KMH show, the Lux Radio Theater production of A Star Is Born, The Fred Allen Show, the Mayor of the Town series with Lionel Barrymore and Agnes Moorehead, Kraft Music Hall on NBC, Stage Door Canteen on CBS, the Lincoln Highway Radio Show on NBC, and The Jack Paar Show, among others.

In 1941, he starred in a short-lived radio show called The Life of Riley on CBS (no relation to the radio, film, and television character later made famous by William Bendix). Stander played the role of Spider Schultz in both Harold Lloyd's film The Milky Way (1936) and its remake ten years later, The Kid from Brooklyn (1946), starring Danny Kaye. He was a regular on Danny Kaye's zany comedy-variety radio show on CBS (1946–1947), playing himself as "just the elevator operator" amidst the antics of Kaye, future Our Miss Brooks star Eve Arden, and bandleader Harry James.

Also during the 1940s, he played several characters on The Woody Woodpecker and Andy Panda animated theatrical shorts, produced by Walter Lantz Productions. For Woody Woodpecker, he provided the voice of Buzz Buzzard, but was blacklisted from the Lantz studio in 1951 and was replaced by Dal McKennon.

=== Activism ===
Stander espoused a variety of social and political causes, and was a founding member of the Screen Actors Guild. At a SAG meeting held during a 1937 studio technicians' strike, he told the assemblage of 2000 members: "With the eyes of the whole world on this meeting, will it not give the Guild a black eye if its members continue to cross picket lines?" (The NY Times reported: "Cheers mingled with boos greeted the question.") Stander also supported the Conference of Studio Unions in its fight against the Mob-influenced International Alliance of Theatrical Stage Employees (IATSE). Also in 1937, Ivan F. Cox, a deposed officer of the San Francisco longshoremen's union, sued Stander and a host of others, including union leader Harry Bridges, actors Fredric March, Franchot Tone, Mary Astor, James Cagney, Jean Muir, and director William Dieterle. The charge, according to Time magazine, was "conspiring to propagate Communism on the Pacific Coast, causing Mr. Cox to lose his job".

During the Spanish Civil War, Stander fundraised for the Republican cause. He also campaigned for the release of the Scottsboro Boys. He was a member of the Popular Front from 1936 until 1939, and subsequently belonged to the Hollywood Anti-Nazi League. Regarding his political beliefs, Stander once described himself as "lefter than the Left" and said he supported the Communist Party USA prior to the Molotov–Ribbentrop Pact (which he opposed). As he later put it, "I worked very closely with the Communist Party during the ’30s. But I never joined."

In 1938, Columbia Pictures head Harry Cohn allegedly called Stander "a Red son of a bitch" and threatened a US$100,000 fine against any studio that renewed his contract. Despite critical acclaim for his performances, Stander's film work dropped off drastically. After appearing in 15 films in 1935 and 1936, he was in only six in 1937 and 1938. This was followed by just six films from 1939 through 1943, none made by major studios, the most notable being Guadalcanal Diary (1943).

=== Stander and HUAC ===
In 1940, Stander was among the first group of Hollywood actors to be subpoenaed before the House Un-American Activities Committee (HUAC) for supposed Communist activities. At a grand jury hearing in Los Angeles in August 1940—the transcript of which was leaked to the press—John L. Leech, the self-described former "chief functionary" of the L.A. Communist Party, named Stander as a CP member, along with more than 15 other Hollywood notables, including Franchot Tone, Humphrey Bogart, James Cagney, Luise Rainer, Clifford Odets and Budd Schulberg. Stander subsequently forced himself into the grand jury hearing, and the district attorney cleared him of the allegations.

Stander appeared in few films in 1944 and 1945. Then, with HUAC's attentions focused elsewhere due to World War II, he played in a number of mostly second-rate pictures from independent studios through the late 1940s. These include Ben Hecht's Specter of the Rose (1946); the Preston Sturges comedy The Sin of Harold Diddlebock (1947) with Harold Lloyd; and Trouble Makers (1948) with The Bowery Boys. One classic emerged from this period of his career, the Preston Sturges comedy Unfaithfully Yours (1948) with Rex Harrison.

In 1947, HUAC turned its attention once again to Hollywood. That October, Howard Rushmore, who had belonged to the CPUSA in the 1930s and written film reviews for the Daily Worker, testified that writer John Howard Lawson, whom he named as a Communist, had "referred to Lionel Stander as a perfect example of how a Communist should not act in Hollywood." Stander was again blacklisted from films, though he played on TV, radio, and in the theater.

In March 1951, actor Larry Parks, after pleading with HUAC investigators not to force him to "crawl through the mud" as an informer, named several people as Communists in a "closed-door session", which made the newspapers two days later. He testified that he knew Stander, but did not recall attending any CP meetings with him.

At a HUAC hearing in April 1951, actor Marc Lawrence named Stander as a member of his Hollywood Communist "cell", along with screenwriters Lester Cole and Gordon Kahn. Lawrence testified that Stander "was the guy who introduced me to the party line", and that Stander said that by joining the CP, he would "get to know the dames more" — which Lawrence, who did not enjoy film-star looks, thought a good idea. Upon hearing of this, Stander shot off a telegram to HUAC chair John S. Wood, calling Lawrence's testimony "ridiculous" and asking to appear before the Committee so that Stander could swear under oath he was not a Communist. The telegram concluded: "I respectfully request an opportunity to appear before you at your earliest possible convenience. Be assured of my cooperation." He also brought a slander lawsuit against Lawrence, which Stander later described in a 1983 interview:

I consulted a New York lawyer and sued Marc Lawrence in the state courts of New York, and the judge ruled that if he repeated what he had said on the stand away from the stand, I had a viable suit. But he enjoyed congressional immunity on the stand. Evidently, Marc Lawrence had a lawyer, too, because as soon as he finished making his statements, he left for Europe. That was it for the lawsuit.

After Lawrence's 1951 testimony, Stander was blacklisted from TV and radio. He continued to act in theater roles, and played Ludlow Lowell in the 1952-53 revival of Pal Joey on Broadway and on tour.

=== Blacklisting ===
Two years passed before Stander was issued the requested subpoena. Finally, in May 1953, he testified at a HUAC hearing in New York, where he made nationwide front-page headlines by being uproariously uncooperative, memorialized in the Eric Bentley play, Are You Now or Have You Ever Been. The New York Times headline was "Stander Lectures House Red Inquiry." In a dig at bandleader Artie Shaw, who had tearfully claimed in a Committee hearing that he had been "duped" by the Communist Party, Stander asserted:

"And I am not a dupe, or a dope, or a moe, or a schmoe, and everything I did—I was absolutely conscious of what I was doing, and I am not ashamed of everything I said in public or private; and I am proud of my war record, my private record as a citizen and my public record as an entertainer."

An excerpt from that statement was engraved in stone for "The First Amendment Blacklist Memorial" by Jenny Holzer at the University of Southern California.

Other notable statements during Stander's 1953 HUAC testimony:

- "[Testifying before HUAC] is like the Spanish Inquisition. You may not be burned, but you can't help coming away a little singed."
- "I don't know about the overthrow of the government. This committee has been investigating 15 years so far, and hasn't found one act of violence."
- "I know of a group of fanatics who are desperately trying to undermine the Constitution of the United States by depriving artists and others of life, liberty, and the pursuit of happiness without due process of law... I can tell names and cite instances and I am one of the first victims of it. And if you are interested in that and also a group of ex-fascists and America-Firsters and anti-Semites, people who hate everybody including Negroes, minority groups and most likely themselves... and these people are engaged in a conspiracy outside all the legal processes to undermine the very fundamental American concepts upon which our entire system of democracy exists."
- "...I don't want to be responsible for a whole stable of informers, stool pigeons, and psychopaths and ex-political heretics, who come in here beating their breast and say, 'I am awfully sorry; I didn't know what I was doing. Please--I want absolution; get me back into pictures.'"
- "My estimation of this committee is that this committee arrogates judicial and punitive powers which it does not possess."

Stander also denied having been a Communist "now or yesterday." But when asked if he had ever been a party member, he refused to answer, calling it "a trick question."

Stander was blacklisted from the late 1940s until 1965; perhaps the longest period.

=== Career in independent films in Europe ===
After that, Stander's acting career went into a free fall. He worked as a stockbroker on Wall Street, a journeyman stage actor, a corporate spokesman—even a New Orleans Mardi Gras king. He didn't return to Broadway until 1961 (and then only briefly in a flop) and to film in 1963, in the low-budget The Moving Finger (although he did provide, uncredited, the voice-over narration for the 1961 film noir Blast of Silence.)

Life improved for Stander when he moved to London in 1964 to act in Bertolt Brecht's Saint Joan of the Stockyards, directed by Tony Richardson, for whom he'd acted on Broadway, along with Christopher Plummer, in a 1963 production of Brecht's The Resistible Rise of Arturo Ui. In 1965, he was featured in the film Promise Her Anything. That same year Richardson cast him in the black comedy about the funeral industry, The Loved One, based on the novel by Evelyn Waugh, with an all-star cast including Jonathan Winters, Robert Morse, Liberace, Rod Steiger, Paul Williams and many others. In 1966, Roman Polanski cast Stander in his only starring role, as the thug Dickie in Cul-de-sac, opposite Françoise Dorléac and Donald Pleasence.

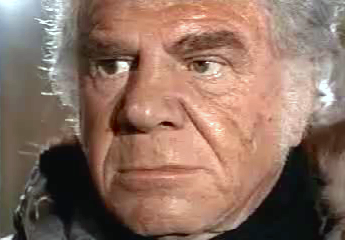
Stander in Stanza 17-17 (1971)

Stander stayed in Europe and eventually settled in Rome, where he appeared in many spaghetti Westerns, most notably playing a bartender named Max in Sergio Leone's Once Upon a Time in the West. He played the role of the villainous mob boss in Fernando Di Leo's 1972 poliziottesco thriller Caliber 9. In Rome he connected with Robert Wagner, who cast him in an episode of It Takes a Thief that was shot there. Stander's few English-language films in the 1970s include The Gang That Couldn't Shoot Straight with Robert De Niro and Jerry Orbach, Steven Spielberg's 1941, and Martin Scorsese's New York, New York, which also starred De Niro and Liza Minnelli.

Stander played a supporting role in the TV film Revenge Is My Destiny with Chris Robinson. He played a lounge comic modeled after the real-life Las Vegas comic Joe E. Lewis, who used to begin his act by announcing "Post Time" as he sipped his ever-present drink.

=== Hart to Hart and other roles ===
After 15 years abroad, Stander moved back to the U.S. for the role he is now most famous for: Max, the loyal butler, cook, and chauffeur to the wealthy, amateur detectives Jonathan and Jennifer Hart played by Robert Wagner and Stefanie Powers on the 1979–1984 television series Hart to Hart (and a subsequent series of Hart to Hart made-for-television films). In 1982, Stander won a Golden Globe Award for Best Supporting Actor – Series, Miniseries or Television Film.

In 1986, he became the voice of Kup in The Transformers: The Movie. In 1991 he was a guest star in the television series Dream On, playing Uncle Pat in the episode "Toby or Not Toby". His final theatrical film role was as a dying hospital patient in The Last Good Time (1994), with Armin Mueller-Stahl and Olivia d'Abo, directed by Bob Balaban.

== Personal life and death ==
Stander died of lung cancer at his home in Los Angeles, California, in 1994 at age 86.

== Filmography ==
Title	Year	Role	Notes
In the Dough	1933	Toots	Short, uncredited
The Scoundrel	1935	Rothenstien	
Hooray for Love	1935	Chowsky	
We're in the Money	1935	Leonidus Giovanni 'Butch' Gonzola	
Page Miss Glory	1935	Nick Papadopolis	
The Gay Deception	1935	Gettel	
I Live My Life	1935	Yaffitz, Bridge Player	
If You Could Only Cook	1935	Flash	
Soak the Rich	1936	Muglia (kidnapper)	
The Milky Way	1936	Spider Schultz	
The Music Goes 'Round	1936	O'Casey	
Mr. Deeds Goes to Town	1936	Cornelius Cobb	
Meet Nero Wolfe	1936	Archie Goodwin	
They Met in a Taxi	1936	Fingers Garrison	
More Than a Secretary	1936	Ernest	
I Loved a Soldier	1936		Unfinished
A Star Is Born	1937	Matt Libby	
The League of Frightened Men	1937	Archie Goodwin	
The Last Gangster	1937	'Curly'	
No Time to Marry	1938	Al Vogel	
Professor Beware	1938	Jerry	
The Crowd Roars	1938	'Happy' Lane	
The Ice Follies of 1939	1939	Mort Hodges	
What a Life	1939	Ferguson	
The Bride Wore Crutches	1940	'Flannel-Mouth' Moroni	
Hit Parade of 1941	1940		Uncredited
Hangmen Also Die!	1943	Banya	
Tahiti Honey	1943	Pinkie	
Guadalcanal Diary	1943	Sgt. Butch	
Fish Fry	1944	Cat (voice)	Short, uncredited
The Big Show-Off	1945	Joe Bagley	
The Kid from Brooklyn	1946	Spider Schultz	
In Old Sacramento	1946	Eddie Dodge	
A Boy, a Girl and a Dog	1946	Jim	
Specter of the Rose	1946	Lionel Gans	
Gentleman Joe Palooka	1946	Harry Mitchell	
The Sin of Harold Diddlebock	1947	Max	
Call Northside 777	1948	Corrigan - Wiecek's Cellmate	Uncredited
Texas, Brooklyn & Heaven	1948	Bellhop	
Wet Blanket Policy	1948	Buzz Buzzard (voice)	Short, uncredited
Unfaithfully Yours	1948	Hugo Standoff	
Trouble Makers	1948	'Hatchet' Moran	
Wild and Woody!	1948	Buzz Buzzard (voice)	Short, uncredited
Drooler's Delight	1949	Buzz Buzzard (voice)	Short, uncredited
Two Gals and a Guy	1951	Mr. Seymour	
St. Benny the Dip	1951	Monk Williams	
Blast of Silence	1961	Narrator (voice)	Uncredited
The Moving Finger	1963	Anatole	
The Loved One	1965	The Guru Brahmin	
Promise Her Anything	1966	Sam	
Cul-de-sac	1966	Richard	
Seven Times Seven	1968	Sam	
A Dandy in Aspic	1968	Sobakevich	
Beyond the Law (Al di là della legge)	1968	Preacher	
Gates to Paradise	1968	The Monk	
Once Upon a Time in the West	1968	Barman	
H2S	1969	Luigi Pavese	
Giacomo Casanova: Childhood and Adolescence	1969	Don Tosello	
Zenabel	1969	Pancrazio	
Boot Hill	1969	Mamy	
The Naughty Cheerleader	1970	The Admiral	
Crepa padrone, crepa tranquillo	1970		
Between Miracles	1971	Oreste Micheli	
The Gang That Couldn't Shoot Straight	1971	Baccala	
We Are All in Temporary Liberty	1971	Lawyer Bartoli	
Stanza 17-17 palazzo delle tasse, ufficio imposte	1971	Katanga	
Caliber 9	1972	Americano/Mikado	
The Eroticist	1972	Cardinal Maravidi	
Pulp	1972	Ben Dinuccio	
Where the Bullets Fly	1972	Lucky Capone	
Don Camillo e i giovani d'oggi	1972	Peppone	
Treasure Island	1972	Billy Bones	
Sting of the West	1972	Stinky Manure	
The Adventures of Pinocchio	1972	Mangiafuoco	
Halleluja to Vera Cruz	1973	Sam 'Tonaca' Thompson	
Pete, Pearl & the Pole	1973	Sparks	
Dirty Weekend	1973	General	
The Black Hand (The Birth of the Mafia)	1973	Lieutenant Giuseppe Petrosino	
My Pleasure Is Your Pleasure	1973	Il marchese Cavalcanti / Il cardinale di Ragusa	
Crescete e moltiplicatevi	1973		
Viaggia, ragazza, viaggia, hai la musica nelle vene	1973		
The Sensual Man	1973	Baron Castorini	
Innocence and Desire	1974	Salvatore Niscemi	
Di mamma non ce n'è una sola	1974	Elia	
La via dei babbuini	1974		
Cormack of the Mounties	1975	Doctor Higgins	
Mark of Zorro	1975	Padre Donato	
La novizia	1975	Don Nini	
The Black Bird	1975	Gordon Immerman	
San Pasquale Baylonne protettore delle donne	1976	Don Gervasio	
The Cassandra Crossing	1976	Max, the Train Conductor	
New York, New York	1977	Tony Harwell	
Matilda	1978	Pinky Schwab	
Cyclone	1978	Taylor	
The Rip-Off	1978	Sam	
1941	1979	Angelo Scioli	
The Transformers: The Movie	1986	Kup (voice)	
Bellifreschi	1987	Frank Santamaria	
Wicked Stepmother	1989	Sam	
Cookie	1989	Enzo Della Testa	
Joey Takes a Cab	1991	Joey	
The Last Good Time	1994	Howard Singer	

== Radio appearances ==
Year	Program	Episode/source
1937	Lux Radio Theatre	Mr. Deeds Goes to Town
