= List of French films of 1952 =

A list of films produced in France in 1952. An increasing number of films were made as co-productions with Italy and other nations.

== A–L ==
Title	Director	Cast	Genre	Notes
A Day with You	Jean-René Legrand	André Claveau, Véra Norman, Arlette Merry, Jean Tissier	Comedy musical	
Adorable Creatures	Christian-Jaque	Daniel Gélin, Antonella Lualdi, Danielle Darrieux	Romantic Comedy	Co-production with Italy
The Adventures of Mandrin	Mario Soldati	Raf Vallone, Silvana Pampanini, Jacques Castelot	Adventure	Co-production with Italy
The Agony of the Eagles	Jean Alden-Delos	Roger Pigaut, Charles Moulin, Noël Roquevert	Historical	
Algiers - Cape Town	Serge de Poligny		Documentary	
Alone in the World	René Chanas	Madeleine Robinson, René Lefèvre, Louis Seigner	Comedy drama	
An Artist with Ladies	Jean Boyer	Fernandel, Renée Devillers, Arlette Poirier	Comedy	
Article 519, Penal Code	Leonardo Cortese	Henri Vidal, Cosetta Greco, Paolo Stoppa	Drama	Co-production with Italy
Beauties of the Night	René Clair	Gérard Philipe, Martine Carol, Gina Lollobrigida	Romantic fantasy comedy	Co-production with Italy. Nominated for Golden Lion
The Case Against X	Richard Pottier	Yves Deniaud, Elina Labourdette, Yves Vincent	Crime	
Casque d'or	Jacques Becker	Simone Signoret, Serge Reggiani, Claude Dauphin	Crime drama	Nominated for Best Film, +2 wins
Crazy for Love	Jean Boyer	Bourvil, Jane Marken, Brigitte Bardot	Comedy	
The Crime of Bouif	André Cerf	Pierre Jourdan, Fernand Fabre, Jean Gaven	Comedy	
Crimson Curtain	André Barsacq	Michel Simon, Pierre Brasseur, Jean Brochard	Crime drama	
The Curious Adventures of Mr. Wonderbird	Paul Grimault		Animation comedy	
The Damned Lovers	Willy Rozier	Robert Berri, Jacques Dynam, Ginette Baudin	Crime	
Dans la vie tout s'arrange	Marcel Cravenne	Merle Oberon, Paul Henreid, Jim Gérald	Comedy	Co-production with UK; An English-language version The Lady from Boston was also made
Desperate Decision	Yves Allégret	Danièle Delorme, Henri Vidal, Jean Debucourt	Drama	
Domenica	Maurice Cloche	Odile Versois, Jean-Pierre Kérien, Albert Dinan	Drama	
Feather in the Wind	Louis Cuny, Ramón Torrado	Georges Guétary, Carmen Sevilla, Jacqueline Pierreux	Musical	Co-production with Spain
Fanfan la Tulipe	Christian-Jaque	Gina Lollobrigida, Gérard Philipe, Marcel Herrand	Comedy adventure	Co-production with Italy. Silver Bear at the Berlin International Film Festival
Farewell Paris	Claude Heymann	Françoise Arnoul, Henri Vilbert, Marcelle Arnold	Musical	
Forbidden Games	René Clément	Georges Poujouly, Brigitte Fossey, Laurence Badie	War drama	Won Golden Lion, +6 wins, +1 nomination
The Forest of Farewell	Ralph Habib	Françoise Arnoul, Jean-Claude Pascal	Drama	
Full House	Henri Verneuil	Michel Simon, Raymond Rouleau, John van Dreelen	Mystery crime	
The Girl and the Ghost	Marc Allégret	Robert Dhéry, Annik Morice, Félix Oudart	Comedy drama	
A Girl on the Road	Jean Stelli	Georges Guétary, Lenore Aubert, Liliane Bert	Comedy	
The Girl with the Whip	Jean Dréville	Michel Simon, Gaby Morlay, Colette Darfeuil	Drama	Co-production with Switzerland
The Golden Coach	Jean Renoir	Anna Magnani, Odoardo Spadaro, Duncan Lamont	Historical comedy	Co-production with Italy
Grand Gala	François Campaux	Ludmilla Tchérina, Odile Versois, Yves Vincent	Drama	
The Green Glove	Rudolph Maté	Glenn Ford, Geraldine Brooks, Cedric Hardwicke	Crime	Co-production with US
The Happiest of Men	Yves Ciampi	Fernand Gravey, Maria Mauban, Jean Parédès	Comedy	
Heart of the Casbah	Pierre Cardinal	Viviane Romance, Claude Laydu, Peter van Eyck	Drama	
Her Last Christmas	Jacques Daniel-Norman	Tino Rossi, Claude May, Louis Seigner	Musical	
Holiday for Henrietta	Julien Duvivier	Dany Robin, Michel Auclair, Hildegard Knef	Comedy	
The House on the Dune	Georges Lampin	Ginette Leclerc, Jean Chevrier, Roger Pigaut	Drama	
Imperial Violets	Richard Pottier	Luis Mariano, Carmen Sevilla, Simone Valère	Musical	Co-production with Spain
In the Land of the Sun	Maurice de Canonge	Tino Rossi, Véra Norman, Antonin Berval	Musical comedy	
It Happened in Paris	Henri Lavorel, John Berry	Henri Vidal, Evelyn Keyes, Jean Wall	Comedy	
It Is Midnight, Doctor Schweitzer	André Haguet	Pierre Fresnay, Raymond Rouleau, Jeanne Moreau	Drama	
Jocelyn	Jacques de Casembroot	Jean Desailly, Simone Valère, Jean Vilar	Historical	
Judgement of God	Raymond Bernard	Andrée Debar, Jean-Claude Pascal, Pierre Renoir, Gabrielle Dorziat	Drama historical	
The Last Stand	Max Joly	Édouard Delmont, Claire Oliver, Marcel Delaître, Michel Ardan	Crime	
Le Plaisir	Max Ophüls	Claude Dauphin, Madeleine Renaud, Danielle Darrieux	Comedy Drama	
Leathernose	Yves Allégret	Jean Marais, Françoise Christophe, Mariella Lotti	Historical	Co-production with Italy
Love in the Vineyard	Robert Vernay	Line Renaud, Lucien Baroux, Suzanne Dehelly	Comedy	
Love Is Not a Sin	Claude Cariven	Robert Dhéry, Colette Brosset, Maryse Martin	Comedy	
Love, Madame	Gilles Grangier	Arletty, François Périer, Marie Daëms	Comedy	

== M–Z ==
Title	Director	Cast	Genre	Notes
The Man in My Life	Guy Lefranc	Madeleine Robinson, Jeanne Moreau, Walter Santesso	Drama	Co-Production with Italy
Manon of the Spring	Marcel Pagnol	Jacqueline Pagnol, Raymond Pellegrin, Henri Vilbert	Drama	
Massacre in Lace	André Hunebelle	Raymond Rouleau, Anne Vernon, Tilda Thamar	Comedy crime	
Matrimonial Agency	Jean-Paul Le Chanois	Bernard Blier, Michèle Alfa, Julien Carette	Comedy drama	
Milady and the Musketeers	Vittorio Cottafavi	Rossano Brazzi, Yvette Lebon, Massimo Serato	Adventure	Co-production with Italy
The Mistress of Treves	Arthur Maria Rabenalt	Rossano Brazzi, Anne Vernon, Enzo Fiermonte	Historical	Co-production with Italy
The Moment of Truth	Jean Delannoy	Michèle Morgan, Jean Gabin, Walter Chiari	Drama	Co-production with Italy
Monsieur Leguignon, Signalman	Maurice Labro	Yves Deniaud, Jane Marken, Bernard Lajarrige	Comedy	
Monsieur Taxi	André Hunebelle	Michel Simon, Jane Marken, Jean Brochard	Comedy	
A Mother's Secret	Jean Gourguet	André Le Gall, Blanchette Brunoy, Grégoire Aslan	Drama	
My Priest Among the Rich	Henri Diamant-Berger	Yves Deniaud, Robert Arnoux, Raymond Bussières	Comedy	
My Wife, My Cow and Me	Jean Devaivre	Erminio Macario, Irène Corday, Annette Poivre	Comedy	
The Nude Dancer	Pierre-Louis	Catherine Erard, Pierre Larquey, Jean Debucourt	Comedy	
Piédalu Works Miracles	Jean Loubignac	Ded Rysel, Félix Oudart, Mary Marquet	Comedy	
Pleasures of Paris	Ralph Baum	Lucien Baroux, Jean Parédès, Geneviève Page	Comedy	
The Priest of Saint-Amour	Émile Couzinet	Frédéric Duvallès, Pierre Larquey, Jeanne Fusier-Gir	Comedy	
The Red Head	Paul Mesnier	Raymond Souplex, Germaine Dermoz, Pierre Larquey	Drama	
Red Shirts	Goffredo Alessandrini; Francesco Rosi	Anna Magnani, Raf Vallone, Jacques Sernas	Historical	Co-production with Italy
The Respectful Prostitute	Marcello Pagliero	Barbara Laage, Ivan Desny, Marcel Herrand	Crime drama	
The Road to Damascus	Max Glass	Michel Simon, Antoine Balpêtré, Jean-Marc Tennberg	Drama	
Sergil Amongst the Girls	Jacques Daroy	Paul Meurisse, Claudine Dupuis, Albert Dinan	Crime	
She and Me	Guy Lefranc	François Périer, Dany Robin, Jacqueline Gauthier	Comedy	
The Smugglers' Banquet	Henri Storck	Françoise Rosay, Jean-Pierre Kérien, Christiane Lénier	Comedy	Co-production with Belgium
Son of the Hunchback	Fernando Cerchio	Rossano Brazzi, Milly Vitale, Gabrielle Dorziat	Adventure	Co-production with Italy
They Were Five	Jack Pinoteau	Marcel André, Jean Carmet, Jean Gaven	Drama	
This Age Without Pity	Marcel Blistène	Jean Tissier, Colette Darfeuil, André Alerme	Comedy	
Three Women	André Michel	Maryse Martin, Marcelle Arnold, Agnès Delahaie	Comedy drama	Entered into the 1952 Cannes Film Festival
Trial at the Vatican	André Haguet	Jean Debucourt, Suzanne Flon, Catherine Fonteney	Drama	
La Vérité sur Bébé Donge	Henri Decoin	Danielle Darrieux, Jean Gabin, Jacques Castelot	Drama thriller	
Twelve Hours of Happiness	Gilles Grangier	Dany Robin, Georges Marchal, Jean Tissier	Comedy drama	
Wanda the Sinner	Duilio Coletti	Yvonne Sanson, Frank Villard, Françoise Rosay	Drama	Co-production with Italy
We Are All Murderers	André Cayatte	Marcel Mouloudji, Raymond Pellegrin, Claude Laydu	Crime	Co-production with Italy
Wolves Hunt at Night	Bernard Borderie	Jean-Pierre Aumont, Carla Del Poggio, Fernand Ledoux	Spy	Co-production with Italy
The Woman with the Orchid	Raymond Leboursier	Tilda Thamar, Georges Rollin, Lucien Gallas	Crime	
Women Are Angels	Marcel Aboulker	Viviane Romance, Jeanne Fusier-Gir, André Gabriello	Comedy	

== Documentaries and shorts ==
Title	Director	Cast	Genre	Notes
The King and the Mockingbird	Paul Grimault	Jean Martin, Pascal Mazzotti	Animation comedy	Nominated for BAFTA Award
La Villa Santo-Sospir	Jean Cocteau		Documentary	

== See also ==
- 1952 in France
