= Nu =

Nu or NU may refer to:

== Arts and entertainment ==
=== Music ===
- Nu metal, a heavy metal fusion genre
- Nu jazz, a jazz fusion genre
- Nu-disco, a genre of dance music
- Nu gaze, a derivative form of shoegaze and alt-rock genre
- Nu prog, a subgenre of progressive rock
- Nu-funk, a genre of dance music

=== Other media ===
- Nu-13, a fictional character from the BlazBlue video game series
- Nu (Chrono Trigger), a fictional species from the video game Chrono Trigger
- N.U. (film), 1948 documentary film directed by Michelangelo Antonioni
- Mr. Nu, a fictional character from the novel Hitman: Enemy Within
- Nu Gundam from the anime Mobile Suit Gundam: Char's Counterattack
- Nickelodeon Universe, an indoor theme park at Mall of America
- Nu, a 1934 collection of essays written in Romanian by Eugène Ionesco

== Businesses and organizations ==
=== Universities ===
==== United States ====
- National University (California), a private nonprofit university in La Jolla, California, US
- Niagara University, a Roman Catholic university in Niagara County, New York, US
- Northeastern University, a research university in Boston, Massachusetts, US
- Northwest University (Washington), a private university in Kirkland, Washington, US
- Northwestern University, a research institution in Evanston, Illinois, US
- Norwich University, a private military and traditional university in Northfield, Vermont, US
- University of Nebraska–Lincoln, a public land-grant research university in Lincoln, Nebraska, US

==== Japan ====
- Nagoya University, a national research university
- Niigata University, a national university
- Nihon University, a private university in Tokyo

==== Other countries ====
- National University, Bangladesh, a public collegiate university of Bangladesh
- Nazarbayev University, an international research university based in Astana, Kazakhstan
- Nanjing University, a national university in China
- Naresuan University, a public university in Phitsanulok, Thailand
- Nile University, a private research university in Egypt
- National University (Philippines), a private, non-sectarian university in Manila, Philippines
  - NU Bulldogs, the intercollegiate athletic program of the above school
- Nkumba University, a private university near Entebbe, Uganda
- Nirma University, a private university in Ahmedabad, India
- Northern University, Nowshera, a private university in Nowshera, Pakistan

=== Other businesses and organizations ===
- Nahdatul Ulama, an Islamic group in Indonesia
- Northeast Utilities, a gas and electric company in the northeastern US
- Northern Union, an early name of the Rugby Football League
- NU.nl, a Dutch online newspaper
- Nubank (NYSE: NU), a Brazilian bank
- Japan Transocean Air (IATA airline designator NU)

== Language and scripts ==
- Nu (cuneiform), a cuneiform sign
- Nu (Greek) (Ν or ν), the 13th letter of the Greek alphabet
- Nu (Armenian) (Ն or ն), the 22nd letter of the Armenian alphabet
- Nu (kana), the Japanese characters ぬ and ヌ
- Nu (Yiddish), an interjection meaning "so what" or "hurry up"
- Nǀu language, a moribund Tuu (Khoisan) language spoken by the Nǁnǂe people in South Africa

== People ==
=== Burmese people ===
- Nga Nu, a pretender to the Ava throne (1367)
- Saya Gyi U Nu, a writer famous during King Bodawpaya's reign (r. 1782–1819)
- Me Nu, chief queen of King Bagyidaw (r. 1819–1837)
- U Nu, prime minister of the Union of Burma (1948–1958; 1960–1962)

=== Other peoples ===
- Nu people, a Chinese ethnic group

== Places ==
- Nu river or Salween River, in China, Burma, and Thailand
- Nicaragua (NATO country code NU)
- Niue, (ISO 3166 country code NU)
  - .nu, the Internet top-level domain for Niue
- Nunavut, the largest and newest of the territories of Canada
- North Uist, an island in the Scottish Hebrides

== Science and technology ==
- Norton Utilities, system diagnostic software
- .nu, the Internet top-level domain for Niue
- Nu (programming language), an interpreted object-oriented programming language
- NuMachine, a computer architecture developed at MIT
- Nucellar embryony (Nu+), a form of seed reproduction that occurs in certain plant species
- Nusselt number (Nu), a dimensionless heat transfer ratio
- Nanodalton, a unit of mass; see dalton (unit)
- Natural uranium, referring to uranium with the same isotopic ratio as found in nature, abbreviated "NU"
- Sega Nu, arcade board architecture
- Not used (N.U.), indicating not populated parts in schematics and BOMs
- Poisson's ratio, a dimensionless ratio relating strain on element along one axis to the strain in an orthogonal axis, is symbolized by the Greek letter Nu, ν
- Nucleophile (Nu), a chemical species that forms bonds by donating an electron pair

== Other uses ==
- Negative utilitarianism, an ethical philosophy
- Nu (mythology), the male form of the Egyptian goddess Naunet
- The Chinese term for crossbow, as in the chu-ko-nu or repeating crossbow
- Bhutanese ngultrum (Nu.), the official currency of Bhutan
- Japan Transocean Air (IATA airline code NU)
- NU, designation used for the Nestle-Aland and United Bible Societies biblical texts in the New King James Version
- NU 107, defunct radio station in the Philippines
- Hyundai Nu engine, an engine produced by Hyundai Motor Company

== See also ==
- Nus (disambiguation)
- Gnu
- GNU
- New (disambiguation)
- Nü
