= Jean-Roger Caussimon =

French actor (1918–1985)

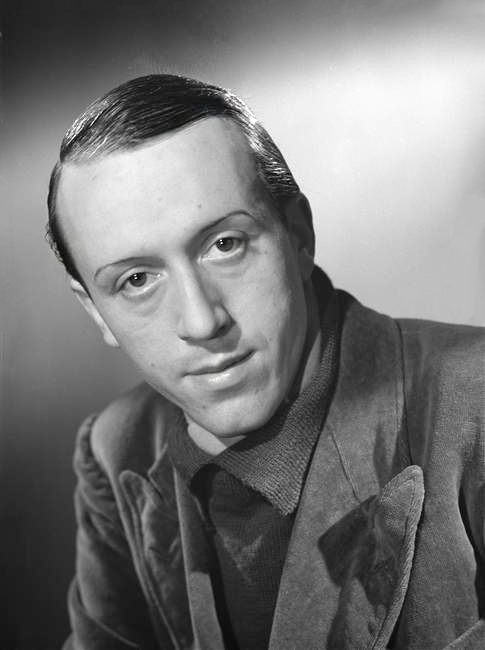
- Born: 24 July 1918; Paris, France
- Died: 19 October 1985 (aged 67); Paris, France
- Occupations: Actor, singer
- Years active: 1945–1985

Jean-Roger Caussimon (24 July 1918 – 19 October 1985) was a "provocative, anarchising" French singer-songwriter and film actor. He appeared in 90 films between 1945 and 1985 but is better known for having worked with poet-singer Léo Ferré.

== Discography ==
=== Studio albums ===
- Jean-Roger Caussimon chante Jean-Roger Caussimon (1970)
- À la Seine (1972)
- Musique légère (1974)
- Il fait soleil (1975)
- Chanson de l'homme heureux (1977)
- Papy rock (1979)

=== Live albums ===
- Au théâtre de la Ville (1978)

==== Posthumous releases ====
- En public à l'Olympia 74 (1992)
- Jean-Roger Caussimon au cabaret du Lapin Agile (2003)

== Selected filmography ==
- François Villon (1945) - Le grand écolier
- The Last Judgment (1945)
- Pétrus (1946) - Milou
- Destiny Has Fun (1946) - Marcel
- Captain Blomet (1947) - Clodomir
- La fleur de l'âge (1947)
- Le mannequin assassiné (1948) - Jérôme
- Clochemerle (1948) - Samotras
- The Murdered Model (1948) - L'inspecteur
- Bonheur en location (1949) - Julien
- The Man from Jamaica (1950) - Le docteur Van Boeken
- The Red Rose (1951) - L'homme du bar
- Juliette, or Key of Dreams (1951) - Le châtelain & Monsieur Bellanger
- The Red Inn (1951) - Darwin
- Milady and the Musketeers (1952) - Mastro Pietro / Boia di Lilla
- La Reine Margot (1954) - Le gouverneur de la prison / Prison Governor
- French Cancan (1955) - Baron Walter
- Bel Ami (1955) - Charles Forestier
- House on the Waterfront (1955) - Monsieur Black
- La villa Sans-Souci (1955) - Jarewski
- Fernand cow-boy (1956) - Castor Prudent
- Et par ici la sortie (1957) - Picatellos
- Three Sailors (1957) - Éric Bergen
- Ce joli monde (1957) - Joseph
- Un homme se penche sur son passé (1958) - Stopwell
- Quand sonnera midi (1958) - Don Gaspar
- The Mask of the Gorilla (1958) - Léon
- Le Sicilien (1958) - Beau Parleur
- Dangerous Games (1958) - Bourdieux
- Le petit prof (1959) - Le proviseur
- Le Saint mène la danse (1960) - Le maître d'hôtel
- The Return of Dr. Mabuse (1961) - Küster
- La Fayette (1962) - Maurepas
- À fleur de peau (1962) - M. Brémont
- Hardi Pardaillan! (1964) - Ruggieri
- Les baratineurs (1965) - L'héraldiste
- L'amour à la chaîne (1965) - Le curé
- The Treasure of the Aztecs (1965) - Marshal Bazaine
- The Pyramid of the Sun God (1965) - Marshall Bazaine (uncredited)
- Thomas the Impostor (1965) - L'évêque
- Pleins feux sur Stanislas (1965) - Le faux conservateur en chef
- Dis-moi qui tuer (1965) - Kopf
- Deux heures à tuer (1966) - Gabriel Damerville
- Triple Cross (1966) - Luftwaffe General
- Fantômas contre Scotland Yard (1967) - Lord Edward MacRashley / Fantômas
- Les Assassins de l'ordre (1971) - Le commissaire Lagache
- Tout le monde il est beau, tout le monde il est gentil (1972) - Le père Derugleux
- Five Leaf Clover (1972) - Vampirus
- Moi y'en a vouloir des sous (1973) - L'évêque
- Que la fête commence (1975) - Le cardinal
- The Judge and the Assassin (1976) - Street Singer
- Deux imbéciles heureux (1976) - Albert Breux
- The Gendarme and the Extra-Terrestrials (1979) - L'évêque
- Signé Furax (1981) - Le jardinier
- Les Misérables (1982) - Le Conventionnel
- La baraka (1982) - Le clochard
