= Giancarlo Bartolini Salimbeni =

Italian film art director and costume designer

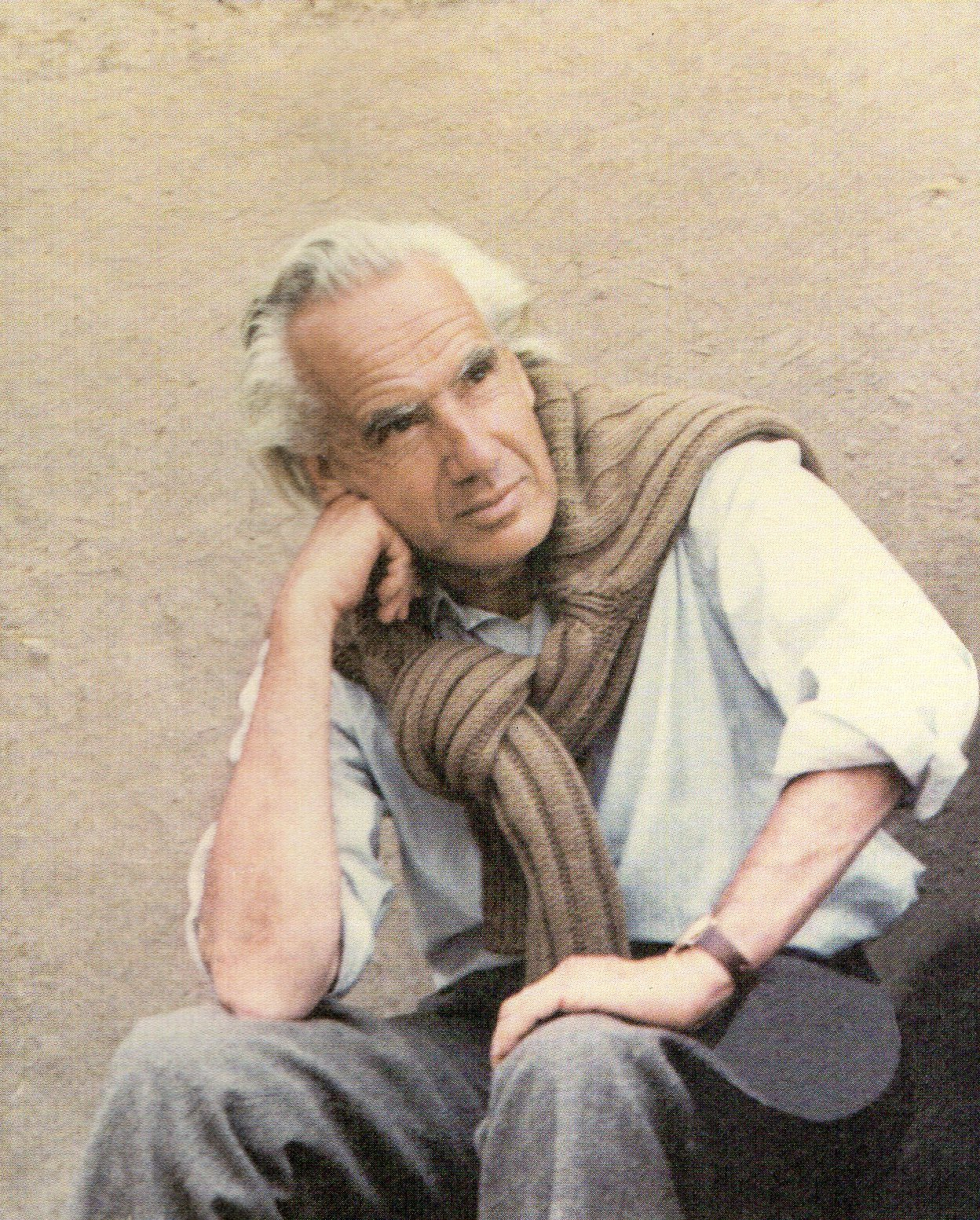
- Born: 4 November 1916; Florence, Tuscany, Italy
- Died: 17 January 2000 (aged 83); Rome, Lazio, Italy
- Occupations: Art Director, Costume Designer
- Years active: 1942–1983

Giancarlo Bartolini Salimbeni (1916–2000) was an Italian film art director and costume designer.

== Selected filmography ==
- The Mistress of Treves (1952)
- Milady and the Musketeers (1952)
- Son of the Hunchback (1952)
- The Merchant of Venice (1953)
- The Lovers of Manon Lescout (1954)
- The King's Prisoner (1954)
- The Angel of the Alps (1957)
- Pirates of the Coast (1960)
- Kerim, Son of the Sheik (1962)
- Sandokan Against the Leopard of Sarawak (1964)
- Mutiny at Fort Sharpe (1966)
- The Garden of the Finzi-Continis (1970)
- The Kiss (1974)

== Bibliography ==
- James McKay. The Films of Victor Mature. McFarland, 2012.
