= La Vérité sur Bébé Donge =

La vérité sur Bébé Donge
- Directed by: Henri Decoin (as Henry Decoin)
- Written by: Maurice Aubergé (adaptation); Maurice Aubergé (dialogue)
- Screenplay by: Maurice Aubergé
- Based on: Georges Simenon (novel)
- Starring: Danielle Darrieux; Jean Gabin
- Cinematography: Léonce-Henri Burel (as L.H. Burel)
- Edited by: Annick Millet (as A. Millet)
- Music by: Jean-Jacques Grünenwald (as J.J. Grunenwald)
- Color process: Black and white
- Production company: Union Générale Cinématographique
- Distributed by: L'Alliance Générale de Distribution Cinématographique
- Release date: 13 February 1952
- Running time: 115 minutes
- Country: France
- Language: French
- Box office: 1,249,698 admissions (France)

La Vérité sur Bébé Donge (aka The Truth About Bebe Donge or UK title: The Truth of Our Marriage) is a 1952 French drama thriller film directed by Henri Decoin and starring Danielle Darrieux and Jean Gabin. The plot is essentially the analysis of a couple's marriage that has broken down; the film is based on the novel by Georges Simenon.

== Plot ==
A wealthy industrialist François Donge is seriously ill in hospital, apparently suffering from food poisoning. He realises this his wife, Bébé, has poisoned him. Without recrimination, he looks back on their marriage and tries to understand why she should want to kill him...

== Cast ==
- Danielle Darrieux as Elisabeth 'Bébé' Donge
- Jean Gabin as François Donge
- Jacques Castelot as Docteur Jalabert
- Daniel Lecourtois as Georges Donge
- Madeleine Lambert as Madame d'Onneville
- Juliette Faber as L'infirmière
- Jacqueline Porel as Françoise
- Gaby Bruyère as La fille dans le taxi (as Gaby Bruyere)
- Meg Lemonnier as La secrétaire
- Alinda Kristensen as Madame Flament
- Yvonne Claudie as Une joueuse de bridge
- Jean-Marc Tennberg as Le liftier (as J.M. Tennberg)
- Marcel André as Le juge d'instruction
- Claude Génia as Jeanne Donge
- Gabrielle Dorziat as Madame D'Ortemont

== See also ==
- List of French films of 1952
