= The Merchant of Venice (1953 film) =

1953 French-Italian drama film

- Directed by: Pierre Billon
- Written by: Pierre Billon; Louis Ducreux; Cesare Lodovici; Giuseppe Mangione; Corrado Sofia; Federico Zardi
- Based on: The Merchant of Venice by William Shakespeare
- Produced by: Giorgio Venturini; Eugène Tucherer
- Starring: Michel Simon; Andrée Debar; Massimo Serato
- Cinematography: Arturo Gallea
- Edited by: Loris Bellero
- Music by: Giovanni Fusco
- Production companies: Élysée Films; Venturini Film
- Distributed by: DisCina; Venturini Film
- Release date: 1 February 1953
- Running time: 102 minutes
- Countries: France; Italy
- Language: French

The Merchant of Venice (French: Le Marchand de Venise, Italian: Il mercante di Venezia) is a 1953 French-Italian drama film directed by Pierre Billon and starring Michel Simon, Andrée Debar and Massimo Serato. It is loosely based on William Shakespeare's Elizabethan play of the same name.

The film's sets were designed by the art director Giancarlo Bartolini Salimbeni.

== Plot ==
In order to come to the aid of his friend Bassanio, the wealthy merchant Antonio, while awaiting the imminent arrival of his ships, is obliged to ask the usurer Shylock to advance him a sum of money. The latter accepts, on the condition that, if the loan is not returned on time, he will pay himself by taking a pound of flesh from his creditor.

== Cast ==
- Michel Simon as Shylock
- Andrée Debar as Portia
- Massimo Serato as Antonio
- Armando Francioli as Bassanio
- Giorgio Albertazzi as Lorenzo
- Liliana Tellini as Jessica
- Olga Solbelli as Bianca
- Clara Auteri as Nerissa
- Franco Balducci as Antonio's friend
- Nerio Bernardi as Doge
- Gualtiero Tumiati as Dr. Bellario

== Bibliography ==
- Burt, Richard. Shakespeares After Shakespeare: An Encyclopedia of the Bard in Mass Media and Popular Culture, Volume 1. Greenwood Press, 2007.
