= NUS =

NUS or Nus may refer to:

== Education ==
- National University of Singapore
- National University of Samoa

== Location ==
- Nus, Aosta Valley, Italy

== Organization ==
- National Union of Students (Australia)
- National Union of Students (Canada) (disbanded)
- National Union of Students (United Kingdom)
- National Union of Seamen
- Nu Skin Enterprises (ticker code)
- Norrland's University Hospital, Umeå, Sweden

== People ==
- Nus Ghani (born 1972), British politician
- Nus Braka, fictional character from Star Trek: Starfleet Academy

== Other ==
- Neglected and Underutilized Species, or Neglected and underutilized crops
- Norsup Airport (IATA airport code), on Malakula Island in Vanuatu
- NUS, the product code used by Nintendo for Nintendo 64 hardware and software, a reference to the platform's preliminary name of Nintendo Ultra 64

== See also ==
- Nu (disambiguation)
- Nuss (disambiguation)
