= Judgment of God =

Judgment of God may refer to:

- Judgement of God, the English language title for the 1952 French film Le Jugement de Dieu;
- Eschatology, the theological field dealing with the ultimate destiny of humans and the universe, including
  - The Last Judgment in Christian eschatology
  - Qiyamah in Islamic eschatology
  - Jewish eschatology
