= The King's Prisoner (1954 film) =

1954 film

- French poster
- Directed by: Giorgio Venturini
- Written by: Dominique Vincent; Jacques Viot
- Based on: The Man in the Iron Mask by Alexandre Dumas
- Produced by: Giorgio Venturini
- Starring: Pierre Cressoy; Andrée Debar; Armando Francioli
- Cinematography: Arturo Gallea
- Edited by: Loris Bellero
- Music by: Ezio Carabella
- Production company: Venturini Film
- Distributed by: Venturini Film
- Release date: 29 July 1954
- Running time: 88 minutes
- Country: Italy
- Language: Italian

The King's Prisoner (Italian: Il prigioniero del re) is a 1954 Italian historical adventure film directed by Giorgio Venturini and starring Pierre Cressoy, Andrée Debar and Armando Francioli. It is based on the novel The Man in the Iron Mask by Alexandre Dumas.

The film's sets and costumes were designed by the art director Giancarlo Bartolini Salimbeni. It was shot in Ferraniacolor and earned around 269 million lira at the box office.

== Cast ==
- Pierre Cressoy as Henri/Louis XIV
- Andrée Debar as Elisabeth de Moreuil
- Armando Francioli as Roland
- Xenia Valderi as Rosa
- Luigi Tosi as Carcan
- Marcello Giorda as La Rabaudière
- Nerio Bernardi as Saint-Maur
- Olga Solbelli as Regina Anna d'Austria (Anne of Austria)
- Adolfo Geri as La Tallier
- Sergio Bergonzelli
- Miranda Campa

== Bibliography ==
- Chiti, Roberto & Poppi, Roberto. Dizionario del cinema italiano: Dal 1945 al 1959. Gremese Editore, 1991.
- Goble, Alan. The Complete Index to Literary Sources in Film. Walter de Gruyter, 1999.
- Klossner, Michael. The Europe of 1500-1815 on Film and Television: A Worldwide Filmography of Over 2550 Works, 1895 Through 2000. McFarland & Company, 2002.
