= Maurice Aubergé =

French screenwriter (1910–1974)

- Born: 21 October 1910; Orléans, Loiret, France
- Died: 3 May 1974 (aged 63); Neuilly-sur-Seine, Hauts-de-Seine, France
- Occupation: Screenwriter
- Years active: 1942–1968 (film)

Maurice Aubergé (1910–1974) was a French screenwriter. Among the films he worked on was the 1952 film noir La Vérité sur Bébé Donge.

== Selected filmography ==
- The Trump Card (1942)
- Paris Frills (1945)
- Dawn Devils (1946)
- La Vérité sur Bébé Donge (1952)
- Men in White (1955)
- The Lebanese Mission (1956)
- Mimi Pinson (1958)
- The Daughter of Hamburg (1958)
- Tomorrow Is My Turn (1960)
- Anatomy of a Marriage: My Days with Françoise (1964)
- Anatomy of a Marriage: My Days with Jean-Marc (1964)

== Bibliography ==
- Assouline, Pierre. Simenon: A Biography. Knopf, 1997.
- Hayward, Susan. Simone Signoret: The Star as Cultural Sign. Continuum, 2004.
- Leahy, Sarah & Vanderschelden, Isabelle. Screenwriters in French cinema. Manchester University Press, 2021.
- Sieglohr, Ulrike (ed.) Heroines Without Heroes: Reconstructing Female and National Identities in European Cinema, 1945-51. Bloomsbury Publishing, 2016.
