= The Pharaohs' Woman =

1960 film by Victor Tourjansky

- Directed by: Victor Tourjansky
- Written by: Remigio Del Grosso; Ugo Liberatore
- Story by: Virgilio Tosi; Massimo Vitalo
- Produced by: Giorgio Venturini
- Cinematography: Pier Ludovico Pavoni
- Edited by: Antonietta Zita
- Music by: Giovanni Fusco
- Distributed by: Universal Pictures
- Release date: 1960
- Running time: 87 min.
- Country: Italy
- Language: Italian

The Pharaohs' Woman (Italian: La donna dei faraoni) is a 1960 Italian historical drama film directed by Victor Tourjansky and starring John Drew Barrymore. The film is set in Ancient Egypt during the 31st century BCE (shortly after the unification of Upper and Lower Egypt) and pertains to a love story set against the backdrop of a power struggle between a prince of the former ruling dynasty of Lower Egypt and the new overlords from Upper Egypt. It was the first feature film shot in Techniscope.

== Plot ==
Ramses, prince of Thebes and Pharaoh of Upper Egypt, is in dispute with his cousin Sabaku, prince of Bubasti and Pharaoh of Lower Egypt. The noble Amosis, in an attempt to reconcile them, takes them on a cruise on the Nile, but the three, during a game of dice, meet Akis, whom they are fascinated by. The game of dice therefore has the girl as its stake, and is won by Ramses, but bad luck wants Akis to be guarded by Farka, Ramses' servant and friend of Amosis, who then entrusts the young woman to the priestess of the temple of Bubastis. However, she is discovered and denounced by Mareth, a jealous lady from Sabaku. A series of events will force the young Akis to plan her revenge, and the destruction of the couple ...

== Cast ==
- Linda Cristal as Akis
- Pierre Brice as Amosis the Physician
- John Drew Barrymore as Sabaku, Prince of Bubastis
- Armando Francioli as Ramses, Prince of Thebes
- Lilli Lembo as Mareth
- Nerio Bernardi
- Guido Celano
- Enzo Fiermonte

== See also ==
- List of historical drama films
