= Marie Sabouret =

French actress

- Born: 31 January 1924; La Rochelle, Charente-Maritime, France
- Died: 23 July 1960 (aged 36); Saint-Jean-de-Luz, Pyrénées-Atlantiques, France
- Occupation: Actress
- Years active: 1952-1958 (film)

Marie Sabouret (31 January 1924 – 23 July 1960) was a French stage and film actress.

== Filmography ==
Year	Title	Role	Notes
1952	Imperial Violets	Mme. de Pierrefeu	
1953	Mina de Vanghel	Mme de Larçay	
1953	The Three Musketeers	La Reine Anne d'Autriche	
1954	Royal Affairs in Versailles	La princesse de Lamballe	Uncredited
1954	The Beautiful Otero	Diane de Nemours	
1955	Rififi	Mado les Grands Bras	
1955	Frou-Frou	La grande duchesse Anna Ivanovna, patronne du restaurant russe	
1957	Trois jours à vivre	Patronnesse du café	Uncredited
1958	The Mask of the Gorilla	Chaboute	
1958	Le bourgeois gentilhomme	Dorimène, marquise	(final film role)

== Bibliography ==
- Alastair Phillips. Rififi: French Film Guide. I.B.Tauris, 2009.
