= Marcello Giorda =

Italian actor (1890–1960)

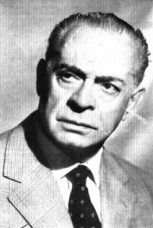
- Giorda in 1958.
- Born: 16 January 1890; Rome, Lazio, Italy
- Died: 21 April 1960 (aged 70); Rome, Lazio Italy
- Occupation: Actor
- Years active: 1916–1960 (film)

Marcello Giorda (1890–1960) was an Italian film actor.

== Selected filmography ==
- Adam's Tree (1936)
- The Last Days of Pompeo (1937)
- The Two Misanthropists (1937)
- Scipio Africanus: The Defeat of Hannibal (1937)
- Don Pasquale (1940)
- Beatrice Cenci (1941)
- The Adventures of Fra Diavolo (1942)
- Rita of Cascia (1943)
- The White Angel (1943)
- Hotel Luna, Room 34 (1946)
- Crossroads of Passion (1948)
- Hand of Death (1949)
- Lorenzaccio (1951)
- Ha da venì... don Calogero! (1952)
- Genoese Dragnet (1952)
- A Parisian in Rome (1954)
- The King's Prisoner (1954)
- Escape to the Dolomites (1955)
- The Doll That Took the Town (1956)
- Il marito (1957)
- The Great War (1959)

== Bibliography ==
- Goble, Alan. The Complete Index to Literary Sources in Film. Walter de Gruyter, 1999.
