= Tomorrow Is My Turn (film) =

Le Passage du Rhin
- Poster
- Directed by: André Cayatte
- Written by: Maurice Aubergé; André Cayatte
- Starring: Charles Aznavour
- Music by: Louiguy
- Production company: UFA
- Release dates: September 1960 (VFF); 1 February 1962 (New York City)
- Countries: France; West Germany; Italy
- Languages: French; German

Le Passage du Rhin is a 1960 French film directed by André Cayatte. It was released in the US as Tomorrow is My Turn.

== Plot ==
The film tells the story of two French soldiers in the aftermath of the German invasion of France who become forced labourers on a German farm under the Service du travail obligatoire programme (STO), but become involved in the lives of their captors.

== Cast ==
- Charles Aznavour as Roger Perrin
- Nicole Courcel as Florence
- Georges Rivière as Jean Durrieu
- Cordula Trantow as Helga
- Georges Chamarat as le boulanger / Baker
- Jean Marchat as Michel Delmas
- Albert Dinan as le milicien Cadix
- Michel Etcheverry as Ludovic
- Ruth Hausmeister as Frau Keßler
- Benno Hoffmann as Otto
- Henri Lambert as Louis
- Lotte Ledl as Lotte
- Bernard Musson as le prisonnier libéré
- Alfred Schieske as Fritz Keßler
- Betty Schneider as Alice
- Nerio Bernardi as Rodier
- Serge Frédéric
- Albert Rémy
- Colette Régis
- Jean Verner

== Awards ==
The film won the Golden Lion at the Venice Film Festival.
