= Renzo Lucidi =

Italian film editor

- Occupation: Editor
- Years active: 1940–1979

Renzo Lucidi was an Italian film editor who worked on more than sixty films between 1940 and 1979. He worked with Orson Welles several times, including editing Othello (1951) and Mr. Arkadin (1955).

== Selected filmography ==
- Marco Visconti (1941)
- Honeymoon (1941)
- Thrill (1941)
- Alone at Last (1942)
- Short Circuit (1943)
- Harlem (1943)
- The Barber of Seville (1947)
- The Brothers Karamazov (1947)
- A Night of Fame (1949)
- The Flame That Will Not Die (1949)
- The Pirates of Capri (1949)
- The Thief of Venice (1950)
- L' Amore di Norma (1950)
- Othello (1951)
- A Woman Has Killed (1952)
- Son of the Hunchback (1952)
- Milady and the Musketeers (1952)
- Melody of Love (1952)
- Storm (1954)
- Mr. Arkadin (1955)
- The Red Cloak (1955)
- Romanoff and Juliet (1961)
- My Son, the Hero (1962)
- Taras Bulba, the Cossack (1962)
- The Empty Canvas (1963)
- A Man Called Sledge (1970)
- It Can Be Done Amigo (1972)
- Due cuori, una cappella (1975)

== Bibliography ==
- Rosenbaum, Jonathan. Discovering Orson Welles. University of California Press, 2007.
