= Prisoner in the Tower of Fire =

1953 film

- Directed by: Giorgio W. Chili
- Written by: Alfred Niblo; Giorgio W. Chili
- Starring: Elisa Cegani; Milly Vitale
- Cinematography: Oberdan Trojani
- Edited by: Nino Baragli
- Music by: Carlo Rustichelli
- Distributed by: C.I.D.
- Release date: 28 May 1953
- Country: Italy
- Language: Italian

Prisoner in the Tower of Fire (Italian: Prigioniera della torre di fuoco, also known as The Prisoner in the Fuoco Tower) is a 1953 Italian historical melodrama film written and directed by Giorgio W. Chili.

== Plot ==
The film is set in the 15th century. Two young people belonging to families in conflict with each other form a strong friendship: their loyalty is severely tested when they fall in love with the same woman.

== Cast ==
- Elisa Cegani as Bianca Maltivoglio
- Milly Vitale as Germana Della Valle
- Ugo Sasso as Cesco Di Maltivoglio
- Carlo Giustini as Marco Pepli
- Attilio Dottesio as Carlo Pepli
- Nino Manfredi as Stornello
- Oscar Andriani as Friar Anselmo
- Cesare Fantoni as Lorenzo Pepli
- Carlo Ninchi as Giovanni Sforza
- Rossano Brazzi as Cesare Borgia
- Franco Pesce as Pietro
- Memmo Carotenuto as Raimondo
- Giulio Calì as Giulio
- Ada Colangeli as Ancella
