= The Reluctant Spy =

- Directed by: Jean-Charles Dudrumet
- Written by: Michel Cousin; Jean-Charles Dudrumet
- Produced by: Films de la Licorne, Italgamma
- Starring: Jean Marais; Geneviève Page
- Music by: Georges Delerue
- Release date: 4 September 1963 (France)
- Running time: 91 minutes
- Countries: France, Italy
- Language: French
- Box office: 1,803,068 admissions (France)

The Reluctant Spy (French: L'honorable Stanislas, agent secret, Italian: Spionaggio senza frontiere, also known as How to Be a Spy Without Even Trying) is a French-Italian spy-comedy film from 1963, directed by Jean-Charles Dudrumet, written by Michel Cousin, starring Jean Marais and Geneviève Page.

It is a parody of espionage films. It was followed by sequel Pleins feux sur Stanislas.

== Plot ==
Stanislas Dubois is an ordinary businessman. When he meets a woman on a date in a restaurant, he takes off his coat. Upon leaving he confuses a similar coat with his own. Following this mix-up he becomes increasingly aware that something about him is attracting peculiar people. Hidden in his new coat is a microfilm which interests more than one secret service. After being drawn into the world of international espionage, a secret service of his own country hires him to lure enemy spies into a trap.

== Cast ==
- Jean Marais (Stanislas Evariste Dubois, director of an advertising agency)
- Geneviève Page (Ursula Keller, museum guide)
- Noël Roquevert (Inspector Mouton)
- Gaia Germani (Andrea, the female spokesman)
- Maurice Teynac (Alfred Thirios, the trafficker)
- Jean Galland (Colonel Derblay, press relations officer)
- Christian Marin (Lecanut, the secretary of Inspector Mouton)
- Mathilde Casadessus (Maria Linas, the diva)
- Marcelle Arnold (Miss Morin, the secretary of Stanislas)
- Hélène Dieudonné (grandmother of Stanislas)
- Germaine Dermoz (mother of Stanislas)
- Yvonne Clech (the lady on the train)
- Louis Arbessier (the museum director)
- Robert Rollis (mailman)
- Pierre Tornade (inspector)
