= The Three Musketeers (1953 film) =

1953 film

- Directed by: André Hunebelle
- Written by: Michel Audiard
- Based on: The Three Musketeers; 1844 novel by Alexandre Dumas
- Produced by: Paul Cadéac
- Starring: Georges Marchal; Bourvil; Jean Martinelli; Danielle Godet
- Cinematography: Marcel Grignon; Henri Thibault
- Edited by: Jean Feyte
- Music by: Jean Marion; Costantino Ferri
- Distributed by: Pathé; Titanus
- Release dates: 7 October 1953 (France); 8 December 1953 ((Italy))
- Running time: 120 minutes
- Countries: France; Italy
- Language: French
- Box office: 5,354,739 admissions

The Three Musketeers (French: Les Trois Mousquetaires) is a 1953 French-Italian historical adventure film based on the 1844 French The Three Musketeers. This adaptation is one of five films director André Hunebelle and screen writer Michel Audiard achieved together. Georges Marchal portrayed d'Artagnan.

== Plot ==
Young d'Artagnan leaves his parents and travels from his native Gascony to the capital of France because he wants to prove himself an excellent fencer and to become a musketeer. He is told by his father he must not avoid any duel.

On his way to Paris, d'Artagnan feels that his honour is besmirched because he overhears how his horse is derided by a sinister nobleman. He can not help but demand immediate satisfaction. Unfortunately, of all men he finds he has challenged the Count de Rochefort, a shifty character to whom Cardinal Richelieu frequently entrusts covert operations. Rochefort's henchmen take care of d'Artagnan and steal from him.

The enraged d'Artagnan is determined to take revenge and will eventually have the chance to do so, for Anne of Austria has given a present to her secret admirer the Duke of Buckingham, and d'Artagnan must retrieve it from him, although he is now already back in England. If he fails her, Cardinal Richelieu is going to disclose Queen Anne's infidelity to King Louis XIII, in order to force a war against England upon him. The Cardinal and Count de Rochefort will do everything in their power if only they can put paid to d'Artagnan's mission. But with help from his three new friends d'Artagnan prevails.

== Cast ==
| Actor | Character |
|---|---|
| Georges Marchal | d'Artagnan |
| Bourvil | Planchet |
| Jean Martinelli | Athos |
| Gino Cervi | Porthos |
| Jacques François | Aramis |
| Danielle Godet | Constance Bonacieux |
| Marie Sabouret | Queen Anne |
| Louis Arbessier | King Louis XIII |
| Renaud Mary | Cardinal Richelieu |
| Yvonne Sanson | Milady de Winter |
| Jean-Marc Tennberg | Count De Rochefort |
| Steve Barclay | Duke of Buckingham |
| Françoise Prévost | Ketty |
| Félix Oudart | M. de Tréville |
| Claude Dauphin | the narrator |

== Production ==
The film was shot in the Saint-Maurice Studios in Paris, on the premises of castle Fontainebleau and in the Forest of Fontainebleau. In 1966 André Hunebelle returned to Fontainebleau for his film Fantômas contre Scotland Yard.

== Reception ==
It was the sixth most successful film at the French box office in 1953, after The Greatest Show on Earth, The Return of Don Camillo, Peter Pan, The Wages of Fear and Quo Vadis.

Due to the film's success André Hunebelle directed three more swashbuckler films (Le Bossu, Captain Blood and Le Miracle des loups) and hereby established Jean Marais as a fixture for this genre.
