= House on the Waterfront =

1955 film

- Directed by: Edmond T. Gréville
- Written by: Jacques Viot
- Produced by: Eugène Tucherer
- Starring: Jean Gabin; Andrée Debar; Henri Vidal
- Cinematography: Henri Alekan
- Edited by: Ginette Boudet; Jean Ravel
- Music by: Joseph Kosma
- Production company: Élysée Films
- Distributed by: Les Films Corona
- Release date: 15 April 1955
- Running time: 94 minutes
- Country: France
- Language: French

House on the Waterfront (French: Port du désir) is a 1955 French drama film directed by Edmond T. Gréville and starring Jean Gabin, Andrée Debar and Henri Vidal. It was made at the Billancourt Studios with some location filming in Marseille. The film's sets were designed by Lucien Aguettand. Although completed in 1954, it wasn't released until the following year.

== Synopsis ==
In Marseille, Captain Lequévic is ordered to refloat a ship that has sunk in the entrance to the harbor. However its owner, a man mixed up in smuggling and other illegal activities, is desperate to prevent him from doing so.

== Partial cast ==
- Jean Gabin as Le commandant Lequévic
- Andrée Debar as Martine
- Henri Vidal as Michel
- Edith Georges as Lola
- Leopoldo Francés as Baba
- René Sarvil as L'aveugle
- Gaby Basset as Madame Aimée
- Jacques Dynam as Le Meur
- Gaston Orbal as Rossignol
- Edmond Ardisson as Le patron de la boîte
- Mireille Ozy as Gaby
- Annette Maistre as Une entraîneuse
- Yôko Tani as Une entraîneuse
- Raymond Blot
- Robert Berri as Frédo, le malfrat
- Antonin Berval as Léon
- Jean-Roger Caussimon as Monsieur Black

== Bibliography ==
- Marcelline Block. World Film Locations: Marseilles. Intellect Books, 2013.
