= The Angel of the Alps =

1957 film directed by Carlo Campogalliani

- Directed by: Carlo Campogalliani
- Written by: Carlo Campogalliani; Roberto Gianviti; Carolina Invernizio (novel); Carlo Veo
- Produced by: Federico Galliani
- Starring: Luisella Boni; Alberto Farnese; Gino Sinimberghi
- Cinematography: Arturo Gallea
- Edited by: Otello Colangeli
- Music by: Giovanni Fusco
- Production company: Prora Industrie Cinematografiche e dello Spettacolo
- Release date: 1957
- Running time: 93 minutes
- Country: Italy
- Language: Italian

The Angel of the Alps (Italian: L'angelo delle Alpi) is a 1957 Italian historical melodrama film directed by Carlo Campogalliani and starring Luisella Boni, Alberto Farnese and Gino Sinimberghi.

The film's art direction was by Giancarlo Bartolini Salimbeni.

== Cast ==
- Luisella Boni as Rina
- Alberto Farnese as Massimo
- Gino Sinimberghi as Banchiere Maffei
- Cristina Grado as Laura
- Germana Paolieri as Contessa Bianca di Roverbella
- Nico Pepe as Gaspare
- Mario Ferrari as conte Roverbella
- Isabella Riva as donna Clotilde
- Giulio Falcier as Fabrizio
- Luisa Mattioli as Maddalena
- Vittorio Manfrino
- Alberto Archetti
- Alfredo Beduschi
- Lucetta Prona

== Bibliography ==
- Goble, Alan (1999). The Complete Index to Literary Sources in Film. Walter de Gruyter. ISBN 978-3-11-095194-3.
