= Renato De Carmine =

Italian actor (1923–2010)

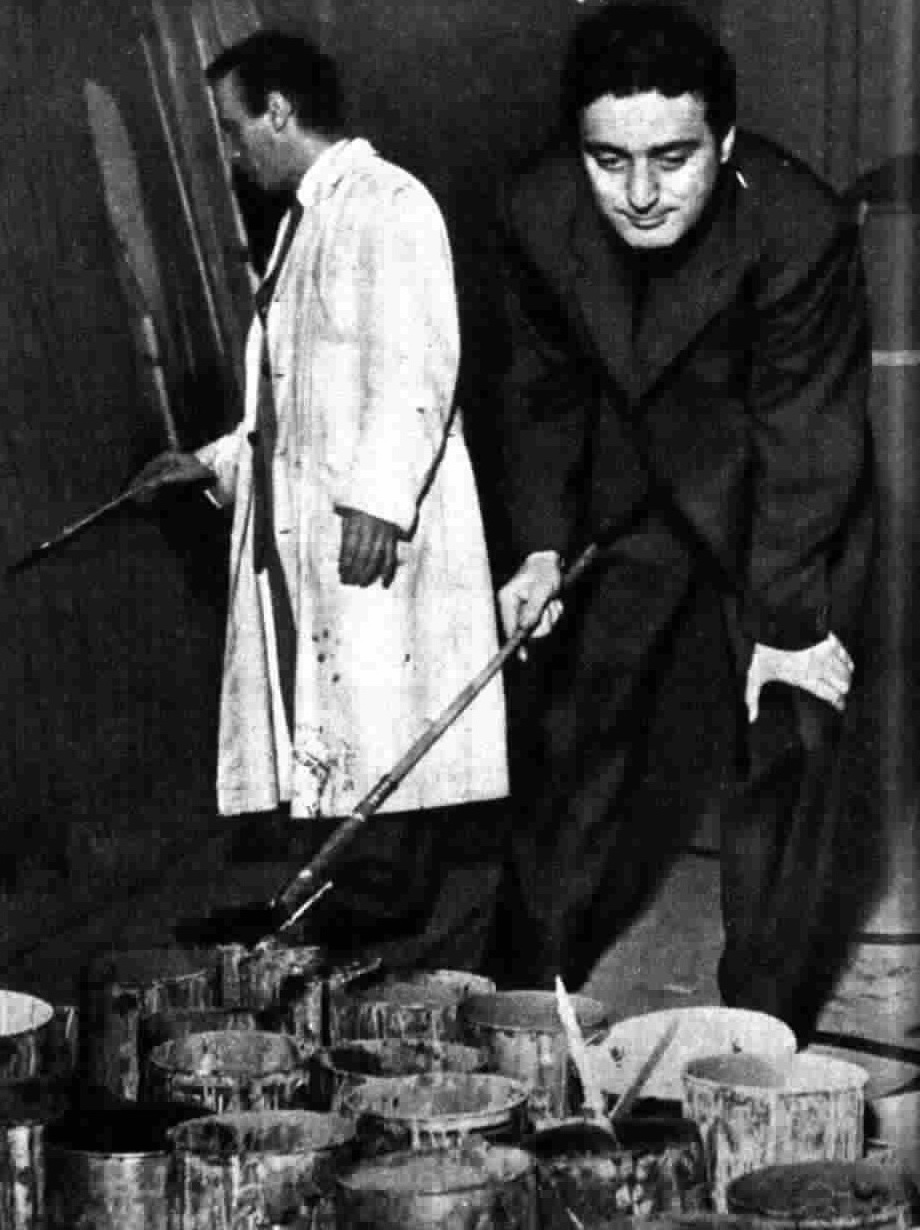
- De Carmine in Radiocorriere magazine, 1954
- Born: 25 January 1923; Rome, Lazio, Italy
- Died: 18 July 2010 (aged 87); Rome, Lazio, Italy
- Occupation: Actor
- Years active: 1948–2009 (film)

Renato De Carmine (25 January 1923 – 18 July 2010) was an Italian stage, film and television actor. After graduating at the Accademia Nazionale di Arte Drammatica Silvio D'Amico, De Carmine worked mainly on stage, notably at the Piccolo Teatro in Milan under the direction of Giorgio Strehler. He also appeared in more than seventy films and television series and TV-movies, including Lucio Fulci's The Return of White Fang (1974). He died of acute anemia.

== Selected filmography ==
- Hand of Death (1949)
- William Tell (1949)
- Mistress of the Mountains (1950)
- Captain Demonio (1950)
- Milady and the Musketeers (1952)
- Charge of the Black Lancers (1962)
- Angelique and the Sultan (1968)
- Crimes of the Black Cat (1972)
- The Return of White Fang (1974)
- Allonsanfàn (1974)
- Devils of Monza (1987)
- The Story of a Poor Young Man (1995)
