= Maurice Teynac =

French actor (1915–1992)

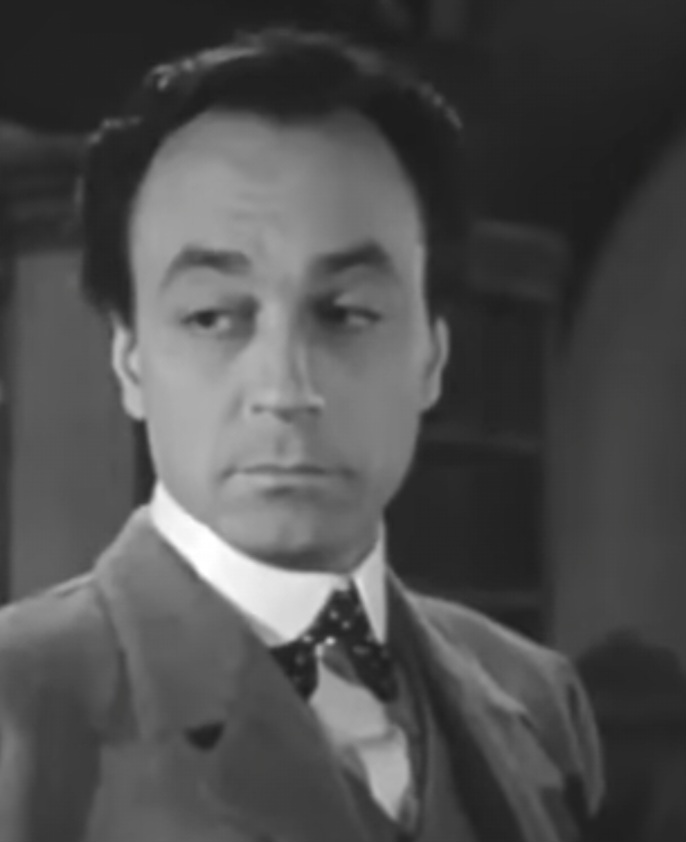
- Teynac in an episode of Sherlock Holmes (1954)
- Born: Maurice Emmanuel Marie Garros; 8 August 1915; Paris, France
- Died: 28 March 1992 (aged 76); Paris, France
- Occupation: Actor
- Years active: 1941–1985

Maurice Teynac (8 August 1915 – 28 March 1992) was a French actor. In 1948 he starred in the film The Lame Devil under Sacha Guitry.

In 1954 he appeared in London's West End in J.B. Priestley's poorly reviewed play The White Countess.

== Selected filmography ==
- Romance of Paris (1941)- Maurice
- The Pavilion Burns (1941)
- Opéra-musette (1942) - Leroy
- Le Destin fabuleux de Désirée Clary (1942) - Marmont
- My Last Mistress (1943) - L'imitateur
- Song of the Clouds (1946)
- Counter Investigation (1947) - Serge de Souquières
- Criminal Brigade (1947) - Fred
- La Fleur de l'âge (1947)
- Le Comédien (1948) - L'auteur dramatique
- Woman Without a Past (1948) - Chimerowitz
- Night Express (1948) - Georges Sommer
- The Lame Devil (1948) - Charles X
- Fantomas Against Fantomas (1949) - Fantômas
- The Barton Mystery (1949) - Barton
- On demande un assassin (1949) - Freville
- Mystery in Shanghai (1950) - Inspecteur Wens
- Les mousquetaires du roi (1951)
- The Red Rose (1951) - Jean Maréchal - le cinéaste
- Night Without Stars (1951) - Louis Malinay
- Au fil des ondes (1951)
- La Poison (1951) - Un avocat (uncredited)
- Massacre in Lace (1952) - Sophocle Zélos
- Full House (1952) - Heldinge (segment "Le mort dans l'ascenseur")
- The Road to Damascus (1952) - Le Christ
- Illusion in a Minor Key (1952) - Night Club Singer Herr Gidou
- My Childish Father (1953) - Lucien Landier
- Cinema d'altri tempi (1953) - Za l'Amour
- Royal Affairs in Versailles (1954) - Monsieur de Montespan (uncredited)
- The Beautiful Otero (1954) - Mountfeller
- La Soupe à la grimace (1954) - Dr. Curtiss
- Napoléon (1955) - Le comte Emmanuel de Las Cases
- Bedevilled (1955) - Trevelle
- The Affair of the Poisons (1955) - Nicolas de la Reynie
- Les insoumises (1956) - René Perrault
- Zaza (1956) - Bernard Dufresnes
- The Seventh Commandment (1957) - Labaroche
- Love in Jamaica (1957)
- The Suspects (1957) - Kurt Topfer
- The Mysteries of Paris (1957)
- Paris Holiday (1958) - Doctor Bernais
- Sans famille (1958) - James Milligan
- Monsieur Suzuki (1960) - Le virtuose
- Crack in the Mirror (1960) - Doctor
- Austerlitz (1960) - Schulmeister
- La Mort de Belle (1961) - L'ivrogne / Stephane's Friend
- Captain Fracasse (1961) - Marquis des Bruyères
- L'assassin est dans l'annuaire (1962) - Levasseur
- Le Diable et les Dix Commandements (1962) - Father Superior (segment "Homicide point ne seras")
- The Gypsy Baron (1962) - Carnero
- The Merry Widow (1962) - André Napoleon Renard
- The Trial (1962) - Deputy Manager
- Une blonde comme ça (1963)
- The Reluctant Spy (1963) - Alfred Thirios
- L'honorable Stanislas, agent secret (1963) - Alfred Thirios
- In the French Style (1963) - Baron Edward de Chassier
- Henri-Georges Clouzot's Inferno (1964) - M. Bordure
- Sursis pour un espion (1965) - L'inspecteur Legris
- The Uninhibited (1965) - Reginald
- The Night of the Generals (1967) - A General (uncredited)
- Trois filles vers le soleil (1968) - Le patron
- Therese and Isabelle (1968) - Monsieur Martin
- La Louve solitaire (1968) - Stanmore
- Mayerling (1968) - Moritz Szeps
- Les Aventures de Tom Sawyer (1968, TV miniseries) - Mr. Dobbins, Teacher
- State of Siege (1972) - Minister of Internal Security
- The Day of the Jackal (1973) - Bastien-Thiry's Lawyer
- Ash Wednesday (1973) - Doctor Lambert
- Le Chaud Lapin (1974) - Un comédien dans 'Protée'
- Special Section (1975) - Le substitut général Lucien Guillet
- Barry of the Great St. Bernard (1977) - Prior
- L'Année sainte (1976) - Marcel Scandini
- Birgitt Haas Must Be Killed (1981) - Chamrode
- L'ami de Vincent (1983) - Spencer
- Camille (1984) (TV film) - Joseph

== Bibliography ==
- Wearing, J.P. The London Stage 1950-1959: A Calendar of Productions, Performers, and Personnel. Rowman & Littlefield, 2014.
