= Adele Garavaglia =

Italian stage and film actress

- Born: 15 April 1869; Turin, Piedmont, Kingdom of Italy
- Died: 11 March 1944 (aged 74); Rome, Lazio, Kingdom of Italy
- Occupation: Actress
- Years active: 1913–1944 (film)

Adele Garavaglia (15 April 1869 – 11 March 1944) was an Italian stage and film actress.

== Filmography ==
Year	Title	Role	Notes
1913	I diavoli neri		
1914	I naufraghi		
1915	La sfinge		
1917	Lotta d'elementi, raffiche d'anime		
1917	Graziella		
1917	La figlia del mare		
1917	Il ventre di Parigi		
1918	Le due Marie		
1919	La casa che brucia		
1920	Fiamma velata		
1921	Monique		
1935	Golden Arrow	La madre del macchinista	
1936	Pierpin		
1936	Amore		
1936	Ginevra degli Almieri		Uncredited
1937	These Children	Ninetta	
1937	The Former Mattia Pascal	Angelica Bonafede Pascal	
1939	La voce senza volto	La madre di Gino	
1939	The Sons of the Marquis Lucera	La nonna	
1939	Follie del secolo	Zia Clorinda	
1939	Il ladro	La madre di Nelly	
1939	The Document		
1940	Arditi civili		
1940	Ecco la radio!		
1940	Il ponte dei sospiri	Angiola	
1940	Incanto di mezzanotte	Rosa	
1940	The Siege of the Alcazar	Zia Dolores	
1940	Piccolo alpino	La nonna di Rico	
1941	La forza bruta	La suora dell'ospedale	
1941	Idyll in Budapest		
1941	Piccolo mondo antico	La signora Teresa Rigey	
1941	The Iron Crown		Uncredited
1941	Blood Wedding	Gliceria, la comare	
1941	Don Buonaparte	Maria	
1941	The King's Jester	Costanza - la governante	
1942	The Jester's Supper	La nonna di Elisabetta	Uncredited
1942	A Garibaldian in the Convent	Nunziata, la domestica della marchesa	Uncredited
1942	The Two Orphans	Suor Genoveffa	
1942	M.A.S.	La madre di Lisca	
1942	Le vie del cuore		
1942	Il romanzo di un giovane povero	Giovanna, l'anziana damigella	
1942	Odessa in Flames	La nonna del bambino malato	Uncredited
1943	The White Angel	Zia Agata	
1943	Il treno crociato	La nonnina al ricovero	Uncredited
1943	Special Correspondents	La signora del telegrafo	
1943	Rita of Cascia		Uncredited
1944	Tre ragazze cercano marito	Maddalena	
1944	Mist on the Sea	La governante di Leonardo	
1945	No Turning Back	La direttrice dell'istituto Grimaldi	
1945	The Ten Commandments		(segment "Non nominare il nome di Dio invano")
1945	Lettere al sottotenente		
1946	La sua strada		(final film role)

== Bibliography ==
- Bert Cardullo. Vittorio De Sica: Director, Actor, Screenwriter. McFarland, 2002.
