= Juliette, or Key of Dreams =

1950 film

- Directed by: Marcel Carné
- Written by: Georges Neveux; Jacques Viot; Marcel Carné; Georges Neveux
- Starring: Gérard Philipe
- Cinematography: Henri Alekan
- Edited by: Léonide Azar
- Release date: 18 May 1951
- Running time: 106 minutes
- Country: France
- Language: French
- Box office: 513,083 admissions (France)

Juliette, or Key of Dreams (French: Juliette ou la Clé des songes) is a 1951 French drama film directed by Marcel Carné. It was entered into the 1951 Cannes Film Festival. The film is based on a play by Georges Neveux.

== Cast ==
- Gérard Philipe as Michel Grandier
- Suzanne Cloutier as Juliette
- Jean-Roger Caussimon as Le châtelain & Monsieur Bellanger (as J.R. Caussimon)
- René Génin as Le père Lajeunesse & le greffier
- Roland Lesaffre as Le légionnaire
- Gabrielle Fontan as La patronne de la confiserie
- Pierre Vernier as a young man selling keepsakes
- Arthur Devère as Le marchand de souvenirs (as Arthur Devere)
- Louise Fouquet as La compagne du légionnaire
- Martial Rèbe as L'employé (as Martial Rebbe)
- Marion Delbo as L'accorte ménagère
- Fernand René as Le facteur
- Marcelle Arnold as La femme acariâtre
