= Night Express (film) =

1948 film

- Directed by: Marcel Blistène
- Written by: René Jolivet; Jacques Viot
- Produced by: Roger Ribadeau-Dumas
- Starring: Roger Pigaut; Sophie Desmarets; Paul Demange
- Cinematography: Charles Bauer
- Edited by: Raymond Louveau
- Music by: Marcel Stern
- Production company: Société Française de Cinématographie
- Distributed by: La Société des Films Sirius
- Release date: 19 September 1948
- Running time: 80 minutes
- Country: France
- Language: French

Night Express (French: Rapide de nuit) is a 1948 French crime drama film directed by Marcel Blistène and starring Roger Pigaut, Sophie Desmarets and Paul Demange. The film's sets were designed by the art director Jacques Colombier.

== Synopsis ==
A woman tricks an apparently naïve young man into carrying a suitcase full of stolen goods into a railway station. The young man substitutes the case for another, however, to avoid being an accomplice.

== Cast ==
- Roger Pigaut as Robert
- Sophie Desmarets as Simone
- Paul Demange as M. Grand
- Jean Brochard as L'inspecteur Verdier
- Jane Marken as Mme Louis
- Maurice Teynac as Georges Sommer
- Michel Ardan as Un des deux complices
- Paul Azaïs as Un inspecteur
- Hélène Dassonville as La caissière
- Louis Florencie as Le garçon
- Gabrielle Fontan as La mère aux chats
- Jean Gaven as Un des deux complices
- Henry Murray as Le directeur

== Bibliography ==
- Bessy, Maurice & Chirat, Raymond. Histoire du cinéma français: encyclopédie des films, 1940–1950. Pygmalion, 1986
