= L' Amore di Norma =

1950 film

- Directed by: Giuseppe De Martino
- Written by: Giuseppe De Martino
- Produced by: Mario Trombetti
- Starring: Lori Landi
- Cinematography: Renato Del Frate
- Edited by: Renzo Lucidi
- Music by: Giuseppe Morelli
- Distributed by: Aster Laura Film
- Release date: 5 May 1951
- Country: Italy
- Language: Italian

L' Amore di Norma is a 1951 Italian musical film drama directed and written by Giuseppe De Martino. The film stars Lori Landi and Gino Mattera.

== Cast ==
- Lori Landi as Norma Randi
- Gino Mattera as Stefano Silva
- Jacqueline Pierreux as Jeannette
- Franca Mazzoni as Zia Francesca
- Afro Poli as Marco
- Germaine Del Signore as Miss Madison
- Gabriele Testas as Narciso
- Guido Celano as D'Emilis
- T. Germi
- Tony D'Angelo
- Carlo Mazzoni
- Rossana Higgins
- Pina Malgarini
- Enrico Formichi
- Gipsy Kiss
- Paola Bertini
- Aldo Silvani
- Gino Del Signore
