= The Beautiful Otero =

1954 film

- Directed by: Richard Pottier
- Written by: Carolina Otero (memories); Marc-Gilbert Sauvajon; Jacques Sigurd
- Produced by: Emile Natan; Joseph Spigler
- Starring: María Félix; Jacques Berthier; Louis Seigner
- Cinematography: Michel Kelber
- Edited by: André Gaudier
- Music by: Georges Van Parys
- Production companies: Les Films Modernes; Industrie Cinematografiche Sociali; Cine Produzione Astoria; CIRAC
- Distributed by: Compagnie Commerciale Française Cinématographique (France)
- Release date: 5 November 1954
- Running time: 92 minutes
- Countries: France; Italy
- Language: French

The Beautiful Otero (French: La belle Otero, Italian: La bella Otero) is a 1954 French-Italian historical drama film directed by Richard Pottier and starring María Félix, Jacques Berthier and Louis Seigner. It is based on the story of the nineteenth century Spanish dancer and courtesan Caroline Otéro. Filming took place at the Joinville Studios and Saint-Maurice Studios in Paris. It was shot in Eastmancolor. The film's sets were designed by the art director Robert Gys.

== Cast ==
- María Félix as Caroline Otéro
- Jacques Berthier as Jean Chastaing
- Louis Seigner as L'imprésario Robert Martel
- Marie Sabouret as Diane de Nemours
- Paolo Stoppa as Frédéric
- Jean-Marc Tennberg as Morillon
- Maurice Teynac as Mountfeller
- Jean Pâqui as D'Herbecourt
- Micheline Gary as Eglantine
- Nerio Bernardi as Le grand-duc
- José Torres as Pablo
- Alain Bouvette as Un spectateur au Kursaal
- Gisèle Grandpré as La présentatrice
- Jacqueline Marbaux as Lucie

== Bibliography ==
- Tom Brown & Belén Vidal. The Biopic in Contemporary Film Culture. Routledge, 2013.
