= Hand of Death (1949 film) =

1950 film by Carlo Campogalliani

- Film poster
- Directed by: Carlo Campogalliani
- Written by: Carlo Campogalliani; Carolina Invernizio (novel); Vittorio Nino Novarese; Paola Ojetti
- Produced by: Giorgio Venturini
- Starring: María Martín; Adriano Rimoldi; Carlo Ninchi
- Cinematography: Tonino Delli Colli
- Edited by: Loris Bellero; Luigi Giachino
- Music by: Giovanni Fusco
- Production company: Icet
- Distributed by: Icet
- Release date: 1949
- Running time: 90 minutes
- Country: Italy
- Language: Italian

Hand of Death or Man of Death (Italian: La mano della morta) is a 1949 Italian historical melodrama film directed by Carlo Campogalliani and starring María Martín, Adriano Rimoldi and Carlo Ninchi. It was shot at the Icet Studios in Milan.

== Cast ==
- María Martín as Satanella
- Adriano Rimoldi as conte Orazio Altieri
- Carlo Ninchi as Simone Bossi
- Renato De Carmine as Flavio Altieri
- Germana Paolieri as contessa Altieri
- Saro Urzì as zingaro Marco
- Marisa Mari as Lucia Altieri
- Ernesto Sabbatini
- Raffaele Pindinelli as usuraio Schultz
- Domenico Viglione Borghese
- Lina Volonghi as Carmela Caputo
- Marcello Giorda as Direttore d'orchestra
- Fernando Farese as Fernando Tibaldi
- Silvio Bagolini as Ufficiale
- Tina Spezia as Evelina
- Gianni Guarnieri as impresario Gemelli
- Nerio Bernardi as senatore Tibaldi
- Alberto Archetti
- Gianni Cavalieri
- Egisto Olivieri
- Silvana Calvi
- Arrigo Peri
- Giuliana Pinelli
- Nera Bruni
- Darma Doriano
- Ernesto Nelli

== Bibliography ==
- Bayman, Louis. The Operatic and the Everyday in Postwar Italian Film Melodrama. Edinburgh University Press, 2014.
