= The Daughter of Hamburg =

- Directed by: Yves Allégret
- Written by: Frédéric Dard; José Bénazéraf; Yves Allégret; Maurice Aubergé
- Produced by: José Bénazéraf; Georges Glass
- Starring: Daniel Gélin; Hildegard Knef; Jean Lefebvre
- Cinematography: Armand Thirard
- Edited by: Claude Nicole
- Music by: Jean Ledrut
- Production companies: Films Univers; Société Nouvelle Pathé Cinéma
- Distributed by: Pathé Consortium Cinéma
- Release date: 13 August 1958
- Running time: 86 minutes
- Country: France
- Language: French

The Daughter of Hamburg (French: La Fille de Hambourg, German Das Mädchen aus Hamburg) is a 1958 French drama film directed by Yves Allégret and starring Hildegarde Neff, Daniel Gélin and Jean Lefebvre. Location shooting took place around Hamburg, particularly around the red light district of St. Pauli.

== Synopsis ==
When a French merchant ship arrives at the Port of Hamburg, the sailor Pierre searches for the young local woman he had once known in the city. He recalls the romance they had together when he was prisoner of war in the city during the Second World War. Eventually he finds her working in a nightclub.

== Cast ==
- Daniel Gélin as Pierre
- Hildegarde Neff as Maria
- Jean Lefebvre as Georges
- Daniel Sorano as Jean-Marie
- Frédéric O'Brady as Barman
- Reiner Brönneke as Pimp at Bar
- Bob Iller as Patron Sponging the Wrestling Winner
- Günther Jerschke as Heindrick the Patron Calling Gilda
- Kurt Klopsch as Julius the Cabaret Owner
- Maya Merlin as Mud Wrestler
- Reinhold Nietschmann as Aged Patron at Bar
- Karin Volkert as Blonde at Bar

== Censorship ==
When the film was first released in Italy in 1960 (Italian title: La Ragazza Di Amburgo) the Committee for the Theatrical Review of the Italian Ministry of Cultural Heritage and Activities rated the film not suitable for children under 16. The reason for the age restriction, cited in the official documents, is the presence of several scenes considered to be inappropriate to the sensitivity of a minor. For the film to be screened publicly, the Committee recommended the removal of the scene in which Pierre and Maria are in bed and he is sensually kissing her on the neck. The committee considered this scene offensive to decency and morality. The official document number is: 31890, it was signed on 6 May 1960 by Minister Domenico Magrì.

== Bibliography ==
- Broadbent, Philip & Hake, Sabine. Berlin Divided City, 1945-1989. Berghahn Books, 2010.
