= Frou-Frou (film) =

1955 film directed by Augusto Genina

- Directed by: Augusto Genina
- Written by: A. E. Carr; Cécil Saint-Laurent
- Based on: Frou-Frou by Jacques Laurent
- Produced by: Gamma Film (France)
- Starring: Dany Robin; Louis de Funès
- Cinematography: Henri Alekan
- Edited by: Augusto Genina
- Music by: Louiguy
- Distributed by: Gamma Film
- Release date: 19 July 1955 (France)
- Running time: 112 minutes
- Countries: France; Italy
- Language: Italian
- Box office: $17.3 million

Frou-Frou is a French comedy film from 1955, directed by Augusto Genina, written by A. E. Carr, starring Dany Robin and Louis de Funès. The film is also known as "A Girl from Paris".

== Plot ==
Frou-Frou is a 16-year-old peddler. She comes to the attention of four gentlemen who, Pygmalion-like, agree on helping her to improve her situation. They teach her to behave like a lady and introduce her to the upper class. But she falls in love with an unsuccessful artist who commits suicide after he has befathered her with a daughter...

== Cast ==
- Dany Robin as Antoinette Dubois called "Frou-Frou"
- Louis de Funès as Colonel Cousinet-Duval, one of Frou-Frou's mentors
- Gino Cervi as Prince Vladimir Bilinsky, one of Frou-Frou's mentors
- Philippe Lemaire as Michel Arthus, the young painter
- Ivan Desny as Henri de Gaspard, Frou-Frou's first lover
- Mischa Auer as Grand duke Alexis
- Jean Wall as Jean Sabatier, one of Frou-Frou's mentors
- Umberto Menalti as Count Sigismond Meursault, one of Frou-Frou's mentors
- Daniel Ceccaldi as Chevalier des Grieux, the young man at the masked ball
- Marie Sabouret as Grande duchess Anna Ivanovna, keeper of a Russian restaurant
- Béatrice Arnac as Rosemonde
- Simone Sylvestre as Ketty
- Mylène Demongeot as The mistress
- Isabelle Pia as Michèle Dubois, Frou-Frou's daughter
