= The White Countess (play) =

1954 play

- Original language: English
- Written by: J.B. Priestley; Jacquetta Hawkes
- Genre: Drama

Premiere
- Date: 16 February 1954
- Place: Gaiety Theatre, Dublin

The White Countess is a 1954 play by J.B. Priestley and his wife Jacquetta Hawkes.

It was first staged at the Gaiety Theatre in Dublin before transferring to London's West End. However, it ran for only five performances at the Saville Theatre before closing. The production was savaged by most critics, although the reviewer of the New Statesman defended it. The cast included Maurice Teynac and Viveca Lindfors, making her West End debut.

== Bibliography ==
- Wearing, J.P. The London Stage 1950-1959: A Calendar of Productions, Performers, and Personnel. Rowman & Littlefield, 2014.
