= Armando Francioli =

Italian actor (1919–2020)

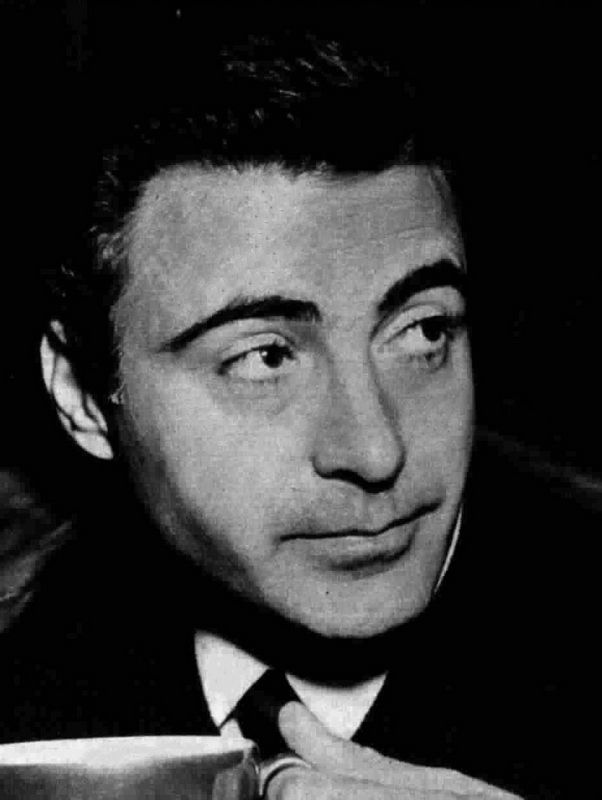
- Born: 21 October 1919; Rome, Italy
- Died: 6 April 2020 (aged 100); Rome, Italy
- Occupation: Actor
- Years active: 1942–1993

Armando Francioli (21 October 1919 – 6 April 2020) was an Italian actor. He appeared in over 50 films since 1942.

== Filmography ==
Year	Title	Role	Notes
1942	A Pistol Shot	Un amico di Sergio	Uncredited
1942	Don Cesare di Bazan	Un nobile cavaliere	Uncredited
1943	C'è sempre un ma!	Fabrizio	
1946	O sole mio		
1946	The Black Eagle	Amico di Vladimiro	
1947	The Opium Den	Corrado Vidonis	
1947	The Courier of the King	Norbert de la Mole	
1947	The White Devil	Wassili	
1948	L'ebreo errante	David	
1950	Paolo e Francesca	Paolo Malatesta	
1951	Double Cross	Stefano Soldani	
1951	Beauties in Capri	Gennaro	
1952	Rome 11:00	Romoletto	
1952	Wife For a Night	Enrico Belli	
1952	Milady and the Musketeers	Herbert de la Salle	
1952	Cats and Dogs	Sandro	
1952	Prisoners of Darkness	Oliviero Pisani	
1953	The Merchant of Venice	Bassanio	
1953	I Piombi di Venezia	Tintoretto	
1953	Traviata '53	Carlo Rivelli	
1954	Il cavaliere di Maison Rouge	Cap. Maurice Lindet	
1954	The King's Prisoner	Roland	
1954	Queen Margot	Joseph Peyrac La Môle / Duke of Mole	
1954	Se vincessi cento milioni	Mario	(segment "L'indossatrice")
1954	Farewell, My Beautiful Lady	Guido	
1954	Due soldi di felicità	Sandro Roberti	
1955	Barber of Seville	Il Conte di Almaviva	
1955	Il piccolo vetraio	Enrico	
1956	La mia vita è tua	Marco Ridolfi	
1960	The Pharaohs' Woman	Ramses prince of Thebes	
1962	Hawk of the Caribbean	Esteban	
1966	L'homme de Mykonos	Kyriados	
1968	Il marchio di Kriminal	Robson	
1968	Tower of Screaming Virgins	Orsini	
1970	La Horse	Francis	
1970	Bolidi sull'asfalto a tutta birra!	Father of Gio'	
1970	Êtes-vous fiancée à un marin grec ou à un pilote de ligne ?	Jean Andrieux – le photographe	
1977	Spia – Il Paso Philby		TV Movie
1982	Ahi giovinezza giovinezza		TV Movie
1984	Nata d'amore	Professor Fossani	1 episode
1984	Everybody in Jail	Enrico Patellaro	
1992	Ostinato Destino	Butler	
1993	Berlin '39	Ludwig	(final film role)
