= Elena Zareschi =

Italian stage, television and film actress

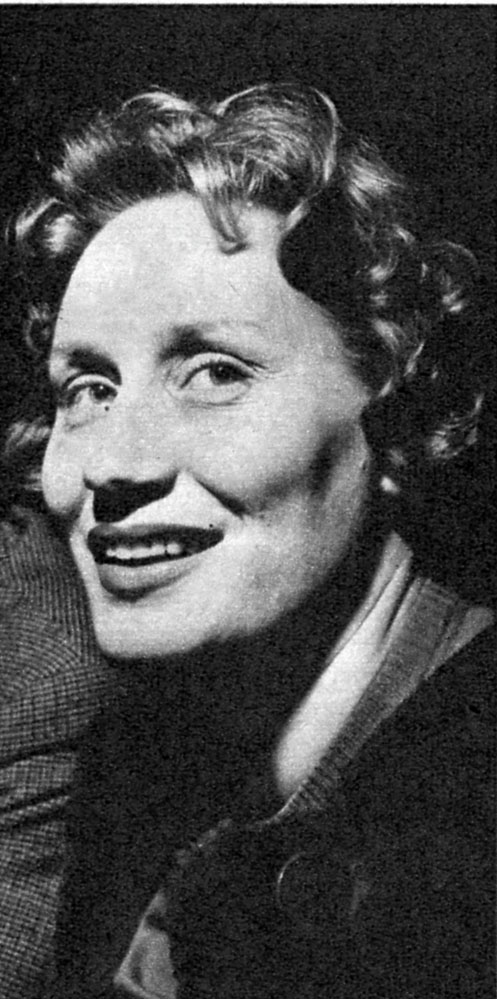
- Born: Elina Lazzareschi; 23 July 1916; Buenos Aires, Argentina
- Died: 31 July 1999 (aged 83); Lucca, Italy
- Occupation: Actress

Elena Zareschi (23 July 1916 – 31 July 1999) was an Italian stage, television and film actress.

== Life and career ==
Born Elina Lazzareschi in Buenos Aires to Italian parents from Lucca, Zareschi moved to Rome in the mid-1930s and enrolled at the Centro Sperimentale di Cinematografia, graduating in 1937. In the same year, she made her film debut in the drama L’ultima nemica. While she had few opportunities in films, Zareschi was very active on stage, where she debuted in 1939, as well as in television films and series.

== Partial filmography ==
- Everybody's Woman (1934)
- The Last Enemy (1938)
- Ultima giovinezza (1939) – Yvonne
- Sei bambine ed il Perseo (1940) – Vivalda
- L'ultima nemica (1940) – Isa Fleur
- Merchant of Slaves (1942) – Francesca
- M.A.S. (1942) – L'attrice, amica di Brera
- Don Giovanni (1942) – Elvira
- Jealousy (1942) – Zosima Munoz
- Rita of Cascia (1943) – Rita da Cascia
- Peccatori (1945)
- I contrabbandieri del mare (1948) – Stella
- The Earth Cries Out (1949) – Ada
- Shadows on the Grand Canal (1951)
- Ulysses (1954) – Cassandra
- Il conte Aquila (1955) – Imperatrice Austriaca
- The Mysteries of Paris (1957) – Matilde
- Herod the Great (1959) – Alexandra
- Le sorprese dell'amore (1959) – Carlotta
- The Cossacks (1960) – Patima
- The Warrior Empress (1960) – Sibilla
- Silver Spoon Set (1960) – Actress (uncredited)
- Minotaur, the Wild Beast of Crete (1960) – Queen Pasifae
- Invasion 1700 (1962) – Princess Kinzevich
- Un colpo al cuore (1970)
- La lunga ombra del lupo (1971) – Countess Balestrieri
