= Jacques Viot (writer) =

French writer

- Born: 20 November 1898; Nantes, Loire-Atlantique, France
- Died: 29 January 1973 (aged 74); Nantes, Loire-Atlantique, France
- Education: HEC Paris
- Occupation: Writer
- Years active: 1935–1964 (film)

Jacques Viot (French: [ʒak vjo]; 1898–1973) was a French novelist and screenwriter.

After service in the artillery during the First World War he became involved with the Surrealist movement. From the mid-1930s he began working on screenplays, collaborating with directors such as Marcel Carne, Jacques Feyder and Marcel Camus.

After the war, he enrolled at HEC Paris where he obtained a diploma, then worked in an insurance firm in Nantes.

== Selected filmography ==
- Beautiful Days (1935)
- Under Western Eyes (1936)
- People Who Travel (1938)
- The Tamer (1938)
- Daybreak (1939)
- Carmen (1942)
- Marie-Martine (1943)
- The Ménard Collection (1944)
- Lunegarde (1946)
- Back Streets of Paris (1946)
- The Woman in Red (1947)
- The Long Night (1947)
- Night Express (1948)
- Juliette, or Key of Dreams (1951)
- The Call of Destiny (1953)
- The King's Prisoner (1954)
- The Air of Paris (1954)
- House on the Waterfront (1955)
- Black Orpheus (1959)

== Bibliography ==
- Crisp, Colin. French Cinema—A Critical Filmography: Volume 2, 1940–1958. Indiana University Press, 2015.
- Richardson, Michael. Surrealism and Cinema. Berg, 2006.
