= Blood Wedding (1941 film) =

- Directed by: Goffredo Alessandrini
- Written by: Lina Pietravalle; Vittorio Cottafavi; Gherardo Gherardi; Maria Stefan; Giuseppe Zucca; Goffredo Alessandrini
- Starring: Beatrice Mancini; Fosco Giachetti; Luisa Ferida; Nino Pavese
- Cinematography: Aldo Tonti
- Edited by: Giancarlo Cappelli
- Music by: Enzo Masetti
- Production company: Sovrania Film
- Distributed by: Variety Distribution
- Release date: 17 September 1941
- Running time: 85 minutes
- Country: Italy
- Language: Italian

Blood Wedding (Italian: Nozze di sangue) is a 1941 Italian drama film directed by Goffredo Alessandrini and starring Beatrice Mancini, Fosco Giachetti and Luisa Ferida. It is set in 19th century South America, and features an arranged marriage. The film is based on the novel Immacolata by Lina Pietravalle.

== Cast ==
- Beatrice Mancini as Immacolata
- Fosco Giachetti as Gidda
- Luisa Ferida as Nazaria
- Nino Pavese as Pietro
- Umberto Spadaro as Maso
- Adele Garavaglia as Gliceria, la comare
- Elio Marcuzzo as Angelo
- Felice Romano as Matteo
- Fedele Gentile as Raffaele
- Claudia Marti as Lina
- Giuseppe Bordonaro as Un boscaiolo
- Vasco Creti as Il padrone
- Achille Majeroni as L'affittuario della falegnameria
- Felice Minotti as Un boscaiolo
- Katiuscia Odinzova as La danzatrice
- Emilio Petacci as Lo sposo per procura
- Mirella Scriatto as La moglie di un boscaiolo
