= The Mysteries of Paris (1957 film) =

1957 film

- Directed by: Fernando Cerchio
- Written by: Bey Bourg; Damiano Damiani
- Based on: The Mysteries of Paris by Eugène Sue
- Produced by: Giampaolo Bigazzi
- Starring: Frank Villard; Yvette Lebon; Jacques Castelot
- Cinematography: Sergio Pesce
- Edited by: Maria Rosada
- Music by: Ezio Carabella; Giovanni Fusco
- Production companies: Comptoir Français du Film Production; Faro Film
- Distributed by: Variety Distribution
- Release date: 21 August 1957
- Running time: 94 minutes
- Countries: France; Italy
- Language: Italian

The Mysteries of Paris (French: Les mystères de Paris, Italian: I misteri di Parigi) is a 1957 French-Italian drama film directed by Fernando Cerchio and starring Frank Villard, Yvette Lebon and Jacques Castelot. It is based on the 1842 novel The Mysteries of Paris by Eugène Sue, one of a number of film adaptations of the work.

== Cast ==
- Frank Villard as Prince Rodolfo di Gerolstein
- Yvette Lebon as Sara, ex-moglie di Rodolfo
- Jacques Castelot as notaio Ferrand, ovvero 'Monsieur'
- Lorella De Luca as Maria, la Cantante
- Matteo Spinola as Germain
- John Kitzmiller as Lo Squartatore
- Giulio Battiferri as Georges
- Elena Zareschi as Matilde
- Clona Ristori as La Civetta
- Maurice Teynac
- Arturo Bragaglia
- Giulio Calì
- Olga Solbelli
- Umberto Sacripante
- Marianne Leibl
- Mino Loisi
- Giuseppe Lo Giudice
- Rita Toscano

== Bibliography ==
- Chiti, Roberto & Poppi, Roberto. Dizionario del cinema italiano: Dal 1945 al 1959. Gremese Editore, 1991.
- Goble, Alan. The Complete Index to Literary Sources in Film. Walter de Gruyter, 1999.
