= Giorgio Venturini =

Italian film producer

- Born: 1906
- Died: 15 March 1984 (aged 77–78); Rome, Lazio, Italy
- Other name: Giorgio Rivalta
- Occupations: Producer, director
- Years active: 1948–1983 (film)

Giorgio Venturini (1906–1984) was an Italian film producer. He also directed three films under the name Giorgio Rivalta.

== Selected filmography ==
- William Tell (1949)
- Hand of Death (1949)
- Mistress of the Mountains (1950)
- Captain Demonio (1950)
- The Mistress of Treves (1952)
- Milady and the Musketeers (1952)
- Son of the Hunchback (1952)
- The Merchant of Venice (1953)
- Black Devils of Kali (1954)
- The Treasure of Bengal (1954)
- The Widow (1955)
- The Pharaohs' Woman (1960)
- The Avenger (1962)
- A Queen for Caesar (1962)
- The Sex of Angels (1968)

Director (as Giorgio Rivalta)

- The King's Prisoner (1954)
- The Cossacks (1960)
- The Pharaohs' Woman (1960)

== Bibliography ==
- Bayman, Louis (ed.) Directory of World Cinema: Italy. Intellect Books, 2011.
