= Calafuria =

1943 film

- Directed by: Flavio Calzavara
- Written by: Flavio Calzavara; Delfino Cinelli
- Based on: Calafuria by Delfino Cinelli
- Produced by: Giovanni Addessi
- Starring: Doris Duranti; Gustav Diessl; Olga Solbelli
- Cinematography: Gábor Pogány
- Edited by: Ignazio Ferronetti
- Music by: Virgilio Doplicher
- Production company: Nazionalcine
- Distributed by: Nazionalcine
- Release date: 11 March 1943
- Running time: 81 minutes
- Country: Italy
- Language: Italian

Calafuria is a 1943 Italian drama film directed by Flavio Calzavara and starring Doris Duranti, Gustav Diessl and Olga Solbelli. It is based on the 1929 novel of the same title by Delfino Cinelli. It was shot at the Pisorno Studios in Tirrenia and on location around Florence and Livorno. The film's sets were designed by the art director Italo Cremona.

== Synopsis ==
One night in Florence, painter Tommaso rescues a young woman, Marta, who is being beaten in an alley. He takes her to his uncle's villa in the Calafuria area on the coast near Livorno. Although he discovers about her past as a prostitute he wishes to marry her when she falls pregnant with their child.

His uncle fiercely opposes the marriage, and a despairing Marta pretends to have committed suicide off the cliffs of Calafuria. She instead heads to Rome to give birth. Tommaso gives up all thoughts of her and volunteers for military service. He is badly wounded in action in the Second World War and his life is despaired of. However he wakes from surgery to find Marta and his young son there.

== Cast ==
- Doris Duranti as Marta Traversi
- Gustav Diessl as Tommaso Bardelli
- Olga Solbelli as Clara
- Rubi Dalma as Natalia
- Bella Starace Sainati as Giovanna Dini, l'ostetrica
- Aldo Silvani as Il signor John Jackson
- Lamberto Picasso as Il conte, padre di Natalia
- Giulio Battiferri as Michele
- Arturo Bragaglia as Nandino, il portiere dell' albergo

== Bibliography ==
- Borghini, Fabrizio, Guidi, Umberto and Sacchetti, Chiara. Livorno al cinema. Informazione, 1997.
- Goble, Alan. The Complete Index to Literary Sources in Film. Walter de Gruyter, 1999.
