= Beatrice Mancini =

Italian actress (1917–1987)

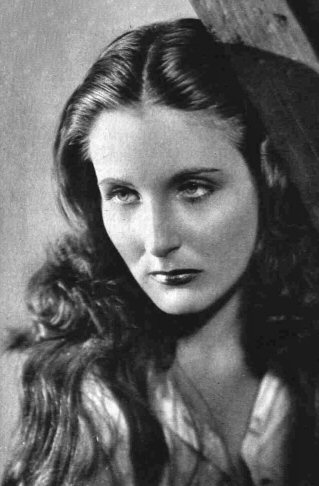
- Born: Bice Mancinotti; 7 December 1917; Rome, Kingdom of Italy
- Died: 1 March 1987 (aged 69); Rome, Italy
- Occupation: Actress
- Years active: 1935–1958

Beatrice Mancini (born Bice Mancinotti; 7 December 1917 – 1 March 1987) was an Italian actress. She starred in the 1941 film Blood Wedding.

Born Bice Mancinotti in Rome, Italy, Mancini studied at the Accademia Nazionale di Arte Drammatica Silvio D'Amico and made her film debut in 1935 in La capanna dell'amore, credited as Milva Vejo. She was often cast in roles of hapless, sensible and good-heart girls.

== Selected filmography ==
- The Anonymous Roylott (1936)
- Luciano Serra, Pilot (1938)
- Wealth Without a Future (1939)
- Big Shoes (1940)
- Caravaggio (1941)
- Blood Wedding (1941)
- Rita of Cascia (1943)
- The White Angel (1943)

== Bibliography ==
- Goble, Alan. The Complete Index to Literary Sources in Film. Walter de Gruyter, 1999.
