= Rita of Cascia (film) =

- Directed by: Antonio Leonviola
- Written by: Celestino Spada; Antonio Leonviola
- Starring: Elena Zareschi; Ugo Sasso; Beatrice Mancini; Marcello Giorda
- Cinematography: Giovanni Pucci
- Edited by: Gisa Radicchi Levi
- Music by: Pietro Sassoli
- Production company: Titanus
- Distributed by: Artisti Associati
- Release date: 31 May 1943
- Running time: 83 minutes
- Country: Italy
- Language: Italian

Rita of Cascia (Italian: Rita da Cascia) is a 1943 Italian historical film directed by Antonio Leonviola and starring Elena Zareschi, Ugo Sasso and Beatrice Mancini. It was made at the Farnesina Studios of Titanus in Rome. The film portrays the life of the Catholic saint Rita of Cascia.

== Cast ==
- Elena Zareschi as Rita da Cascia
- Ugo Sasso as Paolo di Ferdinando
- Beatrice Mancini as Ada
- Marcello Giorda as Antonio, il padre di Rita
- Laura Nucci as Jacoviella
- Augusto Marcacci as Il barone di Collegiacone
- Elodia Maresca as Amata
- Teresa Franchini as La madre superiore
- Stefano Sciaccaluga as Il pellegrino
- Giulio Battiferri as Lampo, il servo spia del barone
- Gian Paolo Rosmino as Frate Remigio
- Luigi Garrone as Il taverniere
- Umberto Spadaro as Il delatore nella taverna
- Giovanni Onorato as Un cliente nella taverna
- Amina Pirani Maggi as Una suora
- Nera Bruni as Un'altra suora
- Vittoria Mongardi as Una conversa
- Elio Marcuzzo as Gian Giacomo
- Aleardo Ward as Paolo Maria
- Umberto Leurini as Gian Giacomo da bambino
- Amedeo Leurini as Paolo Maria da bambino
- Adele Garavaglia
- Lamberto Picasso

== Plot ==
The film centers on the life of Saint Rita of Cascia during her marriage to Paolo di Ferdinando Mancini, her life in widowhood and the miracles that happened when she entered the Convento de Santa Magdalena in Cascia.

== Bibliography ==
- Nerenberg, Ellen Victoria. Prison Terms: Representing Confinement During and After Italian Fascism. University of Toronto Press, 2001.
