= Olga Solbelli =

Italian actress (1898–1976)

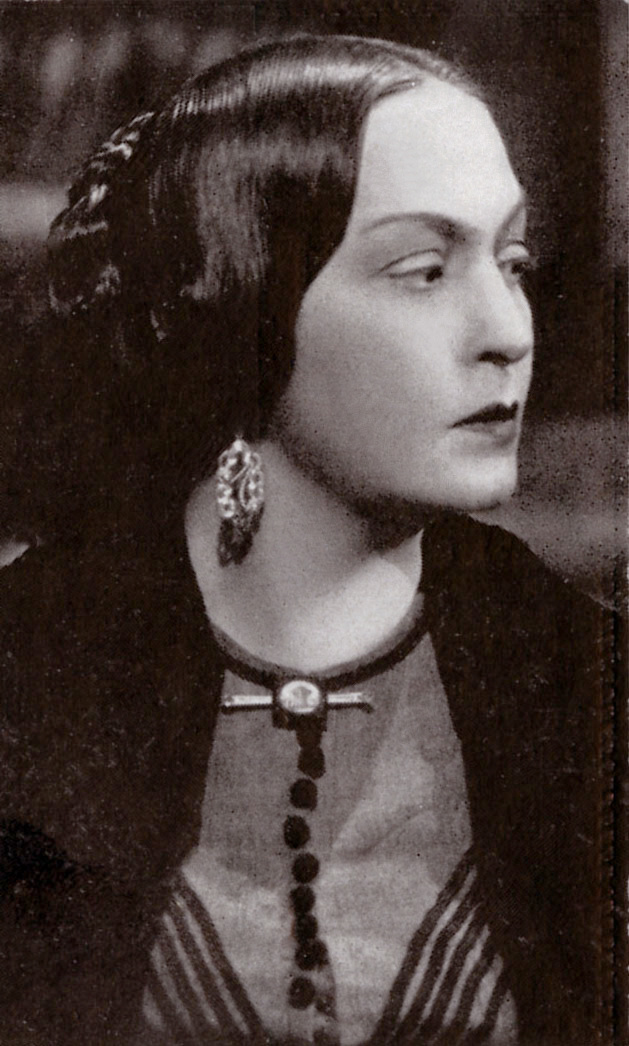
- Born: 11 May 1898; Verghereto, Italy
- Died: 8 September 1976 (aged 78); Bologna, Italy
- Occupation: Actress
- Years active: 1939-1967

Olga Solbelli (11 May 1898 – 8 September 1976) was an Italian film actress. She appeared in 81 films between 1939 and 1967. She was born in Verghereto and died in Bologna.

== Selected filmography ==
- The Anonymous Roylott (1936)
- The Former Mattia Pascal (1937)
- Unjustified Absence (1939)
- A Romantic Adventure (1940)
- The Sinner (1940)
- Schoolgirl Diary (1941)
- A Woman Has Fallen (1941)
- The Princess of Dreams (1942)
- Street of the Five Moons (1942)
- Odessa in Flames (1942)
- Apparition (1943)
- The Last Wagon (1943)
- The Peddler and the Lady (1943)
- A Living Statue (1943)
- Calafuria (1943)
- The Innkeeper (1944)
- The Materassi Sisters (1944)
- Romulus and the Sabines (1945)
- Lost in the Dark (1947)
- The Captain's Daughter (1947)
- The Wolf of the Sila (1949)
- Love and Poison (1950)
- The Cliff of Sin (1950)
- The Ungrateful Heart (1951)
- The Lovers of Ravello (1951)
- Tomorrow Is Another Day (1951)
- Nobody's Children (1951)
- The Man in My Life (1952)
- Brothers of Italy (1952)
- La pattuglia dell'Amba Alagi (1953)
- The Steel Rope (1953)
- The Merchant of Venice (1953)
- Theodora, Slave Empress (1954)
- The King's Prisoner (1954)
- The Lovers of Manon Lescaut (1954)
- Orient Express (1954)
- Barrier of the Law (1954)
- The White Angel (1955)
- The Mysteries of Paris (1957)
- Attack of the Moors (1959)
- Mill of the Stone Women (1960)
- Assault on the State Treasure (1967)
