= Milady and the Musketeers =

- Directed by: Vittorio Cottafavi
- Written by: Siro Angeli; Giorgio Capitani; Vittoriano Petrilli; Vittorio Cottafavi
- Based on: The Three Musketeers by Alexandre Dumas
- Produced by: Giorgio Venturini; Nino Martegani
- Starring: Rossano Brazzi; Yvette Lebon; Armando Francioli
- Cinematography: Vincenzo Seratrice
- Edited by: Renzo Lucidi
- Music by: Renzo Rossellini
- Production companies: Atlantis Film; Martegani Produzione; Venturini Film
- Distributed by: Comptoir Français du Film
- Release date: 23 October 1952
- Running time: 87 minutes
- Countries: France; Italy
- Language: Italian

Milady and the Musketeers (Italian: Il boia di Lilla, also known as Vengeance of the Musketeers and La vita avventurosa di Milady) is 1952 French-Italian historical adventure film directed by Vittorio Cottafavi and starring Rossano Brazzi, Yvette Lebon and Armando Francioli. It is based on the 1844 novel The Three Musketeers by Alexandre Dumas, and was a popular success.

The film's sets were designed by the art director Giancarlo Bartolini Salimbeni.

== Cast ==
- Rossano Brazzi as Count de la Fere aka Athos
- Yvette Lebon as Milady Anne
- Armando Francioli as Herbert de la Salle
- Maria Grazia Francia as Gisèle
- Nerio Bernardi as Porthos
- Massimo Serato as Rochefort
- Jean-Roger Caussimon as Mastro Pietro / Boia di Lilla
- Raymond Cordy as Nobile
- Enzo Fiermonte
- Vittorio Sanipoli
- Renato De Carmine

== Bibliography ==
- Moliterno, Gino. Historical Dictionary of Italian Cinema. Scarecrow Press, 2008.
