= This Age Without Pity =

1952 film

- Directed by: Marcel Blistène
- Written by: Pierre Apestéguy; André Leclerc
- Produced by: Léon Gouble
- Starring: Colette Darfeuil; André Alerme; Jean Tissier
- Cinematography: Raymond Clunie
- Edited by: Géran
- Music by: Georges Van Parys
- Production company: Pafico
- Distributed by: Codif
- Release date: 25 June 1952
- Running time: 85 minutes
- Country: France
- Language: French

This Age Without Pity (French: Cet âge est sans pitié) is a 1952 French comedy film directed by Marcel Blistène and starring Colette Darfeuil, André Alerme and Jean Tissier. It was shot using the Gevacolor process. It was filmed at the Victorine Studios in Nice and on location around Cannes and Tourrettes-sur-Loup on the French Riviera.

== Synopsis ==
Four university acting students decide to take a camping holiday. Their car breaks down near a village where a historical film is being shot by a celebrated director, and featuring the famous sex symbol Barbara Glamour.

== Cast ==
- Colette Darfeuil as Barbara Glamour, la star du film en tournage
- André Alerme as Boniface Médéric, le réalisateur du film
- Jean Tissier as Bigarreau, l'assistant-réalisateur
- José Noguero as Eduardo Tocata, le jeune premier
- Jean Vinci as André
- Jacques Famery as Léon,
- France Degand as Christiane
- Colette Deréal as Monique
- Paul Demange as l'opérateur

== Bibliography ==
- Bazin, André . Bazin on Global Cinema, 1948-1958. University of Texas Press, 2014.
- Rège, Philippe. Encyclopedia of French Film Directors, Volume 1. Scarecrow Press, 2009.
