= Yvette Lebon =

French actress (1910–2014)

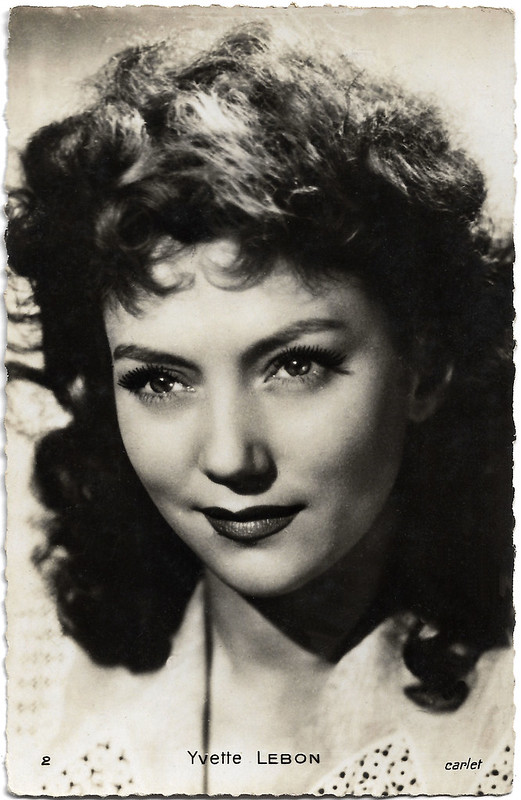
- Lebon in 1930s
- Born: 14 August 1910; Paris, France
- Died: 28 July 2014 (aged 103); Cannes, France
- Resting place: Forest Lawn Memorial Park (Hollywood Hills)
- Occupation: Actress
- Years active: 1931–1971 (film)

Yvette Lebon (14 August 1910 – 28 July 2014) was a French actress.

== Biography ==
Lebon studied music and art before going into acting. During World War II, she was the mistress of Jean Luchaire, a French journalist and press baron executed after the war for collaboration with France's German occupiers. She married American producer Nat Wachsberger and later moved to the United States with him. She lived there until his death in 1992. The couple had one son, Patrick, who became a film producer.

Her first husband was Roger Duchesne, a French actor who was sanctioned after the war for collaborating with the German occupiers. They acted together in the film Gibraltar (1938).

Her relationship with collaborator-press baron Luchaire "attracted the most opprobrium." Indeed, in a 2010 television documentary, according to one account, she admitted "I don't [know] how much theatre and film people knew about what was really going on. We felt privileged. There was always champagne. We didn't have ration books. We lacked for nothing."

She also had a relationship with Sacha Guitry, a prominent French dramatist-actor-director-playwright. He was charged with colluding with the German enemy but separate courts in 1945 and 1947 dropped his case, stirring controversy among the French public.

== Centenarian ==
Lebon turned 103 in August 2013, and was France's oldest surviving actress until her death.

== Partial filmography ==
- Rive gauche (1931)
- He Is Charming (1932)
- Zouzou (1934)
- The Darling of His Concierge (1934)
- Divine (1935)
- Marinella (1936)
- Michel Strogoff (1936)
- The Marriages of Mademoiselle Levy (1936)
- Romarin (1937)
- Abused Confidence (1938), as Alice
- Gibraltar (1938), as Maud Wilco
- Romance of Paris (1941)
- Le Destin fabuleux de Désirée Clary (1942), as Julie Clary
- Pamela (1945)
- Monsieur Grégoire Escapes (1946)
- Milady and the Musketeers (1952), as Milady Anne
- Sophie and the Crime (1955)
- The Mysteries of Paris (1957)
- The Night They Killed Rasputin (1960)
- Agent X-77 Orders to Kill (1966)
- The Viscount (1967)
- All Mad About Him (1967)
- Cannabis (1970), as Emerys Mätresse
