= Son of the Hunchback =

1952 film

- Directed by: Fernando Cerchio
- Written by: Leonardo Benvenuti; Giuseppe Mangione
- Based on: Le Bossu by Paul Féval
- Produced by: Giorgio Venturini
- Starring: Rossano Brazzi; Milly Vitale; Gabrielle Dorziat
- Cinematography: Arturo Gallea
- Edited by: Renzo Lucidi
- Music by: Ezio Carabella
- Production company: Venturini Film
- Release date: 20 November 1952
- Running time: 78 minutes
- Countries: France; Italy
- Language: Italian

Son of the Hunchback (French: Le fils de Lagardère, Italian: Il Figlio di Lagardere) is a 1952 French-Italian historical adventure film directed by Fernando Cerchio and starring Rossano Brazzi, Milly Vitale and Gabrielle Dorziat. The film's sets were designed by the art director Giancarlo Bartolini Salimbeni. It is inspired by the 1858 historical novel Le Bossu by Paul Féval.

== Cast ==
- Rossano Brazzi as Philippe de Lagardère
- Milly Vitale as Olympe de Chaverny
- Gabrielle Dorziat as Contessa Lagardere
- Vittorio Sanipoli as Conte Zeno
- Nerio Bernardi as Cocardasse
- Nico Pepe as Helonin
- Antoine Balpêtré as Pérolle
- Simone Renant as Mathilde Pérolle
- Beppe Tranico
- Raymond Cordy as Passepoil
- Olga Vittoria Gentilli
- Franco Balducci
- Cesare Bettarini
- Arrigo Peri
- Isa Querio

== Bibliography ==
- Parish, Robert. Film Actors Guide. Scarecrow Press, 1977.
