= The Damned Lovers =

1952 film

- German poster
- Directed by: Willy Rozier
- Written by: Willy Rozier
- Produced by: Willy Rozier
- Starring: Robert Berri; Jacques Dynam; Ginette Baudin
- Cinematography: Fred Langenfeld
- Edited by: Mireille Baron
- Music by: Alain Romans; Jean Yatove
- Production company: Sport-Films
- Distributed by: Cocinor
- Release date: 13 March 1952
- Running time: 97 minutes
- Country: France
- Language: French

The Damned Lovers (French: Les amants maudits) is a 1952 French crime film directed by Willy Rozier and starring Robert Berri, Jacques Dynam, and Ginette Baudin. A film noir, it has been described as a "post-Liberation French Bonnie and Clyde story". It attracted audiences of around 1.1 million at the French domestic box office.

== Synopsis ==
A cafe waiter reads crime novels and dreams of being a somebody. In order to impress his girlfriend he steals a car and becomes a real-life gangster.

== Cast ==
- Danièle Roy as Jacky
- Robert Berri as Paul Morelli
- Denise Cardi as Maryse
- Jacques Dynam as Raoul
- René Alié as Giaccomidi
- Ginette Baudin as Tamara
- Georges Tourreil as the Director of Police
- Jean Lara as the Director of Sports Films
- Maurice Bénard as Inspector Mavraux
- Marco Villa as Dédé
- Milly Mathis as La marseillaise
- Yves Furet as Léo

== Bibliography ==
- Walker-Morrison, Deborah. Classic French Noir: Gender and the Cinema of Fatal Desire. Bloomsbury Publishing, 2020.
