= Giovanni Fusco =

Italian composer

Giovanni Fusco (10 October 1906, Sant'Agata dei Goti, Benevento – 31 May 1968, Rome) was an Italian composer, pianist and conductor, who has written numerous film scores since 1936, including those of Alain Resnais's Hiroshima mon amour (1959) and La guerre est finie (1966), as well as those of most of the 1948-1964 films directed by Michelangelo Antonioni, from N.U. (Nettezza Urbana) to Il deserto rosso, except for La notte (soundtrack by Giorgio Gaslini) and some of his early short films. Two of his soundtracks, those of Antonioni's Cronaca di un amore and L'avventura, won Silver Ribbon for the best film score from Italian National Syndicate of Film Journalists in 1951 and 1961, respectively.

His brother Tarcisio Fusco was also a composer. His daughter was the operatic soprano Cecilia Fusco.

== Selected filmography ==
- The Countess of Parma (1936)
- Joe the Red (1936)
- Doctor Antonio (1937)
- The Sin of Rogelia Sanchez (1940)
- Two on a Vacation (1940)
- Two Hearts (1943)
- The Models of Margutta (1946)
- Hand of Death (1949)
- Mistress of the Mountains (1950)
- Cronaca di un amore (1950)
- The Mistress of Treves (1952)
- They Were Three Hundred (1952)
- Orphan of the Ghetto (1954)
- The Angel of the Alps (1957)
- The Mysteries of Paris (1957)
- Slave Women of Corinth (1958)
- L'Avventura (1960)
- The Cossacks (1960)
- The Pharaohs' Woman (1960)
- Cleopatra's Daughter (1960)
- L'Eclisse (1962)
- Invasion 1700 (1962)
- The Sea (1962)
- The Avenger (1962)
- Sandokan the Great (1963)
- Pirates of Malaysia (1964)
- Red Desert (1964)
- The War Is Over (1966)
- Garter Colt (1968)
- Run, Psycho, Run (1968)
- The Sex of Angels (1968)
- A Black Veil for Lisa (1968)
- Love and Anger (1969)
- The Confession (1970)
