= The Man in My Life =

1952 film

- Directed by: Guy Lefranc
- Written by: Michel Audiard; Henri Jeanson
- Produced by: Jacques Bar
- Starring: Madeleine Robinson; Jeanne Moreau
- Cinematography: Carlo Carlini
- Edited by: Christian Gaudin
- Music by: Paul Misraki
- Production companies: Cité Films; FilmEuropa; Paris Film Productions
- Distributed by: FilmEuropa (Italy); Victory Films (France)
- Release date: 16 April 1952
- Running time: 98 minutes
- Countries: France; Italy
- Language: French

The Man in My Life (French: L' Homme de ma vie, French: L'uomo della mia vita) is a 1952 French-Italian drama film directed by Guy Lefranc and starring Madeleine Robinson, Jeanne Moreau and Jane Marken. It was made at the Cinecittà studios in Rome.

== Cast ==
- Madeleine Robinson as Madeleine Dubreuil
- Jeanne Moreau as Suzanne Dubreuil
- Jane Marken as Emma
- Walter Santesso as Michel
- Henri Vilbert as Léon Fontaine
- Gianni Musy as Alberto Grino
- Émile Genevois as Monsieur Grino
- Olga Solbelli
- Umberto Spadaro
