= N.U. (film) =

1948 Italian film

- Directed by: Michelangelo Antonioni
- Produced by: Vieri Bigazzi (production manager)
- Cinematography: Giovanni Ventimiglia
- Music by: Giovanni Fusco
- Production companies: I.C.E.T., Milan
- Distributed by: Lux Film
- Release date: 1948
- Running time: 11 minutes
- Country: Italy
- Language: Italian

N.U. (short for Nettezza urbana, Italian urban cleansing service) is a 1948 Italian documentary short film directed by Michelangelo Antonioni. The film examines a weekday from morning until evening of Italian road sweepers, captured at work on the streets of post-World War II Rome.

== Style ==
In a 1961 discussion with film students, Antonioni explained that he wanted to achieve a contrast to the then dominating neorealist documentary style with his film by use of a "poetically free montage".

== Awards ==
- 1948 Nastro d'Argento for Best Documentary

== Legacy ==
N.U. has been screened as part of retrospectives on Antonioni at various festivals and institutions, including the Museum of Modern Art, the Berkeley Art Museum and Pacific Film Archive, and the Cinémathèque Française. It has been released on home media as part of The Criterion Collection's release of Antonioni's Red Desert.
