= Marcel Blistène =

French film director (1911–1991)

- Born: 3 June 1911; Paris, France
- Died: 2 August 1991 (aged 80)
- Years active: 1945–1959

Marcel Blistène, born Marcel Blitstein (3 June 1911 – 2 August 1991), was a French film director.

Blistène was born in Paris. In 1930, he joined Paramount as an assistant after studying literature. He then began a career as a film journalist, for Pour Vous and Cinémonde.

He made his first movie, Star Without Light, in 1945, and in the thirteen years that followed, he directed ten more motion pictures.

== Filmography ==
- Star Without Light (1946) (also writer)
- Back Streets of Paris (1946)
- Night Express (1948)
- The Sky Sorcerer (1949)
- Bibi Fricotin (1951)
- This Age Without Pity (1952)
- Fire Under Her Skin (1954) (also writer)
- Pleasures and Vices (1955) (also writer)
- Sylviane of My Nights (1957) (also writer and producer)
- The Lovers of Tomorrow (1959)
