= Pleins feux sur Stanislas =

- Directed by: Jean-Charles Dudrumet
- Written by: Michel Cousin; Jean-Charles Dudrumet
- Produced by: Caro, CICC
- Starring: Jean Marais
- Cinematography: Pierre Gueguen
- Edited by: Armand Psenny; Jeannine Verneau
- Music by: Georges Delerue
- Release date: 23 September 1965 (France)
- Running time: 93 minutes
- Countries: France; West Germany
- Language: French
- Box office: 1,125,104 admissions (France)

Pleins feux sur Stanislas (English: Full fires on Stanislas) is a French-German comedy thriller film from 1965. It was directed by Jean-Charles Dudrumet, written by Michel Cousin and Jean-Charles Dudrumet, starring Jean Marais. The film was known under the title Killer Spy (USA), O Mistério dos 13 (Portugal), Rendezvous der Killer (West Germany).

It was a sequel of L'honorable Stanislas, agent secret from 1963.

== Cast ==
- Jean Marais: Stanislas Dubois, the secret agent, writer
- Nadja Tiller: Bénédicte Rameau, literature critic
- André Luguet: the colonel of Sailly, the leader
- Bernadette Lafont: Rosine Lenoble, the fiancée of Vladimir
- Rudolf Forster: Rameau, the father of Bénédicte (under the name of "Rudolph Forster")
- Nicole Maurey: Claire, the chairwoman of the association
- Yvonne Clech: the hotel keeper
- Marcelle Arnold: Morin, secretary of Stanislas
- Jacques Morel: the tax inspector of Stanislas
- Bernard Lajarrige: Paul, the butler of Stanislas
- Edward Meeks: James, the English spy
- Billy Kearns: American spy
- Clément Harari: Soviet spy
- Henri Tisot: Agent 07 at the telephone
- Pierre Tchernia: the TV presenter
- Max Montavon: the barman of the dining car
- Edmond Tamiz: Nikita / Vladimir, the murdered brothers
- Charles Régnier: the man with the cat (uncredited)
