= Andrée Debar =

French actress and producer

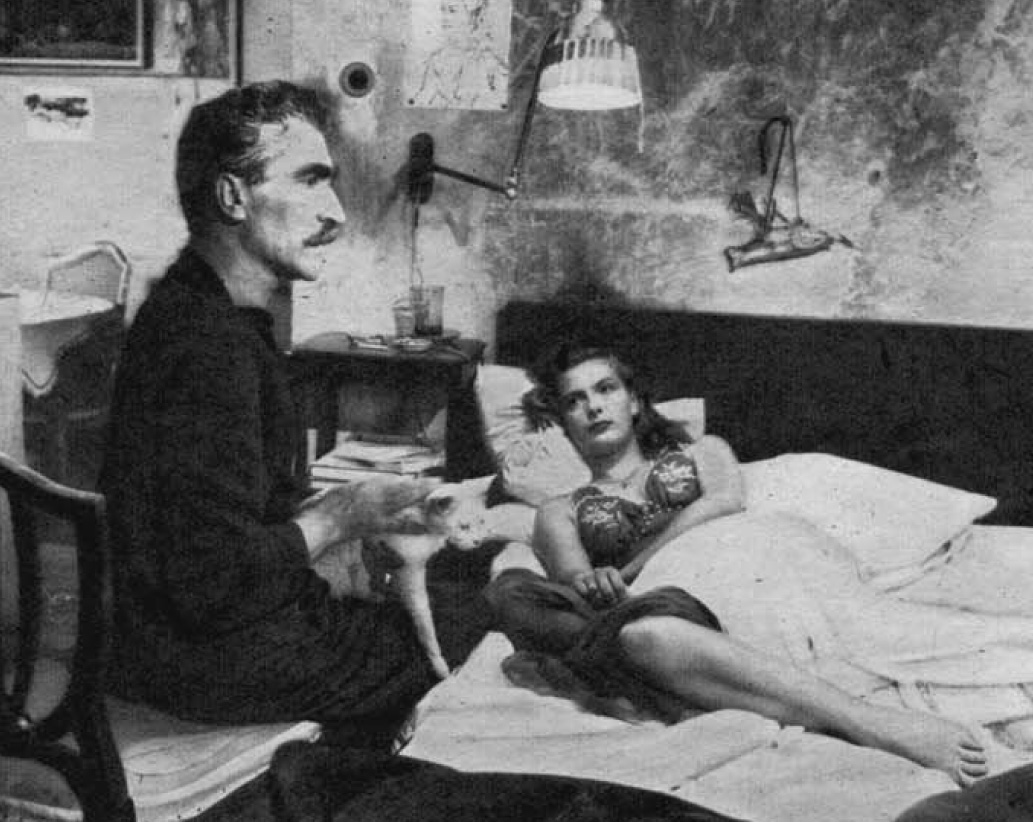
- With Orfeo Tamburi in The Seven Deadly Sins (1952)
- Born: 5 May 1920; Maisons-Laffitte, Seine-et-Oise, France
- Died: 24 January 1999 (aged 78)
- Occupations: Actress, Producer

Andrée Debar (5 May 1920 – 24 January 1999) was a French actress and producer of stage and screen. She was married to the right-wing French politician and film producer Roger Duchet.

== Selected filmography ==
- The Hell of Lost Pilots (1949)
- Judgement of God (1952)
- The Seven Deadly Sins (1952)
- The Merchant of Venice (1953)
- The King's Prisoner (1954)
- House on the Waterfront (1955)
- Guilty (1956)
- The Flapper (1957)
- Girl and the River (1958)
- Le secret du Chevalier d'Éon (1959)
- Croesus (1960)
- A King Without Distraction (1963)

== Bibliography ==
- Hayward, Susan. French Costume Drama of the 1950s: Fashioning Politics in Film. Intellect Books, 2010.
