= Ginette Baudin =

French actress

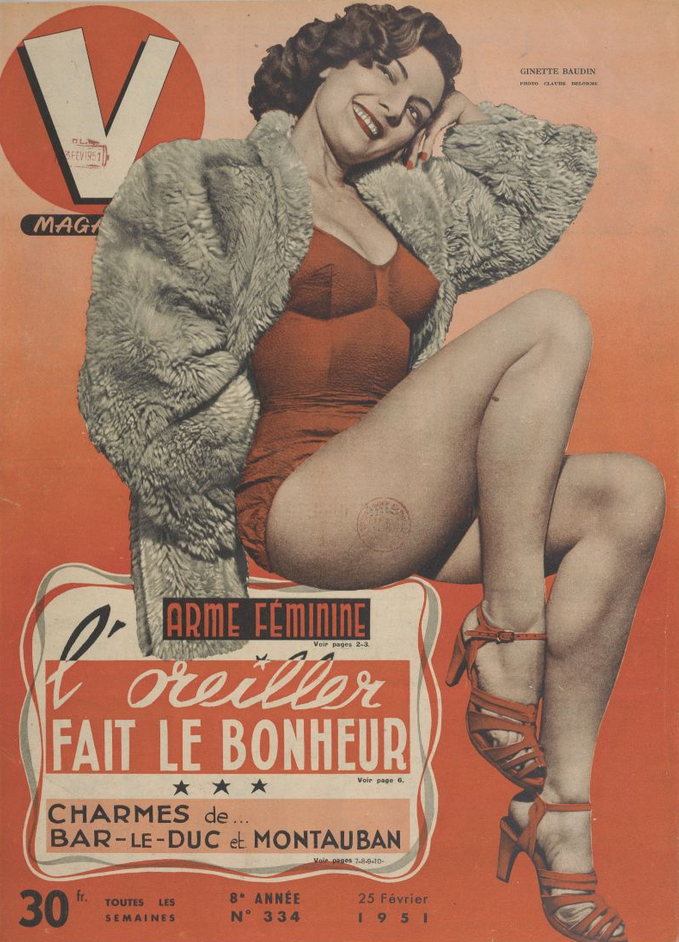
- Baudin in 1951.
- Born: 4 March 1921; Montceau-les-Mines, Saône-et-Loire, France
- Died: 26 March 1971 (aged 50); Paris, France
- Occupation: Actress
- Years active: 1941 - 1967 (film & TV)

Ginette Baudin (1921–1971) was a French stage and film actress. She was married to the actor Andrex.

== Selected filmography ==
- The Chain Breaker (1941)
- Macao (1942)
- The Stairs Without End (1943)
- Home Port (1943)
- Son of France (1946)
- The Beautiful Trip (1947)
- The Unexpected Voyager (1950)
- The Prettiest Sin in the World (1951)
- The Damned Lovers (1952)
- Baratin (1956)

== Bibliography ==
- Goble, Alan. The Complete Index to Literary Sources in Film. Walter de Gruyter, 1999.
