= Nuss =

Nuss (German: nut) may refer to:

- Nuss procedure, a minimally invasive procedure, invented by Dr. Donald Nuss for treating pectus excavatum
- Bobby Nuss Stadium, Chalmette High School's football stadium in Chalmette, in unincorporated St. Bernard Parish, Louisiana
- National Union of School Students (NUSS) in England
- National University of Singapore Society
- Thiago Nuss (born 2001), Argentine footballer
- William J. Nuss (1914-1991), American politician and lawyer
- NBCUniversal Syndication Studios, the television syndication division of NBCUniversal.

== See also ==
- Nusse, a village in the district of Lauenburg, in Schleswig-Holstein, Germany
