= Jean-Marc Tennberg =

French actor

- Born: 12 May 1924; Pantin, Seine-Saint-Denis, France
- Died: 12 August 1971 (aged 47); Lourmarin, Vaucluse, France
- Occupation: Actor
- Years active: 1945-1969 (film & TV)

Jean-Marc Tennberg (1924–1971) was a French film, stage and television actor. He played a number of supporting roles in post-war French cinema. He was also a poet known for his television recitals.

== Selected filmography ==
- Cyrano de Bergerac (1946)
- The Ideal Couple (1946)
- Monsieur Vincent (1947)
- The Unknown Singer (1947)
- The Gamblers (1950)
- The Cape of Hope (1951)
- Rue des Saussaies (1951)
- Fanfan la Tulipe (1952)
- Adorable Creatures (1952)
- Are We All Murderers? (1952)
- The Moment of Truth (1952)
- The Road to Damascus (1952)
- The Lottery of Happiness (1953)
- The Three Musketeers (1953)
- Faites-moi confiance (1954)
- Madame du Barry (1954)
- The Beautiful Otero (1954)
- La Bande à papa (1956)
- Women's Club (1956)
- Law of the Streets (1956)
- Une ravissante idiote (1964)
- Hot Frustrations (1965)

== Bibliography ==
- Andrew, Dudley (ed.) Andre Bazin's New Media. University of California Press, 2014.
