= The Mistress of Treves =

1952 film directed by Arthur Maria Rabenalt

- Directed by: Arthur Maria Rabenalt
- Written by: Corrado Pavolini; Carlo Terron; Jacopo da Varazze (book); Lino de Joanna; Giuseppe del Ongaro
- Produced by: Giorgio Venturini
- Starring: Rossano Brazzi; Anne Vernon; Gianni Santuccio
- Cinematography: Massimo Dallamano
- Edited by: Loris Bellero
- Music by: Giovanni Fusco
- Production company: Venturini Film
- Distributed by: Accord-Film; Regionale; Synimex
- Release date: 6 February 1952
- Running time: 84 minutes
- Countries: France; Italy; West Germany
- Language: Italian

The Mistress of Treves (Italian: La Leggenda di Genoveffa) is a 1952 historical drama film directed by Arthur Maria Rabenalt and starring Rossano Brazzi, Anne Vernon and Gianni Santuccio. Made as a co-production between France, Italy and West Germany, it was filmed at the Icet Studios in Milan and on location in the Aosta Valley. It is based on the legend of Genevieve of Brabant and is set during the time of the Crusades.

== Cast ==
- Rossano Brazzi as Sigfrido, conte di Treviri
- Anne Vernon as Genoveffa di Brabante
- Gianni Santuccio as Golo
- Enzo Fiermonte as Il barone Drago
- Edmea Lari as La locandiera
- Elena Borgo as Berta
- Pietro Tordi as Orso
- Nerio Bernardi
- Arrigo Peri
- Domenico Viglione Borghese
- Piera Vidale
- Piero Carnabuci
- Emilio Baldanello
- Raf Pindi
- Franco Fabrizi
- Jolanda Blasi
- Anna Carena
- Carlo Dale

== Bibliography ==
- Bock, Hans-Michael; Bergfelder, Tim, eds. (2009). The Concise Cinegraph: Encyclopaedia of German Cinema. New York: Berghahn Books. ISBN 978-1-57181-655-9.
- Harty, Kevin J. (1999). The Reel Middle Ages: American, Western and Eastern European, Middle Eastern and Asian Films About Medieval Europe. Jefferson, NC: McFarland. ISBN 978-0-7864-0541-1.
