= Judgement of God =

Le Jugement de Dieu
- Movie poster
- Directed by: Raymond Bernard
- Written by: Bernard Zimmer; Pierre Montazel
- Produced by: B.U.P.
- Starring: Andrée Debar; Jean-Claude Pascal; Pierre Renoir
- Cinematography: Roger Hubert
- Music by: Joseph Kosma
- Release date: 20 August 1952 (France)
- Running time: 98 minutes
- Country: France
- Language: French

Judgement of God (French: Le Jugement de Dieu) is a French drama film from 1952, directed by Raymond Bernard, written by Pierre Montazel, and starring by Andrée Debar and Louis de Funès. The screenplay was based on the German legend from the 15th century. The German title is Agnes Bernauer.

== Cast ==
- Andrée Debar : Agnes Bernauer
- Jean-Claude Pascal : Albert III, Duke of Bavaria
- Pierre Renoir : Ernest, Duke of Bavaria
- Gabrielle Dorziat : Josepha, Prince Albert's aunt
- Jean Barrère : Count Törring
- Olivier Hussenot : Mr Bernauer, the father of Agnès and Marie (the barber)
- Louis Seigner : the burgomaster (mayor)
- André Wasley : the captain
- Jacques Dynam : a soldier
- Max Dalban : a butcher
- Jean Clarieux : the leader of the outlaws
- Marcel Raine : the minister
- Louis de Funès : the burgomaster's emissary
- Georges Douking : Enrique (the monk)
