= Piero Gherardi =

Italian costume and production designer (1909–1971)

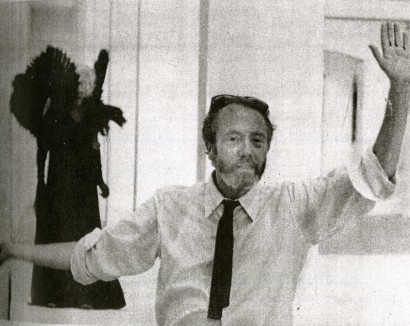
- Born: 20 November 1909; Poppi, Kingdom of Italy
- Died: 8 June 1971 (aged 61); Rome, Italy
- Occupations: Costume designer; production designer; art director
- Years active: 1947–1971

Piero Gherardi (20 November 1909 – 8 June 1971) was an Italian costume designer, production designer and art director. He is best known to international audiences for his collaborations with directors Mario Monicelli and Federico Fellini. Gherardi has been nominated three times for both the Academy Award for Best Costume Design and the Academy Award for Best Production Design for his work on Fellini's films, and he won twice for creating the costumes for La dolce vita (1960) and 8½ (1963).

Born in Poppi, Tuscany, Gherardi studied to become an architect but went into the budding Italian film industry instead after World War II. He began his artistic collaboration with Fellini during the production of I Vitelloni (1953); it all started when the director recognized Gherardi's talent for scouting locations and extras as well as his deep knowledge of the Lazio region. Gherardi then proved his designing skills with providing the sets and costumes for Fellini's Nights of Cabiria (1957).

Gherardi died in Rome on 8 June 1971, at the age of 61.

== Selected filmography ==
List of Piero Gherardi film credits
| Year | Title | Director | Credited as | | Notes |
| Year | Title | Director | Costume Designer | Production Designer | Notes |
|---|---|---|---|---|---|
| 1947 | Daniele Cortis | Mario Soldati | No | Yes | |
| 1948 | Prelude to Madness | Gianni Franciolini | Yes | Yes | |
| 1948 | Without Pity | Alberto Lattuada | Yes | No | Also set decorator |
| 1948 | Escape to France | Mario Soldati | Yes | No | Also set decorator |
| 1948 | Hey Boy | Luigi Comencini | Yes | No | Also art director |
| 1949 | Alarm Bells | Luigi Zampa | Yes | Yes | |
| 1950 | My Beautiful Daughter | Duilio Coletti | Yes | No | |
| 1950 | Her Favourite Husband | Mario Soldati | Yes | No | Also art director |
| 1950 | Side Street Story | Eduardo De Filippo | Yes | Yes | Co-designed sets with Piero Filippone |
| 1950 | Romanzo d'amore | Duilio Coletti | No | Yes | |
| 1952 | Barefoot Savage | Clemente Fracassi | Yes | Yes | |
| 1952 | Red Shirts | Goffredo Alessandrini; Francesco Rosi | Yes | Yes | Co-designed sets with Camillo Del Signore and Alfredo Montori |
| 1953 | The Unfaithfuls | Mario Monicelli; Steno | Yes | No | Also set decorator |
| 1953 | The Wayward Wife | Mario Soldati | Yes | No | |
| 1955 | Proibito | Mario Monicelli | No | Yes | |
| 1957 | Fathers and Sons | Mario Monicelli | Yes | Yes | |
| 1957 | Nights of Cabiria | Federico Fellini | Yes | Yes | |
| 1957 | Doctor and the Healer | Mario Monicelli | Yes | Yes | |
| 1958 | Big Deal on Madonna Street | Mario Monicelli | Yes | Yes | |
| 1959 | The Great War | Mario Monicelli | Yes | No | with Danilo Donati; Gherardi only designed costumes for Silvana Mangano |
| 1960 | La dolce vita | Federico Fellini | Yes | Yes | |
| 1960 | Under Ten Flags | Duilio Coletti | Yes | No | |
| 1960 | Le pillole di Ercole | Luciano Salce | Yes | No | with Lucia Mirisola |
| 1960 | The Passionate Thief | Mario Monicelli | Yes | Yes | |
| 1960 | The Hunchback of Rome | Carlo Lizzani | Yes | No | |
| 1960 | Crimen | Mario Camerini | Yes | Yes | |
| 1961 | Black City | Duilio Coletti | Yes | Yes | |
| 1962 | Boccaccio '70 | Mario Monicelli | No | Yes | Segment: "Renzo e Luciana" |
| 1963 | 8½ | Federico Fellini | Yes | Yes | |
| 1963 | La ragazza di Bube | Luigi Comencini | Yes | No | |
| 1964 | High Infidelity | Mario Monicelli; Elio Petri; Franco Rossi; Luciano Salce | Yes | Yes | Co-designed costumes with Lucia Mirisola; Designed sets for the segment: "Peccato nel Pomeriggio" |
| 1964 | Three Nights of Love | Renato Castellani; Luigi Comencini; Franco Rossi | Yes | No | |
| 1965 | Le bambole | Luigi Comencini | Yes | No | Segment: "Il trattato di eugenetica" |
| 1965 | Juliet of the Spirits | Federico Fellini | Yes | No | Also art director |
| 1966 | For Love and Gold | Mario Monicelli | Yes | Yes | |
| 1966 | Kiss the Girls and Make Them Die | Jack Pulman; Dino Maiuri | Yes | No | with Maria De Matteis; Gherardi only designed costumes for Dorothy Provine |
| 1966 | Sex Quartet | Mario Monicelli | No | Yes | Segment: "Fata Armenia" |
| 1968 | Black on White | Jörn Donner | Yes | No | |
| 1968 | Bandits in Rome | Alberto De Martino | Yes | No | with Elio Micheli |
| 1969 | Nerosubianco | Tinto Brass | Yes | No | with Giuliana Serano |
| 1969 | The Appointment | Sidney Lumet | Yes | No | Also art director |
| 1969 | Giacomo Casanova: Childhood and Adolescence | Luigi Comencini | Yes | Yes | |

== Awards and nominations ==
| Award | Year (Note: Indicates the year of ceremony. Each year is linked to the article about the awards held that year, wherever possible.) | Category | Work | Result | Ref. |
|---|---|---|---|---|---|
| Academy Awards | 1962 | Best Art Direction – Black-and-White | La dolce vita | Nominated | |
| Academy Awards | 1962 | Best Costume Design – Black-and-White | La dolce vita | Won | |
| Academy Awards | 1964 | Best Art Direction – Black-and-White | 8½ | Nominated | |
| Academy Awards | 1964 | Best Costume Design – Black-and-White | 8½ | Won | |
| Academy Awards | 1967 | Best Art Direction – Color | Juliet of the Spirits | Nominated | |
| Academy Awards | 1967 | Best Costume Design – Color | Juliet of the Spirits | Nominated | |
| Nastro d'Argento Awards | 1961 | Best Production Design | La dolce vita | Won | |
| Nastro d'Argento Awards | 1964 | Best Costume Design | 8½ | Nominated | |
| Nastro d'Argento Awards | 1964 | Best Production Design | 8½ | Nominated | |
| Nastro d'Argento Awards | 1966 | Best Costume Design | Juliet of the Spirits | Won | |
| Nastro d'Argento Awards | 1966 | Best Production Design | Juliet of the Spirits | Won | |
| Nastro d'Argento Awards | 1967 | Best Costume Design | For Love and Gold | Won | |
| Nastro d'Argento Awards | 1967 | Best Production Design | For Love and Gold | Nominated | |
| Nastro d'Argento Awards | 1970 | Best Costume Design | Giacomo Casanova: Childhood and Adolescence | Nominated | |
| Nastro d'Argento Awards | 1970 | Best Production Design | Giacomo Casanova: Childhood and Adolescence | Nominated | |
