= Maria De Matteis =

Italian costume designer (1898–1988)

- Born: 6 March 1898; Florence, Kingdom of Italy
- Died: 9 December 1988 (aged 90); Rome, Italy
- Occupation: Costume designer
- Years active: 1937–1985

Maria De Matteis (6 March 1898 – 9 December 1988) was an Italian costume designer. Her accolades include a BAFTA Award, in addition to nominations for an Academy Award and an Emmy Award.

== Selected filmography ==
=== Film ===
Year	Title	Director	Notes
1939	The Marquis of Ruvolito	Raffaello Matarazzo	
1939	The Boarders at Saint-Cyr	Gennaro Righelli	
1940	The Birth of Salome	Jean Choux	
1940	Don Pasquale	Camillo Mastrocinque	
1941	Piccolo mondo antico	Mario Soldati	
1941	Pirates of Malaya	Enrico Guazzoni	
1942	Yes, Madam	Ferdinando Maria Poggioli	
1942	A Pistol Shot	Renato Castellani	
1942	Don Cesare di Bazan	Riccardo Freda	
1942	Malombra	Mario Soldati	
1943	Ossessione	Luchino Visconti	
1946	The Ways of Sin	Giorgio Pastina	
1946	Professor, My Son	Renato Castellani	
1947	Vanity	Giorgio Pastina	
1947	The Captain's Daughter	Mario Camerini	
1947	The Two Orphans	Mario Mattoli	
1948	Cab Number 13	Mario Mattoli; Raoul André	
1949	William Tell	Giorgio Pastina; Michał Waszyński	
1949	The Flame That Will Not Die	Vittorio Cottafavi	
1949	The Mill on the Po	Alberto Lattuada	
1949	The Iron Swordsman	Riccardo Freda	
1949	Sicilian Uprising	Giorgio Pastina	
1950	Guarany	Riccardo Freda	
1950	Pact with the Devil	Luigi Chiarini	
1950	Figaro Here, Figaro There	Carlo Ludovico Bragaglia	
1950	Romanzo d'amore	Duilio Coletti	
1951	I'm the Capataz	Giorgio Simonelli	
1951	La grande rinuncia	Aldo Vergano	
1951	The Young Caruso	Giacomo Gentilomo	
1951	I due derelitti	Flavio Calzavara	
1951	Othello	Orson Welles	
1951	Lorenzaccio	Raffaello Pacini	
1952	The City Stands Trial	Luigi Zampa	
1952	The Secret of Three Points	Carlo Ludovico Bragaglia	
1952	At Sword's Edge	Carlo Ludovico Bragaglia	
1952	The Flame	Alessandro Blasetti	
1952	The Golden Coach	Jean Renoir	
1952	Red Love	Aldo Vergano	
1953	The Blind Woman of Sorrento	Giacomo Gentilomo	
1953	Aida	Clemente Fracassi	
1953	Cavallina storna	Giulio Morelli	
1954	Neapolitan Carousel	Ettore Giannini	
1954	House of Ricordi	Carmine Gallone	
1954	Too Bad She's Bad	Alessandro Blasetti	
1954	The Art of Getting Along	Luigi Zampa	
1954	Casta Diva	Carmine Gallone	
1955	Sins of Casanova	Steno	
1955	Golden Vein	Mauro Bolognini	
1956	War and Peace	King Vidor	
1956	Tosca	Carmine Gallone	
1957	This Angry Age	René Clément	
1958	Fortunella	Eduardo De Filippo	
1958	Tempest	Alberto Lattuada	
1959	The Son of the Red Corsair	Primo Zeglio	
1960	Gastone	Mario Bonnard	
1960	Five Branded Women	Martin Ritt	
1960	Son of Samson	Carlo Campogalliani	
1961	Ghosts of Rome	Antonio Pietrangeli	
1961	The Story of Joseph and His Brethren	Irving Rapper	
1961	Barabbas	Richard Fleischer	
1962	The Reluctant Saint	Edward Dmytryk	
1962	The Captive City	Joseph Anthony	
1966	Kiss the Girls and Make Them Die	Henry Levin	
1966	The Bible: In the Beginning...	John Huston	
1967	The Girl and the General	Pasquale Festa Campanile	with Piero Gherardi
1969	Fräulein Doktor	Alberto Lattuada	
1969	Bootleggers	Alfio Caltabiano	
1970	Waterloo	Sergei Bondarchuk	with Ugo Pericoli; De Matteis designed civilian costumes, whereas Pericoli designed military uniform

=== Television ===
Year	Title	Notes
1985	Christopher Columbus	4 episodes

== Awards and nominations ==
Award	Year (Note: Indicates the year of ceremony. Each year is linked to the article about the awards held that year, wherever possible.)	Category	Work	Result	Ref.
Academy Awards	1957	Best Costume Design – Color	War and Peace	Nominated	
British Academy Film Awards	1971	Best Costume Design	Waterloo	Won	
Nastro d'Argento Awards	1953	Best Costume Design	The Golden Coach	Won	
Nastro d'Argento Awards	1961	Best Costume Design	Gastone	Won	
Nastro d'Argento Awards	1962	Best Costume Design	Barabbas	Nominated	
Nastro d'Argento Awards	1967	Best Costume Design	The Bible: In the Beginning...	Nominated	
Primetime Emmy Awards	1985	Outstanding Costume Design for a Limited Series or a Special	Christopher Columbus	Nominated	
