= Andrea Chénier (film) =

- Directed by: Clemente Fracassi
- Written by: Luigi Illica (libretto); Clemente Fracassi; Anna Gobbi; Jacques Rémy
- Starring: Antonella Lualdi; Raf Vallone; Michel Auclair
- Cinematography: Piero Portalupi
- Edited by: Mario Bonotti
- Music by: Giulio Cesare Sonzogno
- Production companies: Cigno Film; Lux Compagnie Cinématographique de France
- Distributed by: Lux Compagnie Cinématographique de France; Lux Film
- Release date: 28 December 1955
- Running time: 110 minutes
- Countries: France; Italy
- Language: Italian

Andrea Chénier, also spelled Andrea Chenier, is a 1955 French-Italian historical musical melodrama film directed by Clemente Fracassi and starring Antonella Lualdi, Raf Vallone and Michel Auclair. It is loosely based on the eponymous 1896 opera by Umberto Giordano about the eighteenth century poet André Chénier. The film's sets were designed by the art directors Flavio Mogherini and Franco Zeffirelli. It was shot using Technicolor and VistaVision.

== Cast ==
- Antonella Lualdi as Madeleine de Coigny
- Raf Vallone as Gérard
- Michel Auclair as Andrea Chénier
- Rina Morelli as mother of Andrea
- Sergio Tofano as Luigi Chénier
- Denis d'Inès as Countess of Coigny
- Mario Mariani as Maria Giuseppe Chenier
- Denis d'Inès as Countess of Coigny
- Piero Carnabuci as Count of Coigny
- Maria Zanoli as housekeeper
- Piero Carnabuci as count of Coigny
- Franca Mazzoni as Countess of Coigny
- Alfredo Bianchini as Incroyable
- Michael Tor as English ambassador to Paris
- Antonio Pierfederici as Robespierre
- Franco Castellani as Danton
- Marco Guglielmi as public prosecutor
- Angelo Galassi as president of the court
- Valeria Montesi as Idia Le Gray
- Marianna Liebl as hunting lady
- Claude Beauclair as Louis
- Charles Fernley Fawcett as French ambassador to London
- Catherine Valnay as Bersy
- Nando Cicero
