= Gerolamo Rovetta =

Italian writer

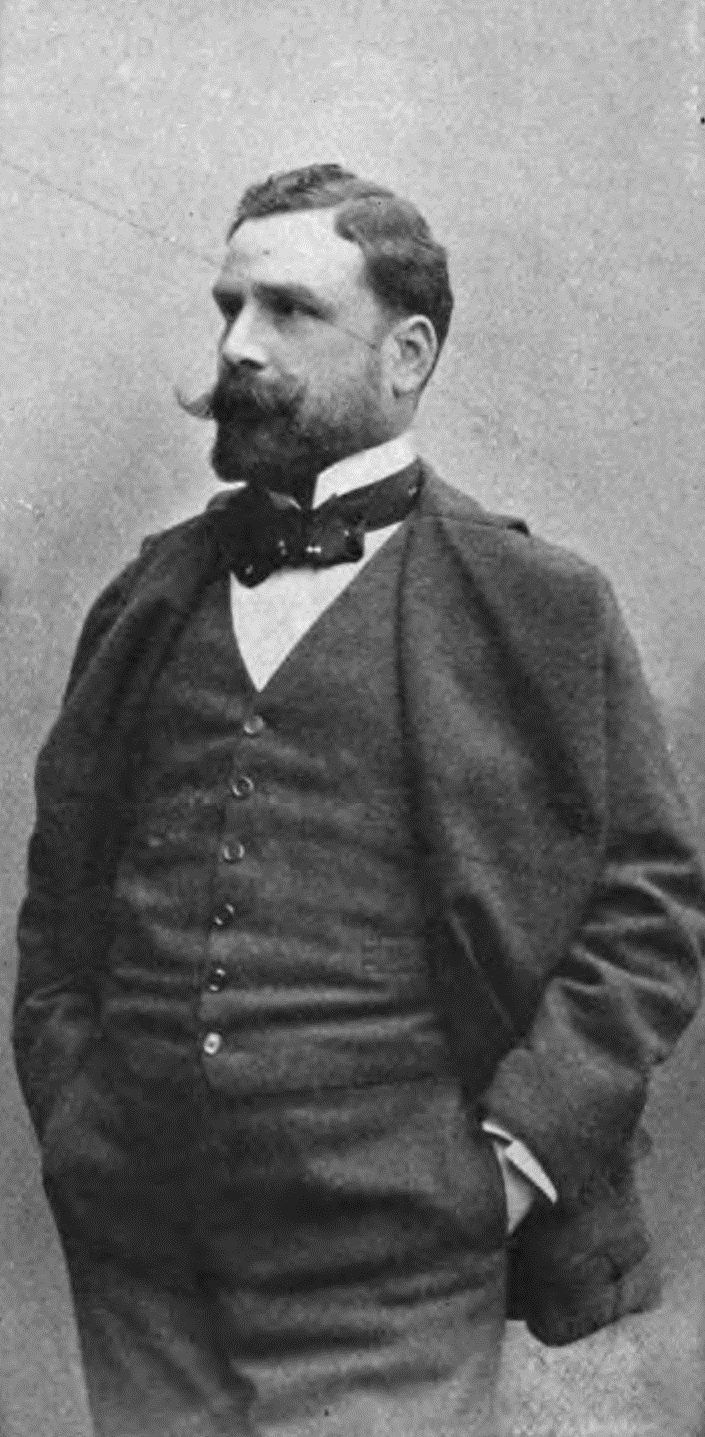
Gerolamo Rovetta

Gerolamo Rovetta (November 30, 1851 – May 8, 1910) was an Italian writer and playwright.

Rovetta was born in Brescia, Austrian Empire. Rovetta was the writer of many novels and short stories as well of stage plays, mostly dramas. His first novel was Mater dolorosa (1882), a novel set in the world of the nobles that achieved a considerably popular success. The late nineteenth century English novelist George Gissing read Rovetta's La Baraonda in Italian in November 1894, the year of its publication. After initially saying that he liked it, he concluded eventually that it was "not an original book" as it recalled "too strongly French and Russian novels".

He is also well known for the drama Romanticismo, whose success was partly due to its patriotic content; it was later adapted in a film with the same name directed by Clemente Fracassi and starred by Amedeo Nazzari and Clara Calamai. In theatre Romanticismo and I disonesti found in Paola Pezzaglia an ideal interpreter.

Close to verismo, his works represent the Lombard political and the bourgeoisie of the time, and show the disillusionment for the failure of the ideals of the Risorgimento.

In 1910 Rovetta committed suicide, leaving an unfinished novel.
