= Folco Lulli =

Italian actor

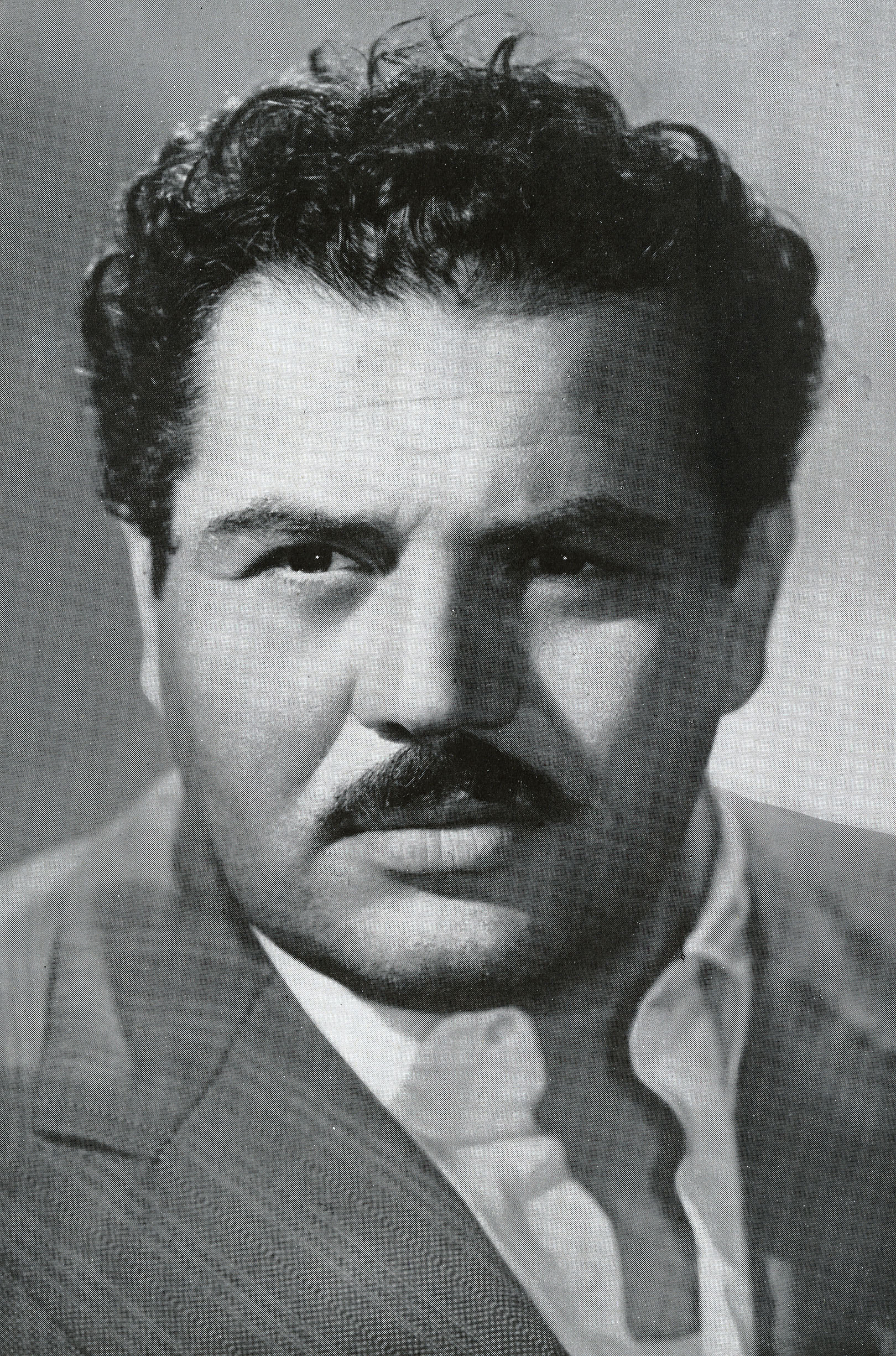
- Folco Lulli in 1954
- Born: 3 July 1912; Florence, Italy
- Died: 23 May 1970 (aged 57); Rome, Italy
- Occupation: Actor
- Years active: 1946–1970

Folco Lulli (3 July 1912 – 23 May 1970) was an Italian partisan and film actor. He appeared in more than 100 films between 1946 and 1970.

== Life and career ==
Born in Florence, the son of the baritone Gino Lulli and the elder brother of actor Piero, in 1936 Lulli took part in the Second Italo-Ethiopian War as the commander of a group of Ethiopian troops. In 1943, he entered the Italian resistance movement and became a partisan; Captured by the Nazis, he was deported to Germany but managed to escape and move to the Soviet Union.

After the war, Lulli worked as a pharmaceutical sales representative before being noted by Alberto Lattuada, who gave him a major role in The Bandit. The critical and commercial success of the film secured Lulli a long career as a character actor, equally split between villain and working-class roles. In 1964, he was awarded the Nastro d'Argento for best supporting actor for his performance in Mario Monicelli's The Organizer. He made his directorial debut in 1967 with Gente d'onore. He was also active on stage and television.

Lulli died on 23 May 1970 from embolism while hospitalized to treat thrombophlebitis.

== Selected filmography ==
- The Bandit (1946) - Andrea
- The White Primrose (1947)
- Flesh Will Surrender (1947) - Carlini
- Tragic Hunt (1947) - Un fattore
- The Captain's Daughter (1947) - Zulai (uncredited)
- Bullet for Stefano (1947) - Il monco
- How I Lost the War (1947) - Ufficiale americano sul ponte
- The White Devil (1947)
- Crossroads of Passion (1948) - Viù
- Without Pity (1948) - Giacomo
- Escape to France (1948) - Riccardo Torre
- L'eroe della strada (1948) - Operaio turbulento
- Vertigine d'amore (1949) - Luca / France: Romain Toucas
- A Night of Fame (1949) - Ramirez
- Toto Looks for a House (1949) - Turco
- How I Discovered America (1949) - Il signorotto
- Hawk of the Nile (1950) - Ibrahim
- No Peace Under the Olive Tree (1950) - Agostino Bonfiglio
- Variety Lights (1950) - Adelmo Conti
- Brief Rapture (1951) - Meccanico caposquadra della stazione
- Love and Blood (1951) - Pietro
- Shadows Over Naples (1951) - Pietro
- Tragic Serenade (1951) - Don Vincenzo Matturini
- Nobody's Children (1951) - Anselmo Vannini
- Lorenzaccio (1951) - Scoronconcalo
- In Olden Days (1952) - Secondo contadino toscano (segment "Questione d'interesse")
- Falsehood (1952) - Rocco
- La colpa di una madre (1952) - Enrico
- Prisoners of Darkness (1952) - Amedeo Pisani
- Infame accusa (1953) - Giovannino
- The Wages of Fear (1953) - Luigi
- Jeunes mariés (1953) - L'aubergiste
- Riscatto (1953) - Il Maremmano
- Noi cannibali (1953) - Tongo
- Island Sinner (1954) - Don Pietro Ingarsia
- Non vogliamo morire (1954) - Carter
- Maddalena (1954) - Domenico, il bovaro
- Neapolitan Carousel (1954) - Don Raffaele
- Submarine Attack (1954) - Nostromo, First Mate
- The Air of Paris (1954) - Angelo Posi
- Acque amare (1954) - Nightclub Owner (uncredited)
- Orient Express (1954) - Filippo dal Pozzo
- The Count of Monte Cristo (1954, part 1, 2) - Jacopo
- Fortune carrée (1955) - Hussein
- The Star of Rio (1955) - Mario
- Rice Girl (1956) - Pietro Guerrini
- We're All Necessary (1956) - Iniesta, un ladrón
- L'Homme et l'Enfant (1956) - Carlo Ferrelli
- The House of Intrigue (1956) - King Kong Kaarden
- Io, Caterina (1957) - Nobile Tolomei
- An Eye for an Eye (1957) - Bortak
- The Italians They Are Crazy (1958) - Don Bernardo
- El hereje (1958)
- The Sky Burns (1958) - Tazzoli
- Pezzo, capopezzo e capitano (1958) - Sciacciabratta
- Polikuschka (1958) - Polikuschka
- Sheba and the Gladiator (1959) - Zemanzius - Zenobia's Prime Minister
- Délit de fuite (1959) - Franco
- Wolves of the Deep (1959) - Nostromo
- The Great War (1959) - Bordin
- Marie of the Isles (1959) - Le capitaine Le Fort
- La nuit des traqués (1959) - Lino
- The Regattas of San Francisco (1960) - Luigi, le père de Lidia
- Under Ten Flags (1960) - Paco
- Colossus and the Amazon Queen (1960) - Pachiderma
- The Huns (1960) - Igor
- Esther and the King (1960) - Tobiah
- Vacanze in Argentina (1960) - Giovannino Fioravanti
- Spade senza bandiera (1961) - Diego Benvenuti di Pianora
- The Tartars (1961) - Togrul
- Rome 1585 (1961) - Fra Silenzio
- Oh Islam (1961) - Prince Aktai
- Romulus and the Sabines (1961) - King Titus Tazio
- Erik the Conqueror (1961) - Viking King Harald
- La Fayette (1962) - Le Boursier
- Venus Against the Son of Hercules (1962)
- Warriors Five (1962) - Marzi
- Dulcinea (1962) - Sancho Panza
- Un alibi per morire (1962)
- The Shortest Day (1963) - Ufficiale a teatro (uncredited)
- Duel at the Rio Grande (1963) - José
- The Organizer (1963) - Pautasso
- Revenge of the Musketeers (1963) - Cardinal Mazarini
- Les Parias de la gloire (1964) - Blosky
- Last Plane to Baalbek (1964) - John Volpi
- Oltraggio al pudore (1964) - Gabriele's Father
- Black Humor (1965) - Count Ripoli (segment 3 'La cornacchia')
- Marco the Magnificent (1965) - Spinello, Venetian Merchant
- For Love and Gold (1966) - Pecoro
- Lightning Bolt (1966) - Mr. Rehte
- The Murderer with the Silk Scarf (1966) - Polizeirat Erwin Moll
- Le Grand Restaurant (1966) - Le président Novalès
- Blockhead (1966) - Testa Di Rapa
- The Viscount (1967) - Rico Barone
- Gente d'onore (1967) - Turi
- The Longest Hunt (1968) - Don Hernando Gutierrez
- Between God, the Devil and a Winchester (1968) - Colonel Bob Ford
- Mercanti di vergini (1969)
- Baltagul (1969) - oierul Bogza
- A Golden Widow (1969) - Le Sicilien - un tueur
- Trois hommes sur un cheval (1969) - Le patron d'Eric
- Raptus (1969) - Avv. Montani
- L'âne de Zigliara (1970)
- Tre nel mille (1971) - (final film role)
