= John Kitzmiller =

American actor (1913–1965)

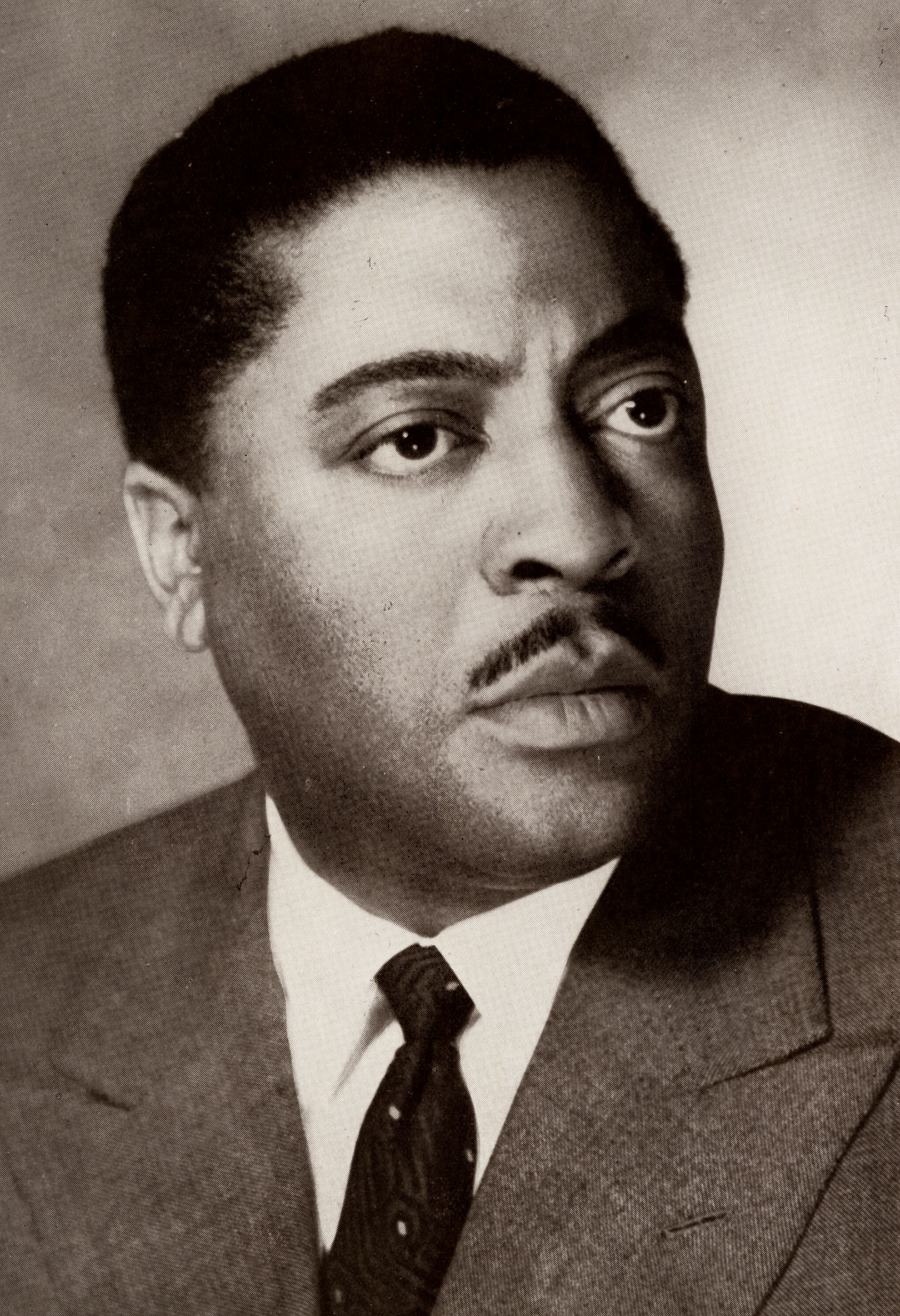
- Kitzmiller in 1954
- Born: December 4, 1913; Battle Creek, Michigan, U.S.
- Died: February 23, 1965 (aged 51); Rome, Italy
- Education: University of Michigan Chem. Eng.
- Years active: 1947–1965
- Spouse: Dusica Bejic (m. 1964)

John Kitzmiller (December 4, 1913 – February 23, 1965) was an American actor who had a career in Europe. Kitzmiller became an actor when he was cast in an Italian film while stationed in Italy with US troops. He eventually achieved fame as a popular and versatile actor in Europe and making an estimated 40 European films. He was the first Black actor to win the Cannes Film Festival Award for Best Actor in 1957 for his role in the Slovenian film Valley of Peace. He is now best remembered for his role as Quarrel in the first EON-produced James Bond movie, Dr. No.

== Early life ==
John Kitzmiller was born in Battle Creek, Michigan, the younger of two children born to John B. and Mary E. Kitzmiller. In high school Kitzmiller was a member of the Chemistry Club, and he later attended the University of Michigan, receiving a bachelor's degree in chemical engineering in 1937.

He was commissioned in the US Army reaching the rank of captain in the Corps of Engineers. He was stationed in Italy in 1943, serving with the 92nd Infantry Division during the Italian campaign of World War II. Both of his parents died during his military service, events which probably influenced his decision to become one of the few black soldiers to remain in Italy after the war.

== Acting career ==
Kitzmiller was discovered in 1946 by Luigi Zampa and Carlo Ponti while playing poker at an officers' club. This chance meeting led to his first acting role, in Zampa and Ponti's film To Live in Peace in 1947. Kitzmiller frequently worked in Italian neorealist films. He made Italy his permanent residence and ultimately starred in more than fifty European films, often portraying characters fighting racism.

He played the leading role of "Jerry" in the film Senza pietà (Without Pity), from a screenplay by Federico Fellini, Alberto Lattuada and Tullio Pinelli. He received awards commemorating both his role as an actor and as a soldier. In 1957, he was the first black actor to win a best actor award at the Cannes Film Festival for his role in the Slovenian film Valley of Peace. Kitzmiller is most famous for his role as Quarrel in the 1962 James Bond film Dr. No.

== Death ==
Kitzmiller died in Rome in 1965 of a liver ailment at the age of 51.

== Selected filmography ==
- To Live in Peace (1947) – Joe
- Tombolo, paradiso nero (1947) – Jack
- Senza pietà (1948) – Jerry Jackson
- Ti ritroverò (1949) – The MP
- The Monastery of Santa Chiara (1949) – Il negro
- The Force of Destiny (1950) – Lo scudiero moro
- Variety Lights (1950) – Trumpet player Johnny
- Wolves Hunt at Night (1952) – the black servant of Miguel
- Massacre in Lace (1952) – Rocky Saddler
- At Sword's Edge (1952)
- Final Pardon (1952)
- Delitto al luna park (1952)
- Legione straniera (1953) – Djalmar
- Frine, Courtesan of Orient (1953) – Nabus, lo schiavo muto
- Canto per te (1953) – Angenore
- Terra straniera (1954)
- Non vogliamo morire (1954) – John – il timoniere
- Quay of Blondes (1954) – Michel
- Desiderio 'e sole (1954) – Domestico di Sirovich
- La peccatrice dell'isola (1954) – Il Pescatore negro
- Il grande addio (1954)
- Acque amare (1954) – Mezzanotte
- Tears of Love (1954)
- Il nostro campione (1955) – Raimondo
- Valley of Peace (1956) – Sgt. Jim
- The Mysteries of Paris (1957) – Lo Squartatore
- A vent'anni è sempre festa (1957) – John Miller
- The Naked Earth (1958) – David
- Slave Women of Corinth (1958) – Tomoro
- Vite perdute (1959) – Luca
- Pensione Edelweiss (1959) – Bougron
- Due selvaggi a corte (1959) – Kato
- Seven in the Sun (1960) – Salvador
- Pirates of the Coast (1960) – Rock
- Revolt of the Mercenaries (1961) – Tago
- Totòtruffa 62 (1961) – Ambasciatore del Katonga
- La corona di fuoco (1961) – Akim
- Venus Against the Son of Hercules (1962) – Afros
- Il sangue e la sfida (1962)
- El hijo del capitán Blood (1962) – Moses
- Dr. No (1962) – Quarrel
- Tiger of the Seven Seas (1962) – Serpente
- Cave of the Living Dead (1964) – John – Black Servant
- Indios a Nord-Ovest (1964)
- Il ribelle di Castelmonte (1964) – Ali
- Uncle Tom's Cabin (1965) – Uncle Tom (final film role)
