= Piero Costa =

Italian screenwriter and film director

- Born: 4 June 1913; Tunis, French Tunisia
- Died: 24 April 1975 (aged 61); Rome, Lazio, Italy
- Occupations: Director, writer
- Years active: 1944–1962 (film)

Piero Costa (1913–1975) was an Italian screenwriter and film director.

== Selected filmography ==
- Aeroporto (1944)
- Barrier of the Law (1954)
- The Last Race (1954)
- The Girl of San Pietro Square (1958)
- Revolt of the Mercenaries (1961)

== Bibliography ==
- Roy Kinnard & Tony Crnkovich. Italian Sword and Sandal Films, 1908–1990. McFarland, 2017.
