= Attilio Dottesio =

Italian actor (1909–1989)

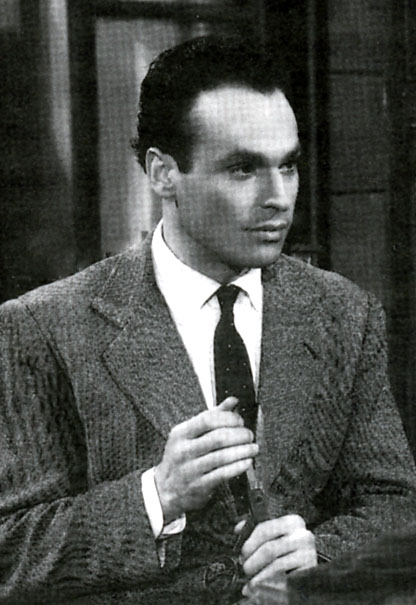
- Born: 16 July 1909; Brescia, Italy
- Died: 12 February 1989 (aged 79); Rome, Italy
- Occupations: Actor, singer
- Years active: 1940–1985

Attilio Dottesio (16 July 1909 – 12 February 1989) was an Italian film character actor and singer. He appeared in 170 films between 1940 and 1985.

Born in Brescia, Dottesio began his career in France, where first he obtained some success as a pop singer and later debuted as an actor in the film The Pearls of the Crown directed by Sacha Guitry. Back in Italy, he attended the Centro Sperimentale di Cinematografia in Rome, then he began an intense career as a character actor. His first Italian film was La peccatrice by Amleto Palermi (1940). In 1955, he had his only experience as a director, with the documentary film Amazzonia terra sconosciuta.

== Selected filmography ==
- The Pearls of the Crown (1937)
- The Sinner (1940)
- The Hero of Venice (1941)
- The Taming of the Shrew (1942)
- The Man with a Cross (1943)
- Giacomo the Idealist (1943)
- The Charterhouse of Parma (1948)
- The Wolf of the Sila (1949)
- Ring Around the Clock (1950)
- Cavalcade of Heroes (1950)
- Against the Law (1950)
- The Counterfeiters (1951)
- Wolves Hunt at Night (1952)
- Prisoner in the Tower of Fire (1952)
- It's Never Too Late (1953)
- Barrier of the Law (1954)
- Vanina Vanini (1961)
- Terror of the Steppes (1964)
- Two Escape from Sing Sing (1964)
- Full Hearts and Empty Pockets (1964)
- Gold Train (1965)
- Diamonds Are a Man's Best Friend (1966)
- No Diamonds for Ursula (1967)
- Shango (1970)
- A Barrel Full of Dollars (1971)
- Deadly Trackers (1972)
- Heroes in Hell (1973)
- Death Smiles at a Murderer (1973)
- Return of Shanghai Joe (1975)
- La bolognese (1975)
- Cuore di cane (1976)
- SS Experiment Camp (1976)
- I'm Photogenic (1980)
