= Escape to France =

1948 film

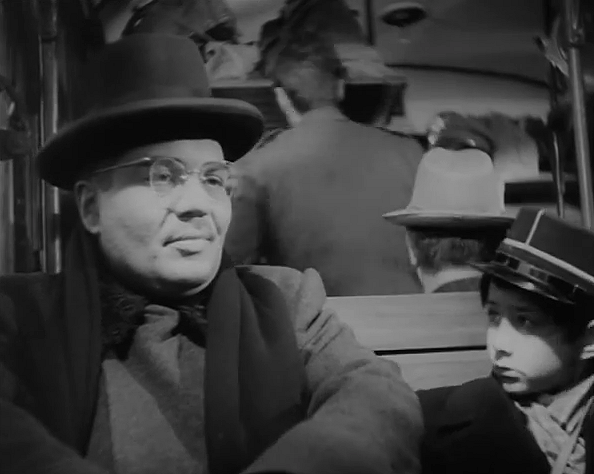
- Directed by: Mario Soldati
- Written by: Mario Bonfantini; Emilio Cecchi; Ennio Flaiano; Carlo Musso; Cesare Pavese; Agostino Richelmy; Mario Soldati
- Starring: Folco Lulli; Enrico Olivieri; Rosi Mirafiore
- Cinematography: Domenico Scala
- Edited by: Mario Bonotti
- Music by: Nino Rota
- Production company: Lux Film
- Distributed by: Lux Film
- Release date: August 1948
- Running time: 95 minutes
- Country: Italy
- Language: Italian

Escape to France (Italian: Fuga in Francia) is a 1948 Italian drama film directed by Mario Soldati and starring Folco Lulli, Enrico Olivieri and Rosi Mirafiore. The film's sets were designed by the art director Piero Gherardi. It premiered at the 1948 Venice Film Festival.

== Synopsis ==
A former Fascist takes his son and escapes across the border into France, where he tries to avoid being recognized and having to pay for his wartime crimes.

== Cast ==
- Folco Lulli as Riccardo Torre
- Enrico Olivieri as Fabrizio Torre
- Rosi Mirafiore as Pierina
- Pietro Germi as Tembien
- Mario Vercellone as Gino
- Giovanni Dufour as Il Tunisino
- Cesare Olivieri as don Giacomo
- Gino Apostolo as Policeman
- Gianni Luda as Bootlegger
- Mario Soldati as Stiffi

== Bibliography ==
- Curti, Roberto. Italian Giallo in Film and Television: A Critical History. McFarland, 2022.
- Mera, Miguel & Burnand, David. European Film Music. Ashgate Publishing, 2006.
- Moliterno, Gino. Historical Dictionary of Italian Cinema. Scarecrow Press, 2008.
