= Olinto Cristina =

Italian actor (1888–1962)

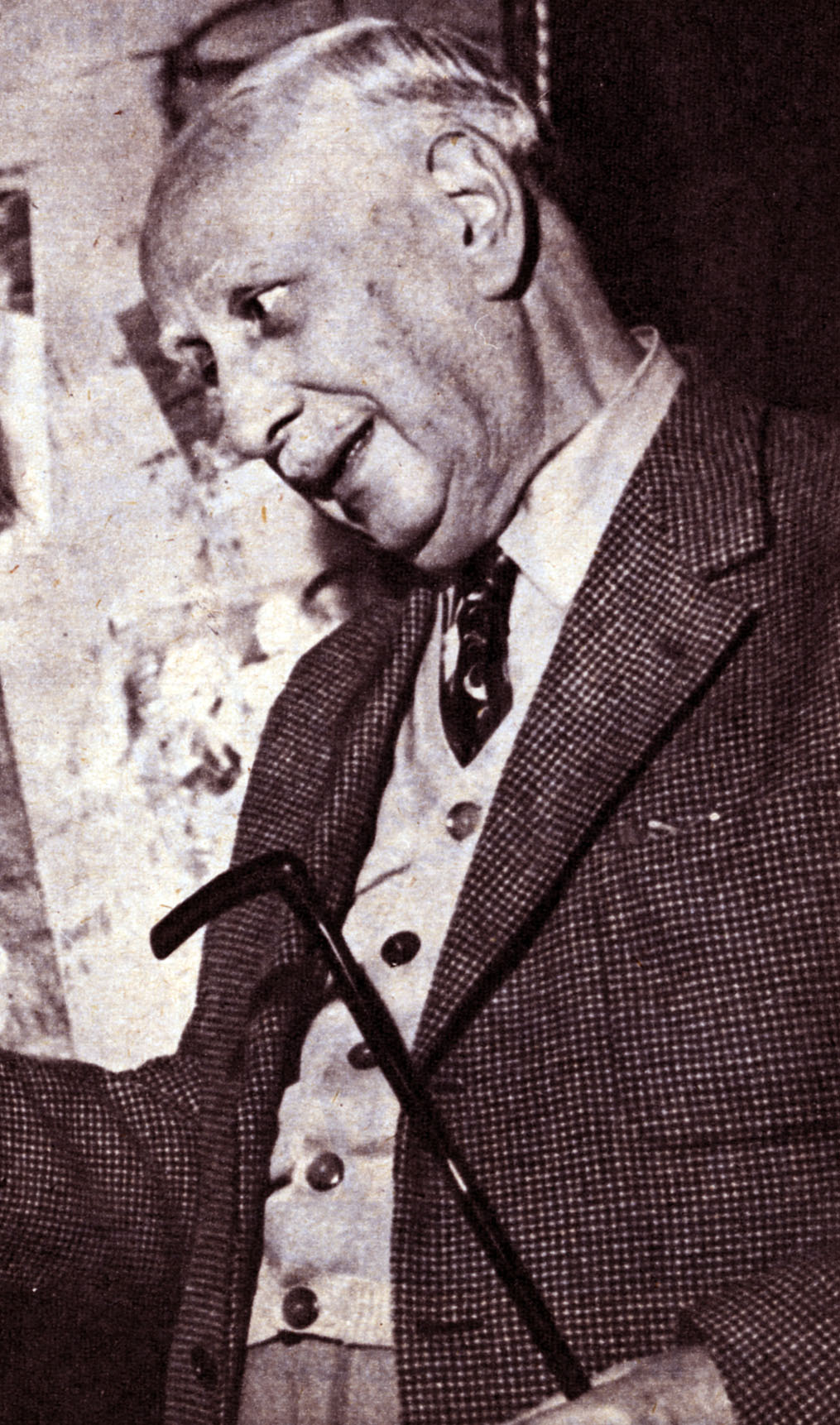
- Cristina in 1961
- Born: 5 February 1888; Florence, Italy
- Died: 17 June 1962 (aged 74); Rome, Italy
- Occupations: Actor; voice actor
- Years active: 1932–1962
- Spouse: Augusta Petoni
- Relatives: Ines Cristina Zacconi (sister); Ada Cristina Almirante (sister); Jone Frigerio (sister); Margherita Bagni (niece); Nora Ricci (great-niece)

Olinto Cristina (5 February 1888 – 17 June 1962) was an Italian actor and voice actor.

== Early life ==
Born in Florence to stage actors Raffaello Cristina and Cesira Sabatini, Cristina began acting on stage as a child, within the company of Tina Di Lorenzo and Flavio Andò.

== Career ==
Following World War I, he participated in various ensembles alongside local theatre personalities such as Armando Falconi, Ruggero Ruggeri, Emma Gramatica, Antonio Gandusio and his brother-in-law Ermete Zacconi. In 1956, he was among the actors to star in the first Italian theatrical production of The Crucible by Arthur Miller.

On screen, Cristina debuted during the sound period in the 1932 musical film Pergolesi, directed by Guido Brignone. He appeared in more than 75 films between 1932 and 1957, usually playing tertiary or supporting characters. He made his last film appearance in the 1957 film L'ultima violenza. Cristina also made ten appearances on television, debuting in the 1954 TV miniseries Doctor Antonio, directed by Alberto Casella.

Cristina was also a radio actor, reciting plays for RAI such as Look Back in Anger and Blood Wedding. He was also a renowned voice dubber in Italian post-synchronised versions of foreign films, usually providing his voice for actors such as C. Aubrey Smith, Sig Ruman, Frank Morgan and Lionel Barrymore. He also dubbed over the voices of Edward Everett Horton, Thomas Mitchell, Alan Hale Sr., Jay C. Flippen and more. In Cristina's animated roles, he provided the Italian voices of Doc in Snow White and the Seven Dwarfs as well as Friend Owl in Bambi and one of the crows in Dumbo. In 1949, he voiced Calif Oman in the 1949 animated film La Rosa di Bagdad.

== Personal life ==
Cristina was married to the actress Augusta Petoni. His sisters Ines Cristina Zacconi, Jone Frigerio and Ada Cristina Almirante were also actresses. His sister Ines was the mother of actress Margherita Bagni and the grandmother of actress Nora Ricci. Cristina died in Rome on 17 June 1962, aged 74. He was buried at Campo Verano.

== Filmography ==
=== Film ===
Year	Title	Role	Notes
1932	Pergolesi		
1933	Il treno delle 21,15		
1934	Creatures of the Night		
1934	Tenebre	Police inspector	
1935	I'll Give a Million	Police Commissioner	Uncredited
1935	The Joker King	Prussian ambassador	
1935	Red Passport	Il commissario di bordo del 'Marseille'	
1935	Ginevra degli Almieri	L'Abate di Badia	
1936	A Woman Between Two Worlds	Signor Trenchman	
1936	White Amazons	Biancheri	
1936	Pensaci, Giacomino!	Il preside della scuola	
1936	Adam's Tree	Prospero Pupini	
1936	Lo squadrone bianco	Donati	
1937	To Live	Un ascaltatore all'audizione	
1937	The Black Corsair	Rabouillon	
1937	Doctor Antonio	Ambasciatore inglese	
1937	Scipio Africanus: The Defeat of Hannibal	Ambasciatore	
1937	Felicita Colombo	L'ingegner Hirsch	
1938	Chi è più felice di me!	impresario Molchi	
1938	L'allegro cantante		
1938	Duetto vagabondo		
1938	Giuseppe Verdi	Il censore	
1939	The Sons of the Marquis Lucera	Matteo Tortorelli	
1939	Due occhi per non vedere		
1939	Diamonds		
1939	Piccolo hotel	Hermann Daniell	
1939	Cose dell'altro mondo	Procuratore generale	
1939	Wealth Without a Future		
1939	Dora Nelson	Il signor Gabardo	
1939	Ho visto brillare le stelle	Il presidente	
1939	The Boarders at Saint-Cyr	Il marchese di St. Herem	
1940	La última falla	Il giudice	Italian release
1940	Piccolo re		
1940	Le sorprese del vagone letto		
1940	Vento di milioni	Tim Browning	
1940	Big Shoes	Dossena	
1940	Antonio Meucci	Wilson	
1940	The Secret of Villa Paradiso	L'ispettore capo	
1940	One Hundred Thousand Dollars	Il comandante dell'aeroporto di Budapest	
1940	Amore di ussaro		
1940	Fortuna		
1940	The First Woman Who Passes	Il conte di Vervins	
1941	La canzone rubata	l'impresario di riviste Anselmi	
1941	Il bazar delle idee	Il commendator Parodi	
1941	La forza bruta	Colombier	
1941	L'elisir d'amore	Don Alvaro	
1941	Caravaggio, il pittore maledetto	Il cardinale Dal Monte	
1941	Lucky Night		
1941	Ridi pagliaccio	Bernardo Silvagni	
1941	The Betrothed	presidente del Tribunale di Sanità	
1942	Divieto di sosta		
1942	Le signorine della villa accanto		
1942	Love Story	Il presidente del tribunale	
1943	Il nostro prossimo		
1943	Principessina	Baron	
1943	The Children Are Watching Us	The Chancellor	
1943	No Turning Back	Il presidente	
1943	Silenzio, si gira!	Il produttore dell'Alba Film	
1943	Lucky Night		
1943	Farewell Love!	Dr. Montechiaro	
1943	In cerca di felicità	Direttore teatro	
1944	The Devil Goes to Boarding School	Il direttore del teatro	
1945	I'll Sing No More	Carlo Baratti	
1945	The Innocent Casimiro	Principal	
1946	Biraghin	Direttore	
1946	Un uomo ritorna		
1946	Uno tra la folla		
1946	Voglio bene soltanto a te!	Direttore dell'Aurora Film	
1948	Crossroads of Passion	Dr. Slaceck	
1948	Difficult Years	Sacchi	
1950	Due sorelle amano		
1950	Santo disonore		
1950	Romanzo d'amore	Count Contini	
1950	Il sentiero dell'odio		
1951	The Crowd		
1951	Operation Mitra		
1951	The Ungrateful Heart	L'avvocato amico di Enrico	
1951	Revenge of a Crazy Girl	Paola Micheli's father	
1952	The Eternal Chain	Maestro Vallini	
1952	The Overcoat	Professor Filini	
1952	Ragazze da marito	Commendator Spadoni	
1953	Noi peccatori	Surgeon	Uncredited
1953	It's Never Too Late	Franci	
1953	Canto per te		
1953	Torna!	Attorney	
1954	Schiava del peccato	Director	
1957	L'ultima violenza	Dr. Silvestri	

=== Television ===
Year	Title	Role	Notes
1954	Doctor Antonio		TV miniseries
1956	Lo scialle		
1957	Il romanzo di un giovane povero	Marchese Cristiano di Champcey	TV miniseries
1957	Viaggio verso l'ignoto		
1957	Piccolo mondo antico	Dr. Alipranti	TV miniseries
1957	Il gabbiano		
1959	La casa delle sette torri		
1960	Il costruttore Solness		TV play
1960	La pisana		TV miniseries
1962	La pecora bianca		TV play

== Voice work ==
Year	Title	Role	Notes
1950	La Rosa di Bagdad	Calif Oman	Animated film

=== Dubbing ===
==== Films (Animation, Italian dub) ====
Year	Title	Role(s)	Ref
1938	Snow White and the Seven Dwarfs	Doc	
1948	Dumbo	Crow #2	
1948	Bambi	Friend Owl	
1948	The Three Caballeros	Narrator of The Flying Gauchito	
1950	Cinderella	Jaq	
