= Lucky Night (1941 film) =

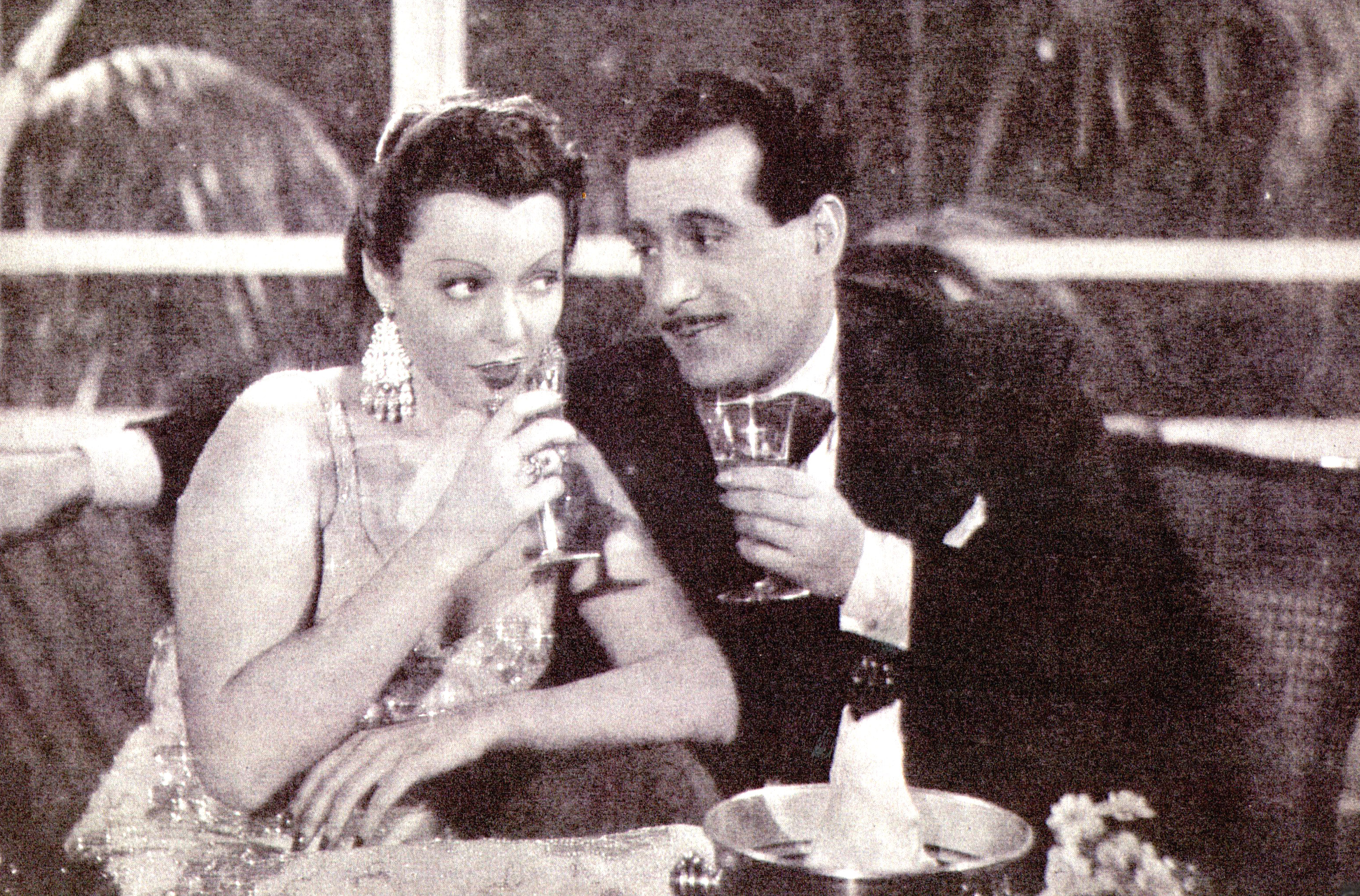
- Leda Gloria and Peppino De Filippo
- Directed by: Raffaello Matarazzo
- Written by: Riccardo Freda; Camillo Mariani Dell'Aguillara; Raffaello Matarazzo
- Starring: Peppino De Filippo; Leda Gloria; Vera Bergman
- Cinematography: Ugo Lombardi; Václav Vích
- Edited by: Angelo L. Comitti
- Music by: Dan Caslar
- Production company: Atesia Film
- Distributed by: ICI
- Release date: 2 February 1941
- Running time: 86 minutes
- Country: Italy
- Language: Italian

Lucky Night (Italian: Notte di fortuna) is a 1941 Italian "white-telephones" comedy film directed by Raffaello Matarazzo and starring Peppino De Filippo, Leda Gloria and Vera Bergman. It was the first film De Filippo starred in without his more famous brother Eduardo De Filippo.

It was shot at the Titanus Studios in Rome with sets designed by the art director Piero Rosi.

== Synopsis ==
A small town pharmacist's clerk goes to a San Remo casino and wins a major fortune in a single night of gambling. However, urged on by a mysterious woman, he subsequently loses it all.

== Cast ==
- Peppino De Filippo as Biagio Natalini
- Leda Gloria as La sorella del principale
- Vera Bergman as La ragazza misteriosa
- Olinto Cristina
- Gorella Gori
- Nino Marchetti
- Guido Notari
- Fausto Guerzoni
- Giulio Alfieri
- Iginia Armilli
- Gino Baghetti
- Luigi Barbieri
- Ciro Berardi
- Michele Malaspina
- Nicola Maldacea
- Lina Tartara Minora
- Silva Nova
- Giovanni Petrucci
- Cesare Pianigiani
- Domenico Serra
- Edda Soligo
- Olga von Kollar

== Bibliography ==
- Roberto Curti. Riccardo Freda: The Life and Works of a Born Filmmaker. McFarland, 2017.
