= Cavalcade of Heroes =

1950 film

- Directed by: Mario Costa
- Written by: Anton Giulio Majano; Fulvio Palmieri; Piero Ghione; Lamberto Giovagnoli; Mario Costa
- Produced by: Alberto Attili
- Starring: Cesare Danova; Carla Del Poggio; Vittorio Sanipoli; Camillo Pilotto
- Cinematography: Rodolfo Lombardi
- Edited by: Othello Colangeli
- Music by: Alessandro Cicognini
- Production company: Vulcania Film
- Release date: 21 April 1950
- Running time: 90 minutes
- Country: Italy
- Language: Italy

Cavalcade of Heroes (Italian: Cavalcata d'eroi) is a 1950 Italian historical melodrama film directed by Mario Costa and starring Cesare Danova, Carla Del Poggio and Vittorio Sanipoli. It depicts the events around the founding of the short-lived Roman Republic of 1849.

== Plot ==
Love story of a patriot and a girl with a noble lineage, already linked to a Frenchman, against the backdrop of the second assault of the French troops in Rome which took place between June 3 and July 2, 1849. With the French entry and victory, who install a provisional government, the two lovers will decide, once the differences of a social nature have been overcome, to follow Garibaldi's troops in Northern Italy.

== Partial cast ==
- Cesare Danova as Massimo Ruffo
- Carla Del Poggio as Giulia Fabbri
- Vittorio Sanipoli as Ottavio Monis
- Otello Toso as Angelo Masina
- Camillo Pilotto as Alessandro Fabbri
- Paola Borboni as La marchesa Ferrari
- Alfredo Varelli as Luciano Manara
- Carlo Tamberlani as Pisacane
- Ugo Sasso as Giuseppe Garibaldi
- Germana Paolieri as La duchessa
- Carlo Romano as Paolo Tassoni
- Marco Vicario as Mario
- Ave Ninchi as Aurelia
- Attilio Dottesio as Mazzini
- Mario Ferrari as Generale Odivot
- Dante Maggio as Ciccillo
- Arturo Dominici as Generale Gilletti
- Peppino Spadaro as Capitan Turi
- Achille Majeroni as Il vescovo

== Bibliography ==
- Moliterno, Gino (2008-09-29). Historical Dictionary of Italian Cinema. Scarecrow Press, Bloomsbury Publishing PLC. ISBN 978-0-8108-6254-8.
