= Vera Bergman =

German actress (1920–1971)

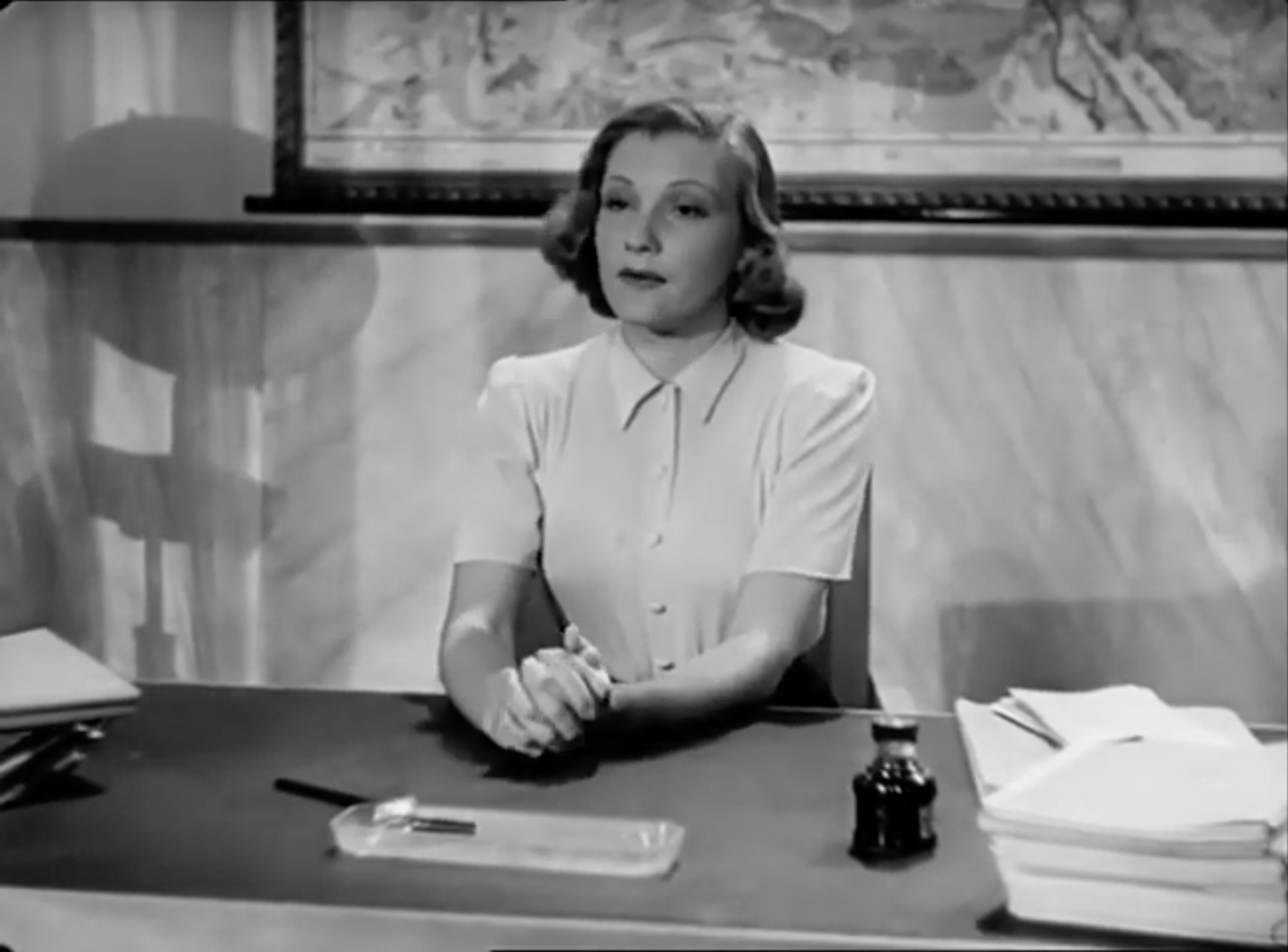
- Bergman in Maddalena, Zero for Conduct (1940)
- Born: 16 February 1920; Germany
- Died: 1971 (aged 50–51)
- Other name: Vera von Bergman
- Occupation: Actor
- Years active: 1938–1954 (film)

Vera Bergman (16 February 1920 – 1971) was a German stage and film actress known for her roles in Italian films. Bergman died in 1971.

== Biography ==
Vera Bergmann was the daughter of Dutch diplomat Carl Bergman. Her mother was of Austrian descent. She attended an acting school under the direction of Max Reinhardt after her studies in The Hague. This enabled her later theater career in various European cities including Prague, Rome and also Berlin. In Germany, after her schooling, she became a part of the acting ensemble Deutsches Theater Berlin.

In her native Germany, she starred in only three films before shifting her career to Italy. There she was given the most important film roles of her life, including in the 1939 film Maddalena, zero in condotta directed by Vittorio De Sica. Here the still very young Vera Bergman played the understanding and loving teacher Elisa Malgari, who teaches in a girls' school where she comes into conflict with her colleagues. The film was a great success with the public in 1940 and was highly appreciated by the critics of the time.

Bergman's roles were characterized by great professionalism and helped her to a respectable career during the years of World War II. After the war, things became increasingly quiet around Vera Bergman. She increasingly appeared in more mediocre films, with the exception of Luigi Capuano's Legge di sangue, in which she played the role of a contemptible and obscure noblewoman very successfully. By her own account, she played about 25 leading roles and had other supporting roles also in America, England, Switzerland and Holland. In her time, she represented an important part of Italian neorealism, which had a lasting influence on the international film world between 1945 and 1955. On February 7, 1951, she married journalist Peter Anthony Vasquez Russo in Melbourne at the age of 30. The two remained childless.

== Selected filmography ==
- The Stars Shine (1938)
- Maddalena, Zero for Conduct (1940)
- Lucky Night (1941)
- The Man on the Street (1941)
- The Champion (1943)
- Non canto più (1945)
- Teheran (1946)
- The Two Orphans (1947)
- Songs in the Streets (1950)
- The Last Race (1954)

== Bibliography ==
- Bondanella, Peter. A History of Italian Cinema. A&C Black, 2009.
