= Revolt of the Mercenaries =

- Directed by: Piero Costa
- Written by: Antonio Boccaci; Piero Costa; Eduardo Falletti; Carlo Musso; Luciano Vincenzoni
- Produced by: Antonio Canelli
- Starring: Virginia Mayo; Conrado San Martín; Susana Canales
- Cinematography: Julio Ortas; Godofredo Pacheco
- Edited by: Julio Peña; Mario Serandrei
- Music by: Carlo Innocenzi
- Production companies: Chapalo Films; Prodas; Rewind Film
- Distributed by: Imperialcine
- Release date: 27 July 1961
- Running time: 98 minutes
- Countries: Italy; Spain
- Language: Italian

Revolt of the Mercenaries (Italian: La rivolta dei mercenari) is a 1961 Italian-Spanish historical adventure film directed by Piero Costa and starring Virginia Mayo, Conrado San Martín and Susana Canales.

The film's sets were designed by the art directors Saverio D'Eugenio and Augusto Lega.

== Cast ==
- Virginia Mayo as Lady Patrizia, Duchessa di Rivalta
- Conrado San Martín as Capitano Lucio Di Rialto
- Susana Canales as Katia
- Livio Lorenzon as Conte Keller Paroli
- Carla Calò as Miriam du Marchant
- Franco Fantasia as Ilario
- Alfredo Mayo as Marco
- John Kitzmiller as Tago
- Tomás Blanco as Capitano Brann
- Anita Todesco as Prisca
- Pilar Cansino as Simonetta
- Marco Tulli as Stefano - Principe di Siena
- Luciano Benetti as One of Lucio's Men
- Enzo Fiermonte as Cizzania
- Amedeo Trilli as Pintar, Katia's Father
- Marilù Sangiorgi as Gypsy Girl
- Xan das Bolas as Katia's Companion
- Ángel del Pozo as Arrigo
- Diana Lorys as Nora
- Franco Pesce as Old Man
- Alberto Cevenini as Alessandro

== Bibliography ==
- Roy Kinnard & Tony Crnkovich. Italian Sword and Sandal Films, 1908–1990. McFarland, 2017.
