= The Bandit (1946 film) =

1946 film

- German poster
- Directed by: Alberto Lattuada
- Written by: Oreste Biancoli; Mino Caudana; Alberto Lattuada; Ettore Margadonna; Tullio Pinelli; Piero Tellini
- Produced by: Dino De Laurentiis
- Starring: Anna Magnani; Amedeo Nazzari; Carla Del Poggio
- Cinematography: Aldo Tonti
- Edited by: Mario Bonotti
- Music by: Felice Lattuada
- Production company: Lux Film
- Distributed by: Lux Film
- Release date: 5 October 1946
- Running time: 80 minutes
- Country: Italy
- Language: Italian

The Bandit (Italian: Il bandito) is a 1946 Italian drama crime film directed by Alberto Lattuada and starring Anna Magnani, Amedeo Nazzari and Carla Del Poggio. It was shot on location in Turin. Nazzari won the Nastro d'Argento as Best Actor for his performance. The film was entered into the 1946 Cannes Film Festival.

== Plot ==
A contingent of Italian prisoners of war arrive on a train from Germany after World War II to Turin. The city where Ernesto (played by Nazzari) lives has been bombed, his mother is dead and his sister has gone missing. State help for returning veterans is scant and bureaucracy rampant. Ernesto tries to get an honest job, but fails. After finding a lost purse and meeting the dangerously seductive Lidia (played by Anna Magnani), Ernesto discovers the whereabouts of his lost sister (played by Carla del Poggio), who has turned to prostitution to survive during the war years. He unwittingly causes her death, kills her pimp, escapes capture with Lidia's help and joins her gangster band.

== Cast ==
- Anna Magnani as Lidia
- Amedeo Nazzari as Ernesto
- Carla Del Poggio as Maria
- Carlo Campanini as Carlo
- Eliana Banducci as Rosetta
- Mino Doro as Mirko
- Folco Lulli as Andrea
- Mario Perrone as Il gobbo
- Amato Garbini as Il tenutario
- Gianni Appelius as Signorina
- Ruggero Madrigali as Il negriero
- Thea Aimaretti as Tecla, la padrona
- Alessandro Tedeschi as Stefano Albertini

== Bibliography ==
- Gundle, Stephen. Fame Amid the Ruins: Italian Film Stardom in the Age of Neorealism. Berghahn Books, 2019.
- Reeves, Nicholas. The Power of Film Propaganda: Myth or Reality?. Continuum, 2003.
