= Non canto più =

- Directed by: Riccardo Freda
- Screenplay by: Vittorio Metz; Stefano Vanzina; Riccardo Freda
- Story by: Vittorio Metz; Stefano Vanzina; Riccardo Freda
- Produced by: Vittorio Vassarotti
- Starring: Enzo Fiermonte; Vera Bergman; Paola Borboni; Lamberto Picasso
- Cinematography: Alfonso Frenguelli
- Edited by: Rolando Benedetti
- Music by: Nuccio Fiorda
- Production company: Vi-Va Film
- Distributed by: Variety Film
- Release date: 30 September 1945 (Italy)
- Running time: 79 minutes
- Country: Italy

Non canto più (transl. I'll Sing No More) is a 1945 Italian comedy film directed by Riccardo Freda and starring Enzo Fiermonte, Vera Bergman and Paola Borboni. The film originally began shooting several years earlier, but its production was heavily delayed due to wartime conditions and it wasn't released until 1945.

== Cast ==
- Enzo Fiermonte as Il tenore Guido Revi
- Vera Bergman as Lisa Baratti
- Paola Borboni as L'impresaria teatrale Greta Arden
- Virgilio Riento as Roberto
- Giuseppe Porelli as Adolfo
- Olinto Cristina as Carlo Baratti, padre di Lisa
- Arturo Bragaglia as Il commissario
- Lamberto Picasso as L'ispettore Carter
- Agnese Dubbini as La cuoca di casa Baratti
- Giuseppe Pierozzi as Il fattore

== Production ==
Following Freda's directorial debut with Don Cesare di Bazan, he found his next project he wanted to work on was rejected he wanted to make L'atleta di cristallo (transl. The Crystal Athlete), a film about the behind the scenes world of boxing, was rejected. Freda stated that his next film Non canto più then developed after he met Leo Longanesi and Mario Pannunzio at Rome's Imperiale theater. While there he met with a producer who had dreams about developing a film with American actors Gary Cooper and Ingrid Bergman. Freda said the production led its course without the American actors and what he called "some unknown, nondescript Italian thesp...[...] Acoordin to [the producer], I would direct a film with Gary Cooper, and found myself with Enzo Fiermonte, the contender for the world boxing championship and a pathetic actor." Fiermonte had abandoned boxing in 1934 and after attempting car racing, he went into acting in 1941. Freda developed the script for the film with Stefano Vanzina and Vittorio Metz.

Non canto più was shot in 1943 at Titanus Studios in Rome. Despite being filmed in 1943, the film was shelved for two years due to fall of fascism in Italy, Benito Mussolini's arrest and the armistice.

== Release ==
Non canto più was distributed theatrically in Italy by Variety Film on 30 September 1945.
