= Storms (film) =

1953 film

- French film poster
- Directed by: Guido Brignone
- Written by: Guido Brignone; Alessandro De Stefani; René Lefèvre; Sabatino Lopez; Carlo Musso
- Starring: Jean Gabin; Silvana Pampanini; Carla Del Poggio
- Cinematography: Mario Montuori
- Edited by: Jolanda Benvenuti
- Music by: Ettore Montanaro
- Production companies: Titanus; Daunia Film; Société Générale de Cinématographie
- Distributed by: Les Films Marceau; Titanus
- Release date: 6 February 1953 (Italy)
- Running time: 92 minutes
- Countries: France; Italy
- Languages: French, Italian

Storms or Dangerous Girl (Italian: Bufere, French: Fille dangereuse) is a 1953 French-Italian melodrama film directed by Guido Brignone and starring Jean Gabin, Silvana Pampanini and Carla Del Poggio. It was shot at the Farnesina Studios of Titanus in Rome. The film's sets were designed by the art director Ottavio Scotti. Location shooting took place around Perugia where the film is set.

== Synopsis ==
A renowned surgeon becomes involved with an attractive circus trapeze artist with the relationship threatening his marriage and family life.

== Cast ==
- Jean Gabin as Il professor Antonio Sanna
- Silvana Pampanini (French version: Raymonde Devarennes) as Daisy Parnell
- Carla Del Poggio (French version: Camille Fournier) as Maria Sanna
- Serge Reggiani as Sergio (Serge) Parnell
- Mario Ferrari as Il prefetto
- Enrico Olivieri as Mario Sanna
- Paolo Stoppa as Amedeo Cini (Italian version)
- René Lefèvre as Amédée Didier (French version)
- Bruno Smith as Il presentatore al teatro
- Edda Soligo as Un'infermiera

== Bibliography ==
- Bayman, Louis. The Operatic and the Everyday in Postwar Italian Film Melodrama. Edinburgh University Press, 2014.
- Chiti, Roberto & Poppi, Roberto. Dizionario del cinema italiano: Dal 1945 al 1959. Gremese Editore, 1991.
- Gundle, Stephen. Fame Amid the Ruins: Italian Film Stardom in the Age of Neorealism. Berghahn Books, 2019.
- Harriss, Joseph. Jean Gabin: The Actor Who Was France. McFarland, 2018.
