= Valley of Peace (film) =

1956 film

- Film poster
- Directed by: France Štiglic
- Written by: Ivan Ribič
- Starring: John Kitzmiller
- Cinematography: Rudi Vaupotič
- Edited by: Radojka Tanhofer
- Music by: Marjan Kozina
- Release date: 23 July 1956
- Running time: 82 minutes
- Country: Yugoslavia
- Language: Slovene

Valley of Peace (Slovene: Dolina miru) is a 1956 Yugoslavian (Slovenian) war film directed by France Štiglic. It was in competition at the 1957 Cannes Film Festival, where John Kitzmiller received the Best Actor award for his role as Sgt. Jim.

The film was selected for screening as part of the Cannes Classics section at the 2016 Cannes Film Festival.

== Cast ==
- John Kitzmiller as Sgt. Jim
- Evelyne Wohlfeiler as Lotti
- Tugo Štiglic as Marko
- Boris Kralj as Sturmführer
- Maks Furijan as Scharführer
- Janez Čuk as Leader
- Franjo Kumer as German soldier
- Polde Dežman as Kommissar (uncredited)
- Rudi Kosmač as Second lieutenant (uncredited)
- Pero Škerl as Kommandant (uncredited)
