= Wolves Hunt at Night =

1952 film

- Directed by: Bernard Borderie
- Written by: Bernard Borderie; Francis Thuret
- Based on: Le Lieutenant de Gibraltar by Pierre Frondaie
- Produced by: Raymond Borderie
- Starring: Jean-Pierre Aumont; Carla Del Poggio; Fernand Ledoux
- Cinematography: Jacques Lemare
- Edited by: Henri Taverna
- Music by: Joseph Kosma
- Production companies: CICC; Fono Roma
- Distributed by: Pathé Consortium Cinéma
- Release date: 6 February 1952
- Running time: 98 minutes
- Countries: France; Italy
- Language: French

Wolves Hunt at Night (French: Les Loups chassent la nuit, Italian: La ragazza di Trieste) is a 1952 French-Italian spy thriller film directed by Bernard Borderie and starring Jean-Pierre Aumont, Carla Del Poggio and Fernand Ledoux. It was shot at the Billancourt Studios in Paris and on location in Trieste and Venice. The film's sets were designed by the art director René Moulaert.

== Synopsis ==
A French secret agent is summoned by his superior, the head of a counterespionage organisation, to Trieste where he is takes with trying to unmask a potential enemy operating in Venice. His attempts are obstructed by an attractive cabaret singer who may be working with the opposition.

== Cast ==
- Jean-Pierre Aumont as Cyril Dormoy, an agent of Mollert
- Carla Del Poggio as Catherine, the friend of Cyril, singer of cabaret
- Fernand Ledoux as Thomas Mollert, journalist and leader of a spy ring of counterespionage
- Marcel Herrand as Pedro, the director of cabaret
- John Kitzmiller as the black servant of Miguel
- Roldano Lupi as Miguel, spy and salable falsehood of pictures
- Nicolas Vogel as Jim, the driver of Mollert
- Attilio Dottesio as Baum, alias: "Horner", a spy
- Gianni Rizzo as the Italian commissioner
- Sophie Sel as an employee of the hotel
- Louis de Funès as the barman servant
- Tancrédi as the driver

== Bibliography ==
- Gili, Jean A. & Tassone, Aldo. Parigi-Roma: 50 anni di coproduzioni italo-francesi (1945–1995). Editrice Il castoro, 1995.
- Marie, Michel. The French New Wave: An Artistic School. John Wiley & Sons, 2008.
