= The Wanderers (1956 film) =

- Directed by: Hugo Fregonese
- Written by: Luigi Capuana; Giuseppe Berto; Salvatore Danò; Daniele D'Anza; Luciano Vincenzoni; Piero Vivarelli
- Produced by: Domenico Forges-Davanzati; Gilberto Rossini; Franco Villani
- Starring: Peter Ustinov; Carla Del Poggio; Abbe Lane
- Cinematography: Alvaro Mancori
- Music by: Angelo Francesco Lavagnino
- Production companies: Iniziative Cinematografiche Internazionali; Villani-Rossini
- Release date: 18 July 1956
- Running time: 95 minutes
- Country: Italy
- Language: Italian

The Wanderers (Italian: I girovaghi) is a 1956 Italian drama film directed by Hugo Fregonese and starring Peter Ustinov, Carla Del Poggio and Abbe Lane. It is based on a story by Luigi Capuana. The film's sets were designed by the art director Luigi Scaccianoce.

== Cast ==
- Peter Ustinov as Don Alfonso Pugliesi
- Carla Del Poggio as Lia
- Abbe Lane as Dolores
- Gaetano Autiero as Il piccolo Calogero detto Cardello
- Giuseppe Porelli as Prof. Kroll
- Rocco D'Assunta as Un corteggiatore di Dolores
- Angelo Dessy as Un mafioso
- Luciano Vincenzoni

== Bibliography ==
- Moliterno, Gino. The A to Z of Italian Cinema. Scarecrow Press, 2009.
