= Maddalena, Zero for Conduct =

1940 film by Vittorio De Sica

- Film poster
- Directed by: Vittorio De Sica
- Written by: Ferruccio Biancini
- Based on: Magda Expelled 1938 Hungarian film by Ladislao Vajda; Magdát kicsapják 1938 Hungarian play by Miklós Kádár László Kádár
- Produced by: Franco Magli
- Starring: Vittorio De Sica; Vera Bergman; Carla Del Poggio; Irasema Dilián
- Cinematography: Mario Albertelli
- Edited by: Mario Bonotti
- Music by: Nuccio Fiorda
- Production company: Artisti Associati
- Distributed by: Artisti Associati
- Release date: 18 December 1940
- Running time: 79 minutes
- Country: Italy
- Language: Italian

Maddalena, Zero for Conduct (Italian: Maddalena... zero in condotta) is a 1940 Italian "white-telephones" comedy film directed by Vittorio De Sica. It is a remake of the Hungarian film Magda Expelled (1938).

== Plot ==
A mysterious love letter arrives to Alfredo Hartman (Vittorio De Sica) in Vienna, and he goes to Rome to find who wrote it.

== Cast ==
- Vittorio De Sica as Alfredo Hartman
- Vera Bergman as L'insegnante Elisa Malgari
- Carla Del Poggio as Maddalena Lenci
- Irasema Dilián as Eva Barta, la privatista (as Eva Dilian)
- Amelia Chellini as La direttrice
- Pina Renzi as La professoressa Varzi
- Paola Veneroni as L'allieva Varghetti, la spiona
- Dora Bini as L'allieva Caricati
- Enza Delbi as Un'allieva
- Roberto Villa as Stefano Armani
- Armando Migliari as Malesci, il professore di chimica
- Guglielmo Barnabò as Il signor Emilio Lenci
- Giuseppe Varni as Amilcare Bondani, il bidello
- Arturo Bragaglia as Sila, il professore di ginnastica

== Bibliography ==
- Cardullo, Bert. Vittorio De Sica: Actor, Director, Auteur. Cambridge Scholars Publishing, 2009.
