= Enzo Fiermonte =

Italian film actor, director and boxer (1908–1993)

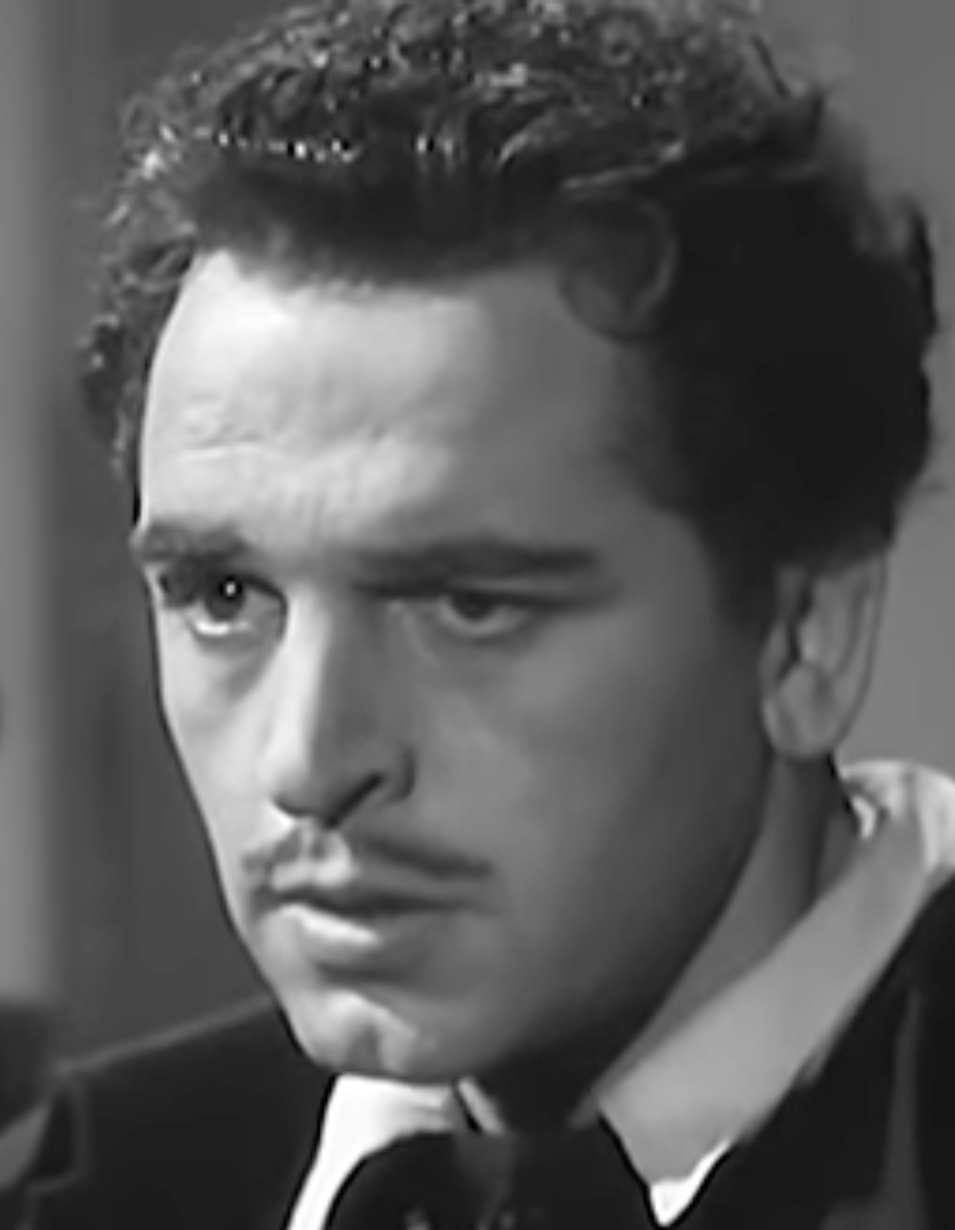
- Fiermonte in Beatrice Cenci (1941)
- Born: Vincenzo Fiermonte; 17 July 1908; Casamassima, Apulia, Italy
- Died: 22 March 1993 (aged 84); Mentana, Lazio, Italy
- Other name: William Bird
- Occupations: Actor, boxer
- Years active: 1941–1979
- Spouse(s): Tosca Manetti (m. 1929; div. 1933) Madeleine Astor (m. 1933; div. 1938)
- Children: John Fiermonte

Enzo Fiermonte (17 July 1908 – 22 March 1993), sometimes credited as William Bird, was an Italian actor and boxer.

== Early life ==
Vincenzo "Enzo" Fiermonte was born on 17 July 1908 in Casamassima, a rural village near Bari, in southern Italy to Donato and Lucrezia Fiermonte.

== Career ==
From 1925 to 1934, he was a professional boxer, with a lifetime record of 47 wins (11 by knockout), 17 losses (10 by knockout), and 2 draws. On June 22, 1943, he announced his permanent retirement from boxing.

In 1937, he entered his Maserati in the Vanderbilt Cup auto race in Westbury, New York, but was not allowed to participate because he had no formal auto racing experience.

=== Acting career ===
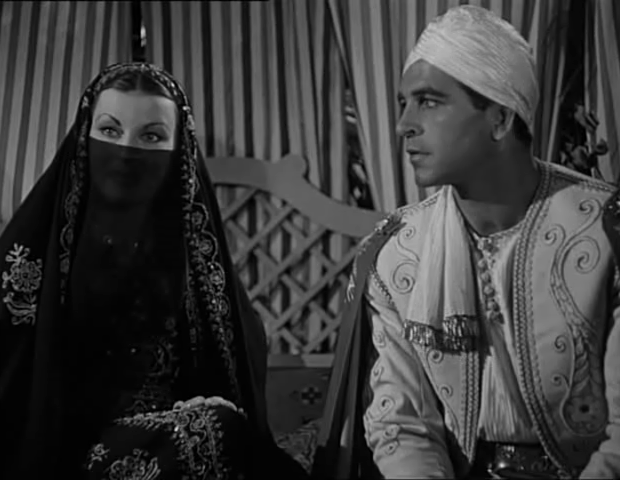
Silvana Pampanini and Fiermonte in a scene from the 1950 film Hawk of the Nile

In 1940, he starred as a boxer in Dino De Laurentiis' first film, L'ultimo Combattimento (The Last Fight), directed by Pietro Ballerini. Between the 1940s and the 1980s, he had acting roles in at least 116 films.

== Personal life ==
Fiermonte married Tosca Manetti in 1929. In June 1933, Fiermonte's wife announced that he was seeking a divorce so he could wed Madeleine Talmage Force (1893–1940), the former wife of John Jacob Astor IV, who died aboard the RMS Titanic.

Fiermonte married Madeleine on 27 November 1933 in New York City, shortly after her divorce from her second husband, William Dick, on 21 July 1933. In 1935, they bought the former Dixie Plantation, a 600-acre estate in Charleston, South Carolina overlooking the Stono River.

They were divorced on 11 June 1938. He was only four years older than his stepson, John Jacob Astor VI, during the marriage. In 1944, he allegedly got engaged in Italy to Princess Giulia von Rio, but they never married.

Fiermonte died in March 1993 in Mentana, Italy.

== Selected filmography ==
- L'ultimo combattimento (1941) - Bruno Dal Monte
- Beatrice Cenci (1941) - Olimpio Calvetti
- Il chiromante (1941) - Paolo
- Il mercante di schiave (1942) - Alì
- The Adventures of Fra Diavolo (1942) - Michele Pezza / Fra' Diavolo
- Spie fra le eliche (1943) - L'ispettore Enzo Massa
- The Champion (1943) - Massimo
- The Last Wagon (1943) - Roberto Pinelli, l'autista
- Finalmente sì (1944) - Il conte Alberto
- No Turning Back (1945) - Mario Ponte
- L'abito nero da sposa (1945) - Giuliano de Medici
- Non canto più (1945) - Il tenore Guido Revi
- Tehran (1946)
- Uno tra la folla (1946) - Marco
- L'atleta di cristallo (1946) - Franco Adami - pugile
- Buried Alive (1949) - Bruno
- Buffalo Bill a Roma (1949) - Buffalo Bill
- Son of d'Artagnan (1950) - Visconte di Langlass
- Hawk of the Nile (1950) - Sceicco Rachid
- The Two Sisters (1950) - Barone Enrico
- Quo Vadis (1951) - Mounted Captain (uncredited)
- O.K. Nerone (1951) - Gladiator
- The Small Miracle (1951) - Sergeant of Swiss Guards
- The Mistress of Treves (1952) - Il barone Drago
- When in Rome (1952) - Harbor Policeman (uncredited)
- Lieutenant Giorgio (1952) - Antonio Esposito (uncredited)
- The Shameless Sex (1952)
- Milady and the Musketeers (1952)
- I Piombi di Venezia (1953)
- It Was She Who Wanted It! (1953) - Fiermonte
- Lasciateci in pace (1953)
- I misteri della giungla nera (1954) - Sergeant Claridge
- Black Devils of Kali (1954) - Sgt. Claridge
- Cose da pazzi (1954) - Paolo
- The Last Race (1954) - Filippo
- Romeo and Juliet (1954) - Tybalt
- Angela (1954) - Sgt. Collins
- Loves of Three Queens (1954) - (Segment: The Face That Launched a Thousand Ships) (uncredited)
- I cavalieri della regina (1954) - Prince of Condé
- Barrier of the Law (1954)
- Sultana Safiyè (1955)
- Altair (1956)
- The Knight of the Black Sword (1956) - Mario
- The King's Musketeers (1957) - Brissac
- La spada imbattibile (1957) - Brissac
- The Goddess of Love (1957)
- Amarti è il mio destino (1957) - Juan
- Il cocco di mamma (1958) - Michele, Vasco's father
- Il cielo brucia (1958)
- The Naked Maja (1958) - Navarra (uncredited)
- Herod the Great (1959)
- Head of a Tyrant (1959)
- Poor Millionaires (1959) - Vittorio, Alice's Chauffeur (uncredited)
- Ben-Hur (1959) - Galley Officer (uncredited)
- Hannibal (1959) - Announcer in Senate
- The Cossacks (1960) - Shamil's Confident
- Conspiracy of Hearts (1960) - Italian Soldier #2
- Rocco and His Brothers (1960) - Boxer
- Pirates of the Coast (1960) - Mascella
- The Pharaohs' Woman (1960)
- The Bacchantes (1961) - Policrates (uncredited)
- Revolt of the Mercenaries (1961) - Cizzania
- Damon and Pythias (1962)
- The Slave (1962) - Gulbar - slave wrestling Randus
- Eva (1962) - Enzo
- Sodom and Gomorrah (1962) - Eber
- The Avenger (1962) - Acate
- Catherine of Russia (1963) - general Munic
- Sandokan the Great (1963) - Sergente Mitchell
- Temple of the White Elephant (1964) - Sgt. Major (uncredited)
- Messalina vs. the Son of Hercules (1964)
- The Lion of Thebes (1964) - Ufficiale di Tutmès
- The Triumph of Hercules (1964) - Reto
- The Two Gladiators (1964) - Gen. Ottavio Cratico
- The Secret Invasion (1964) - Gen. Quadri
- Triumph of the Ten Gladiators (1964) - Rizio
- Spartacus and the Ten Gladiators (1964) - Gladiator Rizio
- Kidnapped to Mystery Island (1964)
- I due toreri (1964) - Capitano Nave
- I predoni del Sahara (1965) - James Stanton
- Wild, Wild Planet (1966) - General Fowler
- War of the Planets (1966) - Gen. Halstead
- War Between the Planets (1966) - Gen. Norton
- After the Fox (1966) - Raymond
- The Ugly Ones (1966) - Novak
- Grand Prix (1966) - Guido
- Snow Devils (1967) - General Norton
- Halleluja for Django (1967) - Sheriff Martin Cooney
- Fantabulous Inc. (1967) - General Van Pelt
- A Long Ride from Hell (1968) - Baldy Morris
- Beyond the Law (1968) - Sheriff John Ferguson
- A Minute to Pray, a Second to Die (1968) - Dr. Chase
- A Black Veil for Lisa (1968) - Siegert
- The Magnificent Tony Carrera (1968) - Arnaldo
- Candy (1968) - Al Pappone
- I quattro del pater noster (1969)
- Camille 2000 (1969) - Gambler
- The Forgotten Pistolero (1969) - Friar (uncredited)
- Boot Hill (1969) - Sharp
- Chuck Moll (1970) - Sheriff
- The Golden Ass (1970) - Proconsul
- Strogoff (1970) - Colonel with general Dubelt
- Defeat of the Mafia (1970) - Count Torreguardia
- The Tigers of Mompracem (1970) - Sergeant
- Lady Caliph (1970) - L'operaio sindacalista
- Les Aveux les plus doux (1971)
- Vengeance Is a Dish Served Cold (1971) - George Bridger
- Scipio the African (1971) - senatore Quinto
- Trinity Is Still My Name (1971) - Perla's Father
- My Dear Killer (1972) - Jib crane owner
- Lo chiamavano Verità (1972)
- Man of the East (1972) - Frank Olsen
- The Mechanic (1972) - The Mark
- Those Dirty Dogs (1973) - Doctor Adams
- Dagli archivi della polizia criminale (1973) - Inspector Vernon
- Anche gli angeli tirano di destro (1974) - Joe Bendaggio (uncredited)
- The Beast (1974) - Matteo Zaghi
- Mannaja (1977) - Government Agent
- A Spiral of Mist (1977) - Mr. Marinoni
- California (1977) - Father of northern soldier
- I Am the Law (1977)
- 6000 km di paura (1978)
- The Iron Commissioner (1978) - Engineer
- Life Is Beautiful (1979) - Zhozo (final film role)
