= The Last Race (1954 film) =

- Directed by: Piero Costa
- Written by: Carlo Leopoldo Basile; Piero Costa
- Starring: Vera Bergman; Enzo Fiermonte; Checco Durante
- Cinematography: Francesco Raitano
- Edited by: Lia Massimo
- Music by: Corrado Pintaldi
- Production company: Sesia Film
- Distributed by: Zelica Film
- Release date: 23 May 1954
- Country: Italy
- Language: Italian

The Last Race (Italian: L'ultima gara) is a 1954 Italian drama film directed by Piero Costa and starring Vera Bergman, Enzo Fiermonte and Checco Durante. Production began in 1949, but was not completed until 1953 with the film given its release the following year. It earned just under 30 million lire at the box office.

== Synopsis ==
Two rowers are both in love with the same woman while training for a race on the River Tiber.

== Cast ==
- Vera Bergman as Sandra
- Enzo Fiermonte as Filippo
- Checco Durante as Sor Giggi
- Franco Silva as Marco
- Franco Pesce as Piuma
- Dante Serra as Carlo
- Anna Maria Dionisi as Severina
- Margherita Bossi as Madre di Severina
- Arturo Dominici Doctor Magni
- Mario Lodolini as Cristofari
- Irene Quattrini as Nurse
- Felice Romano as Padron Giulio

== Bibliography ==
- Chiti, Roberto & Poppi, Roberto. Dizionario del cinema italiano: Dal 1945 al 1959. Gremese Editore, 1991.
