= The Champion (1943 film) =

- Directed by: Carlo Borghesio
- Written by: Carlo Borghesio; Enzo Fiermonte; Tomaso Smith
- Starring: Enzo Fiermonte; Vera Bergman; Erminio Spalla
- Cinematography: Giovanni Pucci; Aldo Tonti
- Edited by: Carlo Borghesio; Gisa Radicchi Levi
- Music by: Giuseppe Savagnone
- Production companies: Industrie Cinematografiche Italiane; Leo Film
- Distributed by: Variety Distribution
- Release date: February 1943
- Running time: 85 minutes
- Country: Italy
- Language: Italian

The Champion (Italian: Il campione) is a 1943 Italian sports film directed by Carlo Borghesio and starring Enzo Fiermonte, Vera Bergman and Erminio Spalla.

It was shot at the Fert Studios in Turin. The film's sets were designed by the art director Luigi Ricci.

== Synopsis ==
A former boxer, now a trainer, discovers a young fighter who he feels has all the skills to become a champion. He takes him under his wing and begins to shape him into a fully rounded fighter. However the young man's success goes to his head and he becomes involved with a rich, vapid lady without realising that his trainer's daughter is in love with him.

== Cast ==
- Enzo Fiermonte as Massimo
- Vera Bergman as Wanda Gregorovitch
- Erminio Spalla as Mario Martini
- Fiorella Betti as Bianca Martini, sua figlia
- Michele Riccardini as Federico
- Alessandra Adari
- Michele Bonaglia
- Mario Bosisio
- Luigi Garrone
- Amedeo Martini
- Bianca Martini
- Merlo Preciso
- Massimo Riccardi
- Vera Ruberti
- Mirella Scriatto
- Beniamino Serpi as Un pugile
- Vittorio Vaser

== Bibliography ==
- Roberto Chiti & Roberto Poppi. I film: Tutti i film italiani dal 1930 al 1944. Gremese Editore, 2005.
