= To Live in Peace =

1947 film

- Directed by: Luigi Zampa
- Written by: Suso Cecchi d'Amico; Aldo Fabrizi; Piero Tellini; Luigi Zampa
- Produced by: Clemente Fracassi; Carlo Ponti
- Starring: Aldo Fabrizi; John Kitzmiller; Ave Ninchi
- Cinematography: Carlo Montuori; Mario Montuori
- Edited by: Adriana Novelli
- Music by: Nino Rota
- Production company: Lux Film
- Distributed by: Lux Film
- Release date: 11 September 1947
- Running time: 90 minutes
- Country: Italy
- Language: Italian
- Box office: 126 million lira

To Live in Peace (Italian: Vivere in pace) is a 1947 Italian neorealist comedy-drama war film directed by Luigi Zampa and starring Aldo Fabrizi, John Kitzmiller and Ave Ninchi. It was shot at the Cinecittà Studios in Rome and on location around Orvieto in Umbria. The film's sets were designed by the art director Ivo Battelli.

== Cast ==
- Aldo Fabrizi as Tigna
- Gar Moore as Ronald
- Mirella Monti as Silvia
- John Kitzmiller as Joe
- Heinrich Bode as Hans
- Ave Ninchi as Corinna
- Ernesto Almirante as Il Nonno
- Nando Bruno as Il Segretario Politico
- Aldo Silvani as Il Medico
- Gino Cavalieri as Il Parroco
- Piero Palermini as Franco
- Franco Serpilli as Citto

== Awards and nominations ==
- OCIC-Prize at The World Film and Fine Arts Festival in Brussels, 1947: OCIC jury verdict : This film is amongst the films presented most able to contribute to the spiritual and moral revival of humanity. This first jury of the International Catholic Office of Cinema (OCIC) consisted out of the Jesuit Fr Charles Reinert (Switzerland), the Dominican Fr Léo Lunders O.P. (Belgium), Diego Fabbri (Italy), Luis de Zulueta (Spain), André Ruszkowski (France) and Roger Stengel (Belgium)

== Bibliography ==
- Ben-Ghiat, Ruth. Italian Fascism's Empire Cinema. Indiana University Press, 2015.
- Chiti, Roberto & Poppi, Roberto. Dizionario del cinema italiano: Dal 1945 al 1959. Gremese Editore, 1991.
- Gundle, Stephen. Fame Amid the Ruins: Italian Film Stardom in the Age of Neorealism. Berghahn Books, 2019.
