= The Wolves (1956 film) =

1956 Italian film by Giuseppe De Santis

The Wolves -Uomini e lupi-
- Directed by: Giuseppe De Santis
- Written by: Giuseppe De Santis; Tonino Guerra; Ivo Perilli; Elio Petri; Tullio Pinelli; Ugo Pirro; Gianni Puccini; Cesare Zavattini
- Starring: Silvana Mangano; Yves Montand; Guido Celano
- Cinematography: Piero Portalupi
- Edited by: Gabriele Varriale
- Music by: Mario Nascimbene
- Release date: 1956
- Running time: 102 min
- Country: Italy
- Language: Italian

The Wolves (Italian: Uomini e lupi) is a 1956 Italian neorealistic drama film directed by Giuseppe De Santis.

== Plot ==
In a small mountain village in Abruzzo, near L'Aquila, two young wolf hunters—Ricuccio and Giovanni—arrive in hopes to collect 20,000 lire prizes for every wolf they can kill. Ricuccio finds himself charmed and entranced by the beautiful commoner, Teresa. She happens to be the wife of Giovanni and the two share a young son. The hunters risk their lives daily in the snow during the wolf hunts, only making it riskier because they are in constant conflict over Ricuccio's obvious attraction to Teresa.

After Giovanni is killed by a wolf pack while insisting on trying to capture a wolf by himself in order to collect a potential 60,000 lire selling price from a zoo, Ricuccio accompanies Teresa while they attempt to collect the bounties owed to the hunters. While the two bond, Teresa nevertheless rejects Ricuccio's marriage proposal. Afterward, Ricuccio becomes amorous with the daughter of a town elder and is threatened with the prospect of forever being alienated from Teresa, who may truly love him after all.

== Cast ==
- Silvana Mangano: Teresa
- Yves Montand: Ricuccio
- Pedro Armendáriz: Giovanni
- Irene Cefaro: Bianca
- Guido Celano: Don Pietro
- Giulio Calì: Nazareno
- Euro Teodori: Amerigo
- Giovanni Matta: Pasqualino
- Maria Zanoli
- María Luisa Rolando
