= Carla Del Poggio =

Italian actress (1925–2010)

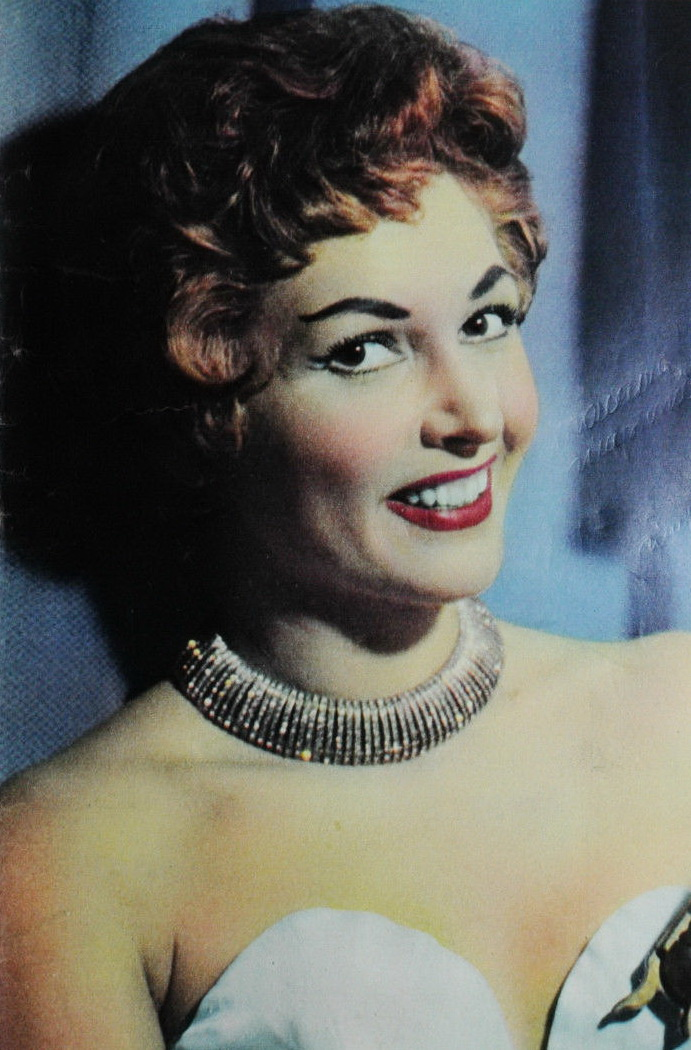
- Del Poggio in 1955
- Born: Maria Luisa Attanasio; 2 December 1925; Naples, Kingdom of Italy
- Died: 14 October 2010 (aged 84); Rome, Italy
- Occupation: Actress
- Years active: 1940–1966
- Spouse: Alberto Lattuada (m. 1945; died 2005)

Maria Luisa Attanasio (2 December 1925 – 14 October 2010), known by her stage name Carla Del Poggio, was an Italian cinema, theatre, and television actress. A native of Naples, she was the wife of Italian director Alberto Lattuada for 60 years, from 2 April 1945 until his death 3 July 2005. She died at the age of 84 from undisclosed causes.

== Filmography ==
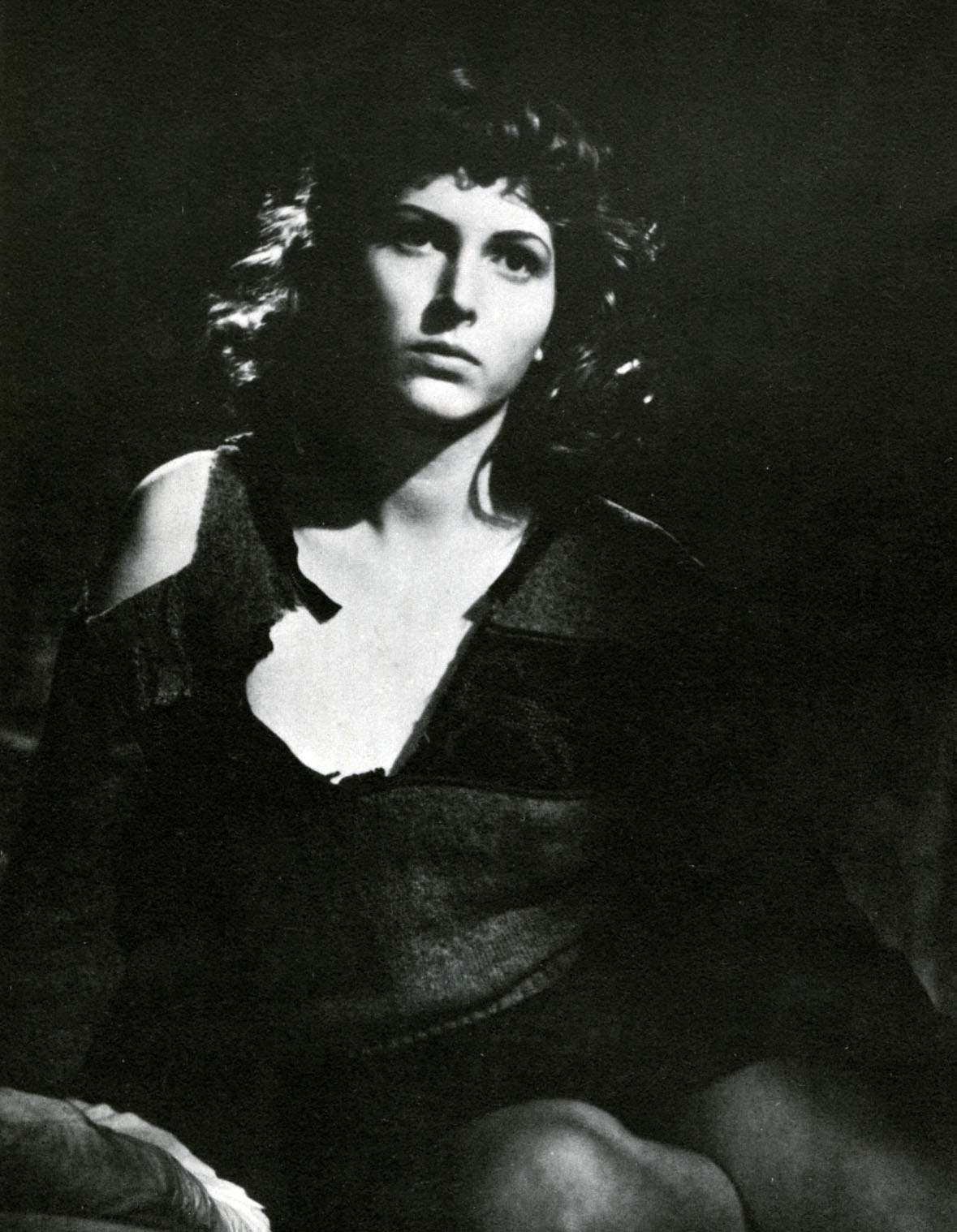
Del Poggio in Tragic Hunt (1947)

- Maddalena, Zero for Conduct, by Vittorio De Sica (1940)
- The Man on the Street, by Roberto Roberti (1941)
- La scuola dei timidi, by Carlo Ludovico Bragaglia (1941)
- A Garibaldian in the Convent, by Vittorio De Sica (1942)
- C'è sempre un ma!, by Luigi Zampa (1942)
- Violets in Their Hair, by Carlo Ludovico Bragaglia (1942)
- Incontri di notte, by Nunzio Malasomma (1943)
- Signorinette, by Luigi Zampa (1943)
- Tre ragazze cercano marito, by Duilio Coletti (1943)
- L'angelo e il diavolo, by Mario Camerini (1946)
- Umanità, by Jack Salvatori (1946)
- The Bandit, by Alberto Lattuada (1946)
- Tragic Hunt, by Giuseppe De Santis (1947)
- Lost Youth, by Pietro Germi (1947)
- Without Pity, by Alberto Lattuada (1948)
- The Mill on the Po, by Alberto Lattuada (1949)
- Cavalcade of Heroes, by Mario Costa (1950)
- Variety Lights, by Alberto Lattuada and Federico Fellini (1950)
- Red Seal, by Flavio Calzavara (1950)
- Il sentiero dell'odio, by Sergio Grieco (1951)
- The Girl from Trieste (Les Loups chassent la nuit), by Bernard Borderie (1951)
- The Ungrateful Heart, by Guido Brignone (1951)
- Wolves Hunt at Night, by Bernard Borderie (1952)
- Torment of the Past, by Mario Bonnard (1952)
- Rome 11 o'clock, by Giuseppe De Santis (1952)
- Immortal Melodies, by Giacomo Gentilomo (1952)
- Storms, by Guido Brignone (1953)
- Cose da pazzi, by Georg Wilhelm Pabst (1953)
- L'eroe della Vandea (Les Révoltés de Lomanach), by Richard Pottier (1954)
- The Secret of Helene Marimon, by Henri Calef (1954)
- The Wanderers, by Hugo Fregonese (1956)
