= Delitto al luna park =

1952 film

Crime at Luna Park
- Theatrical release poster
- Directed by: Renato Polselli
- Written by: Renato Polselli; Giovanni d'Eramo
- Produced by: Tiziano Longo
- Production company: Triestina Film
- Distributed by: Variety Distribution
- Release date: 1952
- Running time: 90 minutes
- Country: Italy
- Language: Italian

Crime at Luna Park (Italian: Delitto al luna park) is a 1952 Italian crime film directed by Renato Polselli.

== Plot ==
The singer Silvia is unwittingly involved in robberies and murders that lead to jail. Roberto believes the innocent and manages to make her release after having discovered and denounced the shady dealings in which it had fallen. Out of jail, Silvia marry Roberto.

== Cast ==
- Franca Marzi as Silvia
- Olga Gorgoni
- Renato Baldini as Roberto
- Harry Feist as Massimi
- Dante Maggio
- John Kitzmiller
- Nico Pepe
- Beatrice Mancini
