= Barrier of the Law =

1954 film

- Directed by: Piero Costa
- Written by: Guido Malatesta; Piero Costa
- Produced by: Rossano Brazzi
- Starring: Rossano Brazzi; Lea Padovani; Maria Frau
- Cinematography: Augusto Tiezzi
- Edited by: Lia Massimo
- Music by: Franco D'Achiardi
- Production company: Produzioni Rossano Brazzi
- Release date: 1954
- Running time: 81 minutes
- Country: Italy
- Language: Italian

Barrier of the Law (Italian: La barriera della legge) is a 1954 Italian thriller film directed by Piero Costa and starring Rossano Brazzi, Lea Padovani and Maria Frau. It was shot at the Fert Studios in Turin. The film's sets were designed by the art director Saverio D'Eugenio.

== Cast ==
- Rossano Brazzi as Lt. Mario Grandi
- Lea Padovani as Anna
- Maria Frau as Franca
- Jacques Sernas as Aldo
- Franca Tamantini
- Cesare Fantoni as Max Kruger
- Fedele Gentile
- Elio Armand
- Enzo Fiermonte
- Evar Maran
- Giulio Donnini
- Olga Solbelli
- Angelo Dessy
- Rossana Galli as Ilda
- Silvana Stefanini
- Giovanni Onorato
- Attilio Dottesio
- Carmelo Greco
- Corrado Nardi
- Maria Zanoli

== Bibliography ==
- Chiti, Roberto & Poppi, Roberto. Dizionario del cinema italiano: Dal 1945 al 1959. Gremese Editore, 1991.
