= Hawk of the Nile =

- Directed by: Giacomo Gentilomo
- Written by: Vittorio Nino Novarese
- Starring: Enzo Fiermonte; Silvana Pampanini; Vittorio Gassman
- Cinematography: Tino Santoni
- Edited by: Otello Colangeli
- Music by: Alessandro Cicognini; Ezio Carabella
- Release date: 1950
- Language: Italian

Hawk of the Nile (Italian: Lo sparviero del Nilo) is a 1950 Italian adventure film directed by Giacomo Gentilomo and starring Enzo Fiermonte and Silvana Pampanini.

== Plot ==
In the first half of the nineteenth century the young Leila left Paris, where she was educated, to go to Cairo to collect the inheritance of her late grandfather, a rich Egyptian pasha. Cousin Ibrahim, who administers the land properties in a dishonest manner with the complicity of his trusted Yusuf, gives the banker Micropulos the research rights in sapphire deposits located in the territory of the Beni Amer Bedouins, making them and Leila believe that they are drilling artesian wells, thus obtaining the approval of Rachid, the young sheikh of the Beni Amer. He, who went to Cairo to renew the pact that allows his people to live on the lands granted them, meets Leila and falls in love with her. Releases land administration to Ibrahim and Yusuf; these, after having commanded the delivery of the weapons, provoke the Beni Amer with the intent to drive them from their land and set them against Rachid. He, informed of the betrayal, goes to the place but is attacked by his people, believed to be the author of the general malaise. In an attempt to capture, he falls into a cliff and is believed dead. Some time later, Leila goes to the Bedouins to ascertain the situation, but a gang led by Ibrahim tries to kill her. A mysterious man, with a covered face, who calls himself Lo Sparrowhawk, runs to save her. Ibrahim, fearing to be discovered, joins Leila in the fortress where he takes refuge, forcing her to marry him in order to inherit his possessions and prevent her from accusing him of the attempted murder. Pretending to be mentally ill following the accident, Rachid is led by Yusuf to the location where the wedding is about to take place, exposed as a mockery. But just before the fateful yes, he reveals himself, he saves Leila and after a dramatic duel he kills Yusuf and Ibrahim. The two young people, finally reunited, can start a life of happiness together.

== Cast ==
- Silvana Pampanini as Leila
- Enzo Fiermonte as Rachid
- Vittorio Gassman as Yusuf
- Folco Lulli as Ibrahim
- Saro Urzì as Sahid
- Virginia Balestrieri as Selma
- Jone Morino as Madame Corinne
- Enzo Biliotti as Micropulos
- Oreste Fares as Mohammed
- Elvy Lissiak as Selika
- Samia Gamal
- Ughetto Bertucci
