= Aida (1953 film) =

1953 film by Clemente Fracassi

- Original film poster
- Directed by: Clemente Fracassi
- Written by: Clemente Fracassi; Antonio Ghislanzoni (libretto)
- Produced by: Gregor Rabinovitch; Federico Teti
- Starring: Sophia Loren; Lois Maxwell; Singing: Renata Tebaldi; Ebe Stignani; Giuseppe Campora; Gino Bechi
- Cinematography: Piero Portalupi
- Edited by: Mario Bonotti
- Music by: Giuseppe Verdi
- Distributed by: CEI Incom; I.F.E. Releasing Corporation
- Release dates: 23 October 1953 (Italy); 8 October 1954 (US)
- Running time: 95 minutes
- Country: Italy
- Language: Italian

Aida is a 1953 Italian musical melodrama film version of the opera Aida by Giuseppe Verdi. It was directed by Clemente Fracassi and produced by Gregor Rabinovitch and Federico Teti. The screenplay was adapted by Fracassi, Carlo Castelli, Anna Gobbi, and Giorgio Salviucci from the libretto by Antonio Ghislanzoni. The cinematography was by Piero Portalupi, the production design by Flavio Mogherini and the costume design by Maria De Matteis. The RAI National Symphony Orchestra was conducted by Giuseppe Morelli, the ballet was choreographed by Margherita Wallmann.

The film was screened out of competition at the 1987 Cannes Film Festival.

== Cast ==
Character	Actor	Singing-voice double
Aida	Sophia Loren	Renata Tebaldi
Amneris	Lois Maxwell	Ebe Stignani
Radamès	Luciano Della Marra	Giuseppe Campora
Amonasro	Afro Poli	Gino Bechi
Ramfis	Antonio Cassinelli	Giulio Neri

Yvette Chauviré and Léonide Massine are the dancers in the ballet with the Rome Opera Ballet.

== Production notes ==
Renata Tebaldi was originally cast to play Aida, but she decided not to appear in the film. Gina Lollobrigida was also considered for the role, before Sophia Loren was cast. Loren claimed Lollobrigida turned down the part because Lollobrigida did not want to be dubbed by Renata Tebaldi, so Sophia took the role saying "I couldn't afford to be so proud". This was Loren's first leading role and her performance was met with critical acclaim for her role as Aida.
