= Piero Portalupi =

Italian cinematographer

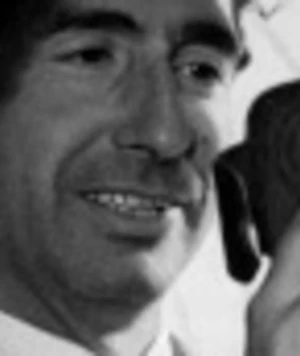
- Piero Portalupi
- Born: 19 October 1913; Arquata Scrivia, Italy
- Died: 28 June 1971 (aged 57); Genoa, Italy
- Occupation: Cinematographer
- Years active: 1940–1971 (film)

Piero Portalupi (1913–1971) was an Italian cinematographer.

== Selected filmography ==
- Luisa Sanfelice (1942)
- Fury (1947)
- The Other (1947)
- Immigrants (1948)
- I cavalieri dalle maschere nere (1948)
- Flying Squadron (1949)
- The Monastery of Santa Chiara (1949)
- Altura (1949)
- No Peace Under the Olive Tree (1950)
- Romanzo d'amore (1950)
- Tragic Spell (1951)
- Bellissima (1951)
- Vacation with a Gangster (1951)
- Aida (1953)
- Finishing School (1953)
- Neapolitan Carousel (1954)
- Andrea Chénier (1955)
- The Wolves (1956)
- A Farewell to Arms (1957)
- The Loves of Salammbo (1960)
- Carthage in Flames (1960)
- The Wastrel (1961)
- Francis of Assisi (1961)
- Jessica (1962)
- A Man Named John (1965)
- House of Cards (1968)
- The Biggest Bundle of Them All (1968)
- The Invincible Six (1970)
- Story of a Woman (1970)
- The Statue (1971)
- Romance of a Horsethief (1971)

== Bibliography ==
- Moliterno, Gino. The A to Z of Italian Cinema. Scarecrow Press, 2009.
