= Without Pity (1948 film) =

1948 film by Alberto Lattuada

- theatrical release poster
- Directed by: Alberto Lattuada
- Screenplay by: Federico Fellini; Tullio Pinelli
- Story by: Ettore Margadonna (original story); Federico Fellini; Tullio Pinelli
- Produced by: Carlo Ponti; Clemente Fracassi
- Starring: Carla Del Poggio; John Kitzmiller; Pierre Claudé; Giulietta Masina
- Cinematography: Aldo Tonti
- Edited by: Mario Bonotti
- Music by: Nino Rota
- Distributed by: Lux Film
- Release date: August 1948 (Venice Film Festival)
- Running time: 95 minutes
- Country: Italy
- Language: Italian

Without Pity (Italian: Senza pietà) is a 1948 Italian film directed by Alberto Lattuada from a script by the director himself, Federico Fellini and Tullio Pinelli, from an original story by Ettore Margadonna.

== Plot ==
Onboard a train, Angela is searching for her brother Carlo en route to Livorno. She sees a drive-by shooting and two men land onto the boxcar she is riding. A man shoots Jerry Jackson, an African-American army sergeant, and escapes. Angela calls for the train to be stopped so Jerry can receive medical treatment. Jerry successfully recovers at an army camp, while Angela is detained by U.S. army officials. She is then sent off to a convent where other female refugees are held. One night, Angela holds a nun at gunpoint and most of the women escape.

Angela and Marcella run off and arrive at Giacomo's apartment. The next morning, Pier Luigi arrives on the docks where he plans to smuggle U.S. military supplies onto the black market. His men had bribed Jerry into serving as an intermediary but he steadily refused their offer. Jerry reunites with Angela, and thanks her for saving his life. Angela asks Pier Luigi about Carlo's recent whereabouts, but he has not seen Carlo. Jerry departs moments later, but promises to return for her.

Later that night, Jerry returns to see Angela, and she accompanies him to an amusement park. They arrive at a café where a man, Baron Hoffman, overhears their conversation and gives them a palm reading. Hoffman finds their hands are alike. They leave the café and accept a ride from Pier Luigi. He tells Jerry he can't continue to support Angela, and suggest she may fall into prostitution. Jerry makes a deal to transport the goods to Pier Luigi's men the next morning, and he is promptly arrested.

Angela learns of Jerry's arrest, and meets Pier Luigi at the docks, where he informs her that Carlo is dead. Angela throws herself into a river and is bedridden with a fever under Marcella's care. She recovers and she is driven with several others to a nightclub. Determined to reunite with Angela, Jerry plans to escape from the prison camp, with his Army friend Richard. Jerry escapes, but Richard is shot dead. At the nightclub, Angela pleads with Pier Luigi to help one of her friends, Dina, who was left behind en route to the nightclub. Outside the nightclub, Dina is struck dead when she is run over by a transport truck.

Angela returns to Pier Luigi's apartment where she sees Jerry. The next morning, Marcella has arranged a pathway to immigrate into the United States, and sails away at a beach. Angela reunites with Jerry at the beach where she desperately wants to run away with him. They hear nearby gunfire and Jerry runs away to hide. Angela goes back to Pier Luigi for assistance, but he declines. She also overhears Pier Luigi is meeting with a captain to smuggle goods worth 4 million lira tomorrow night. Angela meets with Jerry, hiding at a police station, and they arrange to finance their escape.

Jerry holds Pier Luigi and Giacomo at gunpoint, and takes their transport truck so he can obtain the money. Meanwhile, Angela prays at a cathedral where Jerry arrives with the money. They step outside where they are held at gunpoint by one of Pier Luigi's men. Angela is shot from afar, and Pier Luigi repossesses the money. Jerry cradles her body onto the truck promising never to leave her. As he drives off, Jerry drives over the cliff where military police inspect the accident.

== Cast ==
- Carla Del Poggio as Angela
- John Kitzmiller as Jerry
- Pierre Claudé as Pier Luigi
- Giulietta Masina as Marcella
- Folco Lulli as Giacomo
- Lando Muzio as South American Captain

== Reception ==
Without Pity was banned in the United States and British occupation zones in Germany, but was a success at the box-office in Italy.
