= Barefoot Savage =

1952 film

- Directed by: Clemente Fracassi
- Written by: Ennio De Concini; Clemente Fracassi; Alberto Moravia
- Starring: Angelo Binarelli
- Cinematography: Aldo Tonti
- Edited by: Mario Bonotti
- Release date: 28 June 1952
- Running time: 93 minutes
- Country: Italy
- Language: Italian

Barefoot Savage (Italian: Sensualità) is a 1952 Italian melodrama film directed by Clemente Fracassi.

== Cast ==
- Angelo Binarelli as Marco
- Clorindo Cerato as Farm Hand
- Francesca Liddi as Nidia
- Marcello Mastroianni as Carlo Sartori
- Corrado Nardi as Bosci
- Amedeo Nazzari as Riccardo Sartori
- Eleonora Rossi Drago as Franca Gabrie
- Maria Zanoli as Maid
