= Romanticismo (film) =

1949 film

- Directed by: Clemente Fracassi
- Release date: March 1951
- Country: Italy
- Language: Italian

Romanticismo is a 1951 Italian historical melodrama film directed by Clemente Fracassi.The film is set in Milan in 1858 and involves a Dr. Antonio Ansperti from Como, implicated in the activities of the Young Italy revolutionary movement.

== Cast ==
- Clara Calamai as Giuditta Ansperti
- Nyta Dover as Mrs. Dollman
- Harry Feist as Varzis, officer
- Fulvia Franco as Mrs. Pochini
- Olga Vittoria Gentilli as Countess Lamberti
- Fosco Giachetti as Tito Ansperti
- Enrico Glori as Baraffini
- Tamara Lees as Anna
- Paul Muller
- Amedeo Nazzari as Vitaliano Lamberti
- Filippo Scelzo as General Rienz
