= Maria Zanoli =

Italian actress (1896–1977)

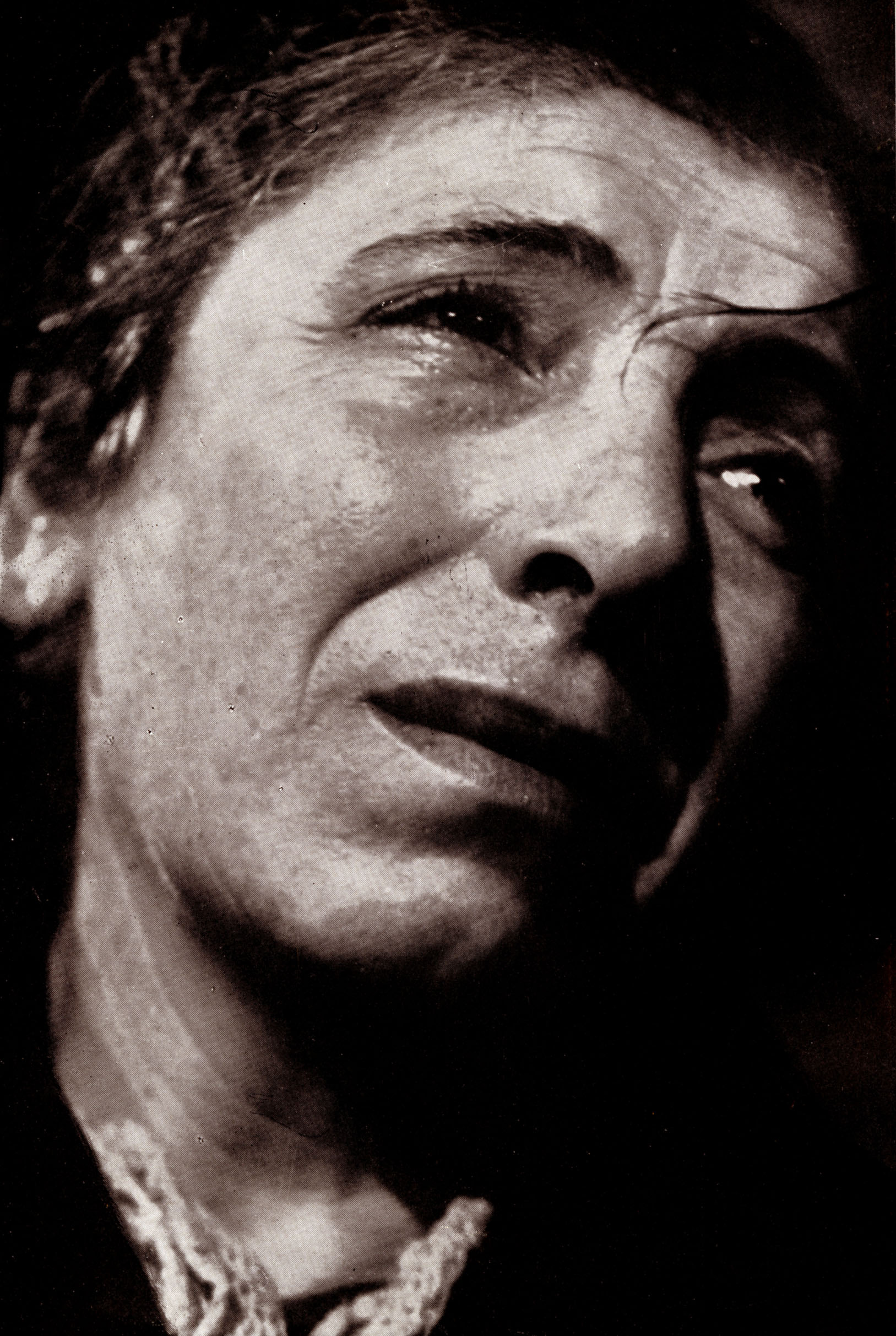
- Born: 26 October 1896; Milan, Kingdom of Italy
- Died: 15 November 1977 (aged 81); Milan, Italy
- Occupation: Actress
- Years active: 1943–1961

Maria Zanoli (26 October 1896 – 15 November 1977) was an Italian film actress. She appeared in 45 films between 1943 and 1961.

== Partial filmography ==
- Loyalty of Love (1934) – La cameriera pettegola di casa Confalonieri
- Incontri di notte (1943)
- Zazà (1944)
- Macario contro Zagomar (1944)
- Circo equestre Za-bum (1944) – (segment "Galop finale al circo")
- Giudicatemi! (1948)
- Il sentiero dell'odio (1950)
- Il nido di Falasco (1950)
- Tragic Spell (1951) – Witch
- Quo Vadis (1951) – Minor Role (uncredited)
- Amo un assassino (1951)
- Barefoot Savage (1952) – Cameriera
- Europa '51 (1952) – Mrs. Galli
- Deceit (1952) – La padrona della pensione
- Girls Marked Danger (1952) – Fossati's Wife
- Il romanzo della mia vita (1952) – Maddalena Tuttafuoco's Mother (uncredited)
- Non ho paura di vivere (1952)
- Non è vero... ma ci credo (1952) - Party Guest (uncredited)
- Carne inquieta (1952) - Angela Ferrara
- Bufere (1953) - (uncredited)
- Noi peccatori (1953) - Un' altra guardiana del carcere (uncredited)
- Too Young for Love (1953)
- Fermi tutti... arrivo io! (1953) - Signora con cagnolino
- La lupa (1953)
- Angels of Darkness (1954)
- Processo contro ignoti (1954)
- Before the Deluge (1954) - Madame Dutoit
- Appassionatamente (1954) - Maria
- The Barefoot Contessa (1954) - Maria Vargas' Mother
- Barrier of the Law (1954)
- Love Song (1954)
- Farewell, My Beautiful Lady (1954) - La governante
- Le signorine dello 04 (1954) - Aunt Clementina
- Spring, Autumn and Love (1955) - Anais
- Black Dossier (1955) - Marthe
- Il bidone (1955) - Stella Florina
- L'ultimo amante (1955) - Il medico di guardi
- Andrea Chenier (1955) - Governante in casa Chénier
- Helen of Troy (1956) - Minor Role (uncredited)
- Incatenata dal destino (1956) - Cameriera di Stella
- War and Peace (1956) - Mavra - Rostov Housekeeper (uncredited)
- La capinera del mulino (1956) - La Gnaffa
- The Wolves (1956) - (uncredited)
- Le Notti Bianche (1957) - La domestica
- An Eye for an Eye (1957)
- El Alamein (1957) - (uncredited)
- Vengeance (1958) - Madre
- Love and Troubles (1961) - Madre di Liliana
- Barabbas (1961) - Beggar Woman
- Scano Boa (1961)
