= Mario Bonotti =

Italian film editor

- Occupation: Editor
- Years active: 1933–1968

Mario Bonotti was an Italian film editor. While much of his work was in popular genre cinema, he also edited several post-war neorealist films such as The Bandit (1946) and Without Pity (1948). He had an acting role in the 1953 film Love in the City.

== Selected filmography ==
- Black Shirt (1933)
- Two Million for a Smile (1939)
- Maddalena, Zero for Conduct (1940)
- Bridge of Glass (1940)
- The Cavalier from Kruja (1940)
- Saint Rogelia (1940)
- The Sin of Rogelia Sanchez (1940)
- Teresa Venerdì (1941)
- Forbidden Music (1942)
- The Little Teacher (1942)
- A Garibaldian in the Convent (1942)
- Giacomo the Idealist (1943)
- The Children Are Watching Us (1944)
- The Gates of Heaven (1945)
- The Bandit (1946)
- Without Pity (1948)
- Escape to France (1948)
- Variety Lights (1950)
- The Passaguai Family (1951)
- Beauties in Capri (1952)
- Toto in Color (1952)
- Barefoot Savage (1952)
- Aida (1953)
- Love in the City (1953)
- If You Won a Hundred Million (1953)
- Tripoli, Beautiful Land of Love (1954)
- The Captive City (1962)

== Bibliography ==
- Mauricio Ponzi. The films of Gina Lollobrigida. Citadel Press, 1982.
