= Romanzo d'amore =

1950 film

- Directed by: Duilio Coletti
- Cinematography: Piero Portalupi
- Release date: 1950
- Country: Italy
- Language: Italian

Romanzo d'amore is a 1950 Italian historical melodrama film directed by Duilio Coletti.

== Cast ==
- Rossano Brazzi as Enrico Toselli
- Danielle Darrieux as Archduchess Louise of Austria
- Olinto Cristina
- Jone Morino
- Vira Silenti
- Elena Altieri
- Liana Del Balzo
