= Clemente Fracassi =

Italian film producer

- Born: 5 March 1917; Vescovato, Italy
- Died: 2 February 1993 (aged 75); Rome, Italy
- Occupations: Film producer Film director Screenwriter
- Years active: 1939–1967

Clemente Fracassi (5 March 1917 – 2 February 1993) was an Italian film producer, director and screenwriter. His career spanned from 1939 to 1967.

Born in Vescovato, Cremona, Fracassi started his career in the late 1930s, as assistant director of Mario Camerini and Mario Soldati and shortly later as producer. He made his directorial debut as a Soldati's last-minute replacement with Romanticismo.

== Selected filmography ==
As a producer

- Professor, My Son (1946)
- To Live in Peace (1947)
- Les Misérables (1948)
- Without Pity (1948)
- The Mill on the Po (1949)
- Toto Looks for a House (1949)
- A Dog's Life (1950)
- Susanna Whipped Cream (1957)
- Juliet of the Spirits (1965)
- Death on the Run (1967)

As a director

- Romanticismo (1950)
- Barefoot Savage (1952, also writer)
- Aida (1953)
- Andrea Chénier (1955)
