= Alberto Lattuada =

Italian film director

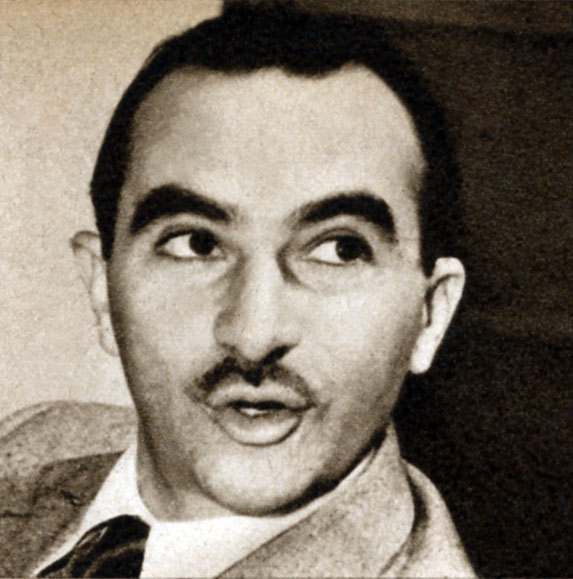
- Lattuada in 1951
- Born: 13 November 1914; Vaprio d'Adda, Kingdom of Italy
- Died: 3 July 2005 (aged 90); Rome, Italy
- Spouse: Carla Del Poggio (m. 1945)

Mario Alberto Lattuada (Italian pronunciation: [alˈbɛrto lattuˈaːda, - latˈtwaːda]; 13 November 1914 – 3 July 2005) was an Italian film director.

== Career ==
Lattuada was born in Vaprio d'Adda, the son of composer Felice Lattuada. He was initially interested in literature, becoming, while still a student, a member of the editorial staff of the antifascist fortnightly Camminare... (1932) and part of the artists' group Corrente di Vita (1938).

Before entering the film industry, Lattuada's father made him complete his studies as an architect even though he recognized his desire to make movies. He began his film career as a screenwriter and assistant director on Mario Soldati's Piccolo mondo antico ("Old-Fashioned World", 1940). The first film he directed was Giacomo l'idealista (1943). Variety Lights (1950), co-directed with Federico Fellini, was the latter's first directorial endeavour. Lattuada's film The Steppe (1962) was entered into the 12th Berlin International Film Festival. In 1970, he was a member of the jury at the 20th Berlin International Film Festival. New Line Cinema released his erotic film Stay As You Are theatrically in the United States in 1979.

He was married to actress Carla Del Poggio. He died at 90 years old of Alzheimer's disease. He was buried in his family's chapel in the cemetery of Morimondo.

== Filmography (as director) ==
Year	Title	Genre	Notes
1940s
1942	Yes, Madam	Romance	First feature film
1943	Giacomo the Idealist	Drama	
1943	La freccia nel fianco		Finished by Mario Costa in 1944
1945	La nostra guerra	Documentary	
1946	The Bandit	Drama	
1947	Flesh Will Surrender	Drama	
1948	Without Pity	Drama	
1949	The Mill on the Po	Drama	
1950s
1950	Variety Lights	Romance	Co-directed with Federico Fellini
1951	Anna	Melodrama	
1952	The Overcoat	Drama	
1953	La lupa	Drama	
1953	Love in the City	Anthology	Segment: Gli italiani si voltano
1954	The Beach	Dramedy	
1955	Scuola elementare		
1957	Guendalina	Comedy	
1958	Tempest	Drama	
1960s
1960	Sweet Deceptions	Drama	
1960	Lettere di una novizia	Drama	
1961	The Mishap	Crime	
1962	Mafioso	Dark comedy	
1962	The Steppe	Adventure	
1965	The Mandrake	Comedy	
1967	Don Juan in Sicily	Dramedy	
1967	Matchless	Science fiction	
1968	Fräulein Doktor	Spy	
1969	L'amica		
1970s
1970	Come Have Coffee with Us	Comedy	
1972	White Sister	Comedy	
1973	Sono stato io	Dramedy	
1974	I'll Take Her Like a Father	Comedy	
1976	Dog's Heart	Comedy	
1976	Oh! Serafina	Dramedy	
1978	Stay As You Are	Drama	
1980s
1980	The Cricket	Drama	
1981	Portrait of a Woman, Nude	Mystery	Replaced by Nino Manfredi
1986	A Thorn in the Heart	Drama	
1989	Mano rubata	Television film	Last feature film
