= Arnoldo Foà =

Italian actor (1916–2014)

Arnoldo Foà OMRI
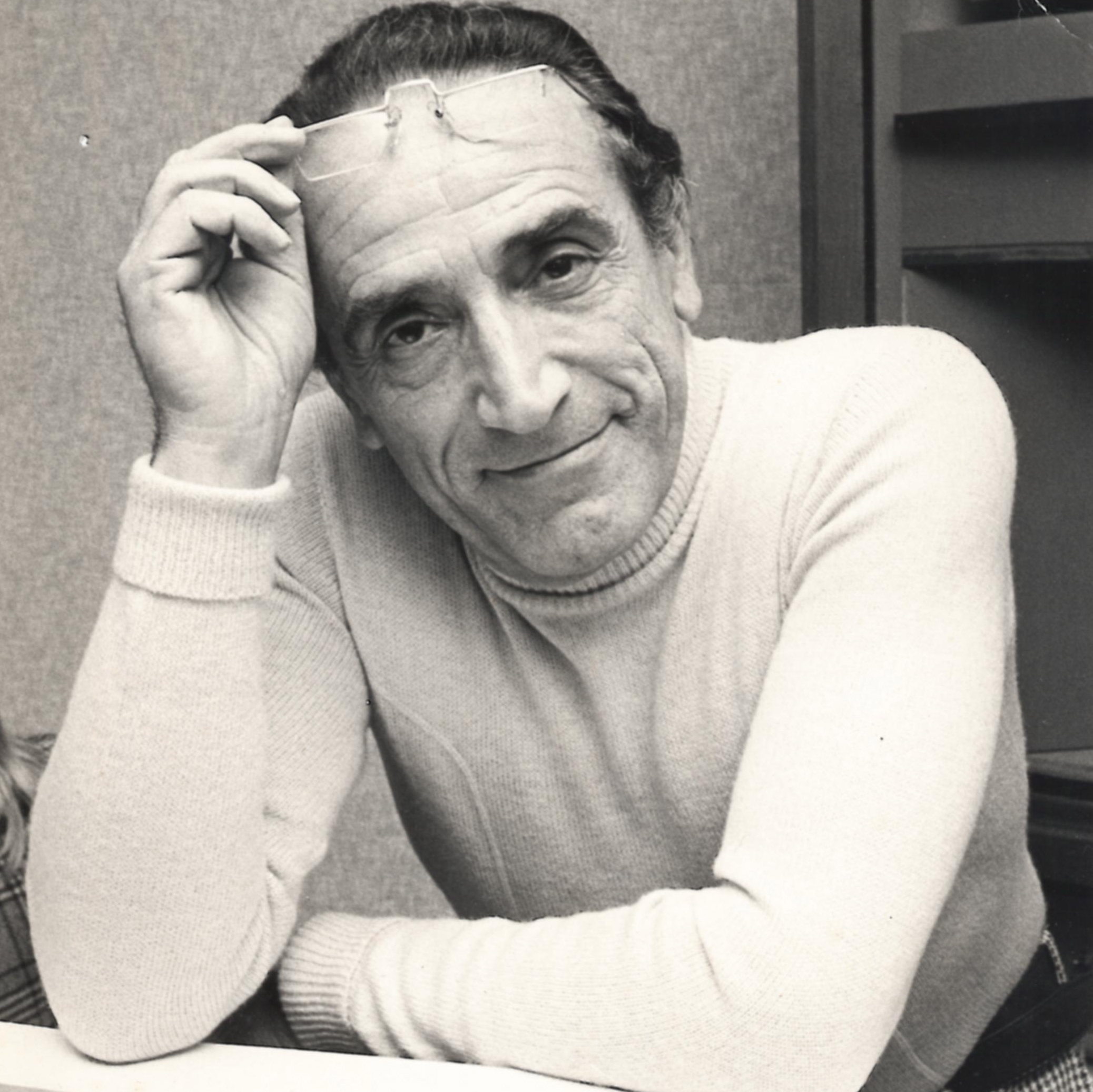
- Foà in the 1950s
- Born: Arnoldo Eugenio Foà; 24 January 1916; Ferrara, Kingdom of Italy
- Died: 11 January 2014 (aged 97); Rome, Italy
- Occupations: Actor; director; voice actor; singer; writer
- Years active: 1935–2014

Arnoldo Foà (24 January 1916 – 11 January 2014) was an Italian actor, voice actor, theatre director, singer and writer. He appeared in more than 130 films between 1938 and 2014.

== Biography ==
Foà was born in Ferrara, Italy, to a Jewish family, though Foà was an atheist in his adult life. Foà completed high school in Florence, where he moved with his family, and studied at the acting school of Rasi. He abandoned his studies in economics and at age 20 moved to Rome, where he attended the Centro Sperimentale di Cinematografia.

He was initiated to the Italian Scottish Rite Freemasonry in 1947 at the lodge "Alpi Giulie" n.150 (in Rome), taking later the highest degree.

Foà died on 11 January 2014 from respiratory failure, just 13 days short of his 98th birthday.

== Theatre ==
=== 1930s ===
- La serenata al vento by Carlo Veneziani, directed by Alberto Bracaloni, 1935
- La dodicesima notte by William Shakespeare, directed by Pietro Sharoff, 1938
- L’Alcalde di Zalamea by Calderón de la Barca, directed by Raffaello Melani
- Rappresentazione di Santo Ignazio (Anonimo del XV secolo), directed by G. Pacuvio, 1939
- Frenesia by Charles de Peyret-Chappuis, directed by Edoardo Anton
- La vita è sogno by Calderon de la Barca, directed by Nino Meloni
- Le Allegre Comari di Windsor by William Shakespeare, directed by Pietro Scharoff

=== 1940s ===
- I Masnadieri by Friedrich Schiller, directed by Guido Salvini, 1941
- I Fratelli Castiglioni by Alberto Colantuoni, directed by Cesare Meano, 1942
- L’Arco di Ulisse by Gerhart Hauptmann
- La Nascita di Salomè, directed by Cesare Meano
- La ragazza indiavolata by Ralph Benatzky, Teatro Quirino, 1943
- La Parte di Marito by Vincenzo Tieri
- La Vedova Allegra, by Franz Lehár
- Il Marchese di Priolà by Henry Lavedan
- Non Rinuncio all’Amore by Giovanni Bokay
- Papà by Gaston Arman De Caillavet and Robert De Flers
- Piccoli Traguardi by Giovanni Mosca
- La brava gente by Irwin Shaw, directed by Jean Giraudoux, Teatro Eliseo, 1945
- La luna è tramontata by John Steinbeck, directed by Vito Pandolfi, (Teatro Quirino di Roma, 15 febbraio)
- Arsenico e vecchi merletti by Joseph Kesselring, directed by Ettore Giannini
- La bella avventura by Caillavet e De Flers, directed by Ettore Giannini
- Parenti Terribili by Jean Cocteau, directed by Luchino Visconti, Compagnia del Teatro Eliseo
- Enrico IV by Luigi Pirandello
- La quinta colonna by Ernest Hemingway, directed by Luchino Visconti, Compagnia del Teatro Eliseo di Roma
- La via del tabacco Jack Kirkland (from novel of Erskine Caldwell), directed by Luchino Visconti, Teatro Quirino of Roma 16 April 1946
- Mia sorella Evelina by J. Fields e J. Chodorov, directed by Guido Salvini
- Susanna e i peccatori directed by Tullio Carminati
- Delitto e castigo by Gaston Baty (Fyodor Dostoyevsky), directed by Luchino Visconti
- La Madre degli emigranti by Turi Vasile and Alberto Perrini, directed by Nino Meloni, Basilica of Maxentius, 6 luglio
- Il Ritratto di Dorian Gray by Oscar Wilde, directed by Guido Salvini, Teatro Quirino
- Incantesimo by Philip Barry, directed by Gerardo Guerrieri, Teatro delle Arti, Rome, 7 febbraio
- Appuntamento a Senlis by Jean Anouilh, directed by Guido Salvini, 1947
- Candida by George Bernard Shaw, directed by Alessandro Brissoni, (Compagnia Ferrati-Cortese-Scelso)
- La fine della Signora Cheiney by Frederick Lonsdale
- Fiera delle maschere (from Ruzante e Molière), version by Vito Pandolfi and Luigi Squarzina, directed by Luigi Squarzina
- Sposateci, Signore...! by Jean de Létraz, directed by Alessandro Brissoni
- L’Uomo e il Fucile by Sergio Sollima, directed by Luigi Squarzina, Praga
- Anfitrione 38 by Jean Giradoux, directed by Alessandro Brissoni, Teatro Quirino, 23 dicembre
- Cristo ha ucciso by Gian Paolo Callegari, directed by Guido Salvini, Compagnia Straordinaria di G. Salvini, Teatro La Fenice di Venezia, 1948
- Una bella domenica di settembre by Ugo Betti, directed by Turi Vasile, Teatro Quirino di Roma
- Edipo Re di Eschilo, directed by Guido Salvini, Comp. Straordinaria di G. Salvini, Teatro Olimpico di Vicenza
- La porta chiusa by Marco Praga, directed by Alessandro Brissoni, Teatro Quirino
- Scendete..vi chiamano by Jean De Letraz, directed by Alessandro Brissoni
- I due mondi by Rose Franken, directed by Alessandro Brissoni, compagnia Ferrati-Scelzo-Cortese-Marchiò
- Stefano by Jacques Déval, directed by Enzo Ferrieri
- Il regno animale by Philip Barry, directed by Luigi Squarzina
- La notte del 16 gennaio by Ayn Rand, directed by Guglielmo Cortese, Ente Teatrale Italiano, Teatro Quirino
- Ardelia o La Margherita by Jean Anouilh, directed by Alessandro Brissoni, Compagnia Cortese-Bagni-Cimara, Teatro Valle di Roma, 25 marzo 1949
- Giulio Cesare by William Shakespeare, directed by Guido Salvini, Compagnia del Festival Drammatico, Teatro Romano di Verona
- Medea di Euripides, directed by Guido Salvini, Istituto Nazionale del Dramma Antico, Teatro Olimpico di Vicenza
- Le Mani Sporche by Jean-Paul Sartre, directed by Alessandro Brissoni
- L’Avaro by Molière, directed by Luciano Salvi, Teatro Ateneo
- Vivere Così by Dino Falconi
- Proibito al Pubblico by Rogers Dornès and Jean Marsan, directed by Alessandro Brissoni
- I Masnadieri by Friedrich Schiller, directed by Guido Salvini

=== 1950s ===
- I Persiani by Eschilo directed by Luigi Squarzina, Istituto Nazionale del Dramma Antico, Greek Theatre of Syracuse, 12 maggio 1950
- Le Baccanti by Euripides, directed by Luigi Squarzina, Istituto Nazionale del Dramma Antico, Greek Theatre of Syracuse
- Peer Gynt by Henrik Ibsen, directed by Vittorio Gassman, Compagnia del Teatro nazionale, Teatro Valle di Roma
- Sophonisba by Giangiorgio Trissino, directed by Giorgio Strehler, Teatro Olimpico di Vicenza
- Antigone by Sophocles, directed by Guido Salvini, Teatro Olimpico di Vicenza
- Commedia degli Straccioni by Annibal Caro, directed by Guido Salvini, Compagnia Teatro Nazionale
- Caterina da Siena by Cesare Vico Ludovici, directed by Fernando De Crucciati
- I Fratelli by Publius Terentius Afer, directed by Luigi Squarzina, Teatro Greco di Acrae
- La Cameriera Brillante by Carlo Goldoni, directed by Lucio Chiavarelli
- Anna per mille giorni by Maxwell Anderson, directed by Guido Salvini, Teatro Valle, 1951
- Detective story, by Sidney Kingsley, directed by Luigi Squarzina, Compagnia del Teatro Nazionale
- Il libro di Cristoforo Colombo by Paul Claudel, directed by Guido Salvini
- Giulietta e Romeo by William Shakespeare, directed by Guido Salvini, Teatro Valle
- La Casa Nova by Carlo Goldoni, directed by Carlo Lodovici, Teatro di Palazzo Grassi (Venezia)
- Yo, el Rey by Bruno Cicognani, directed by Guido Salvini
- Un mese in campagna by Ivan Turgenev, directed by Orazio Costa, Teatro Odeon di Milano, 1952
- Le Nuvole by Sophocles, directed by Giulio Pacuvio, Istituto Nazionale del Dramma Antico
- Pseudolus by Plautus, directed by Giulio Pacuvio, Istituto Nazionale del Dramma Antico
- Lazzaro by Luigi Pirandello, directed by Claudio Fino, Compagnia Pagnani
- La Fiaccola sotto il moggio by Gabriele D'Annunzio, directed by Corrado Pavolini
- Capitan Carvallo by Denis Cannan, directed by Mario Ferrero, Compagnia Italiana di Prosa, Teatro Carignano
- Chéri by Léopold Marchand (of Colette), directed by André Barsacq, Compagnia Italiana di Prosa, Teatro Duse
- Giulio Cesare by William Shakespeare, directed by Giorgio Strelher, Compagnia del Piccolo Teatro della Città di Milano, Piccolo Teatro di Milano, 1953
- Amphitryon by Plautus, directed by Jean Giraudoux, comp. Teatro Eliseo of Roma, Palazzo dei Diamanti a Ferrara, 1955
- Pseudolus by Plautus, directed by Giulio Pacuvio, Compagnia del Dramma Antico, Teatro Romano di Ostia
- Le Nuvole by Aristofanes, directed by Giulio Pacuvio, Compagnia del Dramma Antico, Teatro Romano di Ostia
- Veglia d’armi by D. Fabbri, directed by Orazio Costa, Istituto Dramma Popolare, Teatro Olimpia di Milano, 1956
- Paura di me by V. Bompiani, directed by Daniele D’Anza, Comp. Teatrale Italiana Teatro delle Arti
- Noi due by Alessandro De Stefani, directed by Mario Landi, Compagnia Teatrale Italiana, Teatro delle Arti of Roma
- La professione della signora Warren by George Bernard Shaw, directed by Mario Ferrero, Compagnia Pagnani-Villi-Foà, Teatro Eliseo of Roma
- Adorabile Giulia of Marc Gilbert Sauvajon, directed by Daniele D'Anza, Compagnia Pagnani-Villi-Foà-Ferzetti, Teatro Eliseo of Roma
- Musica di foglie morte by Pier Maria Rosso di San Secondo, directed by Alberto Gagliardelli
- Casa di Bambola by Henrik Ibsen, directed by Luciano Lucignani
- Ma non è una cosa seria by Luigi Pirandello, directed by Luigi Squarzina, comp. Pagnani-Villi-Foà-Ferzetti, 1957
- Signori buonasera by A. Foà, directed by A. Foà, Compagnia Pagnani-Villi-Foà-Ferzetti, Teatro Odeon di Milano
- La figlia di Jorio by Gabriele D'Annunzio, directed by Luigi Squarzina
- La Commedia degli Equivoci by W. Shakespeare, directed by Mario Ferrero, 1958
- Racconto d’Inverno by William Shakespeare, directed by Guido Salvini, 1959
- Commedia degli Straccioni by Annibal Caro, directed by Guido Salvini
- Miles gloriusus by Plautus, directed by Giulio Pacuvio

=== 1960s ===
- Due in altalena by William Gibson, directed by A. Foà, Teatro Eliseo di Roma, 1960
- La terra è rotonda by Armand Salacrou, directed by Roberto Guicciardini
- Giulietta e Romeo by W. Shakespeare, directed by Franco Enriquez, Teatro Romano di Verona
- Rashomon di Fay e Kanin, (dal film di Akira Kurosawa), directed by Arnoldo Foà, 1961
- I Turchi se la giocano a primiera by Alfio Beretta, directed by Arnoldo Foà, Teatro Nuovo di Milano
- Pene d’amor perdute by William Shakespeare, directed by Franco Enriquez, Compagnia Stabile della città di Napoli, Teatro Mercadante
- Un giorno nella vita di ... by Jack Popplewell, directed by Umberto Benedetto, Piccolo Teatro Stabile della città di Firenze
- Anfitrione by Plautus, directed by Silverio Blasi, Centro Teatrale Italiano, 1962
- Ifigenia by Ildebrando Pizzetti e Alberto Perrini, directed by Aldo Vassallo Mirabella, Teatro dell’Opera di Roma
- Il Pipistrello by Johann Strauss Jr, directed by Herbert Graf, Direttore d’orchestra Samuel Krachmalnick, regia teatrale Arnoldo Foà, Teatro dell’Opera di Roma
- I Masteroidi by Marcel Aymè, directed by A. Foà, 1963
- Notti a Milano by Carlo Terron, directed by A. Foà
- La Lanzichenecca by Vincenzo di Mattia, directed by Virginio Puecher, Compagnia del Piccolo Teatro di Milano, 1964
- Eracle by Euripide, translated by Salvatore Quasimodo, directed by Giuseppe Di Martino, Istituto Nazionale del Dramma Antico, Teatro Greco di Siracusa
- Andromaca by Euripide, directed by Mario Ferrero, Istituto Nazionale del Dramma Antico, Teatro Greco di Siracusa
- Canti e poesie della libertà, directed by Raffaele Maiello, testi a cura di Arnoldo Foà e Gigi Lunari, Teatro Lirico di Milano, 1965
- Re Cervo da Carlo Gozzi, directed by Andrea Camilleri
- Ruy Blas by Victor Hugo, directed by Mario Ferrero, Teatro Duse di Bologna, 1966
- Il testimone by A. Foà, directed by Arnoldo Foà, Teatro Duse di Bologna
- La stanza degli Ospiti by Brunello Rondi, directed by A. Foà, Teatro della Cometa
- I Menecmi by Plauto, translated by Ettore Paratore, directed by Accursio Di Leo, Istituto Nazionale del Dramma Antico
- La Pace by Aristofane, directed by A. Foà, Istituto Nazionale del Dramma Antico, 1967
- Zio Vania by Anton Checov, directed by Pietro Sharoff, Teatro Centrale di Roma, 1968
- Golem by Alessandro Fersen, directed by A. Fersen, E.T.I. Teatro La Pergola di Firenze, 1969
- Malatesta by Henry de Montherlant, translated by Mario Moretti, directed by José Quaglio

=== 1970s ===
- Il Burbero Benefico by Carlo Goldoni, directed by Carlo Lodovici, ripresa televisiva 22 dicembre 1970
- Diana e la Tuda by L. Pirandello, directed by Arnoldo Foà, Teatro Stabile di Palermo, 1971
- Flavia e le sue Bambole by Salvato Cappelli, directed by Giorgio Prosperi, Fondazione Andrea Biondo Compagnia Stabile di Palermo
- The entertainer by John Osborne, directed by Arnoldo Foà, Compagnia Teatro San Babila di Milano, 1972
- Per una giovinetta che nessuno piange by Renato Mainardi, directed by Arnoldo Foà
- Lisistrata by Aristofane, directed by Daniele D’Anza, Istituto Nazionale del Dramma Antico, Teatro Greco di Siracusa
- Vecchi vuoti a rendere by Maurizio Costanzo, directed by Arnoldo Foà, Teatro Valle 1973
- Miles Gloriosus by Plauto, trad. e ridu. di A. Foà, directed by A. Foà, Compagnia Attori Riuniti
- L’estro del Poeta by Eugene O’Neill, directed by Enrico Colosimo
- La folle Amanda by Pierre Barillet e Jean-Pierre Gredy, directed by Arnoldo Foà, Compagnia del Teatro Comico, Teatro Duse di Bologna, 1974
- Maschere Nude by L. Pirandello, directed by Lambreto Puggelli, Compagnia del Teatro San Babila, 1975
- Farsa d’amore e di gelosia by Mario Amendola e Bruno Corbucci, directed by Filippo Crivelli, Teatro Nuovo di Milano 1976
- Un angelo calibro 9 by Nino Marino, directed by A. Foà, Theatritalia/Compagnia del Momento Teatrale, Teatro Duse di Bologna, 1977–1978
- La Roba da G. Verga, directed by A. Mazzone
- Quella della porta accanto by Nino Marino, directed by A. Foà
- Diana e la Tuda by L. Pirandello, directed by Arnoldo Foà, con A. Foà, Teatro Parioli di Roma, 1979

=== 1980s ===
- Il lebbroso by Giancarlo Menotti, directed by Giancarlo Menotti, Festival dei Due Mondi, 1980
- Il teatro comico by Carlo Goldoni, directed by Augusto Zucchi
- Questa sera si recita a soggetto by Luigi Pirandello, regia di Marco Parodi, Cooperativa Teatro di Sardegna, 1982
- Le Supplici by Eschilo, regia Otomar Krejca, Greek Theatre of Syracuse
- L’Angelo Azzurro, adapted by Aldo Trionfo e Alessandro Giupponi dal testo di Heinrich Mann, directed by Alessandro Giupponi, 1983
- Il Settimo Sigillo (da Dipinto su legno by Ingmar Bergman), directed by Lucio Chiavarelli, Festival di Borgio Verezzi, 1984
- Diana e la Tuda by Luigi Pirandello, directed by A. Foà
- Ciavieddu by Salvatore Fiume, directed by Melo Freni, Teatro dei Ruderi di Gibellina, 1985
- La corda a tre capi by A. Foà, directed by Arnoldo Foà, Astec - Teatro Stabile dei Giovani
- Fiorenza by Thomas Mann, directed by Aldo Trionfo (con la collaborazione di Lorenzo Salveti), 1986
- Otello by Giuseppe Verdi (opera lirica), directed by Arnoldo Foà, Auditorium di Cagliari
- La Tosca by Victorien Sardou, adattamento e directed by Aldo Trionfo, Teatro Cilea di Napoli, 1988
- L’ispettore generale by Nikolai Gogol, directed by Roberto Guicciardini, GITIESSE Spettacoli, 1989
- La palla al piede by Georges Feydeau, directed by Armando Pugliese, Teatro Quirino di Roma
- Un pezzo di paradiso by Steve J. Spears, directed by A. Foà, Taormina Arte

=== 1990s ===
- Don Giovanni e Faust by Christian Dietrich Grabbe, directed by Gino Zampieri, Festival del Teatro Classico, Borgio Verezzi, 1990
- L’Ultimo Viaggio di Pirandello by B. Belfiore, directed by P. Gazzara, 1991
- Adelchi by A. Manzoni, directed by Federico Tiezzi, produzione Teatro Biondo di Palermo e Teatro Argentina di Roma, Teatro Biondo di Palermo, 1992
- La bottega del caffè by C. Goldoni, directed by Mario Missiroli, Produzione Teatro Argentina di Roma
- La Pace by Aristofane, trad. di Raffaele Cantarella, adattamento e directed by A. Foà, Teatro Olimpico di Vicenza
- Il Corsaro (dal Decamerone di Boccaccio) di Fausto Tapergi, directed by Marco Carniti, 1993–1994
- Aulularia by Plauto, directed by Renato Giordano, Teatro Romano di Ostia Antica
- Aminta by Torquato Tasso, directed by Luca Ronconi, Produzione Teatro di Roma
- Una serata per l'impresario teatrale directed by Stefano Mazzonis, Trittico di 3 opere buffe: Il maestro di cappella by D.Cimarosa e Epitaffi sparsi by Ennio Morricone, e L'impresario teatrale by W. A. Mozart. Orchestra Pro Arte Marche diretta da Bruno Rigacci. 1997
- La signora della musica by André Ernotte e Elliot Tiber, adattamento e directed by A. Foà, Cantiere Internazionale d’Arte di Montepulciano e Cubatea, 1998
- La rivoluzione di Frà Tommaso Campanella by Mario Moretti, directed by Mario Moretti, Teatro Ghione di Roma, 1999
- Diana e la Tuda by Luigi Pirandello, directed by A. Foà, produzione La Pirandelliana, Teatro Franco Parenti di Milano
- Tutti gli uomini del deficiente directed by Paolo Costella, 1999

=== 2000s ===
- Amphitryon Toujours by Arnoldo Foà, directed by Arnoldo Foà, produzione La Pirandelliana, Spoleto Festival 2000, 2000
- Ultimo giorno di un condannato a morte, di Giovanni De Feudis, directed by Giovanni De Feudis (da Le dernier jour d’un condamné by Victor Hugo)
- L’Igiene dell’Assassino by Amélie Nothomb, directed by Andrea Dosio, Torino Spettacoli, Teatro Erba di Torino, 2001
- ll Vantone by Pier Paolo Pasolini (dal Miles Gloriosus by Plautus), directed by Pino Quartullo
- Colpevole innocenza by Ronald Harwood, directed by Arnoldo Foà, Compagnia Mario Chiocchio, Teatro Greco di Roma
- Pluto by Aristofanes, adattamento e directed by A. Foà, 2002
- Duse/D’Annunzio by Barbara Amodio, directed by Angelo Gallo
- Novecento by Alessandro Baricco, directed by Gabriele Vacis, Produzione Mondrian Kilroy Fund e Irma Spettacoli, 2003–2004
- Oggi by Arnoldo Foà, directed by A. Foà, con A. Foà, produzione La Pirandelliana, Teatro Ghione di Roma, 2005
- Patrizia, il Musical, di Arnoldo Foà, Teatro Sistina
- Sul lago dorato by Ernest Thompson (adattamento di Nino Marino), directed by Maurizio Panici, produzione La Pirandelliana, Festival di Borgio Verezzi 2006
- Scene dalla vita di Mozart testo di Lorenzo Arruga, musica di Albert Lortzing, regia Dan Jemmett, direzione musicale Paolo Arrivabeni, con Arnoldo Foà, Teatro Comunale di Bologna
- Io, Arturo Toscanini, di Piero Melograni, directed by Giulio Farnese, Teatro Politeama Pratese, 2007

== Selected filmography ==
- Ettore Fieramosca (1938) - Un gentiluomo alla corte di Graiano
- Crispino e la comare (1938)
- Orizzonte dipinto (1941)
- Fuga nella tempesta (1945)
- O sole mio (1946) - Peppino
- The Testimony (1946) - L'impiegato dell'anagrafe
- Un giorno nella vita (1946) - Brusan
- Sangue a Ca' Foscari (1946) - Cavaliere della Rosa (narrator, uncredited)
- The Opium Den (1947)
- The Captain's Daughter (1947) - Serguei (uncredited)
- L'eroe della strada (1948) - Il pubblico ministero
- The Earth Cries Out (1949) - Terrorista
- Yvonne of the Night (1949) - Il senatore
- Adam and Eve (1949) - Achille
- Marechiaro (1949) - L'avvocato difensore
- The Merry Widower (1949) - Roy
- The Cadets of Gascony (1950) - Un ufficiale (uncredited)
- The Lion of Amalfi (1950)
- Toto the Sheik (1950) - Il matto
- Il Brigante Musolino (1950) - The advocate
- Tomorrow Is Another Day (1951) - Cesare
- Beauties on Bicycles (1951) - Sergente
- Double Cross (1951) - Avvocato Luigi
- Verginità (1951) - Renè
- Never Take No for an Answer (1951)
- Lorenzaccio (1951) - Il duca Alessandro
- Viva il cinema! (1952) - Producer
- Stranger on the Prowl (1952) - Inspector-in-Charge
- In Olden Days (1952) - Contadino toscano (segment "Questione d'interesse")
- Five Paupers in an Automobile (1952) - Alfredo
- Immortal Melodies (1952) - Narratore (narrator, uncredited)
- Red Love (1952) - Sebastiano
- Genoese Dragnet (1952) - Basilio
- La storia del fornaretto di Venezia (1952) - Alvise Venier
- Infame accusa (1953) - Don Antonio
- Lucrèce Borgia (1953) - Michelotto
- Ivan, Son of the White Devil (1953) - Emiro Abdul
- La figlia del forzato (1953) - Dott. Palmieri
- Viva la rivista! (1953)
- The Stranger's Hand (1954) - Commissioner
- Love in a Hot Climate (1954) - Riera
- Avanzi di galera (1954) - Il capo
- Angela (1954) - Capt. Ambrosi
- Cardinal Lambertini (1954) - Il duca di Montimar
- The Courier of Moncenisio (1954) - conte di Brissac
- Rosso e nero (1954)
- Toto and Carolina (1955) - Commissario
- Le ragazze di San Frediano (1955) - Narrator (narrator, uncredited)
- Chéri-Bibi (1955) - Le Kanak
- Non c'è amore più grande (1955) - Romolo Rocca
- Destination Piovarolo (1955) - Il podestà
- The Letters Page (1955) - Narratore (uncredited)
- Cantami buongiorno tristezza (1955) - Marco Salviati
- Altair (1956) - Narratore (uncredited)
- Difendo il mio amore (1956) - L'avvocato Guarini
- Supreme Confession (1956) - Armando
- Io, Caterina (1957)
- Desert Warrior (1957) - (uncredited)
- Rascel-Fifì (1957) - Narratore (uncredited)
- The Silent Enemy (1958) - Tomolino
- Vengeance (1958) - Bermejo
- The Adventures of Nicholas Nickleby (1958, TV Series) - Rodolfo Nickleby
- Pia de' Tolomei (1958) as Nello Della Pietra
- Herod the Great (1959) - (uncredited)
- The Nights of Lucretia Borgia (1959) - Astorre
- Desert Desperadoes (1959) - The Chaldean
- Carthage in Flames (1960)
- Les canailles (1960) - Tonioni
- The Loves of Salammbo (1960) - Spendius
- The Angel Wore Red (1960) - Insurgent Major
- Captain Blood (1960) - Concini
- Heaven on Earth (1960) - Count Verbano
- The Tartars (1961) - Ciu Lang
- Barabbas (1961) - Joseph of Arimathea
- Damon and Pythias (1962) - Dionysius
- The Reluctant Saint (1962) - Felixa - Giuseppe's Father
- War Gods of Babylon (1962) - Zoroastro
- The Trial (1962) - Inspector A
- 100 Horsemen (1964) - Don Gonzalo Herrera y Menendez
- The Son of Cleopatra (1964) - Varrone
- Judith (1966) - Interrogator
- The Sailor from Gibraltar (1967) - Man on Train
- The Shoes of the Fisherman (1968) - Gelasio
- Borsalino (1970) - Marello
- Cause of Divorce (1972) - Maini - father of Ernesta
- Incensurato, provata disonestà, carriera assicurata, cercasi (1972) - Democristiani / comunista / missino
- Primo tango a Roma... storia d'amore e d'alchimia (1973) - Sciarra Colonna
- The Devil Is a Woman (1974) - Monsignor Badensky
- Il domestico (1974) - Ambrogio Perigatti / Engineer
- A Matter of Time (1976) - Pavelli (uncredited)
- A Dangerous Toy (1979) - Nicola Griffo
- Cento giorni a Palermo (1984) - Rognoni, ministro dell'Interno
- L'attenzione (1985) - Direttore Giornale
- The King's Whore (1990) - 1st Priest
- Anteprima al terzo braccio (1995)
- Ardena (1997) - Rosolino
- Crimine contro crimine (1998) - Sua Eccellenza
- Asini (1999) - The Cardinal
- All the Moron's Men (1999) - Presidente Leone Stella
- Nora (2000) - Sig. Canarutto (uncredited)
- Calmi Cuori Appassionati (2001) - The Restorer
- I Love You Eugenio (2002) - Prof. Bonelli
- The Good Pope: Pope John XXIII (2003, TV Movie) - Cardinal Ottaviani
- Do You Mind If I Kiss Mommy? (2003) - Renato
- Gente di Roma (2003) - Restaurant Father
- La febbre (2005) - Il Presidente
- Anthony, Warrior of God (2006) - Papa Gregorio IX
- Anime veloci (2006) - Padre di Suzanne
- Quale amore (2006) - Robert Stefelmayer
- Il 7 e l'8 (2007) - Padre Superiore
- The Rage (2008)
- Legami di sangue (2009) - Father
- The Red Shadows (2009) - Massimo
- Ce n'è per tutti (2009) - Grandfather
- Up (2009) - Charles F. Muntz (Italian version)
- Sul nome Bach (2011)
