= Ferragosto in bikini =

- Directed by: Marino Girolami
- Starring: Walter Chiari; Ennio Girolami; Valeria Fabrizi; Lauretta Masiero; Gérard Landry; Gloria Milland; Bice Valori; Alberto Talegalli
- Cinematography: Augusto Tiezzi
- Music by: Carlo Savina
- Release date: 1960
- Country: Italy
- Language: Italian

Ferragosto in bikini is a 1960 Italian comedy film directed by Marino Girolami. The film is named after a hit song of musical group Quartetto Cetra, who also makes a brief cameo appearance.

== Cast ==
- Walter Chiari: Walter
- Ennio Girolami: Dario
- Valeria Fabrizi: Ainé
- Lauretta Masiero: Paola Piccoli
- Raimondo Vianello: Ragionier Piccoli
- Marisa Merlini: Marta
- Mario Carotenuto: Cavalier Bonaccorsi
- Gérard Landry: Franz Heinrich
- Bice Valori: Gladys
- Mara Fiè: Elena
- Alberto Talegalli: Bagnante paesano
- Carlo Delle Piane: Carlo
- Toni Ucci: Raffaele
- Tiberio Murgia: Carmelo Pappalardo
- Luigi Pavese: Commedator Cazzaniga
- Virgilio Vidor: Bambino che discute con il Cavaliere
- Elyane Pade: Denise
- Nietta Zocchi: Miss Porro
- Dori Dorica: moglie del bagnante paesano
- Enzo Garinei: bagnante delle parole crociate
- Ciccio Barbi: segretario del cavaliere
- Tino Bianchi: Dr. Labianca
- Silvio Bagolini: Subacqueo
- Pina Gallini: Bagnante
