= Alba Arnova =

Italian-Argentine ballerina and film actress

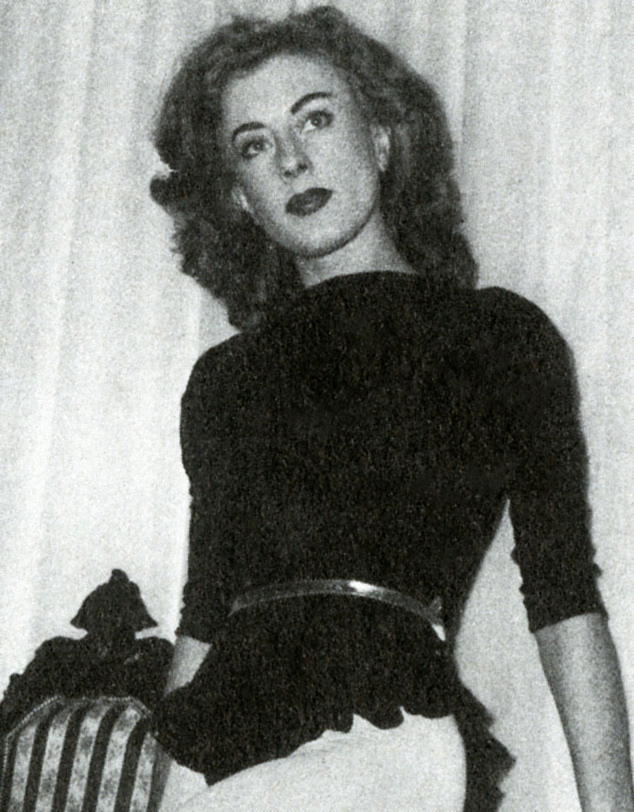
- Arnova in 1955
- Born: Alba Fossati; 15 March 1930; Buenos Aires, Argentina
- Died: 11 March 2018 (aged 87); Rome, Italy
- Occupations: Ballerina; actress
- Spouse: Gianni Ferrio

Alba Arnova (15 March 1930 – 11 March 2018) was an Italian-Argentine ballerina and actress.

== Life and career ==
Born in Buenos Aires as Alba Fossati, daughter of two Italian emigrants, Arnova studied piano at the Conservatory and enrolled in the university at the medical faculty. She became the principal classical dancer of the Teatro Colón in Buenos Aires and changed her surname first to Ars Nova and then to Arnova. She left Argentina in 1948, for a six months stage tour, and eventually remained in Rome, where she worked first in theater as a classical dancer and as a revue and avanspettacolo soubrette. She began acting in films in 1949, though usually in minor roles.

In 1956 Arnova created a controversy when she appeared on the RAI television variety show La piazzetta wearing a tight leotard that made her appear semi-nude because of the lighting effects and the black-and-white system. The show was suspended and she was subsequently fired and banned from Italian television. She subsequently chose to leave show business.

Arnova was married to composer and conductor Gianni Ferrio.

== Filmography ==
- A Night of Fame, Director: Mario Monicelli and Steno (1949)
- Fugitive Lady, Director: Sidney Salkow and Marino Girolami (1950)
- La cintura di castità, Director: Camillo Mastrocinque (1950)
- Miracle in Milan, Director: Vittorio De Sica (1950)
- Totò Tarzan, Director: Mario Mattoli (1951)
- Arrivano i nostri, Director: Mario Mattoli (1951)
- O.K. Nerone, Director: Mario Soldati (1951)
- In Olden Days, Director: Alessandro Blasetti (1952)
- Finalmente libero, Director: Mario Amendola (1953)
- Loving You Is My Sin, Director: Sergio Grieco (1953)
- Aida, Director: Clemente Fracassi (1953)
- My Life Is Yours, Director: Giuseppe Masini (1953)
- La Gioconda, Director: Giacinto Solito (1953)
- Mid-Century Loves, Director: Mario Chiari (1954)
- 100 Years of Love, Director: Lionello De Felice (1954)
- Red and Black, Director: Domenico Paolella (1954)
- Farewell, My Beautiful Lady, Director: Fernando Cerchio (1954)
- The Lady of the Camellias, Director: Raymond Bernard (1954)
- Una donna prega, Director: Anton Giulio Majano (1954)
- A Slice of Life, Director: Alessandro Blasetti (1954)
- Loves of Three Queens, Director: Marc Allègret (1954)
- Figaro, barbiere di Siviglia, Director: Camillo Mastrocinque (1955)
- I pinguini ci guardano, Director: Guido Leoni (1955)
- Il motivo in maschera, Director: Stefano Canzio (1955)
- La ribalta dei sogni, Director: Ernesto Araciba (1955)
- Una viuda difícil Director Fernando Alaya (1957)
- The Mighty Crusaders, Director: Carlo Ludovico Bragaglia (1957)
- Europa di notte, Director: Alessandro Blasetti (1959)
