= Walter Santesso =

Italian actor and director

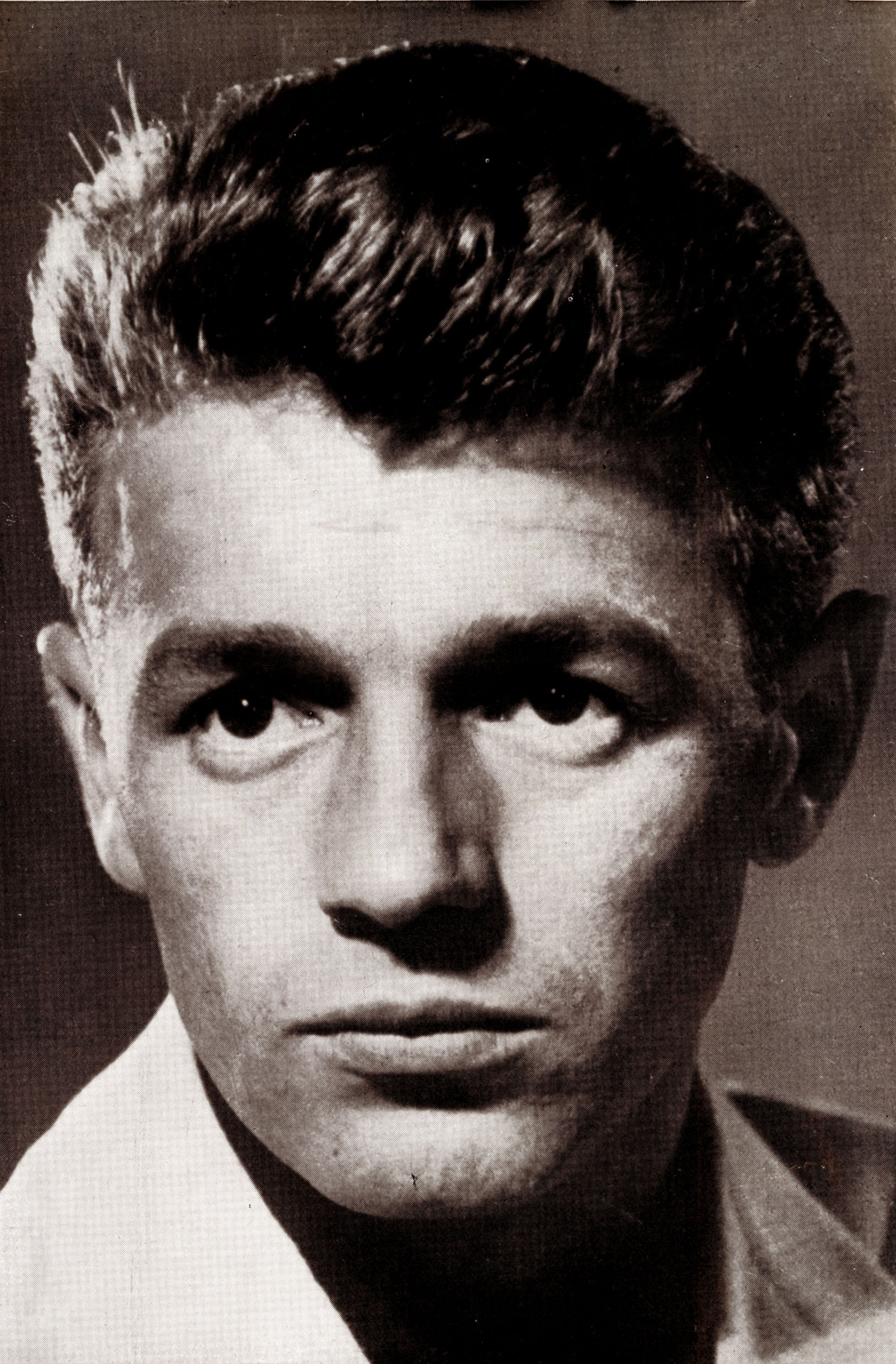
- Born: 27 February 1931; Padua, Kingdom of Italy
- Died: 20 January 2008 (aged 76); Padua, Italy
- Occupations: Actor, director
- Years active: 1951–1969

Walter Santesso (27 February 1931 in Padua, Italy – 20 January 2008) was an Italian film actor and director. His character name "Paparazzo" in Federico Fellini's 1960 film La Dolce Vita has become synonymous with modern celebrity/tabloid photographers, who are collectively referred to as paparazzi.

== Filmography ==
| Year | Title | Role | Notes |
|---|---|---|---|
| 1951 | The Last Sentence | Collega d'università | |
| 1952 | The Man in My Life | Michel | directed by Guy Lefranc |
| 1952 | Serenata amara | Fabrizio | |
| 1954 | The Cheerful Squadron | Defaulter | |
| 1954 | I cinque dell'Adamello | Piero | |
| 1954 | Love Song | Mario | |
| 1956 | Il suo più grande amore | Paolo | |
| 1957 | El Alamein | Gennaro | |
| 1957 | Classe di ferro | Soldato veneto | |
| 1958 | The Sky Burns | Damonte | |
| 1958 | Legs of Gold | Teodoro | |
| 1958 | Promesse di marinaio | Marinaio veneto | |
| 1958 | Caporale di giornata | Felice Pavan | Uncredited |
| 1959 | Avventura a Capri | Giulio | |
| 1959 | I mafiosi | | |
| 1960 | La Dolce Vita | Paparazzo | |
| 1960 | Il Mattatore | Paparazzo | Uncredited |
| 1960 | Le bal des espions | | |
| 1960 | Mobby Jackson | | |
| 1960 | Madri pericolose | Peppino detto 'Dolce Vita' | |
| 1961 | Cronache del '22 | | (segment "Spedizione punitiva") |
| 1961 | Scano Boa | | |
| 1961 | L'urlo dei bolidi | Stefano Valle | |
| 1962 | Dulcinea | Diego | |
| 1963 | Objetivo: las estrellas | Lucas | |
| 1966 | Eroe vagabondo | | |
| 1969 | Mercanti di vergini | | (final film role) |
