= Chronicle of Poor Lovers =

1954 film

- Film poster
- Directed by: Carlo Lizzani
- Written by: Vasco Pratolini (novel); Sergio Amidei; Giuseppe Dagnino; Carlo Lizzani; Massimo Mida
- Starring: Anna Maria Ferrero; Cosetta Greco; Antonella Lualdi; Marcello Mastroianni
- Cinematography: Gianni Di Venanzo
- Edited by: Enzo Alfonzi
- Music by: Mario Zafred
- Release date: 6 February 1954
- Running time: 115 minutes
- Country: Italy
- Language: Italian

Chronicle of Poor Lovers (Italian: Cronache di poveri amanti) is a 1954 Italian drama film directed by Carlo Lizzani. It competed for the Grand Prix at the 1954 Cannes Film Festival.

== Plot ==
Florence, spring of 1925, the young typographer Mario moves to the Santa Croce district, in via del Corno, to be closer to his sweetheart, Bianca, thus becoming in turn a "crowsman" (pun between the name of the inhabitants of the via del "Corno", but also the croaking "crows") and finding themselves sharing the daily events of the inhabitants of that small popular world in the dark years of the rise of Fascism.

His landlord is the farrier Corrado, known as Maciste, a well-known anti-fascist and formerly Ardito del Popolo like his friend Ugo, a street vendor of fruit and entertainment. The small street is also home to a couple of convinced fascists: the accountant Carlino Bencini, a legionary from Rijeka and an insurance employee; and his colleague, friend and roommate Osvaldo. Among the other neighbors, the cobbler Staderini; Ristori, owner of the small hotel that houses some prostitutes, including Elisa, the mistress of Nanni the "admonished"; Clara, Bianca's friend and constantly tormented by her boyfriend because she agrees to marry him; Alfredo Campolmi, owner of the grocery store and fresh husband of Milena.

Immobile in bed but constantly informed of what is happening in the street thanks to the little servant Gesuina, "the Lady", a maitresse, establishes a dense network of relationships and binds everyone to herself through the loans she grants.

The quiet coexistence in via del Corno is dramatically broken when Alfredo, just married and determined to make his business prosper, refuses to pay the contribution to the local section of the Fascist Party and suffers a brutal beating, which leaves him so heavily marked in the body that having to go to the sanatorium and give up the grocery store.

== Cast ==
- Anna Maria Ferrero as Gesuina
- Cosetta Greco as Elisa
- Antonella Lualdi as Milena Campolmi
- Marcello Mastroianni as Ugo
- Bruno Berellini as Carlino Bencini
- Irene Cefaro as Clara
- Adolfo Consolini as Maciste
- Giuliano Montaldo as Alfredo Campolmi
- Gabriele Tinti as Mario Parigi
- Eva Vanicek as Bianca Quagliotti
- Wanda Capodaglio as La Signora
- Mimmo Maggio
- Andrea Petricca
- Garibaldo Lucii as Staderini
- Mario Piloni as Osvaldo
- Ada Colangeli as Miss Fidalma
- Giuseppe Angelini
