= The Earrings of Madame de... =

1953 film by Max Ophüls

- French theatrical release poster
- French: Madame de...
- Directed by: Max Ophüls
- Screenplay by: Marcel Achard; Max Ophüls; Annette Wademant
- Based on: Madame de... (1951 novel) by Louise de Vilmorin
- Produced by: Henri Bérard; Henry Deutschmeister; Angelo Rizzoli
- Starring: Charles Boyer; Danielle Darrieux; Vittorio De Sica; Jean Debucourt; Mireille Perrey; Lia Di Leo
- Cinematography: Christian Matras
- Edited by: Borys Lewin
- Music by: Oscar Straus; Georges Van Parys
- Production companies: Franco London Films; Indusfilms; Rizzoli Film
- Distributed by: Gaumont Distribution (France)
- Release dates: 16 September 1953 (France); 12 November 1953 (Italy)
- Running time: 105 minutes
- Countries: France; Italy
- Language: French

The Earrings of Madame de... (French: Madame de... [madam də]) is a 1953 period romantic drama film directed by Max Ophüls from a screenplay he co-wrote with Marcel Achard and Annette Wademant, and starring Charles Boyer, Danielle Darrieux and Vittorio De Sica. The story revolves around the extramarital affairs of an aristocratic couple, in which the titular earrings play a central role.

The film was a French and Italian co-production, and based on the 1951 novel Madame de... by Louise Lévêque de Vilmorin. The title reflects the fact that the surname of the main character is never revealed—the few times it might be heard or seen, it is obscured by noise or a camera trick.

Released by Gaumont on September 16, 1953, the film initially received mixed reviews, though it received an Oscar nomination for Best Costume Design. In the years since, The Earrings of Madame de... has been acclaimed by critics and filmmakers as a masterpiece of 1950s French cinema and one of Ophüls' finest works, with critic Andrew Sarris calling it "the most perfect film ever made".

== Plot ==
In Belle Époque Paris, Louise is an aristocratic woman married to André, who is both a count and a general in the French army. Relations between Louise and André are companionable, but they sleep in separate rooms and have no children, and André has a mistress, Lola.

A spoiled and superficial woman, Louise has amassed large debts due to her lifestyle, so she arranges to secretly sell a pair of valuable heart-shaped diamond earrings that André gave her as a wedding present, but which she does not care for, back to the original jeweler, Rémy, disguising their disappearance by pretending to have lost them at the opera. The search for the earrings eventually reaches the newspapers, which prompts Rémy to go to André and discreetly offer to sell them back. André accepts cheerfully and, rather than confront his wife, coolly gives the earrings to Lola, of whom he has recently grown tired, as a parting gift when seeing her off on a train to Constantinople.

Soon after arriving in Constantinople, Lola sells the earrings during a losing stint at the roulette table at a casino. They are purchased from a jewelry store by Baron Fabrizio Donati, an Italian diplomat. In Paris, Donati meets and becomes infatuated with Louise, and they fall in love while dancing together at a series of formal balls while André is away on maneuvers.

After André returns, Louise attracts attention when she faints upon seeing Donati fall from his horse during a hunting excursion. Embarrassed, she announces that she will take a holiday in the Italian lake district, hoping the trip will calm her growing feelings for Donati. Before she leaves, Donati visits and gives her the earrings he bought in Constantinople, unaware they had previously belonged to Louise.

Donati regales Louise with letters while she is gone, and she writes responses that she does not dare to send, and by the end of her trip, she finds that her love for Donati is deeper than ever. They meet secretly, and she confesses she can console herself when he is not around only through possession of the earrings, which she now identifies with him, rather than André.

So she can wear the earrings openly, Louise makes a show of "finding" them inside one of her gloves in front of André before a ball. He initially says nothing, but at the ball he separates Louise and Donati, takes the earrings from Louise, and quietly confronts Donati about them, revealing their history. He then instructs Donati to sell them back to Rémy, so he can buy them—again—and give them back to Louise. Before departing, Donati informs Louise he can no longer see her and expresses his pain at learning of her lies about the earrings.

Louise falls into a deep depression. André presents her with the earrings, but the ecstatic way she receives them causes him to change his mind. He informs her that she must give them to a niece who has just given birth, and she tearfully acquiesces. The niece's husband sells the earrings to Rémy to pay off some debts, and Rémy offers to sell them to André for a fourth time, but André angrily turns him away. Back at his shop, Rémy finds Louise waiting for him, and she arranges to buy the earrings back by selling some of the jewelry and furs that she had previously preferred to the earrings. When André discovers this, he goes to a gentleman's club and uses an innocuous professional slight as a pretext to challenge Donati to a duel with pistols.

When Louise cannot get Donati to withdraw from the duel, she goes to the Church of Saint-Étienne-du-Mont to pray at the shrine of St. Geneviève that he be spared, leaving the earrings as an offering. She races to the location of the duel and is approaching just as André, as the offended party, takes the first shot. When she does not hear a second shot, Louise slumps against a tree, and her maid runs for help, screaming, "She's dying!" The earrings are put on display at the church, alongside a plaque crediting Louise for their donation.

== Cast ==
- Charles Boyer as General André de...
- Danielle Darrieux as Countess Louise de...
- Vittorio De Sica as Baron Fabrizio Donati, an Italian diplomat
- Jean Debucourt as Rémy, a jeweler
- Jean Galland as Bernac, an acquaintance of André
- Mireille Perrey as Nounou, Louise's maid
- Lia Di Leo as Lola, André's mistress

Uncredited

- Serge Lecointe as Jérome, Rémy's son
- Guy Favières as Julien
- Daniel Mendaille as Passerby
- Gérard Buhr as Customs Officer
- Georges Paulais as Second at Duel
- Jean Toulout as Diplomat

== Production ==
Ophüls said he was attracted by the construction of the story, stating: "there is always the same axis around which the action continually turns like a carousel. A tiny, scarcely visible axis: a pair of earrings". However, the film's script became considerably different from de Vilmorin's short novel, and Ophüls stated that "besides the earrings, there's very little of the novel left in the film...[just] the senselessness of that woman's life." He spoke privately with Danielle Darrieux between takes throughout the shoot, telling her to portray the emptiness of her character.

With its glittering costumes and furnishings and swirling camera work, the montage of ballroom dancing scenes that represents the process of Louise and Donati falling in love in the film is a celebrated example of Ophüls' technique. In his original treatment for the film, every scene was to be shot through mirrors on walls and other locations, but his producers rejected the idea. After his experience shooting La Ronde (1950), Ophüls was determined to stay on budget and on schedule for this film, and he made extensive preparations during pre-production, with the result that he ended up completing production ahead of schedule and under budget.

Ophüls worked closely with art director Georges Annenkov to create the right atmosphere for the film. Annenkov designed the film's titular prop earrings, which were subsequently put on display at the Franco-London-Film production studios for many years.

Darrieux, Charles Boyer, and Annenkov had all worked together in 1936 on the film Mayerling, which was Darrieux's first leading role. Initially, Ophüls was too embarrassed to give direction to Vittorio De Sica out of respect for De Sica's work as a director, but the two became friends during the shoot of Madame de...

== Reception ==
The Earrings of Madame De... received mixed reviews when it was first released, but its reputation has grown over the years. On the review aggregator website Rotten Tomatoes, 97% of 36 critics' reviews of the film are positive, with an average rating of 8.7/10; the site's "critics consensus" reads: "Ophüls' graceful camerawork and visual portrayal of luxury and loss make Earrings a powerful French drama."

Jacques Rivette praised the film, calling it "a difficult work, in the fullest sense of the word, even in its writing, one in which everything aims to disconcert, distract the viewer from what is essential through the accumulation of secondary actions, wrong turns, repetitions and delays; a work in which the picturesque tries hard to conceal the pathetic." François Truffaut wrote that the film was very similar to Ophüls' 1933 German film Liebelei, stating that "the last half hour, the duel and the finale, is a remake pure and simple." In a 1961 article in Kulchur that was later reprinted in her first book, Pauline Kael praised the performances, "sensuous camerawork," "extraordinary romantic atmosphere," and "polished, epigrammatic dialogue."

When it was re-released in England in 1979, the film was received as a rediscovered masterpiece, with Derek Malcolm calling it "a supreme piece of film-making which hardly puts a foot wrong for 2 hours...a magnificent and utterly timeless dissection of passion and affection, the game of life and love itself." Lindsay Anderson criticized the film, however, writing: "the camera is never still; every shot has the tension of a conjuring trick. The sleight of hand is dazzling, but fatally distracting...With a supple, ingenious, glittering flow of images that is aesthetically the diametric opposite of Mme. de Vilmorin's chaste prose, he has made the film an excuse for a succession of rich, decorative displays...In all this visual frou-frou it is not surprising that the characters become lost and the interior development of the drama is almost completely unobserved."

Molly Haskell called the film a masterpiece with a cult following that grows every year, asserting that it is usually not as revered as other, more male-oriented films because it is a female-oriented film. Richard Roud has stated that Ophüls made film about "women. More specifically, women in love. Most often, women who are unhappily in love, or whom love brings misfortune of one kind or another."

In 2022, The Earrings of Madame De... was ranked as the 90th greatest film of all time in Sight and Sound's critics poll, and directors such as Wes Anderson and Edgar Wright listed it as one of their favorites. Stanley Kubrick also considered it one of his favorites, if not his favorite film of all time.

=== Awards ===
At the 27th Academy Awards, Georges Annenkov and Rosine Delamare were nominated for the Academy Award for Best Costume Design, Black-and-White for their work on the film.
