= The Last Sentence (1951 film) =

L' Ultima sentenza
- French theatrical poster
- Directed by: Mario Bonnard
- Written by: Mario Bonnard; Nicola Manzari
- Starring: Charles Vanel; Antonella Lualdi; Eleonora Rossi Drago
- Cinematography: Giuseppe La Torre
- Edited by: Paolo Bartolini
- Music by: Giulio Bonnard
- Production company: Pro Film
- Release date: 15 November 1951
- Running time: 91 minutes
- Country: Italy
- Language: Italian

The Last Sentence (Italian: L' ultima sentenza) is a 1951 Italian melodrama-crime film co-written and directed by Mario Bonnard and starring Charles Vanel, Antonella Lualdi and Eleonora Rossi Drago.

== Cast ==
- Charles Vanel as Marco Valsetti
- Antonella Lualdi as Daniela Valsetti
- Eleonora Rossi Drago as Marisa
- Jacques Sernas as Piero
- Erno Crisa as Roberto
- Harry Feist as Baron Polsok
- Dina Sassoli as Marta Onori
- Paolo Panelli as Michele
- Emma Baron as Piero's Mother
- Bianca Doria as Miss Farra
- Nino Pavese as Dr. Bini
- Mariliana Delli as Berta
- Yvonne Snyder as Elena Brian
- Armando Migliari as Giuseppe Andreani
- Walter Santesso as Student
- Luisa Della Noce (credited as Malù Della Noce)
