= Lorenzaccio (film) =

- Directed by: Raffaello Pacini
- Written by: Vittorio Nino Novarese; Raffaello Pacini; Giampiero Pucci; Alfred de Musset (play)
- Produced by: Luigi Rovere
- Starring: Giorgio Albertazzi; Folco Lulli; Anna Maria Ferrero
- Edited by: Rolando Benedetti
- Music by: Carlo Rustichelli
- Production company: Rovere
- Distributed by: Lux Film
- Release date: 1951
- Running time: 91 minutes
- Country: Italy
- Language: Italian

Lorenzaccio is a 1951 Italian historical drama film directed by Raffaello Pacini and starring Giorgio Albertazzi, Folco Lulli and Anna Maria Ferrero. It is an adaptation of the 1834 play Lorenzaccio by Alfred de Musset about the life of Lorenzino de' Medici.

== Cast ==
- Giorgio Albertazzi as Lorenzo de' Medici, nicknamed Lorenzaccio
- Folco Lulli as Scoronconcalo
- Anna Maria Ferrero as Luisa Strozzi
- Franca Marzi as Clarice
- Lia Di Leo as Courtesan
- Arnoldo Foà as Alessandro de' Medici, Duke of Florence
- Marcello Giorda
- Carlo D'Angelo
- Natale Cirino
- Silvio Bagolini
- Franco Balducci
- Fedele Gentile
- Alessandro Fersen
- Dolores Palumbo
- Mario Billi
- Piero Pastore
- Mercedes Brignone
- Vera Palumbo
- Giorgio Specchi as Ser Maurizio

== Production ==
The film's soundtrack was composed by Carlo Rustichelli.

== Reception ==
Comparing the film with the 1935 version of the adaptation of the play (Lorenzino de' Medici (film), Panorama wrote: "It would be necessary to be able to see the two films side by side also because in the initial phase of his career Albertazzi willingly presented himself as the heir and continuator of Moissi".

== Bibliography ==
- Alberto Farassino. Lux film. Il Castoro, 2000.
