= Lauretta Masiero =

Italian film actress (1927–2010)

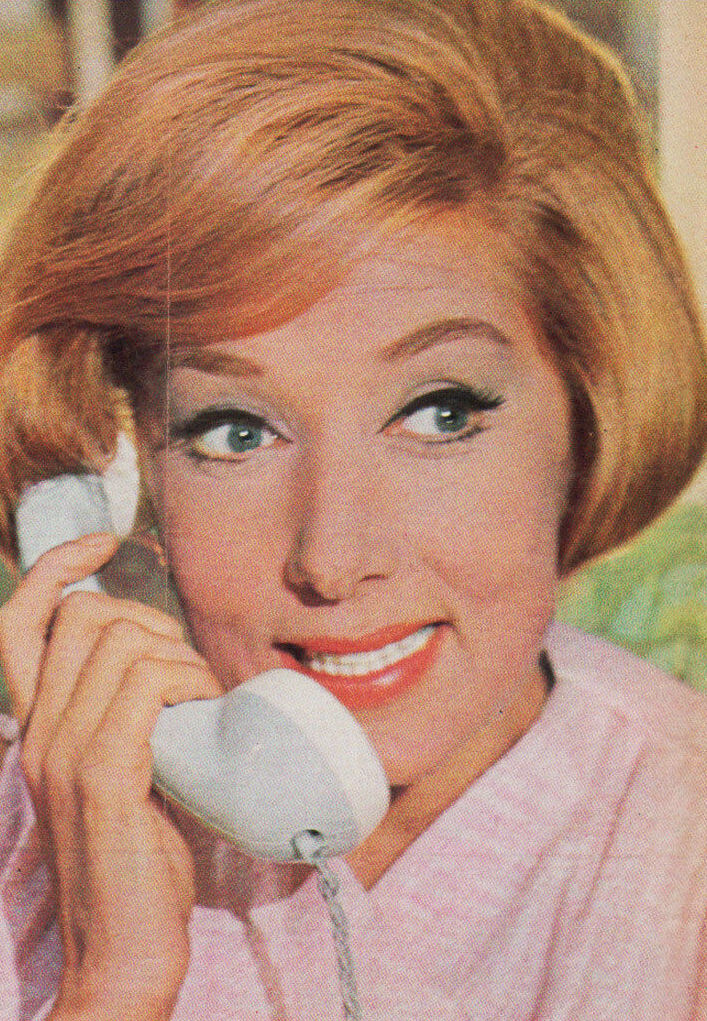
- Masiero in 1966
- Born: 25 October 1927; Venice, Kingdom of Italy
- Died: 23 March 2010 (aged 82); Rome, Italy
- Partner: Johnny Dorelli
- Children: Gianluca Guidi

Lauretta Masiero (25 October 1927 – 23 March 2010) was an Italian actress and singer.

== Early life and career ==
Venetian-born Lauretta Masiero debuted in the theater of varieties as a dancer with Wanda Osiris. In 1945 she debuted with Erminio Macario.

In 1962 she began acting in films. She worked with such stars as Totò, Ugo Tognazzi, Johnny Dorelli, Raimondo Vianello and Oreste Lionello. She portrayed the protagonist in the television series, The Adventures of Storm Laura.

== Death ==
Masiero died on 23 March 2010, aged 82, in a clinic in Rome, following a long hospitalization from Alzheimer's disease. She is entombed at the San Michele cemetery on the Isola di San Michele in Venice.

== Personal life ==
Masiero had a relationship with Johnny Dorelli; the couple had a son, actor Gianluca Guidi.

== Filmography ==
| Year | Title | Role | Notes |
|---|---|---|---|
| 1952 | The Tired Outlaw | Susanna | |
| 1952 | Canzoni di mezzo secolo | | |
| 1953 | Siamo tutti Milanesi | | |
| 1954 | Gran Varietà | Yvette la mondana | (episodio 'Fregoli') |
| 1954 | It Happened at the Police Station | Silvana Moretti | |
| 1954 | Baracca e burattini | | |
| 1958 | Toto in Paris | Aiutante del marchese / La zingara | |
| 1958 | Vento di primavera | Diana | |
| 1958 | Marinai, donne e guai | Mademoiselle Ester | |
| 1959 | Pensione Edelweiss | | |
| 1959 | Lui, lei e il nonno | Sandra | |
| 1959 | Le confident de ces dames | Une cliente | |
| 1959 | Tipi da spiaggia | Silvia Barenson | |
| 1960 | Ferragosto in bikini | Paola Piccoli | |
| 1960 | Caravan petrol | | |
| 1961 | Sua Eccellenza si fermò a mangiare | Ernesto's Lover | |
| 1961 | Cacciatori di dote | Alba Ibanez | |
| 1964 | Napoleone a Firenze | | |
| 1965 | Le avventure di Laura Storm | Laura Perruchetti alias Laura Storm | |
| 1976 | Sins in the Country | Concetta Lo Curcio | |
| 1990 | Captain Fracassa's Journey | Lady Leonarde | |
| 1992 | Ostinato destino | Carolina Rambaldi | |
