= The Tired Outlaw =

1952 film

- Directed by: Fernando Cerchio
- Written by: Emo Bistolfi; Sandro Continenza; Mario Guerra; Renato Rascel; Carlo Romano; Vittorio Veltroni
- Produced by: Emo Bistolfi; Ezio Gagliardo
- Starring: Renato Rascel; Lauretta Masiero; Lia Di Leo
- Cinematography: Tino Santoni
- Edited by: Lionello Massobrio
- Music by: Angelo Francesco Lavagnino
- Production company: Iris Films
- Distributed by: Iris Films
- Release date: 22 December 1952
- Running time: 95 minutes
- Country: Italy
- Language: Italian

The Tired Outlaw (Italian: Il bandolero stanco) is a 1952 Italian comedy western film directed by Fernando Cerchio and starring Renato Rascel, Lauretta Masiero and Lia Di Leo. The film's sets were designed by the art director Gianni Polidori.

== Synopsis ==
Hoping to win over the woman he loves, an impoverished man named Pepito travels away to become a gold speculator. He unexpectadly strikes it rich, becoming the town's wealthiest residen while earning several enemies and befriending a sympathetic singer names Susana. When Carmen finally arives to marry him, he discovered she is in a league with the corrupt sheriff.

== Cast ==
- Renato Rascel as Pepito
- Lauretta Masiero as Susana
- Franco Jamonte as Fred
- Tino Buazzelli as Paco
- Lia Di Leo as Carmen
- Gigi Bonos as Priest
- Silvio Bagolini

== Bibliography ==
- Curti, Roberto. Mavericks of Italian Cinema: Eight Unorthodox Filmmakers, 1940s–2000s. McFarland, 2018.
