= Kean: Genius or Scoundrel =

1956 film by Vittorio Gassman, Francesco Rosi

- German theatrical poster
- Directed by: Vittorio Gassman
- Written by: Suso Cecchi D'Amico; Vittorio Gassman; Francesco Rosi
- Produced by: Franco Cristaldi
- Starring: Vittorio Gassman; Eleonora Rossi Drago; Anna Maria Ferrero; Gérard Landry
- Cinematography: Gianni Di Venanzo
- Edited by: Enzo Alfonzi
- Music by: Roman Vlad
- Production company: Lux Film
- Distributed by: Lux Film
- Release date: 4 March 1957
- Running time: 83 minutes
- Country: Italy
- Language: Italian

Kean: Genius or Scoundrel (Italian: Kean - Genio e sregolatezza) is a 1956 Italian historical biographical film co-written, directed by and starring Vittorio Gassman. It also features Eleonora Rossi Drago, Gérard Landry and Valentina Cortese A dramatization of the life of nineteenth century actor Edmund Kean, it is based on the drama play Kean (1836) by Alexandre Dumas and its 1953 adaptation with the same name by Jean-Paul Sartre. It was Gassman's first film as director. It was screened at the Locarno Film Festival in 1957.

The film's sets were designed by the art director Gianni Polidori. Much of the film was shot at the Teatro Valle in Rome.

== Plot ==
In 19th century London, Edmund Kean was an adored Shakespearean comedian. An inveterate Don Juan, he amuses good London society with his eloquence and his wit. Eléna, the charming wife of the Danish ambassador, is in love with the actor. The Prince of Wales learns that this emotion is mutual, and offers her to give up this idyll for a large sum of money. But soon, Kean falls in love with Anna, a young but promising first actress.

== Cast ==
- Vittorio Gassman as Edmund Kean
- Eleonora Rossi Drago as Countess Elena Koefeld
- Anna Maria Ferrero as Anna Damby
- Valentina Cortese as Fanny
- Helmut Dantine as Lord Mewill
- Carlo Mazzarella as Dario
- Cesco Baseggio as Salomon
- Nerio Bernardi as Count Koefeld
- Mario Carotenuto as Peter Patt
- Dina Sassoli as Amy
- Bianca Maria Fabbri as Prima attrice
- Amedeo Girardi as Bob
- Pietro Tordi as Cochrane

== Bibliography ==
- Moliterno, Gino. The A to Z of Italian Cinema. Scarecrow Press, 2009.
