= The Piano Tuner Has Arrived =

1952 film

- Directed by: Duilio Coletti
- Written by: Mario Amendola; Paola Riccora; Ruggero Maccari; Mario Brancacci; Augusto Borselli; Pierre Veber (play)
- Produced by: Carlo Ponti
- Starring: Nino Taranto; Alberto Sordi; Virgilio Riento
- Cinematography: Renato Del Frate
- Edited by: Jolanda Benvenuti
- Music by: Armando Fragna
- Production companies: Itala Film; Titanus Film
- Release date: 1952
- Running time: 92 minutes
- Country: Italy
- Language: Italian

The Piano Tuner Has Arrived (Italian: È arrivato l'accordatore) is a 1952 Italian comedy film directed by Duilio Coletti and starring Nino Taranto, Alberto Sordi and Virgilio Riento.

The film's sets were designed by Ottavio Scotti.

== Cast ==
- Nino Taranto as Achille Scozzella
- Alberto Sordi as Avvocato Adolfo
- Virgilio Riento as Bartolomeo Porretti
- Tamara Lees as Adelina Porretti
- Antonella Lualdi as Giulietta Narducci
- Ave Ninchi as Signora Narducci
- Alberto Sorrentino as Signor Narducci
- Fanfulla as Adetto militare di Limonia
- Lia Di Leo as Cameriera
- Sophia Loren as Amica di Giulietta
- Galeazzo Benti as Un giornalista
- Armando Migliari as Commissario Filippini
- Giampiero Sammari as Il bambino
- Silvio Bagolini as Un lestofante
- Natale Cirino as the wanted Danilo "Il magro"
- Carlo Sposito
- Carlo Delle Piane
- Marco Tulli
- Gondrano Trucchi
- Arnaldo Mochetti
- Antonio Amendola
- Anna Arena
- Mario Siletti
- Alfredo Rizzo
- Giuseppe Ricagno
- Pasquale Fasciano
- Rino Leandri
- Giuliana Farnese
- Carla Bertinelli
- Francesca Paoli
- Pamela Palma
- Nyta Dover
- Guglielmo Inglese as band's cook

== Bibliography ==
- Kerry Segrave & Linda Martin. The continental actress: European film stars of the postwar era. McFarland, 1990.
