= Cose da pazzi =

1954 film

- Film poster
- Directed by: G. W. Pabst
- Written by: Léo Lania; Bruno Paolinelli; Bruno Valeri
- Produced by: Bruno Paolinelli
- Starring: Aldo Fabrizi
- Cinematography: Mario Bava; Gábor Pogány
- Edited by: Mario Serandrei
- Music by: Mario Nascimbene, directed by Franco Ferrara
- Distributed by: Variety Distribution
- Release date: 20 March 1954
- Running time: 81 minutes
- Country: Italy
- Language: Italian

Crazy Affairs (Italian: Cose da pazzi) is a 1954 Italian comedy film directed by G. W. Pabst. In May 2016, it was shown as part of a retrospective of Pabst's films at the Filmarchiv Austria.

== Cast ==
- Aldo Fabrizi as Gnauli
- Carla Del Poggio as Dalia Rossi
- Enrico Viarisio as Professor Ruiz
- Enzo Fiermonte as Paolo
- Rita Giannuzzi as Silvia
- Lianella Carell as Diomira Guidi
- Arturo Bragaglia as The fisherman as a Patient
- Oscar Andriani as The lunatic who writes a letter
- Marco Tulli as The Inventor as a patient
- Gianna Baragli as Madwoman playing canasta
- Nietta Zocchi as Madwoman playing canasta
- Lia Di Leo as The Nurse
- Walter Brandi as A doctor
