= Gianni Polidori =

Italian art director

- Born: 7 November 1923; Rome, Lazio, Italy
- Died: 19 August 1992 (aged 68); Rome, Lazio, Italy
- Occupation: Art director
- Years active: 1951-1976

Gianni Polidori (1923–1992) was an Italian art director. He designed the sets for several films by Michelangelo Antonioni.

== Selected filmography ==
- Bellissima (1951)
- Honeymoon Deferred (1951)
- The Overcoat (1952)
- The Tired Outlaw (1952)
- At Sword's Edge (1952)
- The Lady Without Camelias (1953)
- Love in the City (1953)
- I vinti (1953)
- We, the Women (1953)
- The Cheerful Squadron (1954)
- Marriage (1954)
- Le Amiche (1955)
- Rascel-Fifì (1957)
- Kean: Genius or Scoundrel (1957)
- Goliath and the Vampires (1961)

== Bibliography ==
- Seymour Chatman. Antonioni, Or, The Surface of the World. University of California Press, 1985.
