= The Earth Cries Out =

1948 Italian film by Duilio Coletti

- Directed by: Duilio Coletti
- Written by: Giorgio Prosperi; Carlo Levi; Alessandro Fersen
- Story by: Tullio Pinelli
- Cinematography: Domenico Scala
- Edited by: Mario Serandrei
- Music by: Alessandro Cicognini
- Release date: 1948
- Running time: 90 minutes
- Country: Italy
- Language: Italian

The Earth Cries Out (Italian: Il grido della terra, also known as Exodus) is a 1948 Italian action-drama film directed by Duilio Coletti.

In 2008 it was restored and shown as part of a retrospective "Questi fantasmi: Cinema italiano ritrovato" at the 65th Venice International Film Festival.

== Cast ==
- Marina Berti as Dina
- Andrea Checchi as Ariè
- Vivi Gioi as Judith
- Carlo Ninchi as Comandante della nave
- Elena Zareschi as Ada
- Filippo Scelzo as Professor Tannen
- Vittorio Duse
- Cesare Polacco
- Arnoldo Foà
- Nerio Bernardi
- Wanda Capodaglio
