= Countersex =

1964 film

- Directed by: Franco Rossi; Marco Ferreri; Renato Castellani
- Produced by: Carlo Ponti
- Starring: Nino Manfredi; Ugo Tognazzi; Anna Maria Ferrero
- Cinematography: Leonida Barboni; Roberto Gerardi; Ennio Guarnieri
- Music by: Piero Umiliani; Roman Vlad; Teo Usuelli
- Release date: 4 October 1968
- Country: Italy
- Language: Italian

Controsesso, internationally released as Countersex, is a 1964 Italian anthology comedy film directed by Franco Rossi, Marco Ferreri and Renato Castellani. All the episodes have sex as main theme. The episode of Ferreri is considered by several critics as the masterpiece of the first Italian period of the director.

== Cast ==
=== Cocaina di domenica ===
- Nino Manfredi: Sandro Cioffi
- Anna Maria Ferrero (in her final film role): Marcella
- Renzo Marignano: boyfriend of Sandro's sister

(directed by Franco Rossi, written by Cesare Zavattini, Piero De Bernardi and Leonardo Benvenuti)

=== Il professore ===
- Ugo Tognazzi: The professor
- Elvira Paoloni: The grandmother

(directed by Marco Ferreri, written by Rafael Azcona and Marco Ferreri)

=== Una donna d'affari ===
- Nino Manfredi: Andrea Spadini
- Dolores Wettach: Giovanna
- Umberto D'Orsi: Armando

(directed by Renato Castellani, written by Tonino Guerra and Giorgio Salvioni)
