= Destination Piovarolo =

- Directed by: Domenico Paolella
- Written by: Leonardo Benvenuti; Piero De Bernardi; Stefano Strucchi
- Produced by: Lux Film
- Starring: Totò; Tina Pica
- Cinematography: Mario Fioretti
- Edited by: Gisa Radicchi Levi
- Music by: Angelo Francesco Lavagnino
- Release date: 1955
- Running time: 89 min
- Country: Italy
- Language: Italian

Destination Piovarolo (Italian: Destinazione Piovarolo) is a 1955 Italian comedy film directed by Domenico Paolella.

== Plot summary ==
In 1922, during Fascism, Antonio La Quaglia accepts the assignment to the station master in a remote town called Piovarolo, because that's where it always rains. Antonio soon realizes that life in the small village is sad, because the inhabitants are all old, deluded, dying, without hope. Antonio so hopefully he will be moved to a larger city; but the years pass and Antonio holds the same job. One day he sees off the train a beautiful lady, who does the primary school teacher. Soon the two get married and start a family, but always Antonio wants to get away from Piovarolo, but politics and the ministry do not care at all about him.

== Cast ==
- Totò: Antonio La Quaglia
- Marisa Merlini: Sara
- Irene Cefaro: Mariuccia La Quaglia
- Tina Pica: Beppa
- Ernesto Almirante: Ernesto
- Arnoldo Foà: the Podestà
- Enrico Viarisio: De Fassi
- Paolo Stoppa: Marcello Gorini
- Nando Bruno: Sacristan
- Mario Carotenuto: Outgoing station master
- Giacomo Furia: De Fassi's secretary
- Carlo Mazzarella: Gorini's secretary
- Nino Besozzi: Minister
- Leopoldo Trieste: Minister's secretary
- Alessandra Panaro
