= Love Song (1954 film) =

- Directed by: Giorgio Simonelli
- Written by: Baccio Agnoletti; Nicola Manzari; Giorgio Simonelli; Alberto Vecchietti
- Starring: Claudio Villa; Maria Fiore; Walter Santesso
- Cinematography: Sergio Pesce
- Music by: Carlo Innocenzi
- Production company: Trio Film
- Distributed by: Variety Distribution
- Release date: 1954
- Country: Italy
- Language: Italian

Love Song (Italian: Canzone d'amore) is a 1954 Italian musical film directed by Giorgio Simonelli and starring Claudio Villa, Maria Fiore and Walter Santesso.

The film's sets were designed by the art director Saverio D'Eugenio.

== Cast ==
- Claudio Villa as Sandro
- Maria Fiore as Lidia
- Bruna Corrà as Ada
- Walter Santesso as Mario
- Silvio Noto
- Beniamino Maggio
- Maria Laura Rocca
- Alberto Talegalli
- Maria Zanoli
- Giulio Battiferri
- Aristide Catani
- Milvia Chianelli
- Rosetta D'Este
- Cesare Fantoni
- Armando Furlai
- Ettore Jannetti
- Gianni Luda
- Vittoria Mongardi
- Cristina Pall
- Mario Passante
- Emilia Ristori
- Rita Simoni

== Bibliography ==
- Chiti, Roberto & Poppi, Roberto. Dizionario del cinema italiano: Dal 1945 al 1959. Gremese Editore, 1991.
