= Irene Cefaro =

Italian stage and film actress (1935–2023)

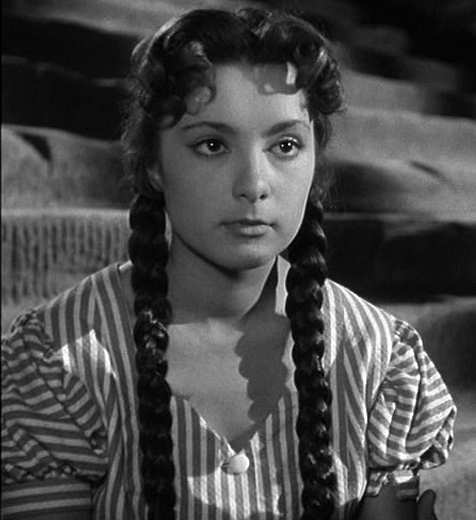
- Cefaro in the movie Chronicle of Poor Lovers (1954)
- Born: 31 August 1935; Rome, Italy
- Died: 20 November 2013 (aged 78); Rome, Italy
- Occupation: Actress
- Years active: 1954–1959

Irene Cefaro (31 August 1935 – 20 November 2013) was an Italian stage and film actress.

== Life and career ==
Born in Rome, in 1952, Cefaro won the beauty contest "Miss Roma" and almost immediately attracted the interest of film producers, making her film debut in Il maestro di Don Giovanni (1953). In a few years, she got notable roles in films of value directed by Federico Fellini, Carlo Lizzani, Giuseppe De Santis, Luigi Comencini and Raffaello Matarazzo, among others. She prematurely retired from acting in the late 1950s to devote herself to her family. Cefaro died in Rome on 20 November 2013, at the age of 78.

== Selected filmography ==
- Guai ai vinti (1954)
- Chronicle of Poor Lovers (1955)
- Bravissimo (1955)
- Destination Piovarolo (1955)
- Il Bidone (1955)
- The Wolves (1956)
- Husbands in the City (1957)
- L'amore più bello (1958)
- Le donne ci tengono assai (1959)
