= Nicola Manzari =

Italian screenwriter (1908–1991)

- Born: 14 November 1908; Bari, Italy
- Died: 28 April 1991 (aged 82); Rome, Italy
- Occupation: Screenwriter
- Years active: 1940–1975

Nicola Manzari (14 November 1908 – 28 April 1991) was an Italian screenwriter and director. He wrote for 38 films between 1940 and 1975.

== Selected filmography ==
- Fourth Page (1942)
- The Adventures of Fra Diavolo (1942)
- Chains (1949)
- Hearts at Sea (1950)
- Women and Brigands (1950)
- Cameriera bella presenza offresi... (1951)
- The Last Sentence (1951)
- I morti non pagano tasse (1952)
- Non è vero... ma ci credo (1953)
- Frine, Courtesan of Orient (1953)
- Lulu (1953)
- Papà Pacifico (1954)
- Love Song (1954)
- Le ambiziose (1961)
- Mafia Connection (1970)
