= Lia Di Leo =

Italian actress (1923–2022)

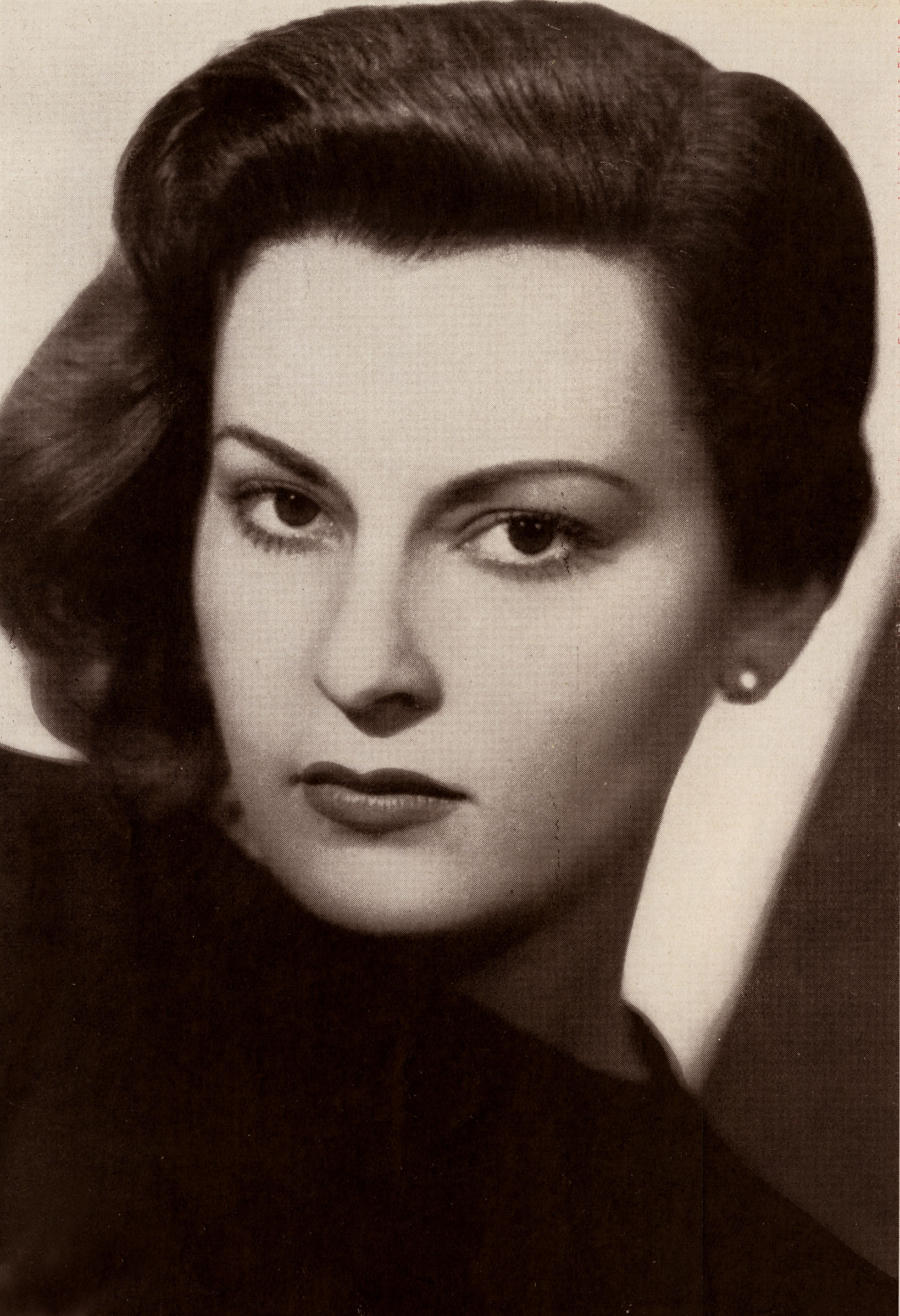
- Lia Di Leo in Radiocorriere magazine, 1953.
- Born: 22 July 1923; Taranto, Apulia, Italy
- Died: 15 December 2006 (aged 83); Palm Springs, California, U.S.
- Other name: Alberta Alda Di Leo
- Occupation: Actress
- Years active: 1951-1957 (films)

Lia Anna Di Leo (22 July 1923 – 15 December 2006) was an Italian actress and model. She entered the 1951 Miss Italy contest and then began acting in films, generally playing glamorous supporting roles.

Di Leo's parents died while she was very young, and as a result she raised her two younger twin brothers, Francesco and Antonio, with her older brother Mario. After marrying in 1957 she retired from the screen and moved to the United States, where she worked as a sculptor. She died in Palm Springs, California on 15 December 2006, at the age of 83.

== Filmography ==
Year	Title	Role	Notes
1951	Quo Vadis	Pedicurist	Uncredited
1951	Lorenzaccio	Una corteggiana	
1952	The Black Mask	Hippolite	
1952	The Moment of Truth	Madame Meunier	
1952	The Tired Outlaw	Carmen	
1952	The Piano Tuner Has Arrived	Cameriera	
1953	I Chose Love	Paola	
1953	The Return of Don Camillo	La maestrina	
1953	The Earrings of Madame de…	Lola	
1953	Empty Eyes	Gina, Fernando's wife	
1954	Mizar (Sabotaggio in mare)	Fatma	
1954	Cose da pazzi	The Nurse	
1955	Tower of Lust	Princesse Blanche	
1955	Sins of Casanova	Baroness Donna Lucrezia	
1955	Io sono la Primula Rossa		
1956	Wives and Obscurities	Gemma	
1956	Occhi senza luce	Lea	(final film role)

== Bibliography ==
- Claudio G. Fava. Alberto Sordi. Gremese Editore, 2003.
