= Gold of Rome =

1961 Italian war drama film by Carlo Lizzani

- Directed by: Carlo Lizzani
- Cinematography: Erico Menczer
- Edited by: Franco Fraticelli
- Music by: Giovanni Fusco
- Release date: 1961

L'oro di Roma (internationally released as Gold of Rome) is a 1961 Italian war - drama film directed by Carlo Lizzani. The film is based on actual events surrounding the Nazi's raid of Rome's Jewish ghetto in October 1943.

== Plot ==
After the Italian armistice, the Germans occupy Rome; in October 1943, the German police commander calls the president of the Jewish community before him and orders him to deliver 50 kilograms of gold within two days, otherwise he will take 200 heads of families hostage. The community is divided between those who decide to give in to the blackmail and hand over what little gold they have left and those who do not believe in the Germans' word. The Jews remaining in the ghetto are impoverished by the Italian racial laws and with enormous difficulty try to come up with the imposed amount.

The president of the community does what he can to ask for aid, distressed and uncertain that the delivery will really help save lives. A group of boys arms themselves to rebel, headed by young shoemaker David. His decision not to deliver the gold and oppose Nazi power leads him to clash with most members of the community and the precept of refusing violence. Giulia, a former classmate of David's Israelite school, at first appears to be able to escape racial segregation, thanks to her requited love for Maximus, a Catholic medical student. Determined to marry, Julia is baptized, divided in her love for her roots. In fact, when despite the successful delivery of the 50 kilos of gold, the Germans round up Jews all over Rome, taking away men, women, the sick and children, she voluntarily surrenders herself into the hands of the Germans, to follow her father and his people.

== Cast ==
- Gérard Blain: Davide
- Anna Maria Ferrero: Giulia
- Jean Sorel: Massimo
- Andrea Checchi: Ortona
- Paola Borboni: Rosa
- Umberto Raho: Beniamino
- Filippo Scelzo: Ludovico
