= Farewell, My Beautiful Lady =

- Directed by: Fernando Cerchio
- Written by: Leonardo Benvenuti; Fernando Cerchio; Ottavio Poggi
- Produced by: Ottavio Poggi
- Starring: Gino Cervi; Alba Arnova; Armando Francioli
- Cinematography: Vincenzo Seratrice
- Edited by: Antonietta Zita
- Music by: Franco D'Achiardi
- Production company: Gladio Film
- Distributed by: Gladio Film
- Release date: 1954
- Running time: 95 minutes
- Country: Italy
- Language: Italian

Farewell, My Beautiful Lady (Italian: Addio mia bella signora) is a 1954 Italian historical melodrama film directed by Fernando Cerchio and starring Gino Cervi, Alba Arnova and Armando Francioli. It presents a love triangle between a Colonel of the Bersaglieri, his wife and his young student set against the backdrop of Italy's entry into the First World War in 1915.

== Cast ==
- Gino Cervi as Conte Riccardo Salluzzo
- Alba Arnova as Cristina
- Armando Francioli as Guido
- Laura Gore as Clara
- Silvio Bagolini as Ercole
- Maria Zanoli as La governante
- Luigi Pavese as Giuseppe
- Franco Fabrizi as Marco
- Giacomo Rondinella as himself
- Sergio Bergonzelli as The Student
- Graziella De Roc as Cristina's Maidservant

== Bibliography ==
- Chiti, Roberto & Poppi, Roberto. Dizionario del cinema italiano: Dal 1945 al 1959. Gremese Editore, 1991.
