= Emanuele Luzzati =

Italian painter, animator and filmmaker (1921-2007)

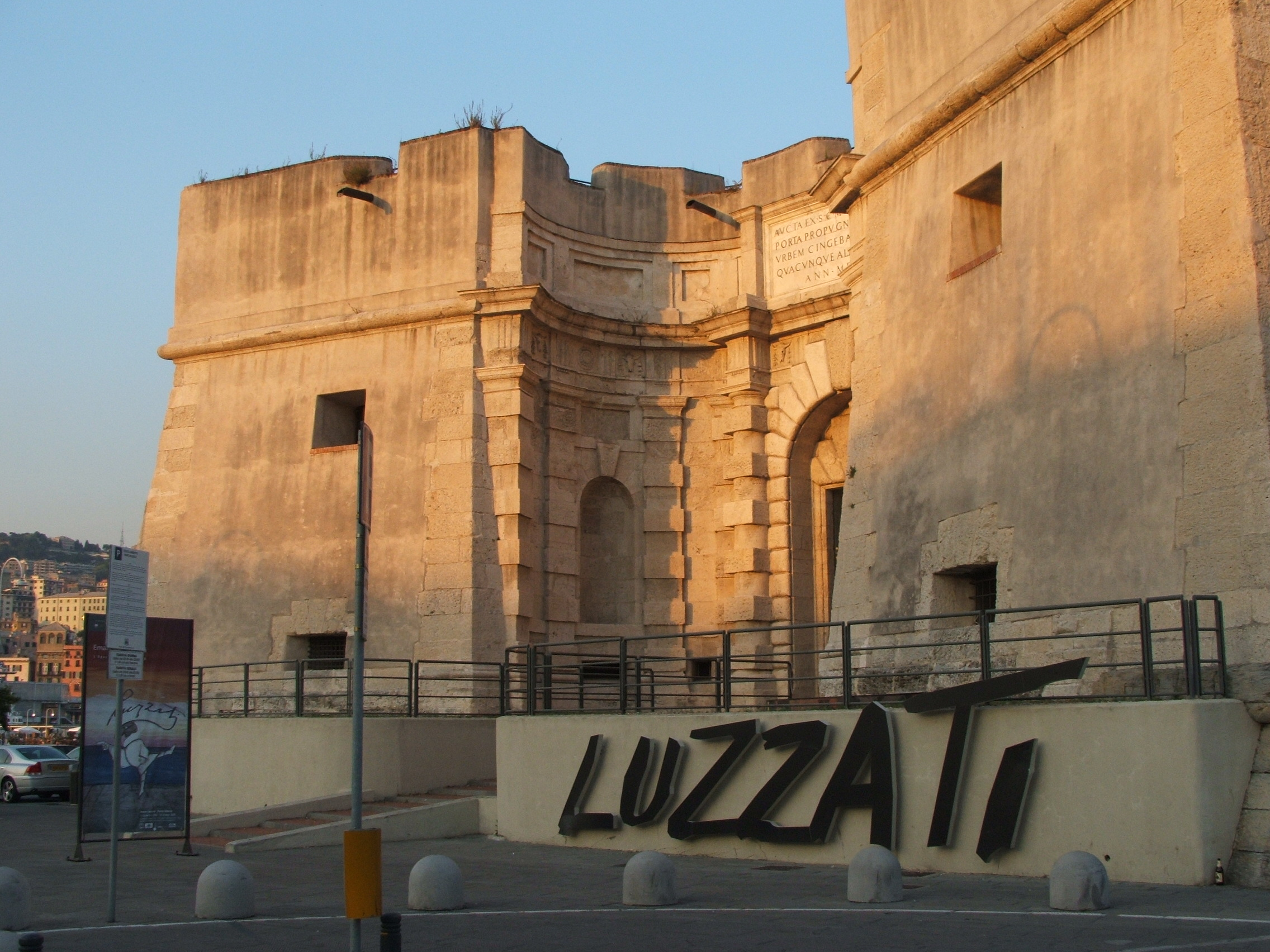
The Luzzati Porta Siberia, a museum dedicated to displaying Luzzati's art that was open from 2008 to 2019

Emanuele Luzzati (3 June 1921 – 26 January 2007) was an Italian painter, production designer, illustrator, film director and animator. He was nominated for Academy Awards for two of his short films, La gazza ladra (The Thieving Magpie) (1964) and Pulcinella (1973).

== Biography ==
Luzzati was born in Genoa in 1921, and turned to drawing in 1938 when his academic studies were interrupted by the introduction of the racial laws of Fascist Italy, as he was the son of a Jewish father. He moved to Switzerland with his family and studied in Lausanne, where he obtained his degree at the local École des Beaux-Arts. He designed his first production of Solomon and the Queen of Sheba in 1944, a collaboration with his friends Alessandro Fersen, Aldo Trionfo and Guido Lopez. He returned to Italy after the war.

His first work as an animator was the short film I paladini di Francia, together with Giulio Gianini, in 1960. He continued to collaborate with Gianini for later projects, including Castello di carte in 1962, Alì Babà, and Turandot. Two of Luzzati's and Gianini's works, La gazza ladra and Pulchinella, were both nominated for an Oscar for Best Animated Short Film in 1965 and 1974 respectively.

Luzzati provided designs for the London Festival Ballet, the Chicago Opera House, the Vienna Staatsoper and the Glyndebourne Festival, including several Mozart productions and Verdi's Macbeth produced by Michael Hadjimischev in 1972.

He has also worked in children's illustration, producing several works for which he also wrote the literary text (Tarantella di Pulcinella, I tre fratelli) and illustrating the Italian fairy tales of Italo Calvino and texts and nursery rhymes by Gianni Rodari. In 1976, he illustrated Dodici Cenerentole in cerca d'autore by Rita Cirio, from which Gennaro Vitiello drew inspiration for the show La storia di Cenerentola à la manière de....

Luzzati also designed the logo for the Palio di Asti. He has created the banners presented to the Collegiata di San Secondo and to the winner of the race in 1983 and 2005.

A museum bearing his name, the Luzzati Porta Siberia, was opened in the old port of Genoa in June 2008. It closed in 2019 due to a lack of funds.

Luzzati died in Genoa on 26 January 2007, aged 85.

== Works in English ==
=== Books in English ===
- Chichibio and the crane, New York, Obelensky, 1962
- Ronald and the wizard Calico, New York, Pantheon, 1969, and London, Hutchinson, 1969
- Ali Baba and the forty thieves, New York, Pantheon, 1969
- When it rains...it rains, New York, Rinehart & Winston, 1970 (text by Bill Martin jr.)
- Whistle, Mary, Whistle, New York, Rinehart & Winston, 1970 (text by Bill Martin jr.)
- The magic flute, Oxford, Blackwell, 1971
- The travels of Marco Polo, London, Dent, 1975
- Walking and talking with Yoav, Tel Aviv, Sifriat Poalim, 1976 (text by Michal Snunit)
- Cinderella, London, Bluth, 1981
- Michael and the monster of Jerusalem, Jerusalem, Tower of David Museum, 1989 (text by Meir Shalev)
- A Snake, A Flood, A Hidden Baby, Kalaniot Books, 2021 (text by Meir Shalev, English translation by Ilana Kurshan)

=== Stage designs in English-speaking countries ===
- The Magic Flute, Glyndebourne Festival Opera, 1963
- Macbeth, Glyndebourne Festival Opera, 1964
- Carmina Burana, Chicago Lyric Opera, 1965
- L'heure espagnole, Chicago Lyric Opera, 1965
- A Midsummer Night's Dream, English Opera Group, 1967
- Don Giovanni, Glyndebourne Festival Opera, 1967
- Die Entführung aus dem Serail, Glyndebourne Festival Opera, 1968
- Le Rossignol, Chicago Lyric Opera, 1968
- Così fan tutte, Glyndebourne Festival Opera, 1969
- Sette canzoni by Gian Francesco Malipiero, Edinburgh International Festival, 1969
- El Amor Brujo, Chicago Lyric Opera, 1969
- La Cenerentola, Scottish Opera, 1969
- Il Turco in Italia, Glyndebourne Festival Opera, 1970
- Don Quixote, London Festival Ballet, 1970
- L'Italiana in Algeri, Chicago Lyric Opera, 1970
- Il mercato di Malmantile by Domenico Cimarosa, Lincoln Center, 1974
- Oberon, Opera Theater of Saint Louis, 1988
- Candide, Opera Theater of Saint Louis, 1994
