= My Life Is Yours =

1954 film

- Directed by: Giuseppe Masini
- Written by: Siro Angeli; Ugo Guerra; Giuseppe Masini; Luigi Nannerini
- Starring: Armando Francioli; Patricia Roc; Alba Arnova
- Cinematography: Carlo Fiore
- Edited by: Otello Colangeli
- Music by: Carlo Innocenzi
- Production company: Borea Film
- Release date: 1954
- Country: Italy
- Language: Italian

My Life Is Yours (Italian: La mia vita è tua) is a 1954 Italian melodrama film directed by Giuseppe Masini and starring Armando Francioli and Patricia Roc.

== Cast ==
- Armando Francioli as Marco Ridolfi
- Patricia Roc as Laura
- Alba Arnova as Silvia
- Lucien Gallas as Don Antonio
- Achille Togliani
- Mino Doro as Il medico
- Roberto Bruni
- Giulio Calì
- Gemma Bolognesi
- Nietta Zocchi
- Renato Chiantoni
- Fedele Gentile
- Maria Grazia Monaci
- Cesare Sindaci
- Franco Franchi
- Sandro Pistolini

== Bibliography ==
- Hodgson, Michael. Patricia Roc. 2013.
