= Aldo Trionfo =

Italian theatre director (1921–1989)

- Born: 12 December 1921; Genoa, Italy
- Died: 6 February 1989 (aged 67); Genoa, Italy
- Occupation: theatre director

Aldo Trionfo (12 December 1921 – 6 February 1989) was an Italian theatre director.

== Life and career ==
Born in Genoa into a Jewish family, during the war years Trionfo was forced to escape to Lausanne where he graduated in Engineering, started practicing as a mime and became friends with Emanuele Luzzati and Alessandro Fersen. Between 1947 and 1953 he worked as an actor, set designer and costume designer in the stage company "Il carrozzone". Trionfo first became well known for the Avant-garde theatre "La borsa d'Arlecchino", which he founded in 1957 in his hometown. He was the artistic director of the Teatro Stabile in Turin between 1972 and 1976, and he directed the drama school Silvio d’Amico Academy of Dramatic Arts from 1980 to 1986. The World Encyclopedia of Contemporary Theatre wrote about his art: "Trionfo made a name for himself by extending the limits of classical and modern plays using the exaltation of crude and grotesque intonations".
