= Lulu (1953 film) =

1953 film

- Directed by: Fernando Cerchio
- Written by: Carlo Bertolazzi; Fernando Cerchio; Mario Corsi; Nicola Manzari; Ottavio Poggi
- Produced by: Ottavio Poggi
- Starring: Valentina Cortese
- Cinematography: Mario Albertelli; Vincenzo Seratrice
- Edited by: Antonietta Zita
- Release date: 1953
- Running time: 90 minutes
- Country: Italy
- Language: Italian

Lulu (Italian: Lulù) is a 1953 Italian drama film directed by Fernando Cerchio.

== Plot ==
Mario, a student from a noble Milanese family, falls in love with Lulù, a young slender girl. While the student is at Lulu's house, her protector arrives and gives him the keys to the apartment. Mario, who had naively believed in Lulu's good faith, leaves the house upset. When she returns after some time, he no longer finds her, who has left the apartment and returned to live with her parents, people of questionable principles, who suggest their daughter pretend to be pregnant. Mario, feeling responsible, marries Lulu against the wishes of his family and continues his studies in Milan, finding accommodation in the countryside in a house left by his grandmother. Lulu begins to find country life boring and resumes an old relationship. When Mario is warned by an anonymous letter, he rushes home and surprises Lulu with her lover. The latter, threatened by Mario, shoots at him, but hits Lulu instead, who stood between the two.

== Cast ==
- Valentina Cortese - Lulù
- Jacques Sernas - Mario
- Luigi Pavese - Stefano
- Marcello Mastroianni - Soletti
- Paola Borboni - Virginia
- Luigi Cimara - Farnesi
- Mario Ferrari - Mister Franchi
- Flora Mariel - Teresa
- Anna Maria Padoan - Giustina
- Umberto Onorato - Suitor
- Pina Piovani - Mrs. Salvi
- Laura Gore - The Venetian maid
