= Anna Maria Ferrero =

Italian actress (1935–2018)

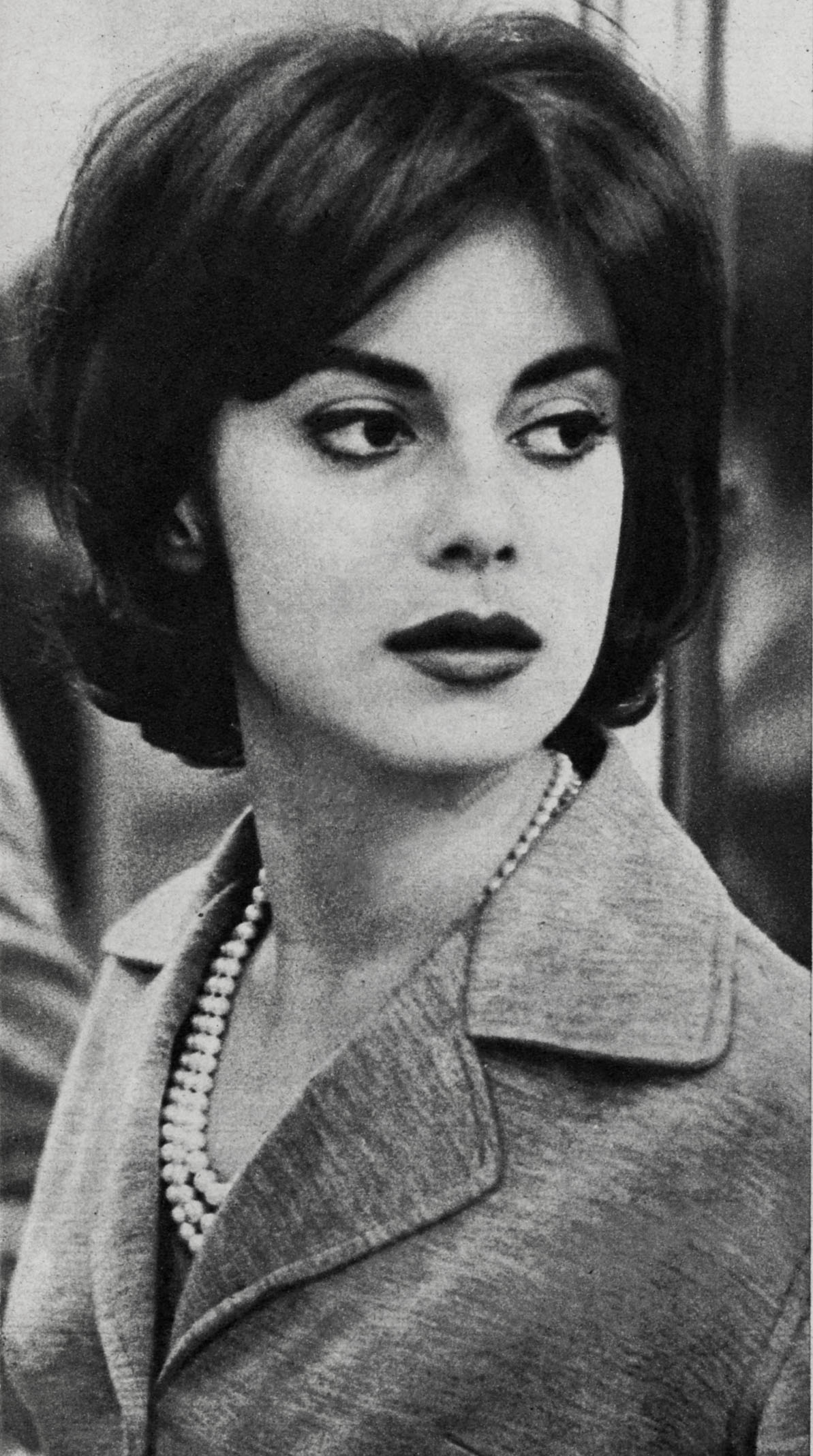
- Ferrero in 1961
- Born: Anna Maria Guerra; 18 February 1935; Rome, Kingdom of Italy
- Died: 21 May 2018 (aged 83); Versailles, France
- Occupation: Actress
- Years active: 1950–1966
- Spouse: Jean Sorel (m. 1962)

Anna Maria Ferrero (18 February 1935 – 21 May 2018) was an Italian actress.

== Early life and career ==
Born Anna Maria Guerra, she changed her last name to Ferrero in honor of the composer Willy Ferrero. Her film debut came at the age of 15 in The Sky Is Red (1950), and she was soon cast in such films as Il conte di Sant'Elmo (1950) and The Forbidden Christ (1951), the only movie directed by the noted writer Curzio Malaparte.

== Later career ==
Ferrero's career progressed quickly as she worked with prominent directors, such as Michelangelo Antonioni on I vinti, and actors, like Marcello Mastroianni in Carlo Lizzani's award-winning Chronicle of Poor Lovers (1953). She appeared with the popular comedian Totò in Totò e Carolina (1953) and with star Alberto Sordi in Una parigina a Roma (1954).

She appeared with Vittorio Gassman in six films: Lorenzaccio, King Vidor's War and Peace, Kean, which Gassman co-directed, Giovanni dalle bande nere, Le sorprese dell'amore, and Il mattatore.

Her last on-screen appearance was as a housewife who accidentally ingests cocaine in a comic episode of the anthology film Controsesso (1964), directed by Franco Rossi.

== Personal life ==
Ferrero chose to end her career shortly after her 1963 marriage to French actor Jean Sorel, her co-star in two films: Gold of Rome (1961) and Four Days in Naples (1962).

== Filmography ==
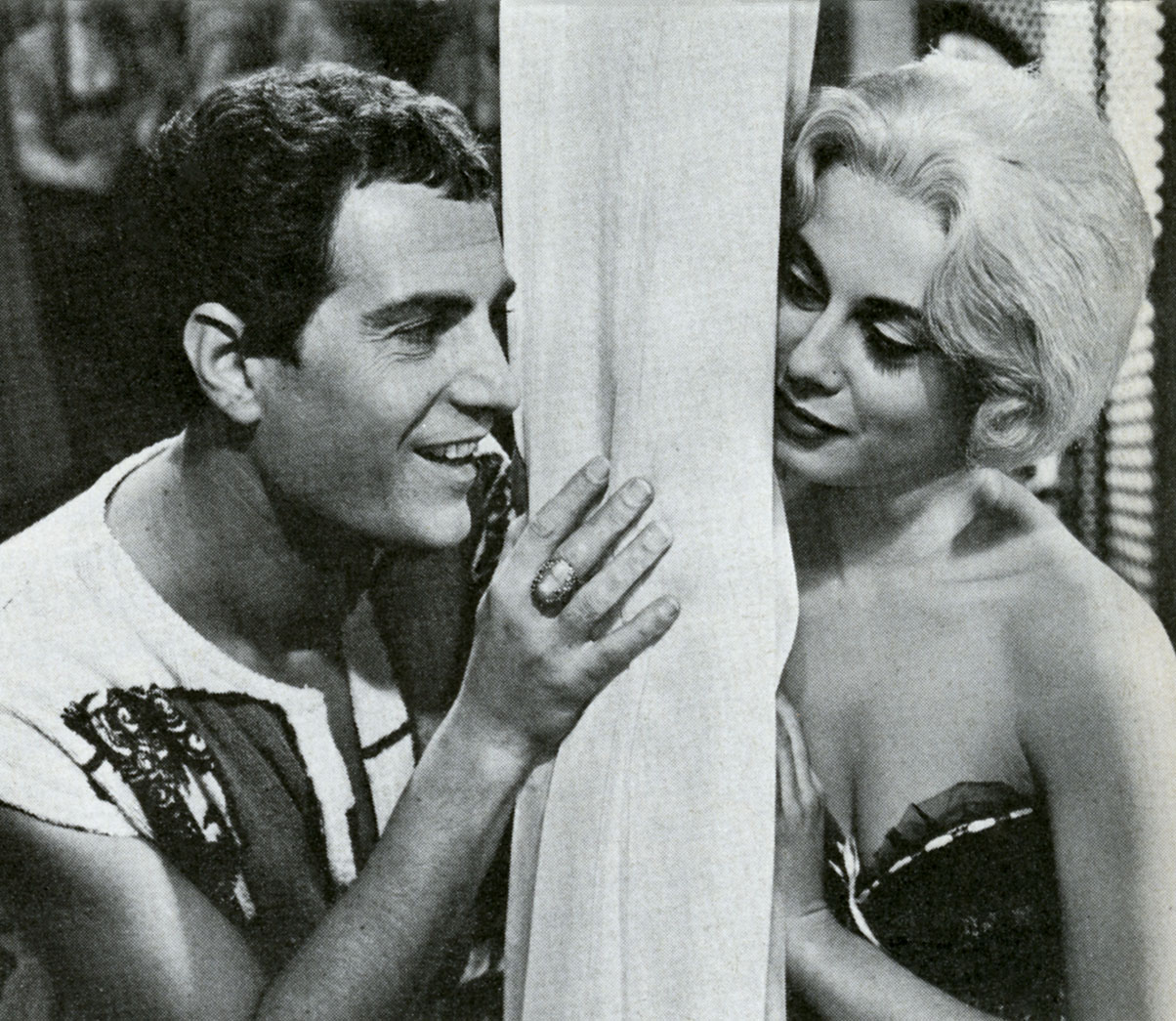
Nino Manfredi and Ferrero in The Employee (1960)

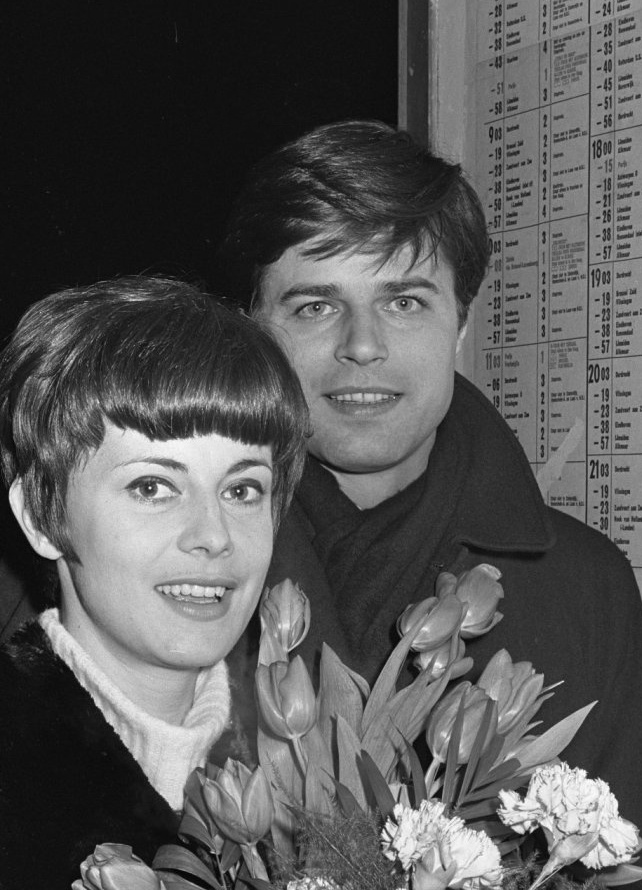
Ferrero and Jean Sorel in 1966

- The Sky Is Red (Il Cielo è rosso) (1950) as Giulia
- Tomorrow Is Another Day (1951) as Giulia
- The Forbidden Christ (Il Cristo proibito) (1951) as Maria
- Lorenzaccio (1951) as Luisa Strozzi
- The Temptress (Le due verità) (1952) as Maria-Luce Carlinet
- Finishing School (Fanciulle di lusso) (1953) as Valerie De Beranger
- Ragazze da marito (1952) as Anna Maria Mazzillo
- Poppy (Lo sai che i papaveri) (1952) as Pierina Zacchi
- The Mute of Portici (La Muta di Portici) (1952) as uncredited
- Half a Century of Song (Canzoni di mezzo secolo) (1952) as cameo
- The Unfaithfuls (Le infedeli) (1953) as Cesarina
- Siamo tutti inquilini (1953) as Anna Perrini
- Eager to Live (Febbre di vivere) (1953) as Elena
- Youth and Perversion (I vinti) (1953) as Marina
- Neapolitans in Milan (Napoletani a Milano) (1953) as Nannina
- Captain Phantom (Capitan Fantasma) (1953) (uncredited)
- It Happened in the Park (1953) as Anna Maria Del Balzo (segment: Pi-greco)
- Verdi, the King of Melody (Giuseppe Verdi) (1953) as Margherita Barezzi Verdi
- Viva la rivista! (1953) as episode
- The Count of Saint Elmo (il Conte di Sant'Elmo) (1953) as Laura Cassano
- Chronicle of Poor Lovers (Cronache di poveri amanti) (1954) as Gesuina
- Guai ai vinti (1954) as Clara
- A Parisian in Rome (1954) as Fiorella
- Toto and Carolina (Totò e Carolina) (1955) as Carolina De Vico
- The Widow (La vedova X) (1955) as Adriana
- The golden falcon (Il falco d'oro) (1955) as Fiammetta
- Songs of Italy (1955) as episode
- War and Peace (1956) as Mary Bolkonsky
- The Violent Patriot (Giovanni dalle bande nere) (1956) as Anna, peasant girl
- The Rival (La rivale) (1955) as Barbara Candi
- Supreme Confession (Suprema confessione) (1956) as Giovanna Siri
- Cime tempestose (1956, TV Mini-Series) as Catherina
- Kean: Genius or Scoundrel (Kean) (1956) as Anna Damby
- Desert Warrior (Los amantes del desierto) (1957) as uncredited
- Captain Falcon (Capitan Fuoco) (1958) as Anna
- Questa mia donna (1958, TV Movie) as Maria Luisa
- Bad Girls Don't Cry (la notte brava) (1959) as Nicoletta
- Surprise of Love (Le sorprese dell'amore) (1959) as Mariarosa
- The Employee (L'impiegato) (1960) as Joan
- Gastone (1960) as Nannina
- Love and Larceny (il mattatore) (1960) as Annalisa Rauseo
- Austerlitz (Austerlitz) (1960) as Elisa Bonaparte
- Culpables (1960) as Margarita
- Silver Spoon Set (I delfini) (1960) as Marina Castelfranco
- The Hunchback of Rome (Il gobbo) (1960) as Ninetta
- Captain Fracasse (Le Capitaine Fracasse) (1961) as Marquise des Bruyères
- A Day for Lionhearts (Un giorno da leoni) (1961) as Ida
- Gold of Rome (L'oro di Roma) (1961) as Giulia
- Always on Sunday (Una domenica d'estate) (1962) as Milena
- The Four Days of Naples (Le quattro giornate di Napoli) (1962) as uncredited
- Un marito in condominio (1963) as Giuliana
- Countersex (Controsesso) (1964) as Marcella (segment "Cocaina di domenica") (final film role)
