= The Sky Is Red =

- Directed by: Claudio Gora
- Written by: Cesare Zavattini; Claudio Gora; Leopoldo Trieste; Lamberto Santilli
- Music by: Valentino Bucchi
- Release date: 1950
- Country: Italy
- Language: Italian

The Sky Is Red (Italian: Il cielo è rosso) is a 1950 Italian drama film. It is the directorial debut of Claudio Gora and it is based on the novel with the same name by Giuseppe Berto, depicting the struggle for survival of a group of boys and girls in a bombed-out town in Italy during World War II.

It was shown as part of a retrospective "Questi fantasmi: Cinema italiano ritrovato" at the 65th Venice International Film Festival.

== Cast ==
- Jacques Sernas: Tullio
- Marina Berti: Carla
- Mischa Auer Jr.: Daniele
- Anna Maria Ferrero: Giulia
- Lauro Gazzolo: calzolaio
- Liliana Tellini: Nora
- Amedeo Trilli
