= Alberto Talegalli =

Italian actor (1913–1961)

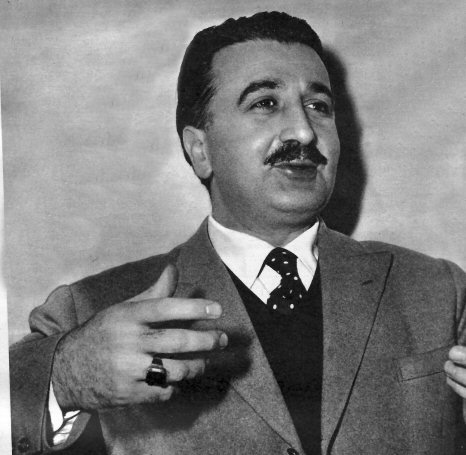
- Born: 2 October 1913; Spoleto, Italy
- Died: 10 July 1961 (aged 47); Gualdo Tadino, Italy
- Occupation: Actor
- Years active: 1952–1961

Alberto Talegalli (2 October 1913 – 10 July 1961) was an Italian film actor. He appeared in 37 films between 1952 and 1961. He was born in Pincano (Spoleto) and died in Gualdo Tadino in the province of Perugia.

== Life and career ==
After graduating from the liceo scientifico Talegalli became a bank clerk and a journalist for RAI television. After moving to Rome to pursue his passion for acting, he got the success thanks to Sor Clemente, a macchietta he created and successfully performed on stage, television, radio and in two comedy films by Camillo Mastrocinque. He died in a car accident, aged 47.

== Selected filmography ==
- Siamo tutti inquilini (1953)
- Two Nights with Cleopatra (1953)
- Angels of Darkness (1954)
- The Country of the Campanelli (1954)
- Laugh! Laugh! Laugh! (1954)
- Love Song (1954)
- Three Strangers in Rome (1958)
- The Friend of the Jaguar (1959)
- Appuntamento a Ischia (1960)
- Who Hesitates is Lost (1960)
