= Guido Salvini (director) =

Italian film director (1893–1965)

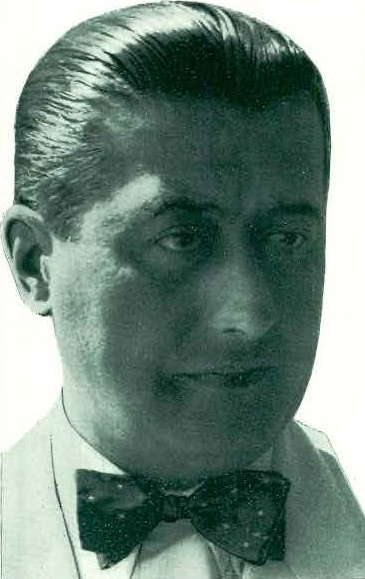
- Salvini in 1940
- Born: 12 May 1893; Florence, Italy
- Died: 4 May 1965 (aged 71); Florence, Italy
- Occupation: Director
- Years active: 1937–1955

Guido Salvini (12 May 1893 – 4 May 1965) was an Italian film director. He directed seven films from 1937 to 1955.

== Filmography ==
Year	Title	Role	Notes
1955	Adriana Lecouvreur		
1955	Il conte Aquila		
1951	Fugitive in Trieste		
