= Fernando Cerchio =

Italian film director

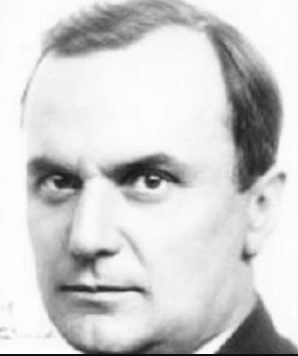
- Born: 7 August 1914; Luserna San Giovanni, Italy
- Died: 19 August 1974 (aged 60); Mentana, Italy
- Occupations: Film director Screenwriter
- Years active: 1940–1972

Fernando Cerchio (7 August 1914 – 19 August 1974) was an Italian film director and screenwriter. He directed more than 30 films between 1940 and 1972.

== Selected filmography ==
- Men of the Mountain (1943)
- Mistress of the Mountains (1950)
- The Crossroads (1951)
- The Tired Outlaw (1952)
- Son of the Hunchback (1952)
- Lulu (1953)
- Farewell, My Beautiful Lady (1954)
- The Count of Bragelonne (1954)
- Desert Warrior (1957)
- The Mysteries of Paris (1957)
- Herod the Great (1958)
- Head of a Tyrant (1959)
- Cleopatra's Daughter (1960)
- Queen of the Nile (1961)
- Invasion 1700 (1962)
- Toto vs. Maciste (1962)
- Toto and Cleopatra (1963)
- Toto vs. the Black Pirate (1964)
- Mutiny at Fort Sharpe (1966)
- Top Secret (1967)
- Il marchio di Kriminal (1967)
