= Love and Larceny (1960 film) =

1960 film by Dino Risi

Il Mattatore
- Directed by: Dino Risi
- Written by: Ettore Scola; Sandro Continenza; Ruggero Maccari; Sergio Pugliese; Age & Scarpelli
- Produced by: Mario Cecchi Gori
- Starring: Vittorio Gassman; Dorian Gray; Peppino De Filippo; Anna Maria Ferrero
- Cinematography: Massimo Dallamano
- Edited by: Eraldo Da Roma
- Music by: Pippo Barzizza
- Release dates: 1959 (Italy); February 1, 1963 (US)
- Running time: 103 minutes
- Country: Italy
- Language: Italian

Love and Larceny (in Italian, Il mattatore, "The Showman") is a 1960 Italian comedy film directed by Dino Risi. It was entered into the 10th Berlin International Film Festival.

== Plot ==
Gerardo is an aspiring actor, trying unsuccessfully to cross over from comedy to tragedy. Due to his ability to mimic dialects of Italy, he is involved in a scam concocted by Lallo against a rich cloth-merchant. His inexperience results in him being the only one to be arrested and sentenced to several months in prison. There he encounters a vast array of petty criminals, devoted primarily to scams of various kinds. He befriends Chinotto, a con man for whom the doors of the prisons are like "revolving doors of a large hotel."

== Cast ==
- Vittorio Gassman as Gerardo Latini
- Peppino De Filippo as De Rosa, aka "Chinotto"
- Dorian Gray as Elena
- Anna Maria Ferrero as Annalisa Rauseo
- Mario Carotenuto as Lallo Cortina
- Alberto Bonucci as Gloria Patri
- Fosco Giachetti as General Benito Mesci
- Luigi Pavese as The industrialist
- Nando Bruno as Owner of restaurant
- Linda Sini as Laura, wife of Chinotto
