= Alessandro Fersen =

Italian dramatist, actor, theater director, author and drama teacher

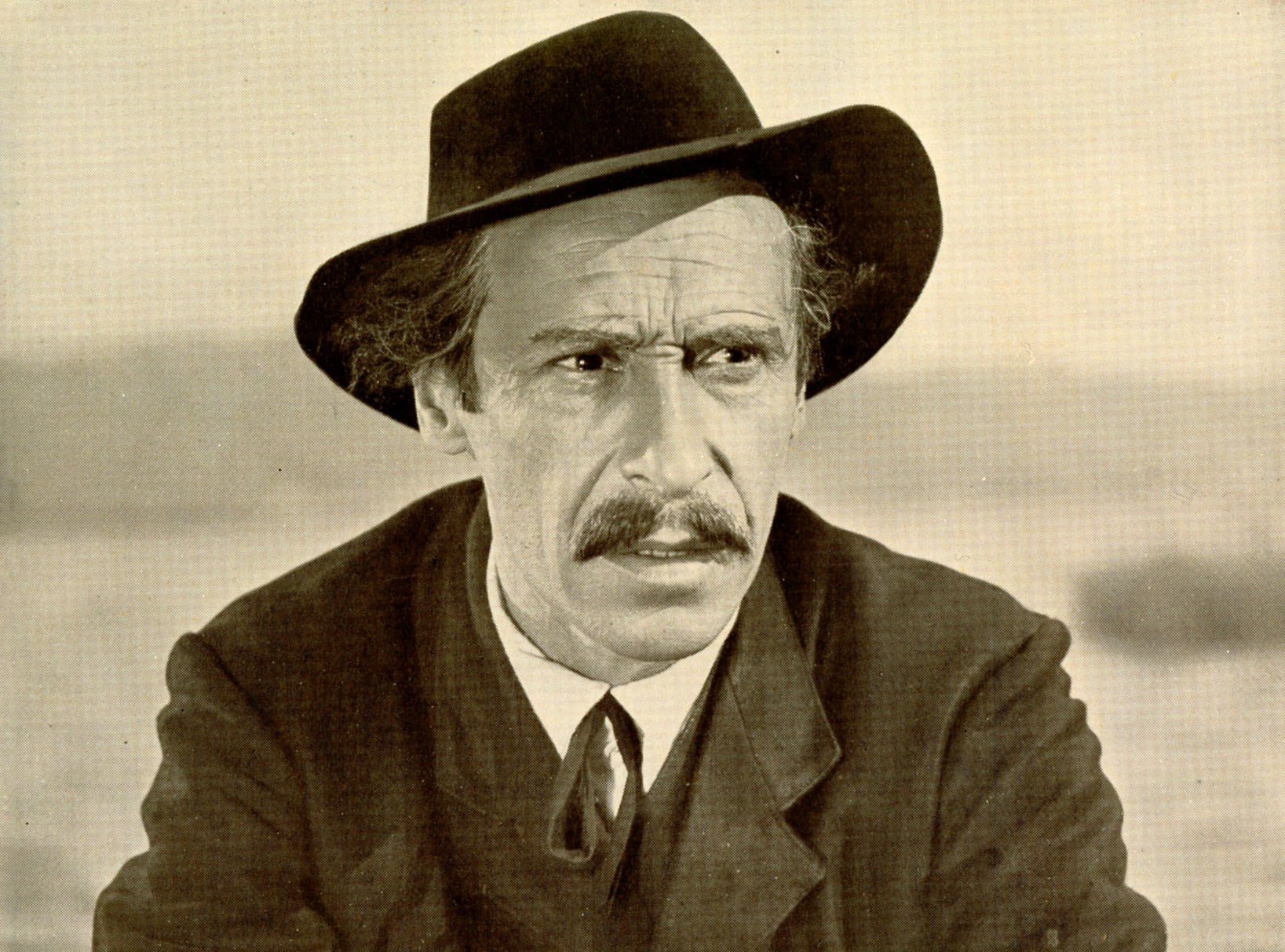
- Born: Aleksander Kazimierz Fajrajzen; 5 December 1911; Łódź, Russian Empire (now Poland)
- Died: 3 October 2001 (aged 89); Rome, Italy
- Occupation: Actor

Alessandro Fersen (born Aleksander Kazimierz Fajrajzen; 5 December 1911 – 3 October 2001) was a Polish-born Italian dramatist, actor, theater director, author and drama teacher. He is considered an influential figure in the 20th-century Italian theatre.

== Life ==
He was born as Aleksander Fajrajzen in Łódź to a Jewish family, that moved to Genoa in 1913. He studied at the University of Genoa under Giuseppe Rensi, graduating in philosophy in 1934 with a thesis later published under the title L'Universo come giuoco ("The Universe as a game"). Due to the racial laws of 1938 he moved to Paris (where he attended the Collège de France) and then in Eastern Europe. Back in Italy in 1943, he participated in the resistance in Liguria, in a partisan group linked to the Italian Socialist Party, before working in Switzerland, where he became friends with Emanuele Luzzati and Giorgio Colli.

He returned to Italy at the end of World War II, and after a period in which he devoted himself to political activity (being a member of the Secretary of the National Liberation Committee of Genoa and Liguria) and journalism (as a collaborator of newspapers Il Lavoro and Corriere del Popolo), in 1947 he began his activity as a theater director with the drama Leah Lebowitz, a play which he had taken from a Hasidic legend; this play started with the artistic collaboration, which will last decades, with Emanuele Luzzati, with whom founded the "Teatro Ebraico" ("Jewish Theatre"), staging dramas written by him such as Golem (1969), inspired by the Yiddish folklore, or Leviathan (1974), based on the techniques of mnemodrama.

From 1947 Fersen worked for more than a decade for the Teatro Stabile in Genoa, directing adaptations of Shakespeare, Pirandello, Molière, Anouilh, among others. In 1957 he began a career as a drama teacher founding an acting school in Rome, the "Studio di arti sceniche", inspired by the Stanislavski's system. He was also an author of critical and theoretical essays, aimed at an interdisciplinary theater, and an actor active on stage, on television and in films.

== Filmography ==
Year	Title	Role	Notes
1942	Un colpo di pistola		Uncredited
1949	The Earth Cries Out	Il rabbino	
1949	The Walls of Malapaga		Uncredited
1950	Il sentiero dell'odio		
1951	Lorenzaccio		
1953	Perdonami!		
1953	Woman of the Red Sea	Prof. Krauss	
1953	Il viale della speranza	Director Gabelli	
1953	Puccini	Padre di Delia	
1953	Condemned to Hang	Cesare Rovelli	
1953	Jealousy	Don Silvio	
1953	Musoduro	Dott. Biondi	
1953	Viva la rivista!		
1954	Delirio		
1954	Theodora, Slave Empress	Metropolita	
1954	Ulysses	Diomede	
1954	The Two Orphans	Michel Gérard - the father	
1954	I cavalieri della regina		
1955	The Lost City	Padre de Rafael	
1955	Le Amiche		Uncredited
1955	Desperate Farewell	Doctor Lena	
1956	La capinera del mulino	Aimone	
1986	Giovanni Senzapensieri	Il Professore	(final film role)
