= Silvio Bagolini =

Italian actor (1914–1976)

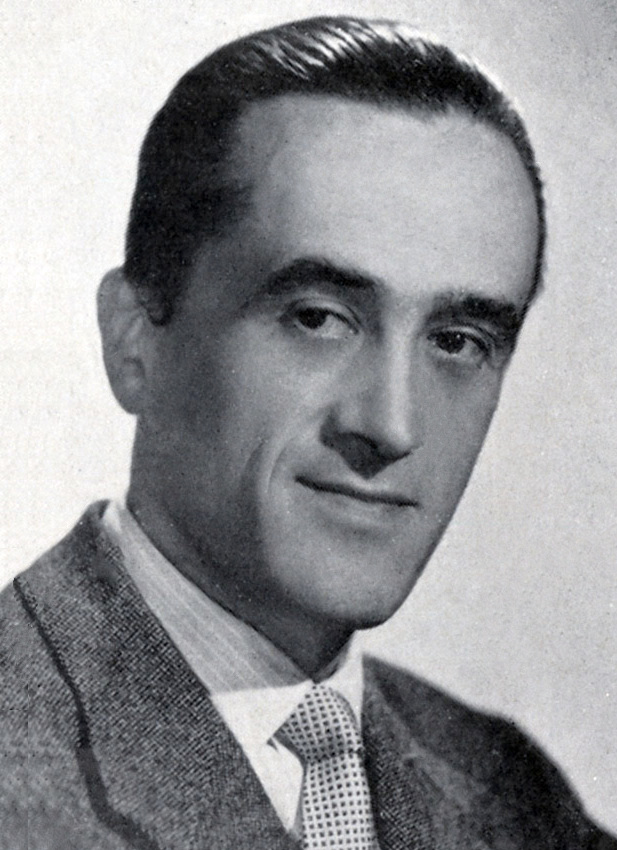
- Born: 4 August 1914; Bologna, Italy
- Died: 26 September 1976 (aged 62)
- Occupation: Actor
- Years active: 1936-1973

Silvio Bagolini (4 August 1914 – 26 September 1976) was an Italian film actor. He appeared in more than 130 films between 1936 and 1973.

== Life and career ==
Born in Bologna, Bagolini studied architecture at the Bologna University, without graduating. He made his acting debut with a leading role in a 1934 experimental amateur film, Verde nei prati. Moved to Rome, he enrolled at the Centro Sperimentale di Cinematografia. In 1936 he made his professional debut in the film La danza delle lancette, and from then he started an intense career as a character actor, often cast in humorous roles. Also active on stage and on television, in the 1970s he abandoned his career to become manager of a spinning mill.

== Selected filmography ==
- Cavalry (1936)
- The Dance of Time (1936)
- The Castiglioni Brothers (1937)
- It Was I! (1937)
- The Former Mattia Pascal (1937)
- Pietro Micca (1938)
- Happy Days (1942)
- The Black Panther (1942)
- The Jester's Supper (1942)
- Apparition (1943)
- Hand of Death (1949)
- Variety Lights (1950)
- Feathers in the Wind (1950)
- Vacation with a Gangster (1951)
- Lorenzaccio (1951)
- Operation Mitra (1951)
- Brief Rapture (1951)
- Cats and Dogs (1952)
- The Tired Outlaw (1952)
- Final Pardon (1952)
- The Overcoat (1952)
- The Piano Tuner Has Arrived (1952)
- Il viale della speranza (1953)
- What Scoundrels Men Are! (1953)
- Farewell, My Beautiful Lady (1954)
- Symphony of Love (1954)
- The Miller's Beautiful Wife (1955)
- Love and Troubles (1958)
- Piece of the Sky (1959)
- The Prisoner of the Iron Mask (1962)
- The Thursday (1963)
- Fantabulous Inc. (1967)
- Killer Caliber .32 (1967)
