= Teatro Eliseo =

Theatre in Rome, Italy

Coordinates: 41.8979°N 12.4886°E

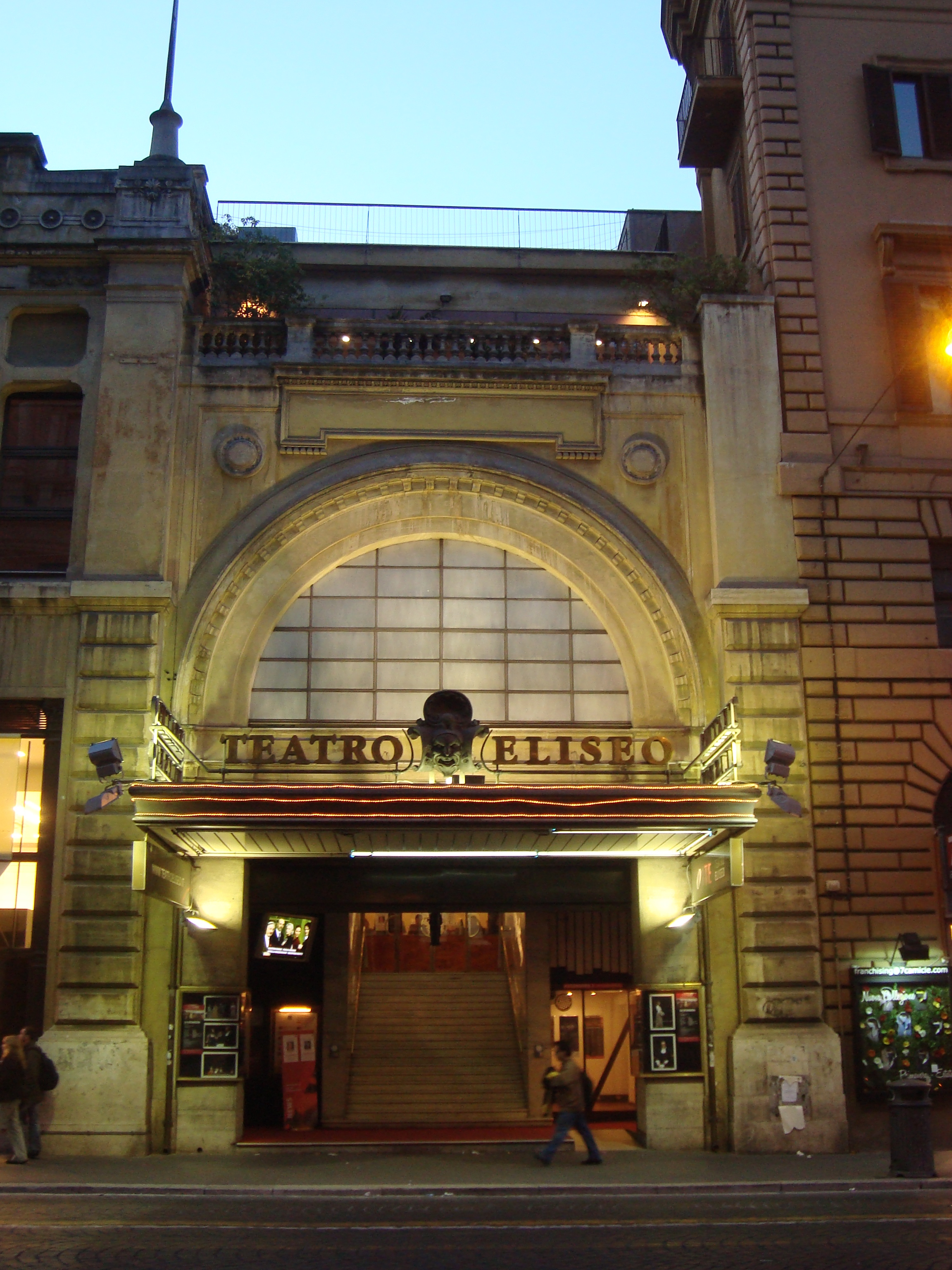
Teatro Eliseo

The Teatro Eliseo (literally "Eliseus Theater") is a theatre located in Rome, Italy.

== History ==
Initially named Arena Nazionale ("National Arena"), the open-air theater was built of wood in 1900. In September 1910, the new "Apollo Theater" built in stone was inaugurated. The artistic program reflected the fashions of the time: operetta and variety shows alternated with opera. Two years later, its ridotto was detached and operated separately as a nightclub. The rest of the theater was renamed into Teatro Cines, a venue for film shows and a few operettas. In 1918, the theater got its present name.

Over the years the theater took on increasing importance, up to undergoing a makeover in 1938 that decreed its current appearance.

In March 2020, the theater was closed. In December 2023, the Lazio Region announced that it would purchase the theater but then the deal was cancelled.
