= Paul Street =

Paul Street may refer to:

- The Paul Street Boys, a 1906 novel by Ferenc Molnár
  - The Boys of Paul Street, 1969 film of the above book

== See also ==
- St. Paul Street (disambiguation), various roads of that name
