= Cardinal Lambertini (play) =

1905 play

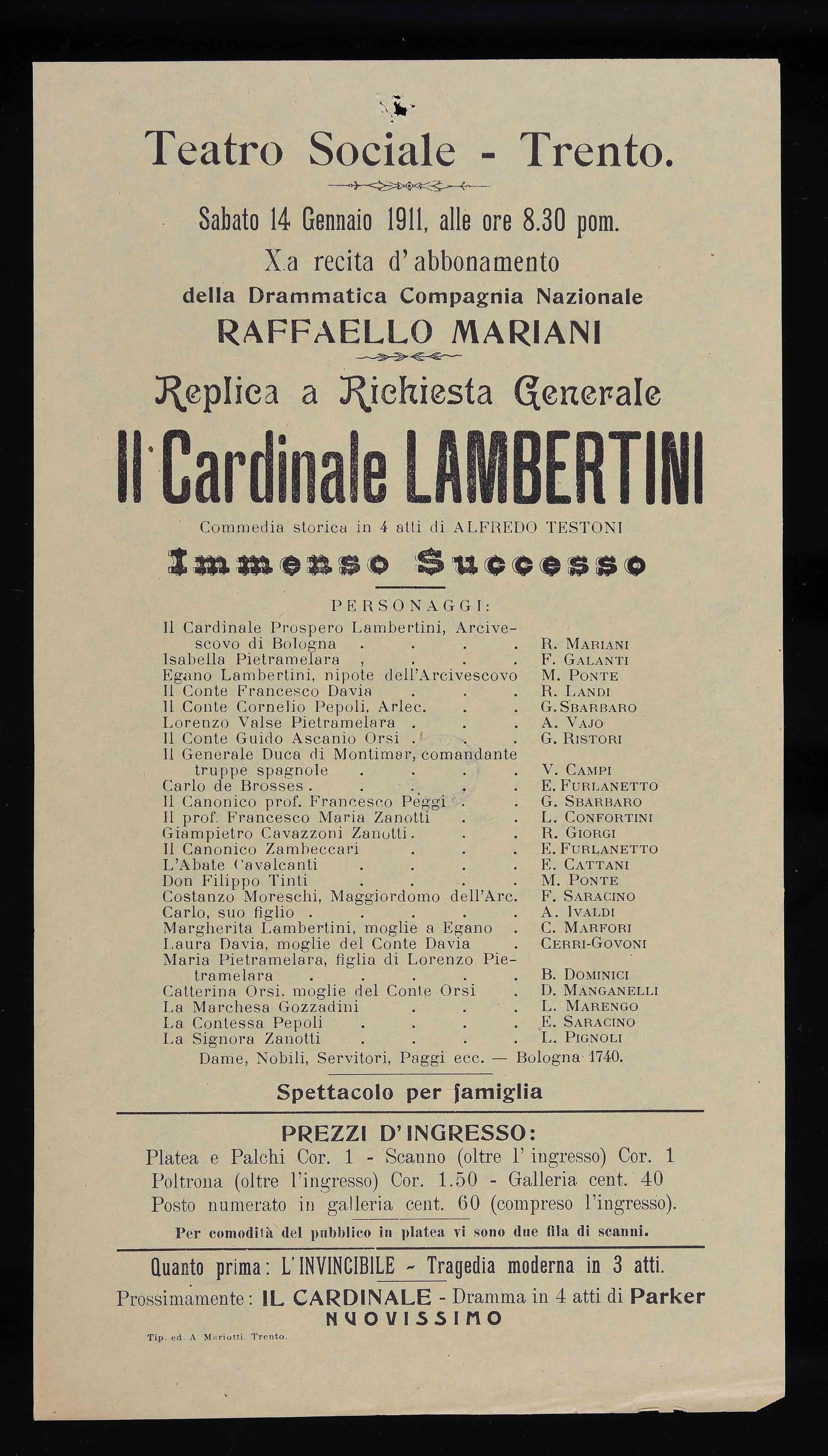
- Written by: Alfredo Testoni
- Original language: Italian
- Genre: Historical comedy
- Setting: Bologna, 1739

Premiere
- Date premiered: 30 October 1905
- Place premiered: Teatro Costanzi, Rome

Cardinal Lambertini (Italian: Il cardinale Lambertini) is an historical comedy play by the Italian writer Alfredo Testoni. It premiered in 1905 at the Teatro Costanzi in Rome. His most successful work, it has been revived numerous times. For many years the title part was closely associated with the actor Ermete Zacconi who originated it.

The play's action takes place in 1739 in Bologna and focuses on the activities of the real Cardinal Lambertini who became Pope Benedict XIV the following year. Bologna was occupied at the time by Bourbon Spanish forces and the Cardinal has to resolve tensions between them and the local nobility who planned to revolt.

== Adaptations ==
It has been made into films on two occasions: a 1934 film Cardinal Lambertini directed by Parsifal Bassi and starring Ermete Zacconi and Isa Miranda and a 1954 film Cardinal Lambertini directed by Giorgio Pastina and starring Gino Cervi and Nadia Gray.

== Bibliography ==
- Goble, Alan. The Complete Index to Literary Sources in Film. Walter de Gruyter, 1999.
