= Summer Rain =

Summer Rain may refer to:

- Rainfall during the summertime season

== Film and theatre ==
- Summer Rain (1937 film), an Italian film directed by Mario Monicelli
- A Summer Rain, a 1978 Brazilian film directed by Carlos Diegues
- Summer Rain (1985 film), a Canadian short drama film directed by François Dauteuil
- Summer Rain (2006 film), directed by Antonio Banderas
- Summer Rain (musical), a 1983 Australian stage musical

== Songs ==
- "Summer Rain" (Belinda Carlisle song), 1990; covered by Slinkee Minx, 2004
- "Summer Rain" (GFriend song), 2017
- "Summer Rain" (Johnny Rivers song), 1967
- "Summer Rain" (Matthew Morrison song), 2011
- "Summer Rain", by Alphaville from The Breathtaking Blue, 1989
- "Summer Rain", by ATB from The DJ 3 in the Mix, 2006
- "Summer Rain", by Sia from This Is Acting, 2016
- "Summer Rain", by U2 from All That You Can't Leave Behind, 2000
- "Summer Rain", by Whitesnake from Good to Be Bad, 2008
- "Summer Rain", by Groove Coverage from 21st Century, 2006

== See also ==
- Summer Rains (disambiguation)
- "Rain in the Summertime", a song by the Alarm
