= The Paul Street Boys =

1906 youth novel by Ferenc Molnár

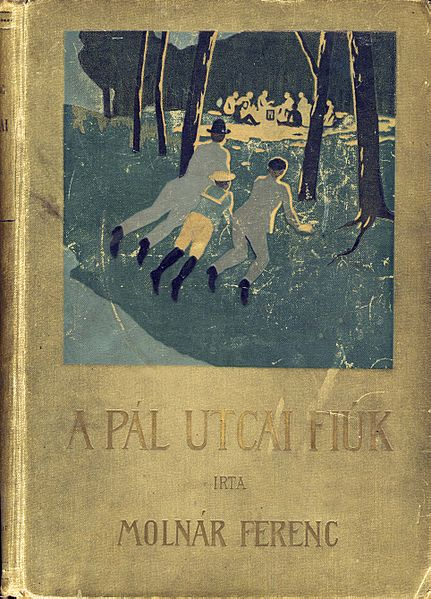
- First edition
- Author: Ferenc Molnár
- Original title: A Pál utcai fiúk
- Language: Hungarian
- Genre: youth novel
- Publication date: 1906
- Publication place: Hungary

The Paul Street Boys (Hungarian: A Pál utcai fiúk) is a youth novel by the Hungarian writer Ferenc Molnár, first published in 1906.

== Plot outline ==
The novel is about schoolboys in the Józsefváros neighbourhood of Budapest and set in 1889. The Paul Street Boys spend their free time at the grund, an empty lot that they regard as their "Fatherland". The story has two main protagonists, Boka (the honourable leader of the Paul Street Boys) and Nemecsek (the smallest member of the group).

When the "Redshirts"—another gang of boys, led by Feri Áts, who gather at the nearby botanical gardens—attempt to take over the grund, the Paul Street Boys are forced to defend themselves in military fashion.

Although the Paul Street Boys win the war, and little Nemecsek repeatedly demonstrates that his bravery and loyalty surpasses his size, the book ends in tragedy: Nemecsek dies of the pneumonia that he caught in the conflict. At the very end of the book, Boka also learns that a tenement building will soon be erected on the grund lot, meaning that the boys' heroic struggle to defend it and Nemecsek's sacrifice were in vain.

== Literary significance and criticism ==
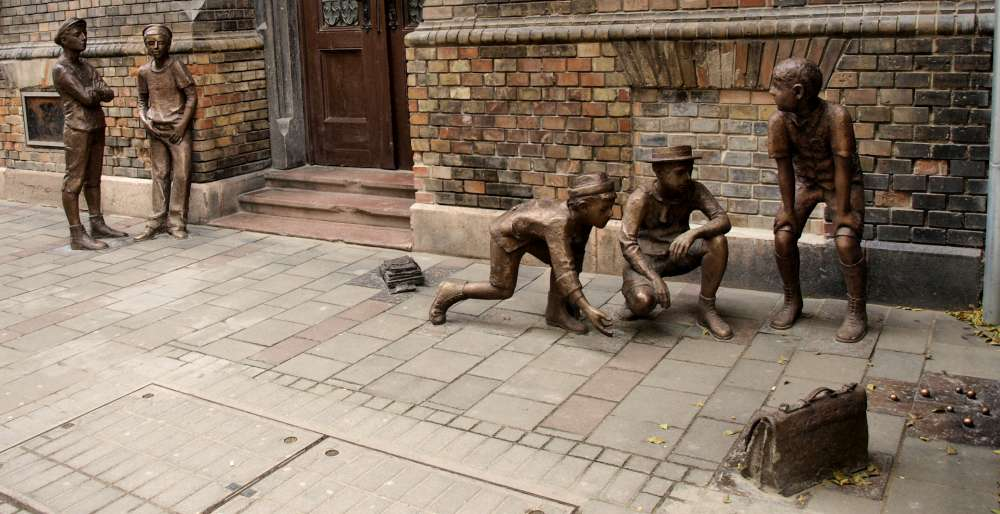
Paul Street Boys sculpture in Budapest, depicting the einstand, a bullying scene from the novel.

Very popular in Hungary, it is considered a classic book, and it is also one of the most famous Hungarian novels outside the country. It has been translated into many languages, and in several countries, it is a mandatory or recommended reading in schools. The first English translation was made by Louis Rittenberg and published in 1927, and later revised by George Szirtes for a re-release in 1994.

Erich Kästner took up the theme of two groups of boys conducting a "war" and using all the terminology of militarism and nationalism in The Flying Classroom, published just before the Nazi Party won elections in Germany. Kästner was, however, less harsh with the character resembling Nemecsek, who in Kästner's version suffers no more than a broken leg.

In Croatia and Serbia, the book is part of book report curriculum, and is very popular among elementary school pupils (a 2016 scholarly poll of 6th and 7th graders in Split found it to be comparable to Harry Potter and Diary of a Wimpy Kid), and there have been multiple translations, the differences between which have attracted some scholarly attention.

In Poland, where the book has been published over 20 times, it is part of the compulsory reading curriculum in primary school, at the stage encompassing grades IV to VIII (pupils between 9 and 15 years of age, depending on the month of birth).

In Israel, the book is considered a classic youth novel. A Hebrew version titled Mahanaim (Camps — also referencing a popular ball game) was published in 1940 and was popular for many years, with multiple reprints. A newer translation titled "The Boys from Paul Street" was published in 1984. A stage adaptation of the book by the Kibbutz theater started performing in 2016.

In Azerbaijan, the book became popular after Ramil Safarov translated it into the Azerbaijani language during his sentence in Budapest.

In Mongolia, the book was published in April 2020 and the Translation team (to Mongolian) was awarded the Hungarian Order of Merit by the decree of the President of Hungary on September 21, 2021.

== Film, TV or theatrical adaptations ==
- A Pál utcai fiúk — silent film (Hungary, 1917), directed by Béla Balogh — First version of the story by Hungarian director Béla Balogh.
- A Pál utcai fiúk — silent film (Hungary, 1924), directed by Béla Balogh, with György Faragó (Nemecsek), Ernő Verebes (Boka), Ferenc Szécsi (Geréb), István Barabás (Feri Áts), Frigyes Pártos (Csónakos). — Second version of the story by Hungarian director Béla Balogh.
- No Greater Glory — film (USA, 1934), directed by Frank Borzage and released by Columbia Pictures, with George P. Breakston (Nemecsek), Jimmy Butler (Boka), Jackie Searl (Geréb), Frankie Darro (Feri Áts), Donald Haines (Csónakos).
- The Paul Street Boys — film (Italy, 1935), directed by Alberto Mondadori and Mario Monicelli, with Giulio Tamagnini (Nemecsek), Alberto Vigevani (Boka), Giulio Macchi (Geréb), Bruno Aghion (Feri Áts), Carlo Cartigliani (Csónakos).
- The Boys of Paul Street — film (Hungary-USA, 1969), directed by Zoltán Fábri, with Anthony Kemp (Nemecsek), William Burleigh (Boka), John Moulder-Brown (Geréb), Julien Holdaway (Feri Áts), Robert Efford (Csónakos). The film was nominated for the Academy Award for Best Foreign Language Film.
- I ragazzi della via Pal — TV film (Italy-Austria-Germany-Hungary, 2003), directed by Maurizio Zaccaro, with Gáspár Mesés (Nemecsek), Gáspár Csaba (Boka), Gergely Mészáros (Geréb), Daniel Lugosi (Feri Áts), Péter Ványi (Csónakos).
- A Pál-utcai fiúk — TV film (Hungary, 2005), directed by Ferenc Török, with Balázs Bojtár (Nemecsek), Krisztián Fekete (Boka), Milán Király (Geréb), Csaba Csuhai Csinos (Feri Áts), Róbert Rostási (Csónakos).

== See also ==
Other European books depicting "war" between rival groups of boys

- The Flying Classroom
- War of the Buttons

Brazilian Band IRA! made reference to this novel in their song "Rua Paulo" from their album entitled "Meninos da Rua Paulo"
