= Cardinal Lambertini (1954 film) =

1954 film

- Directed by: Giorgio Pastina
- Written by: Edoardo Anton; Oreste Biancoli; Giorgio Pastina
- Based on: Cardinal Lambertini by Alfredo Testoni
- Starring: Gino Cervi; Nadia Gray; Arnoldo Foà
- Cinematography: Rodolfo Lombardi
- Edited by: Renato Scandolo
- Music by: Carlo Rustichelli
- Production company: Italica Vox
- Distributed by: Minerva Film
- Release date: 23 December 1954
- Running time: 101 minutes
- Country: Italy
- Language: Italian

Cardinal Lambertini (Italian: Il cardinale Lambertini) is a 1954 Italian historical comedy film directed by Giorgio Pastina and starring Gino Cervi, Nadia Gray and Arnoldo Foà. It is an adaptation of Alfredo Testoni's 1905 play Cardinal Lambertini, which had previously been turned into a 1934 film adaptation.

The film was released by Minerva Film. Interiors were shot at studios in Rome while location shooting took place in Bologna and the small town of Ceri in Lazio. The film's sets were designed by the art director Peppino Piccolo. It earned around 241 million lira at the box office.

== Plot ==
1739. Cardinal Prospero Lambertini, very attentive to the political dynamics in Bologna garrisoned by the Bourbon troops and to the sufferings of the Bolognese, did not hesitate to intervene between the Spaniards and an awkward Bolognese nobility, piloted by Countess Gabriella di Roccasibalda, a casual adventurer, and the people, towards which a massacre disguised as an attempted revolt had been planned, which should have been the casus belli of a repression and the establishment of the gonfalonierate for life of a puppet of the Bourbons.

The cardinal also takes to heart the story of two young lovers who are prevented from getting married, Carlo Barozzi, the son of his lackey, and the stepdaughter of Gabriella di Roccasibalda herself, Countess Maria (daughter of her husband's deceased first wife, Count Goffredo) betrothed by her stepmother to the perfidious Duke of Montimar, also with profound political implications.

== Cast ==
- Gino Cervi as Cardinal Lambertini
- Nadia Gray as Isabella di Pietramelara
- Arnoldo Foà as Duke of Montimar
- Carlo Romano as Goffredo di Pietramelara
- Virna Lisi as Maria di Pietramelara
- Sergio Tofano as Canonico Peggi
- Paolo Carlini as Lawyer Carlo Barozzi
- Gianni Agus as Count Pepoli
- Tino Buazzelli as Count Davia
- Agnese Dubbini as Tata, the maid
- Mario Mazza as Anastasio
- Aldo Fiorelli as Abbot Cavalcanti
- Loris Gizzi as Count Orsi
- Piero Pastore as Papal messenger
- Armando Migliari as Physician
- Mario Siletti as Butler
- Emilio Petacci as Costanzo
- Rita Glori as Marquess Gozzadini

== Bibliography ==
- Chiti, Roberto & Poppi, Roberto. Dizionario del cinema italiano: Dal 1945 al 1959. Gremese Editore, 1991.
- Goble, Alan. The Complete Index to Literary Sources in Film. Walter de Gruyter, 1999.
