= Cardinal Lambertini (1934 film) =

1934 film

- Directed by: Parsifal Bassi
- Written by: Oreste Biancoli; Dino Falconi
- Based on: Cardinal Lambertini by Alfredo Testoni
- Starring: Ermete Zacconi; Isa Miranda; Giulietta De Riso
- Cinematography: Gino Marchi; Otello Martelli
- Edited by: Parsifal Bassi
- Music by: Pietro Clausetti
- Production company: Elios Film
- Distributed by: EFFEBI
- Release date: March 1934
- Running time: 74 minutes
- Country: Italy
- Language: Italian

Cardinal Lambertini (Italian: Il cardinale Lambertini) is a 1934 Italian historical comedy film directed by Parsifal Bassi and starring Ermete Zacconi, Isa Miranda and Giulietta De Riso. It is based on the 1905 play of the same name by Alfredo Testoni, the title role of which Zacconi had played for many years on stage. The film was remade in 1954 starring Gino Cervi.

It was shot at the Bovisa Studios in Milan. The film's sets were designed by the art director Otha Sforza.

== Synopsis ==
Shortly before he became Pope Benedict XIV, Cardinal Lambertini has to mediate between the Spanish forces occupying Bologna and local nobility who bitterly resent them.

== Cast ==
- Ermete Zacconi as Cardinal Lambertini
- Ernes Zacconi as Maria
- Isa Miranda as Anna
- Giulietta De Riso as Isabella Pietramelara
- Franco Becci as Count Davia
- Calisto Bertramo as Pietramelara
- Giuseppe Galeati as Peggi
- Luciano Molinari as Des Brosses
- Aldo Silvani as Carlo
- Letizia Bonini
- Pia De Doses
- Fernanda Fassy
- Maria Wronska

== Bibliography ==
- Mancini, Elaine. Struggles of the Italian Film Industry During Fascism, 1930-1935. UMI Research Press, 1985.
