= Rue Saint-Paul =

Rue Saint-Paul may refer to:

- Rue Saint-Paul (Montreal)
- Rue Saint-Paul (Paris)

== See also ==
- St. Paul Street
