= When a Man's a Man =

When a Man's a Man may refer to:

- When a Man's a Man (1935 film), an American Western film
- When a Man's a Man (1924 film), an American silent Western film
