= Giulietta De Riso =

Italian actress (1896–1988)

- Born: 16 July 1896; Smyrna, Ottoman Empire
- Died: 17 April 1988 (aged 91); Lazio, Rome, Italy
- Occupation: Actress
- Years active: 1911–1957 (film)

Giulietta De Riso (1896–1988) was an Italian stage and film actress.

== Selected filmography ==
- The Betrothed (1914)
- La moglie del dottore (1916)
- Crevalcore (1917)
- Cardinal Lambertini (1934)
- Abandonment (1940)
- Finalmente sì (1944)

== Bibliography ==
- Goble, Alan. The Complete Index to Literary Sources in Film. Walter de Gruyter, 1999.
