= The Awakening of Jim Burke =

1935 film by Lambert Hillyer

- Directed by: Lambert Hillyer
- Screenplay by: Michael L. Simmons
- Story by: C. Gardner Sullivan; Michael L. Simmons
- Starring: Jack Holt; Florence Rice; Jimmy Butler; Kathleen Burke; Robert Middlemass; Ralph Remley
- Cinematography: Benjamin H. Kline
- Edited by: John Rawlins
- Production company: Columbia Pictures
- Distributed by: Columbia Pictures
- Release date: May 18, 1935
- Running time: 70 minutes
- Country: United States
- Language: English

The Awakening of Jim Burke is a 1935 American drama film directed by Lambert Hillyer and written by Michael L. Simmons. The film stars Jack Holt, Florence Rice, Jimmy Butler, Kathleen Burke, Robert Middlemass and Ralph Remley. The film was released on May 18, 1935, by Columbia Pictures.

== Cast ==
- Jack Holt as Jim Burke
- Florence Rice as Tess Hardie
- Jimmy Butler as Jimmy Burke
- Kathleen Burke as Laura
- Robert Middlemass as Bill Duke
- Ralph Remley as Blink
- Wyrley Birch as Lem Hardie
- George McKay as Fly Speck Sam
