= Brancaleone at the Crusades =

1970 film

- Directed by: Mario Monicelli
- Written by: Agenore Incrocci; Furio Scarpelli; Mario Monicelli
- Produced by: Mario Cecchi Gori
- Starring: Vittorio Gassman; Adolfo Celi; Sandro Dori; Beba Lončar; Gigi Proietti; Gianrico Tedeschi; Lino Toffolo; Paolo Villaggio; Stefania Sandrelli
- Music by: Carlo Rustichelli
- Distributed by: Titanus Film
- Release date: 1970
- Running time: 116 minutes
- Country: Italy
- Language: Italian

Brancaleone at the Crusades (Italian: Brancaleone alle Crociate) is an Italian comedy film directed by Mario Monicelli and released in 1970, the sequel to L'armata Brancaleone.

== Plot ==
The film starts where L'armata Brancaleone has ended. Brancaleone da Norcia leads the mad monk Zenone and his ragtag army of underdogs to the Holy Land. However, they meet another band of Christian warriors who accuse Brancaleone's band of heresy and attack. Temporarily incapacitated, Brancaleone struggles to join the battle, only to find Zenone and most of the others slaughtered. Despairing over having failed his comrades, Brancaleone asks for the Grim Reaper to cleanse him of his shame. The Reaper actually responds, but gives him the chance to redeem his honor by saving an infant of royal blood before his demise.

Brancaleone thwarts the assassin, Thorz, rescues the baby and resolves to bring him to his father, Bohemond of Taranto, who is fighting in the Crusades. As in the first film, in his quest he goes through a series of grotesque episodes, each a hilarious parody of Middle Ages stereotypes. These include the saving of a young witch, Tiburzia, from the stake, the annexion of a leper to the band, and a meeting with Gregory VII, in which Brancaleone has to solve the dispute between the pope and the antipope Clement III.

On reaching Palestine, Brancaleone delivers the child to Bohemod, but it is missing a birthmark confirming its lineage. Tiburzia admits that she truly is a witch and used magic to remove the mark. Bohemod calls for her execution, but upon Brancaleone's defense he banishes her instead. Brancaleone obtains the title of baron and is chosen as a champion in a tournament to solve the dispute between the Christians and the Saracens in the siege of Jerusalem. The award for the winner is the former leper, who is in fact revealed to be a beautiful princess, Berta, who adopted the disguise to travel to the Holy Land in relative safety. After having nearly defeated all the Moor warriors, Brancaleone is, however, foiled by a spell cast on him by Tiburzia, who, having fallen in love with him, could not stand seeing him married with the princess.

Furious at his humiliation, Brancaleone chases Tiburzia through the desert, and again Death comes to claim his prize. Brancaleone asks to be allowed to die in "knightly" fashion, in a duel with the Reaper himself, and Death agrees. After a fierce exchange of blows, Brancaleone is about to be cleft by Death's scythe but is saved by Tiburzia, who gives her life for the man she loves. Brancaleone and Tiburzia declare their love for each other just before she dies, and as Brancaleone later wanders the desert, she rejoins him in the form of a raven.

== Themes ==
Themes include the contemporary issues of the Vietnam War, Western military intervention, the Israeli-Palestinian conflict, Italy's Years of Lead, and capricious authority.

== Cast ==
- Vittorio Gassman – Brancaleone da Norcia
- Adolfo Celi – Re Boemondo
- Stefania Sandrelli – Tiburzia da Pellocce
- Beba Lončar – Berta d'Avignone
- Gigi Proietti – Death, Pattume, Colombino
- Lino Toffolo – Panigotto
- Paolo Villaggio – Thorz
- Gianrico Tedeschi – Pantaleo
- Sandro Dori – Rozzone
- Shel Shapiro – Zenone (credited as Norman David Shapiro)
