= Cry Wolf (1968 film) =

1968 British film by John Davis

- Directed by: John Davis
- Written by: John Davis
- Screenplay by: Derry Quinn
- Produced by: Michael Truman
- Starring: Anthony Kemp; Mary Burleigh; Martin Beaumont
- Cinematography: Geoffrey Faithfull
- Edited by: Nestor Lovera
- Music by: Cliff Adams
- Production company: Damor Leaderfilms Ltd
- Distributed by: Children's Film Foundation
- Release date: December 1968
- Running time: 55 minutes
- Country: United Kingdom
- Language: English

Cry Wolf is a 1968 British children's film directed and written by John Davis and starring Anthony Kemp, Janet Munro and Ian Hendry. It was made by Damor Leaderfilms for the Children's Film Foundation. It concerns three children who foil a kidnapping plot.

This was the final film of actress Janet Munro.

== Plot ==
Tony discovers a plot to kidnap a visiting Prime Minister, but no one believes him. He meets Stella, a reporter, who does believe him, but she is secretly the mastermind behind the kidnapping plan. With the help of his friends Martin and Mary, Tony manages to foil the plot.

== Cast ==
- Anthony Kemp as Tony
- Mary Burleigh as Mary
- Martin Beaumont as Martin
- Judy Cornwell as Stella
- Eileen Moore as Muriel Walker
- Maurice Kaufmann as Jim Walker
- John Trenaman as Ben
- Rex Stallings as marksman
- Alfred Bell as Insp. Blake
- Mary Yeomans as Mrs. Quinn, woman in tobacconist's shop
- Pat Coombs as Mrs. Blades
- Kevin Manser as town clerk
- Alec Bregonzi as sound man
- Wilfrid Brambell as delivery man (as Wilfred Brambell)
- Adrienne Corri as Muriel & Polly's friend in car
- Walter Gotell as Ronan (as Walter Cotell)
- Ian Hendry as Hobson
- Janet Munro as Polly
- Roy Moore

== Critical reception ==
The Monthly Film Bulletin wrote: "Something of a variation on the usual Children's Film Foundation productions in that the villains are played straight: This certainly makes for greater plausibility, and despite some inconsistency in the playing and a rather feeble attempt at comedy, there is ample compensation in Judy Cornwell's splendid villainess and the suspense is quite effectively sustained."

Kine Weekly wrote: "Rather more adult than the usual C.F.F. fare, this is an exciting tale that should please the slightly older children. Good, matinee attraction. This departure from the usual style of C.F.F. productions looks as though it will justify the experiment of using a far more sophisticated plot and having villains who are bad without being ludicrous. The quite sensible story has exciting moments and a tense climax that should thrill most ages. The main role of the boy Tony is played with a natural eagerness by Anthony Kemp and the adult leads – Judy Cornwell, Maurice Kaufmann, John Trenaman Rex Stallings and Eileen Moore – all play seriously."
