= The Boys of Paul Street =

1969 film

- Directed by: Zoltán Fábri
- Written by: Endre Bohem; Zoltán Fábri
- Based on: The Paul Street Boys by Ferenc Molnár
- Produced by: Endre Bohem
- Starring: Mari Törőcsik
- Cinematography: György Illés
- Production companies: Groskopf; MAFILM Stúdió 1
- Distributed by: 20th Century Fox
- Release date: 23 June 1969
- Running time: 110 minutes
- Countries: Hungary; United States
- Language: Hungarian

The Boys of Paul Street (Hungarian: A Pál utcai fiúk) is a 1969 Hungarian-American drama film directed by Zoltán Fábri and based on the 1906 young adult novel The Paul Street Boys by Ferenc Molnár. It was nominated for the Academy Award for Best Foreign Language Film. It features English-speaking (American and British) child actors (led by Anthony Kemp as Ernő Nemecsek) accompanied by Hungarians including Fábri's favorite actress Mari Törőcsik as Nemecsek's mother. The film is acclaimed as the best and most faithful adaptation of Molnár's source novel and a highlight of Hungarian film.

== Plot ==
Budapest, at the beginning of the 20th century. The story revolves around two rival youth gangs. On one side are the students of St. Paul, on the other are the so-called Red Shirts, led by the aggressive, brutal, and intimidating Feri Áts. After two members of the Red Shirts commit violence against the young Ernő Nemecsek, the members of the Paul Street Gang, under the leadership of János Boka, decide that it's time to put an end to the Red Shirt provocations once and for all and to settle the question of who controls the construction site on Paul Street in a "final battle." The Red Shirts are determined to take away the playground, known as the "Grund," from the boys of Paul Street and are not shy about their choice of weapons. Betrayal (namely by Geréb) and mutual spying are also employed.

Now it is up to little Nemecsek, who is often not taken seriously by either his own people or the opposing ruffians, to prove his courage and loyalty to his own comrades. He retrieves the flag of his own youth gang, which was captured by the Red Shirts, and suddenly becomes the hero. The final battle takes place with all means on the "Grund," including fights from "man" to "man." Although János' boys from Paul Street win the decision, little Nemecsek, who is "submerged" in the adjacent pond, catches pneumonia and eventually dies in his mother's arms. Both sides pay respect to the brave Ernő. In bitter realization that the fight for the "Grund" was completely in vain because the undeveloped piece of land is to be assigned a new purpose by the city and will never serve as a playground for any of the children again, everyone is left deeply affected.

== Cast ==
- Mari Törőcsik as Nemecsek's mother
- Sándor Pécsi as teacher Rácz
- László Kozák as Janó
- Anthony Kemp as Ernő Nemecsek
- William Burleigh as Boka
- John Moulder-Brown as Geréb
- Robert Efford as Csónakos
- Mark Colleano as Csele
- Gary O'Brien as Weisz
- Martin Beaumont as Kolnay
- Paul Bartlett as Barabás
- Earl Younger as Leszik

== See also ==
- The Paul Street Boys, a 1935 Italian film adaptation of the same novel
- List of submissions to the 41st Academy Awards for Best Foreign Language Film
- List of Hungarian submissions for the Academy Award for Best Foreign Language Film
