= The Paul Street Boys (film) =

1935 film

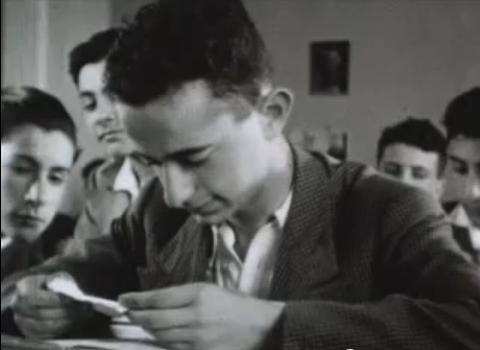
- Directed by: Mario Monicelli; Alberto Mondadori
- Written by: Mario Monicelli; Alberto Mondadori
- Based on: The Paul Street Boys by Ferenc Molnár
- Starring: Alberto Vigevani; Giulio Tamagnini; Giulio Macchi; Carlo Cartagliani; Federico Mezzanotte; Bruno Aghion; Rinaldo Sacchi
- Cinematography: Cesare Civita
- Release date: 1935
- Country: Italy
- Language: Italian

The Paul Street Boys (Italian: I ragazzi della via Paal) is a 1935 Italian drama film directed by Mario Monicelli and Alberto Mondadori. It is based on the novel by Ferenc Molnár and was entered into the 3rd Venice International Film Festival.

== See also ==
- The Boys of Paul Street, a 1969 Hungarian film based on the same novel
