= Summer Rains =

Summer Rains may refer to:

- Summer Rains (album), a 2008 album by the Ditty Bops
- Operation Summer Rains, a 2006 Israeli military operation

== See also ==
- Summer Rain (disambiguation)
