= No Greater Glory =

1934 film by Frank Borzage

- Film poster
- Directed by: Frank Borzage
- Screenplay by: Jo Swerling
- Based on: A pal utcai fiuk 1906 Hungarian novel by Ferenc Molnár
- Produced by: Frank Borzage; Samuel Briskin (Supv)
- Starring: George P. Breakston; Jimmy Butler; Jackie Searl
- Cinematography: Joseph H. August
- Edited by: Viola Lawrence
- Music by: R.H. Bassett; Louis Silvers
- Distributed by: Columbia Pictures
- Release date: March 30, 1934
- Running time: 74 minutes
- Country: United States
- Language: English

No Greater Glory is a 1934 American pre-Code allegorical antiwar film directed by Frank Borzage and based on the novel A Pál utcai fiúk by Ferenc Molnár, known in English as The Boys of Paul Street. The film's box-office performance was described as "dismal".

The film is noteworthy for employing mostly children in its cast; adults only appear in the opening scenes and then fleetingly thereafter. The action centers around an abandoned lumberyard where small kids play army. When a group of older boys try take control of the space, the younger children must play soldiers for real, with tragedy almost inevitable.

Despite its box-office failure, No Greater Glory has since become reappraised as an important film, with Leonard Maltin describing it in his Leonard Maltin's Classic Movie Guide as "deeply felt" and "passionately acted", while Borzage authority Michael Grost noted its depiction of "the insidious appeal of militarism".

On August 23, 2019, Sony Pictures Home Entertainment released the film as a Region 1 made-on-demand DVD.

== Cast ==
- George Breakston as Nemecsek
- Frankie Darro as Feri Ats
- Jackie Searl as Gereb
- Jimmy Butler as Boka
- Donald Haines as Csonakos
- Lois Wilson as Mother
- Christian Rub as Watchman
- Samuel Hinds as Gereb Sr.
- Ralph Morgan as Nemecsek Sr.
- Egon Brecher as Rasz
- Rolf Ernest as Ferdie Paztor
- Julius Molnar as Henry
- Wesley Giraud as Kolnay
- Beaudine Anderson as Csele

== Reception ==
In a contemporary review for The New York Times, critic Mordaunt Hall called No Greater Glory "a provocative and unusual picture" and wrote: "It is rather too sentimental at times, but, nevertheless, compelling because of its vitality and the good work of the boys who portray the leading roles. ... In fact, aside from occasional fits of self-consciousness, the performances of all these lads are highly praiseworthy."

The film was initially banned upon its release in Paris, where it was titled Comme les grands ("Like the Adults"), with censors simply calling its release "inopportune" for its antiwar theme at a time when pacifism was not a popular sentiment. However, the French minister of fine arts Georges Huisman lifted the ban after viewing the film along with an enthusiastic audience of the elites of Paris society and art.
