= Mario Monicelli =

Italian film director and screenwriter (1915–2010)

Mario Monicelli OMRI
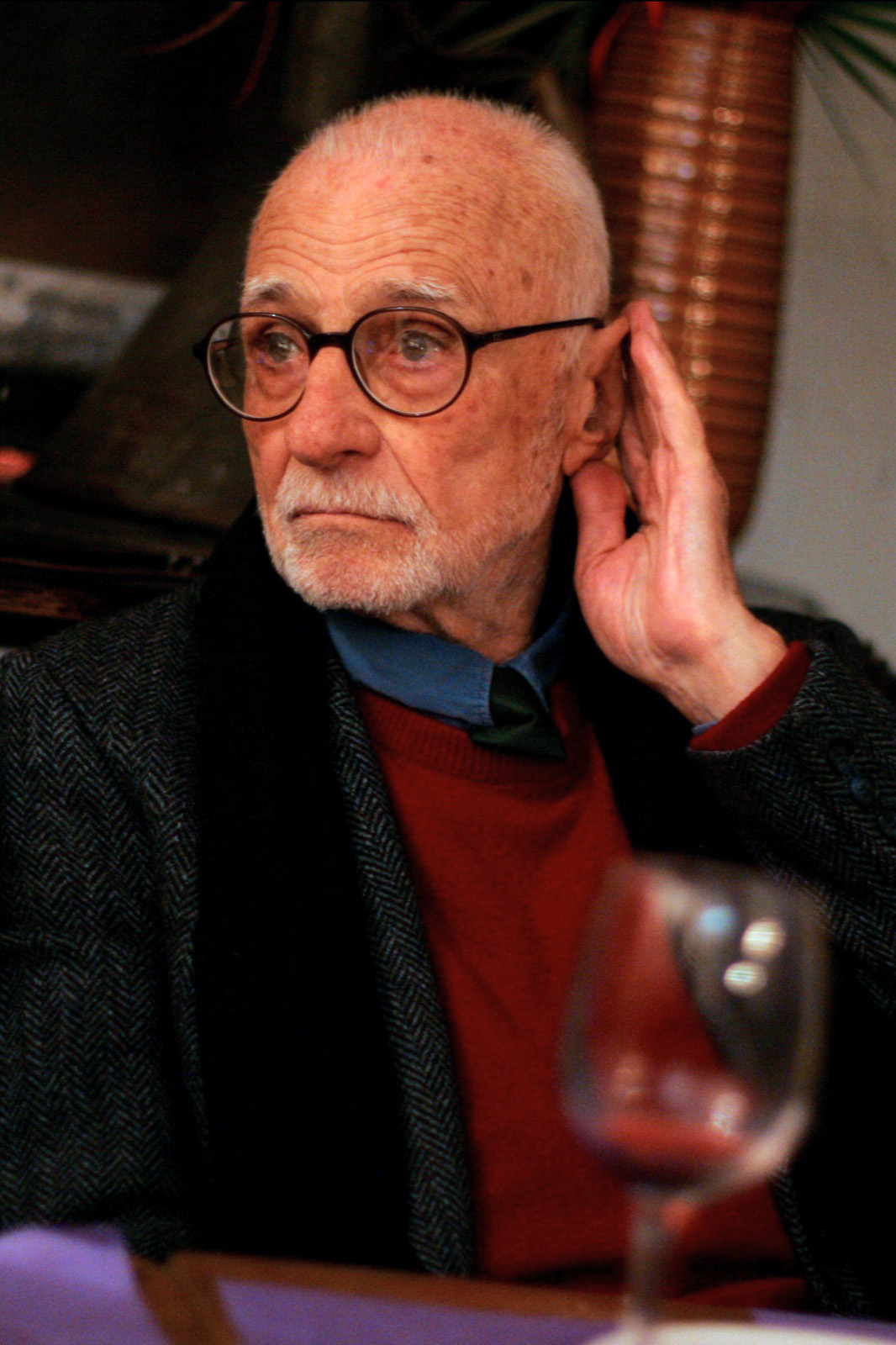
- Monicelli in 2005
- Born: 16 May 1915; Rome, Kingdom of Italy
- Died: 29 November 2010 (aged 95); Rome, Italy
- Occupations: Screenwriter; Film director; actor
- Years active: 1935–2010
- Awards: Silver Bear for Best Director; 1957: Fathers and Sons; 1976: Caro Michele; 1981: Il Marchese del Grillo; Golden Lion; 1959: The Great War; Career Golden Lion; 1991: Lifetime Achievement

Mario Alberto Ettore Monicelli (Italian: [ˈmaːrjo moniˈtʃɛlli]; 16 May 1915 – 29 November 2010) was an Italian film director and screenwriter.

Considered one of the greatest Italian directors of his genre, he was one of the masters of the commedia all'italiana ("Italian-style comedy"), was nominated six times for an Academy Award, and received the Golden Lion at the Venice Film Festival in 1991.

== Biography ==
=== Early life ===
Monicelli was born in Rome to an upper-class family from Ostiglia, a town in the province of Mantua, in the Northern Italian region of Lombardy. He was the second of the five children of Tomaso Monicelli, a journalist, and Maria Carreri, a housewife. His older half-brother, Giorgio (whose mother was actress Elisa Severi), worked as a writer and translator. Another older brother, Franco, was a journalist.

Monicelli was raised in Rome, Viareggio (Tuscany) and Milan. He lived a mostly carefree youth. Many of the cinematic jokes he later shot in My Friends (1975) were inspired by his own experiences during his years in Tuscany.

During his time at the university in Milan, Monicelli met Riccardo Freda, Remo Cantoni, Alberto Lattuada, Alberto Mondadori and Vittorio Sereni, with whom he founded the newspaper Camminare, with the support of the publisher Mondadori. In Camminare, Monicelli wrote the columns on film criticism. He tended to heavily criticize Italian films, while being more lenient on American and French films. Monicelli later recounted that his non-nationalistic taste might have been a veiled form of anti-fascism. The Ministry of Popular Culture soon shut the publication down because of its left-wing ideals.

Monicelli later returned to Tuscany to complete his studies with the department of Literature and Philosophy of the University of Pisa. He delayed his graduation until he was drafted into the army, later saying it was because "dressing as a soldier was enough to get your degree; you didn't even need to write a dissertation, nor anything else [...] That's how my graduation went, I even doubt the worth of my degree."

In 1934 he shot his first cinematographic experiment, together with the then architecture student Alberto Lattuada who provided the scenography and Alberto Mondadori. Their short film, Cuore Rivelatore, was inspired by Edgar Allan Poe's short story of the same name (The Tell-Tale Heart). They proceeded to send it to the Littorali national cultural festival, but it was not shown because it was branded as an example of "paranoid cinema".

=== Rise to fame ===
Together with his friend Alberto Mondadori, he released the silent film I ragazzi della Via Paal (an adaptation of the novel The Paul Street Boys), which won an award at the Venice Film Festival. The award earned Monicelli the opportunity to work in the production of a professional film. He was therefore able to skip the various stages of professional training and was sent, together with Mondadori, to work as a camera assistant in the production of Gustav Machatý's film Ballerine.

After that he found work, as a camera assistant again, in Augusto Genina's film Lo squadrone bianco (1936) and The Castiglioni Brothers (1937) by Corrado D'Errico. There he met Giacomo Gentilomo, who hired him as an assistant director and co-writer for Short Circuit (1943), considered a possible precursor to the giallo genre.

In 1937, under the pseudonym of Michele Badiek, he wrote and directed the amateur film Summer Rain (1937). The film was watched by many friends and fellow citizens. Monicelli said that this experience was important for his training, as he learned to

"write for the cinema, to shoot, to deal with actors [...] And, above all, to realise, when I watched the film again in the theater, that what I was putting on the screen every day did not correspond, if at all, to my expectations".

From 1939 to 1942, he wrote up to 40 screenplays and worked as an assistant director.

In 1940 Monicelli enlisted in the cavalry, hoping that this choice could avoid him being sent to Russia or to Africa. When the army broke up in 1943, he fled to Rome, where he remained hidden until the summer of 1944.

In 1946 his father Tomaso committed suicide. Being a journalist and a literary critic, Tomaso Monicelli had dared to criticise the fascist regime, especially after the murder of Giacomo Matteotti in 1924. He was blacklisted and boycotted for his writings and endured a series of failures. Later on, Monicelli said he could understand his father's decision.

"I understood his gesture. He had been unjustly cut off from his job, even after the war was over, and he felt he had nothing left to do here. Life is not always worth living; if it stops being true and dignified, it's not worth it. I found my father's body. Around six o'clock in the morning I heard a gunshot, I got up and forced the bathroom door open. A very modest bathroom, by the way."

=== Italian-style comedy ===
Monicelli made his official debut as a director in 1949 along with Steno, with the film Totò cerca casa, starring the acclaimed comedian Totò. From the very beginning of his career, Monicelli's cinematic style had a remarkable flow to it. The duo produced eight successful movies in four years, including the cult film Cops and Robbers (1951) and Totò a colori (1952). From 1953 onwards Monicelli worked alone, without leaving his role as a writer of screenplays.

Monicelli's career includes some of the masterpieces of Italian cinema. In Big Deal on Madonna Street (1958), featuring the ubiquitous comedian Totò in a side role, he discovered the comical talent of Vittorio Gassman and Marcello Mastroianni and probably started the new genre of the modern commedia all'italiana ("Italian-style comedy"). While better known in the English-speaking world under the title Big Deal on Madonna Street, the actual translation from the Italian is "the usual unknown perpetrators" (closely resembling the famous line from Casablanca: "Round up the usual suspects"). The film was nominated for the Best Foreign Language Film at the 31st Academy Awards.

The Great War (1959), released one year later, is generally regarded as one of his most successful works, which rewarded Monicelli with a Golden Lion in the Venice Film Festival, and an Academy Award nomination for the Best Foreign Film. The film featured the famous drama actor Vittorio Gassman, the Italian superstar of comedy, Alberto Sordi, and a star of Italian neorealism Silvana Mangano. It stood apart for its absence of rhetorical flourish and its sharp, tragicomic sense of history while portraying the Italian victory in World War I.

Among the difficulties encountered in the production of the films, those related to censorship were particularly strong. The film Toto and Carolina (1955) underwent three revisions, because according to the censors, the mere fact that the policeman was played by Totò was tantamount to pillorying the police.

Monicelli received two more Academy Award nominations with I compagni (1963), a heartfelt homage to "humanitarian socialism" and The Girl with the Pistol (1968), which tackled the themes of bride kidnapping and honor killing, still relevant in the Southern-Italian culture of the time.

For Love and Gold (1966) is another masterpiece of Italian cinema. The film tells the tragicomic tale of a Middle Ages Italian knight, with uncertain nobility and few means but high ideals, self-confidence and pomposity (Vittorio Gassman). The bizarre macaronic Latin-Italian dialogues were devised by Age & Scarpelli, the most renowned writers of Italian comedies, and represent a whole linguistic invention which was followed by Brancaleone at the Crusades (1970), and less successfully in Bertoldo, Bertoldino e Cacasenno (1984).

My Friends (1975), featuring Ugo Tognazzi, Adolfo Celi, Gastone Moschin, Duilio Del Prete and Philippe Noiret, was one of the most successful films in Italy and confirmed Monicelli's genius in mixing humour, irony and bitter understanding of the human condition. The film was popular to the point that some lines are today turned into well-established idiomatic expressions ("la supercazzola"), and even a programming language ("monicelli") has been created using a syntax based on film quotes. Caro Michele (1976) won him the Silver Bear for Best Director at the 26th Berlin International Film Festival.

Dramatic accents predominated in An Average Little Man (1977), featuring Alberto Sordi for his first complete dramatic role. Here Monicelli's pessimism takes over: the transformation of Italian society was such that it was no longer possible to laugh, believe or hope. This is why it is considered by many critics to be the film that brings the season of Italian-style comedy to a close.

=== Later years ===
He turned again to more cheerful comedy and attention to historical events from a popular, intimate point of view with Il Marchese del Grillo (1981), also featuring Alberto Sordi. The film was awarded Monicelli's third Silver Bear for Best Director award at the 32nd Berlin International Film Festival. The Rogues (1987) was also a historical parody set during Renaissance.

Among the final works by Monicelli are Let's Hope It's a Girl (1986), Parenti serpenti (1992) and Dear Goddamned Friends (1994), featuring Paolo Hendel. The latter won an Honourable Mention at the 44th Berlin International Film Festival. His 1999 film Dirty Linen was entered in the 21st Moscow International Film Festival.

His last feature film was The Roses of the Desert (2006), which he directed when he was 91 years old.

At the Venice Film Festival, he received the Golden Lion for Lifetime Achievement in 1991 and he was president of the jury in 2002. A 2008 documentary by Roberto Salinas and Marina Catucci, Una storia da ridere, breve biografia di Mario Monicelli, aimed to trace Monicelli's contribution to Italy's 'eretic spirit'.

=== Death ===
At the age of 90, Monicelli decided to go and live on his own, in order to remain self-sufficient and age well for longer.

"[I did it]To stay alive as long as possible. The love of women, relatives, daughters, wives, lovers, is very dangerous. A woman is a nurse at heart, and if she has an old man near her, she is always ready to interpret his every wish, to run and bring him what he needs. So, little by little, this old man doesn't do anything any more, he stays in his armchair, he doesn't move any more and he becomes a dumb old man. If, on the other hand, the old man is forced to do things for himself, make his own bed, go out, light the cooker, sometimes burn himself, he will live ten years longer.

He died on 29 November 2010 at the age of 95. He killed himself by jumping from a window of the San Giovanni Hospital in Rome, where he had been admitted a few days earlier for prostate cancer in the terminal stage. He had two daughters, Martina (1967) and Ottavia (1974), from Antonella Salerni. He had a third daughter, Rosa (1988), from his last companion Chiara Rapaccini. He was an outspoken atheist.

== Filmography ==
=== As director ===
- The Paul Street Boys (with Alberto Mondadori, 1935)
- Summer Rain (1937)
- Toto Looks for a House (with Steno, 1949)
- A Night of Fame (1949, with Steno)
- A Dog's Life (with Steno, 1950)
- The Knight Has Arrived! (with Steno, 1950)
- Cops and Robbers (with Steno, 1951)
- Toto and the King of Rome (with Steno, 1952)
- Toto and the Women (with Steno, 1952)
- The Unfaithfuls (with Steno, 1953)
- Proibito (1954)
- A Hero of Our Times (1955)
- Toto and Carolina (1955)
- Donatella (1956)
- Doctor and the Healer (1957)
- Fathers and Sons (1957)
- Big Deal on Madonna Street (1958)
- The Great War (1959)
- The Passionate Thief (1960)
- Boccaccio '70 (1962 – segment "Renzo and Luciana")
- The Organizer (1963)
- High Infidelity (1964, with Luciano Salce, Elio Petri and Franco Rossi)
- Casanova '70 (1965)
- Sex Quartet (1966 –, with Mauro Bolognini, Antonio Pietrangeli and Luciano Salce)
- For Love and Gold (1966)
- The Girl with the Pistol (1968)
- Caprice Italian Style (1968, with Mauro Bolognini, Steno, Pino Zac, Pier Paolo Pasolini and Franco Rossi)
- Oh, Grandmother's Dead (1969)
- Brancaleone at the Crusades (1970)
- Man and Wife (1971, with Alberto Sordi and Vittorio De Sica)
- Lady Liberty (1971)
- We Want the Colonels (1973)
- Come Home and Meet My Wife (1974)
- My Friends (1975)
- Caro Michele (1976)
- Goodnight, Ladies and Gentlemen (1976, with Luigi Comencini, Nanni Loy, Luigi Magni and Ettore Scola)
- An Average Little Man (1977)
- Viva Italia! (1977, with Dino Risi and Ettore Scola)
- Lovers and Liars (1979)
- Hurricane Rosy (1979)
- Camera d'albergo (1981)
- Il marchese del Grillo (1981)
- All My Friends Part 2 (1982)
- Bertoldo, Bertoldino e Cacasenno (1984)
- The Two Lives of Mattia Pascal (1985)
- Let's Hope It's a Girl (1986)
- The Rogues (1987)
- La moglie ingenua e il marito malato (1989)
- 12 registi per 12 città (1989, documentary. Segment "Verona")
- Dark Illness (1990)
- Rossini! Rossini! (1991)
- Parenti serpenti (1992)
- Dear Goddamned Friends (1994)
- Facciamo paradiso (1995)
- Esercizi di stile (1996 – segment Idillio edile)
- Topi di appartamento (1997, short)
- Dirty Linen (1999)
- Un amico magico: il maestro Nino Rota (1999, documentary)
- Come quando fuori piove (2000, TV mini series)
- Un altro mondo è possibile (2001, documentary)
- Lettere dalla Palestina (2002, documentary)
- Firenze, il nostro domani (2003, documentary)
- The Roses of the Desert (2006)

=== As screenwriter ===
- The Paul Street Boys (1935)
- Summer Rain (1937)
- La granduchessa si diverte (1940)
- Thrill (1941)
- The Lady Is Fickle (1942)
- Short Circuit (1943)
- Fear no Evil (1945)
- Black Eagle (1946)
- The Opium Den (1947)
- Lost Youth (1947)
- The Captain's Daughter (1947)
- The Courier of the King (1947)
- Mad About Opera (1948)
- Les Misérables (1948)
- L'ebreo errante (1948)
- The Mysterious Rider (1948)
- Accidenti alla guerra! (1948)
- Double Cross (1949)
- A Night of Fame (1949)
- Toto Looks for a House (1949)
- The Wolf of the Sila (1949)
- The Iron Swordsman (1949)
- Her Favourite Husband (1950)
- A Dog's Life (1950)
- Soho Conspiracy (1950)
- The Elusive Twelve (1950)
- The Knight Has Arrived! (1950)
- Il brigante Musolino (1950)
- I'm in the Revue (1950)
- Cops and Robbers (1951)
- Tizio, Caio, Sempronio (1951)
- It's Love That's Ruining Me (1951)
- The Ungrateful Heart (1951)
- Accidents to the Taxes!! (1951)
- Appointment for Murder (1951)
- Toto and the King of Rome (1952)
- Sardinian Vendetta (1952)
- Toto and the Women (1952)
- Toto in Color (1952)
- Perdonami! (1952)
- Five Paupers in an Automobile (1952)
- Cats and Dogs (1952)
- Neapolitan Turk (1953)
- Funniest Show on Earth (1953)
- The Unfaithfuls (1953)
- Fatal Desire (1953)
- Giuseppe Verdi (1953)
- Guai ai vinti (1954)
- Proibito (1954)
- A Hero of Our Times (1955)
- Toto and Carolina (1955)
- Donatella (1956)
- Doctor and the Healer (1957)
- Fathers and Sons (1957)
- Big Deal on Madonna Street (1958)
- The Great War (1959)
- The Passionate Thief (1960)
- On the Tiger's Back (1961)
- Boccaccio '70 (1962 – segment "Renzo e Luciana")
- Shivers in Summer (1963)
- The Organizer (1963)
- Casanova 70 (1965)
- Our Husbands (1966 – segment "Il marito di Olga")
- For Love and Gold (1966)
- The Girl with the Pistol (1968)
- Oh, Grandmother's Dead (1969)
- Brancaleone at the Crusades (1970)
- We Want the Colonels (1973)
- Black Journal (1977)
- My Friends (1975)
- An Average Little Man (1977)
- Hurricane Rosy (1979)
- Camera d'albergo (1981)
- Il marchese del Grillo (1981)
- All My Friends Part 2 (1982)
- Bertoldo, Bertoldino e Cacasenno (1984)
- The Two Lives of Mattia Pascal (1985)
- Let's Hope It's a Girl (1986)
- The Rogues (1987)
- Dark Illness (1990)
- Rossini! Rossini! (1991)
- Parenti serpenti (1992)
- Dear Goddamned Friends (1994)
- Facciamo paradiso (1995)
- Dirty Linen (1999)
- Un amico magico: il maestro Nino Rota (1999, documentary)
- Come quando fuori piove (2000, TV mini series)
- The Roses of the Desert (2006)

=== As actor ===
- Rue du Pied de Grue (1979)
- I'm Photogenic, directed by Dino Risi (1980)
- The Cyclone, directed by Leonardo Pieraccioni (1996, voice)
- Under the Tuscan Sun (2003)
