= Anthony Kemp (actor) =

British actor

- Years active: 1968-present

Anthony Kemp is a British interior designer and former child actor. He is best known for his role as Ernő Nemecsek in the Hungarian drama film The Boys of Paul Street (1969), which he played when he was fourteen.

He retired from acting as a teenager and decided to pursue a career in visual arts instead. He has become a successful interior designer. He is openly gay.

== Works ==
=== Movies ===
- Cromwell (1970) as Henry Cromwell
- London Affair (1970)
- Uncle Jonathan (1969)
- The Strange Case (1969)
- Cry Wolf (1968)
- The Boys of Paul Street (1968) as Ernő Nemecsek
- Oliver! (1968) as an orphanage boy
