= Ferenc Molnár =

Hungarian-born dramatist and novelist

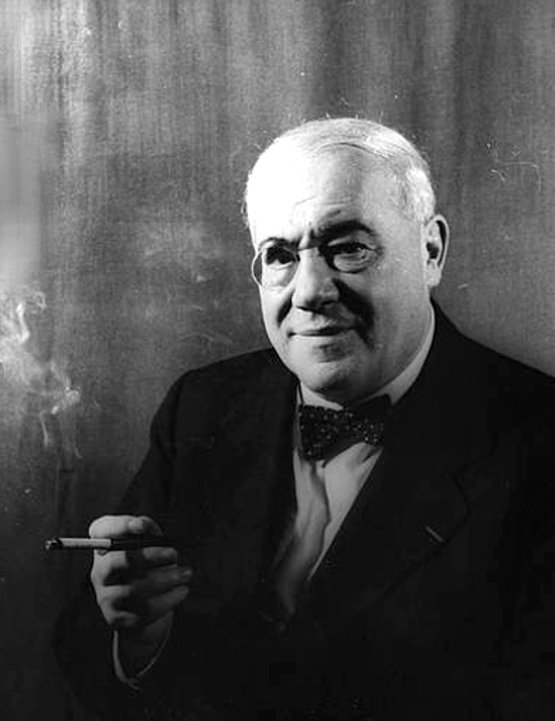
- Portrait by Carl Van Vechten, 1941
- Born: Ferenc Neumann; 12 January 1878; Budapest, Austria-Hungary (modern-day Hungary)
- Died: 1 April 1952 (aged 74); New York City, New York
- Resting place: Linden Hill Cemetery, Ridgewood, Queens, New York
- Occupations: Novelist; author; stage director; dramatist
- Spouse(s): Margit Vészi (1906–1910; divorced; 1 child); Sári Fedák (1922–1925; divorced); Lili Darvas (1926–1952; his death)
- Children: Marta Molnar Sarkozi (1907–1966) suicide
- Writing career
- Years active: 1901–1952

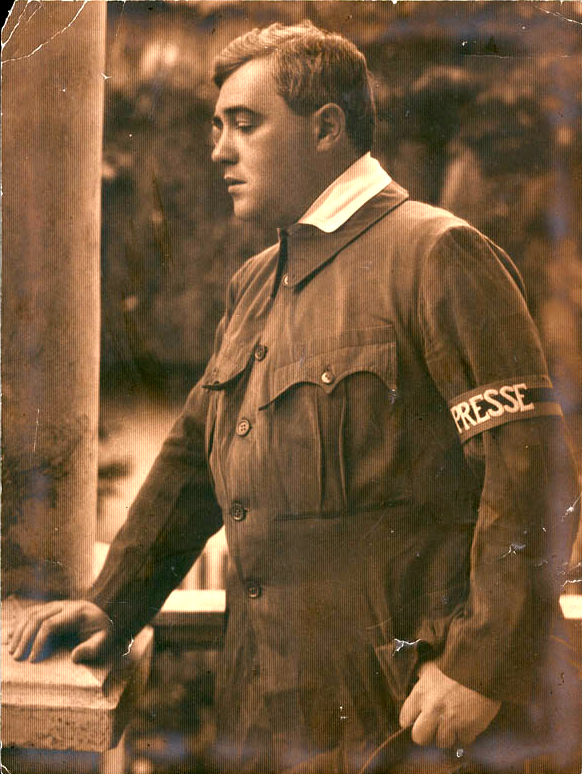
Ferenc Molnár was a war correspondent during the First World War.

Ferenc Molnár (US: /ˌfɛrɛnts ˈmoʊlnɑːr, -rənts -, - ˈmɔːl-/ FERR-ents MOHL-nar, -ənts -, - MAWL-, Hungarian: [ˈfɛrɛnt͡s ˈmolnaːr]; born Ferenc Neumann; January 12, 1878 – April 1, 1952), often anglicized as Franz Molnar, was a Hungarian-born author, stage director, dramatist, and poet. He is widely regarded as Hungary's most celebrated and controversial playwright.

His primary aim through his writing was to entertain by transforming his personal experiences into literary works of art. While he never connected to any one literary movement, he did use the precepts of naturalism, neo-romanticism, expressionism, and Freudian psychoanalytic theories, so long as they suited his desires. According to Clara Györgyey, “By fusing the realistic narrative and stage tradition of Hungary with Western influences into a cosmopolitan amalgam, Molnár emerged as a versatile artist whose style was uniquely his own."

As a novelist, Molnár is perhaps remembered best for The Paul Street Boys, the story of two rival gangs of youths in Budapest. It has been translated into 42 languages and adapted for the stage and film. It has been considered a masterpiece by many.

However, it was as a playwright that he made his most significant contribution and how he is best known internationally. For Györgyey, "In his graceful, whimsical, sophisticated drawing-room comedies, he provided a felicitous synthesis of naturalism and fantasy, realism and romanticism, cynicism, and sentimentality, the profane and the sublime." Of his many plays, The Devil, Liliom, The Swan, The Guardsman, and The Play's the Thing endure as classics. His influences included luminaries such as Oscar Wilde, George Bernard Shaw, and Gerhart Hauptmann.

Molnár's plays continue to be performed world-wide. His national and international fame has inspired many Hungarian playwrights, including Elemér Boross, László Fodor, Lajos Bíró, László Bús-Fekete, Ernő Vajda, Attila Orbók, and Imre Földes, among others.

He immigrated to the United States to escape the persecution of Hungarian Jews during World War II and later adopted American citizenship. He died in New York City.

== Life ==
=== Early years ===
Ferenc Molnár was born in Budapest on January 12, 1878, to Dr. Mór Neumann, a prosperous and well-regarded gastroenterologist, and Jozefa Wallfisch, both of German-Jewish heritage. The home in which he lived was opulent but gloomy. Even though he was born into wealth, "It was not a friendly atmosphere for the lively and precocious Ferenc, who constantly had to be warned to keep quiet." Just a year before his birth, his parents' firstborn son and Molnár's brother, László, died. His mother was frail and frequently bedridden. Illness spread throughout the rooms of his house, and young Ferenc was constantly being told to keep quiet. His mother died in 1898 when Ferenc was 20 years of age.

In 1887, Molnár entered the Lónyay Utcai Református Gimnázium, a secondary school (high school) located in Budapest, Hungary, where he was inspired to learn foreign languages and where his talent as a writer began to emerge. At fourteen, he started a periodical, Haladás ("Progress"), which sold only four copies, and a secondary publication, Életképek ("Panorama"), selling only 20 copies. His first dramatic work was A Kék Barlang (The Blue Cave), a controversial play written, directed, and staged in the basement of a friend's house.

Upon completing secondary school, Molnár studied law at the University of Budapest in 1895. Shortly after, he was sent to Geneva by his father to continue his studies at the University of Geneva. While living in Geneva, he began to write frequently, often sending his work to various papers. Molnár also wrote the short novella Magdolna during this time.

He also traveled to Paris to see some of the chic new plays. "The fashionable boulevard comedies of Bernstein, Bataille, Capus, and others left a deep impression on him and later greatly influenced his dramatic style."

In 1896, he abandoned a legal career to pursue a full-time career as a journalist. He covered a variety of topics during his time as a journalist. However, his primary focus was the court trials for Vészi's Budapesti Napló ("Budapest Daily"), a newspaper then edited and published by József Vészi, a Jewish intellectual who dominated Hungarian political journalism. Molnár's first wife was one of Vészi's daughters, Margit Vészi.

Molnár served as a proud and jingoistic supporter of the Austro-Hungarian Empire while working as a war correspondent during World War I. His war reports were so positive that he was decorated by the Habsburg emperor but criticized by some pacifist peers. He would later write Reflections of a War Correspondent, describing his experiences.

=== Literary and theatrical career ===
In 1901, Molnár published his first full-length novel Az éhes város ("The Hungry City"). This novel made Molnár's name familiar throughout Hungary. It was "a relentless exposé of the evil effect of money, viewed by a young, idealistic newspaperman."

The year following the release of Az éhes város, Molnár began writing for the theatre, the medium through which he became known internationally. His journalistic work influenced his early works as a playwright. Molnár's first play, A doktor úr (The Lawyer), and the play that followed, Józsi, are both comedies that essentially dramatized newspaper sketches about a spoiled rich child, and were published as a collection of short dialogues.

His personal life formed the basis for many of his works. After separating from his first wife, he became involved with the famous Hungarian actress Irén Szécsi, who was then married to a wealthy manufacturer. Their affair influenced some of his more critically successful works.

In 1907, Molnár wrote Az ördög (The Devil) for Irén, in which he challenged her to leave her husband. It brought Molnár international fame and was performed all over Europe and New York. Hungarian-born American director Michael Curtiz later adapted The Devil into a film; three years later, James Young directed an English-language version.

He wrote Liliom, in 1909; he allegedly sought to regain favor with his wife Margit by portraying her in the role of Juli. The play was initially a failure when presented in Budapest," but became his best-known play when produced on Broadway in 1920 and elsewhere outside Hungary. It acquired even more widespread fame when adapted into a film by Fritz Lang featuring Charles Boyer (Paris, 1934) and then the Broadway stage musical, Carousel (1945; film 1956) by Richard Rodgers and Oscar Hammerstein II.

Molnár continued to dramatize the complexities of his affair with Irén through his plays, The Guardsman (1910) and The Wolf (1912); The Guardsman served as the basis for the 1931 film of the same name, starring American power couple Alfred Lunt and Lynn Fontanne.

Molnár fell into a deep depression after Irén cut off their affair and returned to her family. He resorted to drinking heavily as a result, and in 1911 attempted suicide. He was rehabilitated in Austria and continued writing during this dark time. Between 1910 and 1914, five volumes of his collected essays, plus his translations of over 30 French plays, were published. "Molnár's long and turbulent life was one of hard and incessant work. For over 50 years, he transposed his inner conflict in his literary work; writing was his oxygen, elixir, and self-therapy," wrote monographist and fellow Hungarian emigré Clara (Klára) Györgyey. As a further example, while writing The Devil in 1907, Molnár also wrote three books, including his novel for young people, A Pál-utcai Fiúk (The Paul Street Boys).

Molnár's later plays, such as The Swan (1920), and The Play's the Thing (1924), continued to receive a wide audience and favorable reviews. More than 100 movies and television productions have been made out of his works, including The Swan, which was brought to the screen in 1956 with Grace Kelly and Louis Jourdan, and Egy, kettő, három, which Billy Wilder turned into One, Two, Three, starring James Cagney and Horst Buchholz, in 1961. His novel The Paul Street Boys has been filmed repeatedly in English, Italian and Hungarian. That novel has also been widely popular in translation and made part of grade school curricula in Croatia, Serbia and Poland.

=== Later years ===
On January 12, 1940, Molnár relocated to America and spent his last 12 years living in Room 835 at New York's Plaza Hotel. In 1943, he suffered a massive heart attack, forcing him to suspend work for almost a year. To celebrate the end of World War II, Molnár wrote and published Isten veled szivem (God Be With You My Heart) and the English Edition of The Captain of St Margaret's.

After the war, Molnár became outraged and depressed after learning of the fate of his Jewish friends and colleagues during the Holocaust in Hungary, and his personality changed. He became apathetic, morose, and misanthropic.

In 1947, Molnár's secretary and devoted companion Wanda Bartha died by suicide. This event had a lasting effect on Molnár. Upon her death, he wrote Companion in Exile, his most tragic work, recalling his friend's sacrifices and their time together. Molnár donated all his manuscripts and bound scrapbooks containing articles about him, prepared by Wanda Bartha, to the New York Public Library.

=== Personal life and death ===
Molnár's first marriage to Margit Vészi ended in divorce in 1910.

In 1922 he married the actor Sári Fedák, after a six-year relationship. The couple divorced in 1925, after "he had accused her of intimacy with 42 gentlemen, and she had replied in kind with a list of 142 ladies".

Molnár married the actor Lili Darvas shortly after divorcing Fedák in 1925. They were active both in Vienna, where Darvas acted as part of Max Reinhardt's theatrical troupe at the Theater in der Josefstadt from 1925 until the Anschluss in 1938, when they were forced to flee.

Molnár and Darvas had long been fixtures on the theatrical scene in New York, where Liliom had become a hit. They arrived in New York in 1940. He and Darvas later separated amicably, but remained married and friends until Molnár's death in 1952.

Molnár died of cancer, aged 74, at the Mount Sinai Hospital in New York City on April 1, 1952. Because of his superstitious fear that creating a will would hasten his death, Molnár left behind several manuscripts, unfinished work, and a significant amount of money. Lili attended his funeral with a few close friends. In the name of all women Molnár had loved, Darvas bid him farewell with a quotation: "Liliom, sleep my boy, sleep!"

== Bibliography ==
=== Plays ===
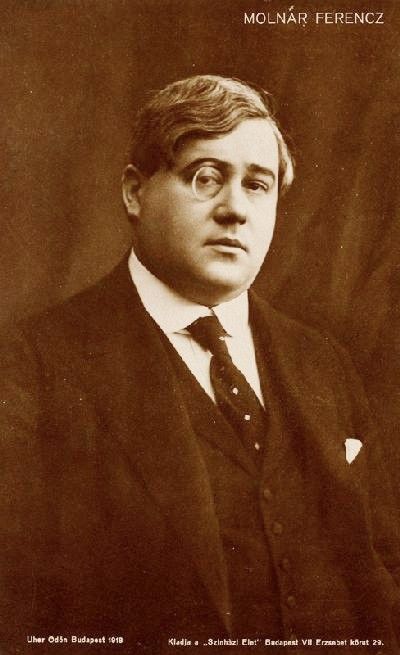
Portrait of Ferenc Molnár (1918)

- The Lawyer (1902)
- Jozsi (1904)
- The Devil (1907)
- Liliom (1909)
- Testőr (The Guardsman) (1910)
- The Tale of the Wolf (1912)
- The White Cloud (1916)
- Carnival (1916)
- Fashions for Men (1917)
- The Swan (1920)
- A Matter of Husbands (1923)
- Play at the Castle (1926)
- Olympia (1928)
- One two three (1929)
- The Good Fairy (1930)
- Delicate Story (1940)
- The King's Maid (1941)

=== Books ===
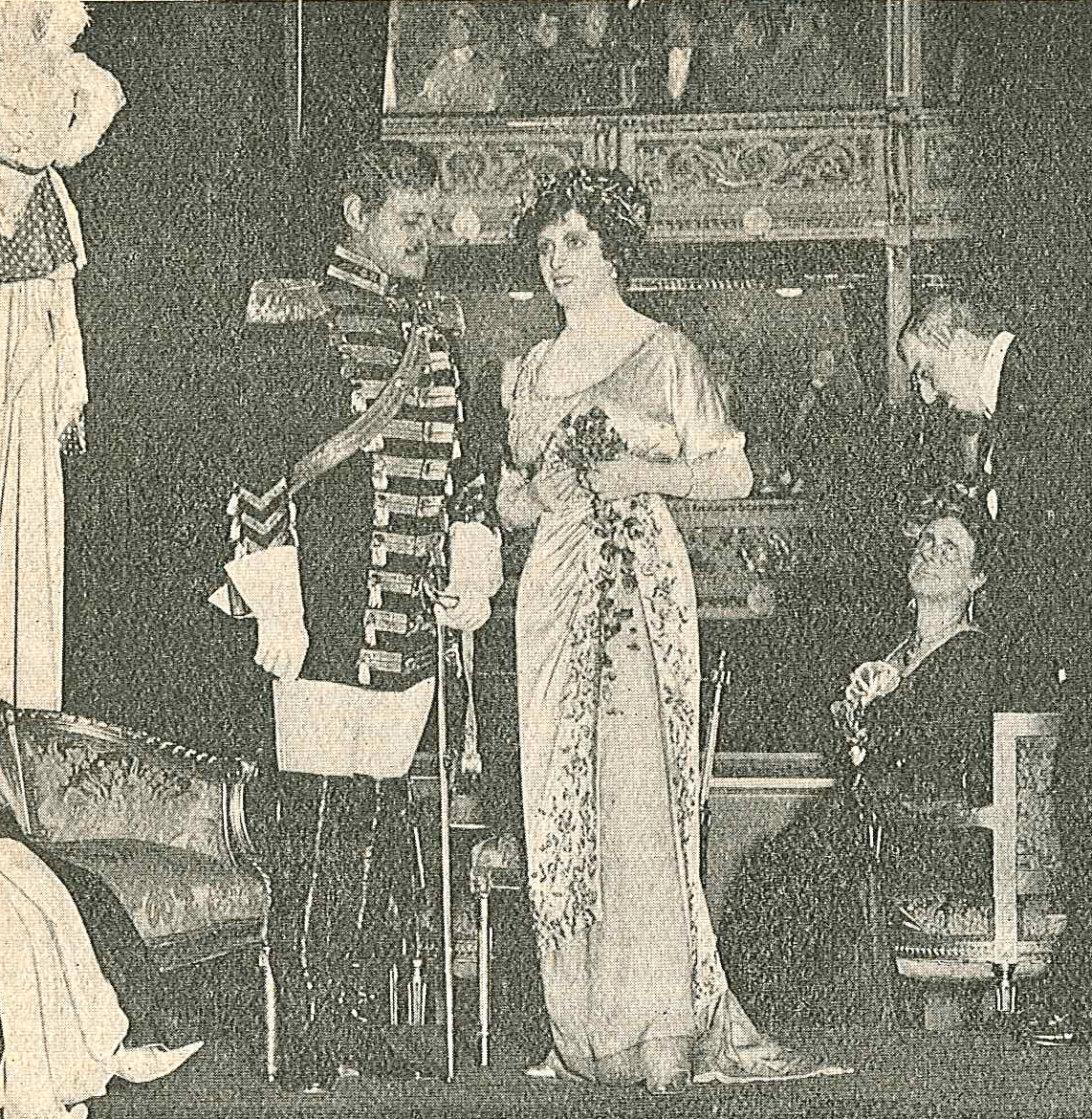
Scene from Act 2 of The Guardsman (1911)

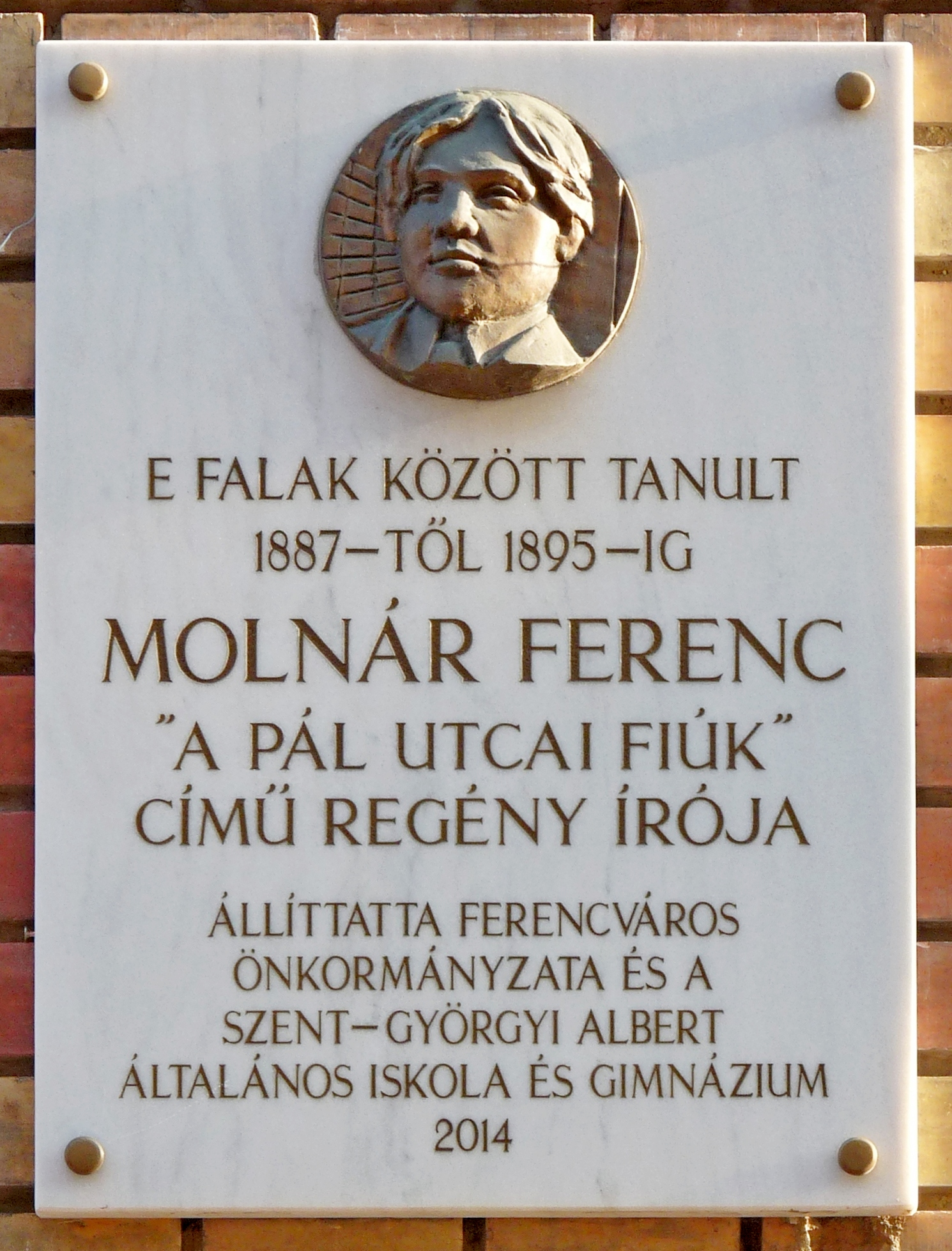
Plaque commemorating Molnár, on the wall of the primary school where he was a student from 1887 to 1895, by the sculptor Johanna Götz. It was unveiled on September 30, 2014.

- The Hungry City (1901)
- The Paul Street Boys (1906)
- The Memoirs of a War Correspondent (1916)
- The Captain of St. Margaret's (1926)
- Farewell My Heart (1945)
- Companion in Exile: Notes for an Autobiography (1950)

=== Other ===
- Molnár, Ferenc (1953). "Heavenly and earthly love". In Birmingham, Frederic A. (ed.). The girls from Esquire. London: Arthur Barker. pp. 219–223.
