= The Great War (1959 film) =

1959 Italian film by Mario Monicelli

The Great War (La Grande Guerra)
- Italian film poster
- Directed by: Mario Monicelli
- Written by: Agenore Incrocci; Mario Monicelli; Furio Scarpelli; Luciano Vincenzoni
- Produced by: Dino De Laurentiis
- Starring: Alberto Sordi; Vittorio Gassman; Folco Lulli; Bernard Blier; Romolo Valli; Silvana Mangano
- Cinematography: Giuseppe Rotunno; Leonida Barboni; Roberto Gerardi; Giuseppe Serrandi
- Edited by: Adriana Novelli
- Music by: Nino Rota
- Release date: September 1959 (premiere at VFF)
- Running time: 135 minutes
- Countries: Italy; France
- Language: Italian

The Great War (Italian: La grande guerra) is a 1959 Italian comedy-drama war film directed by Mario Monicelli. It tells the story of an odd couple of army buddies in World War I; the movie, while played on a comedic register, does not hide from the viewer the horrors and grimness of trench warfare. Starring Alberto Sordi and Vittorio Gassman and produced by Dino De Laurentiis, the film won the Golden Lion at the Venice Film Festival. Its crew also included Danilo Donati (costumes) and Mario Garbuglia (set designer).

It was an Academy Award nominee as Best Foreign Film. In 2008, the film was included on the Italian Ministry of Cultural Heritage's 100 Italian films to be saved, a list of 100 films that "have changed the collective memory of the country between 1942 and 1978." It won huge success outside Italy, especially in France.

== Plot ==
1916. The Roman Oreste Jacovacci (Alberto Sordi) and Giovanni Busacca from Milan (Vittorio Gassman) meet in a military district during the call to arms. The former deceives the other with a false promise to help him avoid conscription in exchange for money. The two meet again on a train to the front: after Giovanni's initial anger, they end up sympathizing and becoming friends. Although completely different in character, they are united by the lack of any ideal and the desire to avoid any danger in order to emerge unscathed from the war. After going through numerous vicissitudes during training, fighting and rare leave, they witness the Italian defeat at Caporetto. The following day, they are commanded as relay runners, a very dangerous task, which is entrusted to them because they are considered to be the "least efficient" of the troop.

One evening, after carrying out their mission, they fall asleep in the stable of an outpost not far from the front line, but a sudden advance of the Austrians leaves them in enemy territory. Surprised, they wear coats of the Austro-Hungarian army in an attempt to escape. They are captured, accused of espionage and threatened with shooting. Overwhelmed by fear, Oreste accidentally reveals that they have crucial information on the Italian counterattack on Piave river, and to save themselves, they decide to pass it on to the enemy. The arrogance of the Austrian officer and a joke of contempt for the Italians, however, offends them personally and restores strength to their dignity, leading them to keep the secret until the execution. Giovanni insults the Austrian officer, while Oreste shouts he is not aware of the information and is shot shortly after his friend.

The battle ends shortly after, with the victory of the Italian army and the reconquest of the position fallen into the hands of the Austrians. The film ends with Oreste and Giovanni's captain, who, unaware of their sacrifice, comments about their escape.

== Cast ==
- Alberto Sordi: Oreste Jacovacci
- Vittorio Gassman: Giovanni Busacca
- Silvana Mangano: Costantina
- Folco Lulli: Private Bordin
- Bernard Blier: Captain Castelli
- Romolo Valli: Lieutenant Gallina
- Vittorio Sanipoli: Major Venturi
- Nicola Arigliano: Private Giardino
- Geronimo Meynier: Messenger
- Mario Valdemarin: Lieutenant Loquenzi
- Elsa Vazzoler: Mrs. Bordin
- Tiberio Murgia: Private Rosario Nicotra
- Livio Lorenzon: Sergeant Battiferri
- Ferruccio Amendola: Private De Concini
- Gianni Baghino: A soldier
- Carlo D'Angelo: Captain Ferri
- Achille Compagnoni: Chaplain
- Luigi Fainelli: Private Giacomazzi
- Marcello Giorda: General
- Tiberio Mitri: Private Mandich
- Gérard Herter: Austrian captain
- Guido Celano: Italian major

== Analysis ==
The film is an ironic account of life in the trenches on the Italian front of World War I and the vicissitudes of a group of comrades fighting there in 1916. It is narrated in a simultaneously neorealist and romantic idiom, combining typical features of Italian comedy with attention to historical detail. One review wrote that it "realises a fusion, in some ways unsurpassed, through criticism dressed as comedy and the perspective of historical criticism capable of dealing with the past with the same lucidity and with the same anti-conformity as that shown by cinema following the eveolution of contemporary Italian society. Another review stated "Italian comedy was getting to grips with grand cinema and this had to pass through a direct contact with social reality and great labour in psychologically defining character.

The remarkable crowd scenes are accompanied by acute characterizations of many characters, human and fearful anti-heroes, resigned to their fate in solidarity with each other, united by their enforced participation in a disaster which in the end overwhelms them. Monicelli and his scriptwriters Age & Scarpelli and Luciano Vincenzoni reached the pinnacle of their careers with this film, combining artistic skill with unparalleled fluidity of storytelling, comedy and dramatic tone, and paving the way for a new style of war film. In the citation for an honorary degree from the University of Udine on 30 May 2005, Monicelli was rewarded "for his extraordinary contribution to [public] knowledge of Italian history through his films, particularly 'The Great War'. A master of cinematography and the course of history, but also ... a kind of master ... who taught us things we will remember for a lifetime."

The short final sequence shows the two main characters redeem themselves by making a small but courageous gesture of sacrifice, one as a "swaggering hero" and the other as a "heroic coward", the latter being Sordi's role, for which he won the Nastro d'Argento for Best Actor. One reviewer wrote:

In the end it will redeem them all, when cowardice will become honour and the spirit of belonging will prevails over selfishness, in a triumphal and optimistically patriotic ending which shrinks from the danger of falling into petty rhetoric, because it seals, just for once, the triumph of cowardice over courage. Perhaps this was not cowardice, but simply love for life."

The reconstruction of wartime life is, from a historical point of view, one of the best contributions by Italian cinema to the study of the First World War. For the first time a representation of that war was purged of the rhetoric of Fascist and Second World War propaganda, which continued the myth of Italy fighting a successful and heroic war, meaning The Great War had problems with the censors and banned for under 18s. One reviewer wrote "Its antirhetorical character brought press reactions right from the start of filming, but its public success contributed more than anything else to the de-mythologising of patriotic and romantic historiography which had always clouded the massacre that was the First World War under the oratory of ardour and sacrifice." Until then Italian soldiers had always been portrayed as courageous and willing men sacrificing themselves for their country. The film also denounces the absurdity and violence of the conflict and the miserable living conditions of civilians and soldiers, but also speaks strongly about the friendships which grew up among soldiers from very different classes, cultures and regions of Italy. Forced to live side by side, the soldiers' regional rivalries and provincial nature, never thrown together before for so long, helps to partly form a national spirit that before then was nearly non-existent, in strong contrast to Italy's commanders and institutions, which are shown as the main things to blame for the war.

== Production ==
The film was born out of an idea by Luciano Vincenzoni, influenced by "Two friends", a story by Guy de Maupassant. Initially thought of as a star vehicle just for Gassman, it was the producer De Laurentiis who decided to add another character, played by Sordi. The screenplay combined characters and situations from two famous books – "A Year on the Plateau" by Emilio Lussu and "Con me e con gli alpini" by Piero Jahier. In an interview, the director himself stated:

Lussu and Jahier are considered as the film's two screenwriters. In particular I turned to Lussu, saying that he deserved to be rewarded for the borrowings from his book, but (perhaps because he was convinced Italian comedy was rubbish) he told me that he would have nothing to do with it and we could realise the film just as we liked

The journalist and writer Carlo Salsa, who had actually fought in these areas in the First World War, was a script consultant, helping with the story, dialogue and background, all particularly vivid and original. The scenes were mostly shot in the province of Udine, at Gemona del Friuli, near Venzone, at Sella Sant'Agnese, in the fort at Palmanova and in the Nespoledo district of Lestizza from 25 May to mid-June 1959. Other scenes were filmed in Campania at San Pietro Infine.

== Reception ==
=== Critical response ===
The Great War has an approval rating of 40% on review aggregator website Rotten Tomatoes, based on 5 reviews, and an average rating of 8/10.

=== Nominations ===
- Academy Award for Best Foreign Film

=== Wins ===
- Golden Lion at the Venice Film Festival (1959)
- David di Donatello for Best Producer (1960)
- David di Donatello for Best Actor (Gassmann and Sordi jointly) (1960)
- Nastro d'Argento Best Design (Mario Garbuglia) (1960)
- Nastro d'Argento for Best Actor (Sordi) (1960)

== See also ==
- List of submissions to the 32nd Academy Awards for Best Foreign Language Film
- List of Italian submissions for the Academy Award for Best Foreign Language Film
- List of anti-war films
