= Parsifal Bassi =

Italian actor, screenwriter, and film director

- Born: 15 December 1892; Bologna, Emilia-Romagna, Italy
- Died: 10 January 1960 (aged 67); Bologna, Emilia-Romagna, Italy
- Occupations: Writer, Actor, Director
- Years active: 1920-1943 (film)

Parsifal Bassi (1892–1960) was an Italian actor, screenwriter and film director.

== Selected filmography ==
- La porta del mondo (1921)
- Anadiomene (1922)
- Cardinal Lambertini (1934)
- Rossini (1942)
- Gioco d'azzardo (1943)

== Bibliography ==
- Mancini, Elaine. Struggles of the Italian film industry during fascism, 1930-1935. UMI Research Press, 1985.
