= Ermete Zacconi =

Italian actor (1857–1948)

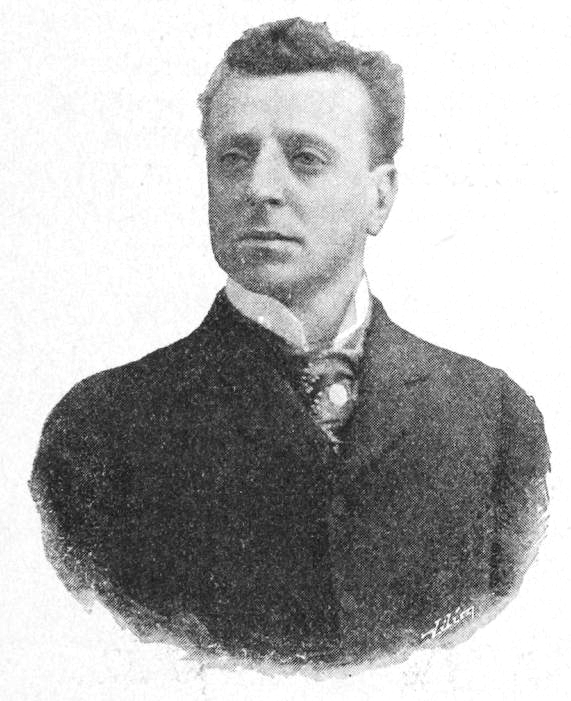
- Born: 14 September 1857; Montecchio Emilia, Italy
- Died: 14 October 1948 (aged 91); Viareggio, Italy
- Occupation: Actor
- Spouse: Ines Cristina
- Children: Ernes Zacconi (daughter); Margherita Bagni (step-daughter)

Ermete Zacconi (14 September 1857, Montecchio Emilia, Province of Reggio Emilia – 14 October 1948 in Viareggio) was an Italian stage and film actor and a representative of naturalism and verism in acting. His leading ladies on stage were his wife Ines Cristina and Paola Pezzaglia.

His wife Ines Cristina was born into a family of theater actors to Maltese actor Raffaello Cristina and Italian actress Cesira Sabatini. The actor Olinto Cristina and the actresses Ada Cristina Almirante and Jone Frigerio were her siblings. She was previously married to prompter Ambrogio Bagni (pseudonym of Ambrogio Bagna) with whom she had had a daughter Margherita Bagni, also an actress. Zacconi and his wife had a daughter together Ernes Zacconi.

He had lead roles in plays by William Shakespeare, Carlo Goldoni, Alfred de Musset, Henrik Ibsen, August Strindberg. He also performed in films. His most notable film roles include L'emigrante (1915), Cardinal Lambertini (1934), Summer Rain (1937), The Pearls of the Crown (1937), Processo e morte di Socrate (1939), and Le Comte de Monte Cristo (1943).

== Filmography ==
Year	Title	Role	Notes
1915	L'emigrante	Antonio, l'emigrante	
1918	Gli spettri		
1918	La forza della coscienza		
1934	Cardinal Lambertini	Cardinal Lambertini	
1936	Cuor di vagabondo	Babblo Larue	
1937	The Pearls of the Crown	Le pape Clement VII	
1937	Summer Rain		
1939	Processo e morte di Socrate	Socrate	
1941	Orizzonte dipinto	Il vecchio grande attore	
1941	Don Buonaparte	Don Geronimo Buonaparte	
1942	Il romanzo di un giovane povero	Augusto Laroche	
1942	Piazza San Sepolcro		
1943	Le Comte de Monte Cristo	L'abbé Faria	(final film role)
