= Summer Rain (1937 film) =

1937 film

- Directed by: Mario Monicelli
- Written by: Mario Monicelli; Luciano Zacconi
- Starring: Raniero Barsanti
- Cinematography: Manfredo Bertini; Luciano Zacconi
- Edited by: Mario Monicelli
- Release date: 31 July 1937
- Running time: 65 minutes
- Country: Italy
- Language: Italian

Summer Rain (Italian: Pioggia d'estate) is a 1937 Italian comedy film directed by Mario Monicelli. It was his first full-length feature film.

== Cast ==
- Raniero Barsanti
- Franca Taylor
- Ermete Zacconi
- Ernes Zacconi
