= When a Man's a Man (1935 film) =

1935 film by Edward F. Cline

- Theatrical release poster
- Directed by: Edward F. Cline
- Screenplay by: Frank Mitchell Dazey; Agnes Christine Johnston
- Produced by: Sol Lesser; John Zanft
- Starring: George O'Brien; Dorothy Wilson; Paul Kelly; Harry Woods; Jimmy Butler; Richard Carlyle
- Cinematography: Frank B. Good
- Edited by: W. Donn Hayes
- Production company: Fox Film Corporation
- Distributed by: Fox Film Corporation
- Release date: February 15, 1935
- Running time: 68 minutes
- Country: United States
- Language: English

When a Man's a Man is a 1935 American Western film directed by Edward F. Cline and written by Frank Mitchell Dazey and Agnes Christine Johnston. The film stars George O'Brien, Dorothy Wilson, Paul Kelly, Harry Woods, Jimmy Butler and Richard Carlyle. The film was released on February 15, 1935, by Fox Film Corporation.

Parts of the film were shot in Zion National Park.

== Cast ==
- George O'Brien as Larry Knight
- Dorothy Wilson as Kitty Baldwin
- Paul Kelly as Phil Acton
- Harry Woods as Nick Gambert
- Jimmy Butler as Newsboy Jimmy
- Richard Carlyle as Dean Baldwin
- Clarence Wilson as Garvey
- Edgar Norton as Servant Gibbs
