= Jimmy Butler (actor) =

American actor (1921–1945)

- Born: February 20, 1921; Akron, Ohio, U.S.
- Died: February 18, 1945 (aged 23); Theding, France
- Cause of death: Killed in action
- Resting place: Epinal American Cemetery and Memorial, Dinozé, France
- Occupation: Actor
- Years active: 1933–1943
- Spouse: Jean Fahrney (m. 1941)

Jimmy Butler (February 20, 1921 – February 18, 1945) was an American, juvenile, motion-pictures actor, active in the 1930s and early 1940s.

Butler was the son of Mr. and Mrs. Merrill W. Butler. He gained early acting experience at the Pasadena Community Playhouse.

Butler earned acclaim for his role in the 1933 film Only Yesterday, his screen debut, and in 1934 his career got another significant boost when the actor earned lavish critical plaudits for his portrayal of Jim Wade in Manhattan Melodrama. Later he played one of the young protagonists, Boka, in No Greater Glory.

On February 15, 1941, Butler married singer Jean Fahrney. They initially kept the marriage secret, but it became known in March 1941. They remained wed until his death.

In 1945, Butler died in World War II combat in the town of Theding, France.

== Filmography ==
- Only Yesterday (1933) - Jim Jr.
- Beloved (1934) - Charles Hausmann, as a boy
- No Greater Glory (1934) - Boka
- Manhattan Melodrama (1934) - Jim - as a Boy
- Mrs. Wiggs of the Cabbage Patch (1934) - Billy Wiggs
- I'll Fix It (1934) - Bobby Grimes
- Romance in Manhattan (1935) - Frank Dennis
- When a Man's a Man (1935) - Jimmy - Newsboy
- Laddie (1935) - Leon Stanton
- Dinky (1935) - Cadet Lane
- The Awakening of Jim Burke (1935) - Jimmy Burke
- The Dark Angel (1935) - Gerald as a Child (uncredited)
- Show Them No Mercy! (1935) - Boy at Service Station (uncredited)
- Battle of Greed (1937) - Danny Storm
- Stella Dallas (1937) - Con Morrison - Grown Up
- County Fair (1937) - Buddy Williams - Julie's Brother
- Wells Fargo (1937) - Nick Pryor Jr. (uncredited)
- The Shopworn Angel (1938) - Jack - Elevator Boy (uncredited)
- Boys Town (1938) - Paul Ferguson
- Winter Carnival (1939) - Larry Grey
- Nurse Edith Cavell (1939) - Jean
- The Escape (1939) - Jim Rogers
- Call a Messenger (1939) - Bob Prichard
- Star Dust (1940) - Minor Role (uncredited)
- Golden Gloves (1940) - Willie Burke (uncredited)
- Military Academy (1940) - Cadet Dewey
- Naval Academy (1941) - Matt Cooper
- Rise and Shine (1941) - Student Manager (uncredited)
- Uncle Joe (1941) - Bob
- Tough As They Come (1942) - Gene Bennett
- The Hard Way (1943) - Boy (uncredited)
- This Is the Army (1943) - Soldier (uncredited)
- Someone to Remember (1943) - Bob Edgar (uncredited)
- Corvette K-225 (1943) - Rating (uncredited)
- Girl Crazy (1943) - Student (uncredited) (final film role)
