= Alfredo Testoni =

Italian playwright

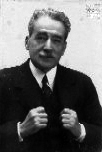
- Born: 11 October 1856; Bologna, Emilia-Romagna, Italy
- Died: 17 December 1931 (aged 75); Bologna, Emilia-Romagna, Italy
- Occupation: Writer

Alfredo Testoni (1856–1931) was an Italian playwright and poet known for his work in the Bolognese dialect. In 1888 he established his own company at the Teatro Contavalli in Bologna. Among his best known plays is Cardinal Lambertini, a 1905 work set in eighteenth century Bologna. A number of his works have been adapted for film and television.

== Bibliography ==
- Farrell, Joseph & Puppa, Paolo A History of Italian Theatre. Cambridge University Press, 2006.
- Goble, Alan. The Complete Index to Literary Sources in Film. Walter de Gruyter, 1999.
