= St. Paul Street =

St. Paul Street may refer to:

- St. Paul Street (Baltimore) in Maryland, United States
- Saint Paul Street station, a light rail station in Massachusetts, United States
- Saint Paul Street station (MBTA Green Line B branch), a former light rail station in Massachusetts, United States
- Rue Saint-Paul (Montreal) in Montreal, Quebec, Canada
- A portion of Niagara Regional Road 81 in Saint Catharines, Ontario, Canada
