= List of Italian films of 1951 =

A list of films produced in Italy in 1951 (see 1951 in film):

== List of films (in alphabetical order) ==
=== A ===
Title	Director	Cast	Genre	Notes
1951
Abbiamo vinto!	Robert A. Stemmle	Paolo Stoppa, Walter Chiari	Comedy	
Accidenti alle tasse!!	Mario Mattoli	Riccardo Billi, Mario Riva, Dorian Gray	Comedy	
Achtung! Banditi!	Carlo Lizzani	Gina Lollobrigida, Andrea Checchi, Lamberto Maggiorani	War	
Amo un assassino	Baccio Bandini	Umberto Spadaro, Delia Scala, Andrea Bosic, Marco Vicario	Crime drama	
Amor non ho... però... però	Giorgio Bianchi	Renato Rascel, Gina Lollobrigida	Comedy	
Un Animale utile	Antonio Marchi			
Anna	Alberto Lattuada	Silvana Mangano, Raf Vallone, Vittorio Gassman	Pink neorrealism	Major success. Director Nanni Moretti made a tribute to Mangano's dance in Caro diario
Appunti su un fatto di cronaca	Luchino Visconti		Documentary	
Arrivano i nostri	Mario Mattoli	Mario Riva, Riccardo Billi	Comedy	
Atoll K	Leo Joannon	Stan Laurel, Oliver Hardy, Suzy Delair	Comedy	French/Italian co-production
Atto d'accusa	Giacomo Gentilomo	Lea Padovani, Marcello Mastroianni	Melodrama	
Auguri e figli maschi!	Giorgio Simonelli	Delia Scala, Maria Grazia Francia		

=== B–D ===
Title	Director	Cast	Genre	Notes
Bambini	Francesco Maselli			
Beauties in Capri	Adelchi Bianchi	Nando Bruno, Ave Ninchi	Comedy	
Behind Closed Shutters	Luigi Comencini	Massimo Girotti, Eleonora Rossi Drago	Drama	
Bellissima	Luchino Visconti	Anna Magnani, Walter Chiari, Tina Apicella, Tecla Scarano, Alessandro Blasetti	Italian neorealism	Dreams with Cinecittà and film stardom
The Black Captain	Alberto Pozzetti, Giorgio Ansoldi	Steve Barclay, Marina Berti, Marisa Merlini	Adventure	
Il Blues della domenica sera	Valerio Zurlini		Documentary	
Brief Rapture	Enzo Trapani	Amedeo Nazzari, Lois Maxwell, Umberto Spadaro	Drama	
Briscola				
Una Bruna indiavolata	Carlo Ludovico Bragaglia	Silvana Pampanini, Ugo Tognazzi	Comedy	
Buon viaggio pover'uomo	Giorgio Pastina	Umberto Spadaro, Vera Carmi	Drama	
Il Caimano del Piave	Giorgio Bianchi	Gino Cervi, Milly Vitale	War drama	
Cameriera bella presenza offresi...	Giorgio Pastina	Elsa Merlini, Gino Cervi, Alberto Sordi		
Il Cammino di una grande amica	Lino Lionello Ghirardini		Documentary	
The Cape of Hope	Raymond Bernard	Edwige Feuillère, Frank Villard	Crime	Co-production with France
The Captain of Venice	Gianni Puccini	Leonardo Cortese, Mariella Lotti	Adventure	
Carcerato	Armando Grottini	Otello Toso, Franca Marzi	Melodrama	
I Castelli dell'Emilia			Documentary	
Comacchio piange				
Cops and Robbers	Steno, Mario Monicelli	Totò, Aldo Fabrizi, Ave Ninchi, Rossana Podestà	Comedy	Close to Italian neorealism. Troubles with censorship. Great success
Core 'ngrato				
The Counterfeiters	Franco Rossi	Fosco Giachetti, Doris Duranti, Lianella Carell	Crime	
The Crossroads	Fernando Cerchio	Raf Vallone, Claudine Dupuis	Crime	
Delta Padano				
Destiny	Enzo Di Gianni	Eva Nova, Renato Valente	Drama	
I Due derelitti	Flavio Calzavara	Massimo Serato, Yves Deniaud	Melodrama	
Le Due verità	Antonio Leonviola	Anna Maria Ferrero, Michel Auclair	Drama	French/Italian co-production

=== E–L ===
Title	Director	Cast	Genre	Notes
Colpa del sole	Alberto Moravia	Strelsa Brown		
Era lui... sì! sì!	Marino Girolami, Vittorio Metz; Marcello Marchesi	Walter Chiari, Isa Barzizza	Comedy	
Feathers in the Wind	Ugo Amadoro	Leonardo Cortese, Mario Ferrari	Comedy	
Fiamme sulla laguna		Leonardo Cortese, Lea Padovani		
I Figli di nessuno	Raffaello Matarazzo	Amedeo Nazzari, Yvonne Sanson	Drama	
Filumena Marturano	Eduardo De Filippo	Eduardo De Filippo, Titina De Filippo		
Fiorenzo, il terzo uomo	Stefano Canzio	Aldo Fabrizi, Renato Rascel		
La Folla	Silvio Laurenti Rosa	Marie Glory, Tino Buazzelli		
The Forbidden Christ	Curzio Malaparte	Raf Vallone, Anna Maria Ferrero	Drama	The only film famous Italian writer Curzio Malaparte made. Berlin Award
Four Red Roses	Nunzio Malasomma	Olga Villi, Jean-Claude Pascal, Fosco Giachetti	Melodrama	
Four Ways Out	Pietro Germi	Gina Lollobrigida, Renato Baldini	Crime	
Fugitive in Trieste	Guido Salvini	Doris Duranti, Jacques Sernas	Drama	
Fuoco nero	Silvio Siano	Otello Toso, Franca Marzi		
Goya				
La Grande rinuncia	Aldo Vergano	Lea Padovani, Luigi Tosi	Drama	
Ha fatto tredici	Carlo Manzoni	Carlo Croccolo, Riccardo Billi	Comedy	
Honeymoon Deferred	Mario Camerini	Sally Ann Howes, Lea Padovani	Comedy	Co-production with Britain
I'm the Capataz	Giorgio Simonelli	Renato Rascel, Silvana Pampanini, Marilyn Buferd	Comedy western	
It's Love That's Ruining Me	Mario Soldati	Walter Chiari, Lucia Bosè, Aroldo Tieri	Comedy	
Last Meeting	Gianni Franciolini	Alida Valli, Amedeo Nazzari	Drama	
The Last Sentence	Mario Bonnard	Charles Vanel, Antonella Lualdi	Melodrama	
Una Lettera dall'Africa	Leonardo Bonzi		Documentary	
Libera uscita	Duilio Coletti	Nino Taranto, Ludmilla Dudarova	Comedy	
Licenza premio	Max Neufeld	Nino Taranto, Carlo Croccolo	Comedy	
Lorenzaccio	Raffaello Pacini	Giorgio Albertazzi, Anna Maria Ferrero	Historical	
Love and Blood	Marino Girolami	Maria Montez, Massimo Serato	Crime	Italian/German co-production
The Lovers of Ravello	Luigi Capuano	Lída Baarová, Ivana Ferri, Gabriele Ferzetti	Melodrama	

=== M–Q ===
Title	Director	Cast	Genre	Notes
Malavita	Rate Furlan	Jacqueline Pierreux, Aldo Nicodemi, Franco Silva	Drama	
Mamma Mia, What an Impression!	Roberto Savarese	Alberto Sordi, Giovanna Pala, Carlo Giustini	Comedy	
Matrimonio alla moda	Luciano Emmer			Short film
The Medium	Gian Carlo Menotti	Marie Powers, Leopoldo Savona	Drama	Entered into the 1952 Cannes Film Festival and also screened at the 1987 Festival
Messalina	Carmine Gallone	María Félix, Georges Marchal	Historical	
Metano				
Il Microfono è vostro	Giuseppe Bennati	Aroldo Tieri, Gisella Sofio	Comedy	
Milano miliardaria	Marino Girolami, Vittorio Metz; Marcello Marchesi	Tino Scotti, Isa Barzizza	Comedy	
Les Miracles n'ont lieu qu'une fois	Yves Allégret	Alida Valli, Jean Marais		French/Italian co-production
Miracle in Milan (Miracolo a Milano)	Vittorio De Sica	Emma Gramatica, Francesco Golisano, Paolo Stoppa	Italian neorealism	Palme d'Or winner
Miracle in Viggiù	Luigi Giachino	Teddy Reno, Silvana Pampanini, Antonella Lualdi	Comedy	
Il Monello della strada	Carlo Borghesio	Erminio Macario	Comedy	
Mr. Peek-a-Boo	Jean Boyer	Bourvil, Joan Greenwood	Comedy	Co-production with France
My Heart Sings	Mario Mattoli	Ferruccio Tagliavini, Franca Marzi	Comedy	
The Mysteries of Venice	Ignazio Ferronetti	Virginia Belmont, Renato Valente, Tito Schipa	Drama	
Napoleon	Carlo Borghesio	Renato Rascel, Marisa Merlini	Comedy	
O.K. Nerone	Mario Soldati	Gino Cervi, Silvana Pampanini	Comedy	
Operation Mitra	Giorgio Cristallini	Steve Barclay, Marina Berti	Thriller	
Othello	Orson Welles	Orson Welles, Suzanne Cloutier, Robert Coote	Tragedy	
Paris Is Always Paris	Luciano Emmer	Aldo Fabrizi, Jeannette Batti	Comedy	Co-production with France
The Passaguai Family	Aldo Fabrizi	Aldo Fabrizi, Ave Ninchi, Peppino De Filippo	Comedy	
Patto d'amicizia				
La Paura fa 90	Giorgio Simonelli	Silvana Pampanini, Ugo Tognazzi	Comedy	
Perdizione				
Porca miseria	Giorgio Bianchi	Carlo Croccolo, Francesco Golisano	Comedy	
Quelli che soffrono per voi	Alessandro Blasetti		Documentary	
Red Moon	Armando Fizzarotti	Renato Baldini, Maria Frau	Melodrama	
The Reluctant Magician	Marino Girolami	Tino Scotti, Isa Barzizza	Comedy	
Revenge of Black Eagle	Riccardo Freda	Rossano Brazzi, Gianna Maria Canale	Adventure	
Revenge of the Pirates	Primo Zeglio	Maria Montez, Jean-Pierre Aumont	Adventure	
The Rival of the Empress	Jacopo Comin, Sidney Salkow	Richard Greene, Valentina Cortese	Adventure	
Rome-Paris-Rome	Luigi Zampa	Aldo Fabrizi, Sophie Desmarets	Comedy	

=== S–Z ===
Title	Director	Cast	Genre	Notes
Salvate mia figlia		Bianca Doria, Juan de Landa	Melodrama	
Sangue al sole	Henri Colpi	Nelly Borgeaud, Françoise Brion	Drama	
Santa Lucia Luntana (film)				
The Seven Dwarfs to the Rescue	Paolo W. Tamburella	Rossana Podestà, Georges Marchal	Comedy	
Seven Hours of Trouble	Vittorio Metz, Marcello Marchesi	Totò, Isa Barzizza, Carlo Campanini	Comedy	
Shadows on the Grand Canal	Glauco Pellegrini	Isa Pola, Antonio Centa, Elena Zareschi	Crime	
Song of Spring	Mario Costa	Leonardo Cortese, Delia Scala, Tamara Lees	Drama	
Sport minore	Francesco Maselli		Documentary	
Stasera sciopero	Mario Bonnard	Virgilio Riento, Marisa Merlini	Comedy	
The Steamship Owner	Mario Mattoli	Walter Chiari, Delia Scala, Carlo Campanini	Comedy	
Stracciaroli				
Three Forbidden Stories	Augusto Genina	Lia Amanda, Antonella Lualdi	Comedy	
Three Steps North	W. Lee Wilder	Lloyd Bridges, Lea Padovani	Crime	Co-production with the US
Tizio, Caio, Sempronio				
Tomorrow Is Another Day	Léonide Moguy	Pier Angeli, Anna Maria Ferrero, Rossana Podestà	Pink neorealism	Sequel of Tomorrow Is Too Late
Toto and the King of Rome	Mario Monicelli, Steno	Totò, Alberto Sordi	Comedy	
Toto the Third Man	Mario Mattoli	Totò, Franca Marzi	Comedy	
Tragic Serenade	Carlo Giusitini	Ignazio Balsamo, Carlo Giustini	Comedy	
Tragic Spell	Mario Sequi	María Félix, Rossano Brazzi, Emma Gramatica	Drama	
Trieste mia!	Mario Costa	Milly Vitale, Ermanno Randi	Drama	
The Two Sergeants	Carlo Alberto Chiesa	Mario Carotenuto, Antonella Lualdi	Comedy	
Gli Uomini non guardano il cielo	Umberto Scarpelli	Tullio Carminati, Isa Miranda	Drama	
Vacation with a Gangster	Dino Risi	Marc Lawrence, Giovanna Pala	Comedy	
Viaggio sentimentale a Roma				
Without a Flag	Lionello De Felice	Massimo Serato, Umberto Spadaro	Spy drama	
The Young Caruso	Giacomo Gentilomo	Ermanno Randi, Gina Lollobrigida	Biopic	
Zona pericolosa	Francesco Maselli		Documentary	
