= Mizar (Sabotaggio in mare) =

1954 film

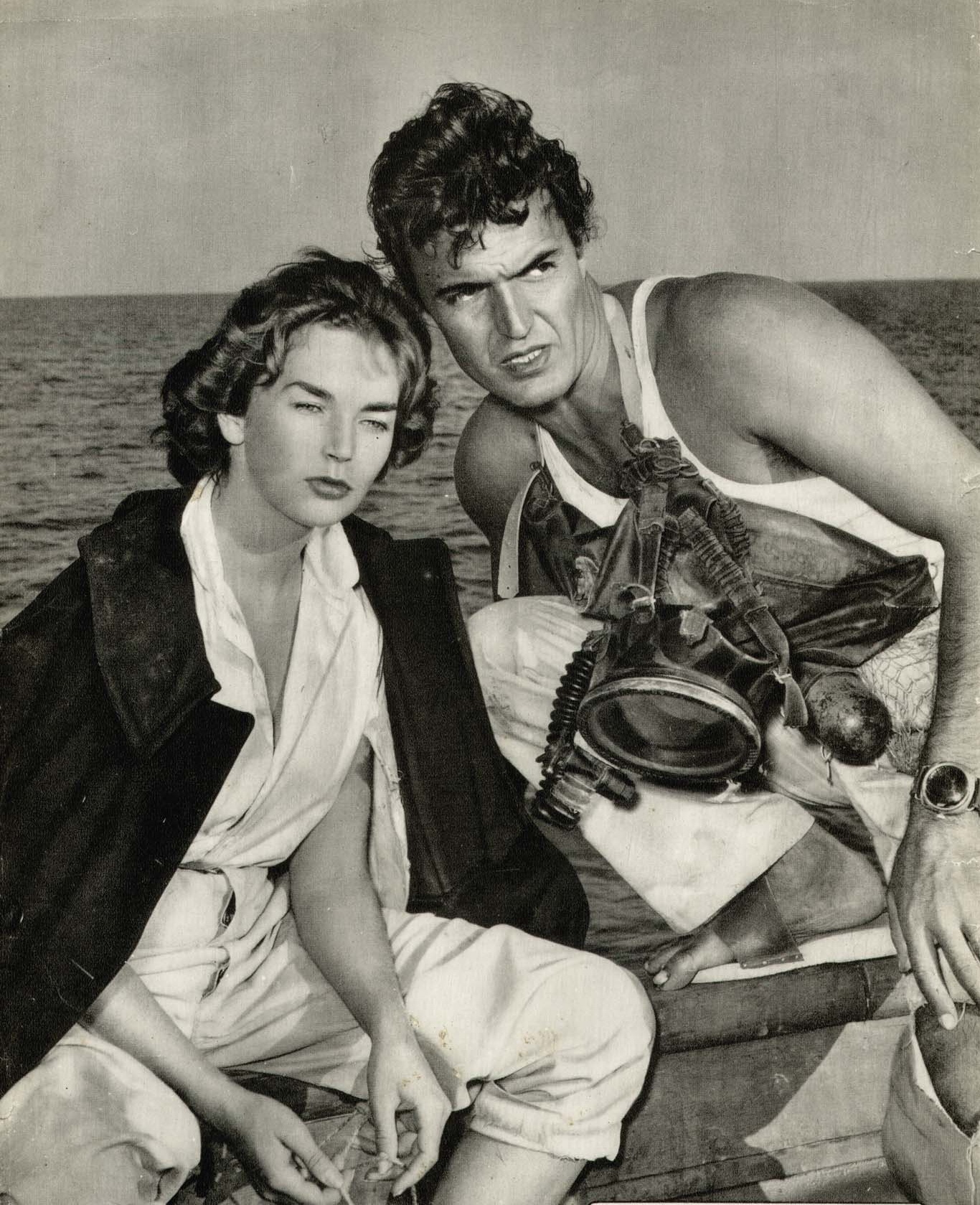
Dawn Addams and Franco Silva

Mizar or Mizar (Sabotaggio in mare) (Mizar (Sabotage at sea)) is a 1954 Italian war film directed by Francesco De Robertis. It is notable as the second of only two films produced by Film Costellazione. It was released in France as Mizar (Sabotage en mer), the United Kingdom as Frogman Spy and in the US as The Woman Who Came from the Sea or Frogwoman. It is loosely based on the World War II actions of the naval officer Luigi Ferraro.

== Production ==
Its cast includes Silvana Jachino, Antonio Centa and Lia Di Leo. It also marked the second appearances of Charles Fernley Fawcett and Paolo Stoppa, two of the few actors De Robertis used in more than one film.

The cinematographer was Carlo Bellero with his usual camera operator Dino Reni (Bernardo Procacci). The score was by Annibale Bizzelli and costumes by Marilù Carteny. Film editing was by Eraldo Da Roma, who also worked with De Robertis on La nave Bianca (1941) and Uomini ombra (1954).

== Plot ==
The Italian Royal Navy gives dangerous assignments to the Italian naval officer and diver Luigi Ferri (Franco Silva), who is assisted by a woman scuba-diver named Mizar (Dawn Addams). He recovers a codebook from an enemy ship before going on a secret mission to Turkey and sinking merchant ships carrying weapons, whilst the British attempt to hunt down the couple.
