= Carlo Bellero =

Italian cinematographer

Carlo Bellero (Rome, 15 May 1911– Rome, 31 May 1988) was an Italian cinematographer active between 1941 and 1964. He is notable for his work with several directors, including Giorgio Simonelli, Turi Vasile, Ermanno Olmi, Mario Amendola, Domenico Paolella, Giorgio Capitani and Francesco De Robertis (La nave bianca and Uomini sul fondo).

== Selected filmography ==
- The Lovers of Ravello (1951)
- Drama on the Tiber (1952)
- The Angel of Sin (1952)
