= Vistarini =

Vistarini is an Italian surname. Notable people with the surname include:

- Carla Vistarini (born 1948), Italian lyricist, writer, playwright, and scriptwriter
- Patrizia Vistarini (born 1950), known as Mita Medici, Italian actress, singer, model, and TV personality
