= Women in Arms =

- Directed by: Sergio Corbucci
- Written by: Sergio Corbucci; Gianni Romoli; Stefano Sudriè
- Starring: Lina Sastri
- Cinematography: Sergio D'Offizi
- Edited by: Ruggero Mastroianni
- Music by: Manuel De Sica
- Release date: 1991
- Country: Italy
- Language: Italian

Women in Arms (also known as Donne armate) is 1991 Italian television action-drama film directed by Sergio Corbucci. It was Corbucci's final work.

== Plot ==
Nadia Cossa is a political prisoner who manages to escape during a transfer to a new prison. The young policewoman who was escorting her is suspended but starts investigating on her behalf and follows her trail.

== Cast ==
- Lina Sastri as Nadia Cossa
- Cristina Marsillach as Angela Venturi
- Donald Pleasence as Dreyfuss
- Franco Interlenghi as the prosecutor
- Massimo Bonetti as Marco La Valle
- Glauco Onorato as Locasciulli
- Mariangela Giordano as Miss Locasciulli
- Cochi Ponzoni as Luigi Russo
- Biagio Pelligra as Antonio Guidotti
- Imma Piro as Angela's sister
- Lucio Rosato as Luigi Cosantini
- Marzio Honorato as Renzi
- Vassili Karis as the killer
- Arnaldo Ninchi as the blind man
- Raffaella Baracchi as Cora Cardinali
- Adriana Russo as Clara

== Production ==
The film was co-produced by Fulvio Lucisano, Rai 2 and Odeon TV, marking the first co-production between RAI and a private television channel. It had a budget of about 6 billion lire.

== Release ==
The film was broadcast on Rai 2 in two parts on 9–10 January 1991, about a month after Corbucci's death.
