= Turri il bandito =

- Directed by: Enzo Trapani
- Written by: Enzo Trapani; Bitto Albertini; Adriano Bolzoni
- Cinematography: Bitto Albertini
- Music by: Vincenzo Falcomatà
- Release date: 1950
- Country: Italy
- Language: Italian

Turri il bandito is a 1950 Italian crime-drama film written and directed by Enzo Trapani.

== Cast ==
- Nino Crisman as Turri
- Lilia Landi
- Ermanno Randi
- Dody Ristori
- Massimo Sallusti
- Vittorio Sanipoli
- Amedeo Trilli
