= Lettera aperta a un giornale della sera =

1970 Italian film

- Directed by: Francesco Maselli
- Written by: Francesco Maselli
- Produced by: Franco Cristaldi
- Cinematography: Gerardo Patrizi
- Edited by: Rolando Salvatori
- Music by: Giovanna Marini
- Production companies: Ital-Noleggio Cinematografico; Vides Cinematografica
- Distributed by: Ital-Noleggio Cinematografico
- Release date: March 1970
- Running time: 121 minutes
- Country: Italy
- Language: Italian

Lettera aperta a un giornale della sera (English titles Open Letter to an Evening Daily and Open Letter to the Evening News) is a 1970 Italian drama film written and directed by Francesco Maselli. The film follows the crisis of a group of Communist intellectuals against the background of the Vietnam War.

== Cast ==
- Nanni Loy: Vanni Dosi
- Mariella Palmich: Dosi's mistress
- Piero Faggioni: Faggioni
- Graziella Galvani: Graziella, Faggioni's wife
- Daniele Dublino: Dublino
- Laura De Marchi: Dublino's wife
- Daniela Surina: Dublino's mistress
- Francesco Maselli: Saverio
- Goliarda Sapienza: Saverio's ex-wife
- Massimo Sarchielli: Sculptor
- Titina Maselli: Sculptor's wife
- Nino Dal Fabbro: Professor Nino Dal Fabbro
- Lorenza Guerrieri: Lorenza, Dal Fabbro's wife
- Monica Strebel: Monica, Dal Fabbro's ex-mistress
- Renato Romano: Screenwriter
- Anna Orso: Screenwriter's wife
- Luciano Telli: Director
- Nicole Karen: Director's wife
- Claudia Rittore: Director's daughter
- Silverio Blasi: Brandi
- Barry Fiefield: Pier Maria, publisher
- Deanna Frosini: Editor's wife
- Vittorio Duse: Butler
- Fabienne Fabre: Student
- Daniele Costantini: Student
- Riccardo Berlingieri: Student
- Gianni Sbarra
- Berto Pelosso
- Bitti Lusignoli
- Tanya Lopert: Dyana Stein
- Gabor Acs: Journalist
- Paolo Pietrangeli: Singer
- Randy Lind
- Nicole Tessier
- Maurizio Ponzi
- Marcello Di Martire

== Production and release ==
Lettera aperta a un giornale della sera was shot on 16 mm film in 1968 and 1969 and released in 1970.
