= Enzo Decaro =

Italian actor, comedian, & screenwriter (born 1958)

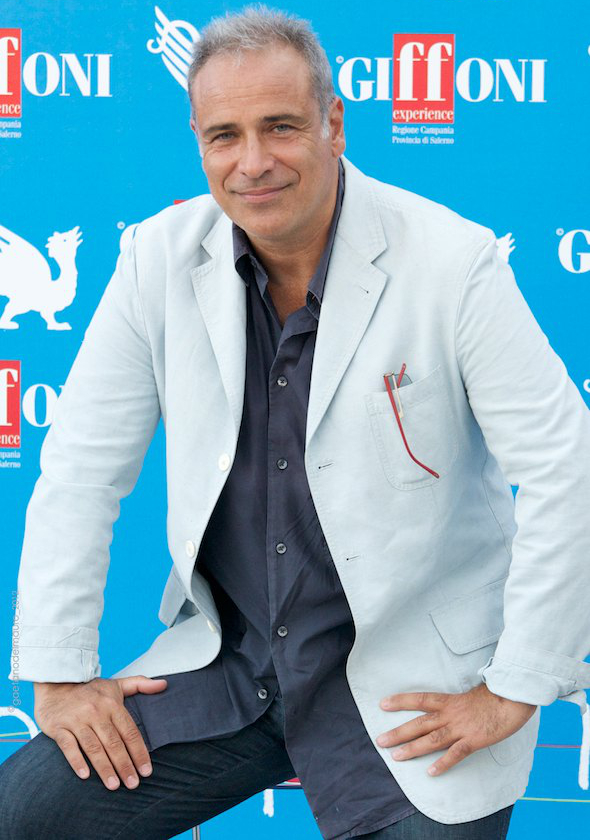
- Decaro at the Giffoni Film Festival, 2012
- Born: March 24, 1958 (age 68); Portici, Campania, Italy
- Occupations: Actor, comedian, screenwriter
- Years active: 1976–present
- Known for: Member of comedy trio La Smorfia

Vincenzo "Enzo" Decaro (born 24 March 1958) is an Italian actor, comedian, and screenwriter. He first rose to fame in the late 1970s as a member of the comedy trio La Smorfia, alongside Massimo Troisi and Lello Arena.

== Early life ==
Decaro was born in Portici, a town near Naples. He studied Modern Literature at the University of Naples Federico II. During his studies, he began performing in theatre, eventually forming the trio La Smorfia.

== Career ==
=== La Smorfia ===
In the late 1970s, Decaro co-founded the comedy group La Smorfia with Massimo Troisi and Lello Arena. The trio became popular through stage performances and appearances on Italian television, particularly the RAI variety show Non Stop (1977).

=== Film and television ===
After the dissolution of La Smorfia, Decaro continued working in cinema and television. His film credits include:

- The Pool Hustlers (1982)
- The House of Smiles (1991)
- Ask Me If I'm Happy (2000)

He has also appeared in numerous Italian TV series and dramas, including Un posto al sole and Provaci ancora Prof!.

=== Theatre ===
Decaro has remained active in theatre, performing in both comedic and dramatic roles, often revisiting themes of Neapolitan culture and identity.

== Style and themes ==
Decaro's comedic style is rooted in Neapolitan tradition, blending irony, satire, and everyday observations. His later work often explores family dynamics and social issues in contemporary Italy.

== Personal life ==
Decaro is the father of three children. He continues to live and work in Italy, maintaining strong ties to Naples.
