= Gli onorevoli =

- Directed by: Sergio Corbucci
- Written by: Bruno Corbucci; Vittorio Metz; Giovanni Grimaldi
- Produced by: Gianni Buffardi
- Starring: Totò; Peppino De Filippo; Franca Valeri; Gino Cervi; Aroldo Tieri
- Cinematography: Enzo Barboni
- Edited by: Roberto Cinquini
- Music by: Armando Trovaioli
- Distributed by: Jolly Film
- Release date: 1963
- Running time: 98 minutes
- Country: Italy
- Language: Italian

Gli onorevoli is a 1963 Italian anthology comedy film directed by Sergio Corbucci.

== Simple plot ==
The film is composed of several small stories that have to do with the votes of politicians in Italy in the sixties. A senior sharpshooter decides to run honorable with his program, a mild entrepreneur is tricked with a speech to voters in a television programme, a career woman decides to get into politics, but falling in love with one of his competitors, a communist is deceived in campaign speech by an enemy infiltrator, which is then lynched by the mob once it is detected.

== The performance of Totò ==
The episode with Totò is undoubtedly the most important in the whole movie. He is the famous Antonio La Trippa, posing in her apartment building in Rome a political program restaurator and conservative, given that in his youth he did his military service in the riflemen. Of course in his neighborhood and much more in his city no one understands its reformist intentions, let alone his wife and her friend, treated like a fool servant by the householder. Every morning very early Antonio, as if everyone was in a military barracks, says good morning with a trumpet and then announced with a megaphone to her window propaganda slogans about his political program. Roman citizens, inlcuso the goalkeeper, the tease teasing her last name and the number of its policy list: number 47. In Italy, in fact in the game of bingo (tombola) this number as attached picture the dead man talking. However Antonio does not desist from his efforts, even if slowly begins to write the numbers in some situations. For example, while sleeping he continues to spell: "Vote Antonio! Vote Antonio!" as if he were in front of his constituents. One day, shortly before the election, Antonio is approached by colleagues who are candidates for Deputies of the Italian Parliament in Montecitorio. They offer their objectives to Antonio who, being an honest citizen, he is dazzled. In reality, people are crooks that tried to bring Antonio with the favoritism of contracts, since that bersagliere retired started from a few days to receive so many positive comments from people. Antonio immediately clear deception to the detriment of Italian voters and so designing a countermove, accepting the proposal to join the sinister group of candidates. On the day that Antonio must keep in Rome his speech to the voters, he signs his electoral suicide, since it reveals the voters to be a fraud and, moreover, insults everyone, provoking the ire of the people. It seems that Antonio is crazy, instead he did it just to impeach his shady those colleagues who needed votes. Now that Antonio is discouraged, they too have fallen into the abyss. Towards the final scene of the movie Antonio, dejected and still mocked by all of his roommates always condo and by the goalkeeper, angrily destroys all election posters bearing his face.

== Cast ==
- Totò: Antonio La Trippa
- Gino Cervi: Rossani-Breschi
- Peppino De Filippo: Giuseppe Mollica
- Franca Valeri: Bianca Sereni
- Aroldo Tieri: Saverio Fallopponi
- Franco Fabrizi: Roberto Ciccoletti, aka Robin
- Linda Sini: signora Rossani-Breschi
- Walter Chiari: Salvatore Dagnino
- Riccardo Billi: Giulio
- Memmo Carotenuto: gas station man
- Stelvio Rosi: blond boy
- Anna Campori: signora La Trippa
- Fiorenzo Fiorentini: propagandist
- Carlo Pisacane: oldman of Roccasecca
