= Sergio Corbucci =

Italian film director (1926–1990)

- Born: 6 December 1926; Rome, Kingdom of Italy
- Died: 1 December 1990 (aged 63); Rome, Italy
- Other names: Stanley Corbett; Gordon Wilson Jr. Enzo Corbucci
- Occupation: Film director
- Style: Spaghetti Western; action comedy
- Height: 1.77 m (5 ft 10 in)
- Relatives: Bruno Corbucci (brother); Leonardo Corbucci (nephew)

Sergio Corbucci (Italian: [ˈsɛrdʒo korˈbuttʃi]; 6 December 1926 – 1 December 1990) was an Italian film director, screenwriter and producer. He was one of the main exponents of the Spaghetti Western genre during the 1960s and 1970s, with his most notable works including the original Django, Navajo Joe, The Great Silence, The Mercenary, and Compañeros. He also had a successful career directing comedies.

Corbucci is sometimes referred to as "the other Sergio", referring to fellow Spaghetti Western director Sergio Leone.

== Early life ==
Corbucci was born in Rome in 1926. He had a younger brother Bruno (1931-1996), also a filmmaker. He originally studied economics at university, before working as a film critic. For a period after World War II, he wrote for Stars and Stripes.

== Career ==
=== Early work ===
Corbucci made his directorial debut in 1951 with Salvate mia figlia. His early works were mainly melodramas and crime films. Beginning with 1961's Goliath and the Vampires, he directed sword and sandal movies. He also made several popular comedies, featuring the likes of Totò and Franco and Ciccio.

In 1963, he directed the ensemble war comedy The Shortest Day, which was produced as a benefit film for the studio Titanus. A parody of the Hollywood epic The Longest Day, the film featured an all-star cast of dozens of well-known performers, many of them in brief cameo appearances.

=== Spaghetti Westerns ===
Corbucci's first Westerns were the films Grand Canyon Massacre (1964), which he co-directed (under the pseudonym Stanley Corbett) with Albert Band, as well as Minnesota Clay (1964), his first solo-directed spaghetti Western.

His biggest commercial success was with the cult spaghetti Western Django, starring Franco Nero, the leading man in many of his movies. He would later collaborate with Nero on two other spaghetti Westerns, The Mercenary (1968) — where Nero played Sergei Kowalski, a Polish mercenary and the film also starring Tony Musante, Jack Palance and Giovanna Ralli — as well as Compañeros (1970) — which also starred Tomas Milian and Jack Palance. The last film of the "Mexican Revolution" trilogy - The Mercenary and Compañeros being the first two in the installment - was What Am I Doing in the Middle of the Revolution? (1972).

After Django, Corbucci made many other spaghetti Westerns, which made him the most successful Italian Western director after Sergio Leone and one of Italy's most productive and prolific directors. His most famous of these pictures was The Great Silence (Il Grande Silenzio), a dark and gruesome Western starring a mute action hero and a psychopathic bad guy. The film was banned in some countries for its excessive violence.

Corbucci also directed Navajo Joe (1966), starring Burt Reynolds as the title character, a Navajo Indian opposing a group of bandits that killed his tribe, as well as The Hellbenders (1967), and Johnny Oro (1966) starring Mark Damon. Other spaghetti Westerns he directed include The Specialists (1969), with Johnny Hallyday; Sonny and Jed (1972), with Tomas Milian, Susan George and Telly Savalas; and The White the Yellow and the Black (1975), with Milian and Eli Wallach.

Corbucci's Westerns were dark and brutal, with the characters portrayed as sadistic antiheroes. His films featured very high body counts and scenes of mutilation. Django especially is considered to have set a new level for violence in Westerns.

=== Later career ===
In the 1970s and 1980s, Corbucci mostly directed comedies, often starring Adriano Celentano. Many of these comedies were huge successes at the Italian box office and found wide distribution in European countries like Germany, France, Austria and Switzerland, but were not widely seen in English-speaking territories.

He directed the Terence Hill & Bud Spencer film Who Finds a Friend Finds a Treasure (1981), as well as the solo Terence Hill vehicle Super Fuzz.

His last film was the action-drama Women in Arms (1991), starring Lina Sastri and Donald Pleasence.

== Personal life ==
Corbucci was married twice. His nephew is filmmaker Leonardo Corbucci.

== Death ==
Corbucci died of a heart attack at his home in Rome, five days before his 64th birthday, on December 1, 1990. His remains were buried at a family plot in the Campo Verano.

== Legacy ==
Corbucci's Westerns were rarely taken seriously by contemporary critics and he was considered an exploitation director, but he has managed to attain a cult reputation.

The website Cinema Archives ranked Corbucci as the 199th greatest director of all time.

In 2021, a documentary about Corbucci was released, directed by Luca Rea, Django & Django, that relies to a considerable extent on an interview with Quentin Tarantino.

In 2022, German thrash metal band Kreator released the instrumental song "Sergio Corbucci is Dead" as an intro to their album Hate Über Alles. According to vocalist/guitarist Mille Petrozza, "Sergio Corbucci was someone who was very anti-authoritarian in his film. In all his films, he has a protagonist who rebels against the authorities. Often these characters are very obscure. I was wondering if there are still people like that who make really political films without trying to preach anything to you. It's a bit of a dig at the bands who don't speak their minds out of fear of losing fans."

== Filmography ==
=== Director and writer ===
- Salvate mia figlia (1951)
- Foreign Earth (1954)
- Island Sinner (1954)
- Acque amare (1954)
- Baracca e burattini (1954)
- Carovana di canzoni (1955)
- Suonno d'ammore (1955)
- Supreme Confession (1956)
- Ángeles sin cielo (1957)
- I ragazzi dei Parioli (1959)
- Who Hesitates is Lost (1960)
- An American in Toledo (1960) *Only writer.
- Totò, Peppino e... la dolce vita (1961)
- Goliath and the Vampires (1961)
- Duel of the Titans (1961)
- The Two Marshals (1961)
- The Slave (aka The Son of Spartacus, 1962)
- Lo smemorato di Collegno (1962)
- The Shortest Day (1963)
- The Monk of Monza (1963)
- Gli onorevoli (1963)
- Grand Canyon Massacre (1964) (as Stanley Corbett)
- Minnesota Clay (1964)
- I figli del leopardo (1965)
- The Man Who Laughs (1966)
- Django (1966)
- Ringo and His Golden Pistol (1966)
- Navajo Joe (1966)
- The Hellbenders (aka The Cruel Ones, 1967)
- Death on the Run (1967)
- The Great Silence (1968)
- The Mercenary (aka A Professional Gun, 1968)
- The Specialists (aka Drop Them or I'll Shoot, 1969)
- Compañeros (1970)
- Er più: storia d'amore e di coltello (1971)
- Sonny and Jed (1972)
- What Am I Doing in the Middle of the Revolution? (1972)
- The Beast (1974)
- The White the Yellow and the Black (1975)
- What's Your Sign? (1975)
- The Con Artists (1976)
- Mr. Robinson (1976)
- Three Tigers Against Three Tigers (1977)
- Ecco noi per esempio... (1977)
- The Payoff (1978)
- Odds and Evens (1978)
- Neapolitan Mystery (1979)
- Super Fuzz (1980)
- I Don't Understand You Anymore (1980)
- I'm Getting a Yacht (1980)
- Who Finds a Friend Finds a Treasure (1981)
- My Darling, My Dearest (1982)
- Count Tacchia (1982)
- Sing Sing (1983)
- Questo e Quello (1983)
- A tu per tu (1984)
- I Am an ESP (1985)
- Rimini Rimini (1987)
- Roba da ricchi (1987)
- Days of Inspector Ambrosio (1988)
- Night Club (1989)
- Women in Arms (1991)

=== Actor ===
- Suonno d'ammore (1955) - Bank customer (uncredited)
- Who Hesitates Is Lost (1960) - Billiard player (uncredited)
- Totò, Peppino e... la dolce vita (1961) - Man waiting in the line for the telephone (uncredited)
- Lo smemorato di Collegno (1962) - Man waiting for the Minister (uncredited)
- Gli onorevoli (1963) - Manager of the hotel in Roccasecca (uncredited) (final film role)
