= Private Access =

- Theatrical release poster by Renato Casaro
- Directed by: Francesco Maselli
- Starring: Ornella Muti
- Cinematography: Luigi Kuveiller
- Music by: Giovanna Marini
- Release date: 1988 (Italy)
- Country: Italy
- Language: Italian

Private Access (Italian: Codice privato, also known as Secret Access) is a 1988 Italian drama film directed by Francesco Maselli. For this film Ornella Muti was awarded with a Silver Ribbon for best actress.
