= Heroic Charge =

1952 film

- Directed by: Francesco De Robertis
- Release date: 1952
- Country: Italy
- Language: Italian

Heroic Charge (Italian: Carica eroica) is a 1952 Italian war film directed by Francesco De Robertis. It is based on the battle of Izbushensky.

== Plot ==
Soviet Union. During the Second World War the third Savoy Cavalry arrives in a village that seems deserted, but a patrol on reconnaissance is greeted by a discharge of machine guns. After an initial opposition, the Italian military established a good relationship with the local population.

Suddenly, the order of departure arrives towards the advanced lines, threatened by the enemy. The Germans do not believe that the intervention of the Italian cavalry can be effective against regular troops but the cavalrymen disprove the fears of their allies by giving rise to the last and victorious charge at the turn of the Italian military history, which went down in history as the charge of Isbuscensky.
