= Non stop (TV program) =

Italian television variety show

- Genre: Variety; Sketch Comedy
- Written by: Alberto Testa; Enzo Trapani; Mario Pogliotti; Giancarlo Magalli
- Directed by: Enzo Trapani
- Country of origin: Italy
- No. of seasons: 2
- No. of episodes: 12

Original release
- Network: Rai 1
- Release: 1977 – 1979

Non stop is an Italian television sketch comedy variety show. The show's two seasons were broadcast by Rai 1 from 1977 to 1979.

== History ==
The show is regarded as very innovative for the Italian television of the time, both in its structure and contents; it lacked a proper presenter and consisted of comic monologues alternating with performances of guests. Non stop marked both the breakthrough and, in many cases, the television debut of numerous actors and comedians who would go on to successful careers, notably Carlo Verdone, La Smorfia (Massimo Troisi, Lello Arena and Enzo Decaro), i Giancattivi (Francesco Nuti, Alessandro Benvenuti and Athina Cenci), I Gatti di Vicolo Miracoli (Jerry Calà, Umberto Smaila, Nini Salerno and Franco Oppini), Enrico Beruschi, Marco Messeri, Zuzzurro & Gaspare.

The show has been described as lysergic and visionary, and its structure as "a state of chaos unprecedented in Italian television". TV Sorrisi e Canzoni's Andrea Di Quarto noted that "all the comedy that's been seen on TV since then owes something to it".
