= Lo Zappatore =

- Directed by: Rate Furlan
- Written by: Roberto Amoroso; Libero Bovio
- Distributed by: Variety Distribution
- Release date: 1950
- Country: Italy
- Language: Italian

Lo Zappatore is a 1950 Italian melodrama film directed by Rate Furlan.

== Cast ==
- Clara Auteri Pepe
- Angelo Dessy
- Gabriele Ferzetti
- Vera Furlan
- Clelia Genovese
- Nino Marchesini as Padre Di Carlo
- Marisa Merlini
- Nico Pepe
- Enzo Romagnoli
- Silvio Rossi
- Tecla Scarano
- Valeria Valeri
- Vito Verde
