= Men on the Sea Floor =

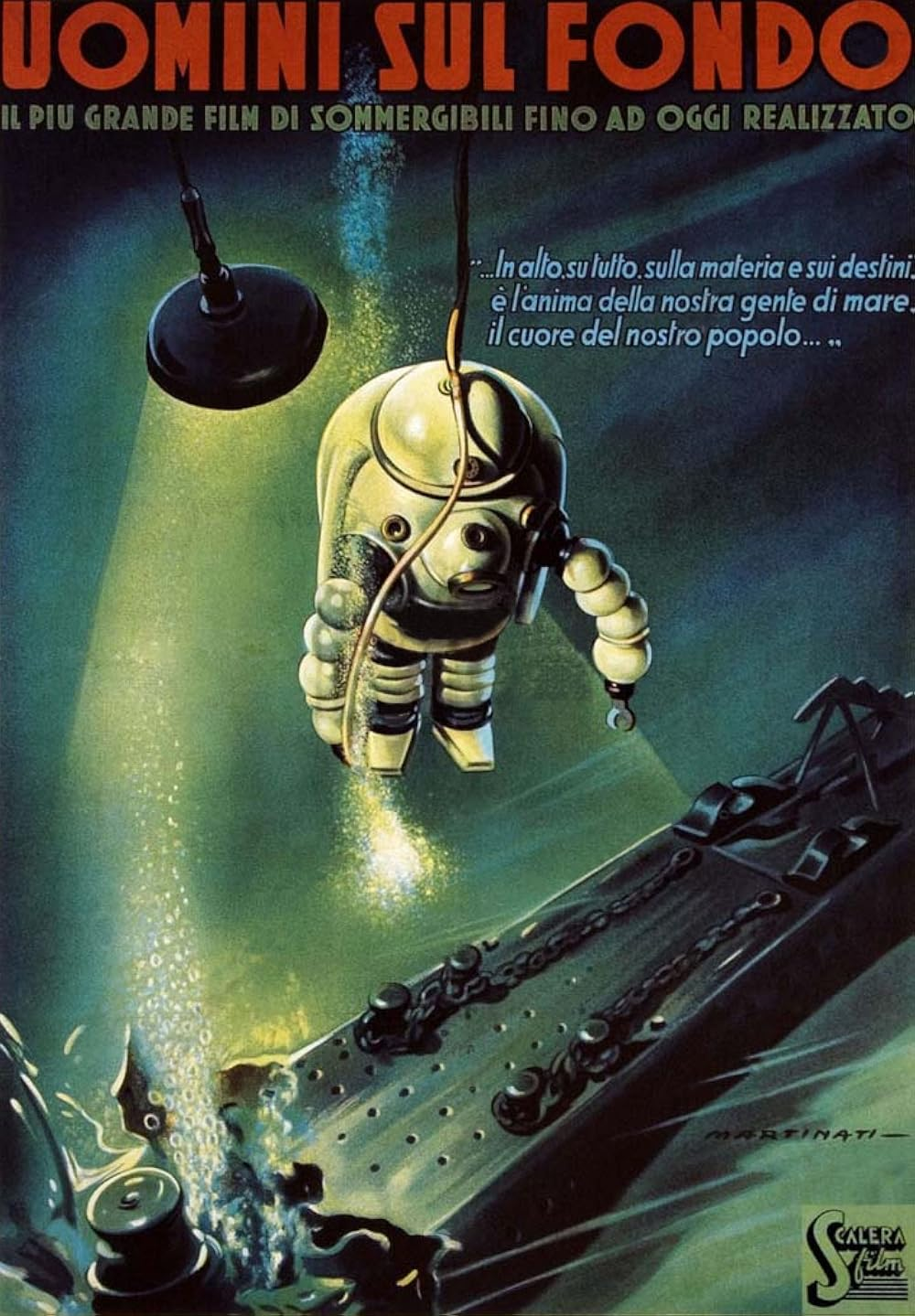
- Directed by: Francesco De Robertis
- Written by: Francesco De Robertis
- Cinematography: Giuseppe Caracciolo
- Edited by: Francesco De Robertis
- Music by: Edgardo Carducci
- Production company: Scalera Film
- Distributed by: Scalera Film; Screen Guild Productions (US)
- Release date: 13 February 1941 (Italy)
- Running time: 99 minutes
- Country: Italy
- Language: Italian

Men on the Sea Floor (Italian: Uomini sul fondo), also known as SOS Submarine, is a 1941 Italian drama film directed by Francesco De Robertis. De Robertis specialised in semi-documentary films, in this case portraying the crew of an Italian submarine trapped after an accident. De Robertis's technique of using non-actors in roles has been credited as an influence on the development of Italian neorealism.

== Background ==
In 1940, the Centro Cinematografico del Ministero della Marina (Film Center of the Naval Ministry) commissioned De Robertis to make a film featuring 'the officers, petty officers, and crew of one of our large-scale submarines'. The result was Men on the Sea Floor, the first in a series of four propaganda films about the war in the Mediterranean, alongside The White Ship, directed by Roberto Rossellini, and Alfa Tau!, also directed by De Robertis.

Men on the Sea Floor was the second film produced by the Italian film production and distribution company Scalera Film. The film is dedicated "to the memory of the crews who will never return from the depths of the sea, who died so that it may be ours." Released in 1941, it is considered one of the last examples of fascist propaganda films. The film's assistant director was Roberto Rossellini, who often collaborated with De Robertis in the early 1940s. Among the young filmmakers who worked with De Robertis on Men on the Sea Floor was Mario Bava, who went on to direct the photography for many of De Robertis' short films. Bava, who began his career as a special effects creator and cinematographer, considered De Robertis a mentor.

== Plot ==
During training manoeuvres, submarine A103 collides with the steamship Ariel, which had been forced to change course to avoid a fog bank. The collision leaves a gash in the submarine's side, causing it to sink. Attempts to refloat the submarine fail because it is stuck on the seabed.

Some men manage to surface and report their exact position. The rescue ships Titano and Ciclope, the Anteo lifting pontoon and two seaplanes then arrive. Several hours later, most of the crew is rescued. The military command prepares a plan to pump air into the flooded section of the submarine, releasing the water that is weighing it down in an attempt to refloat it. Despite the atmospheric pressure and carbon dioxide levels reaching almost unbearable levels, the captain and seven sailors decide to stay aboard in an attempt to save the vessel.

Although the divers manage to seal the hole, they are unable to open the valve to pump air inside. They could try to open it from the inside, but the pumping station is completely filled with chlorine, which makes the task almost impossible. Sailor Leandri decides to try alone. He succeeds in opening the valve and letting in air, but his hand gets stuck under the lever and he dies from fume poisoning. However, his sacrifice allows the submarine to refloat and set sail.

Once the submarine has surfaced, it is greeted with a festive salute. However, silence immediately falls when the flag is raised at half-mast in honour of sailor Leandri's spontaneous act of heroism.

== Partial cast ==
- Felga Lauri
- Diego Pozzetto
- Marichetta Stoppa

== Release ==
The film was released in the US in 1948 with dubbed English.

== Bibliography ==
- Moliterno, Gino (2009). The A to Z of Italian Cinema. Lanham, Maryland: Scarecrow Press. ISBN 978-0810870598.
- Gundle, Stephen (2013). Mussolini's Dream Factory: Film Stardom in Fascist Italy. New York-Oxford: Berghahn Books. ISBN 978-1782382447.
