= Angelo Dessy =

Italian actor (1907–1983)

- Born: 10 July 1907; Alghero, Italy
- Died: 17 January 1983 (aged 75); Rome, Italy
- Occupation: Actor
- Years active: 1940-1974

Angelo Dessy (10 July 1907 - 17 January 1983) was an Italian actor. He appeared in more than fifty films from 1940 to 1974.

== Filmography ==
Year	Title	Role	Notes
1940	The Sinner		
1941	Beatrice Cenci		
1942	Don Cesare di Bazan		
1942	Jealousy		
1942	Sleeping Beauty		
1943	The White Angel		
1950	Pact with the Devil		
1950	Lo Zappatore		
1950	Against the Law		
1951	Tragic Spell		
1951	Malavita		
1952	Sardinian Vendetta		
1954	Touchez pas au grisbi		
1956	The Wanderers		
1965	I criminali della metropoli		
1966	Kill Johnny Ringo	Jackson	
1969	The Reward's Yours... The Man's Mine		
1970	Shango		
