= Lamberto Maggiorani =

Italian actor

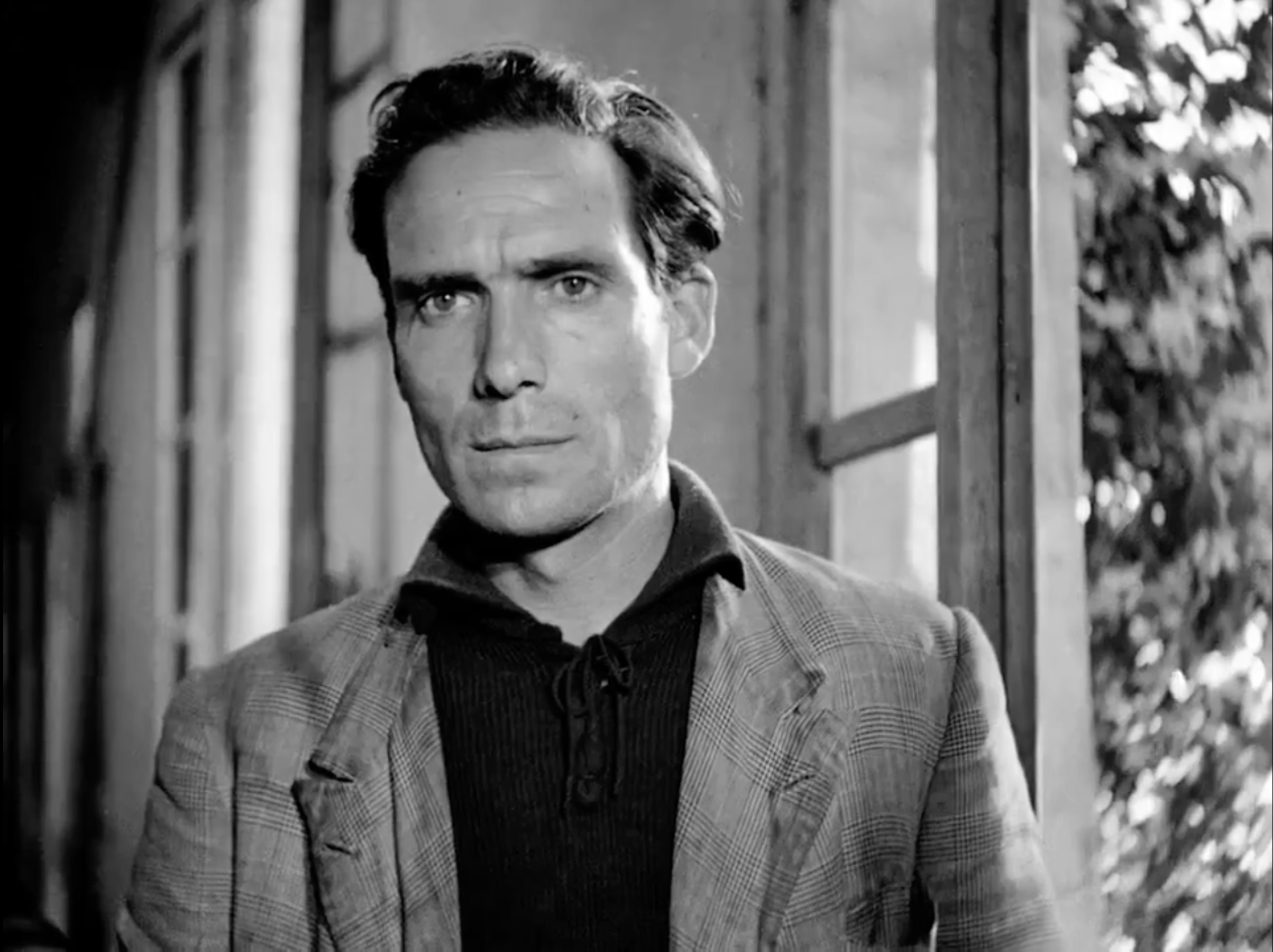
- Maggiorani in Bicycle Thieves (1948)
- Born: 28 August 1909; Rome, Italy
- Died: 22 April 1983 (aged 73); Rome, Italy
- Years active: 1948–1970

Lamberto Maggiorani (28 August 1909 – 22 April 1983) was an Italian actor remembered for his portrayal of Antonio Ricci in the 1948 Vittorio De Sica film Bicycle Thieves.

He was a factory worker (he worked as a turner) and a non-professional actor at the time he was cast in this film. He earned 600,000 lire ($1,000 US) for his performance, enabling him to buy new furniture and treat his family to a vacation; but when he returned to the factory he was laid off because business was slackening and management felt it would be fairer to terminate him instead of other impoverished co-workers since he was perceived to have "made millions" as a movie star. He found occasional work as a bricklayer, but continued to try to get roles in movies, with little success; even de Sica was reluctant to employ him as anything other than an extra. Pier Paolo Pasolini gave him a bit part in the film Mamma Roma (1962) due to his iconic status in Italian cinema. Cesare Zavattini, the screenwriter for Bicycle Thieves, aware of Maggiorani's predicament, wrote a screenplay about him titled "Tu, Maggiorani", in an attempt to demonstrate the limits of neorealist film's capacity to change the world.

Maggiorani died in Rome in 1983 at the San Giovanni hospital without ever regaining his first success as a film actor.

== Filmography ==
Year	Title	Role	Notes
1948	Bicycle Thieves	Antonio	
1949	Twenty Years		
1950	Women Without Names	Anna's Fiancé	
1951	A Tale of Five Cities		
1951	Attention! Bandits!	Marco	
1951	Anna	Il malato ferito allo stomaco	
1951	Salvate mia figlia		
1952	Umberto D.		Uncredited
1954	Via Padova 46	The Porter in Via Padova	
1954	Vacation with a Gangster	Il galeotto innocente N. 5823	
1955	Don Camillo's Last Round		
1956	Toto, Peppino and the Outlaws	Un bandito	
1961	The Last Judgment	Poor man	
1962	Mamma Roma	Un malato (Sick man)	
1963	Mad Sea	L'uomo che paga l'ingaggio	
1970	Ostia	Padre di Monica	(final film role)
