= Civico zero =

- Poster
- Directed by: Francesco Maselli
- Written by: Francesco Maselli
- Produced by: Roberto Andreucci
- Starring: Ornella Muti
- Cinematography: Felice De Maria
- Edited by: Olivia Orlando
- Music by: Angelo Talocci
- Release date: 2007
- Country: Italy
- Language: Italian

Civico zero (Italian: Civico 0) is a 2007 Italian drama film written and directed by Francesco Maselli. It is inspired by the book Il nome del barbon of Federico Bonadonna.

== Plot ==
The film consists of three episodes, each one starring a professional actor. They are, respectively, Letizia Sedrick (episode I), Ornella Muti (episode II) and Massimo Ranieri (episode III).

Episode I: Stella (Letizia Sedrick) is a young Ethiopian who arrived in Rome. She lives in a container, finds a job at via Marsala and marries with Joseph, an old African friend. The life of the couple is hard, being constrained to move from town to town to find jobs.

Episode II: Nina (Ornella Muti) is Romanian and lives in Rome without a residence permit. She fights against social loneliness and seeks a job, though the main obstacle is the lack of knowledge of the Italian language. thanks to the help of another Romanian lady she finds a job as domestic worker for two ladies aged 92 and 62, and living completely alone in Rome.

Episode III: Giuliano (Massimo Ranieri) is a fruit seller at Campo de' Fiori in Rome. After his mother's death he became mad, and is walking through the city without any aim.

== Cast ==
- Ornella Muti as Nina, Romanian migrant
- Massimo Ranieri as Giuliano
- Letizia Sedrick as Stella, Ethiopian migrant
