= How I Learned to Love Women =

1966 film

- Theatrical release poster
- Directed by: Luciano Salce
- Produced by: Enrico Chroscicki; Alfonso Sansone
- Starring: Robert Hoffmann; Elsa Martinelli; Anita Ekberg; Michèle Mercier; Sandra Milo; Nadja Tiller
- Cinematography: Erico Menczer
- Music by: Ennio Morricone
- Release date: 2 October 1966 (Italy)

How I Learned to Love Women (Italian: Come imparai ad amare le donne, French: Comment j'ai appris à aimer les femmes, German: Das gewisse Etwas der Frauen, also known as Love Parade) is a 1966 Italian-French-German comedy film directed by Luciano Salce.

== Cast ==
- Michèle Mercier as Franziska
- Nadja Tiller as Baroness Laura
- Elsa Martinelli as Rallye driver
- Anita Ekberg as Margaret Joyce
- Robert Hoffmann as Robert
- Zarah Leander as Olga
- Sandra Milo as Ilde
- Romina Power as Irene
- Orchidea De Santis as Agnes
- Vittorio Caprioli as Playboy
- Sonja Romanoff as Monika
- Erica Schramm as Betty
- Gigi Ballista as Sir Archibald
- Heinz Erhardt as Schluessel
- Chantal Cachin as Wilma
- Gianrico Tedeschi as Director
- Mita Medici
- Carlo Croccolo
- Mariangela Giordano
