= The Suspect (1975 film) =

- Directed by: Francesco Maselli
- Written by: Francesco Maselli; Franco Solinas
- Cinematography: Giulio Albonico
- Music by: Giovanna Marini
- Release date: February 21, 1975
- Country: Italy
- Language: Italian

The Suspect (Italian: Il sospetto) is a 1975 Italian political thriller and drama film directed by Francesco Maselli.

The film is set in Fascist Italy, where the members of the Italian Communist Party (1921-1991) are facing persecution. A party member is sent to Turin on a clandestine mission.

== Plot ==
Fascism has forced the leadership of the Italian Communist Party to settle in Paris. In Italy arrests of militants are decimating the organization, so Emilio is sent on a mission in the area of Turin, to put out of harm whistleblowers.

== Cast ==
- Gian Maria Volonté: Emilio
- Annie Girardot: Teresa
- Renato Salvatori: Gavino Pintus
- Gabriele Lavia: Giacomo La Rosa
- Bruno Corazzari: Tommaso Lenzini
- Felice Andreasi: Alessandri
- Antonio Casale: Resta
- Pietro Biondi: OVRA Agent
- Franco Balducci: Funzionario
