= The Eternal Chain =

1952 film

- Spanish film poster
- Directed by: Anton Giulio Majano
- Written by: Mario Brancacci; Anton Giulio Majano
- Produced by: Alberto Megale
- Starring: Marcello Mastroianni
- Cinematography: Bitto Albertini
- Edited by: Otello Colangeli
- Music by: Tarcisio Fusco
- Distributed by: Megale Film
- Release date: 2 May 1952
- Running time: 98 minutes
- Country: Italy
- Language: Italian

The Eternal Chain (Italian: L'eterna catena) is a 1952 Italian melodrama film directed by Anton Giulio Majano.

== Plot ==
A naval officer becomes the lover of his brother's girlfriend. The latter kills a suitor of the girl; of the murder, however, the other is accused, who is forced to flee. Returning years after joining the Foreign Legion, he discovers that a son was born from the relationship; the brother opposes their union and accidentally dies, but before him he confesses his crime.

== Cast ==
- Marcello Mastroianni as Walter Ronchi
- Gianna Maria Canale as Maria Raneri
- Marco Vicario as Sandro Ronchi
- Leda Gloria as Donna Teresa, madre di Maria
- Umberto Spadaro as Maresciallo della legione straniera
- Carlo Croccolo as Peppino
- Aldo Nicodemi as Filippo Lanza
- Olinto Cristina as Maestro Vallini
- Nietta Zocchi as The 'Alhambra' Owner
- Gisella Monaldi as Donna Carmela
- Duccio Sissia as Walter - Maria's son
- Corrado Mantoni as himself (as Corrado)
- Mario Galli
- Liana Billi
- Giulio Battiferri
