= Giuseppe Caracciolo =

Italian cinematographer (born 1892)

- Born: April 17, 1892; Naples, Campania, Kingdom of Italy
- Occupation: Cinematographer
- Years active: 1918–1971 (film)

Giuseppe Caracciolo was an Italian cinematographer, who worked on more than forty films during his career which stretched from the silent era into the Post-War years. In 1944, he was employed on Vittorio De Sica's The Children Are Watching Us.

== Selected filmography ==
- Sun (1929)
- The White Ship (1941)
- Men on the Sea Floor (1941)
- Giarabub (1942)
- The Children Are Watching Us (1944)
- The Tyrant of Padua (1946)
- The Emperor of Capri (1949)
- Toto Looks for a House (1949)
- Red Seal (1950)
- Malavita (1951)
- Red Moon (1951)

== Bibliography ==
- Cardullo, Bert. In Search of Cinema: Writings on International Film Art. McGill-Queen's Press, 2004.
