= Mita Medici =

Italian actress (born 1950)

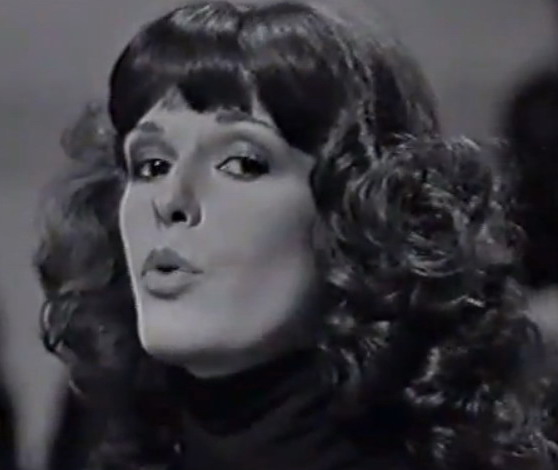
- Born: Patrizia Vistarini; 20 August 1950 (age 75); Rome, Italy
- Other name: Patrizia Perini
- Occupations: Actress; singer
- Father: Francesco Vistarini
- Relatives: Carla Vistarini (sister)

Patrizia Vistarini (born 20 August 1950), known professionally as Mita Medici and sometimes credited as Patrizia Perini, is an Italian actress and singer.

== Biography ==
Born in Rome as Patrizia Vistarini, daughter of the actor Franco Silva, she was launched in 1965 by winning the "Miss Teenager" pageant. Medici made her film debut in 1966, at 16, in Luciano Salce's How I Learned to Love Women. She is also active in television, in which she hosted shows such as Canzonissima and Sereno variabile and appeared in several TV-series. She was also a singer, active between late 60's and early 80's, and her main success was the song "A ruota libera", which in 1973 ranked 10 in the Italian Hit Parade.

In 1968, she was the subject of the song "Mita, Mita, Mita" by progressive rock group Le Orme.

Her elder sister Carla Vistarini is a song lyricist, novelist, playwright and scriptwriter. She's an atheist.

== Discography ==
=== Studio albums ===
- …A ruota libera (1973)
- Per una volta (1975)

=== Singles ===
- "Questo amore finito così" (1969)
- "Un posto per me/Avventura che nasce" (1970)
- "Un amore/Una storia come tante" (1971)
- "Quei giorni/Se ci sta lui" (1972)
- "Ruota libera/Cosa vuoi che ti dica" (1973)
- "Proprio così/Tremendo" (1973)
- "Scappa scappa/Quei giorni" (1973)
- "Chi sono/Nave" (1975)
- "Uomo/Trucco" (1977)
- "Paletta paletta/Mago tango" (1981)
- "Ma che fiesta" feat. Gianni Dei (1989)

== Filmography ==
=== Films ===
Year	Title	Role(s)	Notes
1966	How I Learned to Love Women	Annamaria	
1966	L'estate	Elisabetta Fantoni	
1967	Don't Sting the Mosquito	Vanessa	
1967	Pronto... c'è una certa Giuliana per te	Giuliana	
1968	Colpo di sole	Cristina Mancinelli	
1969	Plagio	Angela	
1970	Come ti chiami, amore mio?	Carola	
1980	Ombre	Patrizia	
1992	Gole ruggenti	Paolo's wife	
1993	Cinecittà... Cinecittà	Herself	Cameo appearance
1997	L'amico di Wang	Nurse Ambra	
2003	Amorfù	Rock poetess	Cameo appearance
2005	E se domani	Director Morandi	
2009	Feisbum	Doriana	
2011	Un milione di giorni	Maria	

=== Television ===
Year	Title	Role(s)	Notes
1970	Coralba	Deborah Danon	Main role (5 episodes)
1974	The White Horse Inn	Ottilie Pesamenole	Television film
1979	The Master of Ballantrae	Alison Graeme	Television film
1985	Murder of a Moderate Man	Regina	Recurring role (3 episodes)
1985, 1987	Aeroporto internazionale	Secretary	2 episodes
1989	Don Tonino	Journalist	Episode: "Il mistero di Villa Gruber"
1992	Il cielo non cade mai	Clara Negroni	Television film
1997–2003, 2013	Un posto al sole	Marisa Saviani	Recurring role (77 episodes)
2001	CentoVetrine	Paola Novelli	Recurring role (5 episodes)
2006–2008	Un ciclone in famiglia	Barbara	Main role (14 episodes)
2008	Provaci ancora prof!	Martina Maselli	Episode: "La prof della prof"
2008	Don Matteo	Silveria	Episode: "I segreti degli altri"
