= Enzo Trapani =

Italian screenwriter, set designer, and director

- Born: 28 August 1922; Rome, Lazio, Italy
- Died: 14 November 1989 (aged 67); Rome, Lazio, Italy
- Occupations: Director, Writer
- Years active: 1948–1989

Plaque dedicated to Enzo Trapani in Castiglioncello

Enzo Trapani (1922–1989) was an Italian screenwriter, set designer, TV show producer/director and film director.

== Selected filmography ==
- Turri il bandito (1950)
- Destiny (1951)
- Brief Rapture (1951)
- Viva il cinema! (1952)
- Highest Pressure (1965)

== TV shows ==
- Abito da sera (1960)
- Gente che va, gente che viene (1960) - serial
- Piccolo concerto (961)
- Cabina di regia (1962)
- Il signore delle ventuno (1962)
- Alta pressione (1962)
- Smash (1963)
- Senza rete (1968-1969-1970-1971-1972)
- Campioni a Campione (1969)
- Sicilia happening (1970)
- Hai visto mai? (1973)
- Angeli e cornacchie (1975)
- La compagnia stabile della canzone con varieté e comica finale (1975)
- Su e giù per le Dolomiti (1976)
- Rete tre (1976)
- Il guazzabuglio (1977)
- Scuola serale per aspiranti italiani (1977)
- Non stop (1977 - 1978)
- Stryx (1978)
- Fantastico (1979-1980-1982-1983)
- Superclassifica show (1978 - 1981)
- C'era due volte (1980)
- Te la do io l'America (1981)
- Hello Goggi (1981)
- Dueditutto (1982)
- Te lo do io il Brasile (1984)
- Tastomatto (1985)
- Proffimamente non stop (1987)
- Io Jane, tu Tarzan (1988)

== Bibliography ==
- Piero Pruzzo & Enrico Lancia. Amedeo Nazzari. Gremese Editore, 1983.
