= Un Animale utile =

- Release date: 1951
- Country: Italy
- Language: Italian

Un Animale utile is a 1951 Italian film written by Attilio Bertolucci and Giulio Bollati, and directed by Antonio Marchi.
