= Ermanno Randi =

Italian actor (1920–1951)

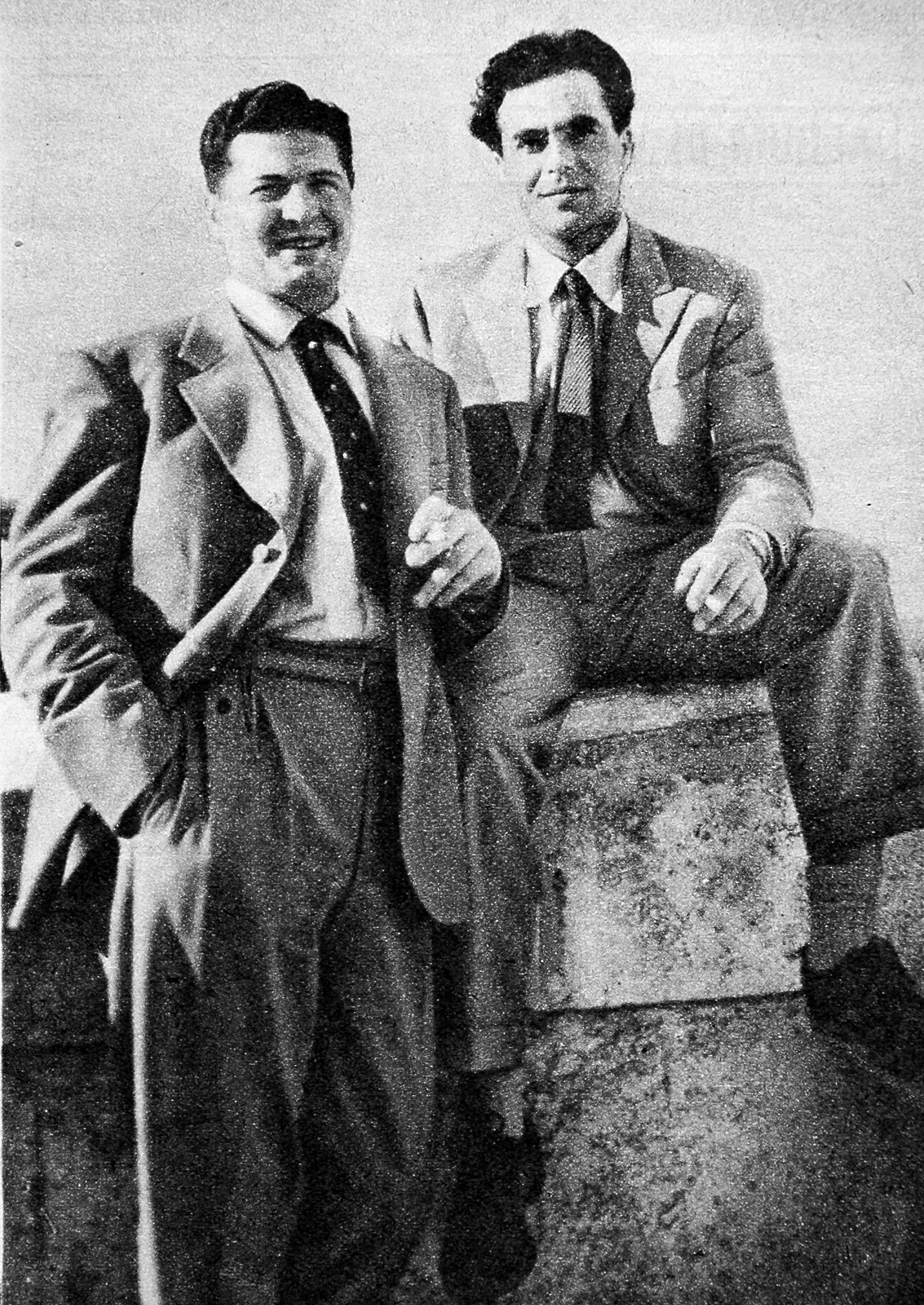
- Ermanno Randi (right), with Giuseppe Maggiore
- Born: 27 April 1920; Arezzo, Tuscany; Italy
- Died: 1 November 1951 (aged 31); Rome, Lazio; Italy
- Other name: Ermanno Rossi
- Occupation: Actor
- Years active: 1947–1951 (film)

Ermanno Randi (27 April 1920 – 1 November 1951) was an Italian film actor. After serving in the Italian Army during the Second World War, Randi made his screen debut in 1947. He gradually moved up from playing supporting to lead roles. In 1951 he played the tenor Enrico Caruso in The Young Caruso. The same year he was fatally shot by his lover, Giuseppe Maggiore, during a row. Randi was 31.

== Filmography ==
Year	Title	Role	Notes
1947	Tragic Hunt	Andrea	
1948	L'ebreo errante		
1948	Anni difficili	Turi	
1949	Bitter Rice	Paolo	
1949	The Walls of Malapaga	Un agent de police / Un'agente di polizia	Uncredited
1949	Sicilian Uprising	Ruggero	
1949	Le due madonne	Giacomo	
1950	Turri il bandito	Turri	
1950	I fuorilegge	bandito Cosimo	
1950	Il sentiero dell'odio		
1950	Il nido di Falasco	Damiano	
1951	Brief Rapture	Stefano Ferrari	
1951	The Young Caruso	Enrico Caruso	
1951	Fiamme sulla laguna	Figlio di Antonio	
1951	Trieste mia!	Alberto	
1951	Santa Lucia Luntana		
1951	Salvate mia figlia	Andrea	
1951	The Cliff of Sin		
1952	A Mother Returns	Giornalista	(final film role)
