= Fiorenzo, il terzo uomo =

- Directed by: Stefano Canzio
- Starring: Aldo Fabrizi; Renato Rascel; Nino Taranto
- Release date: 1951
- Country: Italy
- Language: Italian

Fiorenzo, il terzo uomo is a 1951 Italian comedy film directed by Stefano Canzio.

== Cast ==
- Aldo Fabrizi
- Renato Rascel
- Nino Taranto
- Mario Siletti
- Silvio Gigli
- Raffaele Pisu
