= Franco Silva =

Italian actor

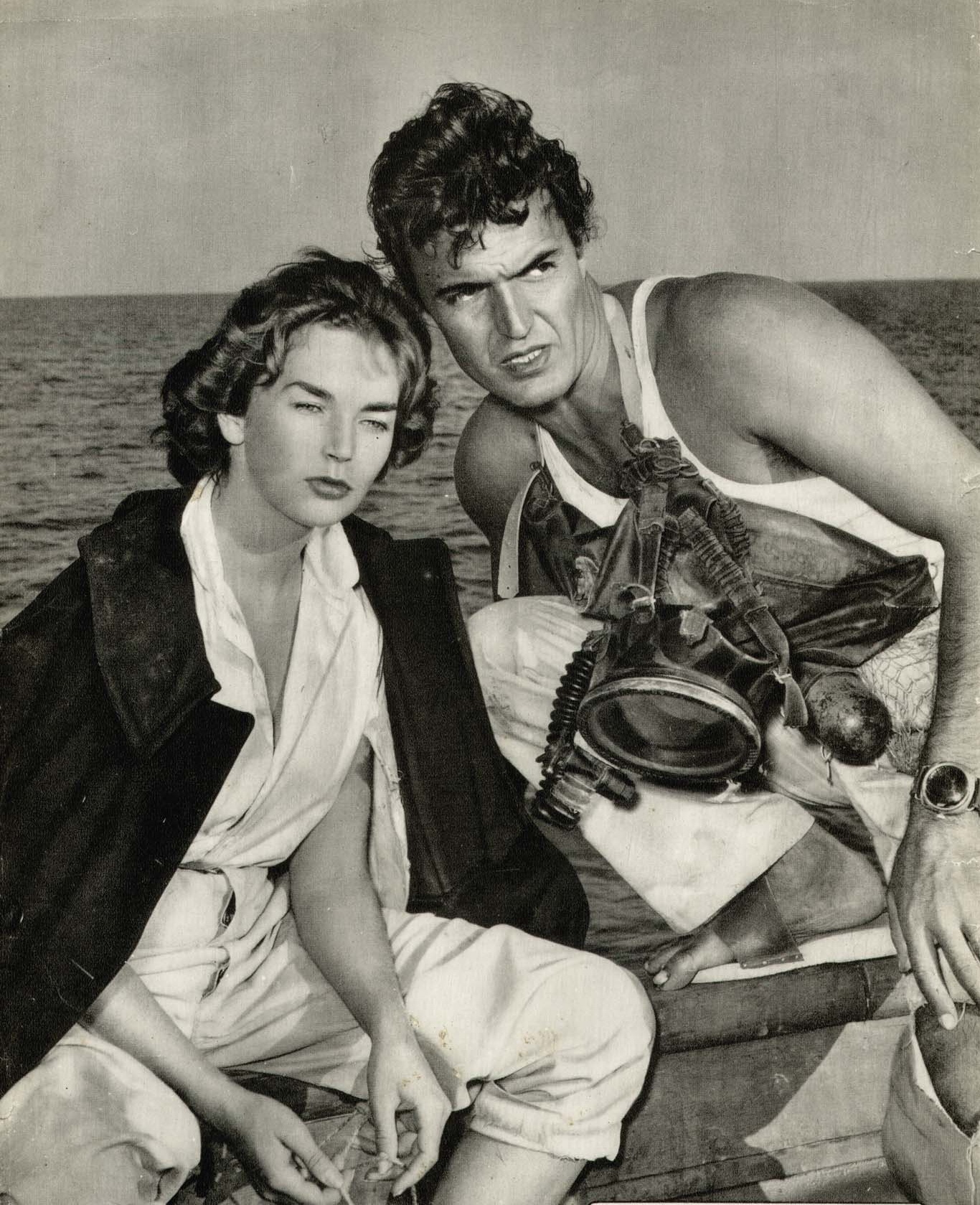
- Dawn Addams and Franco Silva in the film Mizar (1954)
- Born: Francesco Vistarini; 18 February 1920; Genoa, Kingdom of Italy
- Died: 10 November 1995 (aged 75); Livorno, Italy
- Occupation: Actor
- Children: Carla Vistarini; Patrizia Vistarini

Francesco Vistarini (18 February 1920 – 10 November 1995), known professionally as Franco Silva, was an Italian actor.

Born in Genoa, Silva moved in Rome to attend the Centro Sperimentale di Cinematografia, from which he graduated in 1938; the following year he made his film debut in Ho visto brillare le stelle. Silva was mainly active between the 1950s and the mid-1960s; he was also active on stage and on television. Silva was the father of scriptwriter and novelist Carla Vistarini and actress Mita Medici.

== Partial filmography ==
- Ho visto brillare le stelle (1939) - Mario
- Vietato ai minorenni (1944) - Lo studento in medicina
- The Lion of Amalfi (1950)
- Malavita (1951) - Serg. Mario
- The Wonderful Adventures of Guerrin Meschino (1952) - Bayazil
- Femmina senza cuore (1952) - Carlo
- The Queen of Sheba (1952) - Kabaal, commander of the Sheban army
- The Man from Cairo (1953) - Armeno
- Frine, Courtesan of Orient (1953) - Claus
- Mizar (Frogwoman) (1954) - comandante Luigi Ferri
- The Last Race (1954)
- The Count of Bragelonne (1954) - Boissière
- Processo all'amore (1955) - Enrico Mariani
- Canzone proibita (1956) - Paolo
- Allow Me, Daddy! (1956) - Gigi Biagi - Cognato di Rodolfo
- Occhi senza luce (1956) - Sandro
- Il canto dell'emigrante (1956) - Franco Lari
- Donne, amore e matrimoni (1956) - Corrado
- Il ricatto di un padre (1957) - Serpieri
- Song of Naples (1957) - Max Rambarzi
- Adorabili e bugiarde (1958) - Police Commissioner
- Hannibal (1959) - Maharbal
- Guardatele ma non toccatele (1959) - Morris Blond
- The Mongols (1961) - Stepen of Crakow
- The Count of Monte Cristo (1961) - Mario
- L'urlo dei bolidi (1961)
- Charge of the Black Lancers (1962) - Gamul
- The Tough and the Mighty (1969) - Arecu
- Questa libertà di avere... le ali bagnate (1971) - Robin
- The Assassination of Matteotti (1973)
- Spasmo (1974) - Luca
- Patrick Still Lives (1980) - Lyndon Kraft (final film role)
