= Matrimonio alla moda =

- Directed by: Luciano Emmer
- Release date: 1951
- Country: Italy
- Language: Italian

Matrimonio alla moda is a 1951 Italian documentary short film.

The director and writer was Luciano Emmer.
