= Salvate mia figlia =

- Directed by: Sergio Corbucci
- Release date: 1951
- Country: Italy
- Language: Italian

Salvate mia figlia (Save My Daughter) is a 1951 Italian melodrama film.

== Cast ==
- Bianca Doria
- Juan de Landa
- Vittorio Duse
- Fosca Freda - Carla
- Mary Jokam
- Franca Marzi - Ex amante di Andrea
- Bianca Manenti
- Lamberto Maggiorani
- Andreina Mazzotto - Mariuccia
- Sandro Ruffini - Chirurgo
- Ermanno Randi - Andrea
