= Sport minore =

- Directed by: Francesco Maselli
- Produced by: Giorgio Patara
- Narrated by: Gerardo Guerrieri
- Cinematography: Ubaldo Marelli
- Music by: Giovanni Fusco
- Production company: Cittadella Film
- Release date: 1951 (Italy)
- Running time: 11 minutes
- Country: Italy

Sport minore is a 1951 Italian short documentary film directed by Francesco Maselli.

== Legacy ==
Sport minore was screened at the 2015 Il Cinema Ritrovato festival, Bologna.
