= I Castelli dell'Emilia =

1951 film

- Release date: 1951
- Country: Italy
- Language: Italian

I Castelli dell'Emilia is a 1951 Italian documentary film.
