= Sangue al sole =

- Release date: 1951
- Country: Italy
- Language: Italian

Sangue al sole is a 1951 Italian film.
