= The Mysteries of Venice =

1951 film

- Directed by: Ignazio Ferronetti
- Written by: Max Calandri; Ignazio Ferronetti; Giuseppe Aldo Rossi
- Produced by: Mario Branca
- Starring: Virginia Belmont; Renato Valente; Tito Schipa
- Cinematography: Bruno Barcarol
- Edited by: Ignazio Ferronetti
- Music by: Bruno Maderna
- Production company: Industrialfilm
- Release date: 19 May 1951
- Country: Italy
- Language: Italian

The Mysteries of Venice (Italian: I Misteri di Venezia) is a 1951 Italian drama film directed by Ignazio Ferronetti and starring Virginia Belmont, Renato Valente and Tito Schipa. The film's sets were designed by the art director Luigi Scaccianoce.

== Cast ==
- Virginia Belmont as Gloria
- Renato Valente as Valerio
- Tito Schipa as Gennarino
- Diana Schipa
- Liliana Agrosi
- Gino Rumor
- Lino Boccaccini
- Emilio Zago
- Mario Sailer
- Federico Ninchi

== Bibliography ==
- Chiti, Roberto & Poppi, Roberto. Dizionario del cinema italiano: Dal 1945 al 1959. Gremese Editore, 1991.
- Whittaker, Tom & Wright, Sarah. Locating the Voice in Film: Critical Approaches and Global Practices. Oxford University Press, 2017.
