= The Young Caruso =

- Directed by: Giacomo Gentilomo
- Produced by: Maleno Malenotti
- Starring: Ermanno Randi and Gina Lollobrigida
- Cinematography: Tino Santoni
- Edited by: Elsa Dubbini
- Music by: Carlo Franci
- Production companies: Asso Film; Londo Films; Tirenna Film Associata di Roma
- Release date: 24 October 1951
- Running time: 78 minutes
- Country: Italy
- Language: Italian

The Young Caruso is a 1951 Italian historical musical melodrama biographical film about Enrico Caruso, directed by Giacomo Gentilomo. It stars Ermanno Randi as Enrico Caruso and Gina Lollobrigida. Its original Italian title is Enrico Caruso: leggenda di una voce (Enrico Caruso: Legend of a Voice).

It was produced by Asso Film, Londo Films and Tirenna Film Associata di Roma. It was adapted from a 1942 novel by Frank Thiess, Neapolitanische Legende (Neapolitan Legend). The film follows the life of the legendary tenor from childhood poverty in Naples to the beginning of his rise to fame. Caruso's voice was provided by Mario Del Monaco and Lollobrigida's voice was dubbed by Dhia Cristiani.

== Cast ==
- Ermanno Randi as Enrico Caruso
- Gina Lollobrigida as Stella
- Ciro Scafa as Luigi Gregorio Proboseide
- Carlo Sposito as Giovanni "Gianni" Palma
- Maurizio Di Nardo as Caruso as a boy
- Gaetano Verna as Caruso's father
- Mária Tasnádi Fekete as Anna (Caruso's mother)
- Lamberto Picasso as Vergine the Maestro
- Nerio Bernardi as Francesco Zucchi
- Gianpaolo Rosmino as Goffredo
- Romano Laurienzo as Gino Saltamerenda
- Elena Sangro as Signora Tivaldi
- Franca Tamantini as Carragi, a soprano
- Mimi Ferrari

== Reception ==
Although an initial commercial success, the film producers knew that the film was almost total fiction; indeed, an introductory title describes the plot as "a poetic interpretation of [Caruso's] youth." The film has thus been called a "travesty" because it had so many biographical inaccuracies. The film greatly upset the Caruso family who ended up suing the producers of the film for five million lire. The family also successfully sued Metro-Goldwyn-Mayer who was forced to withdraw The Great Caruso from distribution in Italy because of that film's many inaccuracies.

Shortly after the film's release Ermanno Randi was murdered by his lover Giuseppe Maggiore in a jealous rage.
