= Il Cammino di una grande amica =

- Directed by: Lino Lionello Ghirardini
- Release date: 1951
- Country: Italy
- Language: Italian

Il Cammino di una grande amica is a 1951 Italian documentary film directed by Lino Lionello Ghirardini.
