= Quelli che soffrono per voi =

- Directed by: Alessandro Blasetti
- Release date: 1951
- Country: Italy
- Language: Italian

Quelli che soffrono per voi is a 1951 Italian short documentary film directed by Alessandro Blasetti.
