= Francesco De Robertis =

Italian screenwriter, film editor and director

- Born: 16 October 1902; San Marco in Lamis, Apulia, Kingdom of Italy
- Died: 3 February 1959 (aged 56); Rome, Lazio, Italy
- Occupations: Director, Screenwriter
- Years active: 1940-1957 (film)

Francesco De Robertis (16 October 1902 – 3 February 1959) was an Italian screenwriter, film editor, and director. His early-1940s semi-documentary filmmaking style is credited with influencing the development of Italian neorealism.

== Selected filmography ==
=== Director ===
- Men on the Sea Floor (1941)
- The Lovers of Ravello (1951)
- Heroic Charge (1952)
- Uomini ombra (1954)
- Mizar (Sabotaggio in mare) (1954)

=== Screenwriter ===
- The White Ship (1941)

== Bibliography ==
- Bondanella, Peter. A History of Italian Cinema. Continuum, 2009.
