= Uomini ombra =

1954 film by Francesco De Robertis

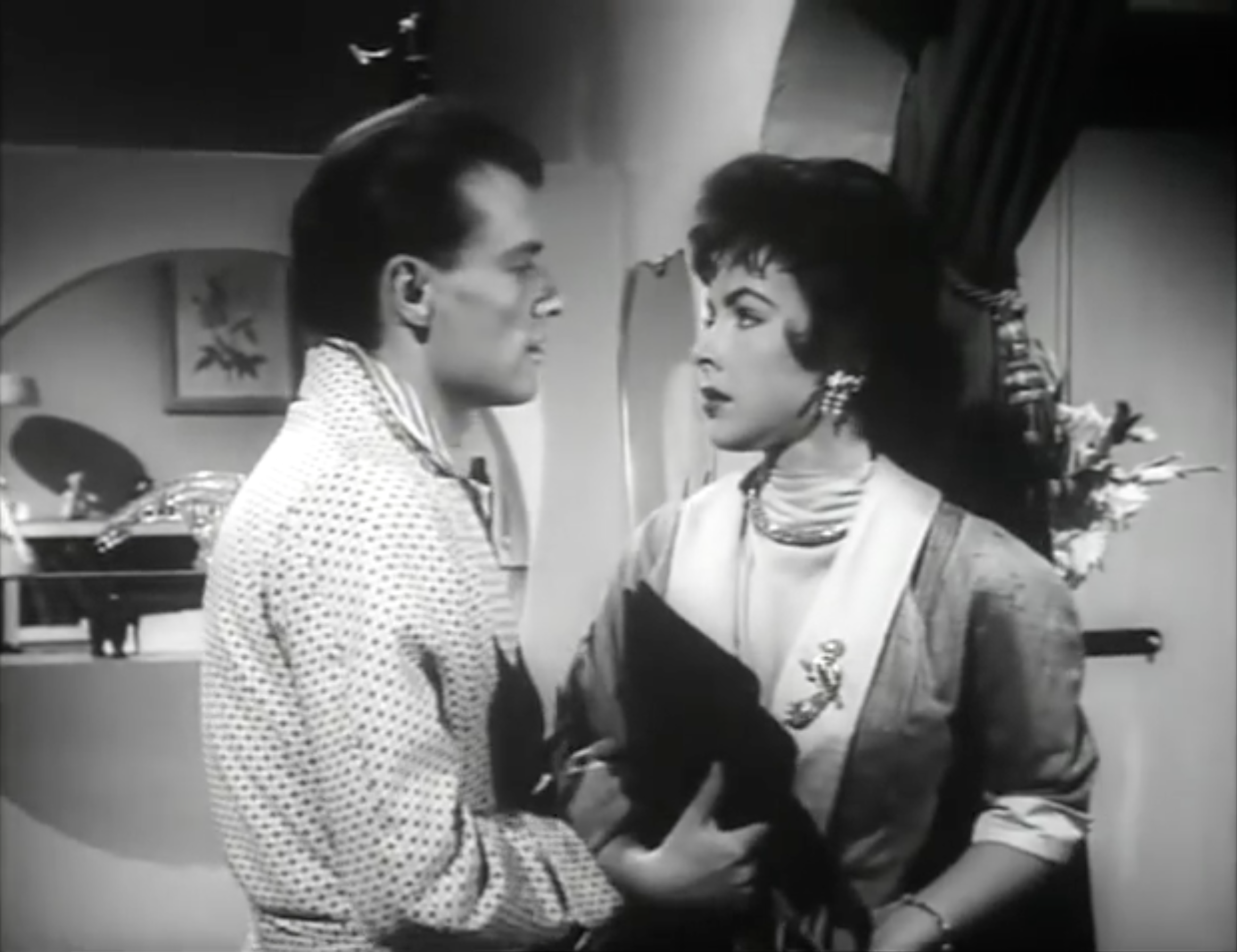
Giorgio Albertazzi and Mara Lane

Uomini ombra (Men in the Shadows) is a 1954 Italian spy film directed by Francesco De Robertis. It is notable as the first of only two films produced by Film Costellazione. It was one of the first films to feature Giorgio Albertazzi and the cast also includes Paolo Stoppa, one of the few actors who featured in more than one De Robertis film.

It centres around Italian naval secret agents who acquire a British codebook and Italian counter-espionage agents tracking enemy agents working undercover in Italy and providing false information.
