= Una lettera dall'Africa =

Una Lettera dall'Africa
- Directed by: Leonardo Bonzi, Maner Lualdi (uncredited)
- Produced by: Leonardo Bonzi
- Cinematography: Marco Scarpelli
- Production company: Istituto Luce
- Distributed by: DEAR Film
- Release date: 1951
- Country: Italy
- Language: Italian

Una Lettera dall'Africa is a 1951 Italian documentary film directed by Leonardo Bonzi, with Manulo Lualdi.

The film, a documentary, shot in then state-of-the art Ferrania Color in Northern Africa, was produced by the Istituto Luce and was distributed by DEAR Film. It was screened at the Venice Film Festival from 1 to 30 September 1951. In 2018 it was screened at the Crema Film Festival.

The film documents a trip by car from Tripoli, Libya, to Mogadishu, Somalia, covering the natural landscape and wildlife, and documenting various civilizations and local customs along the way. The film also documents historical events and the locations of the battles, and the work of Italian missionaries across the region. The trip takes the viewer along the Mediterranean coast and along the Nile. Una Lettera dall'Africa is described as having a journalistic tone with poetic elements.
