= Carla Vistarini =

Italian composer (born 1948)

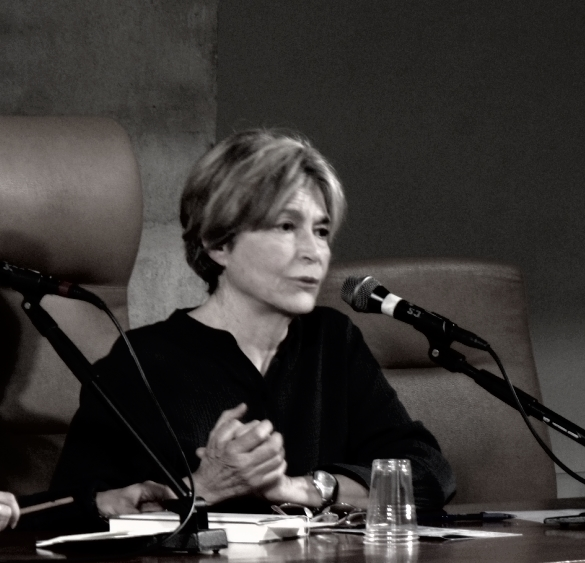
Vistarini at the Versi di Luce Film and Poetry Festival

Carla Vistarini (born 8 July 1948 in Rome) is an Italian lyricist, writer, playwright and scriptwriter.

The daughter of actor Franco Silva and the elder sister of actress Mita Medici, she has written songs for various major Italian artists such as Mina, Ornella Vanoni, Mia Martini, Patty Pravo, Riccardo Fogli, Peppino di Capri, Loretta Goggi, Raffaella Carrà, Renato Zero.

She has been artistic director of Sanremo Music Festival 1997 in trio with Giorgio Moroder and Pino Donaggio.

She won the David di Donatello Award in 1995 for best scriptwriting for Nemici d'infanzia.

She is the author of the TV program Pavarotti & Friends International, aired on Rai Uno from 1991 until 1998.

Her novel Se ho paura prendimi per mano (If I'm scared take my hand) was published in 2014. Se ricordi il mio nome (If you remember my name) was released in January 2018. She also wrote Le ragioni della scrittura (The reasons of writing).

== Songs written by Carla Vistarini ==
1970	Mi sei entrata nel cuore	Carla Vistarini	Luigi Lopez	The Showmen
1971	Denise	C. Vistarini	A. Minghi	Amedeo Minghi
1971	Una storia come tante	C. Vistarini	L. Lopez- E.Vianello	Mita Medici
1972	Ci sei tu	C. Vistarini	L. Lopez	Caterina Caselli
1973	Oh Mary	C. Vistarini, Faggeter, Dossena	L. Lopez	Riccardo Fogli
1973	Fratello in civiltà	C. Vistarini	A. Minghi	Amedeo Minghi
1973	Quei giorni	C. Vistarini	L. Lopez	Mita Medici
1974	Addormentata	C. Vistarini	L. Lopez-G.Leone	I Panda
1974	Mai	C. Vistarini-Depsa	T.Cicco	Peppino di Capri
1974	Complici	C. Vistarini	L. Lopez	Riccardo Fogli
1974	L'Artista	C. Vistarini	L. Lopez-P. Aloise	Nicola di Bari
1974	Nella testa di Nina	C. Vistarini	L. Lopez	Schola Cantorum
1974	E la notte è qui	C. Vistarini, Terzoli, Vaime	P. Calvi	Iva Zanicchi
1974	Se mi vuoi	C. Vistarini	T.Cicco	Cico
1974	La voglia di sognare	C. Vistarini	L. Lopez	Ornella Vanoni
1974	Quando dico di no	C. Vistarini	T. Cicco	Raffaella Carrà
1974	La prima volta insieme	C. Vistarini- Frank Robinson	F. Robinson	Massimo Ranieri
1974	Questo è lei	C. Vistarini	L.Lopez-D.Besquet	Sergio Leonardi
1974	Il dubbio	C. Vistarini	L.Lopez-G.Leone	Mita Medici
1975	Aladino	C. Vistarini- Shelley	Shelley	Sylvie Vartan
1975	E mia madre	C. Vistarini	T. Cicco	Cico
1975	Amanti mai	C. Vistarini	L.Lopez-Graefer	I Panda
1975	Questo amore sbagliato	C. Vistarini	L.Lopez	Patty Pravo
1975	Coriandoli su di noi	C. Vistarini, Terzoli, Vaime	M. De Martino	Ricchi e Poveri
1975	Loretta con la 'O'	C. Vistarini- Ebb	Kander	Loretta Goggi
1975	Guarda	C. Vistarini	R.Conrado	I Vianella
1975	Un piccolo ricordo	C. Vistarini	L.Lopez	Peppino di Capri
1975	Pirupirulì, Noi no	C. Vistarini, Terzoli, Vaime	M.De Martino	Sandra Mondaini, Raimondo Vianello
1975	Blue	C. Vistarini	B.Solo	Bobby Solo
1976	Mondo	C. Vistarini	L.Lopez	Riccardo Fogli
1976	Le cicale	C. Vistarini	L.Lopez	Patty Pravo
1976	E mia Madre	C. Vistarini	T.Cicco	Raffaella Carrà
1976	La mia Bohème	C. Vistarini	Polito	Massimo Ranieri
1976	La gente dice	C. Vistarini	T.Cicco	Cico
1976	Eppure è amore	C. Vistarini	Del Turco-Bianchi	Patty Pravo
1976	Ti voglio dire	C. Vistarini	L.Lopez	Riccardo Fogli
1976	Anvedi chi c'è	C. Vistarini	R.Conrado	I Vianella
1976	Piccola anima	C. Vistarini	L.Lopez	Alice
1977	Cantando	C. Vistarini	Lopez, Cicco, Vaona	I Fantasy
1977	Voglia di morire	C. Vistarini	L.Lopez-P.Aloise	I Panda
1977	Compagni di viaggio	C. Vistarini-P.Dossena	L.Lopez	Gilda Giuliani
1977	Sognare è vita	C. Vistarini	L.Lopez	Mia Martini
1977	Piccoli amori	C. Vistarini	L.Lopez	Mara Cubeddu
1977	Notturno	C. Vistarini	Ciaikovskj	I Panda
1977	Ritratto di donna	C. Vistarini	L.Lopez-M.Cantini	Mia Martini
1977	Dimenticare	C. Vistarini	Vangelis	I Panda
1977	Un'isola	C. Vistarini	L.Lopez	Alice
1977	Stella	C. Vistarini	L.Lopez	Riccardo Fogli
1977	Questo è lui	C. Vistarini	L.Lopez-D.Besquet	Claudia Mori
1977	Ricordati	C. Vistarini	L.Lopez	Riccardo Fogli
1977	Seta trasparente	C. Vistarini	C.Mattone	Gianni Nazzaro
1977	Carta geografica	C. Vistarini	T. Cicco	Cico
1977	Stelle e uva spina	C. Vistarini	M.De Sica	Manuel De Sica
1977	Uomini	C. Vistarini	T. Cripezzi	I Camaleonti
1977	Vorrei esser te per un po'	C. Vistarini-Kasha	Hirschorn	Daniela Goggi
1978	Ti voglio dire	C. Vistarini	L.Lopez	Riccardo Fogli
1978	Ironia	C. Vistarini	T.Cicco	Cico
1978	Stryx	Vistarini, Testa	T. De Vita	Tony De Vita
1978	Piccolo Pierrot	C. Vistarini	F.Ricciardi	Il Diario
1978	Un fiore	C. Vistarini	L.Lopez	Alice
1979	Pace	C. Vistarini	L.Lopez, Ullu	Riccardo Fogli
1979	Come una volta	C. Vistarini	L.Lopez	Riccardo Fogli
1980	Buonanotte Buonanotte	C. Vistarini	M.Cantini	Mina
1980	Ballo tutto	C. Vistarini	L.Lopez	Don Lurio
1980	Amare è	C. Vistarini	L.Lopez	Franco Dani
1980	Forte Forte Piano Piano	C. Vistarini	T.Cicco	Cico
1980	Pinocchio perché no?	C. Vistarini	L.Lopez-M.Cantini	Luigi Lopez e la Gang di Pinocchio
1981	Cybernella	C. Vistarini	L.Lopez-Cantini	I Vianella
1981	Non sparate sulla luna	C. Vistarini	L.Lopez	Roberta Rei
1981	Rendez-vous pour une jeune fille	C. Vistarini, Del Re	M.Migliardi	Richard Clayderman
1981	Con te Bambino	C. Vistarini	L.lopez	I Vianella
1981	Amica Amante mia	C. Vistarini-Gonzales	Jairò	Jairò
1982	Mi piace tanto la gente	C. Vistarini	L.Lopez-N.Kipner	Mina
1982	La voglia di sognare	C. Vistarini	L.Lopez	Riccardo Fogli
1982	Juke Box	C. Vistarini-Depsa-Jurgens	Pirazzoli	Plastic Bertrand
1982	Stanno suonando la nostra canzone	C. Vistarini-Bayer Sager	M.Hamlisch	Loretta Goggi & Gigi Proietti
1982	Se mi conoscesse	C. Vistarini-Bayer Sager	M.Hamlisch	Gigi Proietti
1983	Credo ancora nell'amore	C. Vistarini-Bayer Sager	M.Hamlish	Loretta Goggi
1983	La fantastica Mimì	C. Vistarini	L.Lopez-M.Cantini	Giorgia Lepore
1983	Ci sei	C. Vistarini	G.Faiella	Peppino di Capri
1983	Notte a colori	C. Vistarini	L.Lopez	Minnie Minoprio
1983	Barnum-I colori della mia vita	C. Vistarini, Crawford	C.Coleman	Ottavia Piccolo
1983	Barnum- Fuori forse	C. Vistarini, Crawford	C.Coleman	Massimo Ranieri
1984	Fuoco Fuoco	Vistarini, Mancini, Ferri	R.Castellari	Piccoli Fans
1985	Centomila volte ancora	C. Vistarini	T.Malco	Little Tony
1985	Mentre il tempo va via	C. Vistarini	T.Malco	Tony Malco
1986	Com'era bello il mondo (l'uomo nello spazio)	Vistarini, Castellacci, Proietti	G.Lombardi	Gigi Proietti
1986	Io a modo mio	C. Vistarini, Castellacci, Proietti	G.Lombardi	Gigi Proietti
1987	Appassionati	C. Vistarini	L.Lopez	Rita Pavone
1987	La voglia di sognare	C. Vistarini	L.Lopez	Robot
1987	Discolina	C. Vistarini	T.Savio	Daniela Goggi
1988	Senza l'amore	C. Vistarini	L.Lopez	Alice
1988	Via Teulada 66	C. Vistarini	T.Savio	Teulada 66
1990	La nevicata del '56	C. Vistarini-Califano	L.Lopez-Cantini	Mia Martini
1990	La Nevada	Vistarini, Califano, Mijares	Lopez, Cantini	Mijares
1991	Crème Caramel	Vistarini-Pingitore	P. Pintucci	Piero Pintucci
1994	Cos'è	Vistarini-Elfman	Elfman	Renato Zero
1994	Re del Blu Re del Mai	Vistarini-Elfman	Elfman	Renato Zero
1994	Povero Jack	C. Vistarini-D.Elfman	D.Elfman	Renato Zero
1997	S O S verso il blu	C. Vistarini	L.Lopez	Mia Martini
2005	Voglio una canzone	C. Vistarini, Perini, Cautero	L.Lopez, Cantini, Scarpulla, Cozzi	Pap's and Scar's
2005	Per Darti Tutto Di Me	C. Vistarini	Pierre Bachelet	Patrizia Grillo
2013	La tua Africa	C. Vistarini	T.Cicco	Tony Cicco & Formula 3
2017	Cartoline	C. Vistarini	T.Cicco	Tony Cicco
2022	Le Ragazze del 1960	C. Vistarini	F. Micalizzi	Franco Micalizzi feat. Cristiana Polegri
2022	L'ultima notte	C. Vistarini	F. Micalizzi	Franco Micalizzi feat. Frankie Lovecchio
