= Brief Rapture =

1951 film

- Directed by: Enzo Trapani
- Written by: Enzo Trapani; Leopoldo Trieste
- Starring: Amedeo Nazzari; Lois Maxwell; Umberto Spadaro
- Cinematography: Bitto Albertini
- Edited by: Renato Cinquini
- Music by: Charlie Beal; Vincenzo Falcomata; Benito Pérez
- Production company: Perla Film
- Release date: 1 February 1951
- Running time: 100 minutes
- Country: Italy
- Language: Italian

Brief Rapture (Italian: Lebbra bianca) is a 1951 Italian drama film directed by Enzo Trapani and starring Amedeo Nazzari, Lois Maxwell and Umberto Spadaro. An Italian war veteran teams up with a police inspector to pursue the drug-dealing gang who have killed his sister.

It was shot at the SACI Studios in Rome.

== Plot ==
Stefano returns to Rome to look for Lucia, a sister he hasn't heard of for months now. Lucia works with a rich family, Stefano goes to the family and finds in Lucia's suitcase an address of a pension, when he arrives at the pension he meets Erika a foreign girl who is a friend of Lucia, but Erika has no information to give him. Stefano who has fallen in love with Erika goes with her to a dance hall where he works, when he arrives at the club he comes into contact with a gang of cocaine traffickers; discovering that Erika is their contact. At this point Stefano goes to a clandestine gambling den and while there is a police raid he learns that Lucia has committed suicide in the Tiber. The traffickers responsible for Lucia's death, fearful of retaliation by Stefano, order Erika to kill him, Erika reveals everything to Stefano, and together they will face the traffickers.

== Main cast ==
- Amedeo Nazzari as Francesco Leverrier
- Umberto Spadaro as Police chief
- Lois Maxwell as Erika
- Ermanno Randi as Stefano Ferrari
- Juan de Landa as Boss
- Sophia Loren as A girl in the boardinghouse
- Folco Lulli
- Silvio Bagolini as Gorini
- Gilberto Mazzi as Alfonso
- Massimo Sallusti as Carlo

== Bibliography ==
- Piero Pruzzo & Enrico Lancia. Amedeo Nazzari. Gremese Editore, 1983.
