= Rate Furlan =

Italian actor, screenwriter and film director

- Born: 9 March 1911; Padua, Veneto; Italy
- Died: 28 November 1989 (aged 78); Rome, Lazio, Italy
- Occupations: Actor, writer, composer, director
- Years active: 1948–1988 (film)

Rate Furlan (1911–1989) was an Italian actor, composer, screenwriter and film director.

== Selected filmography ==
- La figlia della Madonna (1949)
- Lo Zappatore (1950)
- Malavita (1951)
- Melody of Love (1952)
- Arrivederci Firenze (1958)
- The Huns (1960)
- Antonio Gramsci: The Days of Prison (1977)
- The Belly of an Architect (1987)

== Bibliography ==
- Chiti, Roberto & Poppi, Roberto. Dizionario del cinema italiano: Dal 1945 al 1959. Gremese Editore, 1991.
