= Trieste mia! =

- Directed by: Mario Costa
- Music by: Ennio Porrino
- Release date: 1951
- Country: Italy
- Language: Italian

Trieste mia!, alternately titled Trieste del mio cuore, is a 1951 Italian war melodrama film directed by Mario Costa.

== Cast ==
- Aldo Silvani as Giovanni
- Milly Vitale as Anna
- Luciano Taioli as Luciano
- Ermanno Randi as Alberto
- Mirko Ellis as Karl
- Dante Maggio
- Saro Urzì
- Nando Bruno
