= Patto d'amicizia =

- Release date: 1951
- Country: Italy
- Language: Italian

Patto d'amicizia is a 1951 Italian film.
