= Zona pericolosa =

- Directed by: Francesco Maselli
- Cinematography: Pier Ludovico Pavoni
- Music by: Angelo Francesco Lavagnino
- Release date: 1951 (Italy)
- Running time: 10 minutes
- Country: Italy

Zona pericolosa is a 1951 Italian short documentary film directed by Francesco Maselli.

== Legacy ==
Sport minore was screened at the Cinemateca Portuguesa in 2013.
