= Francesco Maselli =

Italian film director (1930–2023)

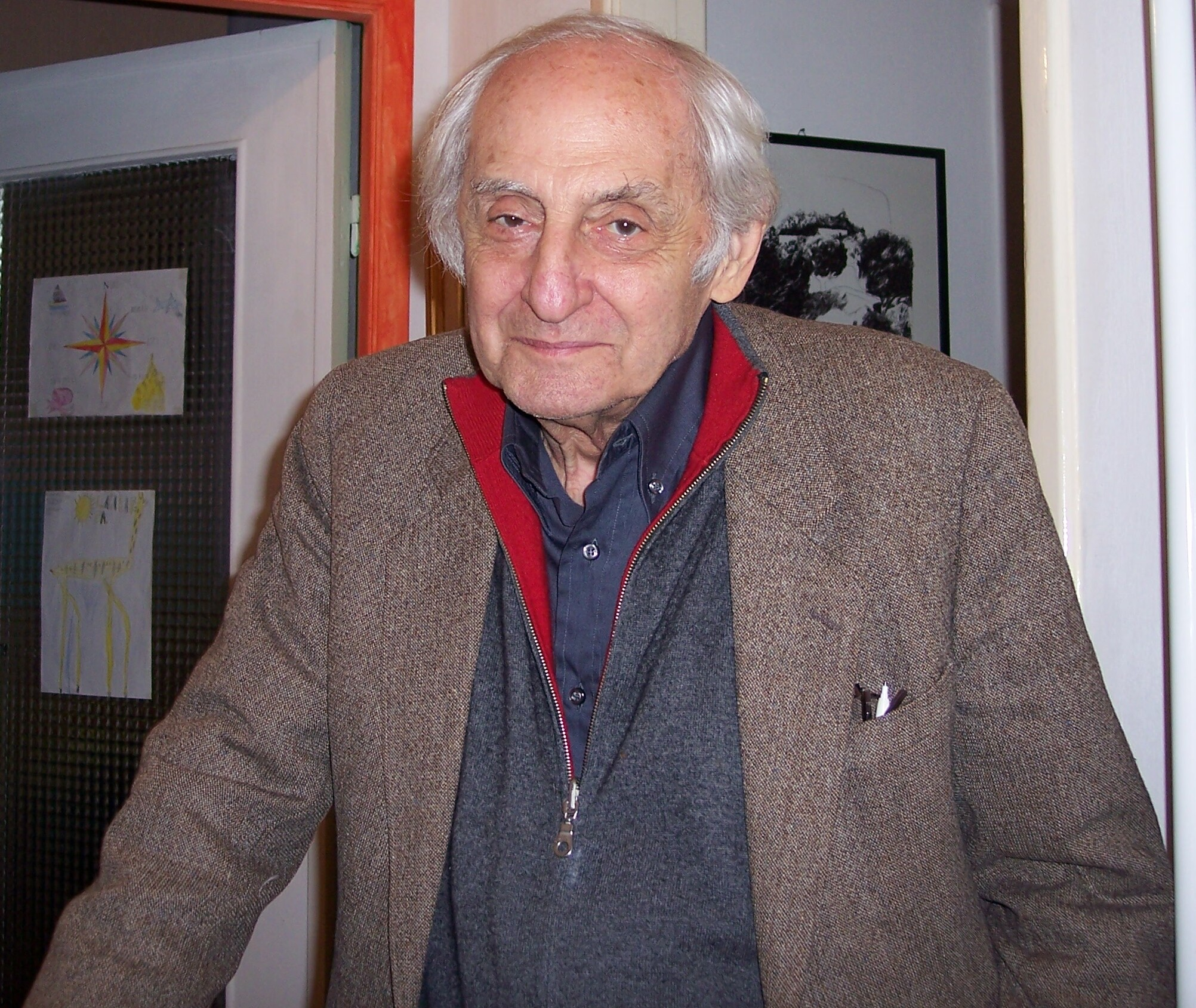
- Maselli in 2010
- Born: 9 December 1930; Rome, Italy
- Died: 21 March 2023 (aged 92); Rome, Italy
- Other name: Citto Maselli
- Occupations: Film director, screenwriter
- Political party: PCI (1948–1991); PRC (1991–2023)

Francesco Maselli (9 December 1930 – 21 March 2023), also known as Citto Maselli, was an Italian film director and screenwriter.

== Biography ==
Born into a well educated family (his father was an art critic) originally from the Molise region, Maselli graduated from the Italian National Film School in 1949 and began his career as an assistant and assistant director for Luigi Chiarini, Michelangelo Antonioni, and Luchino Visconti. After directing several short documentary and fiction films, he gave his feature film debut with the World War II drama Abandoned (1955), which premiered at the Venice Film Festival. Following a series of minor films, Maselli had greater success with Silver Spoon Set (1960, also titled The Dolphins) and Time of Indifference (1964), an adaptation of a novel by Alberto Moravia.

In the 1970s, Maselli turned to openly left-wing political films, notably Lettera aperta a un giornale della sera (1970) and The Suspect (1975), before shifting to more intimate films centered on female protagonists in the 1980s such as A Tale of Love (1986) and The Secret (1990).

In 2021, Maselli was honoured with a retrospective at the Venice Film Festival, where many of his films had seen their premiere. Maselli died in Rome on 21 March 2023, at the age of 92.

== Selected filmography ==
=== Director ===
==== Feature films ====
- L'amore in città (1953) (episode "Storia di Caterina")
- Abandoned (1955)
- The Doll That Took the Town (1956)
- Silver Spoon Set (1960)
- Le italiane e l'amore (1961) (episode "Le adolescenti e l'amore")
- Time of Indifference (1964)
- Kill Me Quick, I'm Cold (1967)
- A Fine Pair (1968)
- Lettera aperta a un giornale della sera (1970)
- The Suspect (1975)
- Tre operai (1980) (TV film)
- A Tale of Love (1986)
- Private Access (1988)
- L'alba (1990)
- The Secret (1990)
- Intolerance (1996) (episode "Pietas")
- Cronache del terzo millennio (1996)
- Il compagno (1999) (TV film)
- Civico zero (2007)
- The Red Shadows (2009)
- Scossa (2011) (episode "Sciacalli")

==== Documentaries ====
- Tibet proibito (1949)
- Bagnaia, villaggio italiano (1949)
- Finestre (1950)
- Zona pericolosa (1951)
- Stracciaroli (1951)
- Sport minore (1951)
- Bambini (1951)
- Ombrelli (1952)
- Uno spettacolo di pupi (1953)
- I fiori (1953)
- Festa dei morti in Sicilia (1953)
- Città che dorme (1953)
- Cantamaggio a Cervarezza (1954)
- Bambini al cinema (1956)
- Adolescenza (1959)
- La suola romana (1960)
- L'addio a Enrico Berlinguer (1984) (collective documentary)
- Un altro mondo è possibile (2001) (collective documentary)
- Lettere dalla Palestina (2002)
- Firenze, il nostro domani (2003)
- Frammenti di Novecento (2005)

=== Actor ===
- Lettera aperta a un giornale della sera (1970) – Man from Beograd (uncredited)
- Amarcord (1973) – Bongioanni (uncredited)
- La terrazza (1980) – Himself
- And the Ship Sails On (1983) – Guardiano del rinoceronte (uncredited)
- The Name of the Rose (1986) – Swineherd #3
- Alfonso Sansone produttore per caso (2014) – Himself

== Awards ==
- 1986: Venice Film Festival Grand Jury Prize for A Tale of Love
