= Black Fire (film) =

- Directed by: Silvio Siano
- Written by: Guido Malatesta
- Cinematography: Romolo Garroni
- Music by: Franco Langella
- Release date: 1951
- Country: Italy
- Language: Italian

Fuoco nero is a black-and-white 1951 Italian melodrama film. It was released as Black Fire in the U.S.

== Cast ==
- Otello Toso
- Franca Marzi
- Delia Scala
- Saro Urzì
- Renato Valente
- Charles Rutherford
- Giovanna Scotto
- Attilio Dottesio (credited as Aldo Dottesio)
- Checco Durante
- Elio Steiner
- Renato Malavasi
- Marilyn Buferd
