= Aldo Nicodemi =

Italian film actor

- Born: 8 October 1919; Viterbo, Lazio, Italy
- Died: 6 October 1963 (aged 43); Montalto di Castro, Lazio, Italy
- Occupation: Actor
- Years active: 1948–1963 (film)

Aldo Nicodemi (1919–1963) was an Italian film actor.

== Filmography ==
Year	Title	Role	Notes
1948	Les Misérables, part 1	Marius	Uncredited
1948	Tempesta su Parigi, part 2 of Les Misérables	Marius	
1948	The Mysterious Rider	Il conte Orloff, favorito dell'imperatrice Caterina II	Uncredited
1949	William Tell	Rudens	
1949	Chains	Emilio	
1949	Napoli eterna canzone	Baron Mario Drago	
1950	Torment	Ruffini	
1950	Margaret of Cortona	Marco	
1951	Four Red Roses	Massimo	
1951	Malavita	Renato	
1952	The Eternal Chain	Filippo Lanza	
1952	Cuore forestiero	Giovanni	
1952	Il Tenente Giorgio	Tenente amico di Giorgio	Uncredited
1952	Who Is Without Sin	L'avvocato	
1954	Loves of Three Queens		(Segment: The Face That Launched a Thousand Ships), Uncredited
1964	The Vampire of the Opera	Man	(final film role)
