= Metano =

- Release date: 1951
- Country: Italy
- Language: Italian

Metano is a 1951 Italian film.
