= Appunti su un fatto di cronaca =

- Directed by: Luchino Visconti
- Music by: Franco Mannino
- Release date: 1951
- Country: Italy
- Language: Italian

Appunti su un fatto di cronaca (lit. Notes on a News Story) is a 1951 Italian documentary film directed by Luchino Visconti.

== Premise ==
The film documents the real rape and murder of Annarella Bracci, 12, perpetrated on 18 January 1950, in Primavalle.

== Cast ==
- Vasco Pratolini: Narrator (voice)
