= Malavita (1951 film) =

1951 film

- Directed by: Rate Furlan
- Written by: Roberto Amoroso; Rate Furlan
- Produced by: Anna D'Agostino
- Starring: Jacqueline Pierreux; Aldo Nicodemi; Franco Silva
- Cinematography: Giuseppe Caracciolo
- Edited by: Jolanda Benvenuti
- Music by: Rate Furlan
- Production company: Melody Film
- Distributed by: Variety Distribution
- Release date: 1951
- Running time: 95 minutes
- Country: Italy
- Language: Italian

Malavita is a 1951 Italian crime melodrama film directed by Rate Furlan and starring Jacqueline Pierreux, Aldo Nicodemi and Franco Silva. It was shot at the Sud Film Studios in Naples.

== Synopsis ==
In Naples a young man from a good family is drawn into a crime gang by the alluring Lidia. During a raid on a foreign cargo ship in the city's port his police officer brother is killed and the blame laid on him by Lidia. Joining the gang, despite himself he is forced to plunder a foreign ship that arrived in the port of Naples with a rich cargo, Mario, Renato's brother and finance sergeant, is on duty at the port, Lidia is used by the gang as a decoy to distract Mario, on the evening of the blow while the bandits are preparing to plunder the ship, Renato unaware surprises Mario and Lidia together in intimate attitudes, the two brothers get into a fight, Renato shoots on his brother without hitting him, but also shoots Lidia hitting Mario mortally.

Lidia accuses Renato of killing his brother out of jealousy. Renato, however, feeling responsible for the death of his brother, constitutes himself and will be sentenced to life imprisonment. After some time Lidia, her lover and the rest of the gang are involved in a shooting with the police forces, on the verge of death taken by remorse, Lidia confesses that she is responsible for the murder of the sergeant, definitively exonerating Renato.

== Cast ==
- Jacqueline Pierreux as Lidia
- Aldo Nicodemi as Renato
- Franco Silva as Serg. Mario
- Clelia Genovese as Madre di Lidia
- Flora Torrigiani as Wanda
- Harry Feist as Capo Banda
- Angelo Dessy as Membro della banda
- Luigi Uzzo as Pinuccio, figlio di Mario

== Bibliography ==
- Chiti, Roberto & Poppi, Roberto. Dizionario del cinema italiano: Dal 1945 al 1959. Gremese Editore, 1991.
