= Renato Valente =

Italian film actor

- Born: 25 September 1924
- Died: 18 October 1989 (aged 65 years)
- Occupation: Actor
- Years active: 1948-1951 (film)

Renato Valente was an Italian film actor who appeared in a mixture of lead and supporting roles during the 1940s and early 1950s.

== Selected filmography ==
- The Beggar's Daughter (1950)
- Beauties on Bicycles (1951)
- Black Fire (1951)
- Destiny (1951)
- The Mysteries of Venice (1951)

== Bibliography ==
- Giacomo Gambetti. Vittorio Gassmann. Gremese Editore, 1999.
