= The Lovers of Ravello =

Italian melodrama film (1961)

- Directed by: Francesco De Robertis
- Written by: Luigi Capuano; Francesco De Robertis; Armando Fizzarotti; Vittorio Minnucci; Giorgio Prosperi
- Starring: Lida Baarova; Gabriele Ferzetti; Carlo Ninchi
- Cinematography: Carlo Bellero
- Music by: Annibale Bizzelli
- Production company: Incine Industria Cinematografica Italiana
- Release date: 1951
- Running time: 88 minutes
- Country: Italy
- Language: Italian

The Lovers of Ravello (Italian: Gli amanti di Ravello) is a 1951 Italian melodrama film directed by Francesco De Robertis and starring Lida Baarova, Gabriele Ferzetti and Carlo Ninchi.

The film's sets were designed by the art director Alfredo Montori.

== Main cast ==
- Lida Baarova as Ida
- Gabriele Ferzetti as Sandro Deodata
- Leonora Ruffo as Bruna Falchi
- Carlo Ninchi as Matteo
- Olga Solbelli as governante
- Rino Salviati as Mario
- Nino Milano as Gennarino
- Alberto Nucci as Dario
- Ivana Ferri as Ragazza
- Cesira Vianello as Ispettrice
- Aristide Spelta as Arciprete
- Attilio Tosato as Amministratore

== Bibliography ==
- Enrico Lancia & Roberto Poppi. Le attrici: dal 1930 ai giorni nostri. Gremese Editore, 2003.
