= Italian neorealism =

Italian film movement

- A still shot from Rome, Open City, by Roberto Rossellini (1945)
- Years active: 1943–1952
- Location: Italy
- Major figures: Roberto Rossellini, Vittorio De Sica, Cesare Zavattini, Luchino Visconti, Giuseppe De Santis, Suso Cecchi d'Amico, Federico Fellini, Bruno Caruso, Michelangelo Antonioni
- Influences: Poetic realism, Marxism, Christian humanism
- Influenced: French New Wave, Cinema Novo, Parallel Cinema, Iranian New Wave

Italian neorealism (Italian: Neorealismo), also known as the Golden Age of Italian Cinema, was a national film movement in Italy in the aftermath of World War II. It explored the contemporary everyday life and struggles of the poor and the working class, addressing the difficult economic and moral conditions of the country changes in the Italian psyche. Frequent topics include poverty, oppression, injustice and despair. Films of the era were filmed on location, frequently with non-professional actors.

Italian neorealist films have become explanatory discourse for future generations to understand the history of Italy during a specific period through the storytelling of social life in the context, reflecting the documentary and communicative nature of the film. Although some have traced the origin of Italian neorealistic films to Soviet montage films, Soviet filmmakers often described the people's opposition to class struggle through their films, while neorealist films aimed more broadly to showcase individuals' resistance to reality in a social environment.

== History ==
Italian neorealism came about as World War II ended and Benito Mussolini's government fell, causing the Italian film industry to lose its centre. Neorealism was a sign of cultural and social change in Italy. New realism films are considered to be films with specific styles and philosophies that emerged during the turbulent period after World War II. Its films presented contemporary stories and ideas and were often shot on location as the Cinecittà film studios had been damaged significantly during the war.

The neorealist style was developed by a circle of film critics that revolved around the magazine Cinema, including:

- Luchino Visconti
- Gianni Puccini
- Cesare Zavattini
- Giuseppe De Santis
- Pietro Ingrao

Largely prevented from writing about politics (the editor-in-chief of the magazine was Vittorio Mussolini, son of Benito Mussolini), the critics attacked the Telefoni Bianchi ("white telephone") films that dominated the industry at the time. As a counter to the popular mainstream films, some critics felt that Italian cinema should turn to the realist writers from the turn of the 20th century.

Wandering Musicians by Italian neorealist artist Bruno Caruso (1953)

Many of the filmmakers involved in neorealism developed their skills working on Calligrafismo films in the early 1940s (although the short-lived movement was markedly different from neorealism). Elements of neorealism are also found in the films of Alessandro Blasetti and the documentary-style films of Francesco De Robertis. Two of the most significant precursors of neorealism are Jean Renoir's Toni (1935) and Blasetti's 1860 (1934). Both Visconti and Michelangelo Antonioni worked closely with Renoir.

In the spring of 1945, Mussolini was executed and Italy was liberated from German occupation. This period, known as the "Italian Spring", broke from old ways and fostered a more realistic approach to making films. Italian cinema went from utilizing elaborate studio sets to shooting on location in the countryside and city streets in a realist style.

Although the true beginning of neorealism has been widely contested by theorists and filmmakers, the first neorealist film is generally thought to be Visconti's Ossessione, released in 1943, during the occupation. Neorealism became famous globally in 1946 with Roberto Rossellini's Rome, Open City, when it won the Grand Prize at the Cannes Film Festival as the first major film produced in Italy after the war.

Italian neorealism rapidly declined in the early 1950s. Liberal and socialist parties were having difficulties presenting their message. The vision of the existing poverty and despair, presented by neorealist cinema, was demoralizing a nation anxious for prosperity and change. Additionally, the first positive effects of the Italian economic miracle period—such as gradual rises in income levels—caused the themes of neorealism to lose their relevance. As a consequence, most Italians favored the optimism shown in many American movies of the time. The views of the post-war Italian government of the time were also far from positive, and the remark of Giulio Andreotti, who was then a vice-minister in the De Gasperi cabinet, characterized the official view of the movement: Neorealism is "dirty laundry that shouldn't be washed and hung to dry in the open".

Italy's move from individual concern with neorealism to the tragic frailty of the human condition can be seen through Federico Fellini's films. His early works La Strada (1954) and Il bidone (1955) are transitional movies. The larger social concerns of humanity, treated by neorealists, gave way to the exploration of individuals. Their needs, their alienation from society and their tragic failure to communicate became the main focal point in the Italian films to follow in the 1960s. Similarly, Antonioni's Red Desert (1964) and Blow-up (1966) take the neorealist trappings and internalise them in the suffering and search for knowledge brought out by Italy's post-war economic and political climate.

In the early 1950s the neorealist torch was picked up by artists like Sicily's Bruno Caruso, whose work focused on the warehouses, shipyards and psychiatric wards of his native Palermo.

== Characteristics ==
Bicycle Thieves by Vittorio De Sica (1948)

Neorealist films were generally filmed with nonprofessional actors, although in a number of cases, well-known actors were cast in leading roles, playing strongly against their normal character types in front of a background populated by local people rather than extras brought in for the film.

They were shot almost exclusively on location, mostly in rundown cities as well as rural areas.

Neorealist films typically explore the conditions of the poor and the lower working class. Characters often exist within a simple social order where survival is the primary objective. Performances are mostly constructed from scenes of people performing fairly mundane and quotidian activities, devoid of the self-consciousness that amateur acting usually entails. Neorealist films often feature children in major roles, though their characters are frequently more observational than participatory. These characters are both sympathetic and cynical, constantly portraying the pain, misfortune, social struggles, and working-class struggles in social life, with the aim of criticizing the injustice of the real social system and resisting reality.

In terms of production, the new realism film adopts a documentary format, striving to showcase historicity, and striving to use the least cutting and video editing techniques, as well as tolerance for filming equipment.

Open City established several of the principles of neorealism, depicting clearly the struggle of normal Italian people to live from day to day under the extraordinary difficulties of the German occupation of Rome, consciously doing what they can to resist the occupation. The children play a key role in this, and their presence at the end of the film is indicative of their role in neorealism as a whole: as observers of the difficulties of today who hold the key to the future. Vittorio De Sica's 1948 film Bicycle Thieves is also representative of the genre, with non-professional actors, and a story that details the hardships of working-class life after the war. This movie focuses on exploring the concerns and behaviors of struggling working-class characters through the presentation of outstanding non professional actors. The light portrayal of events reveals the indifference, dirtiness, and violence of society, showcasing the conflict between public and private perspectives.

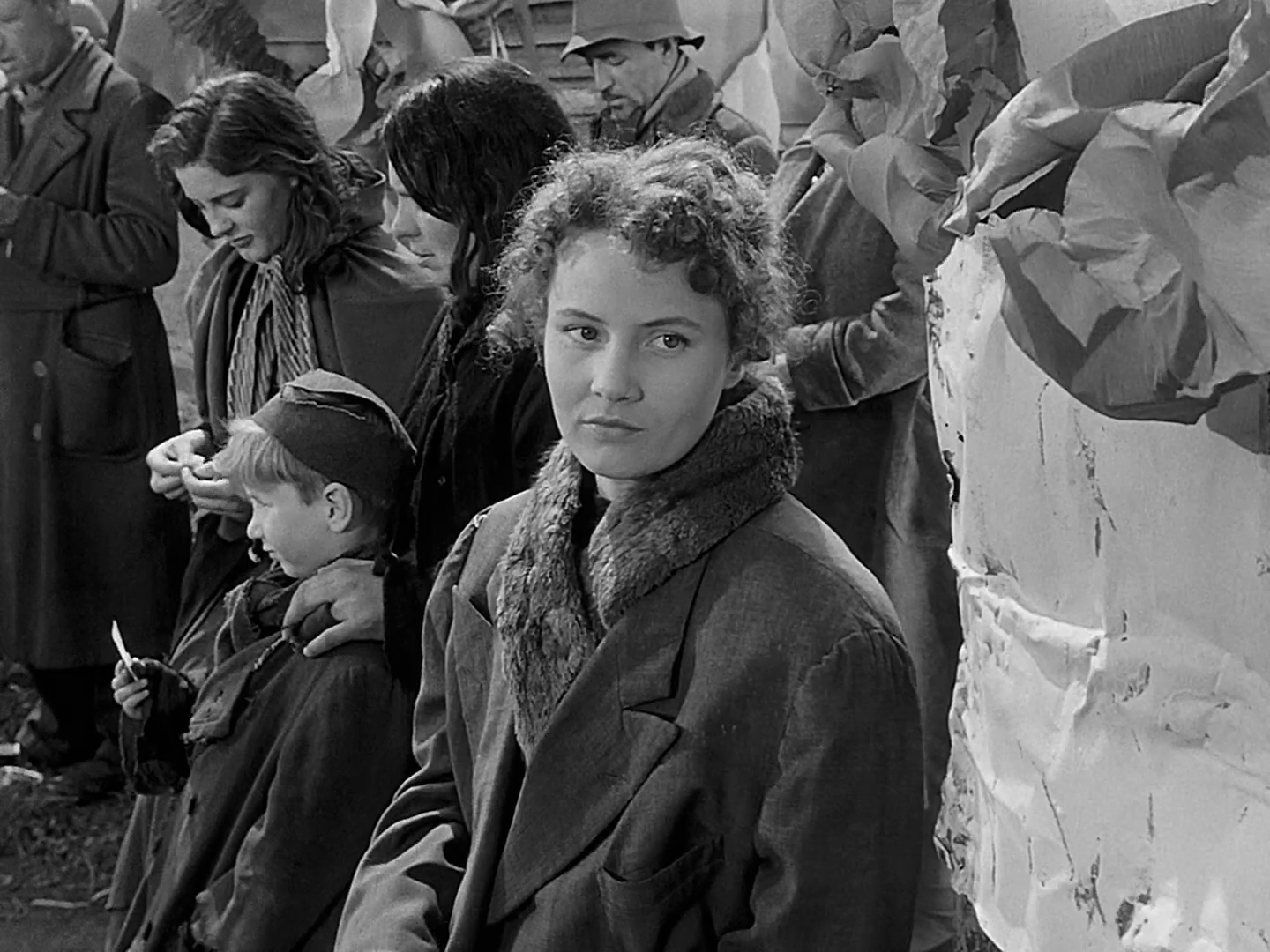
Miracle in Milan by Vittorio De Sica (1951)

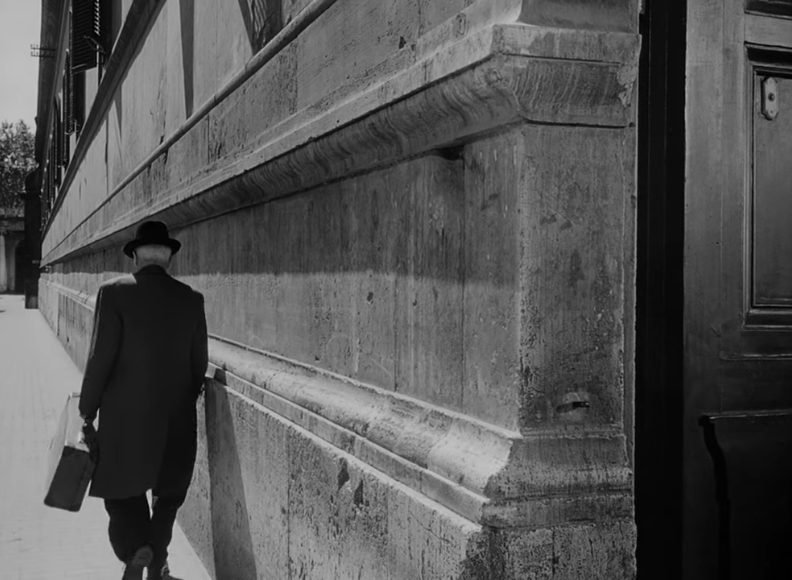
Umberto D. by Vittorio De Sica (1952)

In the period from 1944 to 1948, many neorealist filmmakers drifted away from pure neorealism. Some directors explored allegorical fantasy, such as de Sica's Miracle in Milan, and historical spectacle, like Senso by Visconti. It was also the time period when a more upbeat neorealism emerged, which produced films that melded working-class characters with 1930s-style populist comedy, as seen in de Sica's Umberto D.

At the height of neorealism, in 1948, Visconti adapted I Malavoglia, a novel by Giovanni Verga, written during the 19th century realist verismo movement, bringing the story to a modern setting, which resulted in remarkably little change in either the plot or the tone. The resulting film, The Earth Trembles, starred only nonprofessional actors and was filmed in the same village (Aci Trezza) in which the novel was set.

More contemporary theorists of Italian neorealism characterize it less as a consistent set of stylistic characteristics and more as the relationship between film practice and the social reality of post-war Italy. Millicent Marcus delineates the lack of consistent film styles of neorealist film. Peter Brunette and Marcia Landy both deconstruct the use of reworked cinematic forms in Rossellini's Open City. Using psychoanalysis, Vincent Rocchio characterizes neorealist film as consistently engendering the structure of anxiety into the structure of the plot itself.

== Impact ==
The period between 1943 and 1950 in the history of Italian cinema was dominated by the impact of neorealism, which was properly defined as a moment or a trend in Italian film rather than an actual school or group of theoretically motivated and like-minded directors and scriptwriters. Its impact nevertheless has been enormous not only on Italian film but also on French New Wave cinema, the Polish Film School, Brazilian Cinema Novo and ultimately on films all over the world. It also influenced film directors of India's Parallel Cinema movement, including Satyajit Ray (who directed the award-winning Apu Trilogy) and Bimal Roy (who made Do Bigha Zameen [1953]), both heavily influenced by Vittorio De Sica's Bicycle Thieves (1948).

The birth and development of Italian neorealism films marked the transition of the world film center from Europe and the United States, where classicism was prevalent before World War II, to Europe, where realism was prevalent.

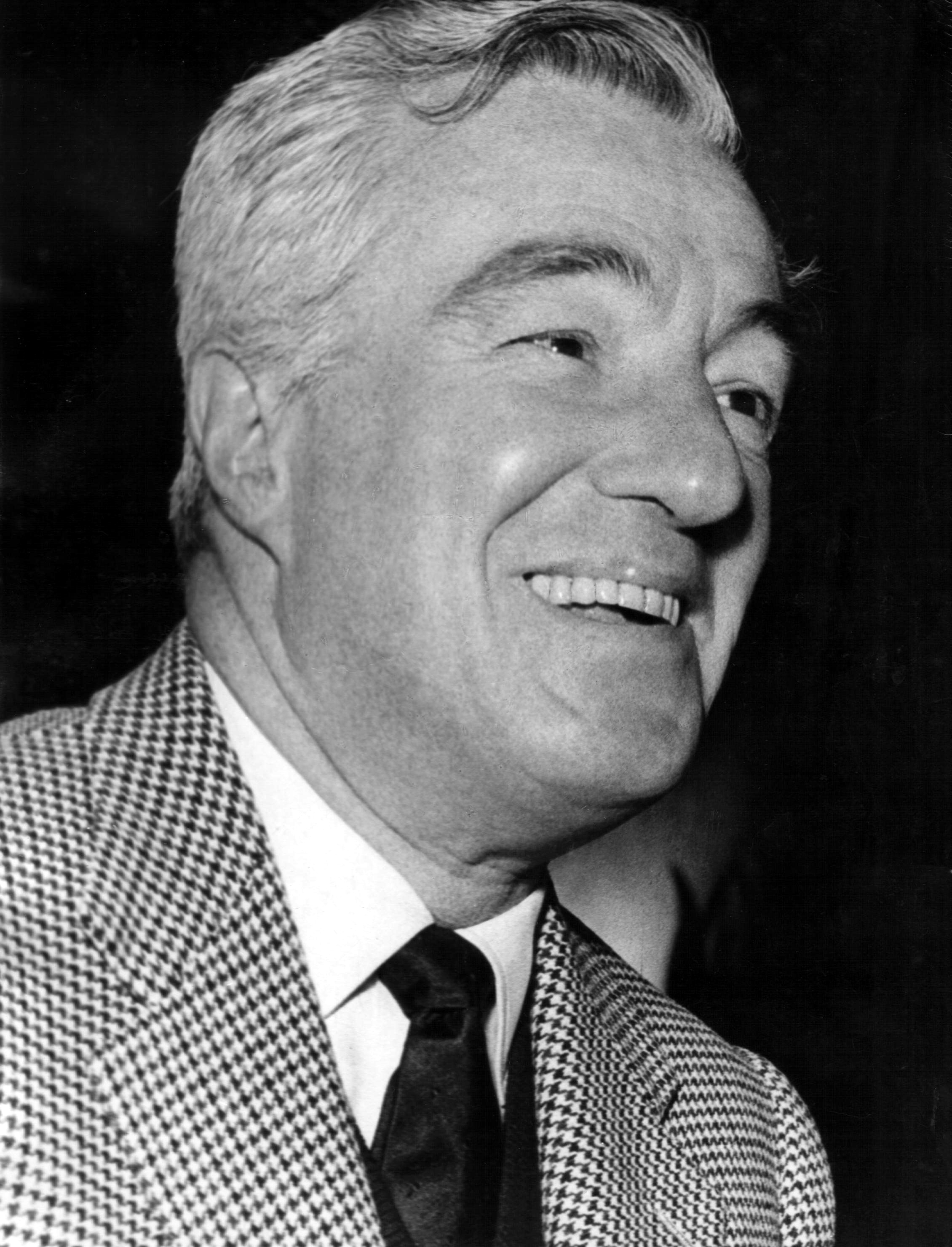
Vittorio De Sica, a leading figure in the neorealist movement and one of the world's most acclaimed and influential filmmakers of all time

Furthermore, as some critics have argued, the abandoning of the classical way of doing cinema and so the starting point of the French New Wave and the Modern Cinema can be found in the post-war Italian cinema and in the neorealism experiences. In particular,

this cinema seems to be constituted as a new subject of knowledge, which itself builds and develops. It produces a new world in which the main elements have not so many narrative functions as they have their own aesthetic value, related with the eye that is watching them and not with the action they are coming from.

Although Umberto D. is considered the end of the neorealist period, later films such as Federico Fellini's La Strada (1954) and De Sica's 1960 film Two Women (for which Sophia Loren won the Oscar for Best Actress) are grouped with the genre. Director Pier Paolo Pasolini's first film, Accattone (1961), shows a strong neorealist influence. The Neorealist period is often simply referred to as "The Golden Age" of Italian cinema by critics, filmmakers and scholars.

== Significant works ==
=== Precursors and influences ===
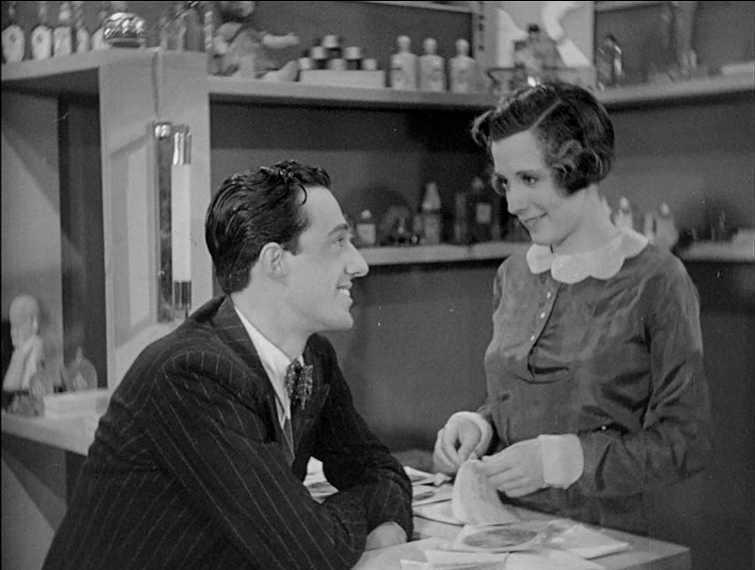
What Scoundrels Men Are! by Mario Camerini (1932)

The extent to which Italian neorealism was truly innovative continues to be debated among film historians. Despite its wide influence, some have argued that it was more a revival of earlier Italian creative works than a groundbreaking movement. Important forerunners of Italian neorealism include:

- The verismo literary movement, characterized by the works of Giovanni Verga and Luigi Capuana
- Poetic realism
- Lost in Darkness (Nino Martoglio, 1912)
- What Scoundrels Men Are! (Mario Camerini, 1932), the first Italian film shot entirely on location
- 1860 (Alessandro Blasetti, 1934)
- An Inn in Tokyo (Yasujirō Ozu, 1935)
- Toni (Jean Renoir, 1935)
- Men on the Sea Floor (Francesco De Robertis, 1941)
- The White Ship (Roberto Rossellini, 1941)
- Aniki-Bóbó (Manoel de Oliveira, 1942)
- People of the Mountains (István Szőts) 1942
- Four Steps in the Clouds (Alessandro Blasetti, 1942)
- Desire (Marcello Pagliero, 1946), was to begin production in 1943 under the name Scalo merci with Roberto Rossellini directing and Giuseppe De Santis writing, but production was halted by Allied bombing
- People of the Po Valley (Michelangelo Antonioni, 1947), filmed in 1943

=== Main works ===
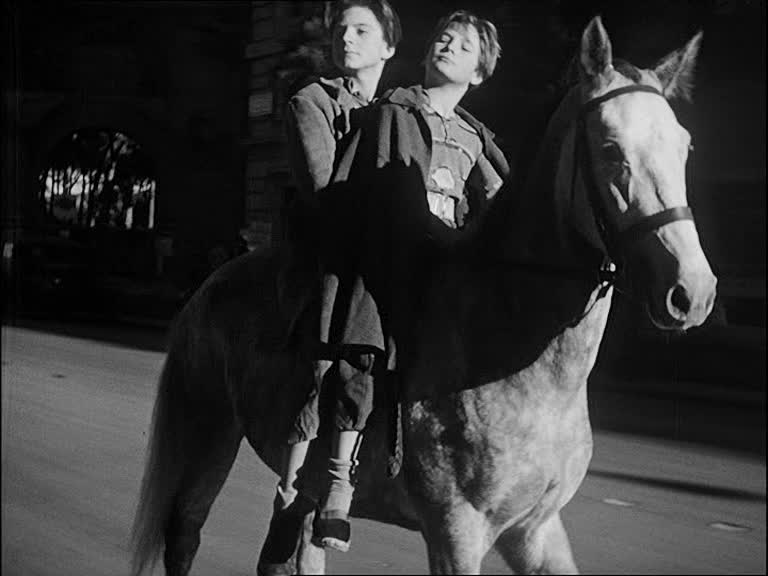
Shoeshine by Vittorio De Sica (1946)

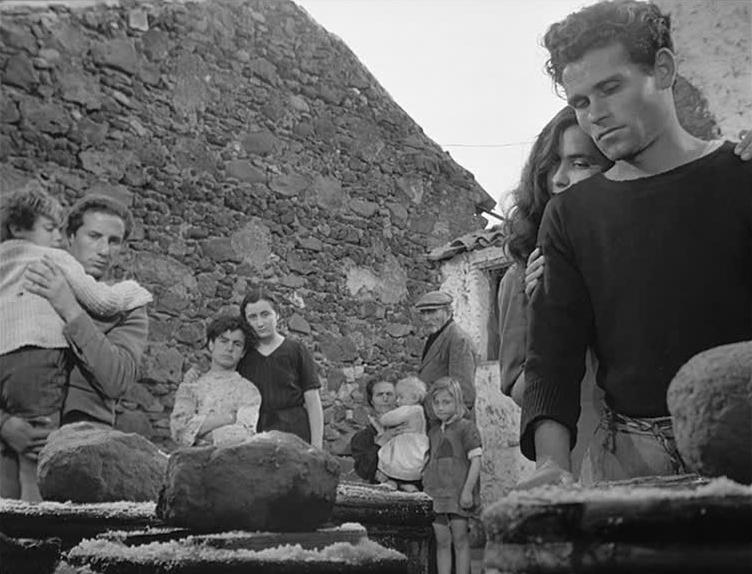
The Earth Trembles by Luchino Visconti (1948)

- Ossessione (Luchino Visconti, 1943)
- The Children Are Watching Us (Vittorio De Sica, 1943)
- Rome, Open City (Roberto Rossellini, 1945)
- Shoeshine (Vittorio De Sica, 1946)
- The Last Shoeshine (Gibba, 1946), the only animated example of neorealism
- O sole mio (Giacomo Gentilomo, 1946)
- Paisan (Roberto Rossellini, 1946)
- Germany, Year Zero (Roberto Rossellini, 1948)
- Bicycle Thieves (Vittorio De Sica, 1948)
- The Earth Trembles (Luchino Visconti, 1948)
- Bitter Rice (Giuseppe De Santis, 1949)
- Stromboli (Roberto Rossellini, 1950)
- Bellissima (Luchino Visconti, 1951)
- Miracle in Milan (Vittorio De Sica, 1951)
- Rome 11:00 (Giuseppe De Santis, 1952)
- Europe '51 (Roberto Rossellini, 1952)
- Umberto D. (Vittorio De Sica, 1952), filmed in 1951, but released in 1952. Many film historians date the end of the neorealist movement with the public attacks on the film.
- Journey to Italy (Roberto Rossellini, 1954)

== See also ==
- Kitchen sink realism - British New Wave
- Parallel cinema - Indian New Wave
- Japanese New Wave
- L.A. Rebellion
- My Voyage to Italy
