= The White Ship (1941 film) =

- Directed by: Roberto Rossellini
- Written by: Francesco De Robertis; Roberto Rossellini
- Produced by: Caesar Girosi
- Cinematography: Joseph Caracciolo
- Edited by: Eraldo Da Roma
- Music by: Renzo Rossellini
- Production company: Scalera Film
- Distributed by: Scalera Film
- Release date: 14 September 1941
- Running time: 77 minutes
- Country: Italy
- Language: Italian

The White Ship (Italian: La nave bianca) is a 1941 Italian war film directed by Roberto Rossellini. Its cast was made up entirely of amateur actors, many of them the real crew of a hospital ship of the Italian navy. The production was a work of propaganda intended to support the war aims of the Fascist Italian regime during the Second World War. It was made with the close co-operation of the Italian Navy, particularly Francesco De Robertis. Vittorio Mussolini, the son of the Italian dictator, was also a supporter of the project.

It was the first feature film directed by Rossellini, and commenced what has been described as his "Fascist Trilogy" which also includes A Pilot Returns (1942) and The Man with a Cross (1943). Along with a number of other films of the era, it is considered a precursor to Italian neorealism. Rossellini went on to be a leading Italian filmmaker, and a major figure in the development of neorealism.

The film was screened at the 1941 Venice Film Festival, before going on general release the following year. Because of this 1941 and 1942 are both often cited as its release date. It was awarded the Cup of the National Fascist Party at Venice.

== Synopsis ==
A young Italian sailor falls in love with a schoolteacher before returning to service on a warship. During the Battle of Cape Teulada against the Royal Navy, he is wounded and transferred to a hospital ship. There he is reunited with his lover, who is now working as a nurse.

== Bibliography ==
- Bondanella, Peter. The Films of Roberto Rossellini. Cambridge University Press, 1993.
