= List of Italian films of 1950 =

The following is a list of films produced in Italy during 1950 (see 1950 in film):

== A-B ==
Title	Director	Cast	Genre	Notes
1950
47 morto che parla	Carlo Ludovico Bragaglia	Totò, Silvana Pampanini, Adriana Benetti, Dante Maggio, Tina Lattanzi, Aldo Bufi Landi	Comedy	
Against the Law	Flavio Calzavara	Marcello Mastroianni, Fulvia Mammi, Renato Malavasi	Crime	
Alina	Giorgio Pastina	Gina Lollobrigida, Amedeo Nazzari, Doris Dowling, Juan de Landa	Drama	Written by Carlo Duse
L' Amore di Norma	Giuseppe de Martino	Lori Landi, Gino Mattera, Jacqueline Pierreux, Afro Poli	Musical drama	
Angelo tra la folla	Leonardo de Mitri	Angelo Maggio, Umberto Spadaro, Isa Pola, Luisella Beghi	Drama	
Barrier to the North	Luis Trenker	Amedeo Nazzari, Luis Trenker, Marianne Hold,	Adventure drama	
Beauty and the Devil	René Clair	Michel Simon, Gérard Philipe, Nicole Besnard, Simone Valère, Carlo Ninchi	Fantasy drama	Co-production with France. Nominated for BAFTA Film Award
Beauties on Bicycles	Carlo Campogalliani	Silvana Pampanini, Delia Scala, Franca Marzi, Peppino De Filippo, Renato Rascel	Comedy	
The Beggar's Daughter	Carlo Campogalliani	Paola Barbara, Steve Barclay, Renato Valente	Historical	
Behind Closed Shutters	Luigi Comencini	Massimo Girotti, Eleonora Rossi Drago	Crime	
The Transporter	Giorgio Simonelli	Peppino De Filippo, Lida Baarova	SF comedy	
Il Bivio	Fernando Cerchio	Charles Vanel, Saro Urzi	Crime drama	
Bluebeard's Six Wives	Carlo Ludovico Bragaglia	Toto, Isa Barzizza, Carlo Ninchi	Comedy	
The Bread Peddler	Maurice Cloche	Vivi Gioi, Philippe Lemaire	Historical	Co-production with France
Il Brigante Musolino	Mario Camerini	Amedeo Nazzari, Silvana Mangano, Umberto Spadaro	Crime drama	

== C-K ==
Title	Director	Cast	Genre	Notes
The Cadets of Gascony	Mario Mattoli	Walter Chiari, Carlo Campanini, Mario Riva	Comedy	
Capitan Demonio	Carlo Borghesio	Adriano Rimoldi, Maria Martin, Nerio Bernardi	Historical	
Cavalcade of Heroes	Mario Costa	Cesare Danova, Carla Del Poggio, Vittorio Sanipoli	Historical	
The Cliff of Sin	Roberto Bianchi Montero	Gino Cervi, Margarete Genske, Delia Scala	Melodrama	
The Count of Saint Elmo	Guido Brignone	Massimo Serato, Anna Maria Ferrero, Nelly Corradi	Historical	
The Devil in the Convent	Nunzio Malasomma	Gilberto Govi, Mariella Lotti, Carlo Ninchi	Comedy	
Devotion	Augusto Genina	Columba Dominguez, Roldano Lupi, Juan de Landa	Drama	
A Dog's Life	Mario Monicelli, Steno	Aldo Fabrizi, Gina Lollobrigida, Delia Scala	Comedy	
Due sorelle amano	Jacopo Comin	Jone Salinas, Eleonora Drago	Romance	
The Elusive Twelve	Mario Mattoli	Walter Chiari, Silvana Pampanini, Isa Barzizza	Comedy	
Faddija – La legge della vendetta	Roberto Bianchi Montero	Otello Toso, Luisa Rossi	Drama	
Figaro Here, Figaro There	Carlo Ludovico Bragaglia	Toto, Isa Barzizza, Renato Rascel	Comedy	
The Fighting Men	Camillo Mastrocinque	Rossano Brazzi, Charles Vanel, Claudine Dupuis	Drama	
The Flowers of St. Francis	Roberto Rossellini	Aldo Fabrizi, Thirteen Franciscan monks	Biopic	About Francis of Assisi
The Gay Swordsman	Riccardo Freda	Carlo Ninchi, Gianna Maria Canale, Franca Marzi	Adventure	
The Glass Castle	René Clément	Michèle Morgan, Jean Marais, Fosco Giachetti	Drama	Co-production with France
Hearts at Sea	Giorgio Bianchi	Doris Dowling, Jacques Sernas	Adventure	
Her Favourite Husband	Mario Soldati	Jean Kent, Robert Beatty, Gordon Harker	Comedy	Co-production with Britain
His Last Twelve Hours	Luigi Zampa	Jean Gabin, Mariella Lotti, Elli Parvo	Drama fantasy	Co-production with France
I'm in the Revue	Mario Soldati	Nino Taranto, Isa Barzizza, Fernandel	Comedy	Co-production with France
It's Forever Springtime	Renato Castellani	Elena Varzi, Irene Genna	Comedy drama	
The Knight Has Arrived!	Mario Monicelli, Steno	Tino Scotti, Silvana Pampanini, Nyta Dover	Comedy	

== L-P ==
Title	Director	Cast	Genre	Notes
The Last Days of Pompeii	Marcel L'Herbier, Paolo Moffa	Micheline Presle, Georges Marchal, Marcel Herrand	Historical	Co-production with France
The Lion of Amalfi	Pietro Francisci	Vittorio Gassman, Milly Vitale, Carlo Ninchi	Drama	
Love and Poison	Giorgio Simonelli	Amedeo Nazzari, Lois Maxwell, Marisa Merlini	Historical	
Margaret of Cortona	Mario Bonnard	Maria Frau, Isa Pola, Galeazzo Benti	Historical	
Mater dei	Emilio Cordero	Bianca Doria, Giulio Calì	Drama	
The Merry Widower	Mario Mattoli	Carlo Dapporto, Isa Barzizza, Amedeo Nazzari	Romance	
Miss Italia	Duilio Coletti	Gina Lollobrigida, Richard Ney, Constance Dowling	Comedy	
Il Mulatto	Francesco De Robertis	Renato Baldini	Drama	
Napoli milionaria	Eduardo De Filippo	Eduardo De Filippo, Leda Gloria	Comedy	
Nel Mezzogiorno qualcosa è cambiata				
Il nido di falasco	Guido Brignone	Umberto Spadaro, Liliana Tellini	Drama	
Night Taxi	Carmine Gallone	Beniamino Gigli, Danielle Godet, Philippe Lemaire	Comedy	Co-production with France
No Peace Under the Olive Tree	Giuseppe De Santis	Raf Vallone, Lucia Bosé, Folco Lulli	Italian neorealism	
Pact with the Devil	Luigi Chiarini	Isa Miranda, Eduardo Ciannelli	Drama	
La Palla ovale				
The Paris Waltz	Marcel Achard	Yvonne Printemps, Pierre Fresnay	Historical musical	Co-production with France
Passione fatale	Ernesto Grassi	Jone Paoli		
Path of Hope	Pietro Germi	Raf Vallone, Saro Urzì, Elena Varzi	Drama	Italian neorealism, entered at Cannes and Berlin.
Peppino e Violetta	Maurice Cloche	Nerio Bernardi		
Il Piccolo sceriffo				
Pittori allo specchio				
Prima comunione (Father's Dilemma)	Alessandro Blasetti	Aldo Fabrizi, Gaby Morlay	Comedy	3 Nastro d'Argento. Venice Award
Problemi sociali				
Pugilatori				

== Q-Z ==
Title	Director	Cast	Genre	Notes
Rapture	Goffredo Alessandrini	Glenn Langan, Elsie Albiin	Drama	
Red Seal	Flavio Calzavara	Gino Cervi, Carla Del Poggio, Adriano Rimoldi	Mystery	
Il Richiamo nella tempesta	Oreste Palella	Silvana Pampanini	Drama	produced by Ezio Lavoretti 1950
Romanticismo	Clemente Fracassi	Clara Calamai, Nyta Dover		
Romanzo d'amore	Duilio Coletti	Rossano Brazzi, Danielle Darrieux	Melodrama	
Sambo				
Il Sentiero dell'odio	Sergio Grieco	Marina Berti, Andrea Checchi	Drama	
The Sky Is Red	Claudio Gora	Marina Berti, Jacques Sernas, Mischa Auer	Drama	
Songs in the Streets	Mario Landi	Luciano Taioli, Antonella Lualdi, Carlo Ninchi	Musical	
Story of a Love Affair	Michelangelo Antonioni	Lucia Bosé, Massimo Girotti, Ferdinando Sarmi	Drama	Antonioni's film debut. 2 Nastro d'Argento
La Strada finisce sul fiume	Luigi Capuano	Constance Dowling, Andrea Checchi		
Strano appuntamento	Dezső Ákos Hamza	Umberto Spadaro, Leda Gloria		
Stromboli	Roberto Rossellini	Ingrid Bergman, Mario Vitale	Drama	Co-production with the United States
Sunday in August	Luciano Emmer	Franco Interlenghi, Massimo Serato, Marcello Mastroianni	Comedy drama	Pink neorealism
La Taverna della libertà	Maurice Cam	Umberto Spadaro		
Night Taxi	Carmine Gallone	Beniamino Gigli, Danielle Godet	Comedy	Co-production with France
Terra senza tempo	Silvetro Prestfilippo	Leonardo Cortese		
That Ghost of My Husband	Camillo Mastrocinque	Walter Chiari, Enzo Biliotti, Jole Fierro	Comedy	
The Thief of Venice	John Brahm	Maria Montez, Massimo Serato, Faye Marlowe	Adventure	Co-production with the United States
Tomorrow Is Too Late	Léonide Moguy	Vittorio De Sica, Pier Angeli, Lois Maxwell	Pink neorealism	There's a sequel. Nastro d'Argento Best actress (Pier Angeli)
Toto Looks for a Wife	Carlo Ludovico Bragaglia	Toto, Ave Ninchi, Marisa Merlini	Comedy	
Toto the Sheik	Mario Mattoli	Toto, Tamara Lees, Laura Gore	Comedy	
Totò Tarzan	Mario Mattoli	Toto, Marilyn Buferd, Alba Arnova	Comedy	
The Transporter	Giorgio Simonelli	Peppino De Filippo, Silvana Pampanini, Lida Baarova	SF comedy	
Turri il bandito	Enzo Trapani	Nino Crisman, Lilia Landi	Crime drama	
The Two Sisters	Mario Volpe	Vera Carmi, Enzo Fiermonte, Checco Durante	Drama	
La Valle dell'odio	Adriano Zancanella	Antonio Strobi	Drama	
Variety Lights	Federico Fellini, Alberto Lattuada	Peppino De Filippo, Giulietta Masina, Carla Del Poggio, Franca Valeri, John Kitzmiller	Drama	Fellini's debut
Vendetta di zingara	Aldo Molinari	Sergio Raimondi		
Volcano	William Dieterle	Anna Magnani, Rossano Brazzi, Geraldine Brooks	Drama	Co-production with the United States
The Vow	Mario Bonnard	Doris Duranti, Giorgio De Lullo, Maria Grazia Francia	Drama	
Welcome, Reverend!	Aldo Fabrizi	Aldo Fabrizi, Lianella Carell, Massimo Girotti	Crime comedy	
The White Line	Luigi Zampa	Raf Vallone, Gina Lollobrigida, Erno Crisa	Drama	
Women and Brigands	Mario Soldati	Amedeo Nazzari, Maria Mauban, Jean Chevrier	Historical	Co-production with France
Women Without Names	Géza von Radványi	Simone Simon, Vivi Gioi, Irasema Dilian	Drama	
Lo Zappatore	Rate Furlan	Angelo Dessy		

== Documentaries ==
Title	Director	Cast	Genre	Notes
Finestre	Francesco Maselli		Documentary	
La Funivia del faloria	Michelangelo Antonioni		Documentary	
Ippodromi all'alba	Alessandro Blasetti		Documentary	
L' Isola bianca	Dino Risi		Documentary	
Modena, città dell'Emilia Rossa	Carlo Lizzani		Documentary	
L' Ospedale del delitto	Luigi Comencini		Documentary	
La Villa dei mostri	Michelangelo Antonioni	Gerardo Guerrieri	Documentary	
