= 1950 in film =

The year 1950 in film involved some significant events.

== Top-grossing films (U.S.) ==
The top ten 1950 released films by box office gross in North America are as follows:

Highest-grossing films of 1950
Rank	Title	Distributor	Domestic rentals
1	Samson and Delilah	Paramount	$9,000,000
2	King Solomon's Mines	MGM	$5,047,000
3	Annie Get Your Gun	MGM	$4,708,000
4	Cheaper by the Dozen	20th Century Fox	$4,425,000
5	Cinderella	RKO/Walt Disney	$4,275,000
6	Born Yesterday	Columbia	$4,100,000
7	Father of the Bride	MGM	$4,036,000
8	Broken Arrow	20th Century Fox	$3,600,000
9	All About Eve	20th Century Fox	$3,100,000
10	Three Little Words	MGM	$3,019,000

== Events ==
- January 13 – Three weeks after its world premiere at the Paramount and Rivoli theatres in New York City, Cecil B. DeMille's Samson and Delilah opens in Los Angeles. The film is a massive commercial success and wins the awards for Best Art Direction and Best Costume Design at the 23rd Academy Awards.
- February 15 – Walt Disney Studios' animated film Cinderella debuts. The film is the most successful the studio has made since Dumbo, and saves the studio from four million dollars in debt.
- July 19 – Walt Disney Studios' first completely live-action film Treasure Island debuts.

== Awards ==
Category/Organization	8th Golden Globe Awards February 28, 1951		23rd Academy Awards March 29, 1951
Category/Organization	Drama	Comedy or Musical	23rd Academy Awards March 29, 1951
Best Film	Sunset Boulevard		All About Eve
Best Director	Billy Wilder; Sunset Boulevard		Joseph L. Mankiewicz; All About Eve
Best Actor	José Ferrer; Cyrano de Bergerac	Fred Astaire; Three Little Words	José Ferrer; Cyrano de Bergerac
Best Actress	Gloria Swanson; Sunset Boulevard	Judy Holliday; Born Yesterday	
Best Supporting Actor	Edmund Gwenn; Mister 880		George Sanders; All About Eve
Best Supporting Actress	Josephine Hull; Harvey		
Best Screenplay, Adapted	Joseph L. Mankiewicz; All About Eve		Joseph L. Mankiewicz; All About Eve
Best Screenplay, Original	Joseph L. Mankiewicz; All About Eve		Charles Brackett, Billy Wilder and D. M. Marshman Jr. Sunset Boulevard

== Top ten money making stars ==
Rank	Actor/Actress
1.	John Wayne
2.	Bob Hope
3.	Bing Crosby
4.	Betty Grable
5.	James Stewart
6. (tie)	Bud Abbott; Lou Costello
7.	Clifton Webb
8.	Esther Williams
9.	Spencer Tracy
10.	Randolph Scott

== Notable films released in 1950 ==
US unless stated

=== # ===
- 47 morto che parla, starring Totò – (Italy)
- 711 Ocean Drive, starring Edmond O'Brien and Joanne Dru

=== A ===
- Abbott and Costello in the Foreign Legion, starring Bud Abbott and Lou Costello
- The Admiral Was a Lady, starring Wanda Hendrix and Edmond O'Brien
- All About Eve, directed by Joseph L. Mankiewicz, starring Bette Davis, Anne Baxter, George Sanders, Celeste Holm, Hugh Marlowe, Marilyn Monroe – winner of 6 Oscars
- Ambush, starring Robert Taylor and Arlene Dahl
- Annie Get Your Gun, starring Betty Hutton, Howard Keel, Louis Calhern
- Armored Car Robbery, starring Charles McGraw and William Talman
- The Asphalt Jungle, directed by John Huston, starring Sterling Hayden, Louis Calhern, Sam Jaffe, James Whitmore, Jean Hagen and Marilyn Monroe
- The Astonished Heart, starring Celia Johnson and Noël Coward – (GB)
- At War with the Army, starring Dean Martin and Jerry Lewis

=== B ===
- Babul (Father's House), starring Dilip Kumar and Nargis – (India)
- Backfire, starring Virginia Mayo and Gordon MacRae
- The Bandit Queen, starring Barbara Britton and Phillip Reed
- The Baron of Arizona, starring Vincent Price
- Beauty and the Devil (La Beauté du diable), directed by René Clair, starring Michel Simon – (France/Italy)
- Beqasoor, starring Madhubala – (India)
- The Big Lift, starring Montgomery Clift and Paul Douglas
- Bitter Springs, starring Tommy Trinder and Chips Rafferty – (Australia/GB)
- The Black Forest Girl, starring Sonja Ziemann and Rudolf Prack – (West Germany)
- The Black Rose, starring Tyrone Power and Orson Welles – (GB/US)
- The Blue Lamp, starring Jack Warner and Dirk Bogarde – (GB)
- Born to Be Bad, starring Joan Fontaine and Robert Ryan
- Born Yesterday, directed by George Cukor, starring Broderick Crawford, Judy Holliday and William Holden
- The Breaking Point, directed by Michael Curtiz, starring John Garfield and Patricia Neal
- Bright Leaf, starring Gary Cooper, Lauren Bacall and Patricia Neal
- Broken Arrow, starring James Stewart and Jeff Chandler

=== C ===
- Café Paradis – (Denmark)
- Caged, starring Eleanor Parker
- Caiçara, directed by and starring Adolfo Celi – (Brazil)
- Captain Carey, U.S.A., starring Alan Ladd and Wanda Hendrix
- Captain China, starring John Payne and Gail Russell
- Champagne for Caesar, starring Ronald Colman, Celeste Holm, Vincent Price, Art Linkletter
- Cheaper by the Dozen, starring Clifton Webb and Myrna Loy
- Cinderella, a Disney animated film. Directed by Clyde Geronimi, Hamilton Luske, and Wilfred Jackson, starring Ilene Woods, Eleanor Audley, Verna Felton, Rhoda Williams, James MacDonald, Luis van Rooten, Don Barclay, Mike Douglas, and Lucille Bliss
- Comanche Territory, starring Maureen O'Hara
- Convicted, starring Glenn Ford and Broderick Crawford
- Crisis, starring Cary Grant and Jose Ferrer
- Cyrano de Bergerac, starring José Ferrer

=== D ===
- D.O.A., starring Edmond O'Brien
- Dallas, starring Gary Cooper
- The Damned Don't Cry, starring Joan Crawford
- Dance Hall, directed by Charles Crichton, starring Diana Dors and Petula Clark – (GB)
- Darah dan Doa, directed and produced by Usmar Ismail – (Indonesia), first native-produced Indonesian film
- Dark City, directed by William Dieterle, starring Charlton Heston (in his first studio film), Lizabeth Scott, Viveca Lindfors, Dean Jagger, Mike Mazurki, Ed Begley
- The Daughter of Rosie O'Grady, starring June Haver and Gordon MacRae
- Death is a Caress (Døden er et kjærtegn) – (Norway)
- Deported, starring Jeff Chandler
- Destination Moon, starring John Archer
- The Devil Is a Woman (Doña Diabla) – (Mexico)
- Devil's Doorway, starring Robert Taylor, Louis Calhern, Paula Raymond
- Dial 1119, starring Marshall Thompson, Virginia Field, William Conrad
- Dieu a besoin des hommes (God Needs Man), directed by Jean Delannoy – (France)

=== E ===
- The Eagle and the Hawk, starring Rhonda Fleming and John Payne
- Edge of Doom, starring Farley Granger and Mala Powers
- Les Enfants Terribles, directed by Jean-Pierre Melville – (France)
- La escalinata, directed by César Enríquez – (Venezuela)
- Escape at Dawn (Akatsuki no dasso) – (Japan)

=== F ===
- The Fall of Berlin (Padeniye Berlina) – (USSR)
- Fancy Pants, starring Bob Hope and Lucille Ball
- Father Is a Bachelor, starring William Holden and Colleen Gray
- Father of the Bride, directed by Vincente Minnelli, starring Spencer Tracy, Joan Bennett and Elizabeth Taylor
- The File on Thelma Jordon, starring Barbara Stanwyck
- The Fireball, starring Mickey Rooney and Pat O'Brien
- The Flame and the Arrow, starring Burt Lancaster and Virginia Mayo
- The Flowers of St. Francis (Francesco, giullare di Dio), directed by Roberto Rossellini – (Italy)
- For Heaven's Sake, starring Clifton Webb and Joan Bennett
- Frenchie, starring Joel McCrea and Shelley Winters
- The Fuller Brush Girl, starring Lucille Ball and Eddie Albert
- The Furies, directed by Anthony Mann, starring Barbara Stanwyck and Walter Huston

=== G ===
- Gabriela, directed by Géza von Cziffra, starring Zarah Leander – (West Germany)
- Gerald McBoing-Boing
- The Glass Menagerie, based on the play by Tennessee Williams, starring Jane Wyman, Kirk Douglas, Gertrude Lawrence and Arthur Kennedy
- Gone to Earth, starring Jennifer Jones – (GB)
- Guilty of Treason, starring Charles Bickford and Bonita Granville
- Gun Crazy (aka Deadly is the Female), starring John Dall and Peggy Cummins
- The Gunfighter, starring Gregory Peck
- Gunman in the Streets, starring Simone Signoret – (France)

=== H ===
- The Happiest Days of Your Life, starring Alastair Sim and Margaret Rutherford – (GB)
- Harriet Craig, starring Joan Crawford and Wendell Corey
- Harvey, starring James Stewart and Josephine Hull
- Highly Dangerous, starring Margaret Lockwood and Dane Clark – (GB)
- Highway 301, starring Steve Cochran and Virginia Grey
- The Hollywood Ten, documentary by John Berry
- House by the River, starring Louis Hayward and Jane Wyatt
- Hunt the Man Down, starring Gig Young and Carla Balenda

=== I ===
- The Iroquois Trail, starring George Montgomery
- I Was a Shoplifter, starring Scott Brady and Mona Freeman
- I'll Get By, starring June Haver, Gloria DeHaven, Steve Allen, Dennis Day
- In a Lonely Place, directed by Nicholas Ray, starring Humphrey Bogart and Gloria Grahame

=== J ===
- The Jackie Robinson Story, starring Robinson as himself, with Ruby Dee
- Jogan, starring Dilip Kumar and Nargis – (India)
- Johnny One-Eye, starring Pat O'Brien
- Julius Caesar, starring Charlton Heston
- Justice is Done (Justice est faite) – (France)

=== K ===
- Key to the City, starring Clark Gable and Loretta Young
- The Kid (Xi lu xiang), starring 10-year-old Bruce Lee – (Hong Kong)
- Kill the Umpire, starring William Bendix, William Frawley, Una Merkel
- The Killer That Stalked New York, starring Evelyn Keyes
- Kim, starring Errol Flynn
- King Solomon's Mines, starring Deborah Kerr and Stewart Granger
- Kiss Tomorrow Goodbye, starring James Cagney

=== L ===
- A Lady Without Passport, starring Hedy Lamarr and John Hodiak
- Last Holiday, starring Alec Guinness – (GB)
- The Lawless, directed by Joseph Losey, starring Macdonald Carey
- Let's Dance, starring Fred Astaire and Betty Hutton
- Life (Jeevitham), directed by A. V. Meiyappan, starring Vyjayanthimala in her Telugu film debut – (India)
- A Life of Her Own, starring Lana Turner and Ray Milland
- The Life of Wu Xun (Wu Xun zhuan) – (China)
- Louisa, starring Ronald Reagan
- Love Happy, starring the Marx Brothers and, in a small role, Marilyn Monroe

=== M ===
- The Magnificent Yankee, starring Louis Calhern
- The Man Who Cheated Himself, starring Lee J. Cobb and Jane Wyatt
- The Men, starring Marlon Brando in his film debut, with Teresa Wright, Everett Sloane, Jack Webb and, in a bit part, DeForest Kelley
- The Miniver Story, starring Greer Garson, Walter Pidgeon and John Hodiak
- Mirror of Holland (Spiegel van Holland) – (Netherlands) winner of Short Film Palme d'Or
- Mister 880, starring Burt Lancaster and Edmund Gwenn
- Montana, starring Errol Flynn and Alexis Smith
- Morning Departure (aka Operation Disaster), starring John Mills and Richard Attenborough – (GB)
- Mrs. O'Malley and Mr. Malone, starring Marjorie Main and James Whitmore
- The Mudlark, starring Irene Dunne and Alec Guinness – (GB/US)
- Mussorgsky – (USSR)
- My Blue Heaven, starring Betty Grable
- My Friend Irma Goes West, starring Dean Martin and Jerry Lewis
- Mystery Street, starring Ricardo Montalbán

=== N ===
- Nacha Regules, directed by Luis César Amadori (Argentina)
- Nancy Goes to Rio, starring Ann Sothern, Jane Powell, Barry Sullivan, Carmen Miranda, Louis Calhern, and Scotty Beckett
- The Nevadan, starring Randolph Scott and Dorothy Malone
- Night and the City, directed by Jules Dassin, starring Richard Widmark and Gene Tierney – (GB)
- No Man of Her Own, starring Barbara Stanwyck
- No Peace Under the Olive Tree (Non c'è pace tra gli ulivi), starring Raf Vallone – (Italy)
- No Way Out, starring Richard Widmark, Linda Darnell, Stephen McNally and Sidney Poitier

=== O ===
- Odette, starring Anna Neagle and Trevor Howard – (GB)
- Los Olvidados, directed by Luis Buñuel – photograph of Gabriel Figueroa – (Mexico)
- Once a Thief, starring Cesar Romero and Lon Chaney Jr.
- One Way Street, starring James Mason
- Orphée, directed by Jean Cocteau, starring Jean Marais – (France)
- Outrage, directed by Ida Lupino, starring Mala Powers
- Outside the Wall, starring Richard Basehart and Marilyn Maxwell

=== P ===
- Panic in the Streets, directed by Elia Kazan, starring Richard Widmark, Jack Palance, Zero Mostel and Barbara Bel Geddes
- Path of Hope (Il Cammino della speranza), directed by Pietro Germi, starring Raf Vallone – (Italy)
- Perfect Strangers, starring Ginger Rogers
- Please Believe Me, starring Deborah Kerr, Peter Lawford and Robert Walker
- Post Office Box 1001 (Apartado de correos 1001) – (Spain)
- Prehistoric Women, directed by Gregg C. Tallas
- Prima comunione (aka Father's Dilemma), starring Aldo Fabrizi – (Italy)

=== Q ===
- Quicksand, starring Mickey Rooney and Peter Lorre

=== R ===
- Rashomon, directed by Akira Kurosawa, starring Toshiro Mifune and Masayuki Mori – (Japan)
- Riding High, directed by Frank Capra, starring Bing Crosby
- Right Cross, starring June Allyson and Dick Powell
- Rio Grande, directed by John Ford, starring John Wayne and Maureen O'Hara
- Rocketship X-M, starring Lloyd Bridges, Hugh O'Brian and Noah Beery Jr.
- Rocky Mountain, starring Errol Flynn and Patrice Wymore
- Rogues of Sherwood Forest, starring John Derek
- La Ronde (The Merry-Go-Round), directed by Max Ophüls, starring Simone Signoret and Anton Walbrook – (France)
- Room to Let, directed by Godfrey Grayson

=== S ===
- Scandal (Sukyandaru), directed by Akira Kurosawa – (Japan)
- The Second Face, starring Ella Raines
- The Secret Fury, starring Claudette Colbert and Robert Ryan
- September Affair, starring Joan Fontaine and Joseph Cotten
- Seven Days to Noon, directed by the Boulting Brothers, starring Barry Jones – (GB)
- Shadow on the Wall, starring Ann Sothern, Zachary Scott, Nancy Davis
- Side Street, starring Farley Granger and Cathy O'Donnell
- Sierra, starring Wanda Hendrix and Audie Murphy
- The Sleeping City, starring Richard Conte
- So Long at the Fair, starring Jean Simmons and Dirk Bogarde – (GB)
- The Sound of Fury, starring Frank Lovejoy and Lloyd Bridges
- Stage Fright, directed by Alfred Hitchcock, starring Jane Wyman, Marlene Dietrich, Michael Wilding and Richard Todd – (GB)
- Stars in My Crown, starring Joel McCrea
- State Secret, starring Douglas Fairbanks Jr. and Jack Hawkins – (GB)
- Story of a Love Affair (Cronaca di un amore), directed by Michelangelo Antonioni – (Italy)
- Stromboli, directed by Roberto Rossellini, starring Ingrid Bergman – (Italy/US)
- Summer Stock, starring Judy Garland and Gene Kelly, with Phil Silvers
- Sunday in August (Domenica d'agosto) – (Italy)
- Sunset Boulevard, directed by Billy Wilder, starring William Holden, Gloria Swanson, Erich Von Stroheim, Nancy Olson

=== T ===
- También de Dolor se Canta (They Also Sing from Sadness), starring Pedro Infante – (Mexico)
- Tea for Two, starring Doris Day and Gordon MacRae
- Tension, starring Richard Basehart and Audrey Totter
- This Life of Mine (Wo zhe yi bei zi) – (China)
- Three Came Home, starring Claudette Colbert
- Three Little Words, starring Fred Astaire and Red Skelton
- Three Secrets, starring Eleanor Parker, Patricia Neal, Ruth Roman
- A Ticket to Tomahawk, starring Anne Baxter and Dan Dailey
- The Titan: Story of Michelangelo, award-winning documentary by Robert J. Flaherty
- To Joy (Till glädje), directed by Ingmar Bergman – (Sweden)
- To Please a Lady, starring Clark Gable and Barbara Stanwyck
- The Toast of New Orleans, starring Kathryn Grayson and Mario Lanza
- Tomorrow Is Too Late (Domani è troppo tardi), starring Pier Angeli and Vittorio De Sica – (Italy)
- The Trap (Past), directed by Martin Frič – (Czechoslovakia)
- Treasure Island, starring Robert Newton – (GB/US)
- Trio, starring Nigel Patrick, Wilfred Hyde-White, Jean Simmons – (GB)
- Tripoli, starring Maureen O'Hara and John Payne
- Two Flags West, starring Joseph Cotten and Linda Darnell
- Two Weeks with Love, starring Jane Powell and Ricardo Montalbán

=== U ===
- El último caballo (The Last Horse) – (Spain)
- The Underworld Story, starring Dan Duryea
- Union Station, starring William Holden
- Until We Meet Again (Mata au hi made) – (Japan)

=== V ===
- Variety Lights (Luci del varietà), directed by Federico Fellini – (Italy)
- Vendetta, starring Faith Domergue (filmed in 1946 but not released until 1950 due to delays from Howard Hughes)
- Virtue for Sale, directed by Mahmoud Zulfikar, starring Mahmoud Zulfikar, Faten Hamama – (Egypt)

=== W ===
- Wabash Avenue, starring Betty Grable (a remake of Grable's 1943 film Coney Island)
- Wagon Master, directed by John Ford, starring Ben Johnson, Joanne Dru and Ward Bond
- Watch the Birdie, starring Red Skelton, Arlene Dahl and Ann Miller
- The West Point Story, starring James Cagney and Doris Day
- When Willie Comes Marching Home, starring Dan Dailey
- Where Danger Lives, starring Robert Mitchum and Faith Domergue in her film debut
- Where the Sidewalk Ends, directed by Otto Preminger, starring Dana Andrews and Gene Tierney
- Winchester '73, starring James Stewart, Shelley Winters, Stephen McNally, Dan Duryea, and with early appearances by Rock Hudson and Tony Curtis
- The Woman in Question, directed by Anthony Asquith, starring Jean Kent and Dirk Bogarde – (GB)
- Woman in Hiding, starring Ida Lupino, Howard Duff and Stephen McNally
- Woman on the Run, starring Ann Sheridan and Dennis O'Keefe
- The Wooden Horse, starring Leo Genn and Anthony Steel – (GB)

=== Y ===
- The Yellow Cab Man, starring Red Skelton and Gloria DeHaven
- The Young and the Damned (Los Olvidados), directed by Luis Buñuel – (Mexico)
- Young Man with a Horn, directed by Michael Curtiz, starring Kirk Douglas, Lauren Bacall, Doris Day

=== Z ===
- Zhukovsky – (USSR)

== Serials ==
- Atom Man vs. Superman, starring Kirk Alyn, Noel Neill and Lyle Talbot
- Cody of the Pony Express
- Desperadoes of the West, starring Tom Keene
- Flying Disc Man from Mars, starring Walter Reed and Lois Collier
- The Invisible Monster, starring Richard Webb and Aline Towne
- The Mystery of the Snakeskin Belt
- Pirates of the High Seas, starring Buster Crabbe

== Short film series ==
- Mickey Mouse (1928–1953)
- Looney Tunes (1930–1969)
- Merrie Melodies (1931–1969)
- Popeye (1933–1957)
- The Three Stooges (1934–1959)
- Donald Duck (1936–1956)
- Pluto (1937–1951)
- Goofy (1939–1953)
- Tom and Jerry (1940–1958)
- Bugs Bunny (1940–1964)
- The Fox and the Crow (1941–1950)
- Mighty Mouse (1942–1955)
- Chip and Dale (1943–1956)
- Yosemite Sam (1945–1963)
- Noveltoons (1943–1967)

== Births ==
- January 1 – Gerard McSorley, Irish actor
- January 6 - Richard Norton, Australian martial artist, actor, stunt performer and fight choreographer (d. 2025)
- January 7 – Erin Gray, American model and actress
- January 9 - David Johansen, American singer-songwriter and actor (d. 2025)
- January 16 - Debbie Allen, American actress, singer, director and producer
- January 23 – Richard Dean Anderson, American actor
- January 24 – Daniel Auteuil, French actor
- January 25 - John Terry, retired American actor
- January 27 - Alex Norton, Scottish actor
- January 30
  - Randy Brooks, American actor
  - Trinidad Silva, American comedian and character actor (d. 1988)
- January 31 - Robert Grubb, Australian actor
- February 2 - Barbara Sukowa, German actress
- February 3 - Morgan Fairchild, American actress
- February 4 - Linda Bassett, English actress
- February 5 – Jonathan Freeman, American actor, voice actor, singer and puppeteer
- February 12 – Michael Ironside, Canadian actor
- February 13 - Scott Paulin, American actor and director
- February 14 - Frank Collison, American actor
- February 16 - R. D. Call, American actor (d. 2020)
- February 17 – Prunella Gee, English actress
- February 18
  - John Hughes, American director, producer and screenwriter (d. 2009)
  - Cybill Shepherd, American actress
- February 19 - Johan Leysen, Belgian actor (d. 2023)
- February 21 – Larry Drake, American actor and comedian (d. 2016)
- February 22 – Julie Walters, English actress
- February 23 – Mary Pat Gleason, American actress (d. 2020)
- February 25 – Neil Jordan, Irish director
- February 26 - Don Shanks, American actor and stuntman
- March 2 – Matthew Laurance, American actor and comedian
- March 3 – Laura Ziskin, American producer (d. 2011)
- March 11 – Jerry Zucker, American director and producer
- March 13 – William H. Macy, American actor
- March 16 - Kate Nelligan, Canadian actress
- March 18 – Brad Dourif, American actor
- March 20
  - William Hurt, American actor (d. 2022)
  - Tom Towles, American character actor (d. 2015)
- March 23 – Corinne Cléry, French actress
- March 26
  - Martin Short, Canadian comedian and actor
  - Alan Silvestri, American film composer and conductor
- March 29 – Barry Pearl, American actor
- March 30 – Robbie Coltrane, Scottish actor (d. 2022)
- April 2 - Allan Corduner, British actor
- April 4 – Christine Lahti, American actress
- April 8 - Carmen Twillie, American actress and singer
- April 11 - Bill Irwin, American actor, clown and comedian
- April 12 – David Cassidy, American actor and singer-songwriter (d. 2017)
- April 13
  - Ron Perlman, American actor
  - William Sadler, American actor
- April 14 - Lynda Obst, American producer (d. 2024)
- April 15
  - Josiane Balasko, French actress, writer and director
  - Amy Wright, American actress
- April 16 – David Graf, American actor (d. 2001)
- April 18
  - Philip Akin, Canadian actor
  - Kenny Ortega, American filmmaker
- April 22
  - Thierry Zéno, Belgian director (d. 2017)
  - Lee Tamahori, New Zealand director (d. 2025)
- April 23 - Henry Goodman, British actor
- April 25 - Peter Jurasik, American actor
- April 28
  - Rod Culbertson, English actor
  - Jay Leno, American comedian, actor, writer, producer and late-night television host
- April 29 – Phillip Noyce, Australian director
- May 1 – John Diehl, American character actor
- May 3 - Peter Guinness, English actor
- May 7 - Randall "Tex" Cobb, American actor and martial artist
- May 8
  - Mark Blankfield, American actor and comedian (d. 2024)
  - Robert Mugge, American director and producer
- May 9 – Marcheline Bertrand, American actress (d. 2007)
- May 10 - Joseph Ruben, American director
- May 12
  - Bruce Boxleitner, American actor, science fiction and suspense writer
  - Gabriel Byrne, Irish actor
- May 13 – Joe Johnston, American director, writer and visual effects artist
- May 14
  - John Dennis Johnston, American actor
  - Mark Blum, American actor (d. 2020)
- May 15 – Nicholas Hammond, American-born Australian actor and writer
- May 18
  - Gerry Mendicino, Canadian actor
  - Nick Wyman, American actor
- May 22 – Peter Wildman, Canadian actor
- May 23 - O-Lan Jones, American actress
- May 30 - Jo Ann Havrilla, American actress
- June 1 – John M. Jackson, American film and television actor
- June 2 - Joanna Gleason, Canadian-American actress and singer
- June 3 - Melissa Mathison, American screenwriter (d. 2015)
- June 5 – Daniel von Bargen, American character actor (d. 2015)
- June 6 – Chantal Akerman, Belgian-born director (d. 2015)
- June 8
  - Kathy Baker, American actress
  - Sônia Braga, Brazilian actress
- June 13 – Belinda Bauer, Australian actress
- June 14 - Jeremy Sinden, English actor (d. 1996)
- June 17 – Lee Tamahori, New Zealand filmmaker (d. 2025)
- June 19 – Daria Nicolodi, Italian actress and screenwriter (d. 2020)
- June 21 - Enn Reitel, Scottish actor
- June 22
  - Tom Alter, Indian actor (d. 2017)
  - Sharon Maughan, British actress
- June 24 – Nancy Allen, American actress
- June 25 – Thomas Jefferson Byrd, American actor (d. 2020)
- June 26 – Michael Paul Chan, American actor
- June 28 - Sandy Gore, Australian actress
- July 1 - Ben Roberts, Welsh actor (d. 2021)
- July 5 - Linda Hart, American actress and musician
- July 6 - Geraldine James, English actress
- July 11 – Bruce McGill, American actor
- July 17 – Barbara Rosenblat, British actress
- July 19 - Richard Cordery, British actor
- July 20 – Tantoo Cardinal, Canadian actress
- July 21 - Jordan Clarke, American actor
- July 23 - Belinda Montgomery, Canadian-American actress
- July 24 - Johnny Lee Davenport, American actor (d. 2020)
- July 27
  - Simon Jones, English actor
  - Nigel Plaskitt, English actor and producer
- July 28 - Lani Minella, American voice actress, voice director and producer
- July 29 – Mike Starr, American character actor
- July 30 - Frank Stallone, American actor and musician
- August 2 - Kathryn Harrold, American retired actress
- August 3 - John Landis, American filmmaker and actor
- August 5 – Holly Palance, American actress
- August 6 – Dorian Harewood, American actor
- August 10 - Rémy Girard, Canadian actor
- August 11
  - Elya Baskin, Latvian-American character actor
  - Adam LeFevre, American character actor
- August 12 – Jim Beaver, American actor
- August 13 – Jane Carr, English actress
- August 14 – Peter Guinness, English actor
- August 15 - Tess Harper, American actress
- August 16 - Marshall Manesh, Iranian-American actor
- August 20 – Skip O'Brien, American actor (d. 2011)
- August 27 – Charles Fleischer, American stand-up comedian, actor, writer and musician
- September 2 - Rosanna DeSoto, American actress
- September 7 – Julie Kavner, American film and television actress, voice actress and comedian
- September 9 - Joe Lisi, American actor
- September 11 – Amy Madigan, American actress
- September 12 – Bruce Mahler, American actor, producer and writer
- September 14 – Howard Deutch, American director
- September 15 - Hrant Alianak, Sudanese-Armenian-Canadian actor
- September 18
  - Luis Contreras, American character actor (d. 2004)
  - Anna Deavere Smith, American actress
- September 19 - Rudy Ramos, American actor and musician
- September 21 – Bill Murray, American actor and comedian
- September 24
  - Harriet Walter, British actress
  - Kristina Wayborn, Swedish actress
- September 25 - Cynthia Wood, American actress and model
- September 27 - Cary-Hiroyuki Tagawa, Japanese-born American actor, producer and martial artist (d. 2025)
- September 28 – John Sayles, American director and screenwriter
- September 29 - Miguel Couturier, Mexican actor (d. 2012)
- September 30 – Vondie Curtis-Hall, American actor, screenwriter and director
- October 1 – Randy Quaid, American actor
- October 2 – Ian McNeice, English actor
- October 4 – Alan Rosenberg, American actor
- October 5 – Jeff Conaway, American actor and singer (d. 2011)
- October 10 - Jerry Tondo, Japanese-American actor
- October 14 – Joey Travolta, American actor
- October 17 – Howard Rollins, American actor (d. 1996)
- October 18 – Om Puri, Indian actor (d. 2017)
- October 20 - William Russ, American actor and television director
- October 25 - Mark L. Taylor, American actor
- October 28 - Audrie J. Neenan, American actress
- October 31
  - John Candy, Canadian actor and comedian (d. 1994)
  - Frank Silva, American actor and set dresser (d. 1995)
- November 4 - Markie Post, American actress (d. 2021)
- November 7 - Lindsay Duncan, Scottish actress
- November 9 - Henry Yuk, American actor
- November 12 - Kevin Rooney, American stand-up comedian, writer and actor (d. 2022)
- November 13 – Jules Sylvester, British wild animal trainer, actor and television presenter
- November 16 – David Leisure, American actor
- November 18
  - Dennis Haskins, American actor (d. 2026)
  - Eric Pierpoint, American actor
- November 20 - Kenneth MacDonald, British actor (d. 2001)
- November 28 – Ed Harris, American actor
- December 2 - Dennis Christopher, American actor
- December 4 – Obba Babatundé, American actor
- December 8 - Rick Baker, American retired special make-up effects creator and actor
- December 10 – Gregg Berger, American voice actor
- December 12
  - Duane Chase, American actor
  - Rajinikanth, Indian actor
- December 13
  - Lindsey Ginter, American actor (d. 2024)
  - Darrell Larson, American actor
  - Wendie Malick, American-Canadian actress
  - Afemo Omilami, American actor
- December 16 - Peter Van Norden, American actor (d. 2026)
- December 18
  - Gillian Armstrong, Australian director
  - Su Elliot, British actress
- December 21
  - Jane How, English actress
  - Jeffrey Katzenberg, American filmmaker and animator
- December 22
  - Franc Luz, American actor
  - Jeris Lee Poindexter, American actor, comedian and musician
- December 29 - Jon Polito, American character actor (d. 2016)

== Deaths ==
- January 2 – Emil Jannings, 65, Swiss-born German actor, The Blue Angel, The Last Laugh
- January 12 – John M. Stahl, 63, American film director and producer, Leave Her to Heaven, Imitation of Life
- January 22
  - Alan Hale Sr., 57, American actor, director, The Adventures of Robin Hood, Santa Fe Trail
  - Corinne Luchaire, 28, French actress, Prison Without Bars, Conflict
- March 10 – Marguerite De La Motte, 47, American actress, The Mark of Zorro, The Iron Mask
- March 18 – Edgar Rice Burroughs, 74, American writer, creator of Tarzan
- March 25 – Frank Buck, 66, American actor and animal expert, Bring 'Em Back Alive, Africa Screams
- April 7 – Walter Huston, 67, American Academy Award-winning actor, The Treasure of the Sierra Madre, Dodsworth
- April 26 – Hobart Cavanaugh, 63, American actor, I Cover the Waterfront, A Letter to Three Wives
- May 1 – Ernst Laemmle, 49, German director and screenwriter, The Phantom of the Opera, The Palm Beach Story
- June 22 – Jane Cowl, 66, American actress, No Man of Her Own, Payment on Demand
- July 17 – Antonie Nedošinská, 65, Czech actress, Falešná kočička aneb Když si žena umíní, Capek's Tales
- September 13 – Sara Allgood, 69, Irish actress, How Green Was My Valley, The Lodger
- October 23 – Al Jolson, 64, Lithuanian-born American actor, singer, entertainer, The Jazz Singer, Rhapsody in Blue, The Singing Fool
- October 29 – Maurice Costello, 73, American actor, Du Barry Was a Lady, Tin Pan Alley
- December 4 – James Kevin McGuinness, 56, Irish-American producer and screenwriter, Madame X, Rio Grande
- December 28 – William Garwood, 66, American silent-film actor and director, The Cowboy Millionaire, Proxy Husband

== Film debuts ==
- Lillian Adams – Crisis
- Rico Alaniz – The Capture
- Chris Alcaide – The Glass Menagerie
- Robert Ayres – They Were Not Divided
- Parley Baer – Comanche Territory
- John Drew Barrymore – The Sundowners
- James Best – One Way Street
- Lyle Bettger – No Man of Her Own
- Marlon Brando – The Men
- Angela Brunner – Heart of Stone
- William Campbell – The Breaking Point
- Philip Carey – Three Husbands
- Jean-Pierre Cassel – Pigalle-Saint-Germain-des-Prés
- Carol Channing – Paid in Full
- Robert Cornthwaite – Union Station
- Richard Crenna – Let's Dance
- Royal Dano – Undercover Girl
- Ossie Davis – No Way Out
- James Fox – The Miniver Story
- Alan Gifford – The Kangaroo Kid
- Robert Griffin – Barricade
- Peter Hansen – Branded
- Stacy Harris – Appointment with Danger
- Melvyn Hayes – The Blue Lamp
- Tippi Hedren – The Petty Girl
- Craig Hill – Cheaper by the Dozen
- John Horsley – Highly Dangerous
- Glyn Houston – The Blue Lamp
- Robert Hoy – Ambush
- Jeffrey Hunter – Julius Caesar
- Tab Hunter – The Lawless
- Lionel Jeffries – Stage Fright
- Andrew Keir – The Gorbals Story
- Mike Kellin – So Young So Bad
- Piper Laurie – Louisa
- John Phillip Law – The Magnificent Yankee
- Yvonne Lombard – Jack of Hearts
- Sophia Loren – Totò Tarzan
- Carmen Lozano – Un soltero difícil
- Victor Maddern – Seven Days to Noon
- Marne Maitland – Cairo Road
- Richard Marner – Highly Dangerous
- Lewis Martin – The Blazing Sun
- Strother Martin – The Damned Don't Cry
- Gina Mascetti – Variety Lights
- Emile Meyer – Panic in the Streets
- Vera Miles – When Willie Comes Marching Home
- Rita Moreno – So Young, So Bad
- Jack Palance – Panic in the Streets
- Richard Pearson – The Woman in Question
- Stuart Randall – Bells of Coronado
- Nutan – Hamari Beti
- Peter Sellers – The Black Rose
- Robert F. Simon – Where the Sidewalk Ends
- Cyril Shaps – Cairo Road
- Flor Silvestre – Primero soy mexicano
- Bud Spencer – That Ghost of My Husband
- Angela Stevens – Tea for Two
- Peter Swanwick – Lilli Marlene
- Ugo Tognazzi – The Cadets of Gascony
- Michael Trubshawe – They Were Not Divided
- Franca Valeri – Variety Lights
- Robert Wagner – The Happy Years
- George D. Wallace – The Sun Sets at Dawn
- Jack Warden – The Asphalt Jungle
- Patrick Wayne – Rio Grande
- Robert Webber – Highway 301
- Joseph Wiseman – With These Hands
- Sheb Wooley – Rocky Mountain
