= List of Soviet films of the 1950s =

A list of films produced in the Soviet Union between 1950 and 1959:

== 1950s ==
- Soviet films of 1950
- Soviet films of 1951
- Soviet films of 1952
- Soviet films of 1953
- Soviet films of 1954
- Soviet films of 1955
- Soviet films of 1956
- Soviet films of 1957
- Soviet films of 1958
- Soviet films of 1959
