= Without a Woman =

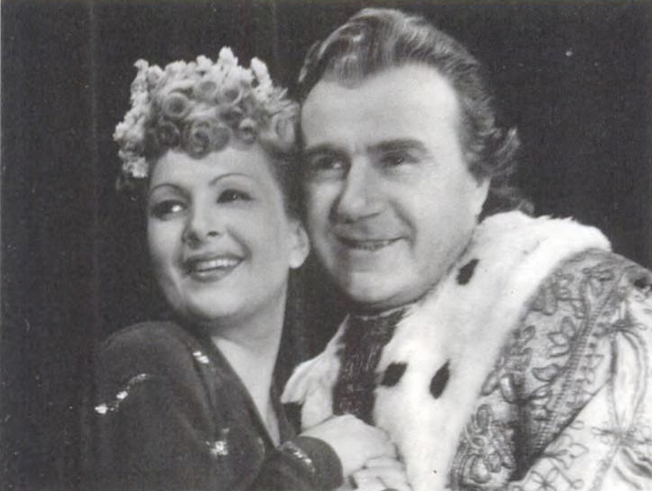
- Jachino and Lugo in a film scene
- Directed by: Alfredo Guarini
- Written by: Achille Campanile; Alfredo Guarini
- Starring: Giuseppe Lugo; Silvana Jachino; Umberto Melnati
- Cinematography: Renato Del Frate; Enzo Serafin
- Edited by: Dolores Tamburini
- Music by: Felice Montagnini
- Production company: Excelsa Film
- Distributed by: Minerva Film
- Release date: 27 September 1943
- Running time: 82 minutes
- Country: Italy
- Language: Italian

Without a Woman (Italian: Senza una donna) is a 1943 Italian "white-telephones" comedy film directed by Alfredo Guarini and starring Giuseppe Lugo, Silvana Jachino and Umberto Melnati.

The art directors Piero Filippone and Mario Rappini worked on the film's sets. It was shot at Cinecittà in Rome and the Fert Studios of Turin. Location filming took place around Pieve Ligure near Genoa.

== Synopsis ==
A misogynistic Duke shuts himself up in a castle along with several other men. However their peace is disturbed by the arrival of some stranded female dancers who have missed their train.

== Cast ==
- Giuseppe Lugo as Il principe Giannettini detto Giorgio Del Manto
- Silvana Jachino as Marta
- Umberto Melnati as Il duca Venanzio Navarra
- Carlo Campanini as Michelino Panigatti
- Guglielmo Barnabò as Adalgiso Barni Vagnoli
- Jone Morino as Donna Gloria
- Jone Salinas as Valeria
- Maria Dominiani as Maria
- Doretta Sestan as Stefania
- Guglielmo Sinaz as L'impresario Pappalardo
- Franco Coop as Oreste Tromba
- Arturo Bragaglia as Il legale del duca
- Anna Arena as Anna
- Bacot as Il cameriere custode del castello
- Vittorina Benvenuti as Bettina, la sorella del duca
- Gino Bianchi as Marchi
- Luigi Erminio D'Olivo as L'accompagnatore della signora Tromba
- Pina Gallini as Stella
- Lydia Johnson as La signora Tromba
- Alfredo Martinelli as Un testimone
- Edda Soligo as La segretaria dell'istituto di bellezza

== Bibliography ==
- Roberto Chiti & Enrico Lancia. Dizionario del cinema italiano: I film. Gremese Editore, 2005.
