= List of Japanese films of 1950 =

A list of films produced in Japan in 1950 (see 1950 in film).

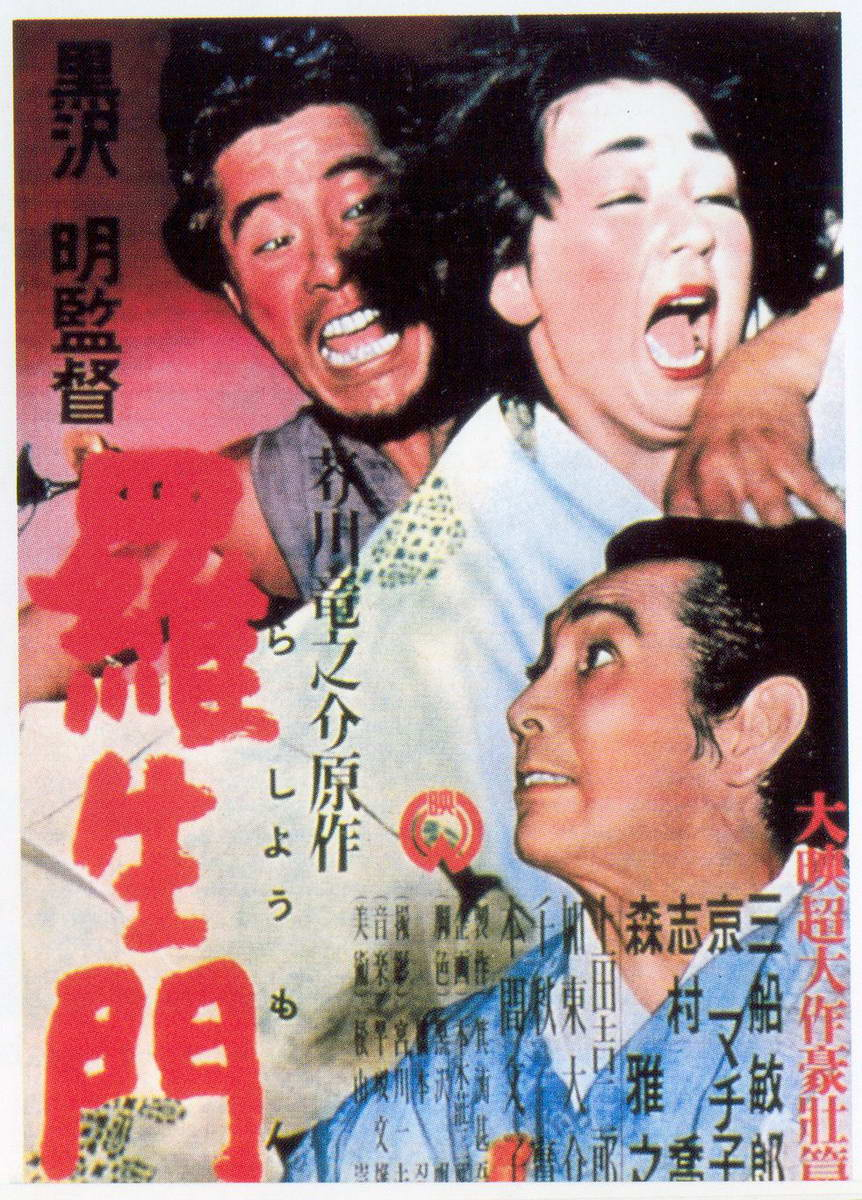
Rashomon

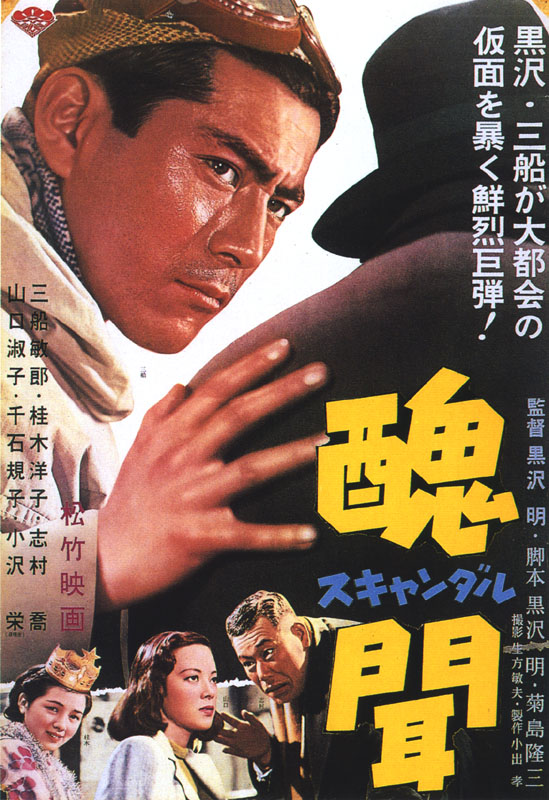
Scandal

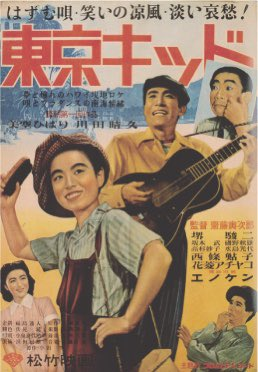
Tokyo Kid

Title	Director	Cast	Genre	Notes
Battle of Roses	Mikio Naruse	Kuniko Miyaki, Setsuko Wakayama	Drama	
Conduct Report on Professor Ishinaka	Mikio Naruse	Shigeo Miyanta, Atsushi Watanabe	Comedy	
An Engagement Ring	Keisuke Kinoshita	Toshirō Mifune, Kinuyo Tanaka	Romance	
Escape at Dawn	Senkichi Taniguchi	Ryō Ikebe, Shirley Yamaguchi	Drama, War, Romance	
The Munekata Sisters	Yasujirō Ozu	Choko Iida, Hideko Takamine	Drama	
Portrait of Madame Yuki	Kenji Mizoguchi	Michiyo Kogure, Yoshiko Kuga	Drama	
Rashomon	Akira Kurosawa	Toshirō Mifune	Crime, Drama, Mystery, Jidaigeki	Won the Golden Lion at the 1951 Venice Film Festival
Scandal	Akira Kurosawa	Toshirō Mifune	Drama	
Tokyo Kid	Torajiro Saito	Hibari Misora, Haruhisa Kawata, Shunji Sakai	Musical comedy	
Until We Meet Again	Tadashi Imai	Eiji Okada, Yoshiko Kuga		Won Best Film at the 1st Blue Ribbon Awards and at the 5th Mainichi Film Awards
Clothes of Deception	Kôzaburô Yoshimura	Machiko Kyô, Keiju Kobayashi, Ichirô Sugai	Drama	Won Best Cinematography at the 1st Blue Ribbon Awards as well as Best Screenplay at the 5th Mainichi Film Awards

== See also ==
- 1950 in Japan
