= Women Without Names =

Women Without Names may refer to:

- Women Without Names (1940 film), an American drama film
- Women Without Names (1950 film), an Italian drama film
