= Romulus and the Sabines =

Romulus and the Sabines may refer to:

- Romulus and the Sabines (1961 film), an Italian adventure comedy film
- Romulus and the Sabines (1945 film), an Italian comedy film
