= Blonde (1950 film) =

1950 film

- Directed by: Maurice Cam
- Written by: Georgius (novel); Max Glass
- Produced by: Jean de Cavaignac; Max Glass
- Starring: Jules Berry; Denise Grey; Marcel André
- Cinematography: Victor Arménise
- Edited by: Louis Devaivre
- Music by: Georges Tzipine
- Production company: Max Glass Film
- Distributed by: Les Réalisations d'Art Cinématographique
- Release date: 1 September 1950
- Running time: 90 minutes
- Country: France
- Language: French

Blonde (French: Tête blonde) is a 1950 French comedy crime film directed by Maurice Cam and starring Jules Berry, Denise Grey and Marcel André. The film's sets were designed by the art director Guy de Gastyne.

== Synopsis ==
A man discovers a package on the Paris Metro and takes it home. It turns out to contain the severed head of a blonde woman. The police come to suspect that he may be guilty of murdering one of his acquaintances, but in fact she has gone to the countryside. The real murderer is eventually exposed.

== Cast ==
- Jules Berry as Frédéric Truche
- Denise Grey as Isabelle Truche
- Marcel André as L'inspecteur Paulot
- Pauline Carton as La concierge de Claire
- Jeanne Fusier-Gir as Mélanie
- Marcelle Géniat as La grand-mère
- Marcel Mouloudji as Bernard
- Michèle Philippe as Claire Fontanier
- Louis Seigner as Maître Canard
- Jean Tissier as Le prisonnier
- Jean Berton as L'agent
- Campion
- Raymond Cordy as Le brigadier
- Claudine Céréda as Claudine
- Yvonne Dany
- Charles Dechamps as Le juge d'instruction
- Jacques Denoël as Le journaliste
- Fernand Gilbert as Le gardien de prison
- Raymond Girard
- René Génin as Le fossoyeur
- Jim Gérald as Le médecin
- Roger Krebs
- Frédéric Mariotti as Le gardien
- Maximilienne as Madame Rabichou
- Georges Pally as Le chauffeur
- Robert Pizani as Martin
- Jean Pétavin
- Tania Soucault
- Jean Témerson as Le valet
- François Vibert
- Henri Vilbert as L'inspecteur Lambert

== Bibliography ==
- Philippe Rège. Encyclopedia of French Film Directors, Volume 1. Scarecrow Press, 2009.
