= Metropolitan (1939 film) =

1939 film

- Directed by: Maurice Cam
- Written by: Max Maret; André Cerf; Maurice Cam
- Produced by: Simon Barstoff
- Starring: Albert Préjean; Ginette Leclerc; André Brulé
- Cinematography: Nicolas Hayer; Pierre Méré; Marcel Villet
- Edited by: Georges Lantz
- Music by: Marcel Lattès
- Production company: S.B. Films
- Distributed by: Les Films Vog
- Release date: 8 February 1939
- Running time: 85 minutes
- Country: France
- Language: French

Metropolitan (French: Métropolitain) is a 1939 French thriller film directed by Maurice Cam and starring Albert Préjean, Ginette Leclerc and André Brulé. It was shot at the Photosonor Studios in Courbevoie on the outskirts of Paris and on location around the city. The film's sets were designed by the art director Roland Quignon. The film was remade in Britain the following year as A Window in London with the setting moved to the London Underground.

== Synopsis ==
While travelling on the Paris Métro, a man spots what looks like a murder being committed.

== Cast ==
- Albert Préjean as Pierre
- Ginette Leclerc as Viviane
- André Brulé as Zoltini
- Albert Duvaleix as Chef de l'information
- Yvonne Yma as Mme Valreau
- Maxime Fabert as Cyprien
- Pierre Sergeol as Jackson
- René Lacourt as Valreau
- Anne Laurens as Suzanne
- Madeleine Simon as Simone
- Marcel Pérès as Ami dans le métro
- Paul Faivre as Le client du 65
- Henri de Livry as Régisseur
- Paul Demange as Employé du journal
- Georgette Tissier as Standardiste

== Bibliography ==
- Hodgson, Michael. Patricia Roc. Author House, 2013.
- Walker-Morrison, Deborah. Classic French Noir: Gender and the Cinema of Fatal Desire. Bloomsbury Publishing, 2020.
