= Appointment for Murder =

- Directed by: Baccio Bandini
- Written by: Baccio Bandini; Sandro Continenza
- Music by: Gino Marinuzzi Jr.
- Release date: 27 November 1951
- Running time: 90 minutes
- Country: Italy
- Language: Italian

Appointment for Murder (Italian: Amo un assassino t.l. I Love A Killer) is a 1951 Italian crime-thriller-melodrama film drama directed by Baccio Bandini.

== Plot ==
A woman is found dead in the atrium of a Roman building. In that same building lives the police commissioner Pietrangeli, in charge of the investigations, with his daughter Silvia. It soon turns out that Manni, the new tenant of the building, was the husband of the dead woman. The couple had been separated for some time, but the woman kept asking him for money. The man tries to exonerate himself, but the alleged alibi cannot be revealed, in fact Manni has for some time now formed a bond with Silvia who has never had the courage to speak with her father. Cornered, the girl confesses and runs away with the man but she is tracked down thanks to the help of Giorgio, another tenant. During a tough confrontation, the police arrive who had been alerted by an anonymous phone call. Thanks to this phone call from a night club, the commissioner will be able to discover the identity of the murderer and withdraw the resignation he had submitted due to the delicate situation in which he found himself.

== Cast ==
- Umberto Spadaro as Detective Pietrangeli
- Delia Scala as Silvia Pietrangeli
- Andrea Bosic as Aldo Manni
- Marco Vicario as Giorgio Morelli
- Natale Cirino as Palermo
- Dorian Gray as Vandina
- Angelo Maggio
- Marga Cella
- Alma De Río
- Dina Perbellini
- Amina Pirani Maggi
- Diana Veneziani
- Maria Zanoli
