= Achille Millo =

Italian actor and stage director

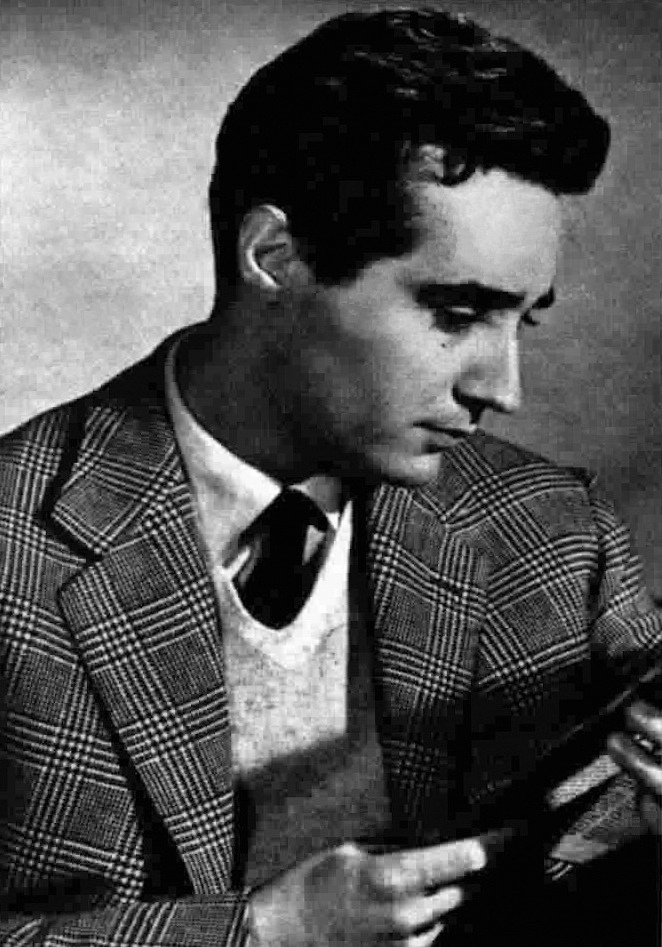
- Millo in Radiocorriere magazine, 1954.
- Born: Achille Scognamillo; 25 October 1922; Naples, Italy
- Died: 18 October 2006 (aged 83); Rome, Italy
- Occupation: Actor • stage director

Achille Scognamillo, stage name Achille Millo (Naples, 25 October 1922 – Rome, 18 October 2006), was an Italian actor and stage director.

== Selected filmography ==
- The Models of Margutta (1946)
- Cab Number 13 (1948)
- Terra senza tempo (1950)
- Immortal Melodies (1952)
- Lieutenant Giorgio (1952)
- Half a Century of Song (1952)
- Neapolitan Carousel (1954)

== Voice recordings ==
- Italian version of "Barbara" poem by Jacques Prévert, music of Joseph Kosma with accordion Franco Scarica Fonit Italy 1960
