= Peppino Spadaro =

Italian actor

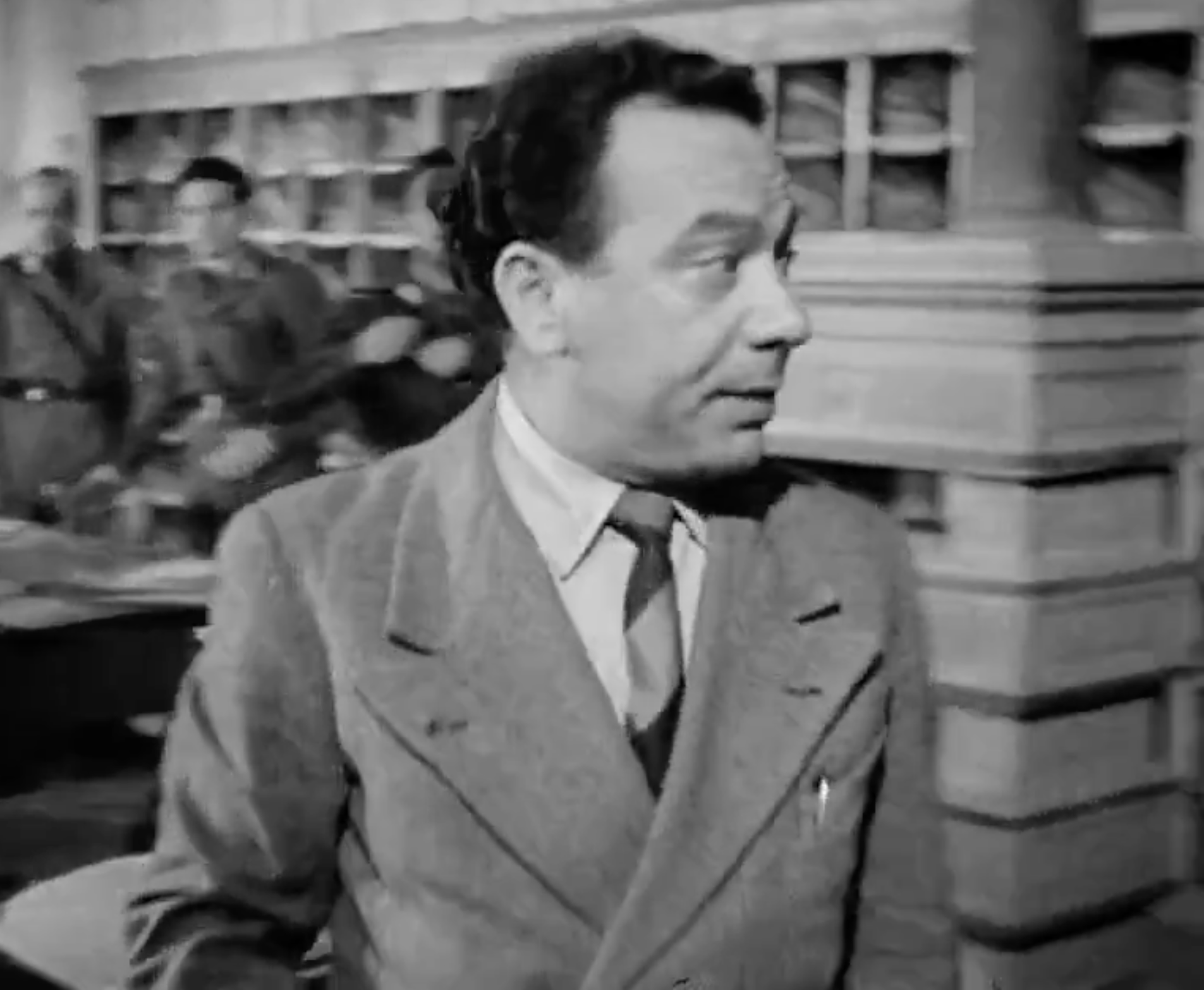
- Spadaro in the movie Bicycle Thieves (1948)
- Born: 6 August 1898; Piedimonte Etneo, Metropolitan City of Catania, Kingdom of Italy
- Died: 20 November 1950 (aged 52); Rome, Italy
- Other name: Giuseppe Spadaro
- Occupation: Actor
- Years active: 1940–1950 (film)

Peppino Spadaro (1898–1950) was an Italian actor. His brother Umberto Spadaro was also an actor.

== Selected filmography ==
- 1860 (1934)
- Saint John, the Beheaded (1940)
- Jealousy (1942)
- Sealed Lips (1942)
- The Taming of the Shrew (1942)
- Music on the Run (1943)
- Farewell Love! (1943)
- Lively Teresa (1943)
- L'abito nero da sposa (1945)
- Romulus and the Sabines (1945)
- The Street Has Many Dreams (1948)
- Margaret of Cortona (1950)
- Night Taxi (1950)
- Terra senza tempo (1950)
- Cavalcade of Heroes (1950)
- Ring Around the Clock (1950)

== Bibliography ==
- Ann C. Paietta. Saints, Clergy and Other Religious Figures on Film and Television, 1895–2003. McFarland, 2005.
