= Passione fatale =

- Directed by: Ernesto Grassi
- Release date: 1950
- Country: Italy
- Language: Italian

Passione fatale is a 1950 Italian film directed by Ernesto Grassi.

== Cast ==
- Jone Paoli
- Aldo De Franchi
- Mara Landi
- Agostino Salvietti
- Vittoria Crispo
