= La taverna della libertà =

- Directed by: Maurice Cam
- Starring: Umberto Spadaro, André Le Gall, Jacqueline Plessis
- Distributed by: Variety Distribution
- Release date: 1950
- Country: Italy
- Language: French

La taverna della libertà (lit. The Tavern of Freedom) is a 1950 Italian film directed by Maurice Cam. It is often presented as a remake of the 1949 French film Drame au Vel'd'Hiv', also directed by Cam but the films, both set during the war, present very different plots.

== Cast ==
- Umberto Spadaro
- André Le Gall
- Jacqueline Plessis
- Giulio Stival
- Jone Salinas
- Memo Benassi
- Armando Migliari
- Enrico Glori
- Gianni Santuccio
- Marco Vicario
