= André Brulé =

French actor (1879–1953)

André Brûlé
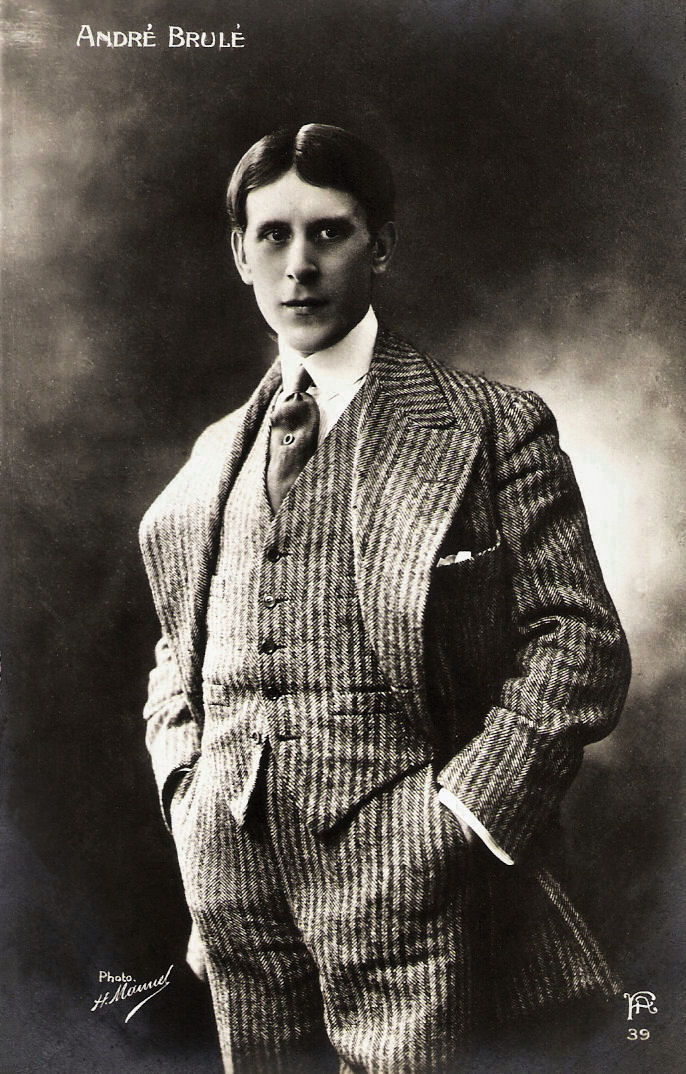
- Born: 26 September 1879; Bordeaux, France
- Died: 14 February 1953 (aged 73); Paris, France
- Occupation: Actor
- Years active: 1910–1943 (film)
- Partner: Ghislaine Dommanget

André Brulé (26 September 1879 – 14 February 1953), was a French theatre and film actor. He created the character Arsène Lupin for the French stage in 1908.

He had a relationship with Ghislaine Dommanget, a French comedy actress, with whom he had a son. She later married Louis II, Prince of Monaco.

== Filmography ==
- Werther (1910): Werther
- Le club des élégants (1912): John Veryle
- Les frères corses a.k.a. The Corsican Brothers (1917)
- People Who Travel a.k.a. Les gens du voyage (1938): Fernand
- Vidocq (1938): Vidocq
- L' étrange nuit de Noël (1939): Doctor Carter
- Metropolitan (1939): Zoltini
- Le château des quatre obèses (1939)
- Retour de flamme (1943): Mr. De Nogrelles
