= Maurice Cam =

French film director

- Born: 25 September 1901; Marseille, France
- Died: 21 April 1974 (aged 72); Marseille, France
- Other name: Maurice Camugli
- Occupation: Film director
- Years active: 1931–1967 (film)

Maurice Cam (25 September 1901 – 21 April 1974) was a French film director. He directed fourteen films between 1939 and 1967 as well as working as assistant director and other various jobs in the film industry.

Cam was originally an illustrator, who worked on film posters. Cam made his directoral debut with the 1939 thriller Metropolitan, set partly on the Paris Métro. The film was a hit, and was remade the following year in Britain as A Window in London.

== Selected filmography ==
- Metropolitan (1939)
- Bifur 3 (1945)
- La Taverna della libertà (1950)
- Blonde (1950)
- Bouquet of Joy (1951)
- A Girl in the Sun (1953)

== Bibliography ==
- Hodgson, Michael. Patricia Roc. Author House, 2013.
- Rège, Philippe. Encyclopedia of French Film Directors, Volume 1. Scarecrow Press, 2009.
