= La Valle dell'odio =

- Directed by: Adriano Zancanella
- Release date: 1950
- Country: Italy
- Language: Italian

La Valle dell'odio is a 1950 Italian drama film directed by Adriano Zancanella.

== Cast ==
- Antonio Strobl
- Ottavio Fedrizzi
- Ilse Gray
