= Vendetta di zingara =

- Directed by: Aldo Molinari
- Release date: 1950
- Running time: 96 minutes
- Country: Italy
- Language: Italian

Vendetta di zingara (meaning 'The Gypsy Woman's Revenge' in English) is a 1950 Italian film directed by Aldo Molinari.

== Cast ==
- Felga Lauri as Fiamma
- Anna Vita as Myrka
- Sergio Raimondi as Sergio
- Maria Piazzai
- Domenico Tosi
- Marisa Benedetti
- Rosario Borelli
- Anita Davila
- Silvia Fazi
- Luciano Brancucci
- Giovanni Lovatelli
- Bruno Tocci
