= Due sorelle amano =

- Directed by: Jacopo Comin
- Music by: Marcel Delannoy
- Release date: 1950
- Country: Italy
- Language: Italian

Due sorelle amano is a 1950 Italian romantic drama film directed by Jacopo Comin.

== Cast ==
- Jone Salinas as Maria Pia
- Eleonora Rossi Drago as Marilù, Maria Pia's sister
- Peter Trent as Tom
- Maria Grazia Francia as Other sister
- Gaby Morlay as Sisters' mother
- Carlo Tamberlani as Sisters' father
- Marina Vlady
