= Bacot =

Bacot is a surname. Notable people with the surname include:

- Armando Bacot (born 2000), American basketball player
- Arthur William Bacot (1866–1922), English entomologist
- H. Parrott Bacot (1941–2020), American art historian
- J. Carter Bacot (1933–2005), president of The Bank of New York for eight years and chairman and CEO for sixteen years
- Jacques Bacot (1877–1965), explorer and pioneering French Tibetologist
- John Bacot (1821–1888), New Zealand politician
