= Terra senza tempo =

- Directed by: Silvestro Prestifilippo
- Written by: Giorgio Capitani; Leonardo Cortese
- Release date: 1950
- Country: Italy
- Language: Italian

Terra senza tempo is a 1950 Italian film directed by Silvestro Prestifilippo.

== Cast ==
- Barbara Berg
- Leonardo Cortese
- Jone Frigerio as Baroness Capuana
- Achille Millo
- Aldo Silvani
- Peppino Spadaro
- Liliana Tellini
- Adriana Mafrici Mariuccia
