= Jone Salinas =

Italian actress

- Born: 8 March 1918; Reggio Calabria, Calabria, Italy
- Died: 27 May 1992 (aged 74); Rome, Lazio, Italy
- Other name: Ione Martello
- Occupation: Actress
- Years active: 1939 - 1964 (film)

Jone Salinas (8 March 1918 – 27 May 1992) was an Italian film actress. She was married to the producer Antonio Musu.

== Filmography ==
Year	Title	Role	Notes
1939	An Adventure of Salvator Rosa	Amalia	
1940	Fortuna		
1940	L'arcidiavolo	Erika Villa	
1940	Eternal Melodies	Nannina Mozart	
1941	L'allegro fantasma		(scenes deleted)
1941	L'ultimo combattimento	Maria	
1941	L'elisir d'amore	Giannetta	
1941	L'amore canta	Rosa	
1942	Yes, Madam	Enrichetta	
1942	Soltanto un bacio	Anna	
1942	Gioco pericoloso		
1942	Yellow Hell	La fanciulla indigena	
1942	I quattro di Bir El Gobi		
1943	La danza del fuoco	Cecilia De Monteros	
1943	Without a Woman	Valeria	
1947	A Man About the House	Maria	
1947	Apocalipse		
1948	Ruy Blas	Casilda, la servante	
1948	The Charterhouse of Parma		Uncredited
1949	In the Name of the Law	La baronessa Teresa Lo Vasto	
1949	Vertigine d'amore	Fifi'	
1950	Due sorelle amano	Maria Pia	
1950	La taverna della libertà		
1951	Behind Closed Shutters	Bit part	Uncredited
1953	What Scoundrels Men Are!	Gina	
1955	Carosello del varietà		
1956	Symphony of Love	Colomba Calafatti	
1958	Toto and Marcellino	Ardea	
1964	Beautiful Families		(segment "Il principe azzurro")
1965	La fuga	Andrea's Mother	(final film role)

== Bibliography ==
- Goble, Alan. The Complete Index to Literary Sources in Film. Walter de Gruyter, 1999.
