= Il Mulatto =

- Directed by: Francesco De Robertis
- Written by: Francesco De Robertis
- Release date: 1950
- Country: Italy
- Language: Italian

Il Mulatto is a 1950 Italian drama film directed by Francesco De Robertis.

== Plot ==
A busker, during the Allied occupation, commits a theft and ends up in prison. He learns that his wife suffers violence and then dies in childbirth and, when he comes out of prison, he discovers that his son is black, but with blond hair. She would like to repudiate him, but she approaches him and, when she falls ill, prays for his safety. One day the brother of the real father shows up and the child, impressed by his black songs, hears the call of the race and clings to him.

== Cast ==
- Angelo Maggio as Angelo, il mulatto
- Renato Baldini as Matteo Belfiore
- Bianca Doria
- Jole Fierro
- H. Mohammed Hussein
- Giulia Melidoni
- Nino Milano
- Umberto Spadaro as Don Genna
