= Jole Fierro =

Italian actress (1926–1988)

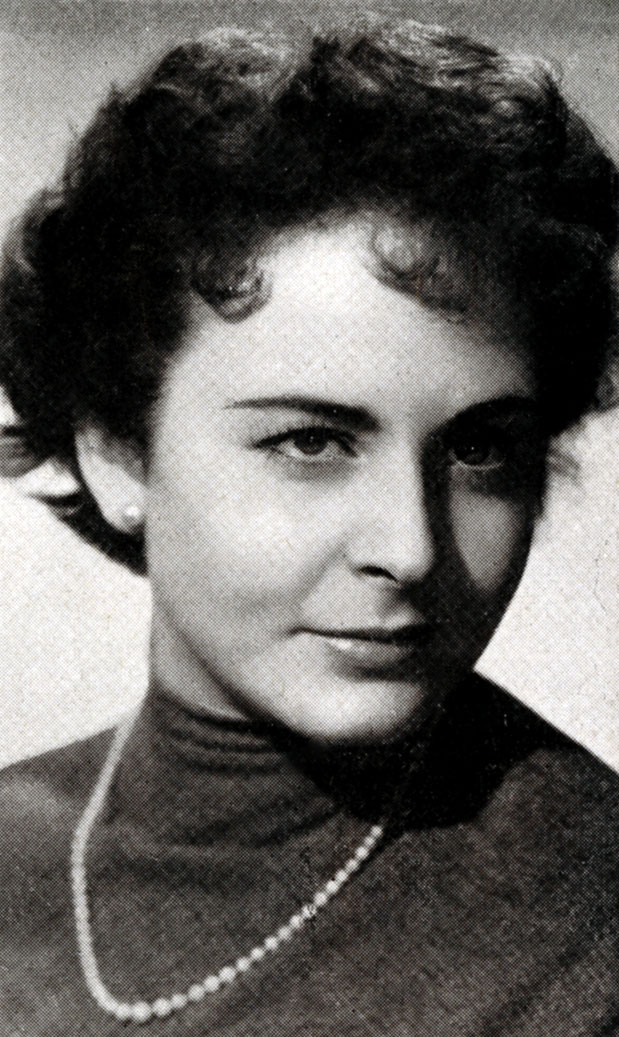
- Born: 22 November 1926; Salerno, Kingdom of Italy
- Died: 27 March 1988 (aged 61); Rome, Italy
- Occupation: Actress

Jole Fierro (22 November 1926 – 27 March 1988) was an Italian actress.

Born in Salerno, Italy, Fierro made her debut in the early 1950s in the Neapolitan dialect theater, and shortly later she made her first appearances in films. In June 1954, she acted in the surreal comedy play written and directed by Dario Fo I sani da legare, then, in the autumn of the same year, she entered the prestigious stage company of Eduardo De Filippo, with whom she achieved some large success. She was also critically appreciated for her performances in Miseria e nobiltà by Mario Scarpetta and in Palummella zompa e vola by Antonio Petito.

Fierro had a significant career in Italian television, where she starred in dozens of television films and series, while her film career was mainly limited to character roles. She had a long relationship with actor Arnoldo Foà, and the couple had a daughter, Annalisa.

== Selected filmography ==
- Captain Demonio (1950)
- Figaro Here, Figaro There (1950)
- The Beggar's Daughter (1950)
- Il Mulatto (1950)
- That Ghost of My Husband (1950)
- Viva il cinema! (1952)
- Loving You Is My Sin (1953)
- Nero and the Burning of Rome (1953)
- The Island Monster (1954)
- Tuppe tuppe, Marescià! (1958)
- Il bell'Antonio (1960)
- Colpo gobbo all'italiana (1962) as Ines
- The Beast (1974)
- Salvo D'Acquisto (1974)
- Hotel Fear (1977)
- The Blue-Eyed Bandit (1980)
