= List of Soviet films of 1950 =

A list of films produced in the Soviet Union in 1950 (see 1950 in film).

Title	Russian title	Director	Cast	Genre	Notes
1950
Brave People	Смелые люди	Konstantin Yudin	Sergei Gurzo, Alexey Gribov, Tamara Chernova, Oleg Solyus	War film	
Conspiracy of the Doomed	Заговор обречённых	Mikhail Kalatozov	Lyudmila Skopina	Drama	
Cossacks of the Kuban	Кубанские казаки	Ivan Pyryev	Marina Ladynina, Sergei Lukyanov, Yuri Lyubimov, Aleksandr Khvylya, Klara Luchko, Viktor Avdyushko	Musical	
Dream of a Cossack	Кавалер Золотой Звезды	Yuli Raizman	Sergei Bondarchuk	Drama	
The Fall of Berlin	Падение Берлина	Mikheil Chiaureli	Starring Mikheil Gelovani as Joseph Stalin	War drama	Won Crystal Globe
Far from Moscow	Далеко от Москвы	Aleksandr Stolper	Nikolay Okhlopkov	Drama	
The Lights of Baku	Огни Баку	Iosif Kheifits, Rza Takhmasib, Aleksandr Zarkhi	Mirza Aliyev, Merziyye Davudova, Nikolai Okhlopkov	Drama	
Mussorgsky	Мусоргский	Grigori Roshal	Aleksandr Borisov, Nikolai Cherkasov	Biopic	Entered into the 1951 Cannes Film Festival
The New China	Освобожденный Китай	Sergei Gerasimov		Documentary	Entered into the 1951 Cannes Film Festival
Secret Mission	Секретная миссия	Mikhail Romm	Nikolai Komissarov	Drama	
The Tale of the Fisherman and the Fish	Сказка о рыбаке и рыбке	Mikhail Tsekhanovsky		Animation	
Zhukovsky	Жуковский	Vsevolod Pudovkin; Dmitri Vasilyev	Yuri Yurovsky	Biopic	Pudovkin received the Best Director award at the 5th Karlovy Vary International Film Festival for the film.

== See also ==
- 1950 in the Soviet Union
