= The Funicular of Mount Faloria =

1950 film directed by Michelangelo Antonioni

La Funivia del faloria
- Directed by: Michelangelo Antonioni
- Release date: 1950
- Running time: 10 minutes
- Country: Italy
- Language: Italian

La Funivia del faloria (The Funicular of Mount Faloria ) is a 1950 Italian documentary film directed by Michelangelo Antonioni.

The film takes the viewer on a cable car ride through the Dolomites. Much of the film was shot in Cortina d'Ampezzo.
