= La escalinata =

1950 black-and-white Venezuelan film

- Film poster
- Directed by: César Enríquez
- Written by: Elia Marcelli
- Starring: Óscar Jaimes; Rubén Saavedra; María Luisa Sandoval; Violeta González
- Cinematography: Boris Doroslovacki; Giuseppe Nisoli
- Music by: Rhazés Hernández López
- Production company: Civenca
- Release date: 1950
- Running time: 75 minutes
- Country: Venezuela
- Language: Spanish

La escalinata is a black-and-white drama film by Venezuelan director César Enríquez released in 1950. The film is considered Enríquez's masterpiece and one of the best Venezuelan films produced in the 1950s. It is considered one of the first neorealist films in Venezuela and Latin America.

In 2016, the film was voted one of the 50 Best Venezuelan Films in a survey conducted by the National Cinematheque of Venezuela. It is also one of 15 films considered part of Venezuela's film heritage by UNESCO and included in the Memory of the World Programme.

== Plot ==
Pablo, a young man from a humble background who has managed to escape poverty, returns to the neighborhood of his childhood in search of Juanito, but is unable to find him. His sister Delia tells him that Juanito has lost his job as a construction worker and is now involved in crime.
