= Il nido di Falasco =

Il nido di falasco
- Directed by: Guido Brignone
- Written by: Luigi Ugolini (book)
- Music by: Ezio Carabella
- Release date: 1950
- Running time: 92 minutes
- Country: Italy
- Language: Italian

Il nido di falasco is a 1950 Italian melodrama film directed by Guido Brignone.

== Cast ==
- Umberto Spadaro
- Liliana Tellini
- Ermanno Randi
- Gaetano Verna
- Carlo Lombardi
- Pina Piovani
- Checco Durante
- Maria Zanoli
