= List of Egyptian films of 1950 =

A list of films produced in Egypt in 1950. For an A-Z list of films currently on Wikipedia, see Category:Egyptian films.

Title	Director	Cast	Genre	Notes
Akhlaq Lil Bai (Virtue for Sale)	Mahmoud Zulfikar	Mahmoud Zulfikar, Faten Hamama	Fantasy	
El Millionair (The Millionaire)				
Shatie el Gharam (Shore of Love)	Itihad Elfananeen	Hussein Sedki, Laila Murad, Tahia Carioca, Mohsen Sarhan	Drama	
