= Ippodromi all'alba =

- Directed by: Alessandro Blasetti
- Starring: Arnoldo Foà
- Narrated by: Arnoldo Foà
- Cinematography: John Ventimiglia
- Music by: Franco Casavola
- Release date: 1950
- Country: Italy
- Language: Italian

Ippodromi all'alba is a 1950 Italian short documentary film directed by Alessandro Blasetti.
