= Liliana Tellini =

Italian actress and voice actress

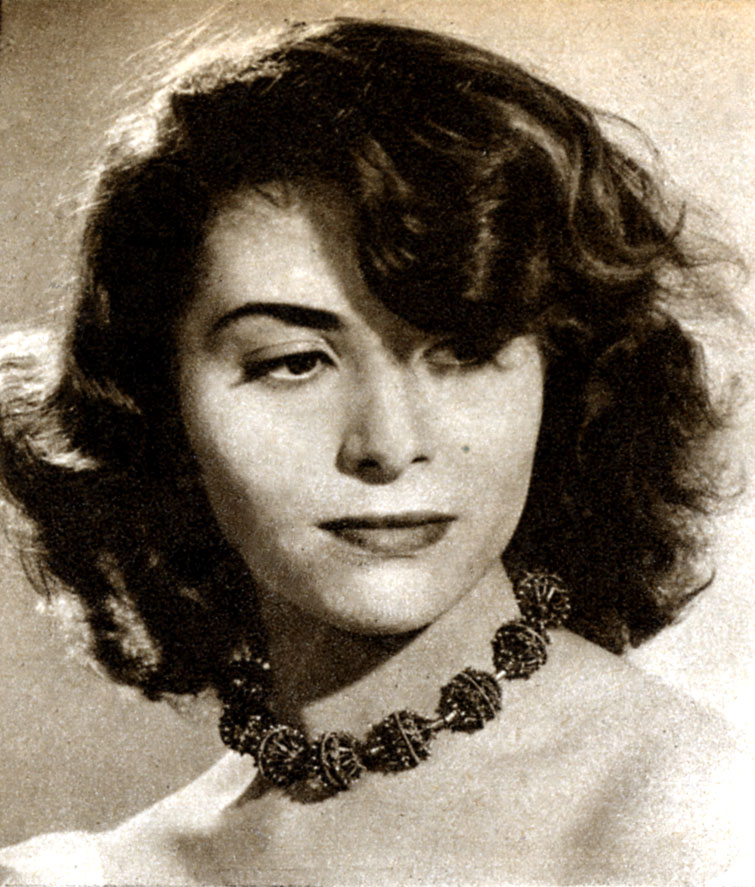
- Born: Liliana Polledri; 19 January 1925; Florence
- Died: 15 June 1971 (aged 46); Rome
- Occupation: Actress
- Spouse: Piero Tellini

Liliana Tellini (19 January 1925 – 15 June 1971) was an Italian actress and voice actress.

== Life and career ==
Born in Florence as Liliana Polledri she was the daughter of a Swiss father and a Venetian mother. She enrolled at the Centro Sperimentale di Cinematografia in Rome, graduating in 1949. After taking part to the Mario Costa's short film Breve storia, Tellini made her film debut in Géza von Radványi's ensemble drama film Women Without Names. Tellini was also active on stage, radio and television, until her retirement in the late fifties.

She was married to the director and screenwriter Piero Tellini.

== Selected filmography ==
- Women Without Names (1950)
- Il nido di Falasco (1950)
- Terra senza tempo (1950)
- The Sky Is Red (1950)
- Operation Mitra (1951)
- A Tale of Five Cities (1951)
- Palace Hotel (1952)
- The Merchant of Venice (1953)
