= L' Isola bianca =

1950 Italian short documentary film directed by Dino Risi

- Directed by: Dino Risi
- Release date: 1950
- Country: Italy
- Language: Italian

L' Isola bianca (Italian: The white island) is a 1950 Italian short documentary film directed by Dino Risi.
