= Ernesto Grassi =

Italian philosopher (1902–1991)

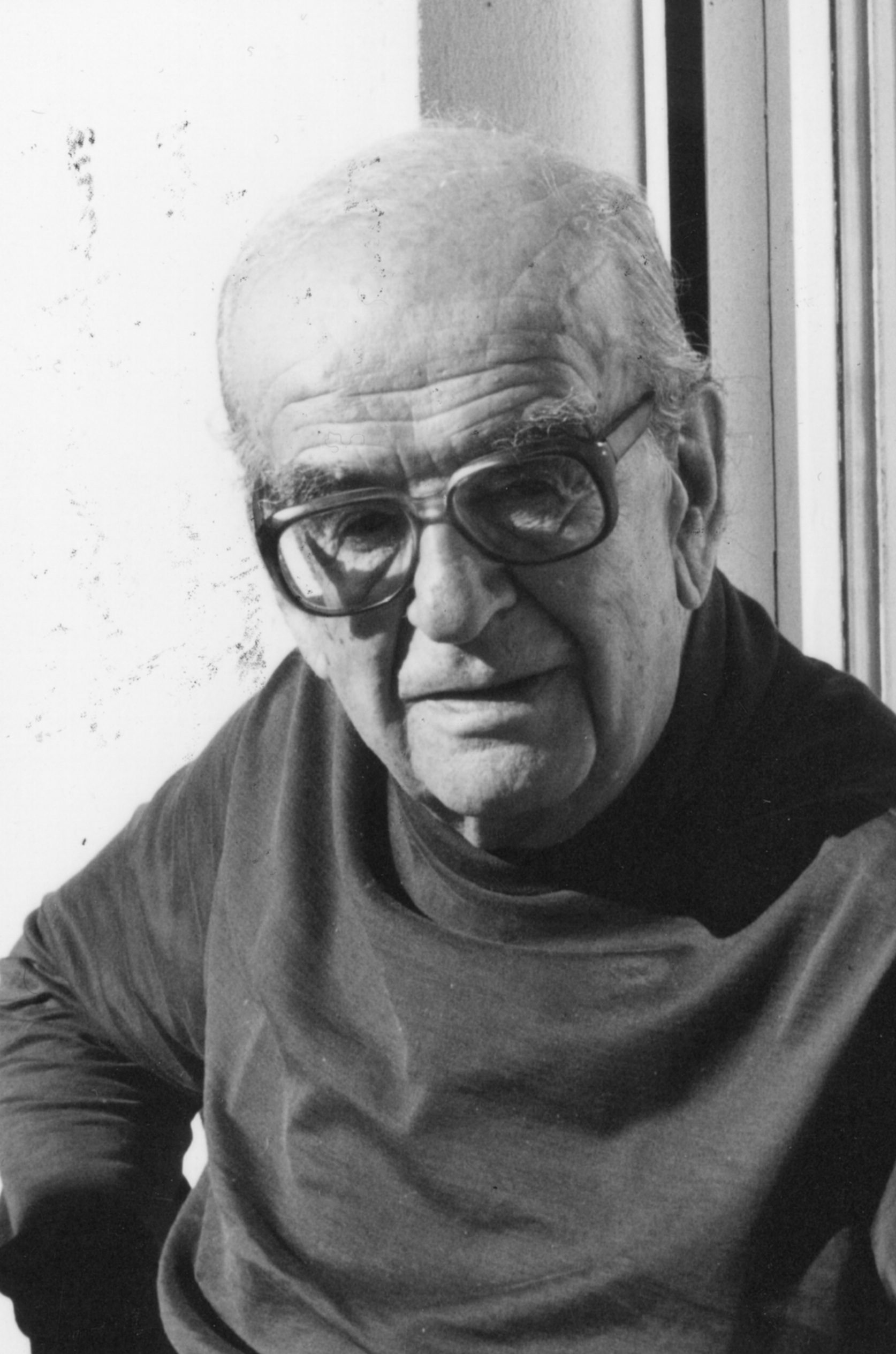
- Professor Grassi at the lectern in Berlin
- Born: 2 May 1902; Milan, Kingdom of Italy
- Died: 22 December 1991 (aged 89); Munich, Bavaria, Germany
- Occupation: Philosopher

Ernesto Grassi (2 May 1902 – 22 December 1991) was an Italian philosopher.

== Personal life ==
Ernesto Grassi was the son of Giovanni Battista Grassi and Caterina Luce. He studied philosophy in Milan under Piero Martinetti and later worked with the French Philosopher Maurice Blondel in Aix-en-Provence. He graduated in 1928 and moved to Germany in the same year. He lived and worked in several European cities, Freiburg, Berlin, Zurich and Munich.

He maintained an intimate friendship with Donald Phillip Verene.

== Career and works ==
Grassi sought to take up the Heideggerean Destruktion of metaphysics, grounding his philosophical enterprise instead in the tradition of rhetoric. He identified the Italian humanist tradition as a potential site to begin this development of philosophy, and his works often contain copious references to the Italian humanists. In this tradition, "work and metaphor are the source of human history and society", an approach to thought which must reject the rational, proceeding as it does from "general and necessary premises."

His work Rhetoric as Philosophy is considered "the first protracted attempt to synthesize Italian humanism with rhetoric, as a source of philosophical invention."

== Theory on rhetoric and humanism ==
Looking at the theory of Ernesto Grassi of rhetoric and humanism, he inherited ideas from the likes of Plato, Aristotle, Cicero and Quintilian to help introduce and assure his theory. Grassi was quite specific when it came to understanding his ideas. He starts with making sure that the "description of the nature of rhetoric is to summarize the distinction he draws between critical or rational discourse and topical discourse," (Golden. Berquist, Coleman, & Sprouse. 2011, 307). When it comes to his theory, he normally would side with Giambattista Vico (an Italian philosopher, 1668–1744).

There are three primary faculties of true rhetoric:

- Ingenium: The most important and essential to the understanding of humanistic tradition. Those who have an issue within this "trait" have issues with traditional humanistic advances within their lives.
- Work: This "trait", according to Grassi, helps develop the understanding of need and development of the history of mankind. It allows us to create our imprints of today for the history of tomorrow.
- Metaphor: With this, according to Grassi, a person must be able to bring together Ingenium and work, making Metaphor beneficial for the continuation of growth and development.

Ingenium, Work, and Metaphor are intertwined with knowledge, rationality, language and play a role in nature.
