= Umberto Spadaro =

Italian actor

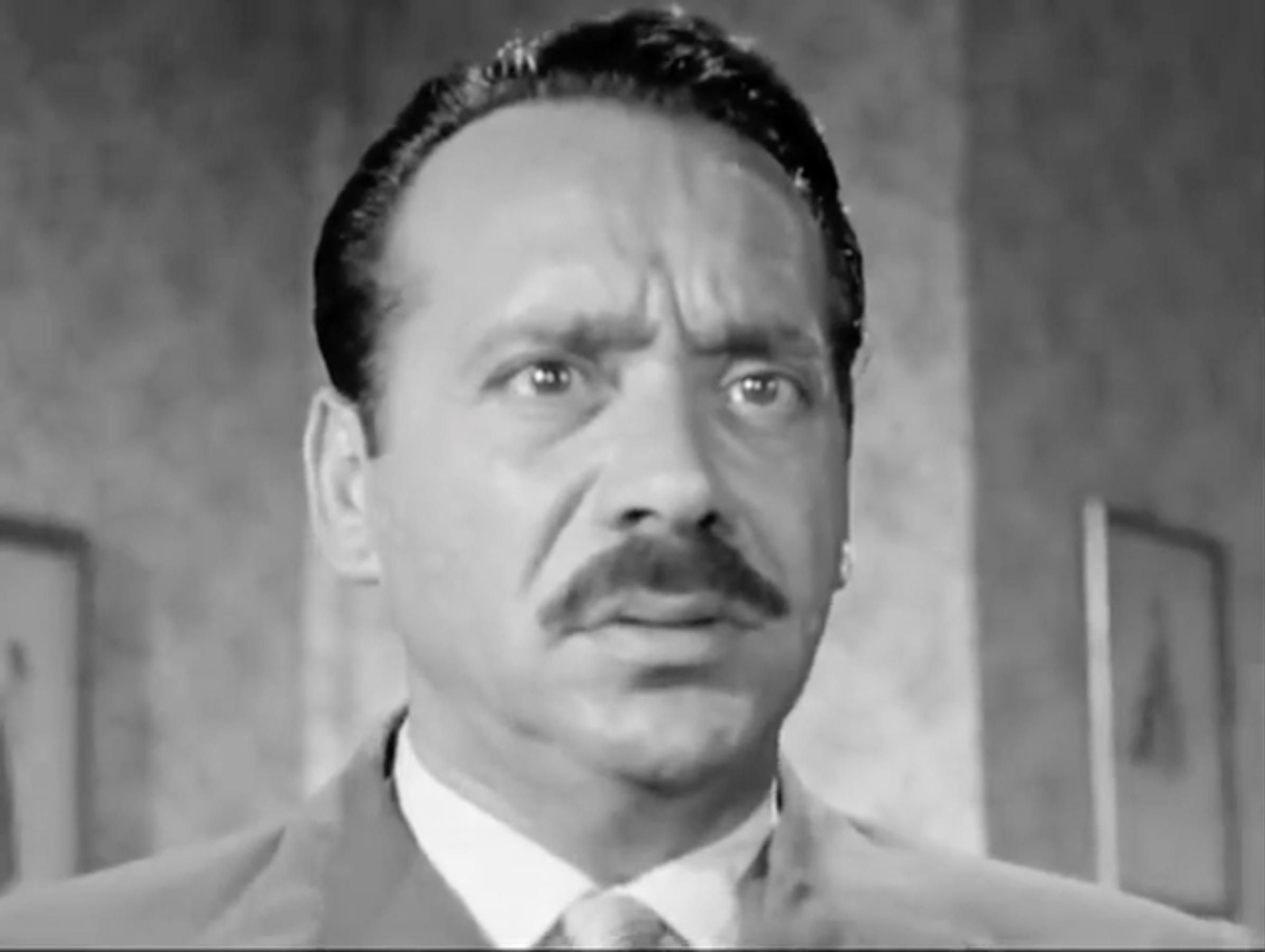
- Spadaro in Appointment for Murder (1951)
- Born: 8 November 1904; Ancona, Kingdom of Italy
- Died: 12 October 1981 (aged 76); Rome, Italy
- Occupation: Actor
- Years active: 1940–1979

Umberto Spadaro (8 November 1904 – 12 October 1981) was an Italian actor.

He appeared in around 95 films between 1940 and 1979. His brother Peppino Spadaro was also an actor.

== Selected filmography ==
- Cavalleria rusticana (1939) – Saltimbanco (uncredited)
- Senza cielo (1940)
- Caravaggio (1941)
- Blood Wedding (1941) – Maso
- Il cavaliere senza nome (1941)
- Catene invisibili (1942) – Un amico di Enrico al biliardo
- The Two Orphans (1942) – Il custode della stazione
- Wedding Day (1942) – Un cameriere (uncredited)
- Jealousy (1942) – Il testimone Sante di Mauro
- L'usuraio (1943)
- Two Hearts Among the Beasts (1943) – Lo stregone
- Sempre più difficile (1943) – Mucugno
- Rita of Cascia (1943) – Il delatore nella taverna
- Vietato ai minorenni (1944)
- Macario Against Zagomar (1944) – Touzille, il cenciaiolo
- Mist on the Sea (1944) – Il fuochista
- La Fornarina (1944) – Un cliente dell'osteria
- For the Love of Mariastella (1946) – Fifì il gobbo, calzolaio
- Fury (1947) – Rocco
- The Opium Den (1947)
- L'apocalisse (1947)
- Tombolo (1947)
- Il principe ribelle (1947)
- Legge di sangue (1948) – Gaetano
- Difficult Years (1948) – Aldo Piscitello
- I cavalieri dalle maschere nere (1948) – Gegè
- Ladri di biciclette (1948) – (uncredited)
- Il corriere di ferro (1948)
- Flying Squadron (1949) – Don Leoni
- Women Without Names (1950) – Pietro – guardia del campo
- Il Mulatto (1950) – Don Gennaro
- The Outlaws (1950) – Don Ciccio Balestrieri
- Pact with the Devil (1950) – Scoppola – the killer
- Angelo tra la folla (1950) – La Spada
- Il Brigante Musolino (1950) – Doctor Micheli
- Strano appuntamento (1950) – Rossi
- La taverna della libertà (1950)
- Il nido di Falasco (1950) – Luccio
- Brief Rapture (1951) – Commissario capo
- Without a Flag (1951) – Natale Papini – Lo scassinatore
- Appointment for Murder (1951) – Detective Pietrangeli
- A Woman Has Killed (1952) – Padre di Anna
- The Man in My Life (1952)
- The Eternal Chain (1952) – Maresciallo della legione straniera
- The Secret of Three Points (1952) – Colonnello Grimaldi
- Serenata amara (1952) – Il maestro di musica
- Papà ti ricordo (1952)
- The Angel of Sin (1952) – Scarpone
- Cats and Dogs (1952) – Don Filippo
- Jolanda la figlia del corsaro nero (1953) – Padre putativo di Jolanda
- Riscatto (1953) – Il cappellano Don Giulietti
- A Husband for Anna (1953) – Don Antonio Percucoco
- I Vinti (1953) – (uncredited)
- Martin Toccaferro (1953) – Signor Costanzi
- Journey to Love (1953) – Torquato Merumi
- Scampolo 53 (1953)
- Fatal Desire (1953) – Uncle Brasi
- Carmen (1953) – Commissario Barreiro
- Lasciateci in pace (1953) – Achille Buongiorno
- Passionate Song (1953) – Il Commissario
- Non vogliamo morire (1954) – Capitano del battello
- Tears of Love (1954) – Don Vincenzo Benetti
- Magic Village (1955) – Don Puglisi
- Je suis un sentimental (1955) – L'opéré
- Don Camillo's Last Round (1955) – Bezzi
- The Best Part (1955) – Gino – un ouvrier piémontais
- La catena dell'odio (1955) – Neri
- Amaramente (1956) – Commissario Ferri
- Manos sucias (1957) – Valero
- The Wide Blue Road (1957) – Gaspare Puggioni, 1st Coast Guard Officer
- A Farewell to Arms (1957) – Barber (uncredited)
- Ya tenemos coche (1958) – Don José
- Love and Troubles (1958) – Antonio
- ...And the Wild Wild Women (1959) – Direttore del carcere
- Under Ten Flags (1960) – Telegrafista
- The Four Monks (1962) – L'ortolano
- The Eye of the Needle (1963) – Luigino Trizzini – father of Rosaria
- Liolà (1964)
- A Fistful of Dollars (1964) – Miguel – Rojo Gunman (uncredited)
- Hercules and the Treasure of the Incas (1964) – Darmon Henchman
- The Naked Hours (1964) – Nonno
- Ballata da un miliardo (1967)
- Lo voglio maschio (1971)
- The Big Family (1973)
- La governante (1974)
- La sbandata (1974) – Doctor
- Il gatto mammone (1975) – Doctor
- I baroni (1975)
