= Women Without Names (1950 film) =

- Directed by: Géza von Radványi
- Written by: Corrado Alvaro; Liana Ferri; Géza von Radványi; René Barjavel; Geza Herczeg; Jesse Lasky Jr. John Ney; Fausto Tozzi
- Produced by: E. Lopert; R. Solmsen; Giorgio Agliani; Géza von Radványi
- Starring: Valentina Cortese; Simone Simon; Vivi Gioi; Françoise Rosay; Gino Cervi
- Cinematography: Gábor Pogány
- Edited by: Tatiana Casini Morigi; Elena Zanoli; René Le Hénaff
- Music by: Roman Vlad
- Production company: Navona Film
- Distributed by: ENIC
- Release date: 23 March 1950
- Running time: 100 minutes
- Country: Italy
- Language: Italian

Women Without Names (Italian: Donne senza nome) is an Italian drama film of 1950 directed by Géza von Radványi and starring Valentina Cortese, Simone Simon, Vivi Gioi, and Françoise Rosay.

== Plot ==
The film is set in the Casa Rossa displaced persons concentration camp in Alberobello, Apulia, after the Second World War. It shows what happened soon after the war to many women of different nationalities, coming into Italy from other parts of Europe, hoping to be repatriated or accepted by some other country. Yvonne Dubois (Simone Simon) is a Frenchwoman, ready to marry anyone to get out of the camp. Anna Petrovic (Valentina Cortese) is a young widow from Yugoslavia, locked up in the camp and expecting a child. Her husband was shot down before her eyes by the enemy. Janka Nowotska (Irasema Dilian) is a Pole who was working in a German brothel and has lost her mind. Hilda von Schwartzendorf (Vivi Gioi) is a German woman doctor, and there are also British women.

One day, with the help of Dubois, Anna tries to escape, but she goes into labour, gives birth to a baby boy, and dies in childbirth. The middle-aged Brigadier Zanini (Gino Cervi) hears the baby crying. Having lost his own wife and son, he tells his commanding officer that the baby is his. He is forced to resign, but he is allowed to keep the child.

== Production ==
The film's sets were designed by the art directors Piero Filippone and Dario Cecchi. It was filmed at the Cinecittà Studios in Rome.

== Partial cast ==
- Simone Simon as Yvonne Dubois
- Vivi Gioi as Greta
- Irasema Dilian as Janka Nowotska
- Gino Cervi as Brigadier Pietro Zanini
- Valentina Cortese as Anna Petrovic
- Mario Ferrari as Camp Commander
- Umberto Spadaro as Pietro, a camp guard
- Françoise Rosay as the Countess
- Eva Breuer as Christine Obear
- Gina Falckenberg as Dr Hilda von Schwartzendorf
- Carlo Sposito as Ciulian
- Liliana Tellini as Prisoner
- Lamberto Maggiorani as Anna's husband
- Betsy von Furstenberg as "Boche", German prisoner from Munich
- Nada Fiorelli as Prisoner
- Susan Donnell as British prisoner

== Bibliography ==
- Van Heuckelom. Polish Migrants in European Film 1918–2017. Springer, 2019.
