= Scandal (1950 film) =

1950 Japanese drama film by Akira Kurosawa

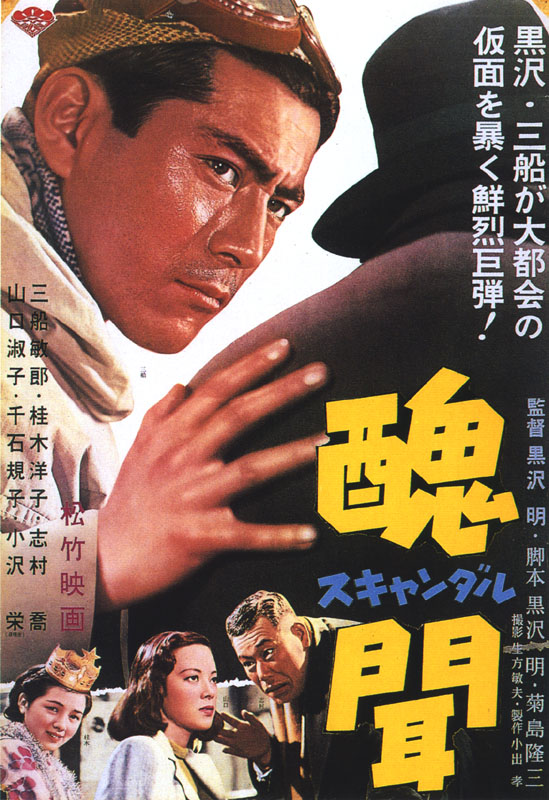
- Theatrical release poster
- Directed by: Akira Kurosawa
- Written by: Akira Kurosawa; Ryūzō Kikushima
- Produced by: Takashi Koide
- Starring: Toshirō Mifune; Takashi Shimura; Yoshiko Yamaguchi; Noriko Sengoku
- Cinematography: Toshio Ubukata
- Edited by: Yoshi Sugihara
- Music by: Fumio Hayasaka
- Production company: Shochiku Co. Ltd.
- Distributed by: Shochiku Co. Ltd.
- Release date: 30 April 1950
- Running time: 104 minutes
- Country: Japan
- Language: Japanese

Scandal (Japanese: 醜聞, Hepburn: Sukyandaru; or Shūbun) (Note: The Japanese title "醜聞" is a kanji word which is pronounced "Shūbun" in standard Japanese. However, the furigana "スキャンダル sukyandaru" is officially added to the Japanese title.) is a 1950 Japanese drama film directed by Akira Kurosawa and written by Kurosawa and Ryūzō Kikushima, and stars Toshiro Mifune, Takashi Shimura, and Yoshiko Yamaguchi. Produced by Shochiku, Scandal tells the story of the painter Aoye and singer Saijo and their efforts to take the editors of a tabloid magazine to court for falsely depicting them as romantically involved. The pair take on the services of the lawyer Hiruta who becomes racked with guilt when he offers a deal to the magazine to throw the case on purpose so that he can afford to take care of his tubercular daughter.

The film was conceived as a protest film against the spread of unfettered tabloid journalism. Kurosawa and Kikushima experienced some difficulty during the writing of the screenplay; Kurosawa found that the character of Hiruta began to draw his interest far more than the original tabloid court story. Shooting began in 1949 and ended in January 1950 amidst a series of personal and professional milestones for Kurosawa and Mifune. The film was released in Japan on 30 April 1950 to a degree of success, coming sixth on Kinema Junpo's Best Ten list for films of that year. Later assessments of the film have been more critical. Analyses of the film have focussed on the depiction of the press and spread of low culture mass media, and the idealistic morality of its characters.

== Plot ==
The artist Ichiro Aoye meets a famous young classical singer, Miyako Saijo, while he is working on a painting in the mountains. She is on foot, having missed her bus, but they discover they are staying at the same hotel. Aoye gives her a ride back to town on his motorcycle. On the way they are spotted by paparazzi from the tabloid magazine Amour. Saijo refuses to grant the photographers an interview, so they take a picture of Aoye and Saijo on the balcony of her room. The photo is published along with a fabricated story declaring a romantic connection between the two of them. Outraged by this manufactured scandal, Aoye confronts the editor of the magazine. When the editor tries to justify printing the story, Aoye punches him. Due to the story's publication, Aoye plans to sue the magazine.

During the subsequent media circus, Aoye is approached by a down-and-out lawyer, Hiruta, who claims to share Aoye's anger with the press. Aoye visits Hiruta's house and finds his daughter Masako, who is bedridden with tuberculosis. He decides to hire Hiruta as his attorney, but Hiruta is desperate for money to care for his daughter, so he accepts a bribe from the editor of Amour in exchange for agreeing to throw the trial. Hiruta uses the money to buy Masako expensive presents, but she realises something is wrong. Hiruta obliquely confesses to his daughter that he has taken money that he should not have. He continues to meet with the editor of the magazine regularly and spends money drinking and gambling.

Aoye and Saijo spend more time with Masako and observe Christmas with her. Hiruta, struck by the kindness of Aoye and Saijo towards Masako becomes ridden with guilt. He and Aoye go to a bar to celebrate Christmas together, where the patrons sing "Hotaru no Hikari". The trial proceeds badly for the plaintiffs as Hiruta refuses to cross-examine any witnesses. Masako becomes convinced that Hiruta is lying to Aoye and Saijo about the case even as they continue to visit her. Masako dies near the end of the trial, convinced that Aoye and Saijo will win since they have the truth on their side. On the final day in court Hiruta, prodded by his conscience, confesses to taking the bribe and Amour loses the case. Aoye and Saijo speak of Hiruta in a commending manner as the lawyer walks down a busy street. The posters advertising the original story by now are torn and illegible.

== Cast ==
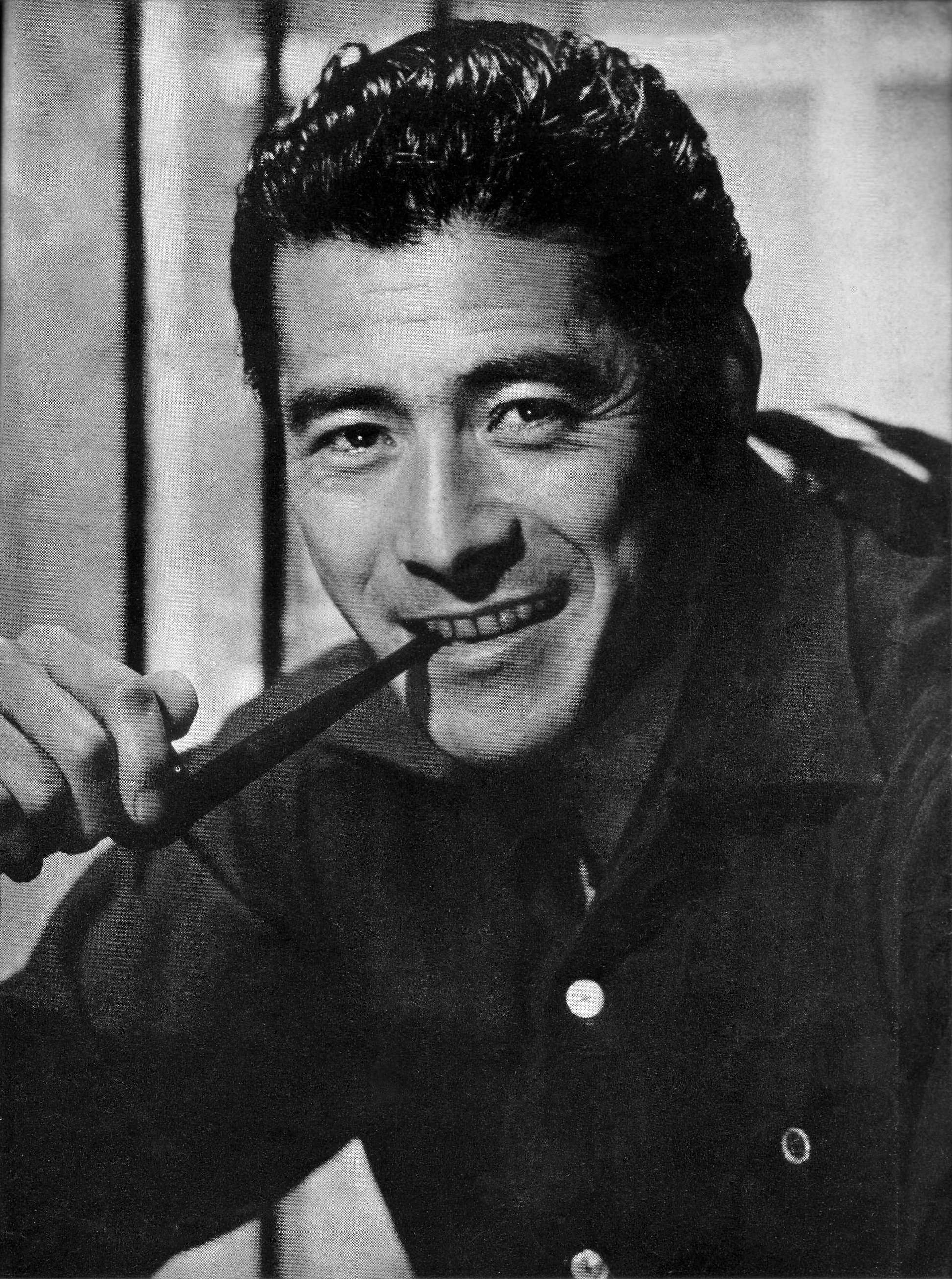
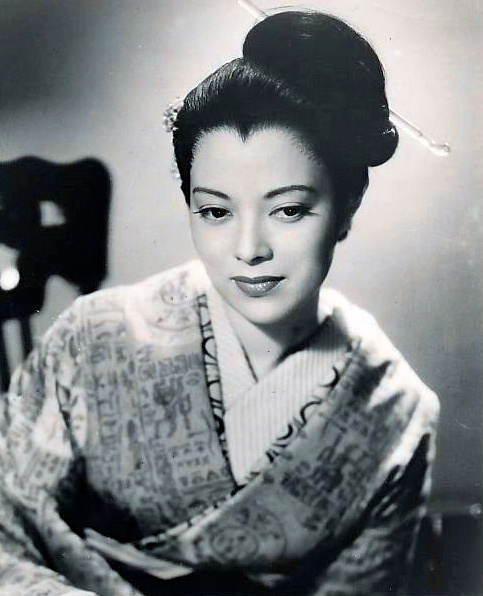
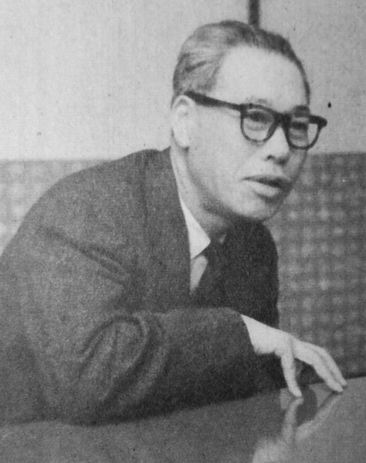
Actors Toshiro Mifune in 1954, Yoshiko Yamaguchi in 1950, and Takashi Shimura in 1956.
- Toshiro Mifune as Ichirō Aoye
- Takashi Shimura as Attorney Hiruta
- Yoshiko Yamaguchi as Miyako Saijo
- Noriko Sengoku as Sumie
- Yōko Katsuragi as Masako Hiruta
- Eitaro Ozawa as Hori
- Shinichi Himori as Editor Asai
- Ichiro Shimizu as Arai
- Fumiko Okamura as Miyako's mother
- Masao Shimizu as Judge
- Kokuten Kōdō as Old Man
- Bokuzen Hidari as Drunk
- Kōji Mitsui as Photographer

== Production ==
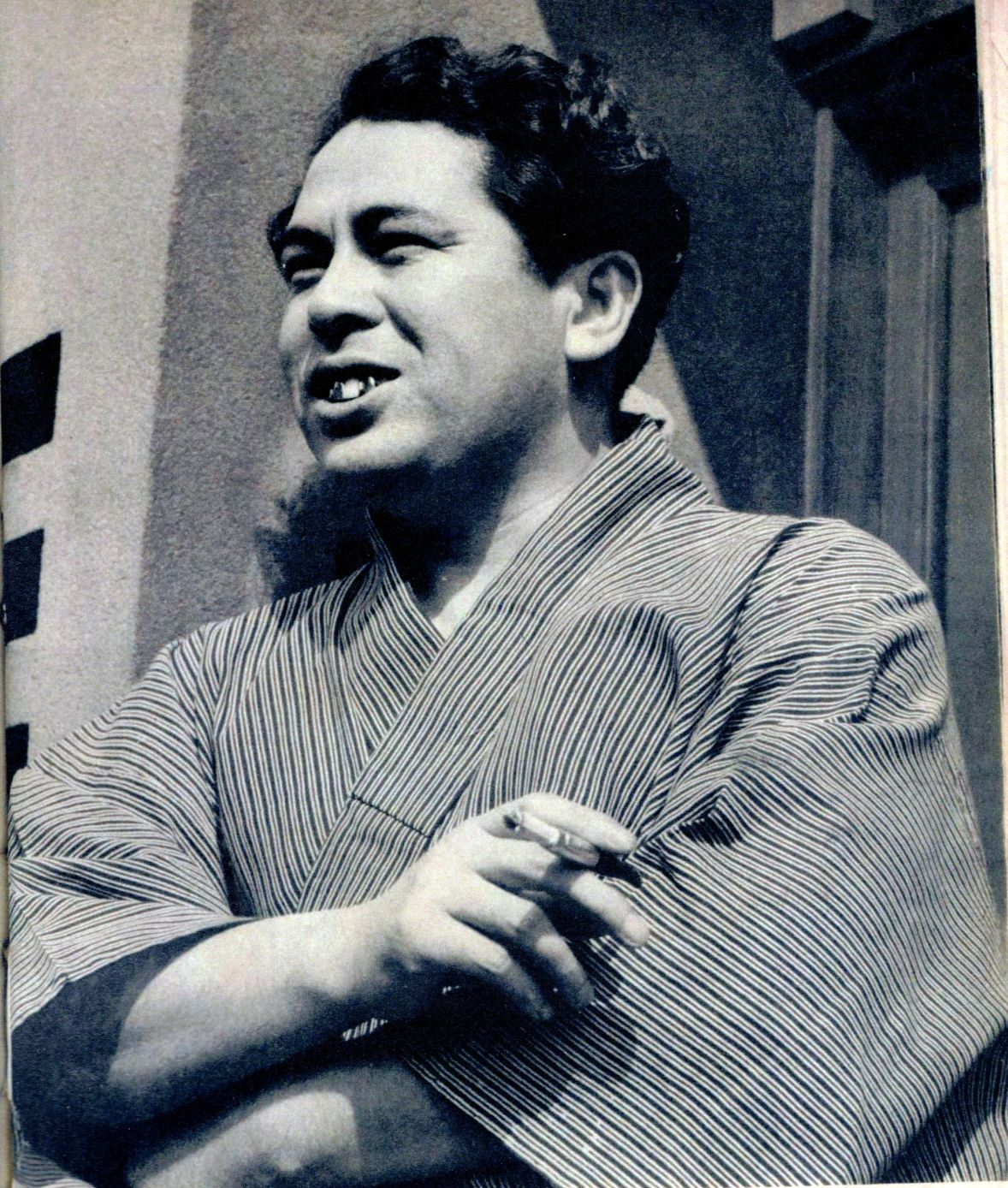
Co-screenwriter Ryūzō Kikushima in 1956.

In the aftermath of the Toho strikes and subsequent Red Purge of left-wing Japanese filmmakers from major studios, Kurosawa joined other filmmakers to form the independent production company Society of Film Artists to assist in the creation of his films. Scandal was conceived by Kurosawa as a protest film about the increasing popularity of tabloid journalism in Japan. Kurosawa, who generally did not engage with the press, had himself been the subject of rumours among magazines that had implied an unrequited romance between himself and the actress Hideko Takamine, whom Kurosawa had worked with on the film Horse (1941). The end of the occupation of Japan was approaching, and Kurosawa saw the rise in such journalism to be a social issue.

Scandal, produced by Shochiku, was co-written by Kurosawa and Ryūzō Kikushima. Kurosawa described some difficulty during the writing of the screenplay, with neither himself nor Kikushima feeling satisfied with its development. As he continued to write, Kurosawa found himself more interested by the character of Hiruta, and eventually wrote the film focussed around his character's internal conflict. About a year and a half after the film's release, he remembered that he had unconsciously based the character on a man he met at a bar once who spoke glowingly of his bedridden daughter while listing many faults with himself. Music in Scandal was used to contrast the image by way of aural cues to create a psychological tension. For example, the popular hit "Happy Tokyo" was used for dramatic scenes, and fanfares for the death of Hiruta's daughter, Masako.

Toshiro Mifune and Yoshiko Yamaguchi co-starred in the first of five collaborations together. Yamaguchi later reflected on the experience as having been a frightening one, describing the atmosphere of the set as "incredibly intense", and Kurosawa as kind but a perfectionist. The shooting of Scandal started in late 1949 and finished in January 1950, occurring concurrently with Mifune's wedding, and the realisation of several of Kurosawa's writing projects (including the premiere of Akatsuki no Dassō, and the filming of Tetsu of Jilba and Fencing Master). The film is 104 minutes long with the final cut being 2,860 metres in length. Around the time of Scandal's production and release, Kurosawa was conceptualising his next film Rashomon (1950). In particular he spent his time thinking about the structure of the titular gate seen in the film by location-scouting in Kyoto and Nara.

== Themes ==
=== Reality and tabloid journalism ===
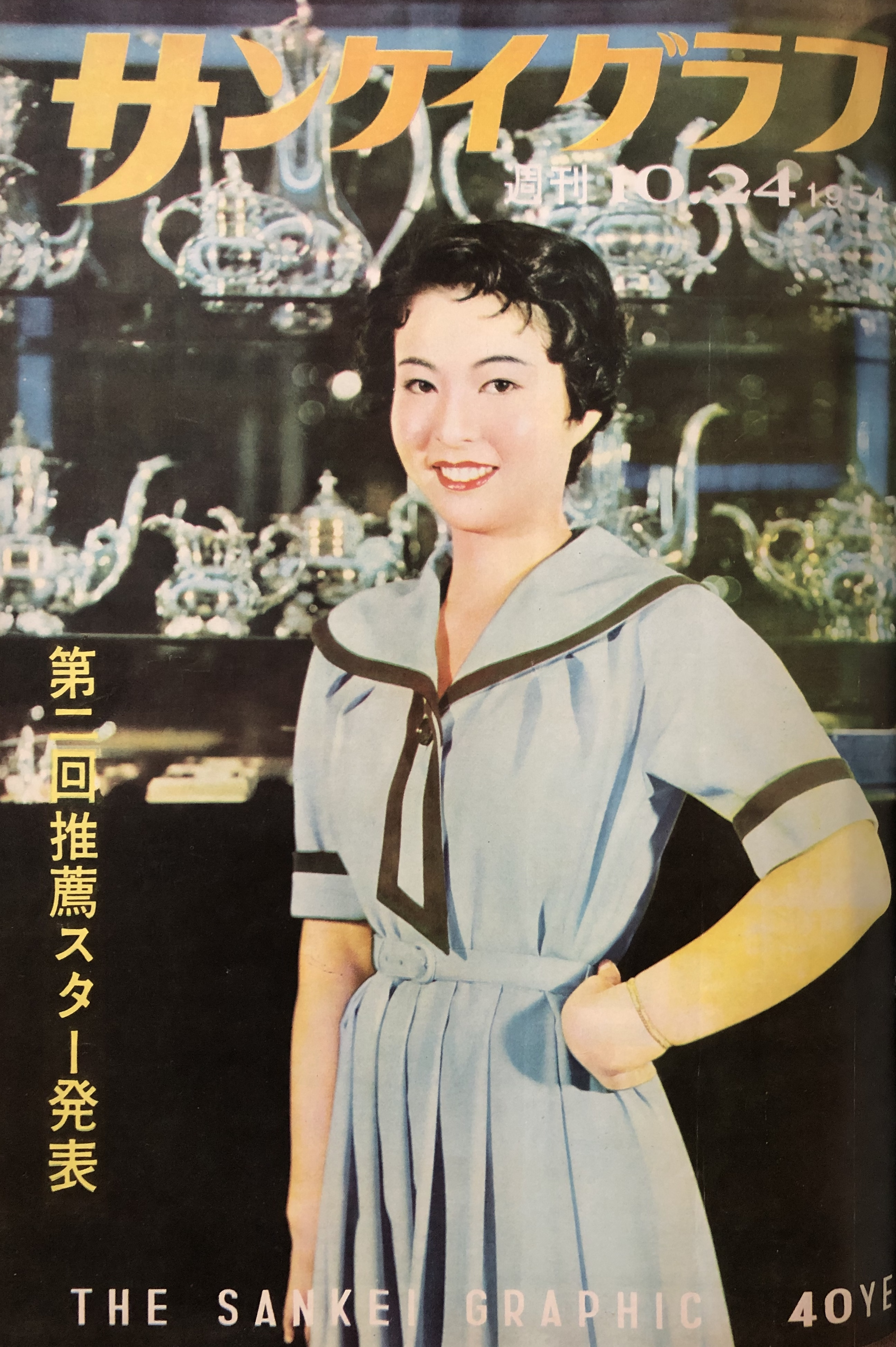
An example of a 1954 pictorial magazine

The film theorist Stephen Prince wrote that Scandal embodies the emergence of a new Japan following the Second World War. However, he believed the plot's emphasis on the abuse of freedom of speech by the tabloid press is underdeveloped due to the switch in focus to Hiruta's psychological struggle. In discussions of the film, some scholars have viewed Aoye as a self-insert character meant to represent Kurosawa himself. Placing Scandal in the context of the postwar publishing industry, the scholar Mitsuhiro Yoshimoto considered the film to be ahead of its time in tackling the commercially-driven tabloid journalism that proliferated; but also wrote that this thesis lacks persuasiveness when the focus shifts from the story of Aoye and Saijo towards the inner struggle of Hiruta. Yoshimoto compared the opening scene of Aoye's unrealistic landscape painting being critiqued by onlookers for its strangeness and originality to Aoye's critique of people using imitation to define themselves. Aoye sees his painting as retaining a truth about the landscape, whereas imitation of reality (embodied in the misleading photograph) gives a false understanding of the real relationship between Aoye and Saijo. However, Yoshimoto concludes that image and reality are not themes adequately developed to provide an answer to the relationship between them.

In Donald Richie's The Films of Akira Kurosawa (1965), he described the lack of moral ambiguity in the film's depiction of journalists, believing their depiction to be villainous, particularly in comparison to the other characters. To him, the courtroom scene is an illusion that hides the lies of Hiruta's crimes, such that when he confesses, the story itself is seen as an illusion, and Hiruta is redeemed. James Goodwin argued that the film extends the category of "criminal" to include the press which is depicted self-reflexively in the film's formalistic portrayal of mass media, particularly via the use of montage and wipe cuts. Stuart Galbraith IV noted the pace of the titular scandal's spread through society, believing the use of montage to replicate the speed of the story's spread. He commented that this builds to the film's final shot where interest in the story is shown to be so fleeting that the posters advertising it are already torn to be replaced by the next story. Richie agrees with the assessment, but argues that the moral focus is ostensibly straightforward unless one understands Hiruta as the film's hero for believing in the truth to save himself—despite the legal affair being over a temporary public fad—even as he loses everything materially.

According to the historian David Conrad, Scandal depicts aspects of kasutori culture, a phenomenon of early postwar Japan that refers to the proliferation of low-quality goods and low culture entertainment, derived from kasutori alcohol made from the dregs of sake production. Conrad links this culture of sleaze to western influence in the creation of the scandal, citing the journalists' use of European cameras rather than Japanese brands, the proliferation of erotic art, and the economic difficulties of the late occupation that sees Hiruta betray his clients and consume low-grade alcohol out of guilt. To Conrad this presents a contrasting vision of the democratic messaging of No Regrets for Our Youth (1946), instead he argued for a more moralistic observation to prevent the proliferation of kasutori culture.

=== Idealistic sentiment ===
Hotaru no Hikari
The Japanese-language version of "Auld Lang Syne" sung in Scandal.

Galbraith described the film's focus on idealism and purity shown through the metaphorical use of stars in its imagery. He cites the Christmas setting and star-decorated Christmas tree, the reflection of stars on water as Aoye and Hiruta drunkenly walk home together, and Aoye's reference to Masako as being "as pure as the stars". Galbraith considered Scandal—of all of Kurosawa's films—to be the most heavily influenced by American cinema, particularly by the films of Frank Capra. He compares the setting and singing of "Auld Lang Syne" to It's A Wonderful Life (1946), and the courtroom sequence to Mr. Smith Goes to Washington (1939) and A Free Soul (1931), the latter directed by Clarence Brown. To Galbraith, the scenes echoed in Scandal take the original films' sentimentality and turn them into something more self-reflexive as the characters sombrely reflect on their situation. He believes, however, that despite Shimura's performance, he is written to be too melodramatic, and that he does not regain any agency by confessing at the end.

Like Galbraith, Richie saw the daughter Masako as the film's moral centre. He analyses the Christmas scene wherein Aoye and Miyako celebrate the holiday with Masako and Hiruta's subsequent sentimental reaction to it. The reaction is intensified by Kurosawa's overlaying of Masako's bright face reflected on the glass window of the shoji framing Hiruta. However, he differs from Galbraith in his interpretation of the bar scene where the staff and patrons sing "Auld Lang Syne", believing it to instead represent the capability of all humanity to be good. Prince notes the tubucular daughter Masako's use of fantasy to escape her illness, where the dream is used to help ease her pain even though it is created from despair. He contrasts Fyodor Dostoevsky's negative treatment of the dreamer with Kurosawa's sympathetic view, believing that the positive imagination of Masako contests a stark acknowledgement of reality in the moral contradiction between truth and compassion in Kurosawa's works.

== Release ==
Scandal was released in Japan on 30 April 1950. Kurosawa later reflected that his aim of protesting the popularity of the scandal-ridden tabloid press had been mild and ineffectual. The film was released in the United States for the first time in 1964. In Los Angeles, Scandal was first presented as a double feature with Yasujiro Ozu's An Autumn Afternoon (1962). The film was re-released in cinemas in 1980 by Entertainment Marketing to mixed reviews. Scandal was included in a collection of Kurosawa's postwar films was released by Eclipse in 2008. In 2009, The Criterion Collection released Scandal alongside other Kurosawa films in a box set.

== Reception ==
In her book detailing Japanese cinema during the occupation period, Kyoko Hirano describes the film as a success. The film placed sixth on Kinema Junpo's annual Best Ten list for 1950, one place behind Rashomon. Writing for The New York Times in 1980, film critic Vincent Canby did not believe it was a great film, but considered it a satire of Hollywood melodrama and a subversive view of postwar Japan's ready acceptance of western values. However, a review in Variety magazine considered the story terrible, despite praising the acting talent. Noël Burch believed the film to be mediocre and indistinct from other films (that were not directed by Kurosawa). The film theorists Richie and Galbraith both describe the film as being "unbalanced". Prince describes Scandal's imagery as, "amazingly pedestrian", concluding that the film is one of the weakest in Kurosawa's postwar period.
