= That Ghost of My Husband =

1950 film

Quel fantasma di mio marito
- Directed by: Camillo Mastrocinque
- Written by: Gino De Santis; Camillo Mastrocinque
- Produced by: Ferdinando Briguglio
- Starring: Walter Chiari; Enzo Biliotti; Jole Fierro
- Cinematography: Adalberto Albertini
- Edited by: Eraldo Da Roma
- Music by: Franco Casavola
- Production company: Briguglio Film
- Distributed by: Briguglio Film
- Release date: 19 January 1950
- Running time: 95 minutes
- Country: Italy
- Language: Italian

That Ghost of My Husband (Italian: Quel fantasma di mio marito) is a 1950 Italian comedy film directed by Camillo Mastrocinque and starring Walter Chiari, Enzo Biliotti and Jole Fierro. The film's sets were designed by the art director Angelo Zagame. It financed by the Sicilian producer Ferdinando Briguglio who had previously backed Luigi Zampa's Difficult Years. For many years it was considered a lost film before being rediscover in an attic and restored by the Cineteca di Bologna and the National Museum of Cinema in Turin.

== Cast ==
- Walter Chiari as Gianni
- Medy Saint-Michel as Vivia
- Jole Fierro as Maria
- Enzo Biliotti as the senator
- Carlo Rizzo as the hotelier
- Enrico Luzi as Slim, newspaper editor
- Ernesto Almirante as Villa, Gianni's uncle
- Agnese Dubbini as Fatima, the witch
- Gianna Dauro as Madame Du Parc
- Franco Coop as Caliph El Kabir
- Cesare Bettarini as the newspaper director
- Carlo Pedersoli as the swimmer in the pool
- Leopoldo Valentini as the switchboard operator
- Marco Tulli as Arcangelo, the driver
- Leo Garavaglia as Achille Santi, the retired colonel
- Katia Suffi as Ginetta

== Bibliography ==
- Roberto Curti. Italian Gothic Horror Films, 1957-1969. McFarland, 2015.
