= Room to Let =

Room to Let may refer to:

- Room to let, a form of housing
- Room to Let (1950 film), a British historical thriller film
