= Desperate Farewell =

1955 Italian melodrama film

- Film poster
- Directed by: Lionello De Felice
- Screenplay by: Lionello De Felice; Vittorio Nino Novarese; Ernesto Guida; Sergio De Pascale
- Story by: Andrea Majocchi
- Starring: Massimo Girotti; Lise Bourdin; Andrea Checchi
- Cinematography: Mario Damicelli
- Edited by: Mario Serandrei
- Music by: Carlo Rustichelli
- Production company: Mambretti Film
- Distributed by: Diana Cinematografica
- Release date: September 6, 1955
- Running time: 100 minutes
- Countries: France; Italy
- Language: Italian

Desperate Farewell (Italian: Disperato addio) is a 1955 Italian melodrama film directed by Lionello De Felice and starring Massimo Girotti, Lise Bourdin and Andrea Checchi. It is a medical drama based on a novel by Andrea Majocchi.

== Cast ==
- Massimo Girotti as Dott. Andrea Pitti
- Lise Bourdin as Luisa Bozzi
- Andrea Checchi as Dott. Maurizio Marini
- Xenia Valderi as Anna
- Jane Hugo
- Marcella Rovena
- Emma Baron
- Nanda Primavera as Zia di Luisa
- Renato Malavasi
- Alessandro Fersen
- Aldo Silvani
- Augusto Pennella as Giorgio - son of Luisa
- Laura Gore
- Gisella Monaldi
- Eros Macchi
- Rita Livesi
- Nietta Zocchi

== Bibliography ==
- Goble, Alan. The Complete Index to Literary Sources in Film. Walter de Gruyter, 1999.
