= Treasure of the Golden Condor =

1953 film by Delmer Daves

- Directed by: Delmer Daves
- Written by: Delmer Daves
- Based on: Benjamin Blake; 1941 novel by Edison Marshall
- Produced by: Jules Buck
- Starring: Cornel Wilde; Constance Smith; Finlay Currie; Walter Hampden; Anne Bancroft
- Narrated by: Cornel Wilde
- Cinematography: Edward Cronjager
- Edited by: Robert L. Simpson
- Music by: Sol Kaplan
- Production company: 20th Century Fox
- Distributed by: 20th Century Fox
- Release date: February 4, 1953 (Los Angeles)
- Running time: 93 minutes
- Country: United States
- Language: English
- Budget: $1,220,000
- Box office: $1.2 million (US rentals)

Treasure of the Golden Condor is a 1953 American Technicolor adventure film directed by Delmer Daves, starring Cornel Wilde and Constance Smith, and released by Twentieth Century Fox. The film is a remake of the 1942 film Son of Fury: The Story of Benjamin Blake, which starred Tyrone Power. Both films were based on Benjamin Blake (1941), a novel by Edison Marshall.

== Plot ==
Jean Paul (Cornel Wilde) is a Frenchman, who is cheated of his birthright by his deceitful uncle, Marquis de St Malo (George Macready).

== Cast ==
- Cornel Wilde as Jean Paul
- Constance Smith as Clara MacDougal
- Finlay Currie as MacDougal
- Walter Hampden as Pierre Champlain
- Anne Bancroft as Marie, Comtesse de St. Malo
- George Macready as Marquis de St. Malo
- Fay Wray as Annette, Marquise de St. Malo
- Leo G. Carroll as Raoul Dondel
- Konstantin Shayne as Father Benoit
- House Peters as Magistrate (uncredited)
- Robert Blake as Stable Boy (uncredited)
- May Wynn as Maid (uncredited)
- Harry Cording as Breton (uncredited)

== Reception ==
In The New York Times, film critic Howard Thompson wrote:

Filmed in the splashiest kind of Technicolor amid eye-filling backgrounds, this Jules Buck production stacks up as any respectably wrought adventure romp should--pretty and constantly on the go ... thanks to the crisp pungency of Delmer Daves' script, his own elastic direction and at least two excellent performances by Leo G. Carroll and Mr. Wilde, no less. Also, by way of geographical novelty, the climactic third of the action features an absurd but lusciously scenic treasure hunt in the Mayan sector of Guatemala, filmed on the spot.
