= Cromwell (film) =

1970 British film directed by Ken Hughes

- Theatrical poster by Howard Terpning
- Directed by: Ken Hughes
- Written by: Ken Hughes
- Produced by: Irving Allen
- Starring: Richard Harris; Alec Guinness; Robert Morley; Nigel Stock; Geoffrey Keen; Michael Jayston
- Cinematography: Geoffrey Unsworth
- Edited by: Bill Lenny
- Music by: Frank Cordell
- Production company: Irving Allen Productions
- Distributed by: Columbia Pictures
- Release date: 16 July 1970
- Running time: 140 minutes
- Country: United Kingdom
- Language: English
- Budget: $8 million or £9 million

Cromwell is a 1970 British historical drama film written and directed by Ken Hughes. It is based on the life of Oliver Cromwell, who rose to lead the Parliamentary forces during the later years of the English Civil War and, as Lord Protector, ruled Great Britain and Ireland in the 1650s. It features an ensemble cast, led by Richard Harris as Cromwell and Alec Guinness as King Charles I, with Robert Morley as Edward Montagu, 2nd Earl of Manchester and Timothy Dalton as Prince Rupert of the Rhine.

The film received two Oscar nominations during the 43rd Academy Awards held in 1971, winning one for Best Costume Design by Vittorio Nino Novarese, but also for Best Original Score, composed by Frank Cordell. It was also nominated for a BAFTA Award for Best Costume Design and a Golden Globe Award for Best Original Score. At the 7th Moscow International Film Festival in 1971 it won the award for Best Actor (Richard Harris), and was nominated for the Golden Prize as Best Picture (Ken Hughes). The film received negative reviews for its many historical inaccuracies; however, much praise went to the acting (particularly Harris and Guinness), the score, and the costume design.

== Plot ==
Oliver Cromwell is a devout Puritan, a country squire, magistrate and former Member of Parliament. King Charles I's policies, including the enclosing of common land for the use of wealthy landowners and the introduction of "Romish" rituals into the Church of England, have become increasingly grating to many, including Cromwell. In fact, Charles regards himself as a devout Anglican, permitting his French Queen to practise Roman Catholicism in private but forbidding her to bring up the young Prince of Wales in that faith. Cromwell plans to take his family to the New World, but, on the eve of their departure, he is persuaded to stay and resume a role in politics.

Charles has unenthusiastically summoned Parliament for the first time in twelve years, as he needs money to fight wars against both the Scots and the Irish. Although to appease the Commons he agrees to execute his belligerent adviser, the Earl of Strafford, Parliament will still not grant his requests unless he agrees to reforms that could lead to a constitutional monarchy. Committed to belief in the divine right of kings, and under pressure from his queen to stand firm, Charles refuses. When he enters the parliamentary chamber with an armed guard and attempts to arrest five members of Parliament, war breaks out in England, with those who side with Parliament arming against the King's supporters, both parties convinced that God is on their side.

When the Parliamentary forces in which Cromwell is a cavalry officer prove ineffective at the Battle of Edgehill, he, along with Thomas Fairfax, sets up the New Model Army that eventually turns the tide against the king's forces. The army's discipline and training secure victory at the Battle of Naseby against superior numbers and Cromwell's cavalry proves to be the deciding factor, though one of his sons is killed in battle. The king is eventually encircled in his headquarters at Oxford and has his fervent supporter and nephew, Prince Rupert of the Rhine, banished after he fails to hold the port of Bristol. He is finally defeated in a second conflict after attempting to negotiate for help from Catholic nations with the help of the queen and his eldest son, who are sent abroad for this purpose.

Cromwell later hears from Sir Edward Hyde, the king's once-loyal adviser, of Charles' secret plans to raise a wholly Catholic army to support him, obstinately refusing to give in to the demands of Cromwell and his associates for a system of government in which Parliament will have as much say in the running of the country as the king. Cromwell therefore uses Parliament to have Charles tried for treason. At the resulting trial, the king refuses to recognise any authority higher than his own, but is found guilty and sentenced to death. After a farewell to his younger children, he faces execution bravely. There is little celebration or satisfaction over his death, even on Cromwell's part.

In fact Cromwell has retired moodily to his estate and reacts with anger to a request from his radical colleague Henry Ireton and other Parliamentarians to become king himself. However, Parliament soon proves self-serving in governing the country. Cromwell's troops remove the MPs from the House of Commons, leaving Cromwell sitting symbolically alone in the Chamber as virtual dictator, where he outlines to the viewer his vision for The Protectorate. The film ends with a voice-over stating that Cromwell served very successfully for five years as Lord Protector before Charles I's son returned as king of an England "never to be the same again".

== Cast ==
- Richard Harris as Oliver Cromwell
- Alec Guinness as King Charles
- Robert Morley as the Earl of Manchester
- Dorothy Tutin as Queen Henrietta Maria: wife of Charles I.
- Frank Finlay as John Carter
- Timothy Dalton as Prince Rupert
- Patrick Wymark as the Earl of Strafford
- Patrick Magee as Hugh Peters
- Nigel Stock as Sir Edward Hyde
- Charles Gray as the Earl of Essex
- Michael Jayston as Henry Ireton
- Douglas Wilmer as Thomas Fairfax
- Geoffrey Keen as John Pym
- Stratford Johns as Judge John Bradshaw
- Ian McCulloch as John Hampden
- Patrick O'Connell as John Lilburne
- Anna Cropper as John Carter's wife
- Jack Gwillim as John Byron, 1st Baron Byron
- Anthony May as Richard Cromwell
- Stacy Dorning as Mary Cromwell
- Zena Walker as Elizabeth Cromwell
- John Welsh as Bishop Juxon
- Robin Stewart as Charles, Prince of Wales
- Patrick Holt as Thomas Lunsford

== Production ==
In 1960, Hughes read John Buchan's biography, Oliver Cromwell and more books before touring England and researching from historic sites to museums and archives. In September 1960, Warwick purchased the screen rights to Buchan's book and Hughes was announced as writer and director.

Hughes originally wrote the script in 1961. Richard Harris liked it and wanted to star, but financiers did not consider him a big enough star at the time to finance the film. They wanted Charlton Heston, but Hughes did not think he was appropriate. (Heston wrote in his diaries on 2 November 1961 that he turned down "Warwick's Cromwell script.")

In April 1967, Irving Allen announced that John Briley had rewritten Ken Hughes' script and that Peter Hall was going to direct. Allen hoped to get Paul Scofield to play Charles I and Albert Finney to play Cromwell. Columbia were going to finance with filming to take place the following year. Hughes had tried to get Richard Burton to read the script, but Burton was not interested. Hughes later said he almost succeeded in making the film in 1968, but finance fell through at the last minute.

In February 1969, it was announced Hughes would write and direct for Irving Allen. In April, it was reported Ronald Harwood was working on the script with Ken Hughes. Hughes eventually succeeded in raising the money from Columbia in the US. After $600,000 had been spent, they were tempted to pull out, but changed their mind. The budget started at $6 million and grew to $9 million.

Most of the film was shot in England, and London's Parliament Square was constructed at Shepperton Studios, but the battle scenes were shot in Spain. The original cut went for three hours fifteen minutes, but Hughes cut it down to two hours twenty four minutes. "I think it's the best thing I've ever done," said Hughes in 1970.

== Historical accuracy ==
Although publicity for the film boasted that it had been made "after ten years of research", the film has been criticised for its numerous historical inaccuracies. In its defence, George MacDonald Fraser has written, "Inevitably there are historical queries all the way through, as there are bound to be in a picture which takes its subject seriously and tries to cover so much in less than two and a half hours. The main thrust of Cromwell is true, it gets a great deal of history, and the sense of history, right". Costumes, locations (e.g. the layout of the House of Commons) and the appearance of actors were generally accurate but as in many historical films – as much as for practical film making purposes as anything else – liberties were taken with the course of events.

Film Depiction	Reality
It seriously exaggerates Cromwell's role in the events leading up to the outbreak of the English Civil War, suggesting that he and Ireton were among the five members of Parliament whom the king tried to arrest when he entered the House of Commons and that Cromwell stayed in his seat and defied the king.	The Five Members were John Pym, John Hampden, Denzil Holles, William Strode and Sir Arthur Haselrig. Charles' occupation of the Speaker's chair, signalling his sovereignty over Parliament and quip that "the birds have flown" are genuine, as is Speaker Lenthall's claim that he had neither eyes to see nor tongue to speak save as the Commons directed him.
Cromwell is shown as a colonel at the Battle of Edgehill in 1642.	At the time he was only a captain, becoming a colonel in 1643. He was not present at the battle, turning up with his troop too late in the evening.
The famous soldiers' prayer: "O Lord, Thou knowest how busy I must be this day. If I forget Thee, do not Thou forget me" is put into Cromwell's mouth.	In fact, the prayer came from Sir Jacob Astley, a Royalist.
Prince Rupert's white hunting poodle Boy is seen being carried by him before the Battle of Naseby.	Boy was killed a year earlier during the Battle of Marston Moor.
Cromwell's son Oliver is depicted as having been killed during the Battle of Naseby in June 1645. Towards the end of the film, the elder Oliver is seen at his son's gravestone which clearly shows the year of death as 1644.	The younger Oliver Cromwell died of smallpox during the spring of 1644 while in garrison at Newport Pagnell. However this was likely not an intentional change as several older biographies contend that Oliver was killed in a skirmish, in particular Thomas Carlyle, and it was from the discovery of Richard's letters that historians learned that Oliver Jr died of smallpox. The only real deliberate fictionalization is that he was killed specifically during Naseby.
Cromwell angrily declares to the Parliamentary generals that he is going home to raise a new army from his own people. Later this is referred to as "Cromwell's army". Cromwell is commander-in-chief of the Parliamentary forces, while Sir Thomas Fairfax is shown as Cromwell's subordinate, for instance during the Battle of Naseby.	In fact, the New Model Army was created by the Parliament as a national force and was specifically intended to replace the inefficient local armies that powerful local magnates had created. Thomas Fairfax was appointed "Lord Generall" (commander-in-chief) of the Army during the early English Civil War; notably he commanded the Parliamentary forces at Naseby. Cromwell—one of the few politicians to retain a military command when the New Model Army was formed—was "Lieutenant-General", second-in-command, and commander of the cavalry. He commanded the Parliamentary right-wing cavalry at Naseby.
Cromwell enters Oxford and personally arrests the king in the name of Parliament.	At the end of the First Civil War the king surrendered to the Scottish army and was only put in the custody of the English Parliament sometime later. He was then seized by New Model troops led by Cornet Joyce some time after that.
Sir Thomas Fairfax is shown as present as a judge at the king's trial.	He did turn up for the first day of the trial but absented himself after this.
Cromwell is the first one to sign Charles' death warrant after Fairfax refuses to.	Fairfax did refuse to sign the warrant; Cromwell was the third to sign, after Bradshaw and Lord Grey of Groby.
Cromwell dismisses the idea of becoming king instantly, laughing it off as absurd after what he fought for.	Cromwell was immediately reluctant to accept the office of king, but took the offer very seriously as so many in Parliament thought it vital. He refused the offer after several weeks of negotiations, mainly because the army was opposed to it.
The film gives the impression that Cromwell spent the inter-war years on his farm and lands in Huntingdon.	In fact, he had been overseeing the subjugation of Ireland and the Anglo-Scottish war, both of which go unmentioned in the film. It was before the latter campaign that Cromwell succeeded Fairfax as Lord General.
The enclosures of common lands appear early in the film as a source of Cromwell's discontent.	Charles I was noted for being an anti-enclosure reformer, though he did pursue some enclosures to raise revenues during his personal reign.
Both the Earl of Essex (Parliamentary commander-in-chief in the early years of the war) and the Earl of Manchester are shown as sitting in Cromwell's presence in the House of Commons. The Earl of Essex and Lord (Thomas) Fairfax are shown to be present in the last scene when Cromwell dissolves the Rump Parliament six years after the execution of Charles I. Fairfax is shown as part of a plot to prevent members of the Rump Parliament from having to face re-elections.	Essex and Manchester would actually have sat in the House of Lords, but in any case the Earl of Essex died in 1646. Fairfax had largely retired from public life some years ago after a falling-out with Cromwell over invading Scotland, and was not involved with offers to Cromwell or Parliamentary motions in the House of Commons.

There was also another instance of a figure shown as being alive, well after their historical death:- Henry Ireton is shown heading the parliamentary deputation who offer Cromwell the Crown. Parliament's offer happened in 1657, by which time Ireton had been dead for 6 years. Furthermore, the scene suggests a personal falling-out between the two men, who in reality were particularly close (Ireton was Cromwell's son-in-law).

== Release ==
=== Home media ===
Cromwell was released in 2017 on Blu-ray in Germany and 2020 in France. Still not released on Blu-ray in the US, UK or other English speaking countries, but available digitally on online platforms, e.g. Amazon and iTunes.

== Reception ==
=== Critical ===
The film was generally received unfavourably, with criticism of the historical inaccuracies; however the performances of its two leads, production values and score were praised.

FilmInk said the film "does have some good things about it: Alec Guinness is superb as Charles I, and the production design is amazing. But it's dull. So dull. Every time Richard Harris walks on screen he looks as though he's about to give a speech and he does."

=== Box-office ===
The film was one of the most popular movies in 1970 at the British box-office.

=== Awards and nominations ===
Award	Category	Nominee(s)	Result
Academy Awards	Best Costume Design	Vittorio Nino Novarese	Won
Academy Awards	Best Original Score	Frank Cordell	Nominated
British Academy Film Awards	Best Costume Design	Vittorio Nino Novarese	Nominated
Fotogramas de Plata	Best Foreign Movie Performer	Richard Harris	5th Place
Golden Globe Awards	Best Original Score	Frank Cordell	Nominated
Moscow International Film Festival	Golden Prize	Ken Hughes	Nominated
Moscow International Film Festival	Best Actor	Richard Harris	Won

== See also ==
- List of American films of 1970
