= Battle Beneath the Earth =

1967 British film by Montgomery Tully

- Directed by: Montgomery Tully
- Written by: Charles F. Vetter
- Produced by: Charles Reynolds; Charles F. Vetter
- Starring: Kerwin Mathews; Robert Ayres; Peter Arne; Al Mulock
- Cinematography: Kenneth Talbot
- Edited by: Sidney Stone
- Music by: Ken Jones
- Distributed by: Metro-Goldwyn-Mayer
- Release dates: October 1967 (UK); 15 May 1968 (U.S.)
- Running time: 91 minutes
- Country: United Kingdom
- Language: English
- Budget: £156,307

Battle Beneath the Earth is a 1967 British sci-fi thriller film directed by Montgomery Tully and starring Kerwin Mathews. It was written and produced by Charles F. Vetter and released by Metro-Goldwyn-Mayer.

== Plot ==
Scientist Arnold Kramer believes that rogue elements of the communist Chinese Army headed by fanatic General Chan Lu are using advanced burrowing machines in an effort to conquer the U.S. by placing atomic bombs under major cities. In the opening, Las Vegas police are called to a report that Dr. Kramer is lying on a sidewalk, telling people he hears movement beneath him.

The bombs are in tunnels dug from China through the Hawaiian islands to the United States. In the expected war, 100 million people are forecast to die. Kramer is committed to an asylum, but when he is visited by U.S. Navy Commander Jonathan Shaw, what he tells him lines up with observations Shaw has made himself. Shaw gets Kramer released and produces enough evidence to convince his superiors that the story is true, and he is ordered to lead troops underground to defeat the Red Army and defuse the bombs.

The U.S. Army detonates nuclear bombs in a tunnel in Hawaii. The detonations are reported to have stopped all activity in the tunnels.

== Cast ==
- Kerwin Mathews as Cmdr. Jonathan Shaw
- Viviane Ventura as Tila Yung
- Robert Ayres as Adm. Felix Hillebrand
- Peter Arne as Arnold Kramer
- Al Mulock as Sgt. Marvin Mulberry
- Martin Benson as Gen. Chan Lu
- Peter Elliott as Dr. Kengh Lee
- Earl Cameron as Sgt. Seth Hawkins
- John Brandon as Maj. Frank Cannon
- Ed Bishop as Lt. Cmdr. Vance Cassidy
- Carl Jaffe as Dr. Galissi
- Garrick Hobson as Professor Blackthorne
- Sarah Brackett as Meg Webson
- Bee Duffell as Matron's friend
- Chela Matthison as nurse
- Burnell Tucker as Jack Ambridge

== Music ==
The film features a fast-paced "crime-jazz" / jazz-noir musical score by Ken Jones.

== Release ==
The film released to DVD by Warner Home Video on 29 July 2008.

== Critical reception ==
The Monthly Film Bulletin wrote: "Schoolboy comic-strip capers, involving subterranean constructions, hydroponic farms ("enforced growth under solaric light" the Chinese scientist explains), laser beams, nuclear bombs and sinister Oriental villains. Nothing is quite so fanciful, though, as the finale, in which hero and heroine, with only ten minutes to run to safety after setting off an atom bomb, emerge in a volcano and stand looking at the glare of the nuclear explosion with not even a blink of their unshielded eyes. Delightfully nonsensical, the film is at least a variation on the usual SF themes, and very properly everyone acts with deadpan solemnity."

Kine Weekly wrote: "Schoolboy adventure material, this will pass with all but stuffy audiences. Reliable half of a double programme."

The film has been described as "deliriously paranoid".
