= The Viscount (film) =

- Directed by: Maurice Cloche
- Written by: Jean Bruce (novel); Georges Farrel; Luis Marquina; Clarke Reynolds
- Produced by: Nat Wachsberger
- Starring: Kerwin Mathews; Sylvia Sorrente; Jean Yanne
- Cinematography: Henri Raichi
- Edited by: Raymond Leboursier; Antonio Ramírez de Loaysa
- Music by: Georges Garvarentz
- Production companies: Compagnia Cinematografica Mondiale; Critérion Film; Franca Film; Producciones Cinematográficas D.I.A. Senior Cinematografica
- Distributed by: Lux Film (France); Italcid (Italy); Radio Films (Spain); Warner Bros. Pictures (US)
- Release date: 5 April 1967
- Running time: 98 minutes
- Countries: France; Italy; Spain
- Language: French

The Viscount (French: Le vicomte règle ses comptes) is a 1967 crime film directed by Maurice Cloche and starring Kerwin Mathews, Sylvia Sorrente and Jean Yanne. The film's sets were designed by the art director Jean Douarinou. It was made as a co-production between France, Italy and Spain. Warner Bros. Pictures distributed the film in Britain and America.

Location shooting took place around Málaga, Sicily and Paris.

== Cast ==
- Kerwin Mathews as Clint de la Roche, le Vicomte
- Sylvia Sorrente as Lili Dumont
- Jean Yanne as Billette
- Fernando Rey as Marco Demoygne
- Franco Fabrizi as Ramon
- Maria Latour as Tania
- Alain Saury as Vincento
- Armand Mestral as Claude Peroux
- Luis Dávila as Steve Heller
- Álvaro de Luna as Jean
- Pierre Massimi as Louis
- Christian Kerville as Paul
- Claude Le Lorrain
- Olga Bergamonti
- Pepe Martín as Manuel
- Yvette Lebon as Claudia
- Folco Lulli as Rico Barone

== Bibliography ==
- Alfred Krawc. International Directory of Cinematographers, Set- and Costume Designers in Film: France (from the beginnings to 1980). Saur, 1983.
