= Man on a String =

1960 film by André de Toth

- film poster
- Directed by: André De Toth (as Andre De Toth)
- Screenplay by: John Kafka; Virginia Shaler
- Based on: My Ten Years as a Counterspy by Boris Morros with Charles Samuels
- Produced by: Louis de Rochemont
- Starring: Ernest Borgnine; Kerwin Mathews
- Cinematography: Albert Benitz; Charles Lawton Jr.; Pierre Pioncarde; Gayne Rescher
- Edited by: Al Clark
- Music by: George Duning
- Color process: Black and white
- Production company: RD-DR Productions
- Distributed by: Columbia Pictures
- Release date: May 20, 1960
- Running time: 93 minutes
- Country: United States
- Language: English

Man on a String (also known as Confessions of a Counterspy) is a 1960 American spy thriller directed by Andre de Toth and starring Ernest Borgnine and Kerwin Mathews. It was the last film that DeToth directed in the United States.

== Plot ==
A government intelligence agency in Washington, D.C. wants agent Frank Sanford to follow Boris Mitrov, a film producer who appears to also be a Russian spy. Helen and Adrian Benson, a wealthy American couple with a home in Beverly Hills and a film studio, are communist sympathizers as well, in league with Colonel Vadja Kubelov, the top KGB man in the U.S.

Boris's office is bugged by his assistant, Bob Avery, a plant who is working for the Americans. Now that he has been caught red-handed, Boris is willing to turn double agent, going to Berlin under the pretense of making a documentary film there.

Helen is having an affair with Kubelov, but the Bensons' home has been bugged and they try to flee to Mexico. In the meantime, Boris is sent to Moscow to be entrusted with a new assignment, so Avery gives him a code word ("cinerama") to use should he find himself in danger.

Upon learning that Adrian intends to publicly expose Boris and Kubelov, Avery is able to alert Boris to return to Germany as soon as possible. A checkpoint is closed, but Boris shoots a police officer and escapes safely to West Berlin, only to end up in a fight for his life with a Russian assassin.

== Cast ==
- Ernest Borgnine as Boris Mitrov
- Kerwin Mathews as Bob Avery
- Colleen Dewhurst as Helen Benson
- Alexander Scourby as Vadja Kubelov
- Glenn Corbett as Frank Sanford
- Vladimir Sokoloff as Papa
- Friedrich Joloff as Nikolai Chapayev
- Richard Kendrick as Inspector Jenkins
- Ed Prentiss as Adrian Benson
- Clete Roberts as Narrator

== Reception ==
Stanley Kauffmann of The New Republic wrote: "The dialogue and characterizations in this picture cripple the putative truth of the message it intends to deliver. This Grade C melodrama may exist in life, but that is insufficient excuse for it in art."

== Home media ==
Man on a String was released on DVD by Sony Pictures Home Entertainment on March 4, 2011, via its DVD-on-demand system available through Amazon.

== See also ==
- List of American films of 1960
