= Impulse (1954 film) =

British film noir by Cy Endfield

- Theatrical release poster
- Directed by: Cy Endfield (as Charles de Lautour)
- Written by: Cy Endfield (as Jonathan Roach); Lawrence Huntington
- Story by: Carl Nystrom; Robert S. Baker
- Produced by: Robert S. Baker; Monty Berman
- Starring: Arthur Kennedy; Constance Smith; Joy Shelton
- Cinematography: Jonah Jones
- Edited by: Jack Slade
- Music by: Stanley Black
- Production company: Tempean Films
- Distributed by: Eros Films
- Release date: 1954
- Running time: 81 minutes
- Country: United Kingdom
- Language: English

Impulse is a 1954 British second feature film noir directed by Cy Endfield (as "Charles de Lautour") and starring Arthur Kennedy, Constance Smith and Joy Shelton. It was written by Endfield (as "Jonathan Roach") and Lawrence Huntington from an original story by Carl Nystrom and Robert S. Baker.

== Plot ==
Alan Curtis is an American estate agent living in England, dissatisfied with his humdrum life. With his wife Elizabeth on a short break visiting her mother, he gives a lift to sultry nightclub singer Lila when he finds her stranded on the road at night. Curtis becomes romantically involved with her and Lila tells him that her brother is in trouble over a jewel robbery.

In reality Lila wants the stolen stones for herself. She tricks the wayward Curtis into believing that he killed a man so that he buys them two tickets out of the country. He decides that it is better to face the music, opting to stay and confess. Lila, too, reconsiders, staying with Curtis until his name is cleared. After the true killers are revealed, Lila goes to jail as a participant in the robbery and Curtis returns to his wife, who forgives him.

== Cast ==
- Arthur Kennedy as Alan Curtis
- Constance Smith as Lila
- Joy Shelton as Elizabeth Curtis
- Jack Allen as Freddie
- James Carney as Jack Forrester
- Cyril Chamberlain as Gray
- Cameron Hall as Joe
- Bruce Beeby as Harry Winters
- Charles Lamb as Palmer
- Sam Kydd as ticket inspector
- Kenneth Cope as hotel desk clerk
- Michael Balfour as sailor
- John Horsley as police officer
- Peter Swanwick as ship's captain
- Victor Harrington as nightclub patron
- Guy Standeven as nightclub patron
- Jean St Clair as Curtis' next-door neighbour

== Production ==
The film was shot at Nettlefold Studios, Walton-on-Thames, Surrey, with sets designed by art director Wilfred Arnold.

Endfield had come to work in Britain to escape the Hollywood blacklist. In order for him to direct, the Association of Cine Technicians (ACT) required that a paid ACT "dummy" director be appointed, to do nothing on set, but to be credited with direction; Endfield chose documentary filmmaker Charles de Lautour, whom he paid £35 a week.

== Critical reception ==
Monthly Film Bulletin said "Characteristic British crime melodrama. The story is by no means completely convincing, but is made reasonably credible by a standard of acting somewhat above the average for a production of this type."

Film historians Steve Chibnall and Brian McFarlane praised Kennedy's performance and said "This detailed and un-showy study of a man tempted away from a comfortable but dull rut is one of the subtlest to be found in the 'B' film ranks."

In British Sound Films: The Studio Years 1928–1959 David Quinlan rated the film as "average", writing: "Ordinary thriller at least keeps you guessing."

The Radio Times Guide to Films gave the film 2/5 stars, writing: "This is a routine British second-feature, although Arthur Kennedy is a cut above the average imported American lead. Kennedy has a fling with nightclub singer Constance Smith, who involves him in a crime. Screenwriter "Jonathan Roach" is actually Cy Endfield, taking refuge in the UK from the McCarthy witch-hunts, while Charles de Lautour took credit for Endfield as director."
