= Quay of Illusions =

1959 film

- Directed by: Émile Couzinet
- Written by: Émile Couzinet
- Produced by: Émile Couzinet
- Starring: Gaby Morlay; Louis Seigner; Lise Bourdin
- Cinematography: Pierre Dolley
- Edited by: Émile Couzinet
- Music by: Joseph Kosma
- Production companies: Burgus Films; Rivo Film
- Distributed by: Comptoir Français du Film
- Release date: 21 January 1959
- Running time: 85 minutes
- Countries: France; Italy
- Language: French

Quay of Illusions (French: Quai des illusions) is a 1959 French-Italian drama film directed by Émile Couzinet and starring Gaby Morlay, Louis Seigner and Lise Bourdin. The film's sets were designed by the art director René Renneteau.

== Synopsis ==
Lise is bored living at her parents house and leaves to work as a waitress by the waterfront. She meets Lise, a sailor, and falls pregnant with his child. He runs away to evade the police and she soon afterwards gives birth but loses the baby. Distraught she then steals a child from a maternity ward.

== Cast ==
- Gaby Morlay as Mme. Vincent
- Louis Seigner as Monsieur Vincent
- Lise Bourdin as Lise Vincent
- Fausto Tozzi as Fausto
- Georgette Anys as La patronne de La Sirène
- Henri Arius as Le patron de La Sirène
- Olivier Mathot
- Colette Fleury
- Anne-Marie Mersen
- Piero Giagnoni
- Jacques Varennes
- Alexandre Rignault

== Bibliography ==
- Rège, Philippe. Encyclopedia of French Film Directors, Volume 1. Scarecrow Press, 2009.
