= Shadow of Evil =

Banco à Bangkok pour OSS 117
- French theatrical release poster
- Directed by: André Hunebelle
- Screenplay by: Pierre Foucaud; Michel Lebrun; André Hunebelle
- Story by: Jean Bruce
- Produced by: Paul Cadéac
- Starring: Kerwin Mathews; Pier Angeli; Robert Hossein; Dominique Wilms
- Cinematography: Raymond Lemoigne
- Edited by: Jean Feyte
- Music by: Michel Magne
- Production companies: Production Artistique Cinématographique; Da.Ma. Cinematografica
- Distributed by: SN Prodis
- Release date: June 1964
- Running time: 118 minutes
- Country: France
- Language: French

Banco à Bangkok pour OSS 117, released in the USA as Shadow of Evil, is a 1964 French/Italian international co-production Eurospy spy-fi film. It was based on Jean Bruce's 1960 novel Lila de Calcutta, the 74th OSS 117 novel. It was the second OSS 117 film directed by André Hunebelle and produced by Paul Cadéac, the first in the series in colour, the first co-produced by the Italian company Da.Ma. Cinematografica and the last to star Kerwin Mathews as OSS 117.

The film was shot on Thai locations and featured action scenes arranged by Hunebelle's stunt coordinator Claude Carliez with production design by René Moulaert.

== Plot ==
Secret Agent OSS 117, Colonel Hubert Bonisseur de La Bath (Kerwin Mathews) is sent to Thailand following the murder of OSS agent Christopher Lemmon. Lemmon had been investigating the break out of plague epidemics in India following health workers inoculating the locals to protect them from cholera. Lemmon had discovered that the medicine made in Hogby Laboratories in Bangkok had been switched with plague germs infecting the population with fatal results.

After surviving several assassination attempts, OSS 117 infiltrates the secret lair of Dr. Sinn (Robert Hossein), an Indian hypnotist and psychologist with the help of his sister Lila (Pier Angeli). Dr Sinn is the cape wearing supervillain and mastermind mad scientist of a Malthusian organisation known as the "People Elect". The "People Elect" (inoculated by Dr Sinn for immunity) desire to spread plague around the world to reduce the Earth's population and stop atomic testing that is ruining the planet.

== Cast ==
- Kerwin Mathews as Hubert Bonisseur de La Bath
- Pier Angeli as Lila Sinn, the doctor's sister
- Robert Hossein as Dr Sinn
- Dominique Wilms as Eva Davidson, Leacock's secretary
- Gamil Ratib as Akhom
- Henri Virlojeux as Leacock
- Jacques Mauclair as Mr Smith
- Henri Guégan as Karloff
- Raoul Billerey as Christopher Lemmon
- Jacques Hilling as Hogby
