= Charles Samuels (writer) =

American novelist

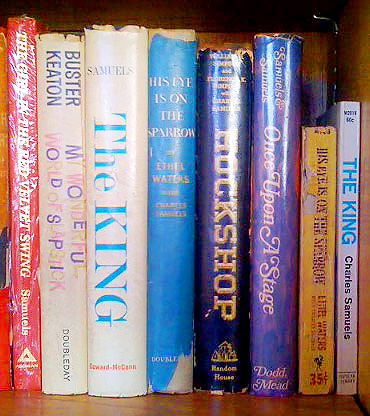
some books by Charles Samuels

Charles Samuels (September 15, 1902, in Brooklyn, New York – April 27, 1982, in Cuernavaca, Morelos, Mexico) was an American journalist, and writer best known for his biographies of celebrities, He penned as-told-to autobiographies for Buster Keaton (My Wonderful World of Slapstick) and Ethel Waters (His Eye is on the Sparrow) which was a best seller. Among his other books were Magnificent Rube: The Life and Gaudy Times of Tex Rickard and The King: A Biography of Clark Gable.

Samuels began his career as a sports and feature writer with the Brooklyn Eagle in 1923.

His book with Boris Morros, My Ten Years as a Counterspy was made into the film, Man on a String (1960), starring Ernest Borgnine. The title of another, The Girl in the Red Velvet Swing, about Evelyn Nesbit, was used in the 1955 movie. He was the recipient of the Edgar Allan Poe award (now called the Edgar Award) in 1957 for Night Fell on Georgia (written with his wife Louise Samuels).

Samuels, who wrote thousands of magazine and newspaper articles, also helped write the newspaper columns of Ben Hecht and Billy Rose. He was the New York City Editor of Paramount News.

He lived mostly in New York City and its suburbs Hastings-on-Hudson, Nyack, New York, and Grand View, New York, where he was the director for the Rockland Foundation (now the Rockland Center for the Arts) and retired in Cuernavaca, Mexico. His son Robert C. Samuels was a journalist and writer.

== Works ==
Writings by the author

- The Frantic Young Man (novel), Coward, 1929.
- A Rather Simple Fellow (novel), Coward, 1931.
- The Girl in the Red Velvet Swing, Gold Medal, 1953.
- The Girl in the House of Hate' (with Louise Samuels), Gold Medal, 1953.
- Death Was the Bridegroom, Gold Medal, 1953.
- Night Fell on Georgia (with Louise Samuels), Dell, Edgar Allan Poe Award, 1956. (about the Leo Frank case)
- The Magnificent Rube: The Life and Gaudy Times of Tex Rickard (biography), McGraw, 1957.
- The King: The Biography of Clark Gable, Coward, 1962 (published in England as The King of Hollywood: The Story of Clark Gable, Allen & Unwin, 1962).
- Only One New York : The Unknown Worlds of the Great City, (photographs by Jan Yoors) Simon & Schuster, 1965.
- Once upon a Stage: The Merry World of Vaudeville (with L. Samuels), Dodd, 1974.

As-told-to biographies

- His Eye Is on the Sparrow (with Ethel Waters), Doubleday, 1951, published with a new preface by Donald Bogle, Da Capo Press( New York City), 1992.
- Lady on the Beach (with Norah Berg), Prentice-Hall, 1952.
- Hockshop (with William R. and Florence K. Simpson), Random House, 1954.
- My Ten Years as a Counterspy (with Boris Morros), Viking, 1959.
- My Wonderful World of Slapstick (with Buster Keaton), Doubleday, 1960, published with a new introduction by Dwight Macdonald and a new filmography compiled by Raymond Rohauer, Da Capo Press, 1982.
- How to Catch 5,000 Thieves (with Gerard Luisi), Macmillan, 1962.

== Quote ==
Samuels never graduated from high school or lost his Brooklyn accent. "I never wanted to be anything but a writer, have talent for nothing else except fast, furious, and occasionally witty conversation. I wouldn't trade my memories for anyone's," he told an interviewer.
