= Paul Baxley =

American stunt coordinator (1923–2011)

- Born: September 24, 1923
- Died: March 4, 2011 (aged 87)

Paul Reginald Baxley Jr. (September 24, 1923 – March 4, 2011) was an American actor and stunt coordinator best known for his work as a stunt coordinator on Star Trek: The Original Series. He was a stunt double of William Shatner.

== Early life ==
Baxley was born in Casper, Wyoming and grew up in Los Angeles. Through his high school years at Eagle Rock High, he was a quarterback and track star. He was a Marine Scout Sniper in the 4th division during World War II. His service earned him two Purple Hearts, a gold star, a letter of commendation, and a presidential citation. He went back to college and continued his career as a quarterback. He met one of the most successful stunt coordinators in the film industry, stuntman Richard Talmadge in the late 1940s and was brought into the stunt community. By 1947, Baxley was performing stunts in films such as Deep Valley (1947), Pirates of Monterey (1947), The Lady from Shanghai (1947), The Black Arrow (1948) and Comanche Territory (1950).

== Career ==
After being introduced to the stunt community by Richard Talmadge, Baxley's career took off. He worked on West Point Story, The Son of Dr. Jekyll, The Crimson Pirate, Iron Mistress, Shane, The Black Knight, and Rebel Without a Cause. He also worked on television on Star Trek and Mike Hammer. In Star Trek he was William Shatner's stunt double but also performed stunts as a background player and for other guest stars. Baxley was probably best known for his work on the series The Dukes of Hazzard, which he worked on from 1979 until 1985, giving him seven years and 120 episodes as the stunt coordinator.

Baxley doubled for several important Hollywood actors, such as Marlon Brando, Alan Ladd, and James Dean. After doubling for Brando, Paul Baxley became close friends with him. They remained friends until Brando's death in 2004.

== Later years/death ==
Baxley's son, Craig, became a stunt coordinator, along with his nephew, Gary Baxley. His grandson, Craig Baxley Jr. became a member of Stunts Unlimited. Later in Paul Baxley's career, he directed several episodes of T.H.E. Cat and The Dukes of Hazzard. He also worked as his son's stunt coordinator and second unit director.

Paul Baxley died on March 4, 2011, in Palmdale, California, aged 87.

== Partial filmography ==
- Diamonds Are Forever (1971) - CIA Agent (uncredited)
- The Boy Who Cried Werewolf (1973) - First Werewolf
