= Constance Smith =

Irish actress (1929–2003)

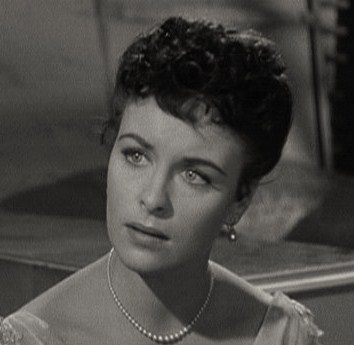
- Born: 7 February 1929; Limerick, Ireland
- Died: 30 June 2003 (aged 74); Islington, London, England
- Occupation: Actress
- Years active: 1947–1959
- Spouses: Bryan Forbes (m. 1951; div. 1955) Araldo de Crollalanza (m. 1956, annulled) Paul Rotha (m. 1974; div. 1978)

Constance Smith (7 February 1929 – 30 June 2003) was an Irish film actress, and contract player of 20th Century Fox in the 1950s.

== Early life ==
Smith was born into a family as the first of eleven children. Her father was an infantryman, working for the Irish Army, and he died when Constance was a child. Her mother was not able to support all her children and Constance was sent to a convent. When Smith won a Dublin beauty contest at age sixteen to find the girl who looked most like Hedy Lamarr, Smith's mother sent the photo to a film studio. As a result, Smith won a screen test, and although reluctant to seize the opportunity, she was pushed into the film industry by her mother, according to the actress.

== Career ==
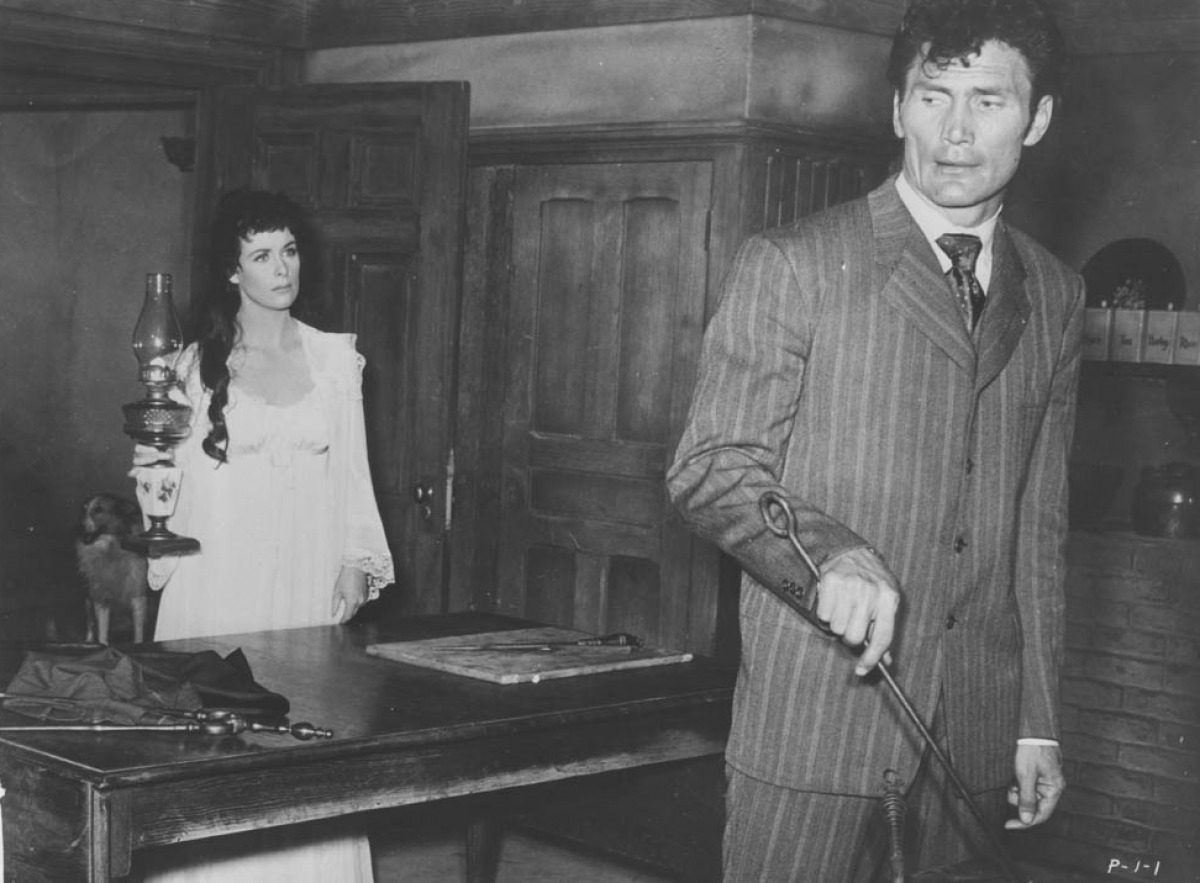
Smith and Jack Palance in a screenshot from Man in the Attic (1953)

Smith moved to London, where she briefly joined the Rank Organisation. Studio executives were unamused by Smith's attitude, and she was eventually sacked before she made her breakthrough. She moved back to London, studied acting and played bit parts in several British B films. She had an uncredited role as a singer in the 1948 film noir Brighton Rock. In 1950, she was first noticed after playing an Irish maid in The Mudlark. Impressed with her performance, 20th Century Fox offered her a contract. Upon her arrival in Hollywood, producer Darryl F. Zanuck cast her opposite Tyrone Power in I'll Never Forget You (1951). However, he soon decided Smith was not experienced enough and replaced her with Ann Blyth.

She was most active in the 1950s, appearing in Hollywood features such as Man in the Attic and Treasure of the Golden Condor (1953) and Impulse (1954). Smith was a presenter at the Academy Awards ceremony in 1952.

By the time her contract expired in 1953, Smith had undergone an abortion and the first of her three marriages was on the ropes. As the years went on and Smith failed to get the parts she felt were commensurate with her abilities, she began an embittered descent into a life of drugs and alcohol. Smith last acted in a run of minor films made in Italy between 1955 and 1959, including a role as Lucretia Borgia in La congiura dei Borgia (1959). None of these did anything to resuscitate her failing career. During her time in Rome, she first attempted suicide by overdosing on barbiturates.

She made her last film appearance in 1959.

== Personal life ==
Smith married English film director Bryan Forbes in 1951; they divorced in 1955. In 1962 she was sentenced to three months in prison for stabbing her boyfriend, the documentary maker and film historian Paul Rotha. On 4 February 1968, she stabbed Rotha for the second time and was charged with attempted murder. She and Rotha married in 1974, and broke up in 1978. Smith tried several times again to kill herself. Her last decades were spent, dissipated, in and out of hospitals. During intermittent periods of recovery, she worked as a cleaner.

== Death ==
Smith died of natural causes on 30 June 2003 in Islington, London. She was 74.

== Legacy ==
In 2018 her life was documented in "Constance Smith - Hollywood Tragedy" for TG4. In 2025, she was portrayed by Pom Boyd in a play "Connie", directed by Ann Blake, produced by Joanne Ryan and researched by Sharon Slater was performed in the Theatre Royal, Cecil Street, Limerick. That same year, Limerick artist Mary Conroy designed a Hollywood Star for Constance cast in bronze and installed in Limerick's People Park; the first piece of permanent public art for any woman in Limerick City.

== Partial filmography ==
- Jassy (1947) – Young Lady (uncredited)
- Brighton Rock (1948) – Singer (uncredited)
- Easy Money (1948) – Wilson's Secretary (segment The Atkins Story) (uncredited)
- The Calendar (1948) – Airport Attendant (uncredited)
- To the Public Danger (1948, Short) – Girl in pub watching billiards game (uncredited)
- Murder at the Windmill (1949) – Cloakroom Girl
- The Perfect Woman (1949) – Receptionist
- Now Barabbas (1949) – Jean
- Trottie True (1949) – Gaiety Girl (uncredited)
- Room to Let (1950) – Molly Musgrave
- The Mudlark (1950) – Kate Noonan
- Don't Say Die (1950) – Red Biddy
- The 13th Letter (1951) – Cora Laurent
- Blackmailed (1951) – Nurse Anne
- I'll Get You for This (1951) – Nina
- Red Skies of Montana (1952) – Peg Mason
- Lure of the Wilderness (1952) – Noreen McGowan
- Taxi (1953) – Mary Turner
- Treasure of the Golden Condor (1953) – Clara MacDougal
- Man in the Attic (1953) – Lily Bonner
- Tiger by the Tail (1954) – Jane Claymore
- Impulse (1954) – Laila
- The Big Tip Off (1955) – Penny Conroy
- Un po' di cielo (1955) – Nora
- The Violent Patriot (1956) – Emma Caldana
- Addio per sempre! (1958) – Lucia
- Conspiracy of the Borgias (1959) – Lucrezia Borgia
- Knight Without a Country (1959) – Laura (final film role)

== Radio appearances ==
Year	Program	Episode/source
1953	Radio Theater	Taxi
