= Children of Love =

1953 film

- Directed by: Léonide Moguy
- Written by: Léonide Moguy; Marise Querlin
- Produced by: Ayres d'Aguiar
- Starring: Etchika Choureau; Joëlle Bernard; Lise Bourdin
- Cinematography: Robert Juillard
- Edited by: Louisette Hautecoeur
- Music by: Joseph Kosma
- Production company: Gray-Film
- Distributed by: Cocinor
- Release date: 10 November 1953
- Running time: 95 minutes
- Country: France
- Language: French
- Box office: $27.1 million

Children of Love (French: Les enfants de l'amour) is a 1953 French drama film directed by Léonide Moguy and starring Etchika Choureau, Joëlle Bernard and Lise Bourdin. The film's sets were designed by the art director Rino Mondellini.

== Synopsis ==
In a maternity hospital, the social worker Hélène Lambert and Doctor Baurain attempt to help a group of new, single mothers cope with the dilemmas of raising their children or giving them up for adoption.

== Cast ==
- Etchika Choureau as Anne-Marie et Geneviève
- Joëlle Bernard as Dolly
- Lise Bourdin as Hélène Lambert
- Jean-Claude Pascal as Doctor Baurain
- Jean-Max as President Martichou
- Maryse Martin as Madeleine
- Dominique Page as Liliane
- Jean-Pierre Jaubert as Roger Dubois
- Mylène Demongeot as Nicole
- Nadine Tallier as Lulu
- Janine Darcey as A future mother
- Marcelle Arnold as A woman who want to adopt a children
- Robert Vattier as Albert
- Raymond Cordy as The policier
- Paul Azaïs as M. Lefranc
- Philippe Hersent as Inspector Gaultier
- Georges Galley as Vittorio
- Marcel Pérès as M. Landrieu
- Héléna Manson as Mlle Lefort
- Lucienne Bogaert as La Donnadieu
- Germaine Dermoz as Nicole's mother
- Valentine Tessier as The director

== Bibliography ==
- Oscherwitz, Dayna; Higgins, MaryEllen (2009). "DEMONGEOT, MYLÈNE (1936– )". The A to Z of French Cinema. Scarecrow Press. pp. 129–130. ISBN 978-0-8108-7038-3.
