= The Last Blitzkrieg =

1959 film by Arthur Dreifuss

- Original film poster
- Directed by: Arthur Dreifuss
- Written by: Lou Morheim
- Produced by: Sam Katzman
- Starring: Van Johnson; Dick York; Kerwin Mathews
- Narrated by: Dick York
- Cinematography: Edward Scaife
- Music by: Hugo de Groot
- Production company: Clover Productions
- Distributed by: Columbia Pictures
- Release date: January 30, 1959 (New York City)
- Running time: 85 minutes
- Country: United States
- Language: English

The Last Blitzkrieg is a 1959 American war film directed Arthur Dreifuss and filmed at Veluwe and the Cinetone Studios in Amsterdam for a Columbia Pictures release.

The film is a fictional account of Operation Greif during the Battle of the Bulge, where German commandos attempted to capture several bridges on the Meuse while disguised as Allied personnel. Columbia contract stars Dick York and Kerwin Mathews also star in the film. Technical advisor to the film was Major John W. McClain who was a company commander with the 23rd Infantry. A novelisation of the screenplay was written by Walter Freeman.

== Plot ==
In late 1944, several American prisoners plan an escape from a German prisoner-of-war camp. However, unknown to them, among them is a German, Lt. Hans von Kroner, known to them as Sgt. Richardson, who is spying on the prisoners, reporting their escape plans to the camp commandant and polishing up his American English. Reporting the escape plan to the camp commandant, von Kroner is told he is being removed from the camp and reassigned to another unit as part of a top secret project gathering all fluent English-speaking members of the Wehrmacht for an unstated reason. The prisoners' plan fails and many die.

Von Kroner is sent to a German castle with others for Operation Greif (called "Operation OK Butch" in the film), where they will dress in U.S. Army uniforms and spearhead the Ardennes Offensive by committing sabotage, interdicting supply lines and seizing key objectives for the attacking German forces. Assisting in the training, von Kroner is assigned a team of three other men with various skills, including a Waffen SS Officer, Wilitz, who regales his comrades with stories of his exploits in terrorizing unfortunates whilst a member of the Brown Shirts.

Von Kroner's team's activities and the initial German assault meet with success, but both soon run into unexpected difficulty. Von Kroner's forged orders are countermanded by a decimated American infantry company of the 23rd Infantry Regiment that forces them into being replacements, while the bad weather that made the German assault successful ends, enabling Allied air power to harass the Germans. In their new unit, von Kroner meets Sgt. Ludwig and Cpl. Ennis, whom he knew in the prisoner camp; they say they were the only survivors of their escape, as the Germans knew about it and ambushed them.

Obtaining plans for an American counterattack against a strategic crossroad, von Kroner warns the Germans by radio of the American attack but is ordered to stay with the Americans to ensure that the attack fails. Von Kroner's team sabotage a jeep with a bomb, killing the company commander, and attempt to destroy the unit's other vehicle, a weapons carrier, arousing Ludwig's suspicion.

The company attacks a German position with Wilitz using the opportunity to shoot their lieutenant in the back, placing Ludwig in command. Several German prisoners are taken, and Richardson/Von Kroner volunteers to take them to Battalion headquarters. He returns to tell his comrades that the prisoners didn't want to escape; they wanted to surrender to the Americans with von Kroner taking them in. A furious Wilitz insists that von Kroner should have shot the lot of them.

With news of German infiltrators behind American lines spreading, Ludwig is further suspicious when Wilitz doesn't know what the American "hot foot" is.

== Cast ==
- Van Johnson as Lt. Hans von Kroner / Sgt. Leonard S. Richardson
- Kerwin Mathews as Wilitz / Cpl. Rhett Barton
- Dick York as Plt. Sgt. Otto Ludwig
- Larry Storch as Cpl. Virgil Ennis
- Lise Bourdin as Monique
- Han Bentz van den Berg as Major von Ruppel
- Leon Askin as Sgt. Steiner
- Robert Boon as Kirsch / PFC Lester B. Highland
- Ton Van Duinhoven as Hoffner / PFC Argojanion James
- Gijsbert Tersteeg as Colonel Eindorf
- Brett Halsey as Capt. Levin
- Charles Rosenblum as Schwarz

== Production ==
The film was shot in the Netherlands, in the Cinetone studios in Amsterdam and in the Veluwe forest at the Harskamp.
