= The Killer Likes Candy =

- Directed by: Maurice Cloche; Federico Chentrens
- Written by: Maurice Cloche; John Haggarty; Giovanni Simonelli
- Produced by: Richard Hellman
- Starring: Kerwin Mathews; Marilù Tolo
- Cinematography: Fausto Zuccoli
- Music by: Gianni Marchetti
- Release date: 1968
- Language: Italian

The Killer Likes Candy (Italian: Un killer per sua maestà, French: Le tueur aime les bonbons, German: Zucker für den Mörder) is a 1968 Italian-French-German Eurospy film directed by Maurice Cloche and Federico Chentrens and starring Kerwin Mathews. It is loosely based on the novel À cœur ouvert pour face d'ange by Adam Saint-Moore.

== Cast ==
- Kerwin Mathews as Mark
- Bruno Cremer as Oscar Snell
- Marilù Tolo as Sylva
- Venantino Venantini as Costa
- Ann Smyrner as Veronica
- Riccardo Garrone as Nicolo
- Werner Peters as Guardino
- Gordon Mitchell as Toni
- Lukas Ammann as Faoud
- Sieghardt Rupp as Ali
- Alain Saury as The General
- Elisa Cegani as Miss Boldani
- Fabienne Dali
- Umberto Raho
- Giuseppe Addobbati
