= Kerwin Mathews =

American actor (1926–2007)

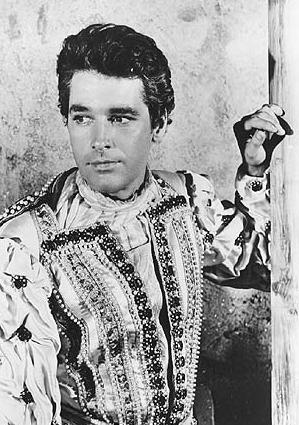
- Mathews as Jack the Giant Killer
- Born: January 8, 1926; Seattle, Washington, U.S.
- Died: July 5, 2007 (aged 81); San Francisco, California, U.S.
- Occupation: Actor
- Years active: 1954–1978
- Partner: Tom Nicoll (1961–2007; his death)

Kerwin Mathews (January 8, 1926 – July 5, 2007) was an American actor best known for playing the titular heroes in The 7th Voyage of Sinbad (1958), The Three Worlds of Gulliver (1960), and Jack the Giant Killer (1962).

== Early life ==
Verne Kerwin Mathews was born on January 8, 1926, in Seattle, Washington, and was two years old when he moved with his divorced mother to Janesville, Wisconsin, where he attended Janesville High School, graduating in 1943. Mathews said that "a kind high school teacher put me in a play, and that changed my life."

After serving in the United States Army Air Forces during World War II as a pilot and swimming instructor, he attended and performed at nearby Milton College for two years before transferring to Beloit College on drama and music scholarships. He remained at Beloit three years after graduation, teaching speech and dramatic arts, and appeared in regional theater. He also taught high school English in Lake Geneva, Wisconsin.

== Columbia Pictures ==
After moving to Los Angeles in 1954, Mathews acted at the Pasadena Playhouse, including a production of William Shakespeare's Comedy of Errors. While there he met the head of casting for Columbia Pictures, leading to a seven-year studio contract.

One of his first roles was in the episode "The Escape of Mr. Proteus" in Space Patrol. He had an uncredited bit in Cell 2455, Death Row (1955) for Columbia. His first credited film role was in 5 Against the House (1955), an early role for Kim Novak. His pay was $200 per week. Mathews then was cast in the title role of a treatment of Joseph and His Brothers with Rita Hayworth. However, the film was cancelled shortly before filming started.

Mathews appeared in several episodes of The Ford Television Theatre as well as episodes of Playhouse 90 and Matinee Theatre.

Mathews' first sizable role was as Lee J. Cobb's son in The Garment Jungle (1957). He was promoted to star for Tarawa Beachhead (1958), a war film produced by Charles Schneer. Schneer liked the actor's work and cast him in the role of Sinbad in The 7th Voyage of Sinbad (1958), directed by Nathan Juran with effects by Ray Harryhausen. The movie was a big success and remains Mathews' most famous film. Juran called Mathews "the epitome of professionalism." He was announced for Stop 424 to be shot in Australia by Columbia but the film was not made.

Mathews co-starred with Van Johnson in The Last Blitzkrieg (1959), a war film for Sam Katzman, and Man on a String (1960) with Ernest Borgnine (Mathews replaced Cliff Robertson for the latter). In The Last Blitzkrieg Mathews was cast against type as a fanatical Nazi. He did an episode of Goodyear Theatre and went to Italy to make The Warrior Empress (1960) with Tina Louise. He was on standby to replace Dirk Bogarde on Song Without End (1960) when Bogarde was clashing with the director.

Schneer cast Mathews in an unofficial follow-up to The 7th Voyage of Sinbad, The 3 Worlds of Gulliver (1960), playing the title role, with effects by Harryhausen. Columbia then put him in a prestigious film, The Devil at 4 O'Clock (1961), billed underneath Frank Sinatra and Spencer Tracy.

Mathews went to England to star in a swashbuckler film for Hammer Films released through Columbia, The Pirates of Blood River (1962). Edward Small cast him as Jack the Giant Killer (1962), directed by Juran, an attempt to repeat the success of Sinbad only without Harryhausen or Schneer.

Hammer called him back for Maniac (1963), a psycho thriller released by Columbia. He then left Columbia.

== Freelance actor ==
Mathews went to France to play Jean Bruce's OSS 117 in OSS 117 se déchaîne (1964). In Hollywood, he played Johann Strauss Jr. in the Disney two-part telefilm The Waltz King (1963), which was his favorite role.

He did another OSS 117 film, Panic in Bangkok (1964), then starred in The Viscount (1967), also from a novel by Bruce. In between, he starred in a pilot for Ghostbreakers, a TV show that did not go to series.

Mathews starred in some low-budget films, such as Battle Beneath the Earth (1968), filmed in England, and The Killer Likes Candy (1968). He had supporting parts in A Boy... a Girl (1969) directed by John Derek and Dead of Night: A Darkness at Blaisedon (1969), a pilot for a proposed series that was not picked up.

== Later career ==
Mathews had supporting roles in Barquero (1970), the TV movie Death Takes a Holiday (1971), and Octaman (1971). He guest-starred on General Hospital and Ironside. His last lead was The Boy Who Cried Werewolf (1973), directed by Juran.

== Retirement and death ==
Mathews retired from acting in 1978 and moved to San Francisco, where he ran a clothing and antiques shop. Mathews died in his sleep in San Francisco on July 5, 2007, at age 81.

He was survived by his partner of 46 years, Tom Nicoll (1929-2024), a British display manager at Harvey Nichols, the British luxury department store. Nicholl, under the pseudonym 'Scott of London', was also a physique photographer and body builder. The two met in 1961.

== Legacy ==
The city of Janesville renamed a one-block street adjacent to the former Janesville High School as Kerwin Mathews Court. The renovated building houses the Janesville Performing Arts Center.

== Filmography ==
=== Film ===
- Cell 2455 Death Row (1955) – Reporter (uncredited)
- 5 Against the House (1955) – Ronnie
- The Garment Jungle (1957) – Alan Mitchell
- Tarawa Beachhead (1958) – Sgt. Thomas A. 'Tom' Sloan
- The 7th Voyage of Sinbad (1958) – Sinbad
- The Last Blitzkrieg (1959) – Wilitz
- Man on a String (1960) – Bob Avery
- The Warrior Empress (1960) – Phaon
- The 3 Worlds of Gulliver (1960) – Dr. Lemuel Gulliver
- The Devil at 4 O'Clock (1961) – Father Joseph Perreau
- Pirates of Blood River (1962) – Jonathon Standing
- Jack the Giant Killer (1962) – Jack
- Maniac (1963) – Jeff Farrell
- OSS 117 Is Unleashed (1963, ‡) – Hubert Bonisseur de La Bath, alias OSS 117
- Shadow of Evil (1964, ‡) – Hubert Bonisseur de La Bath / OSS 117 / Tony Burt
- The Viscount (1967) – Clint de la Roche, le Vicomte
- Battle Beneath the Earth (1967) – Cmdr. Jonathan Shaw
- The Killer Likes Candy (1968) – Mark
- A Boy... a Girl (1969) – Mr. Christian
- Barquero (1970) – Marquette
- Octaman (1971) – Dr. Rick Torres
- The Boy Who Cried Werewolf (1973) – Robert Bridgestone
- Nightmare in Blood (1978) – Prince Zaroff (final film role)

‡ OSS 117 film

=== Television ===
- Space Patrol
  - The Escape of Mr Proteus (1954) – Major Caldwell
- Ford Theatre
  - Charlie C company (1954) – Lt. Norton
  - The Lady in the Wind (1955) – Ivor
  - Catch at Straws (1956) – Fred Karns
- Playhouse 90
  - The Country Husband (1956) – Clay Farrell
- Matinee Theatre
  - Show of Strength (1957)
  - The Suicide Club (1958)
- Goodyear Television Playhouse
  - The Obenauf Story (1959, †) – Lieutenant James Obenauf
- Walt Disney's Wonderful World of Color
  - The Waltz King (1963) (two parts) – Johann Strauss Jr.
- Ghostbreakers (1967, TV Movie, †) – Dr. Barnaby Cross
- Insight
  - "The Least of My Brothers" (1968) – American Priest
- Dead of Night: A Darkness at Blaisedon (1969, TV movie, †) – Jonathan Fletcher
- Death Takes a Holiday (1971, TV Movie) – Senator Earl Chapman, Jr.
- General Hospital
  - one episode (1972) – Dr. Duncan Stewart
- Ironside
  - "Hey, Buddy, Can You Spare a Life?" (1972) – Eric Oates
  - "Achilles' Heel" (1972) – Paul Arnstein

† Pilots for unsold series

== Notes ==
- Swires, Steve (June 1987). "Kerwin Mathews: The Perilous Voyages of Sinbad Part One". Starlog. No. 119. pp. 28–64.
- Swires, Steve (July 1987). "Kerwin Mathews: Confessions of a Giant Killer Part Two". Starlog. No. 120. pp. 67–70.
