= The River Girl =

1955 film

- Directed by: Mario Soldati
- Written by: Antonio Altoviti; Giorgio Bassani; Basilio Franchina; Pier Paolo Pasolini; Mario Soldati; Florestano Vancini; Ben Zavin
- Produced by: Carlo Ponti; Dino De Laurentiis; Basilio Franchina
- Starring: Sophia Loren
- Cinematography: Roberto Gerardi; Otello Martelli
- Edited by: Leo Catozzo
- Music by: Angelo Francesco Lavagnino; Armando Trovajoli
- Distributed by: Lux Film and Minerva Film (Italy); Columbia Pictures (United States)
- Release dates: 29 December 1955 (Italy); 18 December 1957 (United States)
- Running time: 105 minutes
- Countries: France; Italy
- Language: Italian

The River Girl (Italian: La donna del fiume) is a 1955 French-Italian melodrama film directed by Mario Soldati and starring Sophia Loren, Gérard Oury and Rik Battaglia.

== Plot ==
After discovering that she is pregnant, a peasant girl is deserted by her lover. In revenge she reports him to the police and customs officers for smuggling.

== Cast ==
- Sophia Loren as Nives Mangolini
- Rik Battaglia as Gino Lodi
- Gérard Oury as Enzo Cinti
- Lise Bourdin as Tosca
- Enrico Olivieri as Oscar
- Maria Conventi as Ivana
- Franco Polegatti as Chioggia
- Nino Marchetti as Carabinieri Marshal
- Mimmo Palmara
- Guido Celano

== Gallery ==
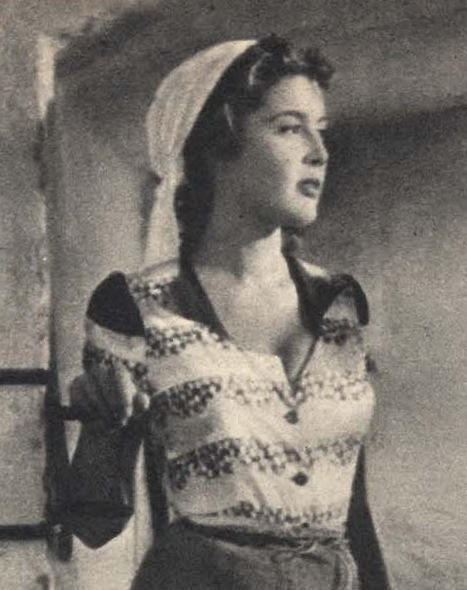

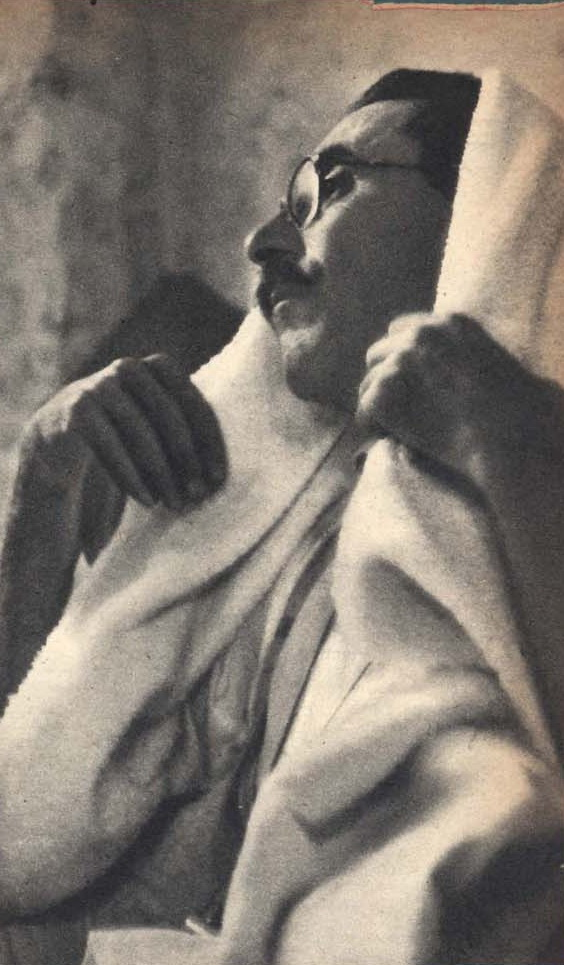

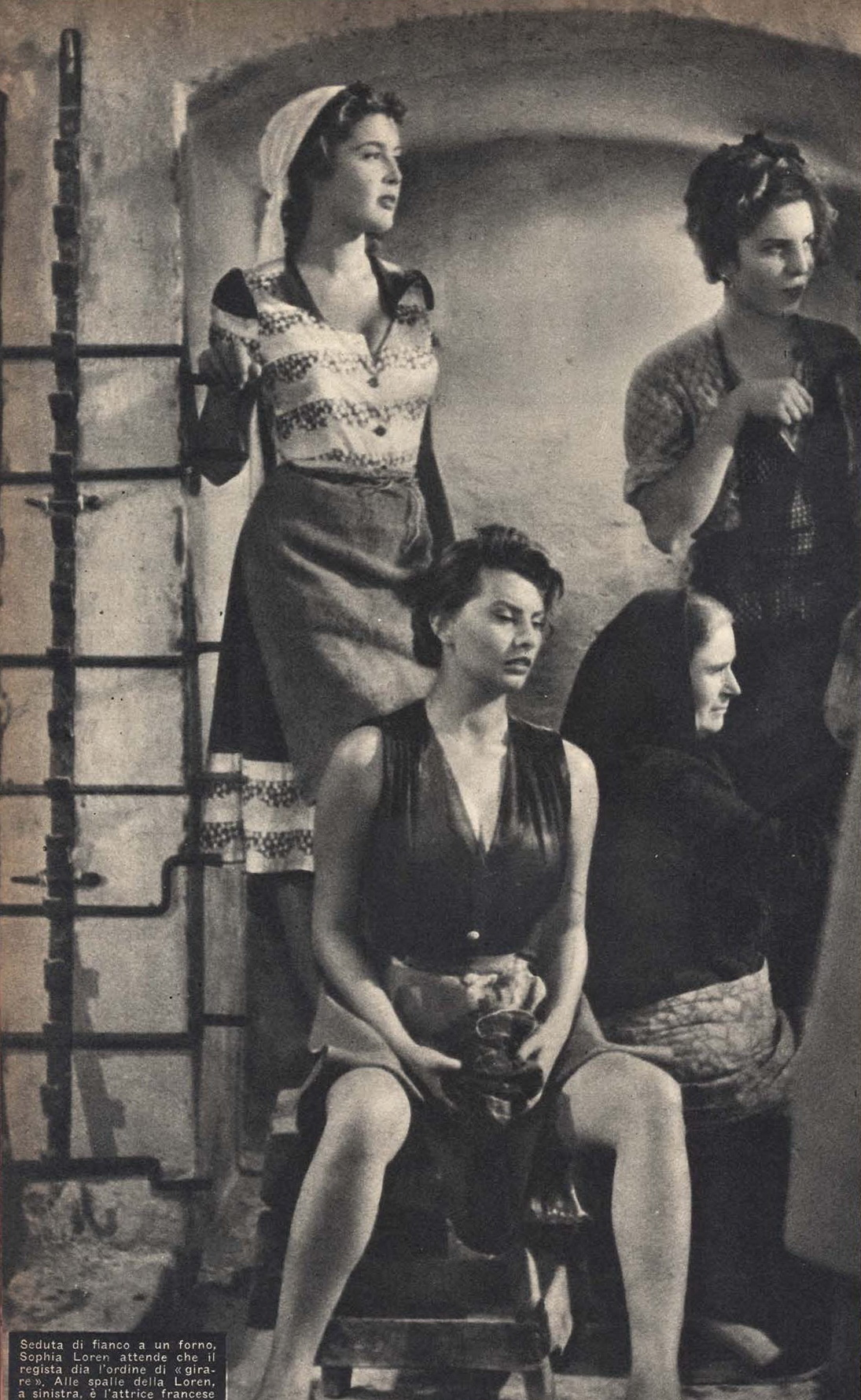

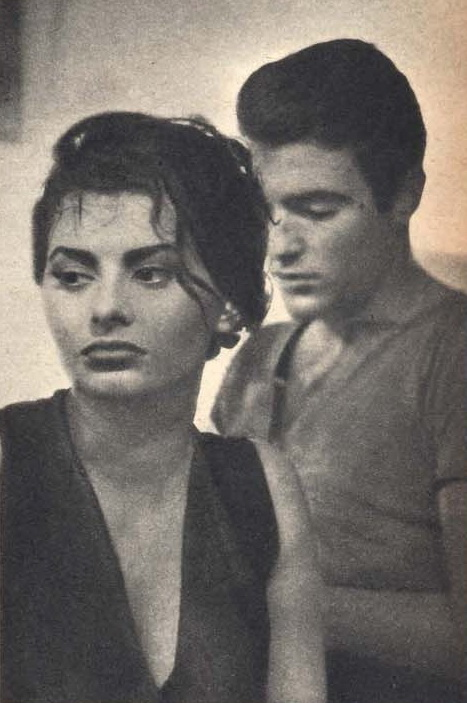

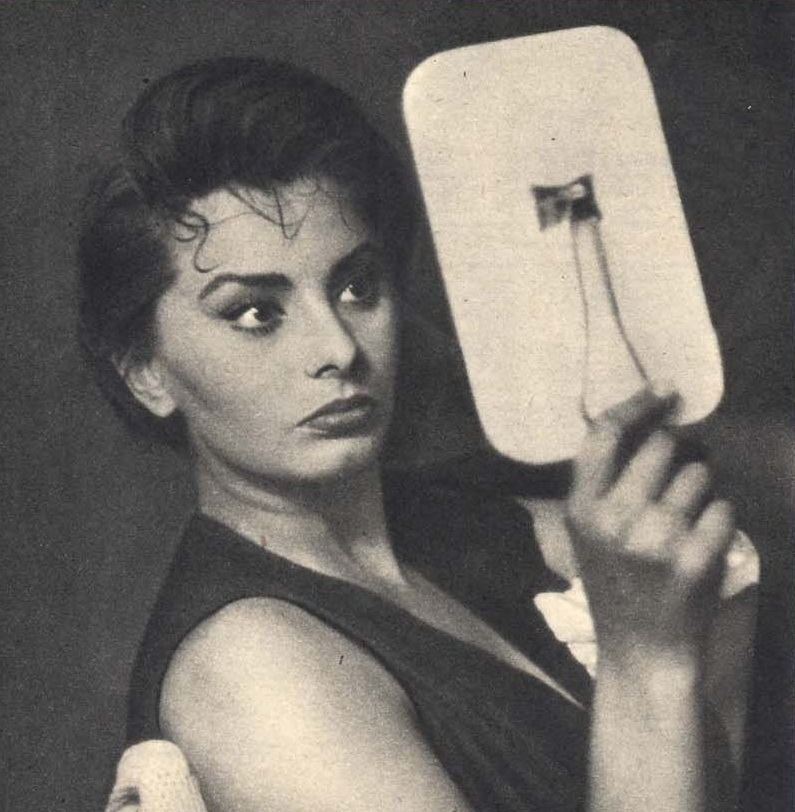

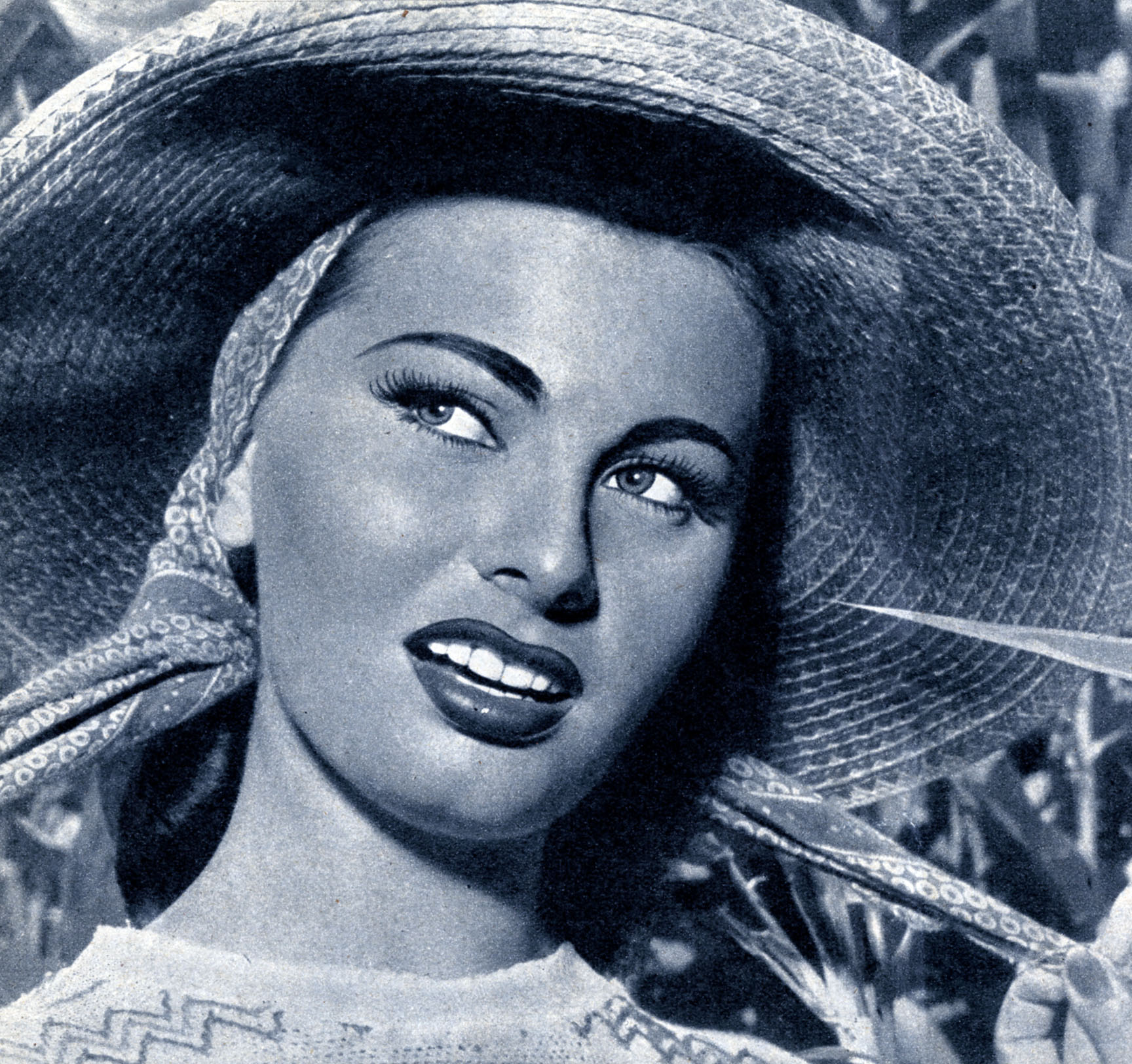
