= Tarawa Beachhead =

1958 film by Paul Wendkos

- Original film poster
- Directed by: Paul Wendkos
- Written by: Richard Alan Simmons
- Produced by: Charles H. Schneer
- Starring: Kerwin Mathews; Ray Danton; Julie Adams
- Cinematography: Henry Freulich
- Edited by: Jerome Thoms
- Production company: Columbia Pictures
- Distributed by: Columbia Pictures
- Release date: November 2, 1958
- Running time: 77 min.
- Country: United States
- Language: English

Tarawa Beachhead is a 1958 war film directed by Paul Wendkos. It stars Columbia Pictures contract star Kerwin Mathews in his first leading role and the husband and wife team of Ray Danton and Julie Adams. The working title of the film was Flag over Tarawa and was originally to have starred Ronald Reagan.

== Plot ==
Sgt. Tom Sloan sees his Lieutenant Joel Brady kill one of their own Marines, Johnny Campbell on Guadalcanal after Brady led a disastrous suicidal attack against Japanese entrenched in caves. As the only survivors of the debacle, Sloan does not turn Brady in as he assumes that no one will believe his word against an officer's. With Brady's recommendation, Sloan is later commissioned and assigned as an aide to a general (Onslow Stevens) back in the 2nd Marine Division headquarters in New Zealand.

Lt. Sloan meets Campbell's widow, Ruth (Julie Adams) to bring her letters written by Johnny. However he meets Brady who is keeping company with Ruth's sister (Karen Sharpe).

Sloan lands on Tarawa with Brady, now a captain; each hating each other more than the Japanese.

== Cast ==
- Kerwin Mathews as Sergeant (later Lieutenant) Thomas A. 'Tom' Sloan
- Julie Adams as Ruth Nelson Campbell
- Ray Danton as Lieutenant (later Captain) Joel Brady
- Karen Sharpe as Paula Nelson
- Onslow Stevens as General Nathan Keller

== Production ==
The film was said to contain extensive amounts of actual footage of the Battle of Tarawa. While some actual footage was used, most of the supposed actual footage were from the 1943 film Guadalcanal Diary and the 1949 film, Sands of Iwo Jima. Some footage was also used from the 1951 film Halls of Montezuma. The United States Marine Corps refused to cooperate with the producers, due to the theme of an officer out for glory killing his own men and a sergeant out for revenge.
