= The Boy Who Cried Werewolf (1973 film) =

1973 film by Nathan H. Juran

- Promotional poster for the film
- Directed by: Nathan H. Juran
- Written by: Bob Homel
- Produced by: Aaron Rosenberg
- Starring: Kerwin Mathews; Elaine Devry; Scott Sealey; Robert J. Wilke; Bob Homel
- Cinematography: Michael P. Joyce
- Edited by: Barton Hayes
- Music by: Ted Stovall
- Production companies: Pacific Bay Entertainment (uncredited, was to be credited in the 1986 reissue); RKF
- Distributed by: Universal Pictures
- Release dates: August 1, 1973 (New York City, New York); November 21, 1973 (Bismarck, North Dakota)
- Running time: 93 minutes
- Country: United States
- Language: English

The Boy Who Cried Werewolf is a 1973 Technicolor horror film directed by Nathan H. Juran. The film stars Kerwin Mathews in the final film he and Juran made after their earlier work, which included The 7th Voyage of Sinbad. In this thriller, a boy visits his father in a secluded cabin; the father is attacked by a werewolf and then becomes one himself. The boy constantly tries to tell others, but no one will believe him.

Juran came out of retirement to make the film as a favour to producer Aaron Rosenberg.

== Plot ==
Robert Bridgestone, a divorced father, takes his young son Richie to the family's remote mountain cabin for a weekend visit. During a nighttime hike under a full moon, they are suddenly attacked by a large, ferocious creature. In the ensuing struggle, the beast falls into a ravine and is fatally impaled on a wooden fence, but not before biting Robert on the arm. When the body is recovered, it proves to be that of a human man. The local sheriff, unable to identify the deceased, attributes the incident to a deranged vagrant. Richie, however, insists the attacker was a werewolf. His father and the sheriff dismiss the claim as a child's overactive imagination. Worried by Richie's persistent belief, his mother Sandy urges Robert to consult the boy's psychiatrist. The doctor attributes Richie's fixation to trauma: unable to accept that his father killed a man in self-defense, the child has constructed a fantasy in which Robert heroically fought a monster. The psychiatrist recommends that Robert return with Richie to the cabin, reasoning that revisiting the site and finding it ordinary will dispel the delusion.

On their next trip to the cabin, another full moon rises. Robert feels intense pain, sends Richie to the nearby stream, and watches in a mirror as his body transforms into a werewolf identical to the creature he had slain. Richie glimpses the beast, believes it is the same monster returned to life, and flees in terror across a mountain road. The werewolf pursues, causing a vehicle crash in which one driver is brutally killed. Richie encounters a camping newlywed couple who, though skeptical of his story, take pity on the frightened boy and offer to drive him to safety. They arrive at the cabin to find Robert absent. Richie pleads to spend the night with the couple in their camper. The following morning, a disoriented Robert appears, claiming he searched all night for his son. When Richie mentions the werewolf again, Robert grows impatient.

The next full moon brings another transformation. Robert, now the werewolf, searches the cabin for Richie, who has hidden himself in anticipation. The creature then attacks the newlyweds' camper, pushing it down a slope and mutilating the occupants, one of whose severed heads it carries away. Before dawn, it buries the head in the cabin shed. Richie, alerted by the sounds, witnesses the werewolf revert to human form as his father. Shortly afterward, the sheriff arrives to discuss the recent killings, suspecting a link to the earlier incident. On the drive home, Richie confronts Robert about the events, but his father, troubled by his memory lapses, brushes the questions aside. Upon reaching Sandy's house, Richie flees the car, telling his mother he fears being alone with his father because he is a monster.

Sandy discusses Richie's terror with Robert and agrees to another psychiatric consultation. The doctor explains that the boy sincerely believes Robert is a werewolf, a powerful fantasy in children, and notes that, in folklore, werewolf victims experience amnesia and progressive hand deformity. As the session continues under a rising full moon, Robert transforms and kills the psychiatrist. Unaware of the murder reported in the morning newspaper, Sandy, Richie, and Robert depart for another family weekend at the cabin. En route, they stop at a hippie commune where the group is performing a ritual circle to repel evil spirits. Sandy joins in amusement, but Robert is mysteriously barred from crossing the circle's boundary, as though blocked by an invisible force. Disturbed, Sandy pulls him away, and they continue to the cabin.

That evening, Sandy confides in Robert that she misses him and suggests reconciliation. As the full moon rises, Robert silently withdraws. In the shed, he finds Richie unearthing the buried head. In the early stages of transformation, Robert urges Richie to lock him inside the shed for safety. Richie complies, but Sandy, hearing the commotion, scolds her son and attempts to open the door. A clawed hand bursts through, forcing Richie and Sandy to flee to their car as the fully transformed werewolf emerges. The creature attacks the hippie commune. At sunrise, it collapses and reverts to human form before the stunned onlookers, who pray over the body. Robert regains consciousness and escapes into the woods.

Sandy and Richie alert the sheriff. Returning to the cabin, they find no trace of the creature, though deputies are posted as guards. Robert, hiding nearby, notices his index finger has become deformed. That night, the werewolf enters the cabin through a window and confronts the sleeping Sandy. Her screams bring the deputies, who fire at the fleeing beast. Richie pleads for them not to harm his father, but the others remain unconvinced of the supernatural truth. As the sheriff organizes a search party the following evening, Richie slips away to find his father. Under the rising moon, he locates the transformed Robert, who seizes him and flees with the mob in pursuit. Cornered, the werewolf bites Richie's arm before gunfire distracts it. Though bullets cannot kill the creature, it stumbles in panic and impales itself on a broken wooden stake from the commune's ritual cross, piercing its heart. As Richie and Sandy watch in horror, the werewolf reverts to Robert's human form and dies. Sandy examines the bite on her son's arm, her expression turning to dread as she realizes the curse may now pass to Richie.

== Cast ==
- Kerwin Mathews as Robert Bridgestone
- Elaine Devry as Sandy Bridgestone
- Scott Sealey as Richie Bridgestone
- Robert J. Wilke as the Sheriff
- Susan Foster as Jenny
- Jack Lucas as Harry
- Bob Homel as Brother Christopher
- George Gaynes as Dr. Marderosian
- Loretta Temple as Monica
- David S. Cass Sr. as Deputy Dave Cass
- Harold Goodwin as Mr. Duncan
- Tim Haldeman as First Guard
- John Logan as Second Guard
- Eric Gordon as Hippy "Jesus Freak"
- Paul Baxley as First Werewolf

== Critical reception ==
The New York Times wrote, "Skip The Boy Who Cried Werewolf, the standard, slapdash half of a new horror double bill that includes something called Sssssss (as in snake). There is some amusing business in Werewolf toward the end, as the thrashing werewolf (Kerwin Mathews) tangles with a bunch of Jesus Freaks. Bob Homel, who plays the leader, also wrote the picture."
