= The Warrior Empress =

- Directed by: Pietro Francisci
- Written by: Ennio De Concini; Pietro Francisci; Luciano Martino; Paddy Manning O'Brine
- Produced by: Marcello D'Amico; Gianni Hecht Lucari
- Starring: Kerwin Mathews; Tina Louise; Riccardo Garrone
- Cinematography: Carlo Carlini; Giulio Bongini
- Edited by: Nino Baragli
- Music by: Angelo Francesco Lavagnino
- Production companies: Documento Film; Orsay Films
- Distributed by: Columbia Pictures
- Release date: 24 August 1960
- Running time: 87 minutes
- Countries: France; Italy
- Language: Italian

The Warrior Empress (Italian: Saffo – Venere di Lesbo) is a 1960 Italian-French peplum film directed by Pietro Francisci and starring Kerwin Mathews, Tina Louise and Riccardo Garrone.

== Cast ==
- Kerwin Mathews as Phaon
- Tina Louise as Sappho
- Riccardo Garrone as Hyperbius
- Susy Andersen as Actis
- Alberto Farnese as Laricus
- Enrico Maria Salerno as Melanchrus
- Antonio Battistella as Paione
- Strelsa Brown as Priestess of Aphrodite
- Annie Gorassini as Dyla
- Aldo Fiorelli as Scarface
- Elda Tattoli as Sappho's Nurse
- Isa Crescenzi as Peasant Woman
- Lilly Mantovani as Cleide
- Marisa Quattrini as Temple's Guardian
- Elena Zareschi as Sibilla
- Jacques Castelot
- Solveyg D'Assunta as Elena
- Mirella Di Centa as Mina
- Elena Fontana
- Erica Jorger
- Litz Kibiska
- Erina Locatelli
- Elena May
- Audrey McDonald
- Olga Sievers
- Elke Sommer
- Omero Capanna as Soldier

== Bibliography ==
- Gary Allen Smith. Epic Films: Casts, Credits and Commentary on More Than 350 Historical Spectacle Movies. McFarland, 2004.
