= The River of Three Junks =

- Directed by: André Pergament
- Written by: Georges Godefroy (novel); Solange Térac
- Starring: Dominique Wilms; Lise Bourdin; Jean Gaven
- Cinematography: Jean Bourgoin; Michel Rocca
- Edited by: Claude Gros
- Music by: Daniel White
- Production company: Jeannic Films
- Release date: 25 January 1957
- Running time: 96 minutes
- Country: France
- Language: French

The River of Three Junks (French: La rivière des trois jonques) is a 1957 French thriller film directed by André Pergament and starring Dominique Wilms, Lise Bourdin and Jean Gaven. Based on the 1952 novel Les Gentlemen de Hong Kong by Georges Godefroy, the novel was reissued in 1956 as La Rivière des trois jonques. The film is set in Saigon. It was remade in 1965 under the title Red Dragon returning to Hong Kong.

The film's sets were designed by the art director Daniel Guéret.

== Cast ==
- Dominique Wilms as Monique
- Lise Bourdin as Princess Tchéliabruskoi
- Jean Gaven as Capitaine Brichet
- Howard Vernon as Igor Kourguine
- Alain Bouvette as Kerganec
- Robert Dalban as Capitaine Campion / Secret Service chief
- Paul Bisciglia as Le chauffeur de taxi / Driver

== Bibliography ==
- Goble, Alan. The Complete Index to Literary Sources in Film. Walter de Gruyter, 1999.
