= Chela Matthison =

Canadian-British actress (born 1942)

- Born: 31 July 1942 (age 84); Vancouver, British Columbia, Canada
- Occupation: Actress
- Years active: 1962–1978

Chela Matthison (born 31 July 1942) is a Canadian-British actress.

== Life and career ==
Matthison, the daughter of a family of British origins, born in Vancouver, Canada and raised there and in New Westminster. After the Lester Pearson high school, Matthison went on to study professional theatre and graduated in the first class from the National Theatre School of Canada in 1963. Matthison's early television role was in a 1962 episode of Shoestring Theatre, and parts in Quest and The Serial soon followed. She also appeared in the documentary short The Overfamiliar Subordinate in 1965.

She moved to London, England in search of more working opportunities. There she was cast in a small uncredited role as the space station receptionist in Stanley Kubrick's film 2001: A Space Odyssey. In 1967, Matthison moved to California and married Robert Cannon, who was a fighter pilot in the US Navy. The couple subsequently moved to British Columbia, Canada. Matthison appeared in the TV movie Who'll Save Our Children? (1978) and did television commercials in Canada, before going on to work for years in the real estate business.

Matthison's aunt was an Anglo-American stage actress Edith Wynne Matthison, who also appeared in two silent films.

== Filmography ==
=== Film ===
| Year | Title | Role | Notes |
|---|---|---|---|
| 1965 | The Overfamiliar Subordinate | | (Short documentary) |
| 1967 | Battle Beneath the Earth | Nurse | |
| 1968 | 2001: A Space Odyssey | Receptionist | uncredited |

=== Television ===
| Year | Title | Role | Notes |
|---|---|---|---|
| 1962 | Shoestring Theatre | | Episode: "Variations on an Old Theme" |
| 1962 | Quest | Woman | Episode: "Jealousy" |
| 1964 | The Serial | Julie | "More Joy in Heaven" |
| 1965 | Masters in Our Own House | Monique | TV film |
| 1966 | Theatre 625 | Louella | Episode: "Girl of My Dreams" |
| 1966 | Thirty-Minute Theatre | Suzy | Episode: "The Towers of Manhattan" |
| 1978 | Who'll Save Our Children? | | TV film |

== Stage ==
| Year | Title | Role | Notes |
|---|---|---|---|
| 1963 | Timon of Athens | Dancer | Festival Theatre, Stratford, Ontario |
