= Conspiracy of the Borgias =

1959 film

- Directed by: Antonio Racioppi
- Written by: Giorgio Costantini; Fernando Morandi; Vittorio Nino Novarese; Antonio Racioppi
- Produced by: Dino Sant'Ambrogio
- Starring: Frank Latimore; Constance Smith; Gisèle Gallois
- Cinematography: Aldo Greci
- Edited by: Dolores Tamburini
- Music by: Tarcisio Fusco; Guido Robuschi; Gian Stellari
- Production company: Diamante
- Release date: 23 January 1959
- Running time: 93 minutes
- Country: Italy
- Language: Italian

Conspiracy of the Borgias (Italian: La congiura dei Borgia) is a 1959 Italian historical drama film directed by Antonio Racioppi and starring Frank Latimore, Constance Smith and Gisèle Gallois.

== Cast ==
- Frank Latimore as Guido di Belmonte
- Constance Smith as Lucrezia Borgia
- Gisèle Gallois as Simonetta di Rovena
- Alberto Farnese as Enzo de Rovena
- José Jaspe as Falconetto
- Valeria Fabrizi
- Flora Carosello
- Tommaso Gizzi
- Gino Buzzanca
- Andrea Fantasia
- Gildo Bocci
- Nino Musco
- Nino Marchesini
- Carla Strober
- Giorgio Costantini

== Bibliography ==
- James Robert Parish & Kingsley Canham. Film directors guide--Western Europe. Scarecrow Press, 1976.
