= Lise Bourdin =

French actress (1925–2025)

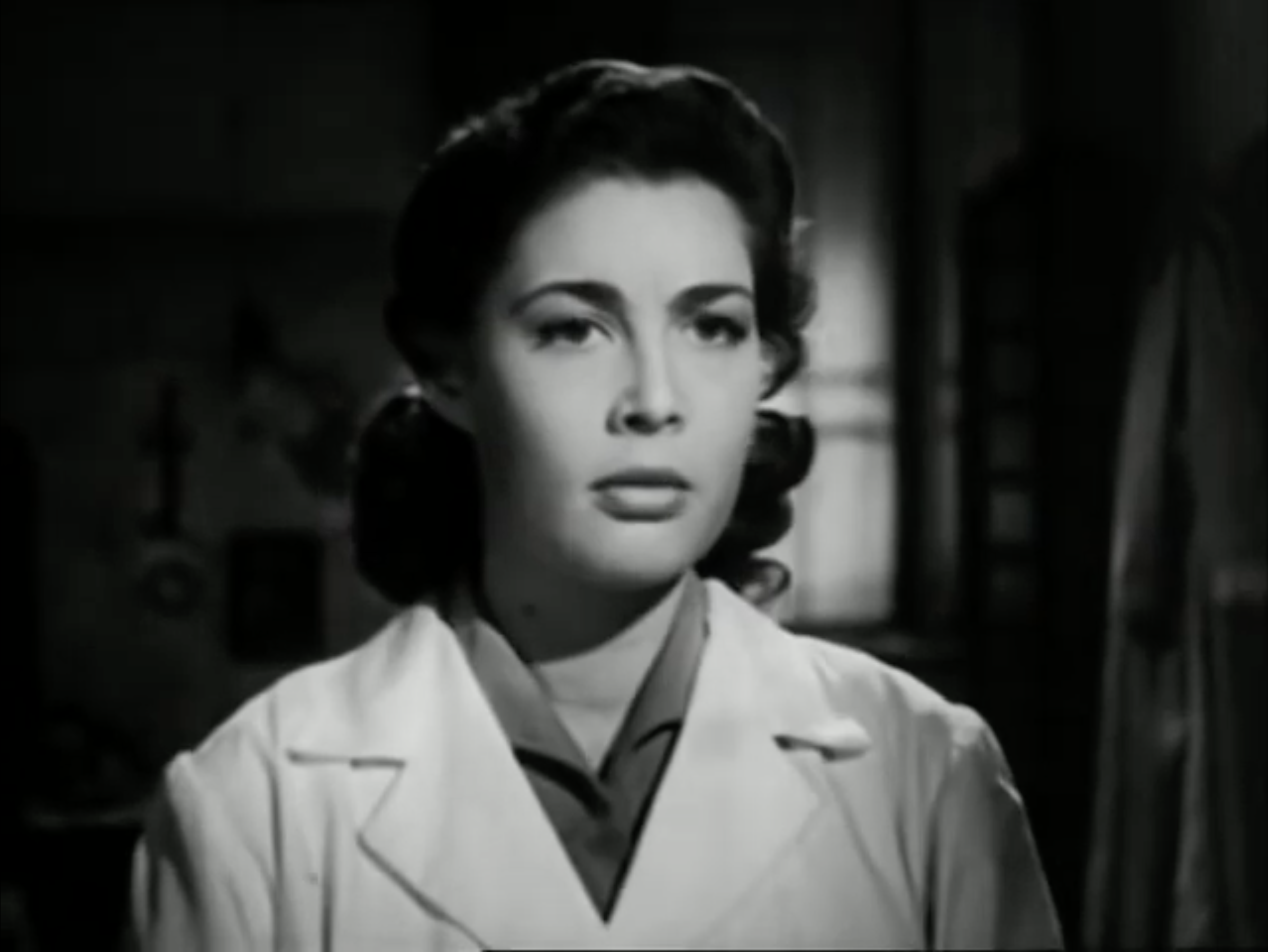
- Bourdin in 1955
- Born: 30 November 1925; Néris-les-Bains, Allier, France
- Died: 28 November 2025 (aged 99); Labastide-d'Armagnac, Landes, France
- Occupation: Actress
- Years active: 1949–1959 (film)
- Spouse: Roberto Seabra (1963–1965) (divorced)
- Partner: Raymond Marcellin (1974–2004; his death)

Lise Bourdin (30 November 1925 – 28 November 2025) was a French actress and model who appeared during the Golden Age of French classic cinema. She was a leading figure in post-war French cinema and fashion known for her role as one of the many girlfriends of Gary Cooper's character in the 1957 Billy Wilder romantic comedy, Love in the Afternoon.

Bourdin died at her home in Labastide-d’Armagnac, France, on 28 November 2025, aged 99.

== Selected filmography ==
- Children of Love (1953)
- The River Girl (1954)
- The Last Five Minutes (1955)
- Desperate Farewell (1955)
- La ladra (1955)
- Love in the Afternoon (1957)
- The River of Three Junks (1957)
- Dishonorable Discharge (1957)
- The Last Blitzkrieg (1959)
- Quay of Illusions (1959)

== Bibliography ==
- Goble, Alan. The Complete Index to Literary Sources in Film. Walter de Gruyter, 1999.
