= Dominique Wilms =

Belgian actress (1930–2025)

- Born: Claudine Maria Celina Wilmes; 8 June 1930; Montignies-sur-Sambre, Belgium
- Died: 17 September 2025 (aged 95); Paris, France
- Occupation: Actress
- Years active: 1953–1972
- Spouse: Jean Gaven

Dominique Wilms (8 June 1930 – 17 September 2025) was a Belgian actress known for her appearance in French classic films of 1950s.

== Life and career ==
Married to actor Jean Gaven, she was widowed by him in 2014.

Wilms died on 17 September 2025, at the age of 95.

== Selected filmography ==
- Poison Ivy (1953)
- Dames Don't Care (1954)
- The Babes Make the Law (1955)
- The River of Three Junks (1957)
- Bombs on Monte Carlo (1960)
- Caesar the Conqueror (1962)
- Panic in Bangkok (1964)
- Four Queens for an Ace (1966)
- The Trap Snaps Shut at Midnight (1966)
