= Vittorio Nino Novarese =

Italian costume designer, writer and art director

- Born: 15 May 1907; Rome, Kingdom of Italy
- Died: 17 October 1983 (aged 76); Los Angeles, California, U.S.
- Occupations: Costume designer; writer; art director
- Years active: 1937–1981
- Children: Letícia Román

Vittorio Nino Novarese (15 May 1907 – 17 October 1983) was an Italian costume designer, writer and art director. His accolades include two Academy Awards, in addition to nominations for a BAFTA Award and two Emmy Awards.

Born in Rome, Novarese began his career in Italian cinema in the late 1930s, working in several roles, including both as costume designer and screenwriter. He emigrated to the U.S. in 1949 and found great success in Hollywood. He has been nominated five times for the Academy Award for Best Costume Design, winning twice for Cleopatra (1963) and Cromwell (1970). Novarese died in Los Angeles on 17 October 1983, at the age of 76. He was the father of actress Letícia Román.

== Selected filmography ==
=== Film ===
List of Vittorio Nino Novarese film credits
Year	Title	Director	Credited as		Notes
Year	Title	Director	Costume Designer	Writer	Notes
1934	1860	Alessandro Blasetti	Yes	No	
1938	The Last Enemy	Umberto Barbaro	Yes	No	Also set decorator
1938	Ettore Fieramosca	Alessandro Blasetti	Yes	Yes	Co-written with Augusto Mazzetti, Cesare Ludovici and Alessandro Blasetti; Co-designed with Marina Arcangeli; Novarese designed men's costumes, whereas Arcangeli designed gowns
1939	No Man's Land	Mario Baffico	Yes	No	
1939	Hurricane in the Tropics	Pier Luigi Faraldo; Gino Talamo	Yes	No	
1940	Love Trap	Raffaello Matarazzo	Yes	No	Also set decorator
1941	Marco Visconti	Mario Bonnard	Yes	Yes	Co-written with Cesare Ludovici and Oreste Gasperini; Also art director
1941	The King's Jester	Mario Bonnard	Yes	No	Also art director
1942	Before the Postman	Mario Bonnard	No	No	Art director
1942	Rossini	Mario Bonnard	Yes	Yes	Co-written with Parsifal Bassi, Luigi Bonelli, Mario Bonnard, Luciano Doria, Gherardo Gherardi, Vittorio Gui, Alberto Luchini and Edoardo Nulli
1943	Two Hearts Among the Beasts	Giorgio Simonelli	Yes	No	
1945	No Turning Back	Alessandro Blasetti	No	Yes	Co-written with Alba De Cespedes and Alessandro Blasetti
1945	Two Anonymous Letters	Mario Camerini	No	Yes	Co-written with Ivo Perilli Mario Camerini, Carlo Musso and Turi Vasile
1945	His Young Wife	Mario Soldati	Yes	No	
1947	Bullet for Stefano	Duilio Coletti	Yes	No	
1948	Prelude to Madness	Gianni Franciolini	No	Yes	Co-written with Gianni Franciolini, Gianna Manzini, Ivo Perilli, Antonio Pietrangeli and Guido Piovene
1948	Les Misérables	Riccardo Freda	No	Yes	Co-written with Riccardo Freda, Mario Monicelli and Stefano Vanzina
1948	The Mysterious Rider	Riccardo Freda	Yes	No	Also art director
1948	The Man with the Grey Glove	Camillo Mastrocinque	No	Yes	Co-written with Camillo Mastrocinque and Fulvio Palmieri
1948	Pagliacci	Mario Costa	Yes	No	
1949	Hand of Death	Carlo Campogalliani	No	Yes	Co-written with Carlo Campogalliani and Paola Ojetti
1949	Black Magic	Gregory Ratoff	Yes	No	Co-designed with Georges Annenkov
1949	Prince of Foxes	Henry King	Yes	No	
1950	My Beautiful Daughter	Duilio Coletti	No	Yes	Co-written with Fulvio Palmieri
1950	Hawk of the Nile	Giacomo Gentilomo	Yes	Yes	
1950	Shadow of the Eagle	Sidney Salkow	Yes	No	
1950	Women and Brigands	Mario Soldati	Yes	Yes	Co-written with Pierre Lestringuez, Nicola Manzari and Mario Soldati
1950	The Thief of Venice	John Brahm	Yes	No	
1951	The Rival of the Empress	Jacopo Comin; Sidney Salkow	Yes	No	
1951	The Count of Saint Elmo	Guido Brignone	Yes	Yes	Co-written with Guido Brignone and Aldo De Benedetti
1951	Messalina	Carmine Gallone	Yes	Yes	Co-written with Carmine Gallone, Albert Valentin, Pierre Laroche and Cesare Ludovici; Also art director
1951	Lorenzaccio	Raffaello Pacini	No	Yes	Co-written with Raffaello Pacini and Giampiero Pucci
1952	The Wonderful Adventures of Guerrin Meschino	Pietro Francisci	Yes	No	
1952	The Adventures of Mandrin	Mario Soldati	Yes	Yes	Co-written with Giorgio Bassani, Augusto Frassinetti and Mario Soldati
1952	The Dream of Zorro	Mario Soldati	Yes	No	
1952	The Queen of Sheba	Pietro Francisci	Yes	Yes	Co-written with Raul De Sarro, Pietro Francisci and Giorgio Graziosi
1952	Il romanzo della mia vita	Lionello De Felice	No	Yes	Co-written with Lionello De Felice
1952	La colpa di una madre	Carlo Duse	No	Yes	Co-written with Carlo Duse
1952	Nessuno ha tradito	Roberto Bianchi Montero	No	Yes	Co-written with Carlo De Sanctis and Fulvio Palmieri
1953	Too Young for Love	Lionello De Felice	No	Yes	Co-written with Franco Brusati and Lionello De Felice
1953	The Pagans	Ferruccio Cerio	Yes	No	
1953	Frine, Courtesan of Orient	Mario Bonnard	Yes	No	
1953	The Story of William Tell	Jack Cardiff	Yes	No	Unfinished film
1954	Maddalena	Augusto Genina	Yes	No	
1954	Crossed Swords	Milton Krims	Yes	No	
1954	Concert of Intrigue	Mario Bonnard	No	Yes	Co-written with Mario Bonnard; Also uncredited costume designer
1954	Mata Hari's Daughter	Carmine Gallone	No	Yes	Co-written with Renzo Merusi, Piccini Vitali, Jean Aurel and André Tabet
1954	Orient Express	Carlo Ludovico Bragaglia	No	Yes	Co-written with Jacques Companeez, Vitaliano Brancati, Aldo De Benedetti and Agenore Incrocci
1954	House of Ricordi	Carmine Gallone	No	Yes	Co-written with Leonardo Benvenuti, Luigi Filippo D'Amico, Furio Scarpelli, Agenore Incrocci and Carmine Gallone
1954	Loves of Three Queens	Marc Allégret; Edgar G. Ulmer	Yes	No	
1955	Desperate Farewell	Lionello De Felice	No	Yes	Co-written with Lionello De Felice, Sergio De Pascale and Ernesto Guida
1955	Beautiful but Dangerous	Robert Z. Leonard	Yes	No	Co-designed with Veniero Colasanti
1955	La ladra	Mario Bonnard	No	Yes	Co-written with Mario Bonnard
1956	Symphony of Love	Glauco Pellegrini	Yes	No	
1958	Captain Falcon	Carlo Campogalliani	No	Yes	Co-written with Carlo Campogalliani, Isabella Conino, Gino Mangini and Emimmo Salvi
1959	Herod the Great	Victor Tourjansky	Yes	No	
1959	Conspiracy of the Borgias	Antonio Racioppi	No	Yes	Co-written with Giorgio Costantini, Fernando Morandi and Antonio Racioppi
1959	Knight Without a Country	Giacomo Gentilomo	No	Story	
1959	Head of a Tyrant	Fernando Cerchio	Yes	No	
1959	Sheba and the Gladiator	Guido Brignone	Yes	No	
1960	The Savage Innocents	Nicholas Ray	No	No	Uncredited costume designer
1960	The Story of Ruth	Henry Koster	Yes	No	
1961	Francis of Assisi	Michael Curtiz	Yes	No	
1963	Cleopatra	Joseph L. Mankiewicz	Yes	No	Co-designed with Renié; Novarese designed men's costumes, whereas Renié designed women's costumes
1965	The Greatest Story Ever Told	George Stevens	Yes	No	Co-designed with Marjorie Best
1965	The Agony and the Ecstasy	Carol Reed	Yes	No	
1965	The War Lord	Franklin J. Schaffner	Yes	No	
1967	The King's Pirate	Don Weis	Yes	No	
1970	Cromwell	Ken Hughes	Yes	No	
1971	Zachariah	George Englund	Yes	No	
1974	The Terminal Man	Mike Hodges	Yes	No	Co-designed with Donald Brooks
1978	Angela	Boris Sagal	Yes	No	Co-designed with François Barbeau

=== Television ===
List of Vittorio Nino Novarese television credits
Year	Title	Contribution		Notes
Year	Title	Costume Designer	Art Director	Notes
1976	Sandokan	Yes	Yes	6 episodes Co-designed costumes with Fabrizio Caracciolo
1981	Masada	Yes	No	4 episodes
1981	The Archer: Fugitive from the Empire	Yes	No	Television film
1981	Peter and Paul	Yes	No	2 episodes

== Awards and nominations ==
Award	Year (Note: Indicates the year of ceremony. Each year is linked to the article about the awards held that year, wherever possible.)	Category	Work	Result	Ref.
Academy Awards	1950	Best Costume Design – Black and White	Prince of Foxes	Nominated	
Academy Awards	1964	Best Costume Design – Color	Cleopatra	Won	
Academy Awards	1966	Best Costume Design – Color	The Agony and the Ecstasy	Nominated	
Academy Awards	1966	Best Costume Design – Color	The Greatest Story Ever Told	Nominated	
Academy Awards	1971	Best Costume Design	Cromwell	Won	
British Academy Film Awards	1971	Best Costume Design	Cromwell	Nominated	
Primetime Emmy Awards	1981	Outstanding Costume Design for a Series	Masada (Episode: "Part IV")	Nominated	
Primetime Emmy Awards	1981	Outstanding Costume Design for a Special	Peter and Paul	Nominated	
