= La ladra =

1955 film directed by Mario Bonnard

- Directed by: Mario Bonnard
- Written by: Vittorio Nino Novarese; Mario Bonnard
- Starring: Lise Bourdin; Fausto Tozzi
- Cinematography: Tino Santoni
- Edited by: Antonietta Zita
- Music by: Luigi Malatesta
- Release date: 15 December 1955
- Language: Italian

La ladra (French: Les anges aux mains noires) is a 1955 Italian-French crime-melodrama film co-written and directed by Mario Bonnard and starring Lise Bourdin and Fausto Tozzi.

== Plot ==
Whistle is an orphaned boy, raised in an environment unsuitable for a budding child and thief. A shady lawyer, an accomplice of thieves and fences, entrusts him to Nino, the leader of a gang that is preparing a particularly valuable coup. On the appointed day, Whistle and Bebè, accompanied by Nino who passes himself off as an employer, must present themselves at Countess Barenghi's house as chimney sweeps, but Whistle seriously injures himself falling from the chimney and sends the blow upstream. Anna, who has lost a small son and has begun to become attached to the child, pretends to be his mother to take him away but the doctor, called by the countess, forbids him to move. The two thus live a few days in that strange house, during which they become attached to each other. In the meantime, Nino, feeling abandoned, has found a new lover in Mary, a no good one who follows him in the planned coup but who, in an attempt to take possession of the stolen goods, reports him to the police. Nino manages to go untraceable after hiding the loot in Anna's house who, unaware of everything, returns a few days later with Whistle and where the police end up finding it. Anna is obviously arrested while Whistle (who in the meantime had him baptized giving him the name Paolo, that of her missing son), ends up in a boarding school at the expense of the countess, who believes in the innocence of the woman and also pays the expenses of a lawyer. With the support of Don Pietro and the same lawyer, Anna reacts firmly to prove her innocence, which will only happen with Nino's arrest.

== Cast ==
- Lise Bourdin as Anna
- Fausto Tozzi as Nino
- Carlo D'Angelo as Don Pietro
- Henry Vilbert as Lawyer
- Lyla Rocco as Mary
- Piero Giagnoni as Fischio
- Memmo Carotenuto as Ciuffo
- Carlo Delle Piane as Bebè
- Lauro Gazzolo as Butler
- Carla Calò as Gemma
- Vera Carmi as Countess Barenghi
- Cristina Pall as Housekeeper
- Franco Jamonte as Milo
- Gildo Bocci as Professor
- Renato Navarrini as Doctor
- Enrico Glori as Brigadier
- Saro Urzì as Caporale
- Mino Doro as Arrighi
