= Tarcisio Fusco =

Italian composer

- Born: 27 May 1904; Sant'Agata de' Goti, Campania, Italy
- Died: 1 January 1962 (aged 57); Rome, Lazio, Italy
- Occupation: Film score composer
- Years active: 1940-1961

Tarcisio Fusco was an Italian composer of film scores. He was the brother of the composer Giovanni Fusco and the uncle of operatic soprano Cecilia Fusco.

== Selected filmography ==
- Boccaccio (1940)
- Free Escape (1951)
- Abracadabra (1952)
- The Eternal Chain (1952)
- Beauties in Capri (1952)
- Milanese in Naples (1954)
- Conspiracy of the Borgias (1959)

== Bibliography ==
- John Stewart. Italian film: a who's who. McFarland, 1994.
