= Knight Without a Country =

1959 Italian adventure film

- Directed by: Giacomo Gentilomo
- Written by: Antonio Racioppi; Remo Chiti; Giorgio Costantini; Paolo Lombardo; Fernando Morandi
- Story by: Vittorio Nino Novarese
- Starring: Gérard Landry; Constance Smith
- Cinematography: Anchise Brizzi
- Music by: Ezio Carabella
- Release date: 1959
- Language: Italian

Knight Without a Country (Italian: Il cavaliere senza terra, also known as The Faceless Rider) is a 1959 Italian adventure film directed by Giacomo Gentilomo and starring Gérard Landry and Constance Smith.

== Cast ==
- Gérard Landry as Rolando
- Constance Smith as Laura
- Alberto Farnese as Rizziero, Duke of Villalta
- Giacomo Rossi Stuart as Ruggero
- Valeria Fabrizi as Countess of Holten
- Wandisa Guida
- Franco Fantasia
- Ivano Staccioli
- José Jaspe
- Gino Buzzanca
- Nino Marchesini
- Pietro Tordi
