= Room to Let (1950 film) =

- Opening titles
- Directed by: Godfrey Grayson
- Written by: Margery Allingham (radio drama); John Gilling; Godfrey Grayson
- Produced by: Anthony Hinds
- Starring: Jimmy Hanley; Valentine Dyall; Constance Smith
- Cinematography: Cedric Williams
- Edited by: James Needs
- Music by: Frank Spencer
- Production company: Hammer Films
- Distributed by: Exclusive Films
- Release date: 15 May 1950
- Running time: 68 minutes
- Country: United Kingdom
- Language: English

Room to Let is a 1950 British second feature ('B') historical thriller film directed by Godfrey Grayson and starring Jimmy Hanley, Valentine Dyall and Constance Smith. It was adapted by Grayson and John Gilling from the BBC radio play by Margery Allingham, broadcast in 1947.

This was Hammer Films' first foray into Gothic Horror.. This was also child actor Jimmy Hanley's first role as an adult heroic lead. Filming commenced on 6 October 1949 at Oakley Court, and the film was trade shown on 8 March 1950, and released on 15 May 1950.

== Plot ==
After a fire at an insane asylum during the Edwardian era, a young journalist named Curly Minter becomes convinced that one of the patients has escaped and taken lodgings at a local middle-class household. The mysterious "Doctor Fell" comes to dominate the three women in the house – mother, daughter and maid – and increasingly shuts them off from all outside contact. Despite a lack of assistance from the authorities, the journalist suspects that the Doctor is in fact the notorious Jack the Ripper who is planning a fresh series of attacks. Curly and the police later find Dr. Fell shot dead in his room with the room's only door and window locked from the inside, but there is no gun to be found and the key is inside the room with the corpse! The film then becomes a locked-room murder mystery, as Curly attempts to discover how Dr. Fell died.

== Cast ==
- Jimmy Hanley as Curly Minter
- Valentine Dyall as Doctor Fell
- Christine Silver as Mrs. Musgrave
- Merle Tottenham as Alice
- Constance Smith as Molly Musgrave
- Charles Hawtrey as Mike Atkinson
- Aubrey Dexter as Harding
- Anthony La Penna as JJ
- Reginald Dyson as Sergeant Cranbourne
- Laurence Naismith as editor
- John Clifford as Atkinson
- Stuart Saunders as porter
- Cyril Conway as Doctor Mansfield
- Charles Houston as Tom
- Harriet Petworth as matron
- Charles Mander as P.C. Smith
- H. Hamilton Earle as orderly
- F. A. Williams as butler
- Archie Callum as night watchman

== Critical reception ==
The Monthly Film Bulletin wrote: "Valentine Dyall is suitably sinister in this Victorian period piece, but the film is protracted and tedious."

Picturegoer wrote: "As a film, it has very little out of the ordinary to commend it .... The story has an unusual ending, which is not, unfortunately, entirely convincing. Constance Smith, a newcomer to the screen, deals rather more than adequately with a part that does not constitute an exactly ideal opening to her career, and looks quite charming in Victorian costume."

Picture Show wrote: "Effective but rather grim."

In British Sound Films: The Studio Years 1928–1959 David Quinlan rated the film as "mediocre", writing: "Well-acted; tedious at times."

The Radio Times Guide to Films gave the film 2/5 stars, writing: "Hammer Films took a step towards its future speciality with this early B-feature ... Modest, but enjoyable. "

TV Guide gave the film two out of five stars, calling it "A fairly disturbing programmer which remains suspenseful to the end."
