= Lina Marengo =

Italian character actress

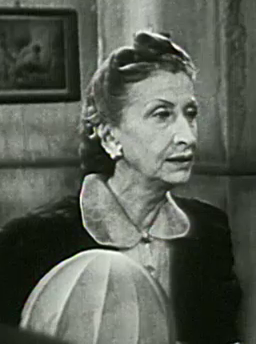
- Lina Marengo in the movie Non ti pago! (1942)
- Born: 19 January 1911; Rome, Kingdom of Italy
- Died: 6 February 1987 (aged 76); Rome, Italy
- Occupation: Character actress
- Years active: 1935–1953

Lina Marengo (19 January 1911 – 6 February 1987) was an Italian character actress. She played in over 30 films, and was most active between 1938 and 1943.

== Biography ==
Marengo was born in Rome and her film debut was in Casta Diva (1935), directed by Carmine Gallone.

Characterized by a slightly hoarse voice, she was mainly active in humorous roles, and was often typecast as a spinster or a gossiping woman. She played Serafina in Domani è troppo tardi (1950), directed by Léonide Moguy, and starring Vittorio De Sica, Lois Maxwell, Gabrielle Dorziat, and Pier Angeli. The film won Best Italian Film at the Venice Film Festival. She was in four films directed by De Sica, including Teresa Venerdì (1941). Her final film was La passeggiata, directed by Renato Rascel, and starring Renato Rascel, Valentina Cortese, and Paolo Stoppa.

Marengo was also active in theater, though in supporting roles.

She died in Rome.

== Partial filmography ==
- Casta Diva (1935)
- Adam's Tree (1936)
- La vedova (1939)
- Kean (1940)
- Lucrezia Borgia (1940)
- Teresa Venerdì (1941)
- È caduta una donna (1941)
- Non ti pago! (1942)
- I due Foscari (1942)
- L'ippocampo (1943)
- Domani è troppo tardi (1950)
- La passeggiata (1953)
