= List of compositions by Miklós Rózsa =

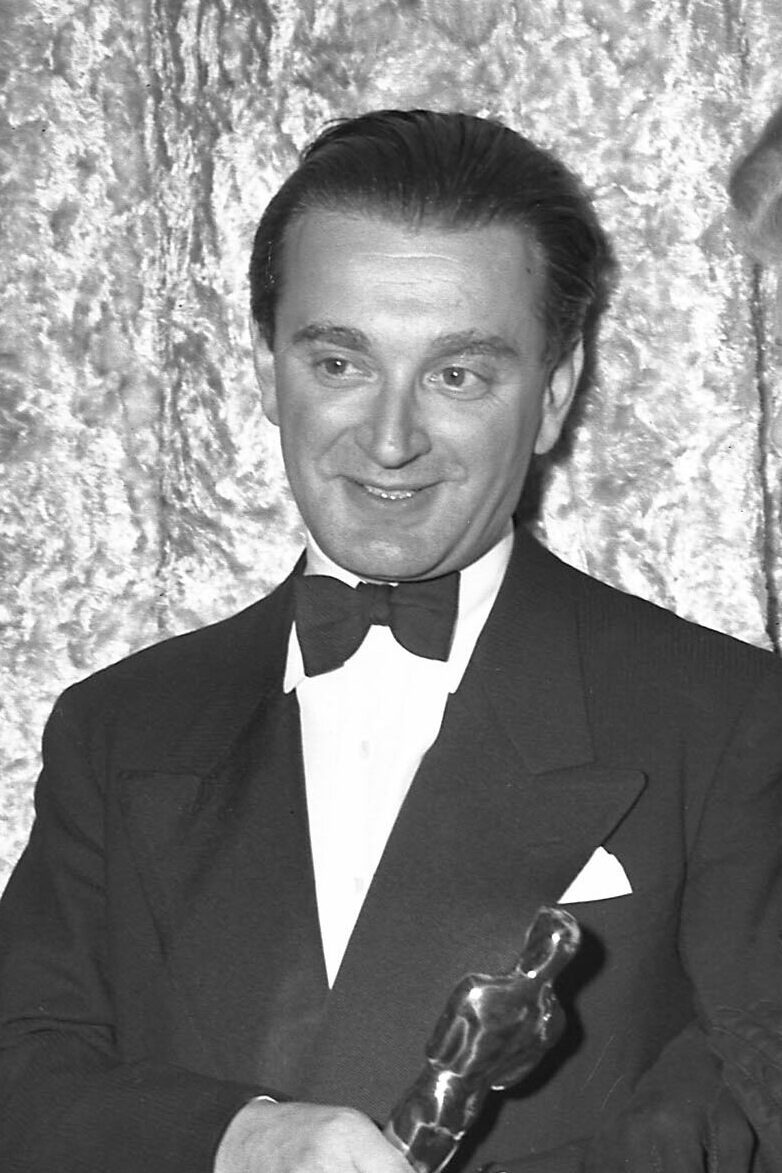
Rózsa holding his Oscar for Spellbound at the 18th Academy Awards (1946)

This is a list of compositions by Miklós Rózsa.

== Orchestral ==
- Theme, Variations and Finale, Op. 13 (1933, revised in 1966 as Op. 13a)
- Three Hungarian Sketches, Op. 14 (1938, revised in 1958 as Op. 14a)
- Concerto for String Orchestra, Op. 17 (1943)
- Hungarian Serenade, Op. 25 (1945)
- Kaleidoscope - six short pieces for small orchestra, Op. 19a (1957)
- The Vintner's Daughter - twelve variations on a French folk song, Op. 23a (1953)
- Overture to a Symphony Concert, Op. 26 (recorded 1955, revised in 1963 as Op. 26a)
- Notturno Ungherese, Op. 28 (1964)
- Tripartita for Orchestra, Op. 33 (1972)
- Festive Flourish (1975)
- Symphony in Three Movements, Op. 6a (1933-1993; unpublished)

== Concertante ==
- Rhapsody for cello and orchestra, Op. 3 (1929)
- Variations on a Hungarian Folk Song for violin and orchestra, Op. 4 (1929)
- North Hungarian Peasant Songs and Dances for violin and orchestra, Op. 5 (1929)
- Violin Concerto, Op. 24 (1953)
- Sinfonia Concertante for violin, cello and orchestra, Op. 29 (1966)
- Tema con variazioni for violin, cello and orchestra, Op. 29a (1962)
- Piano Concerto, Op. 31 (1967)
- Cello Concerto, Op. 32 (1968)
- Viola Concerto, Op. 37 (1982)
- Concerto for 2 pianos and orchestra "New England" (1984)

== Chamber music ==
- String Trio, Op. 1 (1927)
- Quintet for piano and string quartet, Op. 2 (1928)
- Duo for violin and piano, Op. 7 (1931)
- Duo for cello and piano, Op. 8 (1931)
- Sonata for two violins, Op. 15 (1933, revised in 1973 as Op. 15a)
- String Quartet No. 1, Op. 22 (1950)
- String Quartet No. 2, Op. 38 (1981)

=== Chamber versions of concertante works ===
- Rhapsody for cello and piano, Op. 3
- Variations on a Hungarian Folk Song for violin and piano, Op. 4
- North Hungarian Peasant Songs and Dances for violin and piano, Op. 5
- Violin Concerto for violin and piano, Op. 24
- Piano Concerto for two pianos, Op. 31
- Cello Concerto for cello and piano, Op. 32
- Viola Concerto for viola and piano, Op. 37

=== Chamber versions of film scores ===
- El Cid Selection for string quartet (Arr. by Mahasti Kamdar)
- Spellbound Concerto for theremin, piano, oboe and string quartet (Arr. by Alphonso D'Artega)

== Works for solo instruments ==
- Sonatina for clarinet solo, Op. 27 (1951)
- Toccata Capricciosa for cello, Op. 36 (1977)
- Sonata for flute solo, Op. 39 (1983)
- Sonata for violin solo, Op. 40 (1986)
- Sonata for clarinet solo, Op. 41 (1986)
- Sonata for guitar, Op. 42 (1986)
- Sonata for oboe solo, Op. 43 (1987)
- Introduction and Allegro for viola solo, Op. 44 (1988)
- Sonatina for Ondes Martenot, Op. 45 (1989)

== Piano music ==
- Variations pour piano, Op. 9 (1932)
- Bagatelles (Little Pieces for Play & Dance), Op. 12 (1933)
- Kaleidoscope, Op. 19 (1946)
- Piano Sonata, Op. 20 (1948)
- The Vintner's Daughter - twelve variations on a French folk song, Op. 23 (1952)

== Vocal music ==
- Five Songs for voice and piano
  - Invocation, Op. 16a (1940) for contralto
  - Beasts of Burden, Op. 16b (1940) for contralto
  - My Little Town (1972) for soprano or tenor
  - The Land Where My Heart Lies (1972) for soprano or tenor
  - High Flight (1942-1974) for tenor
- Two choruses for female voices a cappella, Op. 18 (1946)
  - Lullaby
  - Madrigal of Spring
- To Everything There Is a Season - motet for 8-part mixed chorus with optional organ or piano, Op. 21 (1946)
- The Vanities of Life - motet for 8-part mixed chorus with optional organ or piano, Op. 30 (1967)
- The Lord Is My Shepherd for 4-part mixed chorus a cappella based on the Psalm 23, Op. 34 (1972)
- Three Chinese Poems for mixed chorus a cappella, Op. 35 (1975)
  - Sailing Homeward
  - Swallow, Swallow
  - The Cuckoo

== Concert versions of film scores ==
All versions are suites; exceptions are noted.

- The Thief of Baghdad (1940)
- Love Theme from Lady Hamilton (1941)
- Love Theme and Waltz from Lady Hamilton (1941)
- The Jungle Book for narrator and orchestra (1942)
- Lullaby from The Jungle Book for mixed chorus a cappella (1942)
- Sahara (1943)
- Double Indemnity (1944)
- The Lost Weekend (1945)
- Spellbound Concerto (1946) in multiple versions
  - Full orchestral version (1946)
  - Piano and orchestra (1946)
  - Theremin, piano, oboe and string quartet (1946, arranged by Alphonso D'Artega for Lucie Bigelow Rosen)
  - Concerto Fantasy for two pianos and orchestra (1984)
- The Strange Love of Martha Ivers (1946)
- The Killers (1946)
- The Red House (1947)
- Mark Hellinger (1948)
- The Madame Bovary Waltz (1949)
- Quo Vadis (both orchestral and choral suites) (1951)
- Hail Nero and Triumphal March from Quo Vadis for concert band or brass band (1951)
- Ivanhoe (1952)
- Lust for Life (1956)
- Ben-Hur (1959)
  - Orchestral suite
  - Choral suite
  - For wind orchestra
- Choral suite from King of Kings (1961)
- Resurrection and Finale from King of Kings (1961)
- El Cid
  - Suite (1963)
  - Overture and March
  - Selection for string quartet
- Finale from Providence (1977)
- The Tunnel from The Last Embrace (1979)
- Dead Men Don't Wear Plaid (1982)
- New England Concerto for two pianos and orchestra featuring themes from Lydia and Time Out of Mind (1984)
- Fantasy on themes from Young Bess for organ, harp, brass and timpani (1984)
- Suite in the Olden Style

== Film scores ==
- Knight Without Armour (1937)
- The Squeaker (Murder on Diamond Row) (1937)
- Thunder in the City (1937)
- The Green Cockatoo (1937)
- The Divorce of Lady X (1938); music also by Lionel Salter
- The Four Feathers (1939)
- On the Night of the Fire (The Fugitive) (1939)
- The Spy in Black (1939)
- Ten Days in Paris (1940)
- The Thief of Bagdad (1940)
- New Wine (The Great Awakening) (1941)
- Lydia (1941)
- Sundown (1941)
- That Hamilton Woman (1941)
- Jacaré (As musical director) (1942)
- Jungle Book (1942)
- To Be or Not to Be (1942); music also by Werner R. Heymann
- Five Graves to Cairo (1943)
- Sahara (1943)
- So Proudly We Hail! (1943); music also by Edward Heyman
- The Woman of the Town (1943)
- Dark Waters (1944)
- Double Indemnity (1944)
- The Hour Before the Dawn (1944)
- Blood on the Sun (1945)
- Lady on a Train (1945)
- The Lost Weekend (1945)
- The Man in Half Moon Street (1945)
- A Song to Remember (1945)
- Spellbound (1945)
- Because of Him (1946)
- The Killers (1946)
- The Strange Love of Martha Ivers (1946)
- Brute Force (1947)
- Desert Fury (1947)
- A Double Life (1947)
- The Macomber Affair (1947)
- The Other Love (1947)
- The Red House (1947)
- Song of Scheherazade (1947)
- Time Out of Mind (1947)
- Kiss the Blood Off My Hands (1948)
- The Naked City (1948); music also by Frank Skinner
- Secret Beyond the Door (1948)
- A Woman's Vengeance (1948)
- Adam's Rib (1949); music also by Cole Porter
- The Bribe (1949)
- Command Decision (1949)
- Criss Cross (1949)
- East Side, West Side (1949)
- Madame Bovary (1949)
- The Red Danube (1949)
- The Asphalt Jungle (1950)
- Crisis (1950)
- The Miniver Story (1950); music also by Herbert Stothart
- Quo Vadis (1951)
- Ivanhoe (1952)
- The Light Touch (1952)
- Plymouth Adventure (1952)
- All the Brothers Were Valiant (1953)
- Julius Caesar (1953)
- Knights of the Round Table (1953)
- The Story of Three Loves (1953)
- Young Bess (1953)
- Beau Brummell (1954); Main and end titles, score composed by Richard Addinsell
- Green Fire (1954)
- Men of the Fighting Lady (1954)
- Seagulls Over Sorrento (1954)
- Valley of the Kings (1954)
- The King's Thief (1955)
- Moonfleet (1955); music also by Vicente Gómez
- Bhowani Junction (1956)
- Diane (1956)
- Lust for Life (1956)
- Tribute to a Bad Man (1956)
- Something of Value (1957)
- Tip on a Dead Jockey (1957)
- The Seventh Sin (1957)
- A Time to Love and a Time to Die (1958)
- Ben-Hur (1959)
- The World, the Flesh and the Devil (1959)
- King of Kings (1961)
- El Cid (1961)
- Sodom and Gomorrah (1963)
- The V.I.P.s (1963)
- The Power (1968)
- The Green Berets (1968)
- The Private Life of Sherlock Holmes (1970)
- The Golden Voyage of Sinbad (1974)
- The Private Files of J. Edgar Hoover (1977)
- Providence (1977)
- Fedora (1978)
- Last Embrace (1979)
- Time After Time (1979)
- Eye of the Needle (1981)
- Dead Men Don't Wear Plaid (1982)
