= The Width of the Pavement =

1956 film by Léonide Moguy

The Width of the Pavement is a 1956 French film directed by Léonide Moguy.

It was also known as Le long des trottoirs and Diary of a Bad Girl.

== Cast ==
- Anne Vernon
- Danik Patisson
- François Guérin
