= The Devil Makes Three =

The Devil Makes Three may refer to:

- The Devil Makes Three (band), an American band
- The Devil Makes Three (film), a 1952 film
