= Jeffrey Hayden =

American TV producer-director (1926–2016)

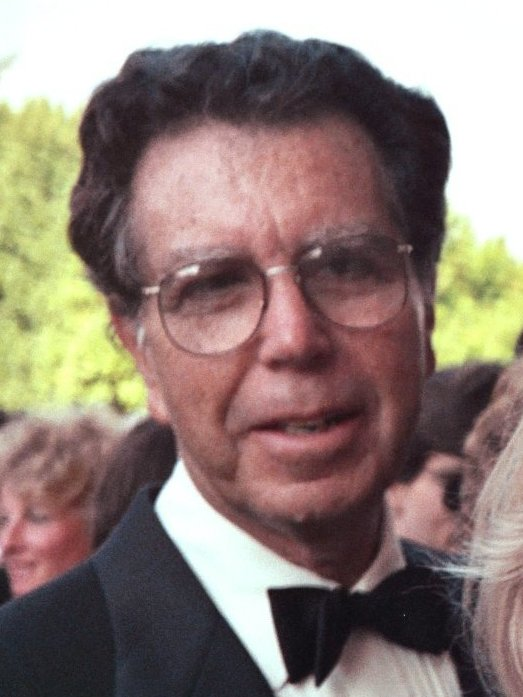
- Hayden in 1990
- Born: Raphael Levine; October 15, 1926; New York City, New York, US
- Died: December 24, 2016 (aged 90); Los Angeles, California, US
- Occupations: Television director; television producer
- Years active: 1948–1996
- Spouse: Eva Marie Saint (m. 1951)
- Children: 2

Jeffrey Hayden (born Raphael Levine; October 15, 1926 – December 24, 2016) was an American television director and producer. He was married to actress Eva Marie Saint from 1951 until his death in 2016.

== Television career ==
Hayden was born in New York City. His career as a director began in the late 1950s, when he directed the only feature film to his credit, The Vintage (1957), starring Pier Angeli and Mel Ferrer. He then turned to television, beginning with episodes of Leave It to Beaver and 77 Sunset Strip.

Hayden directed episodes of dozens of TV series from the 1960s into the 1990s, including such popular programs as The Andy Griffith Show, Burke's Law, Batman, Knight Rider, Magnum, P.I., and In the Heat of the Night.

== Personal life and death ==
On October 28, 1951, Hayden married screen actress Eva Marie Saint. The couple had a son and a daughter and four grandchildren.

Shortly before their 50th anniversary, on October 13, 2001, the couple appeared together in a one-night-only performance of the play Love Letters at Bowling Green State University, Saint's alma mater.

Hayden died from cancer in Los Angeles, on December 24, 2016, at the age of 90.

== Selected works ==
- In the Heat of the Night
- Misfits of Science
- Knight Rider
- Cover Up
- Santa Barbara (Co-executive producer)
- Legmen
- The Mississippi
- Emerald Point N.A.S.
- The Powers of Matthew Star
- Magnum, P.I.
- Mr. Merlin
- Falcon Crest
- Quincy M.E.
- CBS Afternoon Playhouse: "The Great Gilly Hopkins"
- Palmerstown, U.S.A.
- From Here to Eternity
- The Incredible Hulk
- The Bad News Bears
- The Curse of Dracula
- The Runaways
- Space Academy
- ABC Weekend Special: "The Ransom of Red Chief"
- Amy Prentiss
- Mannix
- Alias Smith and Jones
- Ironside
- Longstreet
- The Virginian
- Matt Lincoln
- The Courtship of Eddie's Father
- Love, American Style
- Dundee and the Culhane
- Batman
- Shane
- That Girl
- Disneyland
- Peyton Place
- The Andy Griffith Show
- Route 66
- Burke's Law
- Redigo
- McKeever and the Colonel
- 77 Sunset Strip
- Saints and Sinners
- The Dick Powell Show
- The Lloyd Bridges Show
- Surfside 6
- Leave It to Beaver
- The Donna Reed Show
- Lassie
- Johnny Staccato
- The Vintage
- The Chocolate Soldier
