= Tomorrow Is Another Day (1951 Italian film) =

- Film poster
- Directed by: Léonide Moguy
- Written by: Oreste Biancoli; Sara Gasco; Domenico Meccoli; Léonide Moguy; Giorgio Prosperi
- Produced by: Isidoro Broggi
- Starring: Pier Angeli; Aldo Silvani; Anna Maria Ferrero
- Cinematography: G. R. Aldo
- Edited by: Lionello Massobrio
- Music by: Franco Mannino
- Production company: Excelsa Film
- Distributed by: Minerva Film
- Release date: 24 January 1951
- Running time: 115 minutes
- Country: Italy
- Language: Italian

Tomorrow Is Another Day (Italian: Domani è un altro giorno) is a 1951 Italian melodrama film directed by Léonide Moguy and starring Pier Angeli, Aldo Silvani and Anna Maria Ferrero. It was produced as a follow-up to the hit film Tomorrow Is Too Late also directed by Moguy and starring Angeli in her screen debut. Afterwards Angeli moved to Hollywood as a contract star of MGM.

== Plot ==
While she was contemplating committing suicide by drowning, a young woman is stopped by a doctor whose job, all night long, is to save people who try to commit suicide. Insistently, the doctor convinces the girl to follow him around her.

Once they arrive at the hospital, the two listen to the story of a girl who, left alone, had been exploited by a man who initially showed himself good but who later turned out to be unscrupulous. The girl had tried to kill herself but was saved while her exploiter was arrested; repentant of her previous gesture, the girl repeats «I want to live, I want to live».

Another girl tells her story at home: after becoming pregnant with a young man who did not love her, she refused the abortion and decided to raise the child alone but her mother, fearing a scandal, had stolen the newborn. The young woman then took some pills, but when she woke up she found her son next to her.

After hearing other stories as well, the young woman she wanted to drown herself realizes that she has to live her life to the fullest. The title derives in fact from the popular expression, which indicates that tomorrow always holds a new dawn.

== Cast ==
- Pier Angeli as Luisa
- Aldo Silvani as Medico dell'ambulanza
- Anna Maria Ferrero as Giulia
- Laura Gore as Linda
- Arnoldo Foà as Cesare
- Rossana Podestà as Stefania
- Olga Solbelli as Madre di Giulia
- Roberto Risso as Paolo
- Franca Tamantini as Lola
- Mario Riva as Pasquale
- Rina De Liguoro as Rosa
- Bianca Doria
- Giovanna Galletti as Madre di Luisa
- Attilio Torelli
- Giulio Battiferri
- Giuseppe Chinnici as Commissario di polizia
- Charlie Beal as Il pianista alla festa nella villa
- Liana Billi as Madre del macellaio
- Bianca Maria Cerasoli
- Renato Marozzi as Ragioniere Bertolozzi
- Nadia Niver as Una giovane madre
- Teresa Pollio
- Leonello Ponti
- Lina Rossoni as Ostetrica
- Lamberti Sorrentino as Giornalista
- Amedeo Trilli as Mecellaio

== Bibliography ==
- Chiti, Roberto & Poppi, Roberto. Dizionario del cinema italiano: Dal 1945 al 1959. Gremese Editore, 1991.
- Moliterno, Gino. Historical Dictionary of Italian Cinema. Scarecrow Press, 2008.
