= Two Women (disambiguation) =

Two Women (Italian: La Ciociara) is a 1960 Italian film directed by Vittorio De Sica based on the 1957 novel.

Two Women may also refer to:

- Two Women (novel) (Italian: La Ciociara), a 1957 novel by Alberto Moravia
- Two Women (1919 film), an American film starring Anita Stewart
- Two Women (1938 film), a German film directed by Hans H. Zerlett
- Two Women (1940 film), a French film directed by Léonide Moguy
- Two Women (1947 film), a Swedish film directed by Arnold Sjöstrand
- Two Women (1975 film), an Egyptian film directed by Hassan Ramzi
- Two Women (1992 film), an Algerian film directed by Omar Trebach
- Two Women (1999 film), a Persian film
- Two Women (2014 film), a Russian film directed by Vera Glagoleva
- Two Women (2025 film), a Canadian film directed by Chloé Robichaud
- Two Women, a painting by Francisco Goya
- Two Women, a painting by Paul Gauguin
- Two Women (opera) (Italian: La Ciociara), Marco Tutino based on the novel
