= The Walk (1953 film) =

1953 Italian comedy-drama film by Renato Rascel

- Directed by: Renato Rascel
- Screenplay by: Turi Vasile; Diego Fabbri; Ugo Guerra; Giorgio Prosperi; Franco Rossi; Cesare Zavattini; Enzo Curreli; Renato Rascel
- Starring: Renato Rascel; Valentina Cortese
- Cinematography: Vaclav Vich
- Music by: Giovanni Militello
- Release date: 1953
- Country: Italy
- Language: Italian

The Walk (Italian: La passeggiata) is a 1953 Italian comedy-drama film directed by Renato Rascel and starring Rascel, Valentina Cortese and Paolo Stoppa. It is very loosely based on Nikolai Gogol's short story Nevsky Prospekt. It grossed 148 million lire at the Italian box office.

== Plot ==
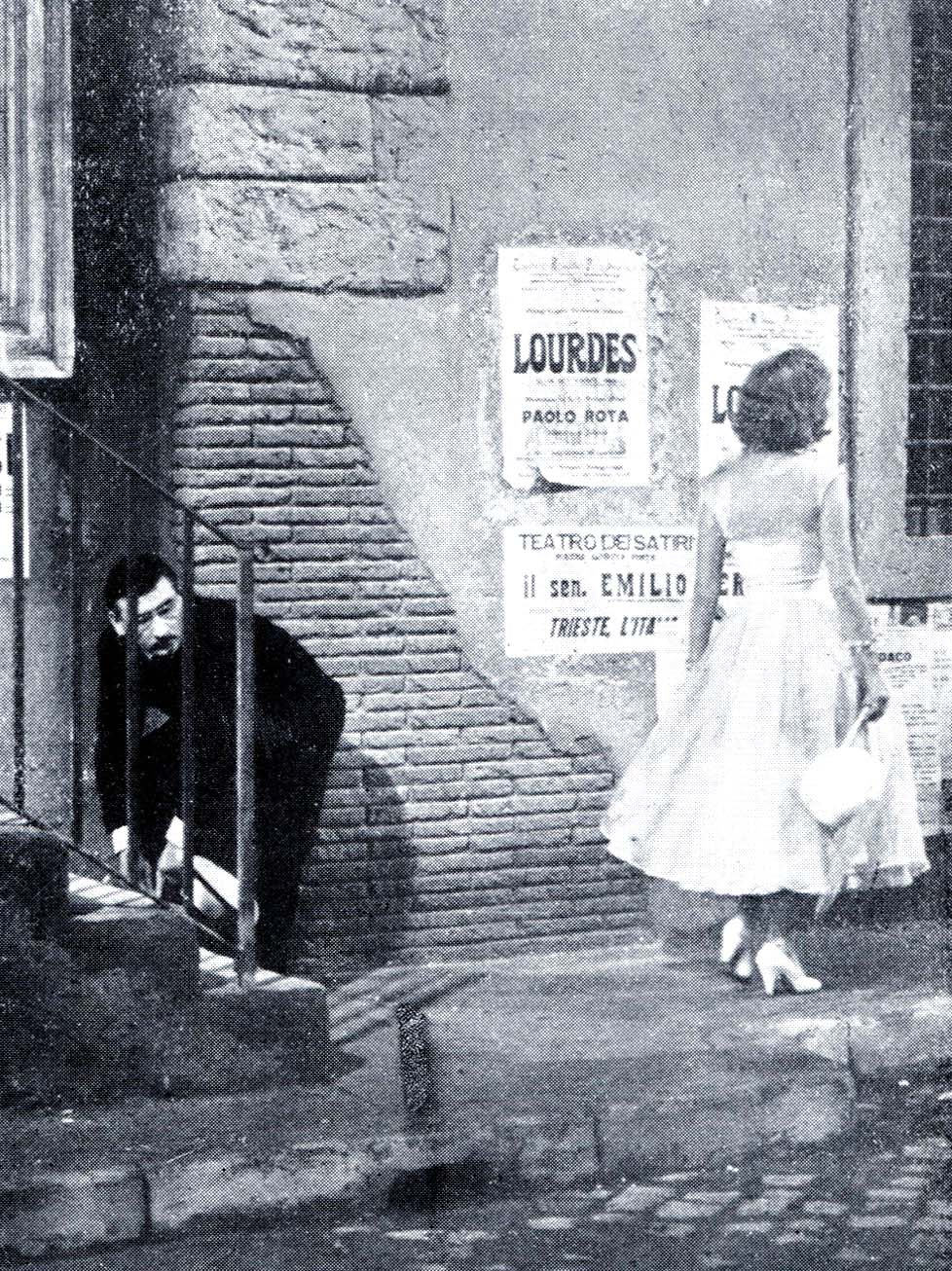
Renato Rascel crouching behind Valentina Cortese in a still from the film.

A timid schoolteacher attempts to fall in love with a prostitute. In the process he loses his position. He finds that she is hard to convince.

== Cast ==
- Renato Rascel as Paolo Barbato
- Valentina Cortese as Lisa
- Paolo Stoppa as Headmaster of the College
- Peppino De Martino as Luigi Magri
- Francesco Mulé as Teacher
- Anna Maria Bottini as Lisa's Friend
- Lia Angeleri as Teacher
- Tino Bianchi as Teacher
- Ignazio Leone as Teacher
- Enzo Maggio
- Lina Marengo
