= Give Me My Chance =

1957 film by Léonide Moguy

Give Me My Chance is a 1957 French film co-written and directed by Léonide Moguy.

It was known as Donnez-moi ma chance.

== Cast ==
- Ivan Desny
- François Guérin
- Michèle Mercier
