= Port Afrique =

1956 film

- Directed by: Rudolph Maté
- Written by: Frank Partos; John Cresswell
- Based on: Port Afrique by Bernard Victor Dryer
- Produced by: David Rose; John R. Sloan
- Starring: Pier Angeli; Philip Carey; Dennis Price
- Cinematography: Wilkie Cooper
- Edited by: Raymond Poulton
- Music by: Malcolm Arnold
- Production company: Coronado Productions
- Distributed by: Columbia Pictures
- Release date: 21 August 1956
- Running time: 92 minutes
- Country: United Kingdom
- Language: English

Port Afrique is a 1956 British drama film directed by Rudolph Maté and starring Pier Angeli, Philip Carey and Dennis Price as Robert Blackton. It was written by John Cresswell based on the 1948 novel of the same name by Bernard Victor Dryer.

== Synopsis ==
Set in July 1945, the film tells the story of a returning American pilot named Rip Reardon who lost his leg during the war and a young woman, Ynez, who is accused of the murder of Rip's wife.

== Cast ==
- Pier Angeli as Ynez
- Philip Carey as Rip Reardon
- Dennis Price as Robert Blackton
- Eugene Deckers a Colonel Moussac
- James Hayter as Nino
- Anthony Newley as Pedro
- Richard Molinas as Captain
- Christopher Lee as Franz Vermes
- Guy De Monceau as police driver
- Jacques Cey as waiter
- Dorothy White as Berber girl
- Denis Shaw as Grila
- Marie Hanson as Georgette
- Rachel Gurney as Diane Blackton
- Guido Lorraine as Abdul
- André Maranne as police officer
- Lorenza Colville as Bouala
- Maureen Connell as native model
- Eric Lindsay as Senegalese boy
- Auric Lorand as sentry
- Larry Taylor as first Arab
- George Leech as second Arab
- Andreas Malandrinos as Gardner
- Pat O'Meara as guitarist

== Production ==
The film was made at Shepperton Studios with sets designed by the art director Wilfred Shingleton. It was filmed on location in the Casbah in Algiers and in Tangiers and Morocco.

== Reception ==
The Monthly Film Bulletin wrote: "A slow and hackneyed murder mystery. The characterisation is shallow and familiar, and the identification of the "county" Diane as the killer strikes a distinctly incongruous note. Phil Carey is no more than adequate as the sullen hero, and Pier Angeli appears embarrassed by her part as the Spanish singer. The French Moroccan location work provides a welcome breath of fresh air."

Kine Weekly wrote: "The picture has colourful, as well as authentic, backgrounds and the warm and sunny exteriors and intriguing interiors – the night haunt scenes, complete with dancing girls and songs, are most decorative – create atmosphere and help to smooth its rough edges. Pier Angeli Sings haunting tunes and keeps the audience guessing as Ynez, and Phil Carey displays plenty of fight, despite a limp, as Rip, but Eugene Deckers talks too much as Moussac, and James Hayter, Dennis Price and Rachel Gurney are somewhat stagy as Nino, Blackton and Diane. The finale is, however, showmanlike and amply atones for its shortcomings."

In British Sound Films: The Studio Years 1928–1959 David Quinlan rated the film as "mediocre", writing: "Plodding mystery with ill-at-ease stars."
