= The Cat Shows Her Claws =

1960 film

- Directed by: Henri Decoin
- Written by: Henri Decoin; Jacques Rémy; Eugène Tucherer
- Produced by: Eugène Tucherer; Robert Woog
- Starring: Françoise Arnoul; Horst Frank; François Guérin
- Cinematography: Pierre Montazel
- Edited by: Claude Durand
- Music by: Joseph Kosma
- Production companies: Paris Elysées Films; Films Metzger et Woog; Films Balar
- Distributed by: Discifilm
- Release date: 9 March 1960
- Running time: 102 minutes
- Country: France
- Language: French

The Cat Shows Her Claws (French: La chatte sort ses griffes) is a 1960 French war drama film directed by Henri Decoin and starring Françoise Arnoul, Horst Frank and François Guérin. It was shot at the Billancourt Studios in Paris and on location around Paris including Montmartre. It is the sequel to the 1958 film The Cat about the French Resistance.

== Synopsis ==
Cora Menessier is sentenced to death by the Resistance in 1944 for an alleged betrayal. After her execution she is left for dead, but is recovered by the Germans who brainwash her and plan to use her as a counter-agent. They release her to target a Resistance operation designed to blow up a train carrying V1s to be used to bombard London and the English coast.

== Cast ==
- Françoise Arnoul as Cora Menessier dite La Chatte
- Horst Frank as Major von Hollwitz
- François Guérin as Louis
- Harold Kay as Charles
- Françoise Spira as Marie-José
- Jacques Fabbri as Gustave - le chef du réseau Sud
- Bernard La Jarrige as Dalmier dit Athos
- Michel Jourdan as Tonio
- Anne Tonietti as Maud
- Chris Van Loosen as Clara
- Gérard Darrieu as Jean-Lou
- Jean-Pierre Zola as Un officier allemand
- France Asselin as Madame Buisson
- Liliane Patrick as La secrétaire de Dalmier
- Ginette Pigeon as L'infirmière allemande
- Anna Gaylor as Mademoiselle Lepage - l'assistante sociale
- Albert Médina as Le patron du restaurant
- Gabriel Gobin as Le conducteur de la locomotive
- Jean Berton as Le cheminot résistant
- Robert Berri as Le chauffeur du camion lors de l'accident simulé
- Robert Le Fort as Un cheminot
- Albert Michel as Un cheminot
- Georges Atlas as Le barman
- Marie Glory as La concierge
- Werner Peters as Le général allemand

== Bibliography ==
- Maurice Bessy & Raymond Chirat. Histoire du cinéma français: 1956-1960. Pygmalion, 1990.
