= Allan Grant =

American photojournalist

Allan Grant (October 23, 1919 – February 1, 2008) was an American photojournalist for Life magazine. He had the last photo shoot with actress Marilyn Monroe and took the first photos of Marina Oswald, Lee Harvey Oswald's wife, following U.S. President John F. Kennedy's assassination.

== Early career ==
Grant was born in New York City. He was introduced to photography as a teenager, when he traded a model airplane for a camera.

One of his early jobs was in a photo laboratory, where he printed photos by noted photographers such as Alfred Eisenstaedt and Robert Capa.

Grant began working for Life in 1945 on a freelance basis. The magazine hired him full-time in 1946, after a photo he took at a Connecticut sailing school made the cover of an issue.

== Life assignments ==
In 1947, Grant photographed Howard Hughes flight in the "Spruce Goose," and he filmed the atom bomb tests in Nevada during the 1950s.

In 1948, Grant photographed Chano Pozo, then a member of Dizzy Gillespie's band, in New York, shortly before he was murdered. Grant produced a photo shoot with Italian actress Anna Maria Pierangeli (better known as Pier Angeli) which was able to make Grant's first cover of Life magazine in the July 12, 1954 issue.

At the 1955 Academy Awards, he photographed Grace Kelly and Audrey Hepburn as they awaited the "Best Actress" announcement backstage.

During the fire that swept through Bel Air, California, in 1961, Grant photographed then-former Vice President Richard Nixon standing on top of the roof of his rented house with a water hose, wearing a tie and slacks.

Photographs Grant took of Marilyn Monroe during a photo shoot in her home were used to illustrate a profile of the actress in Life's August 3, 1962, issue. Monroe died the week the issue appeared on newsstands.

When President John F. Kennedy was shot in Dallas in November 1963, Grant accompanied Life reporter Thomas Thompson to Texas. The two men began a search for Oswald's family and located Marina Oswald, her two children, Oswald's mother Marguerite and his brother Robert in Irving, Texas, at the home of Ruth Hyde Paine.

Paine, who spoke Russian, served as interpreter for Grant and Thompson. As Thompson persuaded Oswald's family to accompany them to Dallas in exchange for help in obtaining the right to visit Oswald in jail, Grant took photos for what they thought would be a Life exclusive. The next issue contained several photos of Kennedy's family but only one small photo of Marina.

== Post-Life career ==
Grant left Life magazine in the late 1960s and began producing educational documentaries.

What Color is the Wind?, a film Grant made for television that was based on a Life magazine article about two boys, one born blind, received three Emmy nominations.

Grant died at his Brentwood, California, home of Parkinson's-related pneumonia.

== Personal life ==
Grant had two sons, Ron and Richard Grant, with his first wife, and a daughter, Kristina Grant, with his third wife, Karin .
