= White Slave Ship =

- Directed by: Silvio Amadio
- Starring: Pier Angeli; Edmund Purdom
- Cinematography: Aldo Giordani
- Music by: Les Baxter; Angelo Francesco Lavagnino
- Distributed by: American International Pictures (US)
- Release dates: 1961 (IT); 1962 (US)
- Country: Italy
- Language: English

White Slave Ship is a 1961 film directed by Silvio Amadio and starring Pier Angeli and Edmund Purdom. Titled L'ammutinamento on its original Italian release, it was released in the United States in 1962.

== Plot ==
Set in 1675, the film was about a group of convicts being transported from London to the New World as white slaves aboard the ship Albatross, captained by Isaac Cooper (Ivan Desny). Among the convicts held in chains below decks are Doctor Robert Bradley, a political prisoner being transported to the American colonies for treating a wounded rebel (Purdom); Polly, a prostitute (Pier Angeli) and a murderer, John Rackham (Armand Mestral). Above decks and living in comparative luxury are an upper class English family, the Medfords, including their beautiful daughter Anna (Michele Girardon). Halfway across the Atlantic; the prisoners escape and take over the ship. Robert Bradley saves Anna's life and, despite their very different stations in life, the two gradually fall in love.

== Cast ==
- Pier Angeli as Polly
- Edmund Purdom as Dr. Robert Bradley
- Armand Mestral as John Rackham
- Ivan Desny as Captain Isaac Cooper
- Michèle Girardon as Anna Medford
- Mirko Ellis as Lord Graveston
- Lee Madden as Doctor Who

== Production ==
White Slave Ship, a 1961 French-Italian co-production in TotalScope and Eastman Color, was purchased by American International Pictures in 1962, who dubbed the film into English and replaced the original music score by Angelo Lavagnino with one by Les Baxter. AIP released it in ColorScope and Pathe Color.
