= The Vintage =

1957 film by Jeffrey Hayden

- Theatrical release poster
- Directed by: Jeffrey Hayden
- Screenplay by: Michael Blankfort
- Based on: The Vintage; 1953 novel by Ursula Keir
- Produced by: Edwin H. Knopf
- Starring: Pier Angeli; Mel Ferrer; John Kerr
- Cinematography: Joseph Ruttenberg
- Edited by: Ben Lewis
- Music by: David Raksin
- Production company: MGM
- Distributed by: MGM
- Release date: May 8, 1957 (New York City)
- Running time: 92 minutes
- Country: United States
- Language: English
- Budget: $1,658,000
- Box office: $1,280,000

The Vintage is a 1957 American crime drama film directed by Jeffrey Hayden and starring Pier Angeli, Mel Ferrer, John Kerr, Michèle Morgan and Theodore Bikel. The screenplay was written by Michael Blankfort, based on a novel by Ursula Keir. The film was distributed by MGM.

== Plot ==
Italian brothers Ernesto and Giancarlo Barandero are fugitives, Ernesto having accidentally killed a man. They cross the border to France and hope to find work picking grapes.

While vineyard owner Louis Morel is away, wife Leonne and young sister-in-law Lucienne make the brothers feel welcome. Louis does not offer them a job, but Ernesto and Giancarlo are given temporary shelter in a shack where Louis' elderly uncle Tonton stays. They are brought food by Lucienne, whose interest makes her intended husband Etienne extremely jealous.

A crew of Spanish pickers led by Eduardo Uribon are willing to let the brothers work with them. Yolande, the young daughter of Louis and Leonne, comes upon Ernesto carving a sculpture of her mother. He asks her not to mention it.

The police are tipped off by Etienne to check on these two strangers, Etienne wanting the brothers to be gone. Louis decides to fire them, but Eduardo's crew have taken a liking to Ernesto and Giancarlo and refuse to work without them. Louis desperately needs this year's crop, so he concedes.

A chicken thief has been active and dogs are sent out, but they attack Giancarlo, incorrectly causing Louis to accuse him of being the thief. Lucienne now loves Giancarlo and comes to his defense. When the sculpture of Leonne carved by Ernesto is found by Louis, he accuses his wife of infidelity. She slaps his face.

It is revealed Uncle Tonton has been stealing the chickens, trading them to a merchant for chocolate. Giancarlo, no longer suspected, is told by Lucienne that if they marry, her dowry would be a small vineyard nearby. Ernesto realizes that Giancarlo could be happy here, so he decides to flee alone. The police arrive, however, and when young Yolande calls out his name, Ernesto is shot. Despite his sorrow, Giancarlo hopes he and Lucienne together can begin a new life.

== Cast ==
- Pier Angeli as Lucienne
- Mel Ferrer as Giancarlo Barandero
- John Kerr as Ernesto Barandero
- Michèle Morgan as Léonne Morel
- Theodore Bikel as Eduardo Uribari
- Leif Erickson as Louis Morel
- Jack Mullaney as Etienne Morel
- Joe Verdi as Uncle Ton Ton

== Music ==
The score for the film was composed and conducted by David Raksin. Additional source music included guitar solos performed by actor Theodore Bikel.

Raksin's music from the film received its premiere release, in any format, on CD in 2009 on Film Score Monthly records.

== Box office ==
According to MGM records the film earned $260,000 in the US and Canada and $1,020,000 elsewhere resulting in a loss of $1,072,000.
