= Bethsabée =

1947 film

- Directed by: Léonide Moguy
- Written by: Jacques Rémy; Roger Vitrac
- Based on: Bethsabée by Pierre Benoît
- Produced by: Raymond Borderie
- Starring: Danielle Darrieux; Georges Marchal; Jean Murat
- Cinematography: Nicolas Hayer
- Edited by: Borys Lewin
- Music by: Joseph Kosma
- Production companies: Compagnie Industrielle et Commerciale Cinématographique; Les Films Corona
- Distributed by: Les Films Corona
- Release date: 21 November 1947
- Running time: 90 minutes
- Country: France
- Language: French

Bethsabée is a 1947 French drama film directed by Léonide Moguy and starring Danielle Darrieux, Georges Marchal and Jean Murat. It is also known by the alternative title of Le deserteur. It is based on the 1938 novel of the same title by Pierre Benoît, set in French Morocco. The title is a reference to the biblical story of Bathsheba.

The film was shot at the Billancourt Studios in Paris. The sets were designed by the art directors Henri Ménessier and René Renoux.

== Plot ==
Arabella travels to French Morocco to join her fiancé, an officer serving with the spahis. One of the other officers is her former lover who knows all about her tumultuous past.

== Cast ==
- Danielle Darrieux as Arabella Delvert
- Georges Marchal as Captain Georges Dubreuil
- Jean Murat as Colonel de Cervière
- Paul Meurisse as Captain Lucien Sommervill
- Pierre-Louis as Lieutenant Testard
- Olivier Darrieux as Driver
- Nicolas Vogel as Adjutant
- Robert Darène as Major
- Andrée Clément as Evelyne de Cerviere

== Bibliography ==
- Goble, Alan. The Complete Index to Literary Sources in Film. Walter de Gruyter, 1999.
