= The Silver Chalice (film) =

1954 film by Victor Saville

- Film poster
- Directed by: Victor Saville
- Screenplay by: Lesser Samuels
- Based on: The Silver Chalice by Thomas B. Costain
- Produced by: Victor Saville
- Starring: Virginia Mayo; Pier Angeli; Jack Palance; Paul Newman
- Cinematography: William V. Skall
- Edited by: George White
- Music by: Franz Waxman
- Production company: Victor Saville Productions
- Distributed by: Warner Bros. Pictures
- Release date: December 20, 1954
- Running time: 135 minutes
- Country: United States
- Language: English
- Budget: $4.5 million (US)
- Box office: $3.2 million (US)

The Silver Chalice is a 1954 American epic historical drama film directed and produced by Victor Saville, based on Thomas B. Costain's 1952 novel of the same name. It was one of Saville's last films and marked the feature film debut of Paul Newman; despite being nominated for a Golden Globe Award for his performance, Newman later called it "the worst motion picture produced during the 1950s."

The film featured unusual semi-abstract settings and decor, created by the stage designer Rolfe Gerard in a striking departure from the normal practice of the day for Hollywood biblical epics. A notable musical score by Franz Waxman was nominated for the Best Original Score at the 27th Academy Awards.

== Plot ==
In 20 A.D., Ignatius, a wealthy Greek artisan from Antioch, adopts an orphaned boy and names him "Basil". In his new home, Basil befriends Helena, a young slave. Several years later, Basil matures into a young sculptor. When Ignatius dies, his brother Linus contests Basil's adoption and sells him as a slave. Basil argues he was Ignatius's legal heir, but all but one of the witnesses to Basil's adoption have since died.

Basil is imprisoned inside a prison cell. There, Luke the Evangelist, a disciple of Jesus, arrives to purchase Basil. Luke explains that Basil's sculptures have reached Jerusalem and wants to commission him. Linus later arrives at the cell intending to kill Basil, but finds that Basil has escaped. Meanwhile, Helena is an assistant to Simon the Magician. Impressed with Simon's magic, Mijamin, the leader of the Sicarii assassins, asks Simon to travel to Jerusalem, where he hopes to convert the Christians and Jews into a new religion and resist the Roman army. Convinced by this, Simon schemes to steal and destroy the Grail in front of Peter as revenge, as Peter once rebuked him.

In Jerusalem, Basil meets Joseph of Arimathea and his granddaughter Deborra. Joseph tasks him to create a silver chalice to hold the Grail. The casing is to be decorated with the faces of Jesus and the Apostles. While Basil works on the project, he is told that Helena will attend a public performance by Simon. Still in love with her, Basil, along with Deborra, attends the performance. While Simon performs magic in front of a crowd, he compares himself to Jesus. Deborra rebukes Simon for blasphemy, which incites the crowd. Roman soldiers arrive to arrest her, but Basil helps Deborra to evade capture.

Basil completes the chalice and presents it to Joseph. He later reunites with Helena, who refuses to leave Simon. Although in love with Helena, Basil marries Deborra in a private ceremony so she can legally inherit her grandfather's wealth. While Basil and Deborra leave for Antioch to collect Joseph's wealth, Simon and Mijamin raid the house for the Grail. However, they discover the chalice is gone so they pursue Basil and Deborra. Inside the camp, as Basil and Deborra sleep in separate tents, Mijamin steals the chalice, but Basil follows him and fights his men to regain it.

Basil leaves Deborra and the Grail in Antioch and proceeds to meet Peter in Rome. There, Simon performs an act before Nero. Having gained his favor, Nero agrees with Simon to have Peter arrested. Elsewhere, Basil meets with Kester, one of the witnesses to Basil's adoption. Kester hands Basil a token given to him as evidence of Basil's legal claim.

Basil meets with Peter and hands him the chalice, though Peter notices the chalice does not have the face of Jesus engraved. Basil states he had tried and is summoned to Nero's palace, where Simon proclaims he will fly from a 300 feet (91 m) tower. Tasked to sculpt Nero's face, Basil destroys it because of his newfound Christian faith. He next sculpts the face of Jesus.

The next day, Simon climbs the tower and falls to his death. Nero fears the crowd has been robbed of the spectacle and orders Helena to climb the tower and fly. After Helena dies, an angry crowd storms and loots Simon's house. Basil reunites with Deborra and professes his love for her. Peter informs Basil that the chalice has been stolen, and amidst the chaos, Basil finds a shard of the chalice next to Mijamin's corpse.

Later on, as Basil and Deborra prepare to sail to Antioch, Peter blesses them and prophesies that the Grail will reappear.

== Cast ==
- Virginia Mayo as Helena
- Pier Angeli as Deborra
- Jack Palance as Simon
- Paul Newman as Basil
- Walter Hampden as Joseph of Arimathea
- Joseph Wiseman as Mijamin
- Alexander Scourby as Luke
- Lorne Greene as Peter
- David J. Stewart as Adam
- Herbert Rudley as Linus
- Jacques Aubuchon as Nero
- E. G. Marshall as Ignatius
- Michael Pate as Aaron
- Natalie Wood as Helena, as a girl
- Peter Raynolds as Basil, as a boy
- Mort Marshall as Benjie
- Booth Colman as Hiram
- Terence De Marney as Sosthene
- Robert Middleton as Idbash
- Ian Wolfe as Theron
- Lawrence Dobkin as Ephraim
- Philip Tonge as Ohad
- Albert Dekker as Kester
- Beryl Machin as Eulalia
- Strother Martin as Father

== Release ==
The film had its world premiere in the small town of Saranac Lake, New York, which won a competition selling Christmas Seals. Saville, Mayo, Angeli and Palance attended and participated in a parade around the time of the town's annual winter carnival. The premiere was hosted by television personality Art Linkletter.

== Reception ==
A. H. Weiler of The New York Times wrote that the filmmakers "have come up with a spectacle-filled adventure easily fitted to the lush hues of WarnerColor and the king-sized screen of Cinemascope. But in providing a modicum of excitement and generous portions of extravaganza they have turned out a cumbersome and sometimes creaking vehicle that takes too long to reach its goal."

Variety wrote, "Like the Costain book, the picture is overdrawn and sometimes tedious, but producer-director Victor Saville still manages to instill interest in what's going on, and even hits a feeling of excitement occasionally." John L. Scott of the Los Angeles Times wrote that "it is colorful at times, rather tedious in other portions". Richard L. Coe of The Washington Post wrote, "Lesser Samuels' screen play meanders self-consciously and Victor Saville's direction is just as overblown. I found nothing remarkable in the performances of the leads, Paul Newman (not as good as he's been on TV), Pier Angeli, Virginia Mayo (more synthetically blondined than ever), Jack Palance (an overtheatric villain), or even Walter Hampden (the ancient Joseph)."

Harrison's Reports thought the film "deserves a high rating from the production point of view", but was "only moderately interesting" as entertainment. John McCarten of The New Yorker wrote that the film "has to do with the pursuit of the Grail by the most dismal assortment of characters I've encountered in a decade". The Monthly Film Bulletin wrote, "Any true religious atmosphere in this vulgar and incongruous fancy-dress parade is out of the question...Some may discover uproarious moments, many will be repelled by the tastelessness of the spectacle as a whole."

Writing in the first edition of his Film Guide in 1977, Leslie Halliwell described the film as "[p]o-faced biblical hokum...with howlingly bad casting and direction...[a] sea of boredom", assigning it 0 stars out of 4.

The elaborate musical score by Franz Waxman has been widely recognized. Elmer Bernstein recorded part of the suite in the 1970s.

== Legacy ==
Martin Scorsese wrote about the film as a guilty pleasure in 1978:

The Silver Chalice is one of the reasons I hired Boris Leven to design New York, New York. Giant and The Silver Chalice: any man who could design those two films...that's it, I had to have him. The Silver Chalice, which is a bad picture, has no authenticity. It's purely theatrical, and this is mainly due to the sets. They're clean and clear; it's almost like another life, another world. We don't know what ancient Rome was like, so why not take the attitude Fellini had with Satyricon: make it science fiction in reverse? The Silver Chalice came close to that, fifteen years earlier.

Paul Newman was apparently not proud of his performance. When the film was broadcast on television in 1966, he took out an advertisement in a Hollywood trade paper apologizing for his performance and requesting that people not watch the film. This backfired and the broadcast received unusually high ratings. The film is sometimes referred to as Paul Newman and the Holy Grail. Newman called the film "the worst motion picture produced during the 1950s", and once screened it for guests at his home, handing out pots, wooden spoons and whistles, encouraging the audience to offer noisy critiques.

== Home media ==
The film was released on DVD in 2009.
