= Man Wants to Live =

1961 film directed by Léonide Moguy

Man Wants to Live (fr: "Les hommes veulent vivre") is a 1961 French film co-written and directed by Léonide Moguy.

== Cast ==
- Yves Massard as Yves Chardin
- Jacqueline Huet as Mme Chardin
- John Justin as Carter
- Claudio Gora as Rossi
- Emilio Carrer
- Suzanne Courtal
- Louis Grizzi
- Lucien Hubert
- Valéry Inkijinoff
- Robert Le Béal
