= Teresa (1951 film) =

1951 American drama film

- Theatrical release poster
- Directed by: Fred Zinnemann
- Screenplay by: Stewart Stern
- Story by: Alfred Hayes; Stewart Stern
- Produced by: Arthur Loew Jr.
- Starring: Pier Angeli; John Ericson; Patricia Collinge; Peggy Ann Garner; Ralph Meeker; Bill Mauldin
- Cinematography: William Miller
- Edited by: Dave Kummins; Frank Sullivan
- Music by: Louis Applebaum
- Production company: Metro-Goldwyn-Mayer
- Distributed by: Loew's Inc.
- Release dates: April 5, 1951 (New York); August 15, 1951 (Los Angeles)
- Running time: 102 minutes
- Country: United States
- Language: English
- Budget: $610,000
- Box office: $1,783,000

Teresa (subtitled The Story of a Bride) is a 1951 American romantic war drama film directed by Fred Zinnemann for Metro-Goldwyn-Mayer. It stars Pier Angeli in her English-language debut and John Ericson in his film debut. Patricia Collinge, Peggy Ann Garner, Ralph Meeker and Rod Steiger (also in his debut) play supporting roles.

The film follows the relationship between a young American G.I. (Ericson) and his Italian wife (Angeli), who meet during the Italian campaign of World War II. Back in the United States, the couple's relationship is challenged by post-traumatic stress disorder and the pressures of domestic life.

== Plot ==
While fighting in Italy during World War II, American G.I. Philip Cass meets and falls in love with a woman named Teresa Russo. Cass, a sensitive young man, is bullied by his commanding officer but finds a kindred spirit in Teresa, who barters with the American servicemen for precious food supplies. After the war, Philip courts Teresa, and they are married in the ruins of her village's church.

Although Philip and Teresa love each other, their relationship is strained after the couple moves into the home of Philip's overbearing mother Clara in New York City. Philip suffers from severe post-traumatic stress disorder and is exasperated by the emotional manipulations of his mother, who fights Teresa for his attention. Philip is unable to hold a job, and when Teresa reveals that she is pregnant, he tells her to leave.

After speaking to his Veterans Affairs counselor, Philip finally gains the courage to confront his mother. He reconciles with Teresa shortly after the birth of their child, and they move into their own apartment.

== Cast ==
- Pier Angeli as Teresa Russo
- John Ericson as Philip Cass
- Patricia Collinge as Mrs. Clara Cass
- Richard Bishop as Mr. Cass
- Peggy Ann Garner as Susan Cass
- Ralph Meeker as Sgt. Dobbs
- Bill Mauldin as Grissom
- Ave Ninchi as Signora Russo
- Edward Binns as Sgt. Brown
- Rod Steiger as Frank
- Aldo Silvani as Professor Crocce
- Tommy Lewis as Walter
- Franco Interlenghi as Mario Russo
- Guido Martufi as Sergio Russo
- Lewis E. Ciannelli as Cheyenne
- Lee Marvin and Robert Wagner as G.I.s

== Production ==
The idea for the story began in 1947 when Loew's International head Arthur Loew Jr. showed director Fred Zinnemann an area of dilapidated army barracks on Long Island where many World War II veterans were living with their families. Loew felt that a worthwhile film could be produced that featured the struggles of veterans to adapt to civilian life. Alfred Hayes and Stewart Stern were hired to write the script, although Stern authored the final version. According to Zinneman's autobiography, the script was originally an adaptation of Hayes' novel The Girl on the Via Flaminia, but the screenplay differed so much from the original story that any association with the novel was dropped early in preproduction. Hayes retained a story credit in the film, and in 1953 the novel was adapted into the United Artists film Act of Love.

Zinnemann attempted to interest Marlon Brando, star of his 1950 film The Men, to play the male lead role. Montgomery Clift, star of Zinnemann's 1948 film The Search, was also considered and helped by directing screen tests of actresses in Italy. In March 1950, newcomer Robert Wagner was rumored as the top choice for the role. Loew, Stern and Zinnemann became desperate, placing a newspaper advertisement and renting a New York theater for an audition that drew more than 300 actors, from which John Ericson was selected in April.

Stern discovered Pier Angeli while in Italy to scout locations and actors in advance of production. Lamberto Maggiorani, star of the 1948 Italian film Bicycle Thieves, was sought for the role of Teresa's brother but did not sign.

Location filming in Italy began in April 1950 and lasted for three months. Battle scenes were filmed in authentic locations where the Allies had fought the Gothic Line at Livergnano. The town of Scascoli was selected for village scenes, but as it had been rebuilt since the war, its streets and buildings were prepared to resemble those of a battle-ravaged town. The church in Livergnano at which the main characters are married had also been rebuilt, but the producers obtained permission from the bishop of Bologna to temporarily alter its appearance. The film's budget was $550,000, of which $140,000 was spent in Italy.

The New York scenes were filmed on location in Manhattan, including Central Park, the actual maternity ward of Bellevue Hospital and a local studio.

Teresa was director Zinnemann's second film dealing with the topics of post-traumatic stress disorder and veteran rehabilitation, preceded by The Men in 1950. His direction was influenced by Italian neorealism, including the usage of unknown actors and location filming.

== Reception ==
In a contemporary review for The New York Times, critic Bosley Crowther called the film a "highly commendable little picture" and wrote: "It merits the rare appreciation of all who are interested in honest, mature films. For what has been done in this picture is something fresh and intelligent, indeed, in the light of the usual run of pictures on ambitious psychological themes. ... From a script of simple construction but authentic situations and dialogue, which Stewart Stern has written, Mr. Zinnemann has evolved a film that places these two real young people in a world that is equally real."

Critic John L. Scott of the Los Angeles Times wrote: "'Teresa' is an honest attempt to depict drama resulting from the marriage of a sensitive American boy who has no stomach for war to an Italian girl who looks like a child. It has good dramatic values but an overabundance of plot, or rather subplots which at times confused the main issue. ... [T]he picture is low-keyed throughout, including photography and acting. It appears an attempt, partly successful, has been made to inject a documentary style into the film."

According to MGM records, the film earned $743,000 in the United States and Canada and $1,004,000 elsewhere, recording a profit of $421,000.

== Awards ==
| Ceremony | Category | Nominee | Result |
|---|---|---|---|
| 12th Venice International Film Festival | Golden Lion | Fred Zinnemann | Nominated |
| 24th Academy Awards | Best Story | Alfred Hayes, Stewart Stern | Nominated |
| 9th Golden Globe Awards | New Star of the Year—Actress | Pier Angeli | Won |
