= Tomorrow Is Too Late =

1950 film

- Spanish film poster
- Directed by: Léonide Moguy
- Written by: Giuseppe Berto; Oreste Biancoli; Alfred Machard
- Music by: Alessandro Cicognini
- Distributed by: Chamartin (Italy); Joseph Burstyn (US)
- Release date: 21 September 1950 (Italy)
- Running time: 101 minutes
- Country: Italy
- Language: Italian

Domani è troppo tardi (internationally released as Tomorrow Is Too Late) is a 1950 Italian melodrama film directed by Léonide Moguy.

For this film Pier Angeli won the Silver Ribbon for best actress. The film was also awarded Best Italian Film at the Venice Film Festival.

== Cast ==
- Pier Angeli: Mirella (as Anna Maria Pierangeli)
- Vittorio De Sica: Professor Landi
- Lois Maxwell: Signorina Anna, insegnante
- Gino Leurini: Franco
- Gabrielle Dorziat: preside
- Armando Migliari: preside
- Lauro Gazzolo: Signor Giusti
- Carlo Romano: Signor Barrardi
- Olga Solbelli: Signora Giusti
- Ave Ninchi: Signora Berardi
- Monique van Vooren: Giannina
- Carlo Delle Piane: Enzo
- Luciano De Ambrosis
- Lina Marengo: Serafina
