= Giorgio Prosperi =

Italian screenwriter

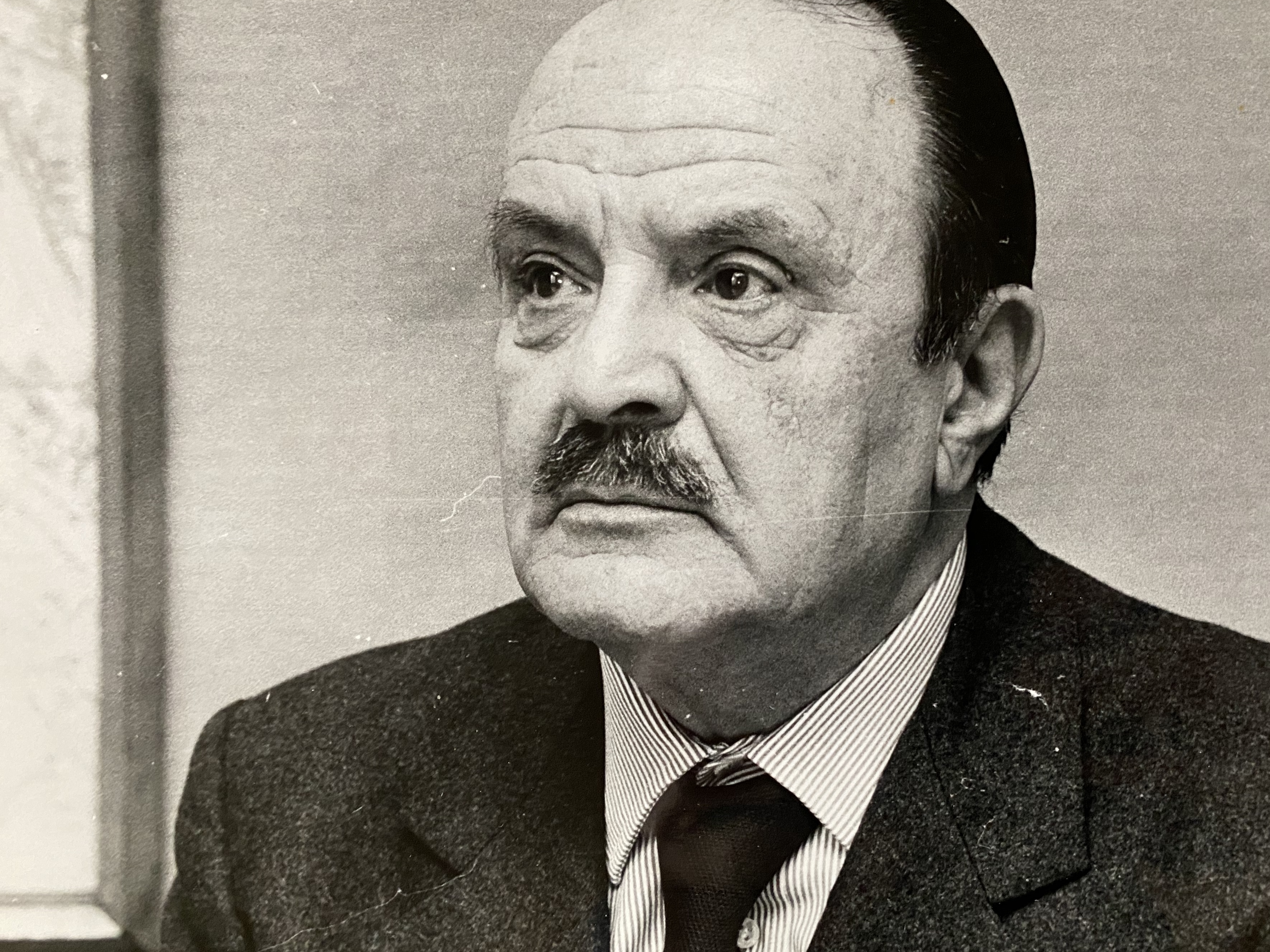
- Born: 17 February 1911; Rome, Italy
- Died: 21 January 1997 (aged 85); Rome, Italy
- Occupation: Screenwriter
- Years active: 1948-1967

Giorgio Prosperi (17 February 1911 – 21 January 1997) was an Italian screenwriter. He wrote for 46 films between 1948 and 1967.

== Selected filmography ==
- The Golden Arrow (1962)
- The Angel Wore Red (1960)
- Everyone's in Love (1959)
- Violent Summer (1959)
- Arrivederci Roma (1957)
- Senso (1954)
- Maddalena (1954)
- I Chose Love (1953)
- The Angel of Sin (1952)
- The Overcoat (1952)
- Tomorrow Is Another Day (1951)
- Without a Flag (1951)
- The Lovers of Ravello (1951)
