= The Devil Makes Three (film) =

1952 film by Andrew Marton

- Directed by: Andrew Marton
- Written by: Lawrence P. Bachmann; Jerry Davis
- Produced by: Richard Goldstone
- Starring: Gene Kelly; Pier Angeli; Richard Egan
- Cinematography: Václav Vích
- Edited by: Ben Lewis
- Music by: Rudolph G. Kopp
- Production company: Metro-Goldwyn-Mayer
- Distributed by: Loew's Inc.
- Release date: August 29, 1952 (New York)
- Running time: 96 minutes
- Country: United States
- Language: English
- Budget: $1,005,000
- Box office: $1,485,000

The Devil Makes Three is a 1952 American thriller film noir directed by Andrew Marton and starring Gene Kelly, Pier Angeli and Richard Egan.

== Plot ==
Former Eighth Air Force bomber crewman Captain Jeff Eliot returns to Germany in 1947 to visit the family who rescued and hid him from the Nazis after his plane was downed over Munich in World War II. He learns that most of the family was killed by an American air raid. The only survivor is the daughter, Wilhelmina "Willie" Lehrt, who is working as a hostess in a nightclub and hates Americans. However, Eliot romances Willie and in his time at the nightclub, he develops a friendship with a comic named Heisemann.

Heisemann has secret ties to an underground Nazi revivalist movement. When Eliot discovers the truth, he informs his superiors, who order him to continue his relationship with Willie to learn more about Heisemann's operation.

== Cast ==
- Gene Kelly as Captain Jeff Eliot
- Pier Angeli as Wilhelmina "Willie" Lehrt
- Richard Rober as Colonel James Terry
- Richard Egan as Captain Parker
- Claus Clausen as Heisemann
- Wilfried Seyferth as Hansig
- Margot Hielscher as Bar Singer
- Annie Rosar as Mrs. Keigler
- Harold Benedict as Sgt. at Airport
- Otto Gebühr as Mr. Nolder
- Gertrud Wolle as Mrs. Nolder
- Heinrich Gretler as Keigler
- Charlotte Flemming as Girl in Telephone Booth
- Charles Gordon Howard as Lt. Farris
- Bum Krüger as Oberlitz
- Claus Lombard as Waiter
- Iván Petrovich as Sigmund Neffs
- Sepp Rist as Customs Official - German
- Michael Tellering as Ernst Haltmann
- Ruth Megary as Waitress

== Production ==
The film's climax takes place in Berchtesgaden, and the scenes in which Heisemann is chased through the rubble were filmed inside the ruins of Hitler's house just before its final demolition by the German government. In the scene's final frame, Heisemann stands facing his captors in the notorious huge picture window of the house.

== Reception ==
In a contemporary review for The New York Times, critic Howard Thompson called the film "a synthetic, pallid and erratic endeavor" and wrote: "Jerry Davis' script is a predictable and rather sluggish account of a tender post-war romance ... which sags tediously in a welter of starry-eyed conversation and adds up to little more than a Continental Western."

According to MGM records, the film earned $743,000 in the U.S. and Canada and $742,000 elsewhere, resulting in a loss of $57,000.
