= Two Women (1940 film) =

1940 film

- German poster
- Directed by: Léonide Moguy
- Screenplay by: Louis d'Hee; Charles Spaak
- Based on: Sein Vermächtnis by Maxence Van der Meersch
- Produced by: Emmanuel Zama
- Starring: Pierre Blanchar; Annie Ducaux; Blanchette Brunoy
- Cinematography: Otto Heller
- Edited by: Jean Sacha
- Music by: Jane Bos
- Production company: Zama film
- Distributed by: Lux Compagnie Cinématographique de France
- Release date: 1 November 1940
- Running time: 97 minutes
- Country: France
- Language: French

Two Women (French: L'empreinte du Dieu) is a 1940 French drama film directed by Léonide Moguy and starring Pierre Blanchar, Annie Ducaux and Blanchette Brunoy. It is based on the novel Sein Vermächtnis by Maxence Van der Meersch. The film's sets were designed by the art director Robert Gys. Delays due to the outbreak of the Second World War led to the replacement of the original leads Dita Parlo and Mila Parély. It was one of the last French films completed before the German occupation. The New York Times called it a "flimsy and dismal affair".

== Synopsis ==
In prewar Bruges the timid Karelina flees her brutal smuggler husband Gomar to seek sanctuary in the home of her sister, Wilfrida. While there, Karelina enters into a tragic romance with her brother-in-law. The situation reaches a violent climax when a vengeful Gomar is released from prison, determined to reclaim his wife.

== Cast ==
- Pierre Blanchar as Domitien Van Bergen
- Annie Ducaux as Wilfrida Van Bergen
- Blanchette Brunoy as Karelina
- Jacques Dumesnil as Gomar
- Ginette Leclerc as Fanny
- Pierre Larquey as Mosselmanns
- Héléna Manson as La soeur de Karelina

== Bibliography ==
- Goble, Alan. The Complete Index to Literary Sources in Film. Walter de Gruyter, 1999.
