= The Light Touch =

1951 film by Richard Brooks

- Directed by: Richard Brooks
- Screenplay by: Richard Brooks
- Story by: Jed Harris; Tom Reed
- Produced by: Pandro S. Berman
- Starring: Stewart Granger; Pier Angeli; George Sanders
- Cinematography: Robert Surtees
- Edited by: George Boemler
- Music by: Miklós Rózsa
- Production company: Metro-Goldwyn-Mayer
- Distributed by: Metro-Goldwyn-Mayer
- Release dates: November 29, 1951 (U.S.); January 16, 1952 (New York)
- Running time: 93 minutes
- Country: United States
- Language: English
- Budget: $1,163,000
- Box office: $1,281,000

The Light Touch is a 1951 American crime drama film directed by Richard Brooks and starring Stewart Granger, Pier Angeli and George Sanders. It was produced and released by Metro-Goldwyn-Mayer.

== Plot ==
Art thief Sam Conride steals a Renaissance-era painting on loan to an Italian museum by a Catholic church. He has been financed by his partner, Felix Guignol, whose obsessed client Aramescue has agreed to pay $100,000 for the artwork. Conride stages a boating accident on the way to the rendezvous in Tunis and informs Felix that the painting has been destroyed in a fire.

Felix doubts Sam's story but accepts his suggestion that they create several forgeries to sell to unsuspecting art lovers. Felix recommends Anna Vasarri as a painter sufficiently talented and in need of money who can perform the work. However, she is appalled and refuses, especially because the painting is believed by Catholics (and Aramescue) to work miracles. Felix instructs Sam to convince her to change her mind by romancing her. The ploy works and she falls in love with Sam.

Sam contacts R. F. Hawkley, one of the few art fences capable of selling the famous painting. After his forgery expert MacWade confirms that the work is genuine, he agrees to pay $100,000. However, he does not have the money with him, and Felix learns of their meeting.

Sam and Anna are married and travel to Italy for their honeymoon, financed by Felix. While there, Anna accidentally learns where Sam has hidden the real painting. Felix and his men watch and await Sam to meet Hawkley. Felix's thug Charles tries to extract the information from Anna by employing physical violence, but she refuses to betray Sam.

Police officer Lt. Massiro informs Anna that if she knows the location of the real painting, it must be returned or else he will arrest Sam. Anna asks for time to consider her options. She switches the painting with the fake, and when Sam shows it to Aramescu, he immediately identifies it as a copy. Sam discovers that Anna remained true to him despite being beaten and realizes that she truly loves him, despite his many flaws, and that he loves her. She reveals the location of the painting and leaves him.

Sam arranges for Massiro to arrest Felix and his men, but they are released when it is revealed that the painting is a forgery. However, this provides Sam with the time to return the work to its rightful place in the church. Anna returns to him as a result, and as they walk away together, Felix stops Charles from shooting Sam.

== Cast ==
- Stewart Granger as Sam Conride
- Pier Angeli as Anna Vasarri
- George Sanders as Felix Guignol
- Kurt Kasznar as Mr. Aramescu
- Joseph Calleia as Lt. Massiro
- Larry Keating as Mr. R. F. Hawkley
- Rhys Williams as Mr. MacWade
- Norman Lloyd as Anton
- Mike Mazurki as Charles
- Ben Astar as Hamadi Mahmoud
- Hans Conried as Leopold
- Renzo Cesana as Father Dolzi
- Vito Scotti as Hotel Clerk
- Mario Siletti as Hotel Manager

== Production ==
The original story written by Broadway producer Jed Harris and Tom Reed, titled "Crown of Thorns", was purchased by MGM in April 1950 for $60,000, with Pandro S. Berman assigned as producer.

The script was written by Richard Brooks, who also directed the film. Cary Grant was originally announced for role of Sam Conride, but the lead roles were ultimately assigned to Stewart Granger and Pier Angeli, who had both just signed long-term contracts with MGM. Following Granger's location work in Idaho for Constable Pedley (later retitled The Wild North), he appeared in The Light Touch, after which he returned to the production of Constable Pedley for interior filming. George Sanders appears in the first of his three-film deal with MGM.

Granger wrote in his memoirs that was forced to appear in the film to avoid studio suspension and that he had entered the project apprehensive about Brooks' reputation for belittling his actors.

Filming began in April 1951 on location in Taormina, Sicily and Tunis before returning to the MGM studios for two weeks, ending in early June. Writer Truman Capote was living in Taormina at the time of filming and persuaded Brooks to place him in a street scene. However, while screening the rough cut, Berman demanded the excision of frames showing Capote's face.

== Reception ==
In a contemporary review for The New York Times, critic A. H. Weiler called wrote: "Since they had the good taste to adhere to their title, Richard Brooks, who wrote and directed 'The Light Touch,' and his cast are doing a service to the viewer. For the melodrama ... blithely relates the story of a seemingly unregenerate art thief who mends his ways because of his artist-wife's unselfish love, without resorting to too many clichés. And, since it was filmed abroad, the principals have little trouble in maintaining the picture's exotic flavor. ... 'The Light Touch,' in short, may not be art but it is entertaining."

According to MGM records, the movie earned $438,000 in the U.S. and Canada and $843,000 internationally, leading to a loss of $406,000. It recorded admissions of 10,277 in France.
