= François Guérin =

French actor (1927–2003)

- Born: 12 December 1927; Paris; France
- Died: 26 October 2003 (aged 75); Paris; France
- Occupation(s): Film actor Television actor
- Years active: 1952 - 1989

François Guérin (French pronunciation: [fʁɑ̃swa ɡeʁɛ̃]; 1927–2003) was a French film and television actor.

== Filmography ==
Year	Title	Role	Notes
1952	Twelve Hours of Happiness	Gilbert Lantois	
1953	La Vie d'un honnête homme	Pierre Lacoste	
1954	Mam'zelle Nitouche	La Vauzelle	
1955	The Aristocrats	Pierre de Maubrun	
1956	Maid in Paris	Jean-Pierre	
1956	If Paris Were Told to Us	Le Premier Visiteur	
1956	Diary of a Bad Girl	Le docteur André Monod	
1956	Mitsou	Robert - le lieutenant bleu	
1957	The Wheel	Jacques Marchand	
1957	Give Me My Chance	Georges Martin	
1958	Sinners of Paris	L'inspecteur Gilbert Barot, de la P.J.	
1959	Ramuntcho	Ramuntcho	
1960	The Cat Shows Her Claws	Louis	
1960	Eyes Without a Face	Le docteur Jacques Vernon	
1961	Par-dessus le mur	Jean	
1964	Weekend at Dunkirk	Le lieutenant pressé	
1968	Darling Caroline	Gaston de Salanches	
1971	Good Little Girls	Dr. Luçon	
