= The Story of Three Loves =

1953 film

- Theatrical release poster
- Directed by: Vincente Minnelli; Gottfried Reinhardt
- Written by: John Collier; George Froeschel; Jan Lustig; Jacques Maret; Arnold Lippschitz; Ladislao Vajda
- Produced by: Sidney Franklin
- Starring: Pier Angeli; Ethel Barrymore; Leslie Caron; Kirk Douglas; Farley Granger; James Mason; Agnes Moorehead; Moira Shearer
- Cinematography: Charles Rosher; Harold Rosson
- Edited by: Ralph E. Winters
- Music by: Miklós Rózsa
- Color process: Technicolor
- Distributed by: Metro-Goldwyn-Mayer
- Release date: March 26, 1953
- Running time: 122 minutes
- Country: United States
- Language: English
- Budget: $2,498,000
- Box office: $3,167,000

The Story of Three Loves (also known as Equilibrium) is a 1953 American Technicolor romantic anthology film made by MGM. It consists of three stories, "The Jealous Lover", "Mademoiselle", and "Equilibrium". The film was produced by Sidney Franklin. "Mademoiselle" was directed by Vincente Minnelli, while Gottfried Reinhardt directed the other two segments. The screenplays were written by John Collier ("The Jealous Lover", "Equilibrium"), Jan Lustig ("Equilibrium", "Mademoiselle"), and George Froeschel ("Equilibrium", "Mademoiselle").

"The Jealous Lover" stars Moira Shearer and James Mason; "Mademoiselle" features Leslie Caron, Farley Granger, Ethel Barrymore, and Ricky Nelson; Pier Angeli and Kirk Douglas headline "Equilibrium".

The music score is by Miklós Rózsa. The soundtrack features extended excerpts from Sergei Rachmaninoff's Rhapsody on a Theme of Paganini, performed by the pianist Jakob Gimpel for "The Jealous Lover".

Choreography for "The Jealous Lover" was by Frederick Ashton.

== Plot ==
=== The Jealous Lover ===
On an ocean liner, a passenger recognizes famed ballet creator Charles Coudray, and asks him politely why one of his works was never performed after its debut. When Coudray remains silent, the fan leaves him alone with his thoughts, leading to a flashback.

Ballerina Paula Woodward auditions for Coudray. Coudray is impressed, but then Paula collapses and has to be carried off stage. A doctor informs her aunt Lydia, who in her day had been a highly acclaimed ballerina, that Paula has a heart condition that will force her to give up dancing, if she dances again, she could die. Lydia is deeply saddened, and tells the doctor that Paula would have been an even greater ballerina than she. Paula overhears Lydia wondering aloud how she could tell Paula the terrible news.

Some time later, Paula attends a performance of Coudray's latest ballet. After it seems that everyone else has left, she goes on stage and dances. However, she is not alone, Coudray has been watching. He had been dissatisfied with certain aspects of his work; from what he has seen of Paula's impromptu performance, he believes she can help him fix the defects.

At first, Paula declines his invitation to dance for him at his home studio, but eventually she dons a costume from his ballet and she dances. Paula lives up to Coudray's high expectations, but she exhausts herself in the process. Coudray tenderly kisses her and tells her that they will be together forever. She excuses herself to change, and slips away to return home to Aunt Lydia brimming with the news of what had transpired. But on her way upstairs, she dies, her last words recounting her promise to Coudray that she would be with him always.

=== Mademoiselle ===
The story then shifts to a second passenger, referred to only as Mademoiselle. A chance remark by a passerby about a governess triggers her flashback.

She is the governess and French tutor to Thomas Clayton Campbell Jr., a bored eleven-year-old American boy left in her charge at a hotel in Rome by his absent parents. One day, another boy dares him to visit Mrs. Hazel Pennicott, who lives next door and is reputed to be a witch. When he wishes he were a man, she tells him to wrap a ribbon she has around his finger and recite her name at 8 pm, but she warns him that the spell will only last until midnight. She cuts the ribbon in half (in case she wants to have it for someone else's spell) and gives it to him. After arguing with Mademoiselle to stop her from over-mothering him and staying in on her last night in Rome, he gets in bed and evokes the spell. The incantation works, and he is transformed into a young man.

In his new form, he goes to find Mademoiselle, and is surprised to find that he no longer despises Mademoiselle, nor the romantic poetry that she kept reciting to him. They embark on a whirlwind romance, but he warns her that he has only a few hours before he has to go away. He does however promise that he will see her off at the train station the next day. He flees as the clock strikes midnight.

He keeps his word, but as the young boy. Mademoiselle quits her job to remain in Rome. While waiting for her lover to show up, she bumps into Mrs. Pennicott and spills the contents of the old woman's purse. Mademoiselle gathers up the various items, but after Mrs. Pennicott thanks her and leaves, she picks up an overlooked red ribbon.

The film shifts back to the ship. While Mademoiselle is knitting in a deck chair, the red ribbon blows away. When she goes to retrieve it, she encounters a handsome young man who informs her that he saw her before, from the train as it departed the station.

=== Equilibrium ===
The camera moves to Pierre Narval, leaning over the rail and gazing at the ocean.

In Paris, Narval saves a suicidal Nina Burkhardt after she jumps from a bridge over the Seine River. He goes to visit her in the hospital, and finds her still very depressed. He gives her his address and asks her to come see him.

When she does (having nowhere else to go), he tells her that he was once a great trapeze artist. However being the best was not enough for him; he kept trying more and more dangerous tricks, and two years before, his partner was killed as a result. After that, nobody would work with him. As Nina has demonstrated that she has no fear of dying, he asks her to be his new partner. When she agrees, he starts training her, despite his friends' warning that his obsession will kill her too.

Narval learns Nina's own dark secret. She and her husband had been imprisoned by the Nazis in a concentration camp during World War II. She was released. Sensing that he was planning an escape, she had written him a letter begging him to wait, that the Allies would liberate him soon enough. However, she entrusted the letter to a man who betrayed them. Her husband was executed.

At last, the act is ready. They audition for an important American, who insists they perform the climax, the "Leap of Death" (a blind jump by Nina through a screen to Narval on the trapeze), without a safety net, just as they would before a live audience. They do the trick, but then Narval makes a decision. They walk away, leaving the circus behind them. Back aboard the ship, Narval is joined by a loving Nina.

== Cast ==
- Pier Angeli as Nina Burkhardt
- Ethel Barrymore as Mrs. Hazel Pennicott
- Leslie Caron as Mademoiselle
- Kirk Douglas as Pierre Narval
- Farley Granger as Thomas Clayton Campbell Jr.
- James Mason as Charles Coudray
- Moira Shearer as Paula Woodward
- Agnes Moorehead as Aunt Lydia
- Zsa Zsa Gabor as Flirt at Bar (segment "Mademoiselle")
- Richard Anderson as Marcel (segment "Equilibrium")
- Ricky Nelson as Thomas age 11

== Reception ==
According to MGM records, the film made $1,096,000 in the U.S. and Canada and $2,071,000 in other markets, resulting in a loss of $805,000.

== Awards ==
The film was nominated an Academy Award for Best Art Direction (Cedric Gibbons, E. Preston Ames, Edward Carfagno, Gabriel Scognamillo, Edwin B. Willis, F. Keogh Gleason, Arthur Krams, Jack D. Moore).
