= Léonide Moguy =

French film director, screenwriter and film editor (1899–1976)

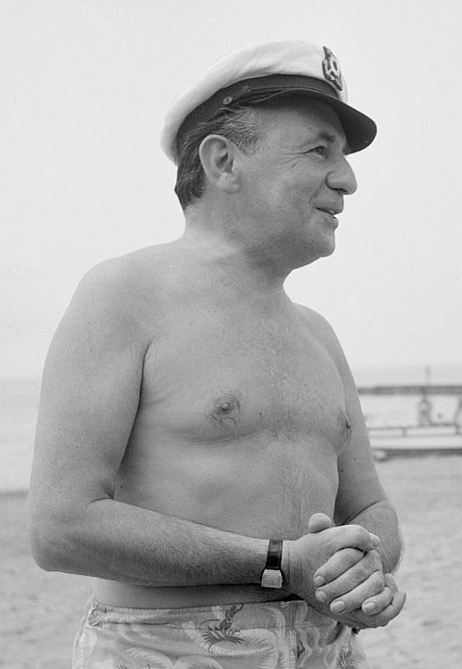
- Moguy in 1955
- Born: 14 July 1899; Odessa, Russian Empire
- Died: 21 April 1976 (aged 76); Paris, France
- Partner: Jacques Fath

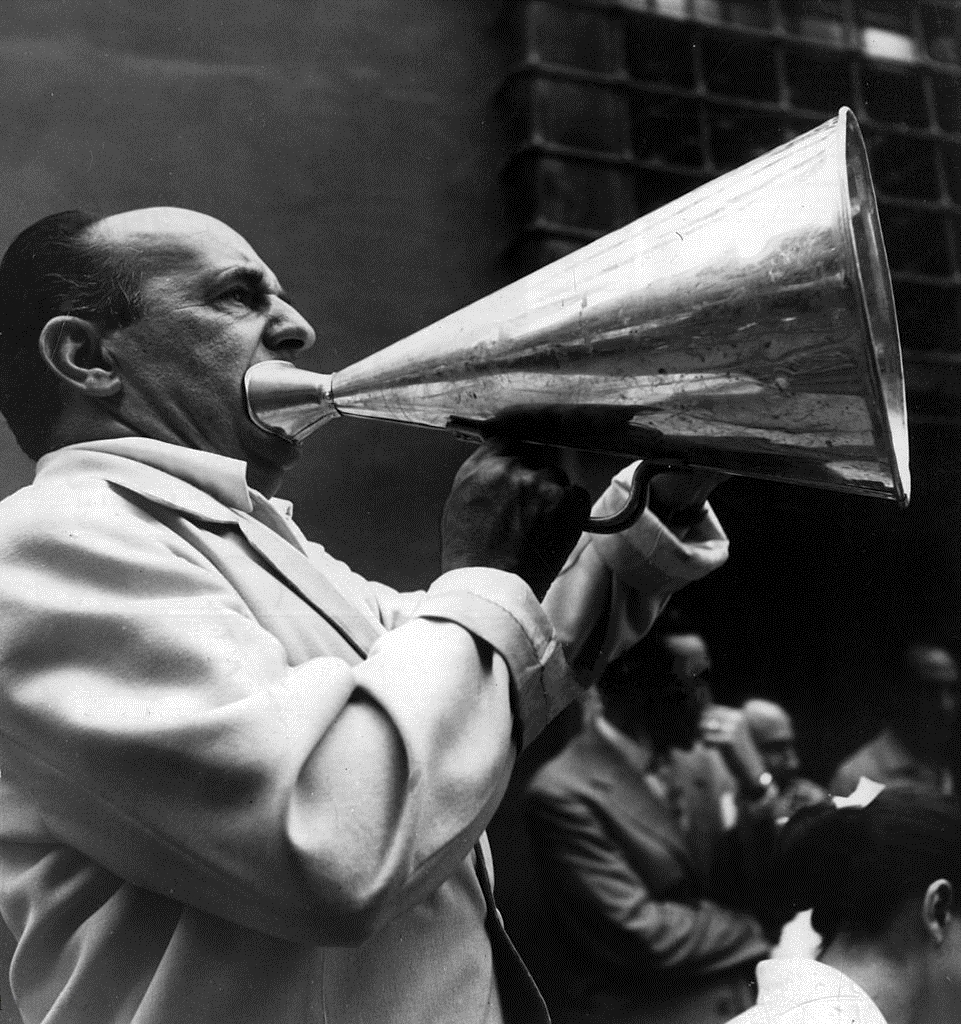
Moguy on set of Tomorrow Is Another Day in 1950

Léonide Moguy (14 July 1899 – 21 April 1976) was a Ukrainian, French and Italian film director, screenwriter and film editor.

Moguy was born Leonid Mohylevskyi (Леонід Могилевський) in Odesa, Russian Empire in 1899 to a Jewish family. He lived in Soviet Ukraine until 1929, in the United States in the 1940s, and in Italy from 1949 until his death. He was active in film between 1927 and 1961. His work has influenced American director Quentin Tarantino, who discovered him while writing the script for Inglourious Basterds, and named a character after him in Django Unchained.

== Career ==
Mohylevskyi was born in Odesa in a family of a merchandise worker. During World War I, he was a soldier of the 51st Lithuanian Infantry Regiment of the Imperial Russian Army in Simferopol. After the war, he was a medical student and worked part-time at the film studio of Dmytro Kharytonov who came from Moscow to Odesa.

Mohylevskyi did not become a doctor, however, graduating from Odesa Institute of National Economy in 1924, he became a lawyer. Soon, he was invited to work as a VUFKU legal advisor at Odesa Film Studio. Mohylevskyi showed interest not only in the letter of the law, but also in laws and principles of film editing as he assisted the director Mykola Saltykov.

In 1927, Mohylevskyi was the head of the Newsreel Department VUFKU, was a colleague of Dziga Vertov and Mikhail Kaufman. Together with Oleksandr Dovzhenko he initiated the creation of the first library of Ukrainian films. The department headed by Mohylevskyi began to issue Kinotyzhden, and later, Kinozhurnal VUFKU, a collection of fresh newsreels, "timely and urgent," that became nearly the only source of news at that time.

Then, Mohylevskyi made two mashup films, How It Was (1927) and Documents of the Era (1928), in collaboration with the director Ya. Habovych. The latter was the most popular VUFKU mashup film based on 150,000 meters of newsreels dating back to 1917–1922.

Leonid Mohylevskyi used archive materials ("some positive fragments" and pre-revolutionary "rubbish") stored in VUFKU archives or bought from other film studios or private persons as the basis for his film.

An active member of the society Friends of Soviet Cinema, Mohylevskyi edited 16 short films for them, such as Now! and Peak ticket (Піковий квиток) filmed by amateur Experimental Film Studio headed by Hlib Zatvornytskyi.

=== France ===
He moved to France and developed a reputation as a "play doctor" of films. He started directing and had a hit with 40 Little Mothers.

=== Hollywood ===
Moguy moved to Hollywood in 1940. He made the film The Night is Ending (1943) at 20th Century Fox. He stayed at Fox to make Paris After Dark then went to RKO to make Action in Arabia.

He was meant to follow Action in Arabia with Experiment Perilous with Paul Henreid at RKO but the film was not made. Instead he made Whistle Stop for United Artists.

"I didn't do the pictures I wanted to", he later said of this time.

=== Europe ===
Moguy returned to France where he made Bethsabee (1947). In 1947 he announced he would direct the first Belgian-Hollywood co production, New York's Origin, a story of the Belgian refugees who established New York. The film was not made.

Instead he made Tomorrow Is Too Late (1950) which introduced Pier Angeli. They were reunited in Tomorrow Is Another Day (1951).

He went on to make 100 Little Mothers (1952), Children of Love (1953), The Width of the Pavement (1956), Give Me My Chance (1957) and Man Wants To Live (1961).

== Personal life ==
One of Moguy's early companions was the fashion designer Jacques Fath, a sometime actor who appeared in an early Moguy film. Later in life, Moguy befriended German actress Ellen Farner; in her brief contribution to his biography's preface, Farner describes Moguy as "l'ami sublime," citing his humanity, charisma and intelligence, as well as his benevolent gaze.

== Selected filmography ==
- Documents of the Era (1928) – director, editor
- The Wonderful Day (1932) – editor
- Theodore and Company (1933) – editor
- Charlemagne (1933) – editor
- The Scandal (1934) – film
- Skylark (1934) – editor
- Count Obligado (1935) – editor
- Divine (1935) – editor
- The Squadron's Baby (1935) – editor
- Baccara (1935) – editor, uncredited director, first assistant director
- Forty Little Mothers (1936) – director, writer
- Prison sans barreaux (1938) – director, writer
- Conflict (1938) – director, writer
- Je t'attendrai (1939) – director
- Two Women (1940) – director
- Paris After Dark (1943) – director
- Action in Arabia (1944) – director
- Whistle Stop (1946) with George Raft and Ava Gardner – director
- Bethsabee (1947) – director
- Tomorrow Is Too Late (1950) – director, writer, producer
- Tomorrow Is Another Day (1951) – director, writer
- One Hundred Little Mothers (1952) – writer, producer
- Children of Love (1953) – director, writer
- The Width of the Pavement (1956) – director, writer
- Give Me My Chance (1957) – director, writer
- Man Wants To Live (1961) – director, writer
