= Pier Angeli =

Italian actress and model (1932–1971)

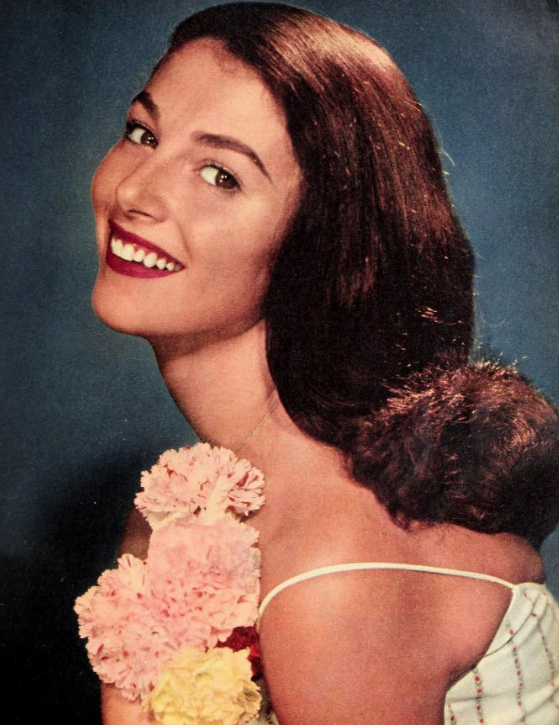
- Pier Angeli featured in the American fan magazine Modern Screen, 1957
- Born: Anna Maria Pierangeli; 19 June 1932; Cagliari, Sardinia, Kingdom of Italy
- Died: 10 September 1971 (aged 39); Beverly Hills, California, U.S.
- Resting place: Cimetière des Bulvis, Rueil-Malmaison, France
- Other name: Annamaria Pierangeli
- Occupations: Actress; model; singer
- Years active: 1950–1971
- Spouses: Vic Damone (m. 1954; div. 1958) Armando Trovajoli (m. 1962; div. 1969)
- Children: 2
- Relatives: Marisa Pavan (sister)

Anna Maria Pierangeli (19 June 1932 – 10 September 1971), known internationally by the stage name Pier Angeli, was an Italian actress, model, and singer. She won the Italian Silver Ribbon for Best Actress for her debut role in the 1950 film Tomorrow Is Too Late, and subsequently won a Golden Globe Award for New Star of the Year – Actress for her performance in the American film Teresa (1951).

In the United States, Angeli was typecast in "European ingénue" roles, and played romantic leading ladies in The Light Touch (1951), The Devil Makes Three (1952), The Story of Three Loves (1953), The Silver Chalice (1954), and Somebody Up There Likes Me (1956). She was nominated for a BAFTA Award for Best Foreign Actress for her role opposite Richard Attenborough in the British film The Angry Silence (1960).

Off-screen, Angeli was known for high-profile romantic affairs with actors Kirk Douglas and James Dean, and later her tumultuous marriage to singer Vic Damone. She died at the age of 39 of a barbiturate overdose. Her twin sister, Marisa Pavan, was also an actress.

== Early life ==
Angeli was born in Cagliari, Sardinia, to Enrichetta (née Romiti) and Luigi Pierangeli, originally from Pesaro, Marche. She had a fraternal twin sister, actress Marisa Pavan, and a younger sister, Patrizia.

Angeli spent World War II in Rome; she was ten when the Nazis occupied Rome, experiencing both food shortages and bomb shelters. She was deeply affected by her experiences during the war, recalling later: "What was in the world, I didn't want to know."

== Career ==
Angeli made her film debut at the age of 16 with Vittorio De Sica's Italian film, Domani è troppo tardi (1950) after being spotted by director Léonide Moguy and De Sica while studying arts in Rome. Her work was so impressive that she won the Nastro d'Argento for Best Actress (Italian: silver ribbon), and caught the eye of MGM producers, who offered her a contract with the studio.

MGM launched her in Teresa (1951), her first American film, which also saw the film debuts of Rod Steiger and John Ericson. Reviews for this performance compared her to Greta Garbo, and she won the New Star of the Year–Actress Golden Globe. Under contract to MGM throughout the 1950s, she appeared in a series of films, including The Light Touch with Stewart Granger and The Devil Makes Three with Gene Kelly. Plans for a film of Romeo and Juliet with her and Marlon Brando fell through when a British-Italian production was announced.

While filming The Story of Three Loves (1953), Angeli began a relationship with costar Kirk Douglas. She next appeared in Sombrero, in which she replaced an indisposed Ava Gardner, then Flame and the Flesh (1954). After discovering Leslie Caron, another European ingénue, MGM lent Angeli to other studios. She went to Warner Bros. for both The Silver Chalice (1954), which marked the debut of Paul Newman, and the French-language musical Oh No, Mam'zelle (Mam'zelle Nitouche), also 1954), co-starring alongside Fernandel. For Paramount, she was in contention for the role of Anna Magnani's daughter in The Rose Tattoo (1955), but the role went to Marisa Pavan, her twin sister. MGM lent her to Columbia for Port Afrique (1956), where she got to showcase her real singing voice. She returned to MGM for Somebody Up There Likes Me (1956) as Paul Newman's long-suffering wife (Angeli's former lover, James Dean, was to play the starring role, which went to Newman after Dean's death). Newman would later say of her: "The most beautiful Italian actress of the century. She was an extremely complex and gifted woman. It was so unfortunate that the roles she was asked to play rarely demanded what I know she had to offer." She then appeared in The Vintage (1957) and finished her MGM contract in Merry Andrew (1958) starring with Danny Kaye. She was considered to play Rima in Green Mansions (1959), a character she had long wanted to play. Instead she played the part for the July 1954 issue of Life Magazine, shot by Allan Grant. In 1959, she released an album called Italia con Pier Angeli in which she sings in English and Italian. One reviewer called her singing voice "warm and surprisingly rich." She also continued to be hired for modelling jobs well into the 1960s.

During the 1960s and until 1970, Angeli lived and worked in Britain and Europe, and was often screen-credited under her birth name, 'Anna Maria Pierangeli.' She starred in French, Italian and English-language movies throughout the 1960s. For her performance in The Angry Silence (1960), in which she starred alongside her friend Richard Attenborough, Angeli was nominated for a Best Foreign Actress BAFTA. She was reunited with Stewart Granger for Sodom and Gomorrah (1963), in which she played Lot's wife, and had a brief role in the war epic Battle of the Bulge (1965). Angeli was top-billed in Every Bastard a King (1968), which concerned events during the Arab-Israeli Six-Day War of the previous year. She was under serious consideration for a part in The Godfather (1972), but died before shooting began.

== Personal life and death ==
Angeli was fluent in Italian and English, and nearly fluent in French. She was good friends with Debbie Reynolds, Louis Jourdan, and Richard Attenborough. Because she travelled so much, she encountered many artists throughout her life. For example, in 1960, Angeli met Serge Gainsbourg in a nightclub. On a piece of paper, she scribbled in French: "J’adore 'L’eau à la bouche', ça me donne l’eau à la bouche," and slipped it into one of Gainsbourg's pockets. He treasured this relic, and her gesture had the effect of motivating him to persevere in romantic songwriting.

According to Kirk Douglas' autobiography The Ragman's Son, he and Angeli were engaged in the 1950s after meeting on the set of the film The Story of Three Loves (1953).

=== Affair with James Dean ===
Angeli also had a passionate romantic relationship with James Dean. They met while she was shooting The Silver Chalice (1954) and he was shooting East of Eden (1955), on an adjoining Warner lot; Elia Kazan, the director of East of Eden, remembered hearing Dean and Angeli loudly having sex in Dean's dressing room. Much against her will, she was forced to break the relationship off as her mother was not happy with it, both because Dean was not Catholic and because of the lifestyle he led. There were rumours that she and Dean secretly still saw each other even after her marriage to Vic Damone, up until Dean's death in 1955; Joe Hyams, in his 1992 biography of Dean, James Dean: Little Boy Lost, claims that he visited Dean just as Angeli, then married, was leaving his home. An Order for the Solemnization of Marriage pamphlet with the name "Pier" lightly pencilled in every place the bride's name is left blank was found amongst Dean's personal effects after his death.

Angeli would later say that Dean was the love of her life: "He is the only man I ever loved deeply as a woman should love a man." Friends of hers have said she never fully recovered from his death and that she had nightmares about him up until her own death.

=== Marriage to Vic Damone ===
Angeli left Dean and married singer and actor Vic Damone in 1954. Singer and actor Dean Martin performed at their wedding. It was reported by several people who attended the wedding that they saw James Dean, claiming Dean watched the wedding from across the road on his motorcycle, even gunning the engine during the ceremony, although Dean later denied doing anything so "dumb."

During their marriage, they appeared as guests on the 17 June 1956 episode of What's My Line?. The couple had one son; their 1958 divorce was followed by highly publicised court battles for the custody of their only child.

=== Later life and death ===
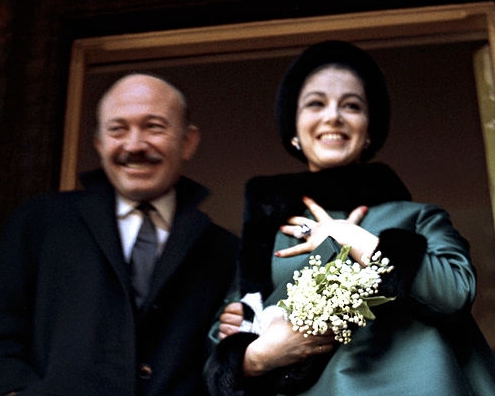
Armando Trovajoli and Pier Angeli on their wedding day, London, 14 February 1962

In 1962, Angeli married Italian composer Armando Trovajoli, with whom she had another son. She and Trovajoli separated in 1969.

In the early 1970s, she returned to California after having lived in Britain and Europe throughout the 1960s, and briefly lived with her close friend Debbie Reynolds until she found a little apartment in Beverly Hills.

On 10 September 1971, at the age of 39, Angeli was found dead of a barbiturate overdose at her home in Beverly Hills. On the day of her death, Angeli had been given an injection of compazine by her doctor to calm her down (she was unable to sleep and had run out of doriden, which the doctor refused to give her). It has been suggested that her death was due to anaphylaxis, but that was not supported by the findings of her autopsy.

Her former lover, Kirk Douglas, and his wife Anne Buydens, were among those who were invited to her funeral. She is interred in the Cimetière des Bulvis in Rueil-Malmaison, Hauts-de-Seine, France.

== Portrayals in popular culture ==
Angeli was portrayed by Valentina Cervi in the 2001 TV movie James Dean, which depicted her relationship with Dean. In 2015, she was portrayed by Alessandra Mastronardi in the James Dean biopic Life. A fictional interpretation of her life can be found in the book, Anna-Maria Pier Angeli: Une Madone à Babylone.

== Filmography ==
Film
Year	Title	Role	Notes
1950	Tomorrow Is Too Late	Mirella	Credited as Anna Maria Pierangeli
1951	Tomorrow Is Another Day	Luisa	Credited as Anna Maria Pierangeli
1951	Teresa	Teresa Russo	
1952	The Light Touch	Anna Vasarri	
1952	The Million Dollar Nickel	Herself	Short film
1952	The Devil Makes Three	Wilhelmina (Willie) Lehrt	
1953	The Story of Three Loves	Nina Burkhardt	Segment: "Equilibrium"
1953	Sombrero	Eufemia Calderon	
1954	Oh No, Mam'zelle	Denise de Flavigny / Nitouche	
1954	Flame and the Flesh	Lisa	
1954	The Silver Chalice	Deborra	
1956	Meet Me in Las Vegas	Herself	Uncredited cameo
1956	Somebody Up There Likes Me	Norma	
1956	Port Afrique	Ynez	
1957	The Vintage	Lucienne	
1958	Merry Andrew	Selena Gallini	
1959	SOS Pacific	Teresa	
1960	The Angry Silence	Anna Curtis	
1960	Estoril y sus fiestas	Herself	Short film
1961	White Slave Ship	Polly	Credited as Anna Maria Pierangeli
1962	Sodom and Gomorrah	Ildith	Credited as Anna Maria Pierangeli
1962	Musketeers of the Sea	Consuelo / Gracia	
1964	Shadow of Evil	Lila Sinn	
1965	Berlin, Appointment for the Spies	Paula Krauss	
1965	Battle of the Bulge	Louise	
1966	M.M.M. 83	Hélène Blanchard	
1966	Per mille dollari al giorno	Betty Benson	Credited as Annamaria Pierangeli
1966	King of Africa	Ann Peterson	
1968	Code Name: Red Roses	Marie	Credited as Anna Maria Pierangeli
1968	Every Bastard a King	Eileen	
1969	Cry Chicago	Bambi	Credited as Anna Maria Pierangeli
1969	Love Me, Love My Wife	Alexandra	Credited as Anna Maria Pierangeli
1970	In the Folds of the Flesh	Falesse / Ester	Credited as Anna Maria Pierangeli
1970	Quell'amore particolare	Cecilia	Credited as Anna Maria Pierangeli
1971	Octaman	Susan Lowry	Posthumous release

Television
Year	Title	Role	Notes
1956	What's My Line?	Herself	1 episode
1958	Westinghouse Desilu Playhouse	Bernadette Soubirous	1 episode

== Discography ==
- Italia con Pier Angeli (1959), Roulette, Vinyl.

== Awards and nominations ==
Award	Year	Category	Work	Result
BAFTA Awards	1961	Best Foreign Actress	The Angry Silence	Nominated
Golden Globe Award	1952	New Star Of The Year Actress	Teresa	Won
Golden Globe Award	1955	World Film Favorite – Female	—N/a	Nominated
Nastro d'Argento	1951	Best Actress (Migliore Attrice)	Domani è troppo tardi	Won
